= List of Formula One driver records =

The World Championship of Drivers has been held since 1950. Driver records listed here include all rounds which formed part of the World Championship since 1950: this includes the Indianapolis 500 from 1950–1960 (although it was not run to Formula One rules), and the 1952 and 1953 World Championship Grands Prix (which were run to Formula Two rules). Formula One races that were not qualification rounds for the World Championship are not included, and sprints are only included when specified.

== Races entered and started ==
Drivers are considered to be entered into a race if they attempt to compete in at least one official practice session with the intent of participating in the race. These drivers are noted on the entry list for that race. A driver is considered to have started a race if they line up on the grid or at the pit lane exit for the start of the race. If a race is stopped and restarted, participation in any portion of the race is counted only if that portion was in any way counted towards the final classification (e.g. races stopped before the end of the leader's second lap were declared null and void prior to 2005).

=== Total entries ===
	Driver	Seasons	Entries
1	(Spain) **Fernando Alonso**	2001, 2003–2018, 2021–2026	449
2	(United Kingdom) **Lewis Hamilton**	2007–2026	401
3	(Finland) Kimi Räikkönen	2001–2009, 2012–2021	353
4	(Brazil) Rubens Barrichello	1993–2011	326
5	(United Kingdom) Jenson Button	2000–2017	309
6	(Germany) Michael Schumacher	1991–2006, 2010–2012	308
7	(Mexico) **Sergio Pérez**	2011–2024, 2026	306
8	(Germany) Sebastian Vettel	2007–2022	300
9	(Germany) **Nico Hülkenberg**	2010, 2012–2020, 2022–2026	275
10	(Brazil) Felipe Massa	2002, 2004–2017	272

=== Total starts ===
	Driver	Seasons	Starts
1	(Spain) **Fernando Alonso**	2001, 2003–2018, 2021–2026	446
2	(United Kingdom) **Lewis Hamilton**	2007–2026	401
3	(Finland) Kimi Räikkönen	2001–2009, 2012–2021	349
4	(Brazil) Rubens Barrichello	1993–2011	322
5	(Germany) Michael Schumacher	1991–2006, 2010–2012	306
5	(United Kingdom) Jenson Button	2000–2017	306
7	(Mexico) **Sergio Pérez**	2011–2024, 2026	302
8	(Germany) Sebastian Vettel	2007–2022	299
9	(Germany) **Nico Hülkenberg**	2010, 2012–2020, 2022–2026	270
10	(Brazil) Felipe Massa	2002, 2004–2017	269

=== Youngest drivers to start a race ===
	Driver	Age	Place	Race
1	(Netherlands) **Max Verstappen**	17 years, 166 days	Ret	2015 Australian Grand Prix
2	(Canada) **Lance Stroll**	18 years, 148 days	Ret	2017 Australian Grand Prix
3	(Italy) **Kimi Antonelli**	18 years, 203 days	4th	2025 Australian Grand Prix
4	(United Kingdom) **Arvid Lindblad**	18 years, 212 days	8th	2026 Australian Grand Prix
5	(United Kingdom) **Oliver Bearman**	18 years, 305 days	7th	2024 Saudi Arabian Grand Prix
6	(United Kingdom) **Lando Norris**	19 years, 124 days	12th	2019 Australian Grand Prix
7	(Spain) Jaime Alguersuari	19 years, 125 days	15th	2009 Hungarian Grand Prix
8	(New Zealand) Mike Thackwell	19 years, 182 days	Ret	1980 Canadian Grand Prix
9	(Mexico) Ricardo Rodríguez	19 years, 208 days	Ret	1961 Italian Grand Prix
10	(Spain) **Fernando Alonso**	19 years, 218 days	12th	2001 Australian Grand Prix

=== Oldest drivers to enter a race ===
	Driver	Age	Place	Race
1	(Monaco) Louis Chiron	58 years, 277 days	DNQ	1958 Monaco Grand Prix
2	(Italy) Luigi Platé	56 years, 0 days	DNQ	1950 Italian Grand Prix
3	(France) Philippe Étancelin	55 years, 191 days	8th	1952 French Grand Prix
4	(Belgium) Arthur Legat	54 years, 232 days	Ret	1953 Belgian Grand Prix
5	(West Germany) Kurt Kuhnke	53 years, 96 days	DNQ	1963 German Grand Prix
6	(Italy) Luigi Fagioli	53 years, 22 days	1st	1951 French Grand Prix
7	(Italy) Piero Dusio	52 years, 330 days	DNQ	1952 Italian Grand Prix
8	(West Germany) Adolf Brudes	52 years, 293 days	Ret	1952 German Grand Prix
9	(West Germany) Hans Stuck	52 years, 260 days	14th	1953 Italian Grand Prix
10	(United States) Jack Ensley	52 years, 225 days	DNQ	1959 Indianapolis 500 (Note: The Indianapolis 500 was a round of the World Drivers' Championship 11 times (from 1950 to 1960). Drivers competing in the Indianapolis 500 during these years were credited with participation in a World Championship race and the top five finishers were credited with World Championship points.)

=== Oldest drivers to start a race ===
	Driver	Age	Place	Race
1	(Monaco) Louis Chiron	55 years, 292 days	6th	1955 Monaco Grand Prix
2	(France) Philippe Étancelin	55 years, 191 days	8th	1952 French Grand Prix
3	(Belgium) Arthur Legat	54 years, 232 days	Ret	1953 Belgian Grand Prix
4	(Italy) Luigi Fagioli	53 years, 22 days	1st	1951 French Grand Prix
5	(West Germany) Adolf Brudes	52 years, 293 days	Ret	1952 German Grand Prix
6	(West Germany) Hans Stuck	52 years, 260 days	14th	1953 Italian Grand Prix
7	(United Kingdom) Bill Aston	52 years, 127 days	Ret	1952 German Grand Prix
8	(Italy) Clemente Biondetti	52 years, 16 days	Ret	1950 Italian Grand Prix
9	(France) Louis Rosier	50 years, 274 days	5th	1956 German Grand Prix
10	(Switzerland) Rudolf Schoeller	50 years, 98 days	Ret	1952 German Grand Prix

=== Most consecutive race entries ===
	Driver	Consecutive entries	Races	
	Driver	Consecutive entries	First	Last
1	(Brazil) Rubens Barrichello	326	1993 South African Grand Prix	2011 Brazilian Grand Prix
2	(Germany) Sebastian Vettel	280	2007 Hungarian Grand Prix	2021 Abu Dhabi Grand Prix
3	(United Kingdom) **Lewis Hamilton**	265	2007 Australian Grand Prix	2020 Bahrain Grand Prix
4	(Netherlands) **Max Verstappen**	254	2015 Australian Grand Prix	2026 Las Vegas Grand Prix (ongoing)
4	(Spain) **Carlos Sainz Jr.**	254	2015 Australian Grand Prix	2026 Las Vegas Grand Prix (ongoing)
6	(Finland) **Valtteri Bottas**	247	2013 Australian Grand Prix	2024 Abu Dhabi Grand Prix
7	(United Kingdom) David Coulthard	239	1995 Brazilian Grand Prix	2008 Brazilian Grand Prix
8	(Australia) Daniel Ricciardo	232	2011 British Grand Prix	2022 Abu Dhabi Grand Prix
9	(Italy) Giancarlo Fisichella	223	1997 Australian Grand Prix	2009 Abu Dhabi Grand Prix
10	(Spain) **Fernando Alonso**	219	2003 Australian Grand Prix	2014 Abu Dhabi Grand Prix
10	(United Kingdom) Jenson Button	219	2005 European Grand Prix	2016 Abu Dhabi Grand Prix

=== Most consecutive race starts ===
	Driver	Consecutive starts	Races	
	Driver	Consecutive starts	First	Last
1	(United Kingdom) **Lewis Hamilton**	265	2007 Australian Grand Prix	2020 Bahrain Grand Prix
2	(Netherlands) **Max Verstappen**	254	2015 Australian Grand Prix	2026 Las Vegas Grand Prix (ongoing)
3	(Australia) Daniel Ricciardo	232	2011 British Grand Prix	2022 Abu Dhabi Grand Prix
4	(Finland) **Valtteri Bottas**	208	2015 Malaysian Grand Prix	2024 Abu Dhabi Grand Prix
5	(Germany) Nico Rosberg	206	2006 Bahrain Grand Prix	2016 Abu Dhabi Grand Prix
6	(Italy) Riccardo Patrese	187	1982 Belgian Grand Prix	1993 Australian Grand Prix
7	(United Kingdom) Jenson Button	179	2005 French Grand Prix	2015 Chinese Grand Prix
8	(Spain) **Fernando Alonso**	176	2005 French Grand Prix	2014 Abu Dhabi Grand Prix
9	(United Kingdom) David Coulthard	175	1995 Brazilian Grand Prix	2005 Canadian Grand Prix
10	(United Kingdom) **George Russell**	173	2019 Australian Grand Prix	2026 Las Vegas Grand Prix (ongoing)

=== Most races with a single constructor ===
	Driver	Constructor	Seasons	Entries	Starts
1	(United Kingdom) **Lewis Hamilton**	Mercedes	2013–2024	246	246
2	(Netherlands) **Max Verstappen**	Red Bull	2016–2026 (ongoing)	231	231
3	(Germany) Michael Schumacher	Ferrari	1996–2006	181	179
4	(United Kingdom) **Lando Norris**	McLaren	2019–2026 (ongoing)	173	172
4	(Monaco) **Charles Leclerc**	Ferrari	2019–2026 (ongoing)	173	171
6	(Finland) Kimi Räikkönen	Ferrari	2007–2009, 2014–2018	152	151
7	(United Kingdom) David Coulthard	McLaren	1996–2004	150	150
8	(Denmark) Kevin Magnussen	Haas	2017–2020, 2022–2024	146	145
9	(Brazil) Felipe Massa	Ferrari	2006–2013	140	139
10	(United Kingdom) Jenson Button	McLaren	2010–2017	137	136

=== Most races with a single engine manufacturer ===
	Driver	Engine	Seasons	Entries	Starts
1	(United Kingdom) **Lewis Hamilton**	Mercedes	2007–2024	356	356
2	(Finland) Kimi Räikkönen‡	Ferrari	2007–2009, 2014–2021	211	209
3	(Monaco) **Charles Leclerc**	Ferrari	2018–2026 (ongoing)	194	192
4	(Canada) **Lance Stroll**	Mercedes (Note: Including BWT Mercedes.)	2017–2025	193	189
5	(Germany) Michael Schumacher	Ferrari	1996–2006	181	179
6	(United Kingdom) **George Russell**	Mercedes	2019–2026 (ongoing)	173	173
7	(Spain) **Fernando Alonso**	Renault	2003–2006, 2008–2009, 2018, 2021–2022	171	170
8	(Finland) **Valtteri Bottas**	Mercedes	2014–2021	160	159
9	(Mexico) **Sergio Pérez**	Mercedes	2013–2020	156	154
10	(United Kingdom) David Coulthard	Mercedes	1996–2004	150	150

Notes

- ‡ Not counting Petronas engines that were rebadged Ferrari power units of earlier seasons.

== Wins ==
=== Total wins ===
	Driver	Seasons	Entries	Wins	Percentage
1	(United Kingdom) **Lewis Hamilton**	2007–2026	401	106	26.43%
2	(Germany) Michael Schumacher	1991–2006, 2010–2012	308	91	29.55%
3	(Netherlands) **Max Verstappen**	2015–2026	254	75	29.53%
4	(Germany) Sebastian Vettel	2007–2022	300	53	17.67%
5	(France) Alain Prost	1980–1991, 1993	202	51	25.25%
6	(Brazil) Ayrton Senna	1984–1994	162	41	25.31%
7	(Spain) **Fernando Alonso**	2001, 2003–2018, 2021–2026	449	32	7.13%
8	(United Kingdom) Nigel Mansell	1980–1992, 1994–1995	191	31	16.23%
9	(United Kingdom) Jackie Stewart	1965–1973	100	27	27.00%
10	(United Kingdom) Jim Clark	1960–1968	73	25	34.25%
10	(Austria) Niki Lauda	1971–1979, 1982–1985	177	25	14.12%

=== Percentage wins (at least 15 starts) ===
	Driver	Seasons	Starts	Wins	Percentage
1	(Argentina) Juan Manuel Fangio	1950–1951, 1953–1958	51 (Note: Fangio entered 52 separate races and started 51 of them, but in 7 Grands Prix (1950 Italian, 1951 French, 1953 Belgian, 1953 Swiss, 1956 Argentine, 1956 Monaco and 1956 Italian) shared 5 cars (all mentioned but 1950 Italian and 1953 Belgian) with other drivers which would reduce his percentages to 41.38%.)	24	47.06%
2	(Italy) Alberto Ascari	1950–1955	32 (Note: Ascari entered 33 separate races and started 32 of them, but in 3 Grands Prix (1950 Italian, 1951 French and 1953 German) shared 3 drives with 1 additional car (in latter with Luigi Villoresi) which would reduce his percentages to 37.14%.)	13	40.63%
3	(United Kingdom) Jim Clark	1960–1968	72	25	34.72%
4	(Germany) Michael Schumacher	1991–2006, 2010–2012	306	91	29.74%
5	(Netherlands) **Max Verstappen**	2015–2026	254	75	29.53%
6	(United Kingdom) Jackie Stewart	1965–1973	99	27	27.27%
7	(United Kingdom) **Lewis Hamilton**	2007–2026	401	106	26.43%
8	(France) Alain Prost	1980–1991, 1993	199	51	25.63%
9	(Brazil) Ayrton Senna	1984–1994	161	41	25.47%
10	(United Kingdom) Stirling Moss	1951–1961	66	16	24.24%

=== Most wins in a season ===
	Driver	Season	Wins	Races	Percentage
1	(Netherlands) **Max Verstappen**	2023	19	22	86.36%
2	(Netherlands) **Max Verstappen**	2022	15	22	68.18%
3	(Germany) Michael Schumacher	2004	13	18	72.22%
3	(Germany) Sebastian Vettel	2013	13	19	68.42%
5	(Germany) Michael Schumacher	2002	11	17	64.71%
5	(Germany) Sebastian Vettel	2011	11	19	57.89%
5	(United Kingdom) **Lewis Hamilton**	2014	11	19	57.89%
5	(United Kingdom) **Lewis Hamilton**	2018	11	21	52.38%
5	(United Kingdom) **Lewis Hamilton**	2019	11	21	52.38%
5	(United Kingdom) **Lewis Hamilton**	2020	11	17	64.71%

=== Highest percentage of wins in a season ===
	Driver	Season	Percentage	Races	Wins
1	(Netherlands) **Max Verstappen**	2023	86.36%	22	19
2	(Italy) Alberto Ascari	1952	75.00%	8	6
3	(Germany) Michael Schumacher	2004	72.22%	18	13
4	(United Kingdom) Jim Clark	1963	70.00%	10	7
5	(Germany) Sebastian Vettel	2013	68.42%	19	13
6	(Netherlands) **Max Verstappen**	2022	68.18%	22	15
7	(Argentina) Juan Manuel Fangio	1954	66.67%	9	6
8	(Germany) Michael Schumacher	2002	64.71%	17	11
8	(United Kingdom) **Lewis Hamilton**	2020	64.71%	17	11
10	(United Kingdom) Jim Clark	1965	60.00%	10	6

=== Most consecutive wins ===
	Driver	Season(s)	Wins	Consecutive races won
1	(Netherlands) **Max Verstappen**	2023	10	2023 Miami Grand Prix – 2023 Italian Grand Prix
2	(Germany) Sebastian Vettel	2013	9	2013 Belgian Grand Prix – 2013 Brazilian Grand Prix
2	(Netherlands) **Max Verstappen**	2023–2024	9	2023 Japanese Grand Prix – 2024 Saudi Arabian Grand Prix
4	(Italy) Alberto Ascari	1952–1953	7	1952 Belgian Grand Prix – 1953 Argentine Grand Prix (Note: Some sources extend Ascari's sequence to 9 wins, including the subsequent 1953 Dutch and Belgian Grands Prix and discounting the intervening 1953 Indianapolis 500, on the basis that very few of the European drivers competed in the Indianapolis 500 when it was part of the Drivers' Championship.)
4	(Germany) Michael Schumacher	2004	7	2004 European Grand Prix – 2004 Hungarian Grand Prix
4	(Germany) Nico Rosberg	2015–2016	7	2015 Mexican Grand Prix – 2016 Russian Grand Prix
7	(Germany) Michael Schumacher	2000–2001	6	2000 Italian Grand Prix – 2001 Malaysian Grand Prix
8	(Australia) Jack Brabham	1960	5	1960 Dutch Grand Prix – 1960 Portuguese Grand Prix
8	(United Kingdom) Jim Clark	1965	5	1965 Belgian Grand Prix – 1965 German Grand Prix
8	(United Kingdom) Nigel Mansell	1992	5	1992 South African Grand Prix – 1992 San Marino Grand Prix
8	(Germany) Michael Schumacher	2004	5	2004 Australian Grand Prix – 2004 Spanish Grand Prix
8	(United Kingdom) **Lewis Hamilton**	2014	5	2014 Italian Grand Prix – 2014 United States Grand Prix
8	(United Kingdom) **Lewis Hamilton**	2020	5	2020 Eifel Grand Prix – 2020 Bahrain Grand Prix
8	(Netherlands) **Max Verstappen**	2022	5	2022 French Grand Prix – 2022 Italian Grand Prix
8	(Italy) **Kimi Antonelli**	2026	5	2026 Chinese Grand Prix – 2026 Monaco Grand Prix

=== Most consecutive wins from first race of season ===
	Driver	Season	Wins	Races
1	(United Kingdom) Nigel Mansell	1992	5	1992 South African Grand Prix – 1992 San Marino Grand Prix
1	(Germany) Michael Schumacher	2004	5	2004 Australian Grand Prix – 2004 Spanish Grand Prix
3	(Brazil) Ayrton Senna	1991	4	1991 United States Grand Prix – 1991 Monaco Grand Prix
3	(Germany) Michael Schumacher	1994	4	1994 Brazilian Grand Prix – 1994 Monaco Grand Prix
3	(Germany) Nico Rosberg	2016	4	2016 Australian Grand Prix – 2016 Russian Grand Prix
6	(United Kingdom) Damon Hill	1996	3	1996 Australian Grand Prix – 1996 Argentine Grand Prix
6	(Germany) Michael Schumacher	2000	3	2000 Australian Grand Prix – 2000 San Marino Grand Prix
8	(Argentina) Juan Manuel Fangio	1957	2	1957 Argentine Grand Prix – 1957 Monaco Grand Prix
8	(United Kingdom) Jackie Stewart	1969	2	1969 South African Grand Prix – 1969 Spanish Grand Prix
8	(Brazil) Emerson Fittipaldi	1973	2	1973 Argentine Grand Prix – 1973 Brazilian Grand Prix
8	(Austria) Niki Lauda	1976	2	1976 Brazilian Grand Prix – 1976 South African Grand Prix
8	(France) Jacques Laffite	1979	2	1979 Argentine Grand Prix – 1979 Brazilian Grand Prix
8	(France) Alain Prost	1982	2	1982 South African Grand Prix – 1982 Brazilian Grand Prix
8	(Finland) Mika Häkkinen	1998	2	1998 Australian Grand Prix – 1998 Brazilian Grand Prix
8	(Germany) Michael Schumacher	2001	2	2001 Australian Grand Prix – 2001 Malaysian Grand Prix
8	(United Kingdom) Jenson Button	2009	2	2009 Australian Grand Prix – 2009 Malaysian Grand Prix
8	(Germany) Sebastian Vettel	2011	2	2011 Australian Grand Prix – 2011 Malaysian Grand Prix
8	(Germany) Sebastian Vettel	2018	2	2018 Australian Grand Prix – 2018 Bahrain Grand Prix
8	(Netherlands) **Max Verstappen**	2024	2	2024 Bahrain Grand Prix – 2024 Saudi Arabian Grand Prix

=== Most wins at the same Grand Prix ===
	Driver	Wins	Grand Prix	Seasons
1	(United Kingdom) **Lewis Hamilton**	9	British Grand Prix	2008, 2014, 2015, 2016, 2017, 2019, 2020, 2021, 2024
2	(Germany) Michael Schumacher	8	French Grand Prix	1994, 1995, 1997, 1998, 2001, 2002, 2004, 2006
2	(United Kingdom) **Lewis Hamilton**	8	Hungarian Grand Prix	2007, 2009, 2012, 2013, 2016, 2018, 2019, 2020
4	(Germany) Michael Schumacher	7	Canadian Grand Prix	1994, 1997, 1998, 2000, 2002, 2003, 2004
4	(Germany) Michael Schumacher	7	San Marino Grand Prix	1994, 1999, 2000, 2002, 2003, 2004, 2006
4	(United Kingdom) **Lewis Hamilton**	7	Canadian Grand Prix	2007, 2010, 2012, 2015, 2016, 2017, 2019
7	(France) Alain Prost	6	Brazilian Grand Prix	1982, 1984, 1985, 1987, 1988, 1990
7	(France) Alain Prost	6	French Grand Prix	1981, 1983, 1988, 1989, 1990, 1993
7	(Brazil) Ayrton Senna	6	Monaco Grand Prix	1987, 1989, 1990, 1991, 1992, 1993
7	(Germany) Michael Schumacher	6	Belgian Grand Prix	1992, 1995, 1996, 1997, 2001, 2002
7	(Germany) Michael Schumacher	6	Spanish Grand Prix	1995, 1996, 2001, 2002, 2003, 2004
7	(Germany) Michael Schumacher	6	Japanese Grand Prix	1995, 1997, 2000, 2001, 2002, 2004
7	(Germany) Michael Schumacher	6	European Grand Prix	1994, 1995, 2000, 2001, 2004, 2006
7	(United Kingdom) **Lewis Hamilton**	6	United States Grand Prix	2007, 2012, 2014, 2015, 2016, 2017
7	(United Kingdom) **Lewis Hamilton**	6	Spanish Grand Prix	2014, 2017, 2018, 2019, 2020, 2021
7	(United Kingdom) **Lewis Hamilton**	6	Chinese Grand Prix	2008, 2011, 2014, 2015, 2017, 2019
7	(Netherlands) **Max Verstappen**	6	Mexican Grand Prix (Note: Held as the Mexico City Grand Prix from 2021 onwards.)	2017, 2018, 2021, 2022, 2023, 2026

=== Most consecutive wins at the same Grand Prix ===
	Driver	Wins	Grand Prix	Seasons
1	(Brazil) Ayrton Senna	5	Monaco Grand Prix	1989, 1990, 1991, 1992, 1993
1	(United Kingdom) **Lewis Hamilton**	5	Spanish Grand Prix	2017, 2018, 2019, 2020, 2021
3	(Argentina) Juan Manuel Fangio	4	Argentine Grand Prix	1954, 1955, 1956, 1957
3	(United Kingdom) Jim Clark	4	Belgian Grand Prix	1962, 1963, 1964, 1965
3	(United Kingdom) Jim Clark	4	British Grand Prix	1962, 1963, 1964, 1965
3	(Brazil) Ayrton Senna	4	Belgian Grand Prix	1988, 1989, 1990, 1991
3	(Germany) Michael Schumacher	4	Spanish Grand Prix	2001, 2002, 2003, 2004
3	(Germany) Michael Schumacher	4	United States Grand Prix	2003, 2004, 2005, 2006
3	(United Kingdom) **Lewis Hamilton**	4	British Grand Prix	2014, 2015, 2016, 2017
3	(United Kingdom) **Lewis Hamilton**	4	United States Grand Prix	2014, 2015, 2016, 2017
3	(Netherlands) **Max Verstappen**	4	Emilia Romagna Grand Prix	2021, 2022, 2024, 2025
3	(Netherlands) **Max Verstappen**	4	Abu Dhabi Grand Prix	2020, 2021, 2022, 2023
3	(Netherlands) **Max Verstappen**	4	Japanese Grand Prix	2022, 2023, 2024, 2025

=== Most consecutive seasons with a win ===
	Driver	Seasons	Total
1	(Germany) Michael Schumacher	1992–2006	15
1	(United Kingdom) **Lewis Hamilton**	2007–2021	15
3	(Netherlands) **Max Verstappen**	2016–2026 (ongoing)	11
4	(France) Alain Prost	1981–1990	10
5	(Brazil) Ayrton Senna	1985–1993	9
6	(Brazil) Nelson Piquet	1980–1987	8
7	(United Kingdom) Stirling Moss	1955–1961	7
7	(United Kingdom) Jim Clark	1962–1968	7
7	(United Kingdom) David Coulthard	1997–2003	7
10	(United Kingdom) Jackie Stewart	1968–1973	6
10	(Germany) Sebastian Vettel	2008–2013	6

=== Most wins with a single constructor ===
	Driver	Constructor	Seasons	Wins	Starts	Percentage
1	(United Kingdom) **Lewis Hamilton**	Mercedes	2013–2024	84	246	34.15%
2	(Netherlands) **Max Verstappen**	Red Bull	2016–2026 (ongoing)	75	231	32.47%
3	(Germany) Michael Schumacher	Ferrari	1996–2006	72	179	40.22%
4	(Germany) Sebastian Vettel	Red Bull	2009–2014	38	113	33.63%
5	(Brazil) Ayrton Senna	McLaren	1988–1993	35	96	36.46%
6	(France) Alain Prost	McLaren	1980, 1984–1989	30	107	28.04%
7	(United Kingdom) Nigel Mansell	Williams	1985–1988, 1991–1992, 1994	28	95	29.47%
8	(United Kingdom) Jim Clark	Lotus	1960–1968	25	72	34.72%
9	(Germany) Nico Rosberg	Mercedes	2010–2016	23	136	16.91%
10	(United Kingdom) Damon Hill	Williams	1993–1996	21	65	32.31%
10	(United Kingdom) **Lewis Hamilton**	McLaren	2007–2012	21	110	19.09%

=== Youngest winners ===
(Only the first win for each driver is listed)

	Driver	Age	Race
1	(Netherlands) **Max Verstappen**	18 years, 228 days	2016 Spanish Grand Prix
2	(Italy) **Kimi Antonelli**	19 years, 202 days	2026 Chinese Grand Prix
3	(Germany) Sebastian Vettel	21 years, 73 days	2008 Italian Grand Prix
4	(Monaco) **Charles Leclerc**	21 years, 320 days	2019 Belgian Grand Prix
5	(Spain) **Fernando Alonso**	22 years, 26 days	2003 Hungarian Grand Prix
6	(United States) Troy Ruttman	22 years, 80 days	1952 Indianapolis 500
7	(New Zealand) Bruce McLaren	22 years, 104 days	1959 United States Grand Prix
8	(United Kingdom) **Lewis Hamilton**	22 years, 154 days	2007 Canadian Grand Prix
9	(Australia) **Oscar Piastri**	23 years, 106 days	2024 Hungarian Grand Prix
10	(Finland) Kimi Räikkönen	23 years, 157 days	2003 Malaysian Grand Prix

=== Oldest winners ===
(Only the last win for each driver is listed)

	Driver	Age	Race
1	(Italy) Luigi Fagioli	53 years, 22 days	1951 French Grand Prix
2	(Italy) Giuseppe Farina	46 years, 276 days	1953 German Grand Prix
3	(Argentina) Juan Manuel Fangio	46 years, 41 days	1957 German Grand Prix
4	(Italy) Piero Taruffi	45 years, 219 days	1952 Swiss Grand Prix
5	(Australia) Jack Brabham	43 years, 339 days	1970 South African Grand Prix
6	(United States) Sam Hanks	42 years, 321 days	1957 Indianapolis 500
7	(United Kingdom) **Lewis Hamilton**	41 years, 158 days	2026 Barcelona-Catalunya Grand Prix
8	(United Kingdom) Nigel Mansell	41 years, 97 days	1994 Australian Grand Prix
9	(United States) Lee Wallard	40 years, 264 days	1951 Indianapolis 500
10	(France) Maurice Trintignant	40 years, 200 days	1958 Monaco Grand Prix

=== Fewest races before first win ===
	Entry	Start	Driver	Race
1	1st race	1st race	(Italy) Giuseppe Farina	1950 British Grand Prix
1	1st race	1st race	(United States) Johnnie Parsons	1950 Indianapolis 500
1	1st race	1st race	(Italy) Giancarlo Baghetti	1961 French Grand Prix
4	2nd race	2nd race	(Argentina) Juan Manuel Fangio	1950 Monaco Grand Prix
4	2nd race	2nd race	(United States) Lee Wallard	1951 Indianapolis 500
6	3rd race	3rd race	(United States) Troy Ruttman	1952 Indianapolis 500
7	4th race	3rd race	(United States) Bill Vukovich	1953 Indianapolis 500
7	4th race	3rd race	(United Kingdom) Tony Brooks (Note: Shared drive with Stirling Moss)	1957 British Grand Prix
7	4th race	4th race	(Canada) Jacques Villeneuve	1996 European Grand Prix
10	5th race	4th race	(United States) Pat Flaherty	1956 Indianapolis 500
10	5th race	4th race	(Brazil) Emerson Fittipaldi	1970 United States Grand Prix
10	5th race	5th race	(Argentina) José Froilán González	1951 British Grand Prix
10	5th race	5th race	(Switzerland) Clay Regazzoni	1970 Italian Grand Prix

=== Most races before first win ===
	Entry	Start	Driver	Race
1	194th race	190th race	(Mexico) **Sergio Pérez**	2020 Sakhir Grand Prix
2	151st race	150th race	(Spain) **Carlos Sainz Jr.**	2022 British Grand Prix
3	132nd race	130th race	(Australia) Mark Webber	2009 German Grand Prix
4	125th race	123rd race	(Brazil) Rubens Barrichello	2000 German Grand Prix
5	119th race	117th race	(Italy) Jarno Trulli	2004 Monaco Grand Prix
6	115th race	113th race	(United Kingdom) Jenson Button	2006 Hungarian Grand Prix
7	111th race	111th race	(Germany) Nico Rosberg	2012 Chinese Grand Prix
7	111th race	110th race	(Italy) Giancarlo Fisichella	2003 Brazilian Grand Prix
9	110th race	110th race	(United Kingdom) **Lando Norris**	2024 Miami Grand Prix
10	99th race	96th race	(Finland) Mika Häkkinen	1997 European Grand Prix

=== Most races without a win ===
	Driver	Entries	Starts	Best result
1	(Germany) **Nico Hülkenberg**	275	270	3rd
2	(Italy) Andrea de Cesaris	214	208	2nd
3	(Canada) **Lance Stroll**	214	210	3rd
4	(Denmark) Kevin Magnussen	187	185	2nd
5	(Germany) Nick Heidfeld	185	183	2nd
6	(France) Romain Grosjean	181	179	2nd
7	(United Kingdom) Martin Brundle	165	158	2nd
8	(United Kingdom) Derek Warwick	162	147	2nd
9	(Thailand) **Alex Albon**	151	147	3rd
10	(France) Jean-Pierre Jarier	143	134	3rd
10	(United States) Eddie Cheever	143	132	2nd

=== Most wins without a World Championship ===
	Driver	Seasons	Entries	Starts	Wins
1	(United Kingdom) Stirling Moss	1951–1961	67	66	16
2	(United Kingdom) David Coulthard	1994–2008	247	246	13
3	(Argentina) Carlos Reutemann	1972–1982	146	146	12
4	(Brazil) Rubens Barrichello	1993–2011	326	322	11
4	(Brazil) Felipe Massa	2002, 2004–2017	272	269	11
6	(Sweden) Ronnie Peterson	1970–1978	123	123	10
6	(Austria) Gerhard Berger	1984–1997	210	210	10
6	(Finland) **Valtteri Bottas**	2013–2024, 2026	268	266	10
9	(Australia) Mark Webber	2002–2013	217	215	9
9	(Australia) **Oscar Piastri**	2023–2026	91	89	9
9	(Monaco) **Charles Leclerc**	2018–2026	194	192	9

=== Most wins in first championship season ===
	Driver	Season	Wins	Races won
1	(Canada) Jacques Villeneuve	1996	4	1996 European Grand Prix, 1996 British Grand Prix, 1996 Hungarian Grand Prix, 1996 Portuguese Grand Prix
1	(United Kingdom) **Lewis Hamilton**	2007	4	2007 Canadian Grand Prix, 2007 United States Grand Prix, 2007 Hungarian Grand Prix, 2007 Japanese Grand Prix
3	(Argentina) Juan Manuel Fangio (Note: Fangio began racing in Grands Prix in 1948 — before the first World Championship.)	1950	3	1950 Monaco Grand Prix, 1950 Belgian Grand Prix, 1950 French Grand Prix
3	(Italy) Giuseppe Farina (Note: Farina began racing in Grands Prix in the 1930s — before the first World Championship.)	1950	3	1950 British Grand Prix, 1950 Swiss Grand Prix, 1950 Italian Grand Prix
5	(United States) Johnnie Parsons	1950	1	1950 Indianapolis 500
5	(Italy) Giancarlo Baghetti	1961	1	1961 French Grand Prix
5	(United Kingdom) Jackie Stewart	1965	1	1965 Italian Grand Prix
5	(Switzerland) Clay Regazzoni	1970	1	1970 Italian Grand Prix
5	(Brazil) Emerson Fittipaldi	1970	1	1970 United States Grand Prix
5	(Colombia) Juan Pablo Montoya	2001	1	2001 Italian Grand Prix

=== Wins from farthest back on the starting grid ===
	Driver	Start position	Race
1	(United Kingdom) John Watson	22nd	1983 United States Grand Prix West
2	(United States) Bill Vukovich	19th	1954 Indianapolis 500
2	(Italy) **Kimi Antonelli**	19th	2026 Italian Grand Prix
4	(Brazil) Rubens Barrichello	18th	2000 German Grand Prix
5	(United Kingdom) John Watson	17th	1982 Detroit Grand Prix
5	(Finland) Kimi Räikkönen	17th	2005 Japanese Grand Prix
5	(Netherlands) **Max Verstappen**	17th	2024 São Paulo Grand Prix
8	(United Kingdom) Jackie Stewart	16th	1973 South African Grand Prix
8	(Germany) Michael Schumacher	16th	1995 Belgian Grand Prix
10	(Spain) **Fernando Alonso**	15th	2008 Singapore Grand Prix (Note: A year after the victory, Renault were charged with race fixing, which led to the team's suspended disqualification; however, the original results were left in place.)

== Pole positions ==
=== Total pole positions ===
	Driver	Seasons	Entries	Poles	Percentage
1	(United Kingdom) **Lewis Hamilton**	2007–2026	401	105	26.18%
2	(Germany) Michael Schumacher	1991–2006, 2010–2012	308	68	22.08%
3	(Brazil) Ayrton Senna	1984–1994	162	65	40.12%
4	(Germany) Sebastian Vettel	2007–2022	300	57	19.00%
5	(Netherlands) **Max Verstappen**	2015–2026	254	51	20.08%
6	(United Kingdom) Jim Clark	1960–1968	73	33	45.21%
6	(France) Alain Prost	1980–1991, 1993	202	33	16.34%
8	(United Kingdom) Nigel Mansell	1980–1992, 1994–1995	191	32	16.75%
9	(Germany) Nico Rosberg	2006–2016	206	30	14.56%
10	(Argentina) Juan Manuel Fangio	1950–1951, 1953–1958	52	29	55.77%

=== Percentage pole positions (at least 15 entries) ===
	Driver	Seasons	Entries	Poles	Percentage
1	(Argentina) Juan Manuel Fangio	1950–1951, 1953–1958	52	29	55.77%
2	(United Kingdom) Jim Clark	1960–1968	73	33	45.21%
3	(Italy) Alberto Ascari	1950–1955	33	14	42.42%
4	(Brazil) Ayrton Senna	1984–1994	162	65	40.12%
5	(United Kingdom) **Lewis Hamilton**	2007–2026	401	105	26.18%
6	(United Kingdom) Stirling Moss	1951–1961	67	16	23.88%
7	(Germany) Michael Schumacher	1991–2006, 2010–2012	308	68	22.08%
8	(Netherlands) **Max Verstappen**	2015–2026	254	51	20.08%
9	(Germany) Sebastian Vettel	2007–2022	300	57	19.00%
10	(United Kingdom) Jackie Stewart	1965–1973	100	17	17.00%

=== Most pole positions in a season ===
	Driver	Season	Races	Poles	WDC
1	(Germany) Sebastian Vettel	2011	19	15	1st
2	(United Kingdom) Nigel Mansell	1992	16	14	1st
3	(Brazil) Ayrton Senna	1988	16	13	1st
3	(Brazil) Ayrton Senna	1989	16	13	2nd
3	(France) Alain Prost	1993	16	13	1st
6	(United Kingdom) **Lewis Hamilton**	2016	21	12	2nd
6	(Netherlands) **Max Verstappen**	2023	22	12	1st
8	(Finland) Mika Häkkinen	1999	16	11	1st
8	(Germany) Michael Schumacher	2001	17	11	1st
8	(Germany) Nico Rosberg	2014	19	11	2nd
8	(United Kingdom) **Lewis Hamilton**	2015	19	11	1st
8	(United Kingdom) **Lewis Hamilton**	2017	20	11	1st
8	(United Kingdom) **Lewis Hamilton**	2018	21	11	1st

=== Highest percentage of pole positions in a season ===
	Driver	Season	Races	Poles	Percentage
1	(United Kingdom) Nigel Mansell	1992	16	14	87.50%
2	(Brazil) Ayrton Senna	1988	16	13	81.25%
2	(Brazil) Ayrton Senna	1989	16	13	81.25%
2	(France) Alain Prost	1993	16	13	81.25%
5	(Germany) Sebastian Vettel	2011	19	15	78.95%
6	(Argentina) Juan Manuel Fangio	1956	8	6	75.00%
7	(United Kingdom) Jim Clark	1963	10	7	70.00%
8	(Finland) Mika Häkkinen	1999	16	11	68.75%
9	(Italy) Alberto Ascari	1953	9	6	66.67%
9	(United Kingdom) Jim Clark	1962	9	6	66.67%

=== Most consecutive pole positions ===
	Driver	Poles	Races
1	(Brazil) Ayrton Senna	8	1988 Spanish – 1989 United States
1	(Netherlands) **Max Verstappen**	8	2023 Abu Dhabi – 2024 Emilia Romagna
3	(Brazil) Ayrton Senna	7	1990 Spanish – 1991 Monaco
3	(France) Alain Prost	7	1993 South African – 1993 Canadian
3	(Germany) Michael Schumacher	7	2000 Italian – 2001 Brazilian
3	(United Kingdom) **Lewis Hamilton**	7	2015 Monaco – 2015 Italian
7	(Austria) Niki Lauda	6	1974 Dutch – 1974 Italian
7	(Brazil) Ayrton Senna	6	1988 Brazilian – 1988 Detroit
7	(Brazil) Ayrton Senna	6	1989 Belgian – 1989 Australian
7	(United Kingdom) Nigel Mansell	6	1992 South African – 1992 Monaco
7	(Finland) Mika Häkkinen	6	1999 British – 1999 Italian
7	(Germany) Nico Rosberg	6	2015 Japanese – 2015 Abu Dhabi
7	(United Kingdom) **Lewis Hamilton**	6	2016 United States – 2017 Chinese

=== Most consecutive pole positions from first race of season ===
	Driver	Season	Poles	Races
1	(France) Alain Prost	1993	7	South African – Canadian
1	(Netherlands) **Max Verstappen**	2024	7	Bahrain – Emilia Romagna
3	(Brazil) Ayrton Senna	1988	6	Brazilian – Detroit
3	(United Kingdom) Nigel Mansell	1992	6	South African – Monaco
5	(Brazil) Ayrton Senna	1989	5	Brazilian – United States
5	(Finland) Mika Häkkinen	1999	5	Australian – Spanish
7	(Brazil) Ayrton Senna	1991	4	United States – Monaco
7	(Canada) Jacques Villeneuve	1997	4	Australian – San Marino
7	(Germany) Sebastian Vettel	2011	4	Australian – Turkish
7	(United Kingdom) **Lewis Hamilton**	2015	4	Australian – Bahrain

=== Most pole positions at the same Grand Prix ===
	Driver	Poles	Grand Prix	Seasons
1	(United Kingdom) **Lewis Hamilton**	9	Hungarian Grand Prix	2007, 2008, 2012, 2013, 2015, 2018, 2020, 2021, 2023
2	(Brazil) Ayrton Senna	8	San Marino Grand Prix	1985, 1986, 1987, 1988, 1989, 1990, 1991, 1994
2	(Germany) Michael Schumacher	8	Japanese Grand Prix	1994, 1995, 1998, 1999, 2000, 2001, 2002, 2004
2	(United Kingdom) **Lewis Hamilton**	8	Australian Grand Prix	2008, 2012, 2014, 2015, 2016, 2017, 2018, 2019
5	(Germany) Michael Schumacher	7	Spanish Grand Prix	1994, 1995, 2000, 2001, 2002, 2003, 2004
5	(Germany) Michael Schumacher	7	Hungarian Grand Prix	1994, 1996, 1997, 2000, 2001, 2004, 2005
5	(United Kingdom) **Lewis Hamilton**	7	British Grand Prix	2007, 2013, 2015, 2016, 2017, 2018, 2020
5	(United Kingdom) **Lewis Hamilton**	7	Italian Grand Prix	2009, 2012, 2014, 2015, 2016, 2017, 2020
9	(Brazil) Ayrton Senna	6	Australian Grand Prix	1985, 1988, 1989, 1990, 1991, 1993
9	(Brazil) Ayrton Senna	6	Brazilian Grand Prix	1986, 1988, 1989, 1990, 1991, 1994
9	(Germany) Michael Schumacher	6	Canadian Grand Prix	1994, 1995, 1997, 1999, 2000, 2001
9	(United Kingdom) **Lewis Hamilton**	6	Chinese Grand Prix	2007, 2008, 2013, 2014, 2015, 2017
9	(United Kingdom) **Lewis Hamilton**	6	Canadian Grand Prix	2007, 2008, 2010, 2015, 2016, 2017
9	(United Kingdom) **Lewis Hamilton**	6	Belgian Grand Prix	2008, 2013, 2015, 2017, 2018, 2020
9	(United Kingdom) **Lewis Hamilton**	6	Spanish Grand Prix	2014, 2016, 2017, 2018, 2020, 2021

=== Most consecutive pole positions at the same Grand Prix ===
	Driver	Poles	Grand Prix	Seasons
1	(Brazil) Ayrton Senna	7	San Marino Grand Prix	1985, 1986, 1987, 1988, 1989, 1990, 1991
2	(United Kingdom) **Lewis Hamilton**	6	Australian Grand Prix	2014, 2015, 2016, 2017, 2018, 2019
3	(Germany) Michael Schumacher	5	Japanese Grand Prix	1998, 1999, 2000, 2001, 2002
3	(Germany) Michael Schumacher	5	Spanish Grand Prix	2000, 2001, 2002, 2003, 2004
5	(United Kingdom) Stirling Moss	4	British Grand Prix	1955, 1956, 1957, 1958
5	(United Kingdom) Jim Clark	4	British Grand Prix	1962, 1963, 1964, 1965
5	(United Kingdom) Jim Clark	4	French Grand Prix	1962, 1963, 1964, 1965
5	(Brazil) Ayrton Senna	4	Australian Grand Prix	1988, 1989, 1990, 1991
5	(Brazil) Ayrton Senna	4	Brazilian Grand Prix	1988, 1989, 1990, 1991
5	(Brazil) Ayrton Senna	4	Italian Grand Prix	1988, 1989, 1990, 1991
5	(Brazil) Ayrton Senna	4	Monaco Grand Prix	1988, 1989, 1990, 1991
5	(Brazil) Ayrton Senna	4	Belgian Grand Prix	1988, 1989, 1990, 1991
5	(Germany) Michael Schumacher	4	Malaysian Grand Prix	1999, 2000, 2001, 2002
5	(Germany) Sebastian Vettel	4	Japanese Grand Prix	2009, 2010, 2011, 2012
5	(United Kingdom) **Lewis Hamilton**	4	Italian Grand Prix	2014, 2015, 2016, 2017
5	(United Kingdom) **Lewis Hamilton**	4	Malaysian Grand Prix	2014, 2015, 2016, 2017
5	(United Kingdom) **Lewis Hamilton**	4	British Grand Prix	2015, 2016, 2017, 2018
5	(Netherlands) **Max Verstappen**	4	Abu Dhabi Grand Prix	2020, 2021, 2022, 2023
5	(Netherlands) **Max Verstappen**	4	Austrian Grand Prix	2021, 2022, 2023, 2024
5	(Netherlands) **Max Verstappen**	4	Japanese Grand Prix	2022, 2023, 2024, 2025
5	(Monaco) **Charles Leclerc**	4	Azerbaijan Grand Prix	2021, 2022, 2023, 2024

Notes

- Juan Manuel Fangio qualified on pole position four times at the Monaco Grand Prix between 1950–1957 when it was held as a championship race; the 1952 edition was non-championship sportscar race whilst the race was not held in 1951 and 1953–1954.

=== Most consecutive seasons with a pole position ===
	Driver	Years	Seasons
1	(United Kingdom) **Lewis Hamilton**	15	2007–2021
2	(Germany) Michael Schumacher	13	1994–2006
3	(Brazil) Ayrton Senna	10	1985–1994
4	(Brazil) Nelson Piquet	8	1980–1987
4	(Netherlands) **Max Verstappen**	8	2019–2026 (ongoing)
6	(United Kingdom) Stirling Moss	7	1955–1961
6	(United Kingdom) Jim Clark	7	1962–1968
8	(Argentina) Juan Manuel Fangio	6	1953–1958
8	(France) Alain Prost	6	1981–1986
8	(Finland) Kimi Räikkönen	6	2003–2008
8	(Germany) Sebastian Vettel	6	2008–2013

=== Most pole positions with a single constructor ===
	Driver	Constructor	Seasons	Poles	Starts	Percentage
1	(United Kingdom) **Lewis Hamilton**	Mercedes	2013–2024	78	246	31.71%
2	(Germany) Michael Schumacher	Ferrari	1996–2006	58	179	32.40%
3	(Netherlands) **Max Verstappen**	Red Bull	2016–2026 (ongoing)	51	231	22.08%
4	(Brazil) Ayrton Senna	McLaren	1988–1993	46	96	47.92%
5	(Germany) Sebastian Vettel	Red Bull	2009–2014	44	113	38.94%
6	(United Kingdom) Jim Clark	Lotus	1960–1968	33	72	45.83%
7	(Germany) Nico Rosberg	Mercedes	2010–2016	30	136	22.06%
8	(United Kingdom) Nigel Mansell	Williams	1985–1988, 1991–1992, 1994	28	95	29.47%
9	(Monaco) **Charles Leclerc**	Ferrari	2019–2026 (ongoing)	27	171	15.79%
10	(Finland) Mika Häkkinen	McLaren	1993–2001	26	131	19.85%
10	(United Kingdom) **Lewis Hamilton**	McLaren	2007–2012	26	110	23.64%

=== Youngest polesitters ===
(Only the first pole position for each driver is listed)

	Driver	Age	Race
1	(Italy) **Kimi Antonelli**	19 years, 202 days	2026 Chinese Grand Prix
2	(Germany) Sebastian Vettel	21 years, 73 days	2008 Italian Grand Prix
3	(Monaco) **Charles Leclerc**	21 years, 166 days	2019 Bahrain Grand Prix
4	(Spain) **Fernando Alonso**	21 years, 237 days	2003 Malaysian Grand Prix
5	(Netherlands) **Max Verstappen**	21 years, 308 days	2019 Hungarian Grand Prix
6	(United Kingdom) **Lando Norris**	21 years, 317 days	2021 Russian Grand Prix
7	(Canada) **Lance Stroll**	22 years, 17 days	2020 Turkish Grand Prix
8	(Brazil) Rubens Barrichello	22 years, 97 days	1994 Belgian Grand Prix
9	(United Kingdom) **Lewis Hamilton**	22 years, 154 days	2007 Canadian Grand Prix
10	(Italy) Andrea de Cesaris	22 years, 308 days	1982 United States Grand Prix West

=== Oldest polesitters ===
(Only the last pole position for each driver is listed)

	Driver	Age	Race
1	(Italy) Giuseppe Farina	47 years, 79 days	1954 Argentine Grand Prix
2	(Argentina) Juan Manuel Fangio	46 years, 209 days	1958 Argentine Grand Prix
3	(Australia) Jack Brabham	44 years, 17 days	1970 Spanish Grand Prix
4	(United States) Mario Andretti	42 years, 196 days	1982 Italian Grand Prix
5	(United Kingdom) **Lewis Hamilton**	41 years, 298 days	2026 Mexico City Grand Prix
6	(United Kingdom) Nigel Mansell	41 years, 97 days	1994 Australian Grand Prix
7	(Argentina) Carlos Reutemann	39 years, 188 days	1981 Caesars Palace Grand Prix
8	(United Kingdom) Graham Hill	39 years, 156 days	1968 British Grand Prix
9	(Finland) Kimi Räikkönen	38 years, 320 days	2018 Italian Grand Prix
10	(United States) Fred Agabashian	38 years, 283 days	1952 Indianapolis 500

=== Fewest races before first pole position ===
	Entry	Start	Driver	Race
1	1st race	1st race	(Italy) Giuseppe Farina	1950 British Grand Prix
1	1st race	1st race	(United States) Walt Faulkner	1950 Indianapolis 500
1	1st race	1st race	(United States) Duke Nalon	1951 Indianapolis 500
1	1st race	1st race	(United States) Mario Andretti	1968 United States Grand Prix
1	1st race	1st race	(Argentina) Carlos Reutemann	1972 Argentine Grand Prix
1	1st race	1st race	(Canada) Jacques Villeneuve	1996 Australian Grand Prix
7	2nd race	2nd race	(Argentina) Juan Manuel Fangio	1950 Monaco Grand Prix
8	3rd race	3rd race	(United States) Fred Agabashian	1952 Indianapolis 500
8	3rd race	3rd race	(United States) Bill Vukovich	1953 Indianapolis 500
8	3rd race	3rd race	(Italy) Eugenio Castellotti	1955 Belgian Grand Prix
8	3rd race	3rd race	(United States) Dick Rathmann	1958 Indianapolis 500
8	3rd race	3rd race	(United Kingdom) John Surtees	1960 Portuguese Grand Prix

=== Most races before first pole position ===
	Entry	Driver	Race
1	219th race	(Mexico) **Sergio Pérez**	2022 Saudi Arabian Grand Prix
2	191st race	(France) **Pierre Gasly**	2026 Italian Grand Prix
3	151st race	(Spain) **Carlos Sainz Jr.**	2022 British Grand Prix
4	141st race	(Denmark) Kevin Magnussen	2022 São Paulo Grand Prix
5	132nd race	(Australia) Mark Webber	2009 German Grand Prix
6	119th race	(Italy) Jarno Trulli	2004 Monaco Grand Prix
7	116th race	(Belgium) Thierry Boutsen	1990 Hungarian Grand Prix
8	111th race	(Germany) Nico Rosberg	2012 Chinese Grand Prix
9	94th race	(Australia) Daniel Ricciardo	2016 Monaco Grand Prix
9	94th race	(Finland) Mika Häkkinen	1997 Luxembourg Grand Prix

=== Most races without a pole position ===
	Driver	Entries	Starts	Best grid position
1	(France) **Esteban Ocon**	199	198	3rd
2	(France) Romain Grosjean	181	179	2nd
3	(United Kingdom) Martin Brundle	165	158	3rd
3	(United Kingdom) Johnny Herbert	165	160	4th
5	(United Kingdom) Derek Warwick	162	147	3rd
6	(France) Olivier Panis	158	157	3rd
7	(Thailand) **Alex Albon**	151	147	4th
8	(United Kingdom) Eddie Irvine	148	147	2nd
9	(United States) Eddie Cheever	143	132	2nd
10	(Germany) Adrian Sutil	128	128	2nd

=== Most pole positions without a World Championship ===
	Driver	Seasons	Entries	Starts	Poles
1	(Monaco) **Charles Leclerc**	2018–2026	194	192	27
2	(Finland) **Valtteri Bottas**	2013–2024, 2026	268	266	20
3	(France) René Arnoux	1978–1989	165	149	18
4	(Brazil) Felipe Massa	2002, 2004–2017	272	269	16
4	(United Kingdom) Stirling Moss	1951–1961	67	66	16
6	(Brazil) Rubens Barrichello	1993–2011	326	322	14
6	(Sweden) Ronnie Peterson	1970–1978	123	123	14
8	(Belgium) Jacky Ickx	1966–1979	122	116	13
8	(Colombia) Juan Pablo Montoya	2001–2006	95	94	13
8	(Australia) Mark Webber	2002–2013	217	215	13

=== Biggest gap between pole and second position (by percentage) ===
	Driver	Race	Pole time	Gap to second (s)	Percentage
1	(United Kingdom) Nigel Mansell	1992 British Grand Prix	1:18.965	+1.919	+2.430%
2	(France) Alain Prost	1983 French Grand Prix	1:36.672	+2.308	+2.387%
3	(Argentina) Juan Manuel Fangio	1950 Monaco Grand Prix	1:50.200	+2.600	+2.359%
4	(Argentina) Juan Manuel Fangio	1956 Argentine Grand Prix	1:42.500	+2.200	+2.146%
5	(Belgium) Jacky Ickx	1968 German Grand Prix	9:04.000	+10.900	+2.004%
6	(United Kingdom) Nigel Mansell	1992 Belgian Grand Prix	1:50.545	+2.198	+1.988%
7	(Italy) Alberto Ascari	1952 Dutch Grand Prix	1:46.500	+2.100	+1.972%
8	(Canada) Jacques Villeneuve	1997 Australian Grand Prix	1:29.369	+1.754	+1.963%
9	(Argentina) Juan Manuel Fangio	1956 Belgian Grand Prix	4:09.800	+4.900	+1.962%
10	(United Kingdom) Jim Clark	1967 German Grand Prix	8:04.100	+9.400	+1.942%

=== Percentage pole positions converted to wins (at least 5 poles) ===
	Driver	Seasons	Poles	Wins	Percentage
1	(Italy) **Kimi Antonelli**	2025–2026	7	6	85.71%
2	(Netherlands) **Max Verstappen**	2015–2026	51	40	78.43%
3	(Australia) **Oscar Piastri**	2023–2026	6	4	66.67%
3	(Brazil) Emerson Fittipaldi	1970–1980	6	4	66.67%
5	(Italy) Alberto Ascari	1950–1955	14	9	64.29%
6	(Spain) **Fernando Alonso**	2001, 2003–2018, 2021–2026	22	14	63.64%
7	(United Kingdom) Jenson Button	2000–2017	8	5	62.50%
8	(Germany) Michael Schumacher	1991–2006, 2010–2012	68	40	58.82%
9	(United Kingdom) **Lewis Hamilton**	2007–2026	105	61	58.10%
10	(United Kingdom) **Lando Norris**	2019–2026	20	11	55.00%

=== Most front rows ===
	Driver	Entries	Poles	Front rows	Percentage
1	(United Kingdom) **Lewis Hamilton**	401	105	179	44.64%
2	(Germany) Michael Schumacher	308	68	116	37.66%
3	(Germany) Sebastian Vettel	300	57	101	33.67%
4	(Netherlands) **Max Verstappen**	254	51	92	36.22%
5	(Brazil) Ayrton Senna	162	65	87	53.70%
6	(France) Alain Prost	202	33	86	42.57%
7	(Germany) Nico Rosberg	206	30	60	29.13%
8	(United Kingdom) Nigel Mansell	191	32	56	29.32%
9	(Argentina) Juan Manuel Fangio	52	29	48	92.31%
9	(United Kingdom) Jim Clark	73	33	48	65.75%
9	(Monaco) **Charles Leclerc**	194	27	48	24.74%

== Fastest laps ==
=== Total fastest laps ===
	Driver	Entries	Fastest laps	Percentage
1	(Germany) Michael Schumacher	308	77	25.00%
2	(United Kingdom) **Lewis Hamilton**	401	70	17.46%
3	(Finland) Kimi Räikkönen	353	46	13.03%
4	(France) Alain Prost	202	41	20.30%
5	(Germany) Sebastian Vettel	300	38	12.67%
5	(Netherlands) **Max Verstappen**	254	38	14.96%
7	(United Kingdom) Nigel Mansell	191	30	15.71%
8	(United Kingdom) Jim Clark	73	28	38.36%
9	(Spain) **Fernando Alonso**	449	26	5.79%
10	(Finland) Mika Häkkinen	165	25	15.15%

=== Percentage fastest laps (at least 15 starts) ===
	Driver	Seasons	Starts	Fastest laps	Percentage
1	(Argentina) Juan Manuel Fangio	1950–1951, 1953–1958	51	23	45.10%
2	(United Kingdom) Jim Clark	1960–1968	72	28	38.89%
3	(Italy) Alberto Ascari	1950–1955	32	12	37.50%
4	(United Kingdom) Stirling Moss	1951–1961	66	19	28.79%
5	(Germany) Michael Schumacher	1991–2006, 2010–2012	306	77	25.16%
6	(Italy) **Kimi Antonelli**	2025–2026	45	11	24.44%
7	(Argentina) José Froilán González	1950–1957, 1960	26	6	23.08%
8	(France) Alain Prost	1980–1991, 1993	199	41	20.60%
9	(United Kingdom) **Lewis Hamilton**	2007–2026	401	70	17.46%
10	(United Kingdom) Damon Hill	1992–1999	115	19	16.52%

=== Most fastest laps in a season ===
	Driver	Season	Races	Fastest laps	Percentage	WDC
1	(Germany) Michael Schumacher	2004	18	10	55.56%	1st
1	(Finland) Kimi Räikkönen	2008	18	10	55.56%	3rd
1	(Finland) Kimi Räikkönen	2005	19	10	52.63%	2nd
4	(Finland) Mika Häkkinen	2000	17	9	52.94%	2nd
4	(Netherlands) **Max Verstappen**	2023	22	9	40.91%	1st
6	(United Kingdom) Nigel Mansell	1992	16	8	50.00%	1st
6	(Germany) Michael Schumacher	1994	16	8	50.00%	1st
6	(Germany) Michael Schumacher	1995	17	8	47.06%	1st
6	(United Kingdom) **Lewis Hamilton**	2015	19	8	42.11%	1st
6	(Italy) **Kimi Antonelli**	2026	21*	8	38.10%*	1st

Notes

- * Season still in progress.

=== Highest percentage of fastest laps in a season ===
	Driver	Season	Races	Fastest laps	Percentage
1	(Italy) Alberto Ascari	1952	8	6	75.00%
2	(Argentina) Juan Manuel Fangio	1951	8	5	62.50%
3	(United Kingdom) Jim Clark	1963	10	6	60.00%
3	(United Kingdom) Jim Clark	1965	10	6	60.00%
5	(United Kingdom) Jim Clark	1962	9	5	55.56%
5	(Germany) Michael Schumacher	2004	18	10	55.56%
5	(Finland) Kimi Räikkönen	2008	18	10	55.56%
8	(Finland) Mika Häkkinen	2000	17	9	52.94%
9	(Finland) Kimi Räikkönen	2005	19	10	52.63%
10	(Argentina) Juan Manuel Fangio	1956	8	4	50.00%
10	(United Kingdom) Nigel Mansell	1992	16	8	50.00%
10	(Germany) Michael Schumacher	1994	16	8	50.00%

=== Most consecutive fastest laps ===
	Driver	Fastest laps	Races
1	(Italy) Alberto Ascari	7	1952 Belgian Grand Prix – 1953 Argentine Grand Prix
2	(Finland) Kimi Räikkönen	6	2008 Spanish Grand Prix – 2008 British Grand Prix
3	(Germany) Michael Schumacher	5	2004 Bahrain Grand Prix – 2004 European Grand Prix
4	(United Kingdom) Jackie Stewart	4	1969 Monaco Grand Prix – 1969 British Grand Prix
4	(Canada) Gilles Villeneuve	4	1979 South African Grand Prix – 1979 Belgian Grand Prix
4	(United Kingdom) Nigel Mansell	4	1991 Canadian Grand Prix – 1991 British Grand Prix
4	(Finland) Kimi Räikkönen	4	2005 French Grand Prix – 2005 Hungarian Grand Prix

Notes

- This table deliberately stops at four consecutive fastest laps because more than 20 entries (28 as of the cited source) have three consecutive fastest laps.

=== Most fastest laps at the same Grand Prix ===
	Driver	Fastest laps	Grand Prix	Seasons
1	(United Kingdom) Nigel Mansell	7	British Grand Prix	1986, 1987, 1988, 1989, 1990, 1991, 1992
1	(Germany) Michael Schumacher	7	Spanish Grand Prix	1993, 1994, 1996, 1999, 2001, 2002, 2004
1	(United Kingdom) **Lewis Hamilton**	7	Italian Grand Prix	2011, 2013, 2014, 2015, 2018, 2019, 2020
4	(France) Alain Prost	6	Belgian Grand Prix	1985, 1986, 1987, 1989, 1990, 1993
4	(Germany) Michael Schumacher	6	European Grand Prix	1994, 1995, 2000, 2002, 2004, 2006
4	(Finland) Kimi Räikkönen	6	Australian Grand Prix	2002, 2003, 2006, 2007, 2013, 2017
7	(United Kingdom) Stirling Moss	5	British Grand Prix	1954, 1955, 1956, 1957, 1959
7	(United Kingdom) Jim Clark	5	Dutch Grand Prix	1961, 1963, 1964, 1965, 1967
7	(United Kingdom) David Coulthard	5	French Grand Prix	1998, 1999, 2000, 2001, 2002
7	(Germany) Michael Schumacher	5	Australian Grand Prix	1992, 1994, 1999, 2001, 2004
7	(Germany) Michael Schumacher	5	San Marino Grand Prix	1998, 1999, 2003, 2004, 2005
7	(Germany) Michael Schumacher	5	Monaco Grand Prix	1994, 1997, 2004, 2005, 2006
7	(Germany) Michael Schumacher	5	French Grand Prix	1993, 1995, 1997, 2004, 2006
7	(Germany) Michael Schumacher	5	Brazilian Grand Prix	1993, 1994, 1995, 2000, 2006
7	(Germany) Michael Schumacher	5	German Grand Prix	1993, 1995, 2002, 2006, 2012
7	(Germany) Sebastian Vettel	5	United States Grand Prix	2012, 2013, 2014, 2016, 2017
7	(United Kingdom) **Lewis Hamilton**	5	Spanish Grand Prix	2010, 2011, 2015, 2017, 2019
7	(United Kingdom) **Lewis Hamilton**	5	British Grand Prix	2014, 2015, 2017, 2019, 2022

=== Most consecutive fastest laps at the same Grand Prix ===
	Driver	Fastest laps	Grand Prix	Seasons
1	(United Kingdom) Nigel Mansell	7	British Grand Prix	1986, 1987, 1988, 1989, 1990, 1991, 1992
2	(United Kingdom) David Coulthard	5	French Grand Prix	1998, 1999, 2000, 2001, 2002
3	(Argentina) Juan Manuel Fangio	4	Monaco Grand Prix	1950, 1955, 1956, 1957
3	(United Kingdom) Stirling Moss	4	British Grand Prix	1954, 1955, 1956, 1957
4	(Italy) Alberto Ascari	3	British Grand Prix	1952, 1953, 1954
4	(United Kingdom) Stirling Moss	3	Dutch Grand Prix	1954, 1959, 1960
4	(United States) Phil Hill	3	Italian Grand Prix	1958, 1959, 1960
4	(United Kingdom) Jim Clark	3	United States Grand Prix	1962, 1963, 1964
4	(United Kingdom) Jim Clark	3	Dutch Grand Prix	1963, 1964, 1965
4	(France) Alain Prost	3	Belgian Grand Prix	1985, 1986, 1987
4	(Austria) Gerhard Berger	3	Portuguese Grand Prix	1987, 1988, 1989
4	(United Kingdom) Nigel Mansell	3	French Grand Prix	1990, 1991, 1992
4	(Germany) Michael Schumacher	3	Brazilian Grand Prix	1993, 1994, 1995
4	(Germany) Michael Schumacher	3	Canadian Grand Prix	1993, 1994, 1995
4	(Germany) Michael Schumacher	3	San Marino Grand Prix	2003, 2004, 2005
4	(Germany) Michael Schumacher	3	Monaco Grand Prix	2004, 2005, 2006
4	(United Kingdom) Damon Hill	3	British Grand Prix	1993, 1994, 1995
4	(Finland) Mika Häkkinen	3	Monaco Grand Prix	1998, 1999, 2000
4	(Finland) Mika Häkkinen	3	British Grand Prix	1999, 2000, 2001
4	(Germany) Sebastian Vettel	3	United States Grand Prix	2012, 2013, 2014
4	(United Kingdom) **Lewis Hamilton**	3	Italian Grand Prix	2013, 2014, 2015
4	(United Kingdom) **Lewis Hamilton**	3	Italian Grand Prix	2018, 2019, 2020
4	(Netherlands) **Max Verstappen**	3	Austrian Grand Prix	2021, 2022, 2023

=== Most consecutive seasons with a fastest lap ===
	Driver	Years	Seasons
1	(United Kingdom) **Lewis Hamilton**	17	2010–2026 (ongoing)
2	(Germany) Michael Schumacher	15	1992–2006
3	(France) Alain Prost	11	1981–1991
3	(Germany) Sebastian Vettel	11	2009–2019
3	(Netherlands) **Max Verstappen**	11	2016–2026 (ongoing)
6	(United Kingdom) Stirling Moss	8	1954–1961
6	(United Kingdom) Nigel Mansell	8	1985–1992
8	(Austria) Gerhard Berger	7	1986–1992
8	(Brazil) Ayrton Senna	7	1987–1993
8	(Finland) Kimi Räikkönen	7	2002–2008
8	(Finland) Kimi Räikkönen	7	2012–2018
8	(United Kingdom) **Lando Norris**	7	2020–2026 (ongoing)

=== Most fastest laps with a single constructor ===
	Driver	Constructor	Seasons	Fastest laps	Starts	Percentage
1	(United Kingdom) **Lewis Hamilton**	Mercedes	2013–2024	55	246	22.36%
2	(Germany) Michael Schumacher	Ferrari	1996–2006	53	179	29.61%
3	(Netherlands) **Max Verstappen**	Red Bull	2016–2026 (ongoing)	38	231	16.45%
4	(United Kingdom) Jim Clark	Lotus	1960–1968	28	72	38.89%
5	(Finland) Mika Häkkinen	McLaren	1993–2001	25	132	18.94%
6	(France) Alain Prost	McLaren	1980, 1984–1989	24	107	22.43%
6	(Germany) Sebastian Vettel	Red Bull	2009–2014	24	113	21.24%
8	(United Kingdom) Nigel Mansell	Williams	1985–1988, 1991–1992, 1994	23	95	24.21%
8	(Germany) Michael Schumacher	Benetton	1991–1995	23	68	33.82%
8	(Finland) Kimi Räikkönen	Ferrari	2007–2009, 2014–2018	23	152	15.13%

=== Youngest drivers to set a fastest lap ===
(Only the first fastest lap for each driver is listed)

	Driver	Age	Race
1	(Italy) **Kimi Antonelli**	18 years, 224 days	2025 Japanese Grand Prix
2	(Netherlands) **Max Verstappen**	19 years, 44 days	2016 Brazilian Grand Prix
3	(United Kingdom) **Lando Norris**	20 years, 235 days	2020 Austrian Grand Prix
4	(Germany) Nico Rosberg	20 years, 258 days	2006 Bahrain Grand Prix
5	(Monaco) **Charles Leclerc**	21 years, 166 days	2019 Bahrain Grand Prix
6	(Mexico) Esteban Gutiérrez	21 years, 280 days	2013 Spanish Grand Prix
7	(Spain) **Fernando Alonso**	21 years, 321 days	2003 Canadian Grand Prix
8	(New Zealand) Bruce McLaren	21 years, 322 days	1959 British Grand Prix
9	(Germany) Sebastian Vettel	21 years, 353 days	2009 British Grand Prix
10	(Russia) Daniil Kvyat	22 years, 19 days	2016 Spanish Grand Prix

=== Oldest drivers to set a fastest lap ===
	Driver	Age	Race
1	(Argentina) Juan Manuel Fangio	46 years, 209 days	1958 Argentine Grand Prix
2	(Italy) Piero Taruffi	45 years, 219 days	1952 Swiss Grand Prix
3	(Italy) Giuseppe Farina	44 years, 321 days	1951 Italian Grand Prix
4	(Australia) Jack Brabham	44 years, 107 days	1970 British Grand Prix
5	(Italy) Luigi Villoresi	44 years, 22 days	1953 Dutch Grand Prix
6	(Germany) Karl Kling	43 years, 319 days	1954 German Grand Prix
7	(Germany) Michael Schumacher	43 years, 201 days	2012 German Grand Prix
8	(Spain) **Fernando Alonso**	42 years, 339 days	2024 Austrian Grand Prix
9	(United States) Paul Russo	42 years, 50 days	1956 Indianapolis 500
10	(France) Maurice Trintignant	42 years, 43 days	1959 United States Grand Prix

=== Fewest races before first fastest lap ===
	Entry	Start	Driver	Race
1	1st race	1st race	(Italy) Giuseppe Farina	1950 British Grand Prix
1	1st race	1st race	(United States) Johnnie Parsons	1950 Indianapolis 500
1	1st race	1st race	(Canada) Jacques Villeneuve	1996 Australian Grand Prix
1	1st race	1st race	(Germany) Nico Rosberg	2006 Bahrain Grand Prix
2	2nd race	2nd race	(Argentina) Juan Manuel Fangio	1950 Monaco Grand Prix
2	2nd race	2nd race	(United States) Lee Wallard	1951 Indianapolis 500
2	2nd race	2nd race	(United States) Bill Vukovich	1952 Indianapolis 500
2	2nd race	2nd race	(Germany) Hans Herrmann	1954 French Grand Prix
2	2nd race	2nd race	(United States) Phil Hill	1958 Italian Grand Prix
2	2nd race	2nd race	(United Kingdom) **Lewis Hamilton**	2007 Malaysian Grand Prix

=== Most races before first fastest lap ===
	Entry	Driver	Race
1	203rd race	(Italy) Jarno Trulli	2009 Bahrain Grand Prix
2	155th race	(United Kingdom) Jenson Button	2009 Malaysian Grand Prix
3	152nd race	(France) **Esteban Ocon**	2024 United States Grand Prix
4	134th race	(Germany) Nick Heidfeld	2008 Malaysian Grand Prix
5	131st race	(Australia) Mark Webber	2009 Hungarian Grand Prix
6	127th race	(Thailand) **Alexander Albon**	2025 São Paulo Grand Prix
7	114th race	(Belgium) Thierry Boutsen	1990 German Grand Prix
7	114th race	(Brazil) Rubens Barrichello	2000 Australian Grand Prix
9	104th race	(Spain) **Carlos Sainz Jr.**	2020 Styrian Grand Prix
10	92nd race	(Finland) Mika Häkkinen	1997 Italian Grand Prix

=== Most races without a fastest lap ===
	Driver	Entries	Starts
1	(Canada) **Lance Stroll**	214	210
2	(United Kingdom) Martin Brundle	165	158
2	(United Kingdom) Johnny Herbert	165	160
4	(France) Olivier Panis	158	157
5	(United States) Eddie Cheever	143	132
6	(Italy) Pierluigi Martini	124	119
7	(France) Philippe Alliot	116	109
8	(Finland) Mika Salo	111	109
9	(Italy) Elio de Angelis	110	108
10	(Sweden) Jo Bonnier	109	104

=== Most fastest laps without a World Championship ===
	Driver	Seasons	Entries	Starts	Fastest laps
1	(Austria) Gerhard Berger	1984–1997	210	210	21
2	(United Kingdom) Stirling Moss	1951–1961	67	66	19
2	(Australia) Mark Webber	2002–2013	217	215	19
2	(Finland) **Valtteri Bottas**	2013–2024, 2026	268	266	19
5	(United Kingdom) David Coulthard	1994–2009	247	246	18
6	(Brazil) Rubens Barrichello	1993–2011	326	322	17
6	(Australia) Daniel Ricciardo	2011–2024	258	257	17
8	(Switzerland) Clay Regazzoni	1970–1980	139	132	15
8	(Brazil) Felipe Massa	2002–2017	272	269	15
8	(Monaco) **Charles Leclerc**	2018–2026	194	192	15

== Podium finishes ==
=== Total podium finishes ===
	Driver	Seasons	Entries	Podiums	Percentage
1	(United Kingdom) **Lewis Hamilton**	2007–2026	401	209	52.12%
2	(Germany) Michael Schumacher	1991–2006, 2010–2012	308	155	50.32%
3	(Netherlands) **Max Verstappen**	2015–2026	254	140	55.12%
4	(Germany) Sebastian Vettel	2007–2022	300	122	40.67%
5	(France) Alain Prost	1980–1991, 1993	202	106	52.48%
5	(Spain) **Fernando Alonso**	2001, 2003–2018, 2021–2026	449	106	23.61%
7	(Finland) Kimi Räikkönen	2001–2009, 2012–2021	353	103	29.18%
8	(Brazil) Ayrton Senna	1984–1994	162	80	49.38%
9	(Brazil) Rubens Barrichello	1993–2011	326	68	20.86%
10	(Finland) **Valtteri Bottas**	2013–2024, 2026	268	67	25.00%

=== Percentage podium finishes (at least 15 starts) ===
	Driver	Seasons	Starts	Podiums	Percentage
1	(Argentina) Juan Manuel Fangio	1950–1951, 1953–1958	51	35	68.63%
2	(Italy) Giuseppe Farina	1950–1955	33	20 (Note: Farina's total of 20 podiums includes both 2nd and 3rd places at the 1955 Argentine Grand Prix.)	60.61%
3	(Argentina) José Froilán González	1950–1957, 1960	26	15	57.69%
4	(Netherlands) **Max Verstappen**	2015–2026	254	140	55.12%
5	(France) Alain Prost	1980–1991, 1993	199	106	53.27%
6	(Italy) Alberto Ascari	1950–1955	32	17	53.13%
7	(United Kingdom) **Lewis Hamilton**	2007–2026	401	209	52.12%
8	(Germany) Michael Schumacher	1991–2006, 2010–2012	306	155	50.65%
9	(Brazil) Ayrton Senna	1984–1994	161	80	49.69%
10	(United Kingdom) Jim Clark	1960–1968	72	32	44.44%

=== Most podium finishes in a season ===
	Driver	Season	Races	Podiums	Percentage	WDC
1	(Netherlands) **Max Verstappen**	2023	22	21	95.45%	1st
2	(Netherlands) **Max Verstappen**	2021	22	18	81.82%	1st
2	(United Kingdom) **Lando Norris**	2025	24	18	75.00%	1st
4	(Germany) Michael Schumacher	2002	17	17	100.00%	1st
4	(Germany) Sebastian Vettel	2011	19	17	89.47%	1st
4	(United Kingdom) **Lewis Hamilton**	2015	19	17	89.47%	1st
4	(United Kingdom) **Lewis Hamilton**	2016	21	17	80.95%	2nd
4	(United Kingdom) **Lewis Hamilton**	2018	21	17	80.95%	1st
4	(United Kingdom) **Lewis Hamilton**	2019	21	17	80.95%	1st
4	(United Kingdom) **Lewis Hamilton**	2021	22	17	77.27%	2nd
4	(Netherlands) **Max Verstappen**	2022	22	17	77.27%	1st

=== Highest percentage of podium finishes in a season ===
	Driver	Season	Races	Podiums	Percentage
1	(Germany) Michael Schumacher	2002	17	17	100.00%
2	(Netherlands) **Max Verstappen**	2023	22	21	95.45%
3	(United Kingdom) Jim Clark	1963	10	9	90.00%
4	(Germany) Sebastian Vettel	2011	19	17	89.47%
4	(United Kingdom) **Lewis Hamilton**	2015	19	17	89.47%
6	(France) Alain Prost	1988	16	14	87.50%
7	(Germany) Sebastian Vettel	2013	19	16	84.21%
7	(United Kingdom) **Lewis Hamilton**	2014	19	16	84.21%
9	(Germany) Michael Schumacher	2004	18	15	83.33%
10	(Germany) Michael Schumacher	2001	17	14	82.35%
10	(United Kingdom) **Lewis Hamilton**	2020	17	14	82.35%

=== Most consecutive podium finishes ===
	Driver	Podiums	Races
1	(Germany) Michael Schumacher	19	2001 United States – 2002 Japanese
2	(United Kingdom) **Lewis Hamilton**	16	2014 Italian – 2015 British
3	(Spain) **Fernando Alonso**	15	2005 Turkish – 2006 Canadian
3	(Netherlands) **Max Verstappen**	15	2022 Abu Dhabi – 2023 Italian
5	(Germany) Sebastian Vettel	11	2010 Brazilian – 2011 British
5	(Germany) Sebastian Vettel	11	2013 German – 2013 Brazilian
7	(United Kingdom) **Lewis Hamilton**	10	2018 Brazilian – 2019 French
7	(Netherlands) **Max Verstappen**	10	2025 Dutch – 2025 Abu Dhabi
9	(United Kingdom) Jim Clark	9	1963 Belgian – 1963 South African
9	(Austria) Niki Lauda	9	1975 Italian – 1976 Swedish
9	(Brazil) Nelson Piquet	9	1987 Monaco – 1987 Portuguese
9	(Germany) Michael Schumacher	9	2000 Hungarian – 2001 Brazilian
9	(Germany) Michael Schumacher	9	2004 European – 2004 Italian
9	(United Kingdom) **Lewis Hamilton**	9	2007 Australian – 2007 British
9	(United Kingdom) **Lewis Hamilton**	9	2018 British – 2018 United States
9	(Germany) Nico Rosberg	9	2015 Australian – 2015 British
9	(Germany) Nico Rosberg	9	2016 Belgian – 2016 Abu Dhabi
9	(Netherlands) **Max Verstappen**	9	2023 Japanese – 2024 Saudi Arabian
9	(Netherlands) **Max Verstappen**	9	2026 Italian – 2026 Las Vegas (ongoing)

=== Most consecutive podium finishes from first race of season ===
	Driver	Season	Podiums	Races
1	(Germany) Michael Schumacher	2002	17	Australian – Japanese
2	(Netherlands) **Max Verstappen**	2023	14	Bahrain – Italian
3	(Spain) **Fernando Alonso**	2006	9	Bahrain – Canadian
3	(United Kingdom) **Lewis Hamilton**	2007	9	Australian – British
3	(United Kingdom) **Lewis Hamilton**	2015	9	Australian – British
3	(Germany) Sebastian Vettel	2011	9	Australian – British
3	(Germany) Nico Rosberg	2015	9	Australian – British
8	(Germany) Nico Rosberg	2014	8	Australian – Austrian
8	(United Kingdom) **Lewis Hamilton**	2019	8	Australian – French
10	(Austria) Niki Lauda	1976	7	Brazilian – Swedish
10	(France) Alain Prost	1988	7	Brazilian – French
10	(Germany) Michael Schumacher	1994	7	Brazilian – French
10	(United Kingdom) Jenson Button	2009	7	Australian – Turkish

=== Most podiums at the same Grand Prix ===
	Driver	Podiums	Grand Prix	Seasons
1	(United Kingdom) **Lewis Hamilton**	15	British Grand Prix	2007, 2008, 2010, 2014, 2015, 2016, 2017, 2018, 2019, 2020, 2021, 2022, 2023, 2024, 2026
2	(Germany) Michael Schumacher	12	San Marino Grand Prix	1993, 1994, 1996, 1997, 1998, 1999, 2000, 2002, 2003, 2004, 2005, 2006
2	(Germany) Michael Schumacher	12	Spanish Grand Prix	1992, 1993, 1994, 1995, 1996, 1998, 1999, 2001, 2002, 2003, 2004, 2005
2	(Germany) Michael Schumacher	12	Canadian Grand Prix	1992, 1993, 1994, 1997, 1998, 2000, 2001, 2002, 2003, 2004, 2005, 2006
2	(United Kingdom) **Lewis Hamilton**	12	Spanish Grand Prix	2007, 2008, 2011, 2014, 2015, 2017, 2018, 2019, 2020, 2021, 2023, 2024
2	(United Kingdom) **Lewis Hamilton**	12	Hungarian Grand Prix	2007, 2009, 2012, 2013, 2014, 2016, 2018, 2019, 2020, 2021, 2022, 2024
2	(United Kingdom) **Lewis Hamilton**	12	Bahrain Grand Prix	2007, 2010, 2014, 2015, 2016, 2017, 2018, 2019, 2020, 2021, 2022, 2026
8	(France) Alain Prost	11	French Grand Prix	1981, 1982, 1983, 1985, 1986, 1987, 1988, 1989, 1990, 1991, 1993
8	(Germany) Michael Schumacher	11	French Grand Prix	1993, 1994, 1995, 1997, 1998, 2001, 2002, 2003, 2004, 2005, 2006
8	(United Kingdom) **Lewis Hamilton**	11	Belgian Grand Prix	2008, 2010, 2013, 2015, 2016, 2017, 2018, 2019, 2020, 2021, 2024
8	(United Kingdom) **Lewis Hamilton**	11	Canadian Grand Prix	2007, 2010, 2012, 2013, 2015, 2016, 2017, 2019, 2022, 2023, 2026

=== Most consecutive podiums at the same Grand Prix ===
	Driver	Podiums	Grand Prix	Seasons
1	(United Kingdom) **Lewis Hamilton**	11	British Grand Prix	2014 – 2024
2	(United Kingdom) **Lewis Hamilton**	9	Bahrain Grand Prix	2014 – 2022
3	(United Kingdom) **Lewis Hamilton**	8	Abu Dhabi Grand Prix	2014 – 2021
3	(United Kingdom) **Lewis Hamilton**	8	United States Grand Prix	2014 – 2022
3	(Netherlands) **Max Verstappen**	8	United States Grand Prix	2018 – 2026 (ongoing)
6	(United Kingdom) Graham Hill	7	Monaco Grand Prix	1963 – 1969
6	(France) Alain Prost	7	French Grand Prix	1985 – 1991
6	(Brazil) Ayrton Senna	7	Hungarian Grand Prix	1986 – 1992
6	(Germany) Michael Schumacher	7	Canadian Grand Prix	2000 – 2006
6	(Germany) Michael Schumacher	7	United States Grand Prix	2000 – 2006
6	(Germany) Sebastian Vettel	7	Japanese Grand Prix	2009 – 2015
6	(United Kingdom) **Lewis Hamilton**	7	Belgian Grand Prix	2015 – 2021
6	(Netherlands) **Max Verstappen**	7	Spanish Grand Prix	2018 – 2024

=== Most consecutive seasons with a podium ===
	Driver	Seasons	Total
1	(United Kingdom) **Lewis Hamilton**	2007–2024	18
2	(Germany) Michael Schumacher	1992–2006	15
3	(Germany) Sebastian Vettel	2008–2021	14
4	(United Kingdom) Nigel Mansell	1981–1992	12
4	(Austria) Gerhard Berger	1986–1997	12
4	(Spain) **Fernando Alonso**	2003–2014	12
7	(France) Alain Prost	1981–1991	11
7	(Netherlands) **Max Verstappen**	2016–2026 (ongoing)	11
9	(Brazil) Ayrton Senna	1984–1993	10
9	(United Kingdom) David Coulthard	1994–2003	10
9	(Germany) Ralf Schumacher	1997–2006	10

=== Most podiums with a single constructor ===
	Driver	Constructor	Seasons	Podiums	Starts	Percentage
1	(United Kingdom) **Lewis Hamilton**	Mercedes	2013–2024	153	246	62.20%
2	(Netherlands) **Max Verstappen**	Red Bull	2016–2026 (ongoing)	140	231	60.61%
3	(Germany) Michael Schumacher	Ferrari	1996–2006	116	179	64.80%
4	(Germany) Sebastian Vettel	Red Bull	2009–2014	65	113	57.52%
5	(France) Alain Prost	McLaren	1980, 1984–1989	63	107	58.88%
6	(Finland) **Valtteri Bottas**	Mercedes	2017–2021	58	101	57.43%
7	(Monaco) **Charles Leclerc**	Ferrari	2019–2026 (ongoing)	56	171	32.75%
8	(Brazil) Ayrton Senna	McLaren	1988–1993	55	96	57.29%
8	(Brazil) Rubens Barrichello	Ferrari	2000–2005	55	104	52.88%
8	(Germany) Nico Rosberg	Mercedes	2010–2016	55	136	40.44%
8	(Germany) Sebastian Vettel	Ferrari	2015–2020	55	119	46.22%

=== Youngest drivers to score a podium finish ===
(Only the first podium finish for each driver is listed)

	Driver	Age	Place	Race
1	(Netherlands) **Max Verstappen**	18 years, 228 days	1st	2016 Spanish Grand Prix
2	(Canada) **Lance Stroll**	18 years, 239 days	3rd	2017 Azerbaijan Grand Prix
3	(Italy) **Kimi Antonelli**	18 years, 294 days	3rd	2025 Canadian Grand Prix
4	(United Kingdom) **Lando Norris**	20 years, 235 days	3rd	2020 Austrian Grand Prix
5	(France) **Isack Hadjar**	20 years, 337 days	3rd	2025 Dutch Grand Prix
6	(Germany) Sebastian Vettel	21 years, 73 days	1st	2008 Italian Grand Prix
7	(Russia) Daniil Kvyat	21 years, 91 days	2nd	2015 Hungarian Grand Prix
8	(Denmark) Kevin Magnussen	21 years, 162 days	2nd	2014 Australian Grand Prix
9	(Monaco) **Charles Leclerc**	21 years, 166 days	3rd	2019 Bahrain Grand Prix
10	(Spain) **Fernando Alonso**	21 years, 237 days	3rd	2003 Malaysian Grand Prix

=== Oldest drivers to score a podium finish ===
(Only the last podium finish for each driver is listed)

	Driver	Age	Place	Race
1	(Italy) Luigi Fagioli	53 years, 22 days	1st	1951 French Grand Prix
2	(Monaco) Louis Chiron	50 years, 291 days	3rd	1950 Monaco Grand Prix
3	(Italy) Felice Bonetto	49 years, 363 days	3rd	1953 Dutch Grand Prix
4	(Italy) Piero Taruffi	48 years, 334 days	2nd	1955 Italian Grand Prix
5	(Italy) Giuseppe Farina	48 years, 218 days	3rd	1955 Belgian Grand Prix
6	(Argentina) Juan Manuel Fangio	46 years, 76 days	2nd	1957 Italian Grand Prix
7	(Germany) Karl Kling	44 years, 303 days	3rd	1955 British Grand Prix
8	(France) Louis Rosier	44 years, 225 days	3rd	1950 Belgian Grand Prix
9	(Italy) Luigi Villoresi	44 years, 120 days	3rd	1953 Italian Grand Prix
10	(Australia) Jack Brabham	44 years, 107 days	2nd	1970 British Grand Prix

=== Most races before scoring a podium finish ===
	Entry	Start	Driver	Race
1	242nd race	239th race	(Germany) **Nico Hülkenberg**	2025 British Grand Prix
2	101st race	101st race	(Spain) **Carlos Sainz Jr.**	2019 Brazilian Grand Prix
3	91st race	85th race	(United Kingdom) Martin Brundle	1992 French Grand Prix
4	73rd race	72nd race	(Finland) Mika Salo	1999 German Grand Prix
5	70th race	67th race	(United Kingdom) Johnny Herbert	1995 Spanish Grand Prix
6	69th race	68th race	(United Kingdom) Jenson Button	2004 Malaysian Grand Prix
7	67th race	66th race	(Spain) Pedro de la Rosa	2006 Hungarian Grand Prix
8	66th race	66th race	(France) **Esteban Ocon**	2020 Sakhir Grand Prix
9	62nd race	60th race	(Italy) Gianni Morbidelli	1995 Australian Grand Prix
10	58th race	57th race	(Brazil) Felipe Massa	2006 European Grand Prix

=== Most races without scoring a podium finish ===
	Driver	Seasons	Entries	Starts	Best result
1	(Germany) Adrian Sutil	2007–2011, 2013–2014	128	128	4th
2	(Italy) Pierluigi Martini	1984–1985, 1988–1995	124	119	4th
3	(Japan) **Yuki Tsunoda**	2021–2026	117	114	4th
4	(France) Philippe Alliot	1984–1990, 1993–1994	116	109	5th
5	(Brazil) Pedro Diniz	1995–2000	99	98	5th
6	(Sweden) Marcus Ericsson	2014–2018	97	97	8th
7	(Japan) Ukyo Katayama	1992–1997	97	95	5th
8	(United Kingdom) Jonathan Palmer	1983–1989	88	83	4th
9	(Switzerland) Marc Surer	1979–1986	88	82	4th
10	(Italy) Vitantonio Liuzzi	2005–2007, 2009–2011	81	80	6th

=== Most podium finishes without a World Championship ===
	Driver	Seasons	Entries	Wins	Podiums
1	(Brazil) Rubens Barrichello	1993–2011	326	11	68
2	(Finland) **Valtteri Bottas**	2013–2024, 2026	268	10	67
3	(United Kingdom) David Coulthard	1994–2008	247	13	62
4	(Monaco) **Charles Leclerc**	2018–2026	194	9	56
5	(Austria) Gerhard Berger	1984–1997	210	10	48
6	(Argentina) Carlos Reutemann	1972–1982	146	12	45
7	(Australia) Mark Webber	2002–2013	217	9	42
8	(Brazil) Felipe Massa	2002, 2004–2017	272	11	41
9	(Mexico) **Sergio Pérez**	2011–2024, 2026	306	6	39
10	(Italy) Riccardo Patrese	1977–1993	258	6	37

=== Most podium finishes before first win ===
	Driver	Podiums
1	(France) Patrick Depailler	15
1	(France) Jean Alesi	15
1	(Finland) Mika Häkkinen	15
1	(United Kingdom) Eddie Irvine	15
1	(United Kingdom) **Lando Norris**	15
6	(United States) Richie Ginther	13
6	(United Kingdom) Jenson Button	13
8	(Brazil) Rubens Barrichello	12
9	(Finland) **Valtteri Bottas**	11
9	(Spain) **Carlos Sainz Jr.**	11

=== Most podium finishes without a win ===
	Driver	Entries	Starts	Podiums
1	(Germany) Nick Heidfeld	185	183	13
2	(Sweden) Stefan Johansson	103	79	12
3	(New Zealand) Chris Amon	108	97	11
4	(France) Romain Grosjean	181	179	10
5	(France) Jean Behra	53	52	9
5	(United States) Eddie Cheever	143	132	9
5	(United Kingdom) Martin Brundle	165	158	9
8	(Italy) Luigi Villoresi	34	31	8
9	(Italy) Andrea de Cesaris	214	208	5
10	(United Kingdom) Derek Warwick	162	147	4
10	(France) **Isack Hadjar**	42	41	4

== Points ==
Throughout the history of the World Championship, the points-scoring positions and the number of points awarded to each position have varied, along with the number of events per season in which points could be scored.

=== Total career points ===
	Driver	Points
1	(United Kingdom) **Lewis Hamilton**	5285.5
2	(Netherlands) **Max Verstappen**	3748.5
3	(Germany) Sebastian Vettel	3098
4	(Spain) **Fernando Alonso**	2400
5	(Monaco) **Charles Leclerc**	1922
6	(Finland) Kimi Räikkönen	1873
7	(Finland) **Valtteri Bottas**	1797
8	(United Kingdom) **Lando Norris**	1694
9	(Mexico) **Sergio Pérez**	1638
10	(Germany) Nico Rosberg	1594.5

=== Highest average points per race started (at least 15 starts) ===
	Driver	Starts	Points	Average
1	(Netherlands) **Max Verstappen**	254	3748.5	14.76
2	(United Kingdom) **Lewis Hamilton**	401	5285.5	13.18
3	(Italy) **Kimi Antonelli**	45	552	12.27
4	(Australia) **Oscar Piastri**	89	966	10.85
5	(Germany) Sebastian Vettel	299	3098	10.36
6	(Monaco) **Charles Leclerc**	192	1922	10.01
7	(United Kingdom) **Lando Norris**	172	1694	9.85
8	(Germany) Nico Rosberg	206	1594.5	7.74
9	(United Kingdom) **George Russell**	173	1297	7.50
10	(Finland) **Valtteri Bottas**	266	1797	6.76

=== Total points-scoring races ===
	Driver	Points finishes
1	(United Kingdom) **Lewis Hamilton**	354
2	(Spain) **Fernando Alonso**	278
3	(Germany) Michael Schumacher	221
4	(Finland) Kimi Räikkönen	219
4	(Germany) Sebastian Vettel	219
6	(Netherlands) **Max Verstappen**	216
7	(Mexico) **Sergio Pérez**	188
8	(Brazil) Felipe Massa	165
9	(United Kingdom) Jenson Button	162
10	(Spain) **Carlos Sainz Jr.**	161

=== Highest percentage of points-scoring races (at least 15 starts) ===
	Driver	Starts	Points finishes	Percentage
1	(United Kingdom) **Lewis Hamilton**	401	354	88.28%
2	(Netherlands) **Max Verstappen**	254	216	85.04%
3	(Argentina) Juan Manuel Fangio	51	43	84.31%
4	(Australia) **Oscar Piastri**	89	75	84.27%
5	(United Kingdom) **Lando Norris**	172	142	82.56%
6	(Monaco) **Charles Leclerc**	192	155	80.73%
7	(Italy) **Kimi Antonelli**	45	35	77.78%
8	(Italy) Giuseppe Farina	33	25	75.76%
9	(Germany) Sebastian Vettel	299	219	73.24%
10	(Argentina) José Froilán González	26	19	73.08%

=== Most championship points in a season ===
	Driver	Points	Season	Races	Percentage	WDC
1	(Netherlands) **Max Verstappen**	575	2023	22	92.74%	1st
2	(Netherlands) **Max Verstappen**	454	2022	22	76.17%	1st
3	(Netherlands) **Max Verstappen**	437	2024	24	65.03%	1st
4	(United Kingdom) **Lando Norris**	423	2025	24	65.28%	1st
5	(Netherlands) **Max Verstappen**	421	2025	24	64.97%	2nd
6	(United Kingdom) **Lewis Hamilton**	413	2019	21	75.64%	1st
7	(Australia) **Oscar Piastri**	410	2025	24	63.27%	3rd
8	(United Kingdom) **Lewis Hamilton**	408	2018	21	77.71%	1st
9	(Italy) **Kimi Antonelli**	402*	2026	21*	70.16%*	1st
10	(Germany) Sebastian Vettel	397	2013	19	83.58%	1st

Notes

- * Season still in progress.

=== Highest average points per championship ===
	Driver	Points	Season	Races	Average	WDC
1	(Netherlands) **Max Verstappen**	575	2023	22	26.14	1st
2	(Germany) Sebastian Vettel	397	2013	19	20.89	1st
3	(Netherlands) **Max Verstappen**	454	2022	22	20.64	1st
4	(Germany) Sebastian Vettel	392	2011	19	20.63	1st
5	(United Kingdom) **Lewis Hamilton**	347	2020	17	20.41	1st
6	(United Kingdom) **Lewis Hamilton**	384	2014	19†	20.21	1st
7	(United Kingdom) **Lewis Hamilton**	381	2015	19	20.05	1st
8	(United Kingdom) **Lewis Hamilton**	413	2019	21	19.67	1st
9	(United Kingdom) **Lewis Hamilton**	408	2018	21	19.43	1st
10	(Italy) **Kimi Antonelli**	402*	2026	21*	19.14*	1st

Notes

- † Double points awarded in last race.
- * Season still in progress.

=== Highest percentage of maximum points in a season ===
	Driver	Season	Races	Points	Percentage	WDC
1	(Netherlands) **Max Verstappen**	2023	22	575	92.74%	1st
2	(Germany) Michael Schumacher	2002	17	144	84.71%	1st
3	(Germany) Sebastian Vettel	2013	19	397	83.58%	1st
4	(Germany) Sebastian Vettel	2011	19	392	82.53%	1st
5	(Germany) Michael Schumacher	2004	18	148	82.22%	1st
6	(United Kingdom) Jim Clark	1963	10	73	81.11%	1st
7	(United Kingdom) **Lewis Hamilton**	2015	19	381	80.21%	1st
8	(United Kingdom) **Lewis Hamilton**	2020	17	347	78.51%	1st
9	(United Kingdom) **Lewis Hamilton**	2018	21	408	77.71%	1st
10	(United Kingdom) **Lewis Hamilton**	2014	19†	384	76.80%	1st

Notes

- † Double points awarded in last race.

=== Most consecutive points finishes ===
	Driver	Points finishes	Races
1	(United Kingdom) **Lewis Hamilton**	48	2018 British Grand Prix – 2020 Bahrain Grand Prix
2	(Netherlands) **Max Verstappen**	43	2022 Emilia Romagna Grand Prix – 2024 Saudi Arabian Grand Prix
3	(Australia) **Oscar Piastri**	34	2024 Emilia Romagna Grand Prix – 2025 Italian Grand Prix
4	(United Kingdom) **Lewis Hamilton**	33	2016 Japanese Grand Prix – 2018 French Grand Prix
5	(Netherlands) **Max Verstappen**	31	2024 Japanese Grand Prix – 2025 Canadian Grand Prix
6	(Finland) Kimi Räikkönen	27	2012 Bahrain Grand Prix – 2013 Hungarian Grand Prix
7	(Germany) Michael Schumacher	24	2001 Hungarian Grand Prix – 2003 Malaysian Grand Prix
8	(Spain) **Fernando Alonso**	23	2011 European Grand Prix – 2012 Hungarian Grand Prix
9	(Finland) **Valtteri Bottas**	22	2018 British Grand Prix – 2019 British Grand Prix
9	(United Kingdom) **Lando Norris**	22	2024 British Grand Prix – 2025 Spanish Grand Prix

Notes

- For inclusion in this table, the driver must have scored points in the race, not just the sprint.

=== Most consecutive points scored ===
	Driver	Points scored	Races
1	(Netherlands) **Max Verstappen**	1055 (Note: Including sprint points.)	2022 Emilia Romagna Grand Prix – 2024 Saudi Arabian Grand Prix
2	(United Kingdom) **Lewis Hamilton**	1008 (Note: See talk page for supporting calculation. Autosport listed it as 998.)	2018 British Grand Prix – 2020 Bahrain Grand Prix
3	(United Kingdom) **Lewis Hamilton**	623	2016 Japanese Grand Prix – 2018 French Grand Prix
4	(Australia) **Oscar Piastri**	575	2024 Emilia Romagna Grand Prix – 2025 Italian Grand Prix
5	(Netherlands) **Max Verstappen**	541	2024 Japanese Grand Prix – 2025 Canadian Grand Prix
6	(Germany) Sebastian Vettel	424	2010 Brazilian Grand Prix – 2011 Indian Grand Prix
7	(United Kingdom) **Lewis Hamilton**	420	2014 Italian Grand Prix – 2015 Italian Grand Prix
8	(United Kingdom) **Lando Norris**	394	2024 British Grand Prix – 2025 Spanish Grand Prix
9	(Finland) **Valtteri Bottas**	338	2018 British Grand Prix – 2019 British Grand Prix
10	(Spain) **Fernando Alonso**	334	2011 European Grand Prix – 2012 Hungarian Grand Prix

Notes

- For inclusion in this table, the driver must have scored points in the race, not just the sprint; however, sprint points are included in the total.

=== Most consecutive seasons with points finishes ===
	Driver	Seasons	Total
1	(United Kingdom) **Lewis Hamilton**	2007–2026 (ongoing)	20
2	(United Kingdom) Jenson Button	2000–2016	17
3	(Germany) Michael Schumacher	1991–2006	16
3	(Spain) Fernando Alonso	2003–2018	16
3	(Germany) Sebastian Vettel	2007–2022	16
6	(United Kingdom) David Coulthard	1994–2003	15
7	(Brazil) Rubens Barrichello	1993–2006	14
7	(Brazil) Felipe Massa	2004–2017	14
7	(Mexico) **Sergio Perez**	2011–2024	14
10	(Australia) Jack Brabham	1958–1970	13
10	(United Kingdom) Graham Hill	1960–1972	13
10	(Brazil) Nelson Piquet	1979–1991	13
10	(Austria) Gerhard Berger	1985–1997	13
10	(Italy) Jarno Trulli	1997–2009	13
10	(Australia) Daniel Ricciardo	2012–2024	13

=== Youngest drivers to score points ===
(Only the first points finish for each driver is listed)

	Driver	Age	Place	Race
1	(Netherlands) **Max Verstappen**	17 years, 180 days	7th	2015 Malaysian Grand Prix
2	(Italy) **Kimi Antonelli**	18 years, 203 days	4th	2025 Australian Grand Prix
3	(United Kingdom) **Arvid Lindblad**	18 years, 212 days	8th	2026 Australian Grand Prix
4	(Canada) **Lance Stroll**	18 years, 225 days	9th	2017 Canadian Grand Prix
5	(United Kingdom) **Oliver Bearman**	18 years, 305 days	7th	2024 Saudi Arabian Grand Prix
6	(United Kingdom) **Lando Norris**	19 years, 138 days	6th	2019 Bahrain Grand Prix
7	(Russia) Daniil Kvyat	19 years, 324 days	9th	2014 Australian Grand Prix
8	(Germany) Sebastian Vettel	19 years, 349 days	8th	2007 United States Grand Prix
9	(Spain) Jaime Alguersuari	20 years, 12 days	9th	2010 Malaysian Grand Prix
10	(United Kingdom) Jenson Button	20 years, 67 days	6th	2000 Brazilian Grand Prix

=== Oldest drivers to score points ===
(Only the last points finish for each driver is listed)

	Driver	Age	Place	Race
1	(France) Philippe Étancelin	53 years, 249 days	5th	1950 Italian Grand Prix
2	(Italy) Luigi Fagioli	53 years, 22 days	1st	1951 French Grand Prix
3	(Monaco) Louis Chiron	50 years, 291 days	3rd	1950 Monaco Grand Prix
4	(France) Louis Rosier	50 years, 274 days	5th	1956 German Grand Prix
5	(Italy) Felice Bonetto	50 years, 75 days	4th	1953 Swiss Grand Prix
6	(Italy) Piero Taruffi	48 years, 334 days	2nd	1955 Italian Grand Prix
7	(Italy) Giuseppe Farina	48 years, 218 days	3rd	1955 Belgian Grand Prix
8	(Brazil) Chico Landi	48 years, 191 days	4th	1956 Argentine Grand Prix
9	(France) Yves Giraud-Cabantous	47 years, 252 days	5th	1951 Belgian Grand Prix
10	(Italy) Luigi Villoresi	47 years, 18 days	5th	1956 Belgian Grand Prix

=== Most races before scoring points ===
	Entry	Start	Driver	Race
1	70th	44th	(Italy) Nicola Larini	1994 San Marino Grand Prix
2	42nd	40th	(United Kingdom) Jonathan Palmer	1987 Monaco Grand Prix
3	37th	37th	(United Kingdom) **George Russell**	2020 Sakhir Grand Prix
4	32nd	28th	(France) Philippe Alliot	1986 Mexican Grand Prix
4	32nd	30th	(Italy) Alessandro Nannini	1988 San Marino Grand Prix
4	32nd	31st	(Germany) Mick Schumacher	2022 British Grand Prix
7	31st	26th	(Italy) Alex Caffi	1989 Monaco Grand Prix
7	31st	29th	(Japan) Ukyo Katayama	1994 Brazilian Grand Prix
9	28th	28th	(Canada) Nicholas Latifi	2021 Hungarian Grand Prix
10	26th	25th	(United States) Harry Schell	1956 Belgian Grand Prix

=== Most races without scoring points ===
	Driver	Entries	Starts
1	(Italy) Luca Badoer	58	50 (Note: Some sources give him 50 starts, others give him 51 starts.)
2	(France) Charles Pic	39	39
3	(United Kingdom) Max Chilton	35	35
4	(United States) Brett Lunger	43	34
5	(Japan) Toranosuke Takagi	32	32
6	(United Kingdom) Mike Beuttler	29	28
6	(Brazil) Enrique Bernoldi	28	28
6	(United States) Scott Speed	28	28
9	(Brazil) Ricardo Rosset	33	26
10	(United Kingdom) Rupert Keegan	37	25
10	(Netherlands) Huub Rothengatter	30	25

=== Most career points without a World Championship ===
	Driver	Points	Best WDC finish
1	(Monaco) **Charles Leclerc**	1922	2nd in 2022
2	(Finland) **Valtteri Bottas**	1797	2nd in 2019 and 2020
3	(Mexico) **Sergio Pérez**	1638	2nd in 2023
4	(Spain) **Carlos Sainz Jr.**	1347.5	5th in 2021, 2022 and 2024
5	(Australia) Daniel Ricciardo	1329	3rd in 2014 and 2016
6	(United Kingdom) **George Russell**	1297	4th in 2022 and 2025
7	(Brazil) Felipe Massa	1167	2nd in 2008
8	(Australia) Mark Webber	1047.5	3rd in 2010, 2011, and 2013
9	(Australia) **Oscar Piastri**	966	3rd in 2025
10	(Brazil) Rubens Barrichello	658	2nd in 2002 and 2004

=== Most points without a win ===
	Driver	Entries	Starts	Points
1	(Germany) **Nico Hülkenberg**	275	270	636
2	(France) Romain Grosjean	181	179	391
3	(Canada) **Lance Stroll**	214	210	325
4	(Thailand) **Alexander Albon**	151	147	318
5	(Germany) Nick Heidfeld	185	183	259
6	(Russia) Daniil Kvyat	112	110	202
6	(Denmark) Kevin Magnussen	187	185	202
8	(France) **Isack Hadjar**	42	41	173
9	(New Zealand) **Liam Lawson**	56	56	133
10	(Japan) Kamui Kobayashi	76	75	125
10	(Japan) **Yuki Tsunoda**	117	114	125

=== World Champions with fewest career points ===
	Driver	Points	WDC year(s)
1	(United States) Phil Hill	98	1961
2	(Austria) Jochen Rindt	109	1970
3	(Italy) Giuseppe Farina	127.33	1950
4	(United Kingdom) Mike Hawthorn	127.64	1958
5	(Italy) Alberto Ascari	140.14	1952, 1953
6	(Finland) Keke Rosberg	159.50	1982
7	(United Kingdom) James Hunt	179	1976
8	(United Kingdom) John Surtees	180	1964
8	(United States) Mario Andretti	180	1978
10	(Australia) Alan Jones	206	1980

== Races finished ==
=== Total career race finishes ===
	Driver	Starts	Races finished	Percentage
1	(United Kingdom) **Lewis Hamilton**	401	363	90.52%
2	(Spain) **Fernando Alonso**	446	357	80.04%
3	(Finland) Kimi Räikkönen	349	278	79.66%
4	(Mexico) **Sergio Pérez**	302	257	85.10%
5	(Germany) Sebastian Vettel	299	254	84.95%
6	(Germany) Michael Schumacher	306	237	77.45%
7	(United Kingdom) Jenson Button	306	230	75.16%
8	(Finland) **Valtteri Bottas**	266	228	85.71%
9	(Brazil) Felipe Massa	269	225	83.64%
10	(Brazil) Rubens Barrichello	322	224	69.57%

=== Most consecutive race finishes ===
	Driver	Races finished	Races
1	(United Kingdom) **Lewis Hamilton**	48	2018 British – 2020 Bahrain
2	(Australia) **Oscar Piastri**	44	2023 Mexico City – 2025 Italian
3	(Netherlands) **Max Verstappen**	43	2022 Emilia Romagna – 2024 Saudi Arabian
4	(United Kingdom) **George Russell**	38	2024 Dutch – 2026 Miami
5	(Australia) Daniel Ricciardo	34	2020 Styrian – 2021 Mexico City
6	(Germany) Nick Heidfeld	33	2007 Chinese – 2009 Italian
6	(United Kingdom) **Lewis Hamilton**	33	2016 Japanese – 2018 French
8	(Spain) **Carlos Sainz Jr.**	31	2020 Eifel – 2022 Saudi Arabian
8	(Netherlands) **Max Verstappen**	31	2024 Japanese – 2025 Canadian
10	(Finland) Kimi Räikkönen	30	2012 Australian – 2013 Hungarian

=== Total career race retirements ===
	Driver	Starts	DNFs	Percentage
1	(Italy) Riccardo Patrese	256	147	57.42%
1	(Italy) Andrea de Cesaris (Note: Some sources attribute the record at 148 due to some conjecture over whether De Cesaris had 147 or 148 retirements; De Cesaris ran out of fuel and pushed his car over the finish line at the 1987 Belgian Grand Prix.)	208	147	70.67%
3	(Italy) Michele Alboreto	194	102	52.58%
4	(Brazil) Rubens Barrichello	322	96	29.81%
5	(Austria) Gerhard Berger	210	95	45.24%
6	(United Kingdom) Nigel Mansell	187	92	49.20%
6	(Italy) Jarno Trulli	252	92	36.51%
8	(Spain) **Fernando Alonso**	446	89	19.96%
9	(France) Jacques Laffite	176	87	49.43%
9	(France) Jean Alesi	201	87	43.28%

== Race leaders ==
=== Led every lap, total races ===
	Driver	Starts	Races	Percentage
1	(United Kingdom) **Lewis Hamilton**	401	23	5.74%
2	(Brazil) Ayrton Senna	161	19	11.80%
2	(Netherlands) **Max Verstappen**	254	19	7.48%
4	(Germany) Sebastian Vettel	299	15	5.02%
5	(United Kingdom) Jim Clark	72	13	18.06%
6	(United Kingdom) Jackie Stewart	99	11	11.11%
6	(Germany) Michael Schumacher	306	11	3.59%
8	(United Kingdom) Nigel Mansell	187	9	4.81%
9	(Italy) Alberto Ascari	32	7	21.88%
9	(France) Alain Prost	199	7	3.52%
9	(Germany) Nico Rosberg	206	7	3.40%

=== Led for at least one lap, total races ===
	Driver	Starts	Races led	Percentage
1	(United Kingdom) **Lewis Hamilton**	401	196	48.88%
2	(Germany) Michael Schumacher	306	142	46.41%
3	(Netherlands) **Max Verstappen**	254	117	46.06%
4	(Germany) Sebastian Vettel	299	107	35.79%
5	(Spain) **Fernando Alonso**	446	87	19.51%
6	(Brazil) Ayrton Senna	161	86	53.42%
7	(France) Alain Prost	199	84	42.21%
8	(Finland) Kimi Räikkönen	349	83	23.78%
9	(United Kingdom) David Coulthard	246	62	25.20%
10	(Brazil) Nelson Piquet	204	58	28.43%

=== Led for at least one lap, percentage of races (at least 15 starts) ===
	Driver	Starts	Races led	Percentage
1	(Argentina) Juan Manuel Fangio	51	38	74.51%
2	(Italy) Alberto Ascari	32	21	65.63%
3	(United Kingdom) Jim Clark	72	43	59.72%
4	(Brazil) Ayrton Senna	161	86	53.42%
5	(United Kingdom) Jackie Stewart	99	51	51.52%
6	(United Kingdom) **Lewis Hamilton**	401	196	48.88%
7	(United Kingdom) Stirling Moss	66	31	46.97%
8	(Germany) Michael Schumacher	306	142	46.41%
9	(Netherlands) **Max Verstappen**	254	117	46.06%
10	(Italy) **Kimi Antonelli**	45	20	44.44%

=== Led for at least one lap, youngest leaders ===
(Only the first race led for each driver is listed)

	Driver	Age	Race
1	(Italy) **Kimi Antonelli**	18 years, 224 days	2025 Japanese Grand Prix
2	(Netherlands) **Max Verstappen**	18 years, 228 days	2016 Spanish Grand Prix
3	(Germany) Sebastian Vettel	20 years, 89 days	2007 Japanese Grand Prix
4	(Monaco) **Charles Leclerc**	21 years, 166 days	2019 Bahrain Grand Prix
5	(Switzerland) Sébastien Buemi	21 years, 225 days	2010 Canadian Grand Prix
6	(Spain) **Fernando Alonso**	21 years, 237 days	2003 Malaysian Grand Prix
7	(Poland) Robert Kubica	21 years, 277 days	2006 Italian Grand Prix
8	(Mexico) Esteban Gutiérrez	21 years, 280 days	2013 Spanish Grand Prix
9	(United States) Jimmy Davies	21 years, 285 days	1951 Indianapolis 500
10	(United Kingdom) **Lando Norris**	21 years, 303 days	2021 Italian Grand Prix

=== Led for at least one lap, oldest leaders ===
(Only the last race led for each driver is listed)

	Driver	Age	Race
1	(Italy) Luigi Fagioli	52 years, 9 days	1950 Belgian Grand Prix
2	(Italy) Felice Bonetto	48 years, 35 days	1951 British Grand Prix
3	(Italy) Giuseppe Farina	47 years, 233 days	1954 Belgian Grand Prix
4	(Argentina) Juan Manuel Fangio	46 years, 209 days	1958 Argentine Grand Prix
5	(Italy) Piero Taruffi	45 years, 219 days	1952 Swiss Grand Prix
6	(Australia) Jack Brabham	44 years, 107 days	1970 British Grand Prix
7	(United States) Mauri Rose	44 years, 4 days	1950 Indianapolis 500
8	(Germany) Karl Kling	43 years, 354 days	1954 Italian Grand Prix
9	(France) Raymond Sommer	43 years, 291 days	1950 Belgian Grand Prix
10	(United States) Paul Russo	43 years, 50 days	1957 Indianapolis 500

=== Total laps led ===
	Driver	Laps
1	(United Kingdom) **Lewis Hamilton**	5530
2	(Germany) Michael Schumacher	5111
3	(Netherlands) **Max Verstappen**	4068
4	(Germany) Sebastian Vettel	3501
5	(Brazil) Ayrton Senna	2931
6	(France) Alain Prost	2683
7	(United Kingdom) Nigel Mansell	2091
8	(United Kingdom) Jim Clark	1943
9	(United Kingdom) Jackie Stewart	1919
10	(Spain) **Fernando Alonso**	1773

=== Total distance led ===
	Driver	Distance (km)
1	(United Kingdom) **Lewis Hamilton**	28169
2	(Germany) Michael Schumacher	24146
3	(Netherlands) **Max Verstappen**	20193
4	(Germany) Sebastian Vettel	18156
5	(Brazil) Ayrton Senna	13430
6	(France) Alain Prost	12477
7	(United Kingdom) Jim Clark	10125
8	(United Kingdom) Nigel Mansell	9651
9	(Argentina) Juan Manuel Fangio	9316
10	(United Kingdom) Jackie Stewart	9183

=== Most consecutive races led for at least one lap ===
	Driver	Races led	Races
1	(United Kingdom) **Lewis Hamilton**	18	2014 Hungarian Grand Prix – 2015 British Grand Prix
2	(United Kingdom) Jackie Stewart	17	1968 United States Grand Prix – 1970 Belgian Grand Prix
3	(Germany) Michael Schumacher	15	2004 Australian Grand Prix – 2004 Italian Grand Prix
4	(United Kingdom) **Lewis Hamilton**	14	2020 Styrian Grand Prix – 2020 Bahrain Grand Prix
4	(Netherlands) **Max Verstappen**	14	2023 Japanese Grand Prix – 2024 Emilia Romagna Grand Prix
6	(Germany) Sebastian Vettel	13	2010 Japanese Grand Prix – 2011 British Grand Prix
6	(Germany) Sebastian Vettel	13	2013 Canadian Grand Prix – 2013 Brazilian Grand Prix
6	(Italy) **Kimi Antonelli**	13	2026 Chinese Grand Prix – 2026 Spanish Grand Prix
9	(Brazil) Ayrton Senna	12	1989 Spanish Grand Prix – 1990 German Grand Prix
9	(Germany) Michael Schumacher	12	1994 European Grand Prix – 1995 German Grand Prix
9	(Spain) **Fernando Alonso**	12	2005 Chinese Grand Prix – 2006 French Grand Prix
9	(United Kingdom) **Lewis Hamilton**	12	2019 Bahrain Grand Prix – 2019 Belgian Grand Prix
9	(Netherlands) **Max Verstappen**	12	2023 Australian Grand Prix – 2023 Italian Grand Prix

=== Most consecutive laps in the lead ===
	Driver	Laps led	Races
1	(Italy) Alberto Ascari	305	1952 Belgian Grand Prix – 1952 Dutch Grand Prix
2	(Brazil) Ayrton Senna	264	1988 British Grand Prix – 1988 Italian Grand Prix
3	(Netherlands) **Max Verstappen**	248	2023 Miami Grand Prix – 2023 Austrian Grand Prix
4	(Brazil) Ayrton Senna	237	1989 San Marino Grand Prix – 1989 United States Grand Prix
5	(United Kingdom) Nigel Mansell	235	1992 Brazilian Grand Prix – 1992 Monaco Grand Prix
6	(Germany) Sebastian Vettel	205	2012 Singapore Grand Prix – 2012 Indian Grand Prix
7	(United Kingdom) Jim Clark	186	1963 Mexican Grand Prix – 1964 Monaco Grand Prix
8	(United Kingdom) Jim Clark	165	1963 Belgian Grand Prix – 1963 French Grand Prix
9	(Finland) Kimi Räikkönen	162	2005 Spanish Grand Prix – 2005 European Grand Prix
10	(Australia) Mark Webber	159	2010 Spanish Grand Prix – 2010 Turkish Grand Prix

=== Most consecutive distance led ===
	Driver	Distance (km)	Races
1	(Italy) Alberto Ascari	2075	1952 Belgian Grand Prix – 1952 Dutch Grand Prix
2	(Brazil) Ayrton Senna	1435	1988 British Grand Prix – 1988 Italian Grand Prix
3	(United Kingdom) Jim Clark	1227	1963 Belgian Grand Prix – 1963 French Grand Prix
4	(United Kingdom) Jim Clark	1150	1965 Belgian Grand Prix – 1965 British Grand Prix
5	(Germany) Sebastian Vettel	1111	2012 Singapore Grand Prix – 2012 Indian Grand Prix
6	(Netherlands) **Max Verstappen**	1030	2023 Miami Grand Prix – 2023 Austrian Grand Prix
7	(United Kingdom) Nigel Mansell	1017	1992 Brazilian Grand Prix – 1992 Monaco Grand Prix
8	(Brazil) Ayrton Senna	979	1989 San Marino Grand Prix – 1989 United States Grand Prix
9	(Argentina) Juan Manuel Fangio	937	1955 Belgian Grand Prix – 1955 British Grand Prix
10	(Australia) Jack Brabham	847	1960 Dutch Grand Prix – 1960 French Grand Prix

=== Most races led in a season ===
	Driver	Season	Total races	Races led	Percentage
1	(Netherlands) **Max Verstappen**	2023	22	20	90.91%
2	(United Kingdom) **Lewis Hamilton**	2019	21	19	90.48%
3	(Germany) Sebastian Vettel	2013	19	18	94.74%
3	(Italy) **Kimi Antonelli**	2026	21*	18	85.71%*
5	(Germany) Sebastian Vettel	2011	19	17	89.47%
5	(United Kingdom) **Lewis Hamilton**	2015	19	17	89.47%
5	(Netherlands) **Max Verstappen**	2022	22	17	77.27%
8	(Germany) Michael Schumacher	2004	18	16	88.89%
8	(Netherlands) **Max Verstappen**	2021	22	16	72.73%
8	(Netherlands) **Max Verstappen**	2024	24	16	66.67%

Notes

- * Season still in progress.

=== Most laps led in a season ===
	Driver	Season	Total laps	Laps led	Percentage
1	(Netherlands) **Max Verstappen**	2023	1325	1003	75.70%
2	(Germany) Sebastian Vettel	2011	1133	739	65.23%
3	(United Kingdom) Nigel Mansell	1992	1036	694	66.99%
4	(Germany) Sebastian Vettel	2013	1131	684	60.48%
5	(Germany) Michael Schumacher	2004	1122	683	60.87%
6	(Netherlands) **Max Verstappen**	2021	1297	652	50.27%
7	(Germany) Michael Schumacher	1994	1046	646	61.76%
8	(Netherlands) **Max Verstappen**	2022	1294	616	47.60%
9	(United Kingdom) **Lewis Hamilton**	2020	1037	613	59.11%
10	(United Kingdom) **Lewis Hamilton**	2015	1149	587	51.09%

=== Most distance led in a season ===
	Driver	Season	Total distance (km)	Distance led (km)	Percentage
1	(Netherlands) **Max Verstappen**	2023	6697	4912	73.35%
2	(Germany) Sebastian Vettel	2011	5794	3794	65.48%
3	(Germany) Sebastian Vettel	2013	5792	3637	62.79%
4	(Germany) Michael Schumacher	2004	5473	3357	61.34%
5	(United Kingdom) Nigel Mansell	1992	4849	3293	67.91%
6	(Netherlands) **Max Verstappen**	2022	6511	3164	48.59%
7	(United Kingdom) **Lewis Hamilton**	2020	5229	3161	60.45%
8	(United Kingdom) **Lewis Hamilton**	2015	5778	3095	53.57%
9	(Netherlands) **Max Verstappen**	2021	6409	2988	46.62%
10	(United Kingdom) **Lewis Hamilton**	2017	6063	2871	47.35%

=== Highest percentage of races led in a season ===
	Driver	Season	Total races	Races led	Percentage
1	(United Kingdom) Jackie Stewart	1969	11	11	100.00%
2	(Germany) Sebastian Vettel	2013	19	18	94.74%
3	(France) Alain Prost	1993	16	15	93.75%
4	(Netherlands) **Max Verstappen**	2023	22	20	90.91%
5	(United Kingdom) **Lewis Hamilton**	2019	21	19	90.48%
6	(United Kingdom) Jim Clark	1963	10	9	90.00%
7	(Germany) Sebastian Vettel	2011	19	17	89.47%
7	(United Kingdom) **Lewis Hamilton**	2015	19	17	89.47%
9	(United Kingdom) Graham Hill	1962	9	8	88.89%
9	(Germany) Michael Schumacher	2004	18	16	88.89%

=== Highest percentage of laps led in a season ===
	Driver	Season	Total laps	Laps led	Percentage
1	(Netherlands) **Max Verstappen**	2023	1325	1003	75.70%
2	(United Kingdom) Jim Clark	1963	708	506	71.47%
3	(United Kingdom) Nigel Mansell	1992	1036	694	66.99%
4	(Germany) Sebastian Vettel	2011	1133	739	65.23%
5	(Germany) Michael Schumacher	1994	1046	646	61.76%
6	(Germany) Michael Schumacher	2004	1122	683	60.87%
7	(Germany) Sebastian Vettel	2013	1131	684	60.48%
8	(United Kingdom) **Lewis Hamilton**	2020	1037	613	59.11%
9	(Italy) Alberto Ascari	1953	736	418	56.79%
10	(Finland) Mika Häkkinen	1998	1015	576	56.75%

=== Highest percentage of distance led in a season ===
	Driver	Season	Total distance (km)	Distance led (km)	Percentage
1	(Netherlands) **Max Verstappen**	2023	6697	4912	73.35%
2	(United Kingdom) Jim Clark	1963	3829	2759	72.06%
3	(United Kingdom) Nigel Mansell	1992	4849	3293	67.91%
4	(Germany) Sebastian Vettel	2011	5794	3794	65.48%
5	(Germany) Sebastian Vettel	2013	5792	3637	62.79%
6	(United Kingdom) Jim Clark	1965	3645	2260	62.00%
7	(Germany) Michael Schumacher	2004	5473	3357	61.34%
8	(Italy) Alberto Ascari	1952	3849	2352	61.11%
9	(United Kingdom) **Lewis Hamilton**	2020	5229	3161	60.45%
10	(Germany) Michael Schumacher	1994	4834	2831	58.56%

=== Most races without leading a lap ===
	Driver	Entries	Starts
1	(Denmark) Kevin Magnussen	187	185
2	(United Kingdom) Martin Brundle	165	158
3	(United States) Eddie Cheever	143	132
4	(Russia) Daniil Kvyat	112	110
5	(France) Philippe Alliot	116	109
6	(Netherlands) Jos Verstappen	107	106
7	(Spain) Pedro de la Rosa	107	104
8	(Brazil) Pedro Diniz	99	98
9	(Sweden) Marcus Ericsson	97	97
10	(Japan) Ukyo Katayama	97	95

=== Most laps led without a win ===
	Driver	Laps
1	(New Zealand) Chris Amon	183
2	(France) Jean Behra	107
3	(France) Jean-Pierre Jarier	79
4	(United States) Jack McGrath	70
5	(United States) Johnny Thomson	55
6	(Italy) Ivan Capelli	46
6	(United States) Pat O'Connor	46
8	(Germany) **Nico Hülkenberg**	43
9	(France) Romain Grosjean	40
10	(Argentina) Carlos Menditeguy	39

== Multiple achievements at the same race ==
=== Wins from pole position ===
This is sometimes referred to as a "double".

	Driver	Races
1	(United Kingdom) **Lewis Hamilton**	61
2	(Germany) Michael Schumacher	40
2	(Netherlands) **Max Verstappen**	40
4	(Germany) Sebastian Vettel	31
5	(Brazil) Ayrton Senna	29
6	(France) Alain Prost	18
7	(United Kingdom) Nigel Mansell	17
8	(Argentina) Juan Manuel Fangio	15
8	(United Kingdom) Jim Clark	15
8	(Germany) Nico Rosberg	15

=== Most wins from pole position in a season ===
	Driver	Season	Races	Wins from pole
1	(Netherlands) **Max Verstappen**	2023	22	12
2	(United Kingdom) Nigel Mansell	1992	16	9
2	(Germany) Sebastian Vettel	2011	19	9
4	(Germany) Michael Schumacher	2004	18	8
4	(Germany) Sebastian Vettel	2013	19	8
4	(United Kingdom) **Lewis Hamilton**	2017	20	8
4	(United Kingdom) **Lewis Hamilton**	2020	17	8
8	(Brazil) Ayrton Senna	1988	16	7
8	(Brazil) Ayrton Senna	1991	16	7
8	(United Kingdom) **Lewis Hamilton**	2015	19	7
8	(United Kingdom) **Lewis Hamilton**	2016	21	7
8	(United Kingdom) **Lewis Hamilton**	2018	21	7
8	(Netherlands) **Max Verstappen**	2021	22	7

=== Pole, win, and fastest lap in same race ===
This is sometimes referred to as a "hat-trick" or "hat trick".

	Driver	Races
1	(Germany) Michael Schumacher	22
2	(United Kingdom) **Lewis Hamilton**	19
3	(Netherlands) **Max Verstappen**	15
4	(United Kingdom) Jim Clark	11
5	(Argentina) Juan Manuel Fangio	9
6	(France) Alain Prost	8
6	(Germany) Sebastian Vettel	8
8	(Italy) Alberto Ascari	7
8	(Brazil) Ayrton Senna	7
10	(United Kingdom) Nigel Mansell	5
10	(United Kingdom) Damon Hill	5
10	(Finland) Mika Häkkinen	5
10	(Spain) **Fernando Alonso**	5

=== Pole, win, fastest lap, and led every lap ===
This is sometimes referred to as a Grand Slam or a grand chelem.

	Driver	Total	Races
1	(United Kingdom) Jim Clark	8	1962 British Grand Prix; 1963 Dutch Grand Prix; 1963 French Grand Prix; 1963 Mexican Grand Prix; 1964 British Grand Prix; 1965 South African Grand Prix; 1965 French Grand Prix; 1965 German Grand Prix
2	(United Kingdom) **Lewis Hamilton**	6	2014 Malaysian Grand Prix; 2015 Italian Grand Prix; 2017 Chinese Grand Prix; 2017 Canadian Grand Prix; 2017 British Grand Prix; 2019 Abu Dhabi Grand Prix
2	(Netherlands) **Max Verstappen**	6	2021 Austrian Grand Prix; 2022 Emilia Romagna Grand Prix; 2023 Spanish Grand Prix; 2023 Qatar Grand Prix; 2024 Bahrain Grand Prix; 2025 Azerbaijan Grand Prix
4	(Italy) Alberto Ascari	5	1952 French Grand Prix; 1952 German Grand Prix; 1952 Dutch Grand Prix; 1953 Argentine Grand Prix; 1953 British Grand Prix
4	(Germany) Michael Schumacher	5	1994 Monaco Grand Prix; 1994 Canadian Grand Prix; 2002 Spanish Grand Prix; 2004 Australian Grand Prix; 2004 Hungarian Grand Prix
6	(United Kingdom) Jackie Stewart	4	1969 French Grand Prix; 1971 Monaco Grand Prix; 1971 French Grand Prix; 1972 United States Grand Prix
6	(Brazil) Ayrton Senna	4	1985 Portuguese Grand Prix; 1989 Spanish Grand Prix; 1990 Monaco Grand Prix; 1990 Italian Grand Prix
6	(United Kingdom) Nigel Mansell	4	1991 British Grand Prix; 1992 South African Grand Prix; 1992 Spanish Grand Prix; 1992 British Grand Prix
6	(Germany) Sebastian Vettel	4	2011 Indian Grand Prix; 2012 Japanese Grand Prix; 2013 Singapore Grand Prix; 2013 Korean Grand Prix
10	(Brazil) Nelson Piquet	3	1980 United States Grand Prix West; 1981 Argentine Grand Prix; 1984 Canadian Grand Prix

== Championships ==
=== Total World Drivers' Championships ===
	Driver	Titles	Seasons
1	(Germany) Michael Schumacher	7	1994, 1995, 2000, 2001, 2002, 2003, 2004
1	(United Kingdom) **Lewis Hamilton**	7	2008, 2014, 2015, 2017, 2018, 2019, 2020
3	(Argentina) Juan Manuel Fangio	5	1951, 1954, 1955, 1956, 1957
4	(France) Alain Prost	4	1985, 1986, 1989, 1993
4	(Germany) Sebastian Vettel	4	2010, 2011, 2012, 2013
4	(Netherlands) **Max Verstappen**	4	2021, 2022, 2023, 2024
7	(Australia) Jack Brabham	3	1959, 1960, 1966
7	(United Kingdom) Jackie Stewart	3	1969, 1971, 1973
7	(Austria) Niki Lauda	3	1975, 1977, 1984
7	(Brazil) Nelson Piquet	3	1981, 1983, 1987
7	(Brazil) Ayrton Senna	3	1988, 1990, 1991

=== Total World Constructors' Championships ===
	Driver	Titles	Constructor	Season(s)
1	(United Kingdom) **Lewis Hamilton**	8	Mercedes	2014, 2015, 2016, 2017, 2018, 2019, 2020, 2021
2	(Germany) Michael Schumacher	7	Benetton	1995
2	(Germany) Michael Schumacher	7	Ferrari	1999, 2000, 2001, 2002, 2003, 2004
3	(Brazil) Rubens Barrichello	6	Ferrari	2000, 2001, 2002, 2003, 2004
3	(Brazil) Rubens Barrichello	6	Brawn	2009
4	(Austria) Niki Lauda	5	Ferrari	1975, 1976, 1977
4	(Austria) Niki Lauda	5	McLaren	1984, 1985
4	(France) Alain Prost	5	McLaren	1984, 1985, 1988, 1989
4	(France) Alain Prost	5	Williams	1993
4	(Finland) **Valtteri Bottas**	5	Mercedes	2017, 2018, 2019, 2020, 2021
7	(Australia) Jack Brabham	4	Cooper	1959, 1960
7	(Australia) Jack Brabham	4	Brabham	1966, 1967
7	(Brazil) Emerson Fittipaldi	4	Lotus	1970, 1972, 1973
7	(Brazil) Emerson Fittipaldi	4	McLaren	1974
7	(Brazil) Ayrton Senna	4	McLaren	1988, 1989, 1990, 1991
7	(United Kingdom) Nigel Mansell	4	Williams	1986, 1987, 1992, 1994
7	(Australia) Mark Webber	4	Red Bull	2010, 2011, 2012, 2013
7	(Germany) Sebastian Vettel	4	Red Bull	2010, 2011, 2012, 2013

=== Multiple World Drivers' Championships with a single constructor ===
	Driver	Constructor	Titles	Seasons
1	(United Kingdom) **Lewis Hamilton**	Mercedes	6	2014, 2015, 2017, 2018, 2019, 2020
2	(Germany) Michael Schumacher	Ferrari	5	2000, 2001, 2002, 2003, 2004
3	(Germany) Sebastian Vettel	Red Bull	4	2010, 2011, 2012, 2013
3	(Netherlands) **Max Verstappen**	Red Bull	4	2021, 2022, 2023, 2024
5	(France) Alain Prost	McLaren	3	1985, 1986, 1989
5	(Brazil) Ayrton Senna	McLaren	3	1988, 1990, 1991
7	(Italy) Alberto Ascari	Ferrari	2	1952, 1953
7	(Argentina) Juan Manuel Fangio	Mercedes	2	1954, 1955
7	(Australia) Jack Brabham	Cooper	2	1959, 1960
7	(United Kingdom) Jim Clark	Lotus	2	1963, 1965
7	(United Kingdom) Jackie Stewart	Tyrrell	2	1971, 1973
7	(Austria) Niki Lauda	Ferrari	2	1975, 1977
7	(Brazil) Nelson Piquet	Brabham	2	1981, 1983
7	(Germany) Michael Schumacher	Benetton	2	1994, 1995
7	(Finland) Mika Häkkinen	McLaren	2	1998, 1999
7	(Spain) **Fernando Alonso**	Renault	2	2005, 2006

=== Most consecutive World Drivers' Championships ===
	Driver	Titles	Seasons
1	(Germany) Michael Schumacher	5	2000, 2001, 2002, 2003, 2004
2	(Argentina) Juan Manuel Fangio	4	1954, 1955, 1956, 1957
2	(Germany) Sebastian Vettel	4	2010, 2011, 2012, 2013
2	(United Kingdom) **Lewis Hamilton**	4	2017, 2018, 2019, 2020
2	(Netherlands) **Max Verstappen**	4	2021, 2022, 2023, 2024
6	(Italy) Alberto Ascari	2	1952, 1953
6	(Australia) Jack Brabham	2	1959, 1960
6	(France) Alain Prost	2	1985, 1986
6	(Brazil) Ayrton Senna	2	1990, 1991
6	(Germany) Michael Schumacher	2	1994, 1995
6	(Finland) Mika Häkkinen	2	1998, 1999
6	(Spain) **Fernando Alonso**	2	2005, 2006
6	(United Kingdom) **Lewis Hamilton**	2	2014, 2015

=== Fewest World Championship seasons before first World Drivers' Championship ===
(Excluding drivers who competed from the very first championship season of 1950; including winning season)

	Driver	Seasons (Note: This includes partial seasons.)	First championship	Debut year
1	(Canada) Jacques Villeneuve	2	1997	1996
1	(United Kingdom) **Lewis Hamilton**	2	2008	2007
1	(Italy) **Kimi Antonelli**	2	2026	2025
4	(New Zealand) Denny Hulme	3	1967	1965
4	(Brazil) Emerson Fittipaldi	3	1972	1970
6	(United States) Phil Hill	4	1961	1958
6	(United Kingdom) Jim Clark	4	1963	1960
6	(United Kingdom) James Hunt	4	1976	1973
6	(Brazil) Nelson Piquet	4	1981	1978
6	(Germany) Michael Schumacher	4	1994	1991
6	(Spain) **Fernando Alonso**	4	2005	2001 (Note: Alonso did not compete in the 2002 World Championship as he spent the season as Renault's test driver, so he won the World Championship in the fourth season he contested.)
6	(Germany) Sebastian Vettel	4	2010	2007

=== Most World Championship seasons before first World Drivers' Championship ===
	Driver	Seasons	First championship	Debut year
1	(United Kingdom) Nigel Mansell	13	1992	1980
2	(Germany) Nico Rosberg	11	2016	2006
3	(United States) Mario Andretti	10	1978	1968 (Note: Andretti did not compete in the 1973 World Championship, so he won the World Championship in the tenth season he contested.)
3	(United Kingdom) Jenson Button	10	2009	2000
5	(South Africa) Jody Scheckter	8	1979	1972
5	(Finland) Mika Häkkinen	8	1998	1991
7	(United Kingdom) Mike Hawthorn	7	1958	1952
7	(Austria) Jochen Rindt	7	1970	1964
7	(Finland) Kimi Räikkönen	7	2007	2001
7	(Netherlands) **Max Verstappen**	7	2021	2015
7	(United Kingdom) **Lando Norris**	7	2025	2019

=== Largest gap between World Drivers' Championships ===
	Driver	Seasons	Years	
1	(Austria) Niki Lauda	6	1977	1984
2	(Australia) Jack Brabham	5	1960	1966
2	(United Kingdom) Graham Hill	5	1962	1968
2	(United Kingdom) **Lewis Hamilton**	5	2008	2014
5	(Germany) Michael Schumacher	4	1995	2000
6	(Brazil) Nelson Piquet	3	1983	1987
6	(France) Alain Prost	3	1989	1993
8	(Argentina) Juan Manuel Fangio	2	1951	1954
8	(France) Alain Prost	2	1986	1989

=== Youngest World Drivers' Championship - first-time winners ===
(At the moment they clinched their first/only title)

	Driver	Age	Year
1	(Italy) **Kimi Antonelli**	20 years, 68 days	2026
2	(Germany) Sebastian Vettel	23 years, 134 days	2010
3	(United Kingdom) **Lewis Hamilton**	23 years, 300 days	2008
4	(Spain) **Fernando Alonso**	24 years, 59 days	2005
5	(Netherlands) **Max Verstappen**	24 years, 73 days	2021
6	(Brazil) Emerson Fittipaldi	25 years, 303 days	1972
7	(Germany) Michael Schumacher	25 years, 314 days	1994
8	(United Kingdom) **Lando Norris**	26 years, 24 days	2025
9	(Austria) Niki Lauda	26 years, 197 days	1975
10	(Canada) Jacques Villeneuve	26 years, 200 days	1997

=== Youngest World Drivers' Championship winners ===
(At the moment they clinched the title)

	Driver	Age	Year
1	(Italy) **Kimi Antonelli**	20 years, 68 days	2026
2	(Germany) Sebastian Vettel	23 years, 134 days	2010
3	(United Kingdom) **Lewis Hamilton**	23 years, 300 days	2008
4	(Spain) **Fernando Alonso**	24 years, 59 days	2005
5	(Netherlands) **Max Verstappen**	24 years, 73 days	2021
6	(Germany) Sebastian Vettel	24 years, 99 days	2011
7	(Netherlands) **Max Verstappen**	25 years, 9 days	2022
8	(Spain) **Fernando Alonso**	25 years, 85 days	2006
9	(Germany) Sebastian Vettel	25 years, 146 days	2012
10	(Brazil) Emerson Fittipaldi	25 years, 303 days	1972

=== Oldest World Drivers' Championship - last time winners ===
(At the moment they clinched their latest/only title)

	Driver	Age	Year
1	(Argentina) Juan Manuel Fangio	46 years, 41 days	1957
2	(Italy) Giuseppe Farina	43 years, 308 days	1950
3	(Australia) Jack Brabham	40 years, 155 days	1966
4	(United Kingdom) Graham Hill	39 years, 262 days	1968
5	(United Kingdom) Nigel Mansell	39 years, 8 days	1992
6	(France) Alain Prost	38 years, 214 days	1993
7	(United States) Mario Andretti	38 years, 194 days	1978
8	(United Kingdom) Damon Hill	36 years, 26 days	1996
9	(United Kingdom) **Lewis Hamilton**	35 years, 313 days	2020
10	(Austria) Niki Lauda	35 years, 242 days	1984

== Sprints ==
Sprint races were introduced in 2021 as an addition to select races; since 2022, points have been awarded to the top eight finishers.

=== Most sprint wins ===
	Driver	Starts	Wins	Percentage
1	(Netherlands) **Max Verstappen**	30	14	46.67%
2	(United Kingdom) **Lando Norris**	30	4	13.33%
2	(United Kingdom) **George Russell**	30	4	13.33%
4	(Australia) **Oscar Piastri**	24	3	12.50%
5	(Finland) **Valtteri Bottas**	24	2	8.33%
6	(Mexico) **Sergio Pérez**	24	1	4.17%
6	(United Kingdom) **Lewis Hamilton**	30	1	3.33%
6	(Italy) **Kimi Antonelli**	12	1	8.33%

=== Most sprint pole positions ===
	Driver	Entries	Poles	Percentage
1	(Netherlands) **Max Verstappen**	30	11	36.67%
2	(United Kingdom) **Lando Norris**	30	5	16.67%
3	(Australia) **Oscar Piastri**	24	4	16.67%
4	(United Kingdom) **Lewis Hamilton**	30	3	10.00%
4	(United Kingdom) **George Russell**	30	3	10.00%
6	(Finland) **Valtteri Bottas**	24	1	4.17%
6	(Denmark) Kevin Magnussen	15	1	6.67%
6	(Monaco) **Charles Leclerc**	30	1	3.33%
6	(Italy) **Kimi Antonelli**	12	1	8.33%

=== Most sprint fastest laps ===
	Driver	Starts	Fastest laps	Percentage
1	(Netherlands) **Max Verstappen**	30	9	30.00%
2	(United Kingdom) **Lando Norris**	30	5	16.67%
3	(United Kingdom) **Lewis Hamilton**	30	4	13.33%
4	(Mexico) **Sergio Pérez**	24	3	12.50%
4	(Monaco) **Charles Leclerc**	30	3	10.00%
6	(United Kingdom) **George Russell**	30	2	6.67%
6	(Italy) **Kimi Antonelli**	12	2	16.67%
8	(Germany) **Nico Hülkenberg**	23	1	4.35%
8	(France) **Pierre Gasly**	30	1	3.33%

=== Most sprint podium finishes ===
	Driver	Starts	Podiums	Percentage
1	(Netherlands) **Max Verstappen**	30	19	63.33%
2	(United Kingdom) **Lando Norris**	30	14	46.67%
3	(Australia) **Oscar Piastri**	24	10	41.67%
3	(Monaco) **Charles Leclerc**	30	10	33.33%
5	(United Kingdom) **Lewis Hamilton**	30	9	30.00%
6	(United Kingdom) **George Russell**	30	8	26.67%
7	(Mexico) **Sergio Pérez**	24	6	25.00%
7	(Spain) **Carlos Sainz Jr.**	30	6	20.00%
9	(Finland) **Valtteri Bottas**	24	3	12.50%
9	(Italy) **Kimi Antonelli**	12	3	25.00%

=== Most points scored in sprints ===
	Driver	Starts	Points	Average
1	(Netherlands) **Max Verstappen**	30	163	5.43
2	(United Kingdom) **Lando Norris**	30	119	3.97
3	(Monaco) **Charles Leclerc**	30	118	3.93
4	(United Kingdom) **George Russell**	30	114	3.80
5	(Australia) **Oscar Piastri**	24	92	3.83
6	(United Kingdom) **Lewis Hamilton**	30	90	3.00
7	(Spain) **Carlos Sainz Jr.**	30	79	2.63
8	(Mexico) **Sergio Pérez**	24	53	2.21
9	(Italy) **Kimi Antonelli**	12	46	3.83
10	(Japan) **Yuki Tsunoda**	25	16	0.64

=== Total sprint laps led ===
	Driver	Laps
1	(Netherlands) **Max Verstappen**	253
2	(United Kingdom) **George Russell**	83
3	(United Kingdom) **Lando Norris**	70
4	(Australia) **Oscar Piastri**	66
5	(Finland) **Valtteri Bottas**	42
6	(United Kingdom) **Lewis Hamilton**	36
7	(Monaco) **Charles Leclerc**	26
8	(Italy) **Kimi Antonelli**	12
9	(Mexico) **Sergio Pérez**	10
10	(Denmark) Kevin Magnussen	2

=== Total sprint distance led ===
	Driver	Distance (km)
1	(Netherlands) **Max Verstappen**	1290
2	(United Kingdom) **George Russell**	386
3	(United Kingdom) **Lando Norris**	349
4	(Australia) **Oscar Piastri**	340
5	(Finland) **Valtteri Bottas**	207
6	(United Kingdom) **Lewis Hamilton**	199
7	(Monaco) **Charles Leclerc**	135
8	(Italy) **Kimi Antonelli**	70
9	(Mexico) **Sergio Pérez**	60
10	(Denmark) Kevin Magnussen	9

== Other driver records ==
=== Race starts and entries, other ===
Description	Record	Details	Ref.
Longest time between first and last starts	25 years, 263 days	(Spain) **Fernando Alonso** (2001 Australian Grand Prix – 2026 Las Vegas Grand Prix) (ongoing)	
Longest time between successive starts	10 years, 114 days	(Netherlands) Jan Lammers (1982 Dutch Grand Prix – 1992 Japanese Grand Prix)	
Most races between successive starts	167	(Italy) Luca Badoer (1999 Japanese Grand Prix – 2009 European Grand Prix)	
Most seasons with a start	23	(Spain) **Fernando Alonso** (2001, 2003–2018, 2021–2026)	
Most races not started	40	(Italy) Gabriele Tarquini	
Most consecutive starts without scoring points	53	(Finland) Heikki Kovalainen (2010 Monaco Grand Prix – 2012 Brazilian Grand Prix)	

=== Wins, other ===
Description	Record	Details	Ref.
Most wins with different constructors	5	(United Kingdom) Stirling Moss (Mercedes, Maserati, Vanwall, Cooper, Lotus)	
Most driver wins during seasons without a Constructors' Championship	41	(Netherlands) **Max Verstappen**	
Most wins in a season without winning the Drivers' Championship	10	(United Kingdom) **Lewis Hamilton** (2016)	
Most wins at different Grands Prix	32	(United Kingdom) **Lewis Hamilton**	
Most wins at different circuits	31	(United Kingdom) **Lewis Hamilton**	
Most wins at the same circuit	9	(United Kingdom) **Lewis Hamilton** (Silverstone)	
Most wins at a driver's national Grand Prix	9	(United Kingdom) **Lewis Hamilton**	
Most wins in a driver's home country	9	(Germany) Michael Schumacher (United Kingdom) **Lewis Hamilton**	
Most wins in the same country	12	(Germany) Michael Schumacher (5 Italian Grand Prix and 7 San Marino Grand Prix)	
Most seasons with a win	17	(United Kingdom) **Lewis Hamilton**	
Longest time between first and last wins	19 years, 4 days	(United Kingdom) **Lewis Hamilton** (2007 Canadian Grand Prix – 2026 Barcelona-Catalunya Grand Prix)	
Longest time between successive wins	6 years, 210 days	(Italy) Riccardo Patrese (1983 South African Grand Prix – 1990 San Marino Grand Prix)	
Most races between successive wins	114	(Finland) Kimi Räikkönen (2013 Australian Grand Prix – 2018 United States Grand Prix)	
Most race winners in a season	11 (1982)	(France) Alain Prost (Austria) Niki Lauda (France) Didier Pironi (United Kingdom) John Watson (Italy) Riccardo Patrese (Brazil) Nelson Piquet (France) René Arnoux (France) Patrick Tambay (Italy) Elio de Angelis (Finland) Keke Rosberg (Italy) Michele Alboreto	
Most multiple race winners in a season	7 (2024)	(Netherlands) **Max Verstappen** – 9 wins (United Kingdom) **Lando Norris** – 4 wins (Monaco) **Charles Leclerc** – 3 wins (United Kingdom) **Lewis Hamilton** – 2 wins (Australia) **Oscar Piastri** – 2 wins (Spain) **Carlos Sainz Jr.** – 2 wins (United Kingdom) **George Russell** – 2 wins	
Fewest race winners in a season	3	(Italy) Giuseppe Farina, (Argentina) Juan Manuel Fangio, (United States) Johnnie Parsons (1950) (Italy) Piero Taruffi, (United States) Troy Ruttman, (Italy) Alberto Ascari (1952) (United Kingdom) Jim Clark, (United Kingdom) Graham Hill, (United Kingdom) John Surtees (1963) (Brazil) Ayrton Senna, (France) Alain Prost, (Austria) Gerhard Berger (1988) (United Kingdom) **Lewis Hamilton**, (Germany) Nico Rosberg, (Australia) Daniel Ricciardo (2014) (United Kingdom) **Lewis Hamilton**, (Germany) Nico Rosberg, (Germany) Sebastian Vettel (2015) (Netherlands) **Max Verstappen**, (Mexico) **Sergio Pérez**, (Spain) **Carlos Sainz Jr.** (2023)	
Most different race winners in consecutive races	9 (1961–1962) (1982)	(Italy) Giancarlo Baghetti (1961 French Grand Prix) (Germany) Wolfgang von Trips (1961 British Grand Prix) (United Kingdom) Stirling Moss (1961 German Grand Prix); Phil Hill (1961 Italian Grand Prix) (United Kingdom) Innes Ireland (1961 United States Grand Prix) (United Kingdom) Graham Hill (1962 Dutch Grand Prix) (New Zealand) Bruce McLaren (1962 Monaco Grand Prix) (United Kingdom) Jim Clark (1962 Belgian Grand Prix); Dan Gurney (1962 French Grand Prix) (Italy) Riccardo Patrese (1982 Monaco Grand Prix) (United Kingdom) John Watson (1982 Detroit Grand Prix) (Brazil) Nelson Piquet (1982 Canadian Grand Prix) (France) Didier Pironi (1982 Dutch Grand Prix) (Austria) Niki Lauda (1982 British Grand Prix) (France) René Arnoux (1982 French Grand Prix) (France) Patrick Tambay (1982 German Grand Prix) (Italy) Elio de Angelis (1982 Austrian Grand Prix) (Finland) Keke Rosberg (1982 Swiss Grand Prix)	
Most different race winners in consecutive races (starting from first race of the season)	7 (2012)	(United Kingdom) Jenson Button (2012 Australian Grand Prix) (Spain) **Fernando Alonso** (2012 Malaysian Grand Prix) (Germany) Nico Rosberg (2012 Chinese Grand Prix) (Germany) Sebastian Vettel (2012 Bahrain Grand Prix) (Venezuela) Pastor Maldonado (2012 Spanish Grand Prix) (Australia) Mark Webber (2012 Monaco Grand Prix) (United Kingdom) **Lewis Hamilton** (2012 Canadian Grand Prix)	
Most wins at different circuits from first win without repeating	11	(United Kingdom) **Lando Norris**	
Fewest wins in a World Championship-winning season	1	(United Kingdom) Mike Hawthorn (1958) (Finland) Keke Rosberg (1982)	
Most wins before first pole position	7	(United Kingdom) Jackie Stewart (Netherlands) **Max Verstappen**	
Most wins without a pole position	4	(New Zealand) Bruce McLaren (United Kingdom) Eddie Irvine	
Most wins without a win from pole position	8	(New Zealand) Denny Hulme (Note: All of Hulme's eight career wins were not from pole position.)	
Largest gap between first and second place in a race	5 min, 12.75 sec	(United Kingdom) Stirling Moss and (United Kingdom) Mike Hawthorn (1958 Portuguese Grand Prix)	
Smallest gap between first and second place in a race	0.011 sec	(Brazil) Rubens Barrichello and (Germany) Michael Schumacher (2002 United States Grand Prix)	
Most wins not starting from pole position	51	(Germany) Michael Schumacher	
Most wins not starting from pole position in a season	9	(Netherlands) **Max Verstappen** (2022)	
Most consecutive wins from pole position	18	(Netherlands) **Max Verstappen** (2022 Dutch Grand Prix – 2024 Saudi Arabian Grand Prix)	
Wins from most different grid slots	11	(Netherlands) **Max Verstappen** (starting positions: 1st, 2nd, 3rd, 4th, 5th, 6th, 7th, 9th, 10th, 14th, 17th)	
Wins from most different grid slots in a season	7 (2022)	(Netherlands) **Max Verstappen** (starting positions: 1st, 2nd, 3rd, 4th, 7th, 10th, 14th)	
Most wins in one country in a season	3 (2023)	(Netherlands) **Max Verstappen** (2023 Miami Grand Prix, 2023 United States Grand Prix, 2023 Las Vegas Grand Prix)	
Most consecutive wins starting from first career win	5	(Italy) **Kimi Antonelli** (2026 Chinese Grand Prix – 2026 Monaco Grand Prix)	

=== Pole positions, other ===
Description	Record	Details	Ref.
Pole positions with most different constructors	5	(United Kingdom) Stirling Moss (Mercedes, Maserati, Vanwall, Cooper, Lotus)	
Most pole positions at different Grands Prix	31	(United Kingdom) **Lewis Hamilton**	
Most pole positions at different circuits	32	(United Kingdom) **Lewis Hamilton**	
Most pole positions at the same circuit	9	(United Kingdom) **Lewis Hamilton** (Hungaroring)	
Most pole positions at a driver's national Grand Prix	7	(United Kingdom) **Lewis Hamilton**	
Most seasons with a pole position	17	(United Kingdom) **Lewis Hamilton**	
Longest time between first and last pole positions	19 years, 144 days	(United Kingdom) **Lewis Hamilton** (2007 Canadian Grand Prix – 2026 Mexico City Grand Prix)	
Longest time between successive pole positions	8 years, 341 days	(Finland) Kimi Räikkönen (2008 French Grand Prix – 2017 Monaco Grand Prix)	
Most races between successive pole positions	168	(Finland) Kimi Räikkönen (2008 French Grand Prix – 2017 Monaco Grand Prix)	
Most polesitters in a season	9 (2005)	(Spain) **Fernando Alonso** (United Kingdom) Jenson Button (Italy) Giancarlo Fisichella (Germany) Nick Heidfeld (Colombia) Juan Pablo Montoya (Finland) Kimi Räikkönen (Germany) Michael Schumacher (Germany) Ralf Schumacher (Italy) Jarno Trulli	
Fewest pole positions with a World Championship	0	(New Zealand) Denny Hulme (1967) (Note: Hulme won the 1967 World Championship without ever having scored a pole, although six years later, in 1973, Hulme racked up the solitary pole of his 112-race career.) (Austria) Niki Lauda (1984)	
Most pole positions in first championship season	6	(United Kingdom) **Lewis Hamilton** (2007)	
Smallest gap between first and second place in qualifying	0.000 sec	(Canada) Jacques Villeneuve and (Germany) Michael Schumacher (1997 European Grand Prix) (Note: The gap to third place in this qualifying was also 0.000s and was set by Heinz-Harald Frentzen.) (United Kingdom) **George Russell** and (Netherlands) **Max Verstappen** (2024 Canadian Grand Prix)	
Most pole positions without leading a lap	3	(Italy) Teo Fabi	
Most pole positions without a win	5	(New Zealand) Chris Amon	
Most pole positions before winning a World Championship	30	(Germany) Nico Rosberg	

=== Fastest laps, other ===
Description	Record	Details	Ref.
Fastest laps with most different constructors	6	(United Kingdom) Stirling Moss (Mercedes, Maserati, Vanwall, Cooper, Lotus, BRM)	
Most fastest laps at different Grands Prix	28	(United Kingdom) **Lewis Hamilton**	
Most fastest laps at different circuits	27	(United Kingdom) **Lewis Hamilton**	
Most fastest laps at the same circuit	7	(Germany) Michael Schumacher (Barcelona) (United Kingdom) **Lewis Hamilton** (Monza )	
Most fastest laps at a driver's national Grand Prix	7	(United Kingdom) Nigel Mansell	
Most seasons with a fastest lap	19	(United Kingdom) **Lewis Hamilton**	
Longest time between first and last fastest lap	21 years, 15 days	(Spain) **Fernando Alonso** (2003 Canadian Grand Prix – 2024 Austrian Grand Prix)	
Longest time between successive fastest laps	7 years, 347 days	(Italy) Giancarlo Fisichella (1997 Spanish Grand Prix – 2005 Spanish Grand Prix)	
Most races between successive fastest laps	132	(Italy) Giancarlo Fisichella (1997 Spanish Grand Prix – 2005 Spanish Grand Prix)	
Most wins with fastest lap	48	(Germany) Michael Schumacher	

=== Podium finishes, other ===
Description	Record	Details	Ref.
Podium finishes with most different constructors	6	(United Kingdom) Stirling Moss (Mercedes, Maserati, Vanwall, Cooper, Lotus, BRM)	
Podiums at most different Grands Prix	38	(United Kingdom) **Lewis Hamilton**	
Podiums at most different circuits	36	(United Kingdom) **Lewis Hamilton**	
Most podiums at the same circuit	16	(United Kingdom) **Lewis Hamilton** (Silverstone)	
Most podium finishes at a driver's national Grand Prix	15	(United Kingdom) **Lewis Hamilton**	
Longest time between first and last podium finishes	20 years, 228 days	(Spain) **Fernando Alonso** (2003 Malaysian Grand Prix – 2023 São Paulo Grand Prix)	
Longest time between successive podium finishes	7 years, 285 days	(Austria) Alexander Wurz (1997 British Grand Prix – 2005 San Marino Grand Prix)	
Most races between successive podium finishes	105	(Spain) **Fernando Alonso** (2014 Hungarian Grand Prix – 2021 Qatar Grand Prix)	
Most consecutive podium finishes from start of career	9	(United Kingdom) **Lewis Hamilton** (2007 Australian Grand Prix – 2007 British Grand Prix)	
Most podiums in a first championship season	12	(United Kingdom) **Lewis Hamilton**	
Most seasons with a podium finish	19	(United Kingdom) **Lewis Hamilton**	
Most podium finishers in a season	18 (1982)	(France) Alain Prost (Argentina) Carlos Reutemann (France) René Arnoux (United Kingdom) John Watson (United Kingdom) Nigel Mansell (Austria) Niki Lauda (Finland) Keke Rosberg (Italy) Riccardo Patrese (France) Didier Pironi (Canada) Gilles Villeneuve (Italy) Michele Alboreto (United States) Eddie Cheever (Italy) Andrea de Cesaris (Brazil) Nelson Piquet (France) Patrick Tambay (Italy) Elio de Angelis (France) Jacques Laffite (United States) Mario Andretti	
Most podiums not starting from front row	72	(Finland) Kimi Räikkönen (Spain) **Fernando Alonso**	
Most second places	60	(United Kingdom) **Lewis Hamilton**	
Most third places	45	(Finland) Kimi Räikkönen	
Most podiums by the same duo	63	(United Kingdom) **Lewis Hamilton** and (Netherlands) **Max Verstappen**	
Most podiums by the same trio	20	(Finland) **Valtteri Bottas**, (United Kingdom) **Lewis Hamilton** and (Netherlands) **Max Verstappen**	
Most identical podium	8	1st: (United Kingdom) **Lewis Hamilton**, 2nd: (Germany) Nico Rosberg, 3rd: (Germany) Sebastian Vettel	
Most 1st and 2nd place podiums by the same duo	38	(United Kingdom) **Lewis Hamilton** and (Netherlands) **Max Verstappen**	
Most consecutive top two finishes	15	(Germany) Michael Schumacher (2002 Brazilian Grand Prix – 2002 Japanese Grand Prix) (Netherlands) **Max Verstappen** (2022 Abu Dhabi Grand Prix – 2023 Italian Grand Prix)	
Podiums from most different grid slots	18	(Netherlands) **Max Verstappen** (1st, 2nd, 3rd, 4th, 5th, 6th, 7th, 8th, 9th, 10th, 14th, 15th, 16th, 17th, 18th, 20th, 21st, pit-lane)	

=== Points, other ===
Description	Record	Details	Ref.
Points finishes with most different constructors	9	(Italy) Andrea de Cesaris (McLaren, Alfa Romeo, Ligier, Brabham, Rial, Dallara, Jordan, Tyrrell, Sauber)	
Longest time between first and last points finishes	23 years, 209 days	(Spain) **Fernando Alonso** (2003 Australian Grand Prix – 2026 Bahrain Grand Prix)	
Longest time between successive points finishes	8 years, 256 days	(Poland) Robert Kubica (2010 Abu Dhabi Grand Prix – 2019 German Grand Prix)	
Most races between successive points finishes	168	(Poland) Robert Kubica (2010 Abu Dhabi Grand Prix – 2019 German Grand Prix)	
Most seasons with points finishes	22	(Spain) **Fernando Alonso**	
Most points without a podium	125	(Japan) **Yuki Tsunoda**	
Most laps completed without scoring a point	2364	(Italy) Luca Badoer	
Most points in first championship season	150	(Italy) **Kimi Antonelli** (2025)	

=== Race finishes, other ===
Description	Record	Details	Ref.
Worst finishing position in a race	24th	(India) Narain Karthikeyan (2011 European Grand Prix)	
Highest percentage of race finishes in a season	100%	(United States) Dan Gurney (1961) (United Kingdom) Graham Hill (1962) (United Kingdom) Jim Clark (1963) (United States) Richie Ginther (1964) (Germany) Michael Schumacher (2002) (Germany) Nick Heidfeld (2008) (Finland) Kimi Räikkönen (2012) (United Kingdom) Max Chilton (2013) (Australia) Daniel Ricciardo (2016) (United Kingdom) **Lewis Hamilton** (2017, 2019) (Netherlands) **Max Verstappen** (2023) (Australia) **Oscar Piastri** (2024) (United Kingdom) **George Russell** (2025)	
Most classified finishes	367	(Spain) **Fernando Alonso** (United Kingdom) **Lewis Hamilton**	
Most consecutive finishes from start of career	27	(France) **Esteban Ocon** (2016 Belgian Grand Prix – 2017 Mexican Grand Prix)	
Most consecutive retirements	18	(Italy) Andrea de Cesaris (1985 French Grand Prix – 1986 Portuguese Grand Prix) (Note: Some sources listed De Cesaris's sequence to 22 retirements, starting from the 1986 Australian Grand Prix to the 1988 Canadian Grand Prix and including the 1987 Belgian, 1987 Australian, and 1988 Canadian Grands Prix on the basis that he did not complete the races.)	
Most retirements in a season	14	(Italy) Andrea de Cesaris (1986, 1987)	
Most retirements at one circuit	12	(Italy) Andrea de Cesaris (Imola)	

=== Championships, other ===
Description	Record	Details	Ref.
Most races left in a season when becoming World Drivers' Champion	6	(Germany) Michael Schumacher (2002 in round 11 of 17) (Netherlands) **Max Verstappen** (2023 in round 17 of 22) (Note: Verstappen won the 2023 World Championship at the Qatar sprint race, before racing at the Grand Prix. Sprint races do not count to the tally of this record.)	
Most World Drivers' Championship contenders at the last race of the season	4 (2010)	(Germany) Sebastian Vettel (Spain) **Fernando Alonso** (Australia) Mark Webber (United Kingdom) **Lewis Hamilton**	
Most races as World Drivers' Championship leader	126	(United Kingdom) **Lewis Hamilton**	
Most consecutive races as World Drivers' Championship leader	63	(Netherlands) **Max Verstappen** (2022 Spanish Grand Prix – 2025 Australian Grand Prix)	
Most consecutive days as World Drivers' Championship leader	1029	(Netherlands) **Max Verstappen** (2022 Spanish Grand Prix – 2025 Australian Grand Prix)	
Largest points deficit overturned to become World Drivers' Champion	46 (2022)	(Netherlands) **Max Verstappen** and (Monaco) **Charles Leclerc**	
Most points between first and second in the World Drivers' Championship	290 (2023)	(Netherlands) **Max Verstappen** (575 pts.) and (Mexico) **Sergio Pérez** (285 pts.)	
Highest percentage margin between first and second in the World Drivers' Championship	50.43% (2023)	(Netherlands) **Max Verstappen** (575 pts.) and (Mexico) **Sergio Pérez** (285 pts.)	
Fewest points between first and second in the World Drivers' Championship	0.5 (1984)	(Austria) Niki Lauda (72 pts.) and (France) Alain Prost (71.5 pts.)	
Smallest percentage margin between first and second in the World Drivers' Championship	0.47% (2025)	(United Kingdom) **Lando Norris** (423 pts.) and (Netherlands) **Max Verstappen** (421 pts.)	
World Drivers' Championship with most different constructors	4	(Argentina) Juan Manuel Fangio (Alfa Romeo, Maserati, Mercedes, Ferrari)	
Longest time between first and last World Drivers' Championship titles	12 years, 13 days	(United Kingdom) **Lewis Hamilton** (2008 and 2020)	
Longest time between successive World Drivers' Championship titles	7 years, 19 days	(Austria) Niki Lauda (1977 and 1984)	
Most World Drivers' Championship leader changes in a season	10 (1986) (2010)	(Brazil) Nelson Piquet (Brazil) Ayrton Senna (Brazil) Nelson Piquet (France) Alain Prost (Brazil) Ayrton Senna (France) Alain Prost (Brazil) Ayrton Senna (France) Alain Prost (United Kingdom) Nigel Mansell (France) Alain Prost (Spain) **Fernando Alonso** (Brazil) Felipe Massa (United Kingdom) Jenson Button (Australia) Mark Webber (United Kingdom) **Lewis Hamilton** (Australia) Mark Webber (United Kingdom) **Lewis Hamilton** (Australia) Mark Webber (Spain) **Fernando Alonso** (Germany) Sebastian Vettel	
Most World Drivers' Championship leaders in a season	6 (2010)	(Spain) **Fernando Alonso** (Brazil) Felipe Massa (United Kingdom) Jenson Button (Australia) Mark Webber (United Kingdom) **Lewis Hamilton** (Germany) Sebastian Vettel	
Fewest World Drivers' Championship leaders in a season	1	(Italy) Alberto Ascari (1953) (Argentina) Juan Manuel Fangio (1954, 1957) (Australia) Jack Brabham (1959) (United Kingdom) Graham Hill (1962) (United Kingdom) Jackie Stewart (1969) (Brazil) Ayrton Senna (1991) (United Kingdom) Nigel Mansell (1992) (Germany) Michael Schumacher (1994, 2001, 2002, 2004) (United Kingdom) Damon Hill (1996) (Finland) Mika Häkkinen (1998) (United Kingdom) Jenson Button (2009) (Germany) Sebastian Vettel (2011) (United Kingdom) **Lewis Hamilton** (2015) (Netherlands) **Max Verstappen** (2023, 2024)	
Most World Drivers' Champions competing in a race	6 (2012 Australian Grand Prix) (Note: Every race in the 2012 season had the aforementioned six drivers compete.)	(Germany) Sebastian Vettel (United Kingdom) Jenson Button (United Kingdom) **Lewis Hamilton** (Finland) Kimi Räikkönen (Spain) **Fernando Alonso** (Germany) Michael Schumacher	
Most World Drivers' Championship runners-up	4	(United Kingdom) Stirling Moss (1955, 1956, 1957, 1958) (France) Alain Prost (1983, 1984, 1988, 1990)	
Youngest double World Drivers' Championship winner	24 years, 99 days	(Germany) Sebastian Vettel (2011)	
Youngest triple World Drivers' Championship winner	25 years, 145 days	(Germany) Sebastian Vettel (2012)	
Youngest quadruple World Drivers' Championship winner	26 years, 115 days	(Germany) Sebastian Vettel (2013)	
Youngest quintuple World Drivers' Championship winner	33 years, 201 days	(Germany) Michael Schumacher (2002)	
Youngest World Drivers' Championship leader	19 years, 216 days	(Italy) **Kimi Antonelli** (2026)	

=== Sprints, other ===
Description	Record	Details	Ref.
Most sprint wins in a season	4	(Netherlands) **Max Verstappen** (2023, 2024)	
Youngest sprint winner	19 years, 313 days	(Italy) **Kimi Antonelli** (2026 British Grand Prix)	
Youngest sprint polesitter	18 years, 250 days	(Italy) **Kimi Antonelli** (2025 Miami Grand Prix)	
Youngest driver to set a sprint fastest lap	19 years, 271 days	(Italy) **Kimi Antonelli** (2026 Canadian Grand Prix)	
Youngest driver to score a sprint podium finish	19 years, 75 days	(Italy) **Kimi Antonelli** (2025 São Paulo Grand Prix)	

=== Teammates, other ===
Description	Record	Details	Ref.
Most races	104	(Germany) Michael Schumacher and (Brazil) Rubens Barrichello (Ferrari, 2000–2005)	
Most 1–2 finishes	31	(United Kingdom) **Lewis Hamilton** and (Germany) Nico Rosberg (Mercedes, 2014–2016)	
Most grid front rows	44	(United Kingdom) **Lewis Hamilton** and (Germany) Nico Rosberg (Mercedes, 2013–2016)	
Most 1–2 finishes from front row	27	(United Kingdom) **Lewis Hamilton** and (Germany) Nico Rosberg (Mercedes, 2014–2016)	

=== Other ===
Description	Record	Details	Ref.
Most pit stops by a driver in a race	7	(France) Alain Prost (1993 European Grand Prix) (Canada) **Lance Stroll**, (New Zealand) **Liam Lawson**, (United Kingdom) **George Russell** (2023 Dutch Grand Prix) (Mexico) **Sergio Pérez** (2026 Bahrain Grand Prix)	
Most pit stops by a winning driver in a race	6	(United Kingdom) Jenson Button (2011 Canadian Grand Prix) (Note: Button was given a drive-through penalty for speeding behind the safety car.) (Netherlands) **Max Verstappen** (2023 Dutch Grand Prix)	
Most positions gained in a race	30	(United States) Jim Rathmann (1957 Indianapolis 500)	
Most consecutive Q3 appearances	103	(Finland) **Valtteri Bottas** (2017 Australian Grand Prix – 2022 Saudi Arabian Grand Prix)	
Most times being overtaken in a season	70	(France) Charles Pic (2012)	
Most driving penalties in a race	5	(France) **Esteban Ocon** (2023 Austrian Grand Prix)	
Most driving penalties in a season	10	(Venezuela) Pastor Maldonado (2014)	
Most grid place penalties in a race	80	(Brazil) **Gabriel Bortoleto** (2026 United States Grand Prix) (Note: Bortoleto received a total of 80 places for exceeding the allowed allocation of his power unit components.)	
Shortest time elapsed before earning a penalty	9 seconds	(Germany) Sebastian Vettel (2006 Turkish Grand Prix) (Note: Vettel was recorded to have sped in pit lane during his first free practice session as Formula One driver.)	
Shortest distance driven in career	2 m	(Germany) Ernst Loof (1953 German Grand Prix) (Note: Loof started one World Championship race at the 1953 German Grand Prix but only made it two metres off the starting grid. The 1952 and 1953 World Championships were run to Formula Two regulations; however, World Championship and Formula One are commonly referred to synonymously and are treated as such for these records. Marco Apicella, who raced a mere 800 metres (2,600 ft) at the 1993 Italian Grand Prix, is frequently referred to as having the shortest Formula One career but that is a technicality.)	
Youngest driver to participate in a session	17 years, 3 days	(Netherlands) **Max Verstappen** (2014 Japanese Grand Prix)	
Most laps driven in career	24,077 laps (ongoing)	(Spain) **Fernando Alonso**	
Longest distance driven in career	120,659 km (ongoing)	(Spain) **Fernando Alonso**	
Highest average speed by a winning driver in a race	250.706 km/h	(Netherlands) **Max Verstappen** (2025 Italian Grand Prix)	
Lowest average speed by a winning driver in a race	53.583 km/h	(Netherlands) **Max Verstappen** (2022 Japanese Grand Prix)	
Most hat-tricks in a season	6	(Netherlands) **Max Verstappen** (2023)	
Most consecutive seasons with a grand slam	5	(Netherlands) **Max Verstappen** (2021–2025) (ongoing)	
Most consecutive grand slams	2	(Italy) Alberto Ascari (1952 German Grand Prix, 1952 Dutch Grand Prix) (United Kingdom) Jim Clark (1963 Dutch Grand Prix, 1963 French Grand Prix and 1965 French Grand Prix, 1965 German Grand Prix) (Germany) Sebastian Vettel (2013 Singapore Grand Prix, 2013 Korean Grand Prix)	
Youngest driver to win from pole position	19 years, 202 days	(Italy) **Kimi Antonelli** (2026 Chinese Grand Prix)	
Youngest driver to score a hat-trick	19 years, 202 days	(Italy) **Kimi Antonelli** (2026 Chinese Grand Prix)	
Youngest driver to score a Grand Slam	19 years, 286 days	(Italy) **Kimi Antonelli** (2026 Monaco Grand Prix)	

== See also ==
- List of Formula One drivers
- List of Formula One World Drivers' Champions
