= 2026 Formula One World Championship =

Formula One season

Kimi Antonelli won his first World Drivers' Championship, driving for Mercedes, who won their ninth World Constructors' Championship.

The 2026 FIA Formula One World Championship is a motor racing championship for Formula One cars and the 77th running of the Formula One World Championship. It is recognised by the Fédération Internationale de l'Automobile (FIA), the governing body of international motorsport, as the highest class of competition for open-wheel racing cars. The championship is contested over twenty-three Grands Prix held around the world. It began in March and is scheduled to end in December. Drivers and teams compete for the titles of World Drivers' Champion and World Constructors' Champion, respectively. Lando Norris was the reigning World Drivers' Champion, while McLaren-Mercedes are the reigning World Constructors' Champions. The World Drivers' Championship was clinched by Mercedes driver Kimi Antonelli at the Mexico City Grand Prix. It was his maiden title in his second year competing in Formula One, becoming the youngest ever champion in Formula One history and the first Italian to win the championship since Alberto Ascari in 1953. Mercedes secured their ninth Constructors' Championship at the São Paulo Grand Prix.

The 2026 season features a major set of regulation changes with a revised power unit configuration and new active aerodynamics along with the addition of an eleventh team competing for the first time since 2016. Audi, who acquired Sauber in 2024, enter as a works team with its own power unit, while Cadillac made their debut in the championship using Ferrari power units. Honda, through its Honda Racing Corporation subsidiary, entered into an exclusive works team agreement with Aston Martin, and are supplying them with their own power unit after ending its relationship with Red Bull Racing. Ford returned to the sport for the first time since 2004, supporting Red Bull Powertrains in supplying power units to Red Bull Racing and Racing Bulls. Renault is no longer an engine supplier as Alpine switched to Mercedes power units.

Due to the 2026 Iran war, the championship schedule was modified. The Saudi Arabian Grand Prix was cancelled, and the Bahrain Grand Prix was postponed and relocated to Malaysia's Sepang International Circuit, with the circuit hosting a Formula One race for the first time since 2017.

== Entries ==
Each team is required to enter at least two drivers, one for each of the two mandatory cars. They may not field more than four drivers in a season. All teams compete with tyres supplied by Pirelli.

Teams and drivers that are contracted to compete in the 2026 World Championship
Entrant	Constructor	Chassis	Power unit	Race drivers		
Entrant	Constructor	Chassis	Power unit	No.	Driver name	Rounds
(France) BWT Alpine F1 Team	Alpine-Mercedes	A526	Mercedes-AMG F1 M17	10; 43	(France) Pierre Gasly (Argentina) Franco Colapinto	1–21; 1–21
(United Kingdom) Aston Martin Aramco F1 Team	Aston Martin Aramco-Honda	AMR26	Honda RA626H	14; 18	(Spain) Fernando Alonso (Canada) Lance Stroll	1–21; 1–21
(United Kingdom) Atlassian Williams F1 Team	Atlassian Williams-Mercedes	FW48	Mercedes-AMG F1 M17	23; 55	(Thailand) Alexander Albon (Spain) Carlos Sainz Jr.	1–21; 1–21
(Germany) Audi Revolut F1 Team	Audi	R26	Audi AFR 26 Hybrid	5; 27	(Brazil) Gabriel Bortoleto (Germany) Nico Hülkenberg	1–21; 1–21
(United States) Cadillac Formula 1 Team	Cadillac-Ferrari	MAC-26	Ferrari 067/6	11; 77	(Mexico) Sergio Pérez (Finland) Valtteri Bottas	1–21; 1–21
(Italy) Scuderia Ferrari HP	Ferrari	SF-26	Ferrari 067/6	16; 44	(Monaco) Charles Leclerc (United Kingdom) Lewis Hamilton	1–21; 1–21
(United States) TGR Haas F1 Team	Haas-Ferrari	VF-26	Ferrari 067/6	31; 50; 51; 87	(France) Esteban Ocon (Japan) Ryo Hirakawa (Brazil) Rafael Câmara (United Kingdom) Oliver Bearman	1–19 (Note: Esteban Ocon was entered into the Mexico City Grand Prix, but was later withdrawn following a disagreement and discussion with his team members.); 19; 20–21; 1–21
(United Kingdom) McLaren Mastercard F1 Team	McLaren-Mercedes	MCL40	Mercedes-AMG F1 M17	1; 81	(United Kingdom) Lando Norris (Australia) Oscar Piastri	1–21; 1–21
(Germany) Mercedes-AMG Petronas F1 Team	Mercedes	F1 W17	Mercedes-AMG F1 M17	12; 63	(Italy) Kimi Antonelli (United Kingdom) George Russell	1–21; 1–21
(Italy) Visa Cash App Racing Bulls F1 Team	Racing Bulls-Red Bull Ford	VCARB 03	Red Bull Ford DM01	30; 22; 41	(New Zealand) Liam Lawson (Japan) Yuki Tsunoda (United Kingdom) Arvid Lindblad	1–11, 15–21; 12–14; 1–21
(Austria) Oracle Red Bull Racing	Red Bull Racing-Red Bull Ford	RB22	Red Bull Ford DM01	3; 6; 30	(Netherlands) Max Verstappen (France) Isack Hadjar (New Zealand) Liam Lawson	1–21; 1–11, 15–21; 12–14

=== Free practice drivers ===
On four occasions throughout the season (twice for each car), each team must field a driver who has not competed in more than two races in one of the first two free practice sessions of a Grand Prix weekend. Arvid Lindblad's participation at the Australian and Chinese Grands Prix fulfilled both of the required rookie sessions for his car at Racing Bulls.

Drivers that took part in first or second free practice sessions
Constructor	Practice drivers		
Constructor	No.	Driver name	Rounds
Alpine-Mercedes	61; 62	(Estonia) Paul Aron (Italy) Gabriele Minì	11, 13; 19–20
Aston Martin Aramco-Honda	34	(United States) Jak Crawford	3, 8, 10, 19, 21 (Note: As wet conditions limited the running in the first free practice session for the Las Vegas Grand Prix, Jak Crawford, Dino Beganovic, and Ryo Hirakawa did not choose to complete an entire lap.)
Atlassian Williams-Mercedes	46	(Great Britain) Luke Browning	7–8, (Note: Despite being initially entered to take part in the first free practice session for Williams at the Barcelona-Catalunya Grand Prix, Luke Browning was not able to run due to an electrical failure on his car.) 13, 19–20
Audi	97; 98	(Estonia) Paul Aron (Great Britain) Freddie Slater	7–8; 19–20
Cadillac-Ferrari	25	(United States) Colton Herta	7, 11, 13, 18–20
Ferrari	38	(Sweden) Dino Beganovic	7–8, 20–21
Haas-Ferrari	50	(Japan) Ryo Hirakawa	8, 11, 19, 21
McLaren-Mercedes	67	(Italy) Leonardo Fornaroli	7, 11, 19–20
Mercedes	72	(Denmark) Frederik Vesti	7, 11, 19
Racing Bulls-Red Bull Ford	90; 91	(Japan) Ayumu Iwasa (Bulgaria) Nikola Tsolov	8; 19
Red Bull Racing-Red Bull Ford	36	(Japan) Ayumu Iwasa	7, 13, 19

=== Team changes ===
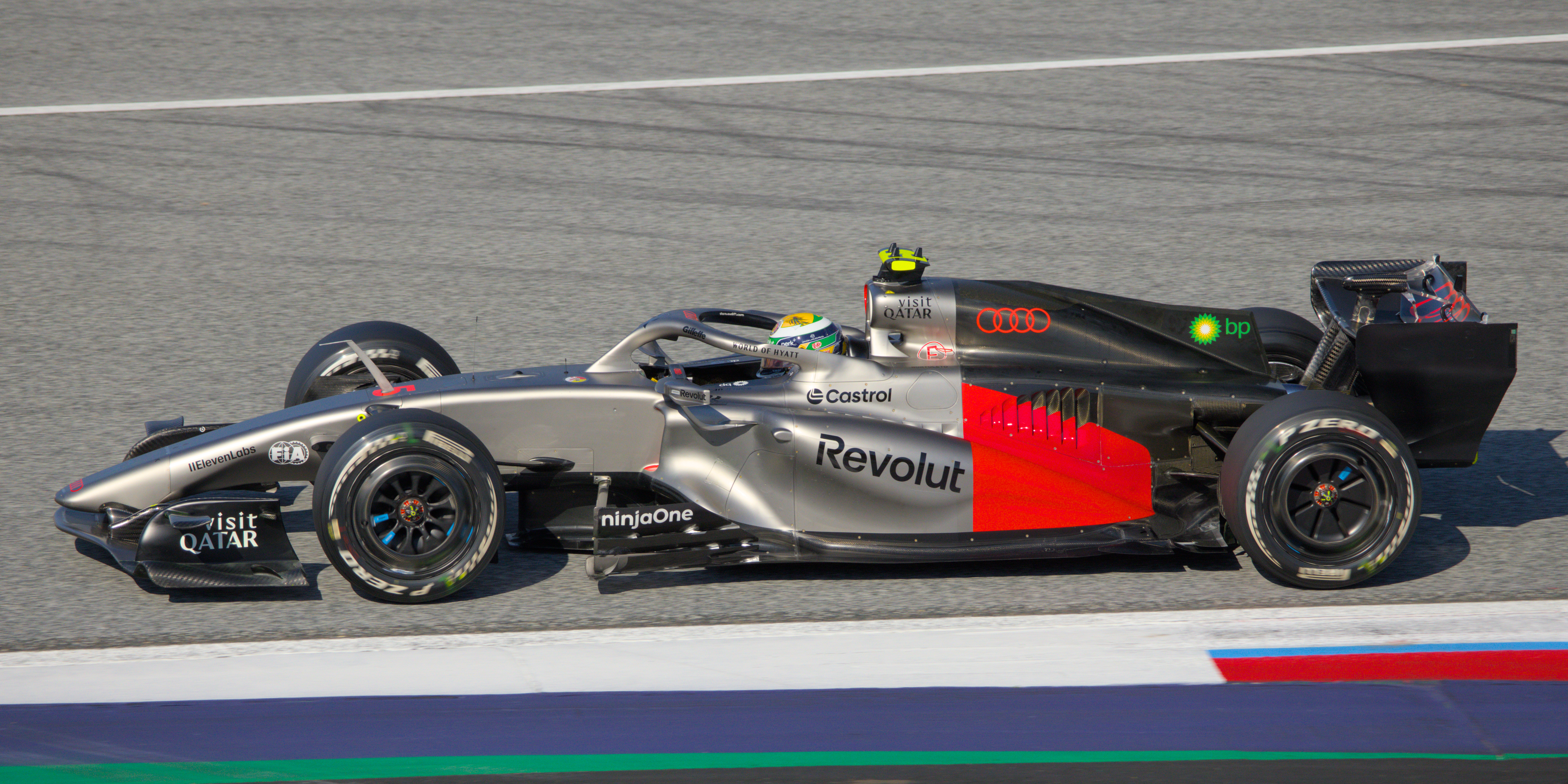
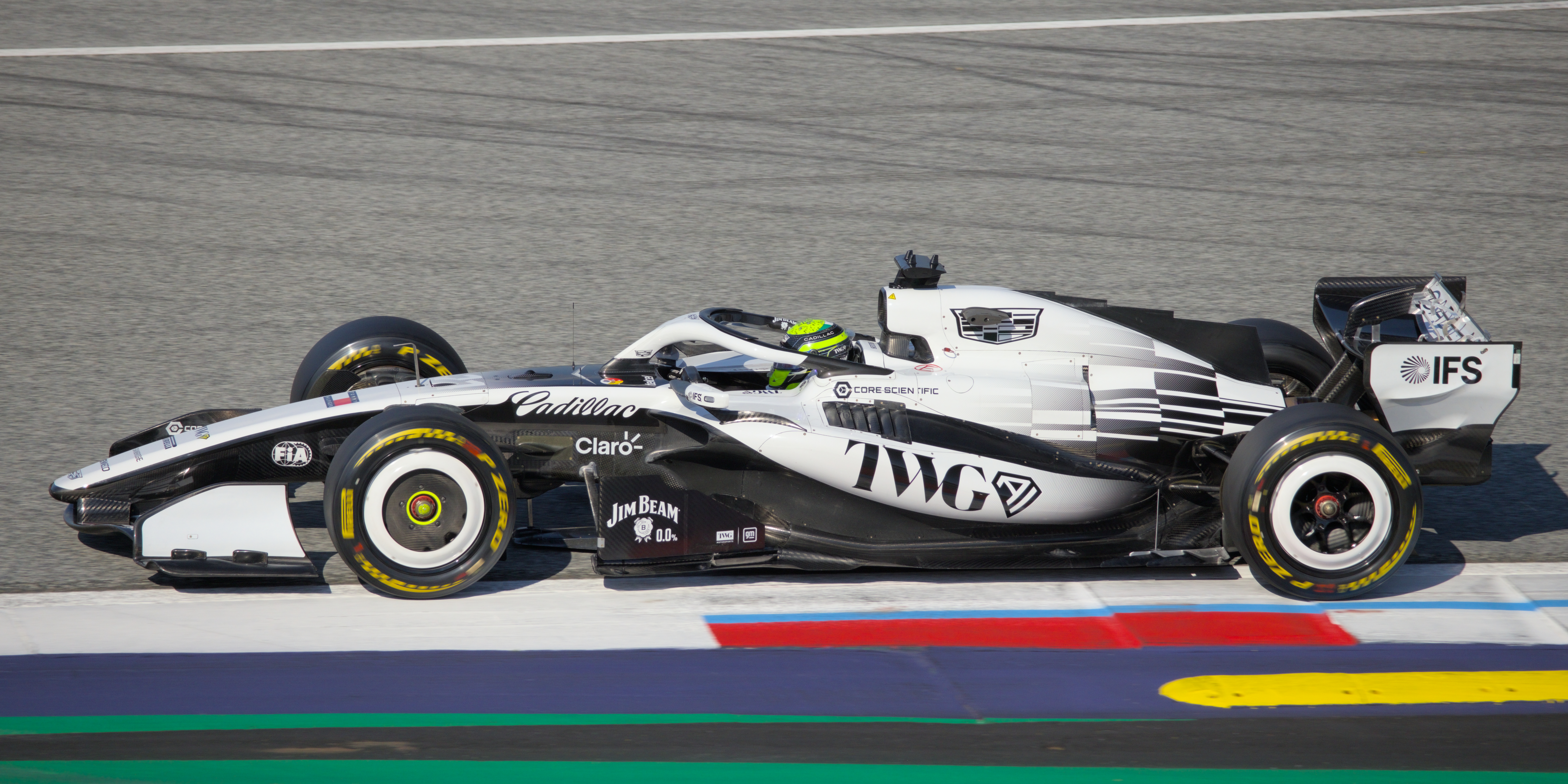
Two car manufacturers entered in 2026: Audi (left) replaced Sauber to compete as a works team, while Cadillac (right) became the eleventh team in the Championship.

Cadillac became the eleventh team, marking Cadillac's first appearance in the series and the first new team on the grid since Haas in 2016. The team, initially using Ferrari power units and gearboxes, would transition to a power unit developed in-house by its parent company, General Motors, in collaboration with TWG Motorsports. This power unit programme has received approval from the FIA and is scheduled to be introduced from the 2029 season. Cadillac had previously tried to enter Formula One in conjunction with Andretti Global.

Ford returned to Formula One for the first time since 2004 after forming a partnership with Red Bull Powertrains. Honda returned as an independent engine supplier for the first time since 2021, this time as supplier for Aston Martin.

Three new engine manufacturers entered Formula One, coinciding with the engine regulation changes. Audi entered the sport for the first time, having purchased the existing Sauber team in 2024. Audi's predecessor company Auto Union did compete in Grand Prix racing prior to World War II and the inception of the World Championship in 1950. The team raced in 2024 and 2025 as Kick Sauber, using Ferrari engines, before it became the Audi factory team in 2026. Thus, Ferrari is supplying Haas and Cadillac as customer teams.

Ford returned to Formula One as an engine supplier for the first time since it provided engines for its former customer team Jordan in 2004. It formed a partnership with Red Bull Powertrains, which supplies Red Bull Racing and their second team Racing Bulls. Honda, which partially withdrew from Formula One in 2021 whilst remaining partners of Red Bull Powertrains, split from the two Red Bull-owned teams and relaunched a fully-independent engine programme supplying Aston Martin under the Honda Racing Corporation subsidiary. Aston Martin had used Mercedes power units since they re-joined the sport, who had supplied engines to Aston Martin's predecessors since 2009. Honda had previously collaborated with Aston Martin's predecessor Jordan from 1998 to 2002.

Renault ceased to provide engines for Alpine from 2026 after achieving poor results since the beginning of the hybrid power unit regulations in 2014. 2026 is thus the first season without Renault as engine supplier since the 2000 championship. Alpine became a customer team, as opposed to a full works outfit, as had been the case since Renault reacquired Team Enstone ahead of the 2016 season. Alpine became a customer team of Mercedes, utilising their engines and gearboxes from this season onwards; up until this point, 2015 marked the last time a rendition of Team Enstone used customer Mercedes engines, competing as Lotus.

=== Driver changes ===
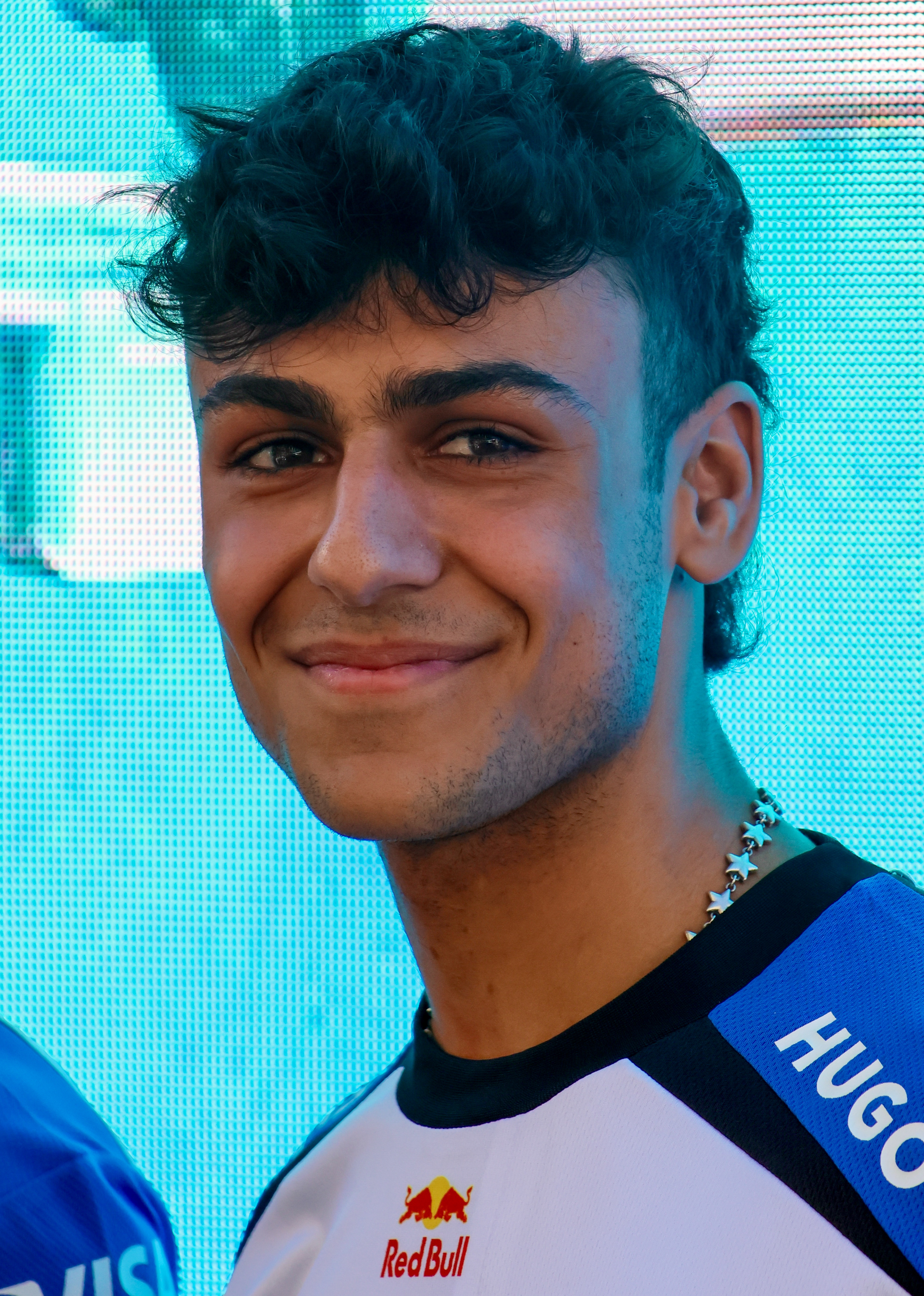
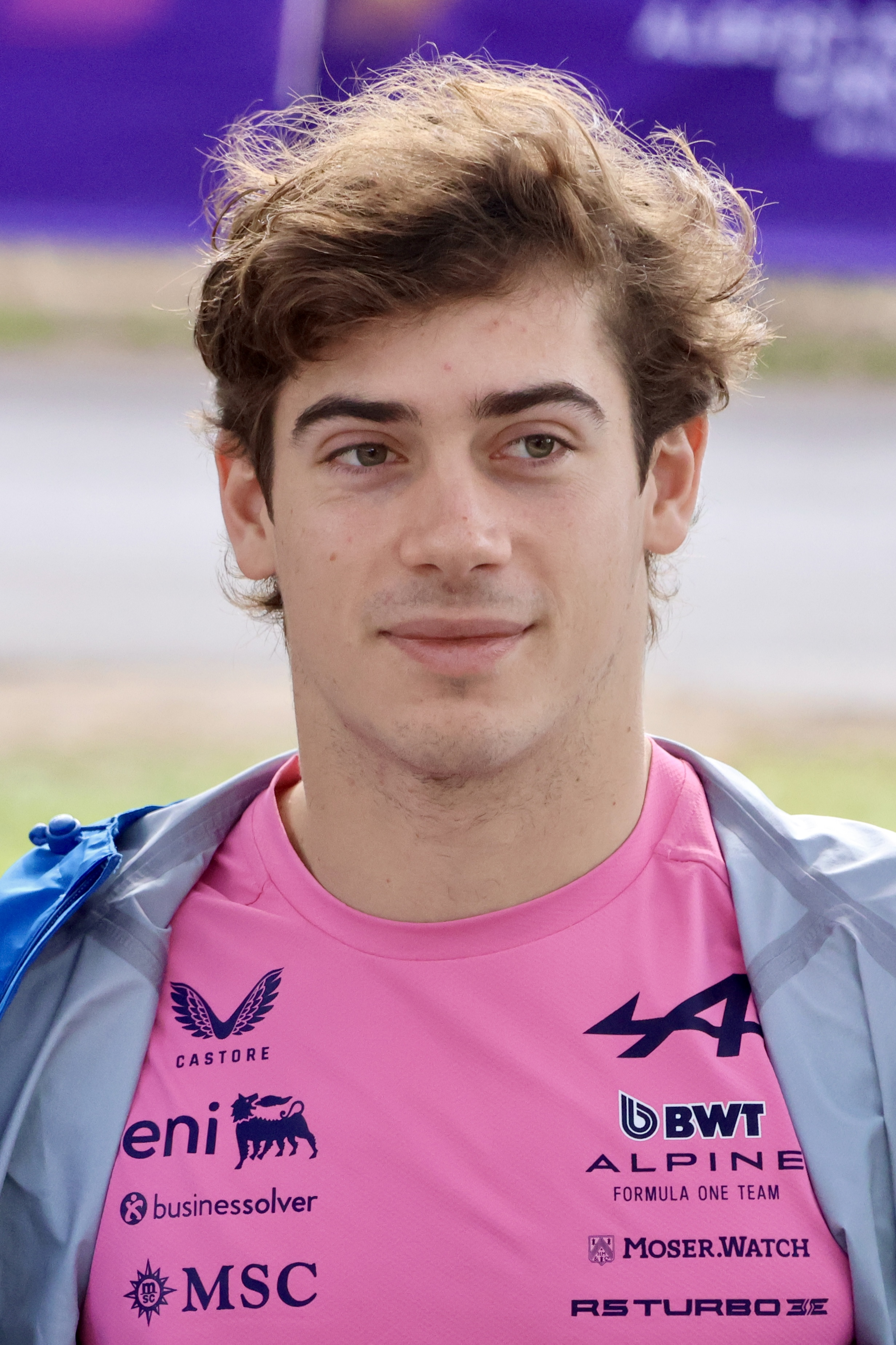
Arvid Lindblad (left) and Franco Colapinto (right) made their full season debuts with Racing Bulls and Alpine, respectively.

Sergio Pérez and Valtteri Bottas returned to full time seats with Cadillac. Pérez had previously signed a two-year contract with Red Bull Racing until 2026, but this was terminated by mutual agreement at the end of the 2024 season. Bottas last competed with Sauber in 2024 and was one of Mercedes's reserve drivers for 2025. Isack Hadjar moved from Racing Bulls to Red Bull Racing, replacing Yuki Tsunoda, who became Red Bull's test and reserve driver. Hadjar's replacement was Arvid Lindblad, who was promoted from Formula 2.

==== In-season changes ====
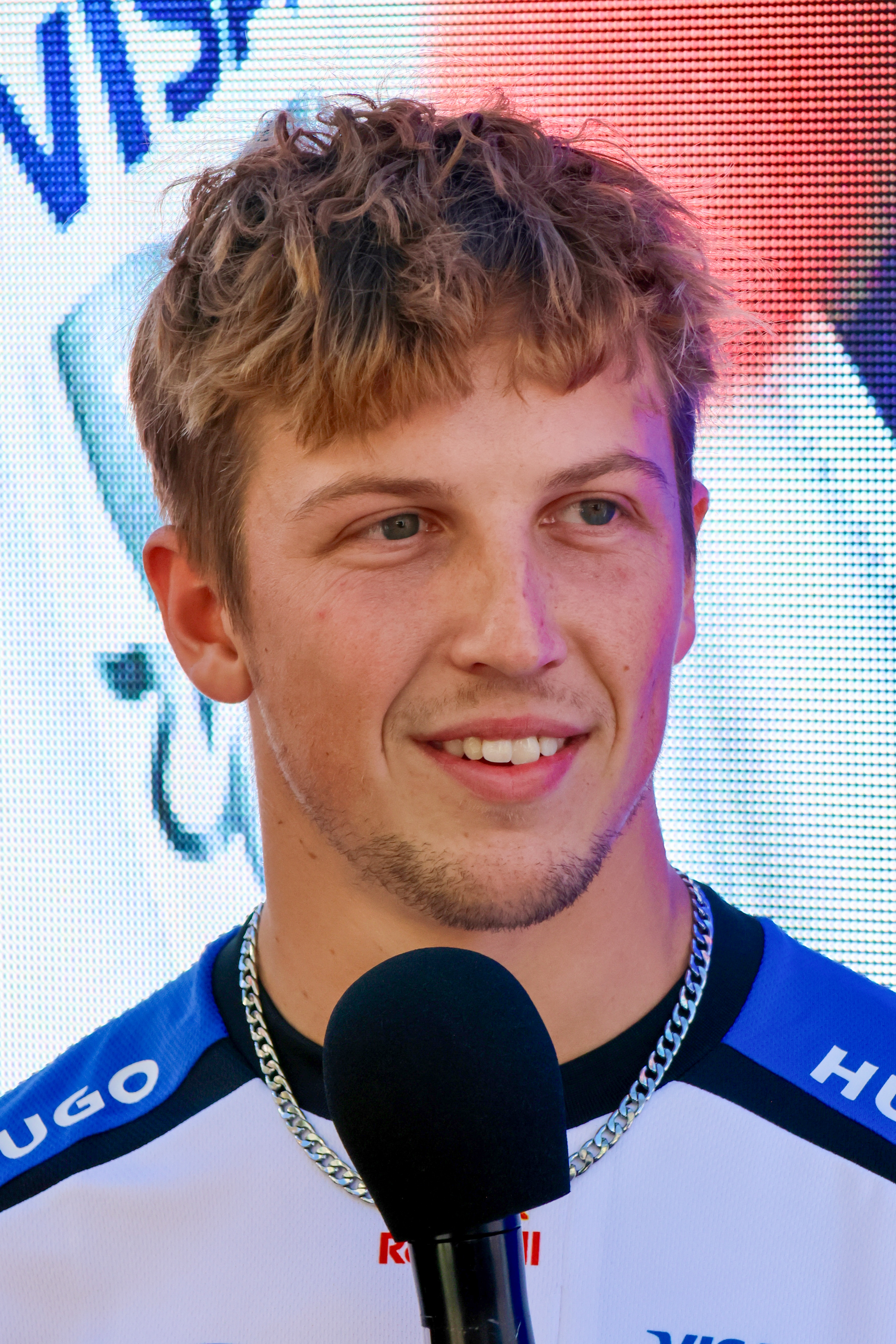
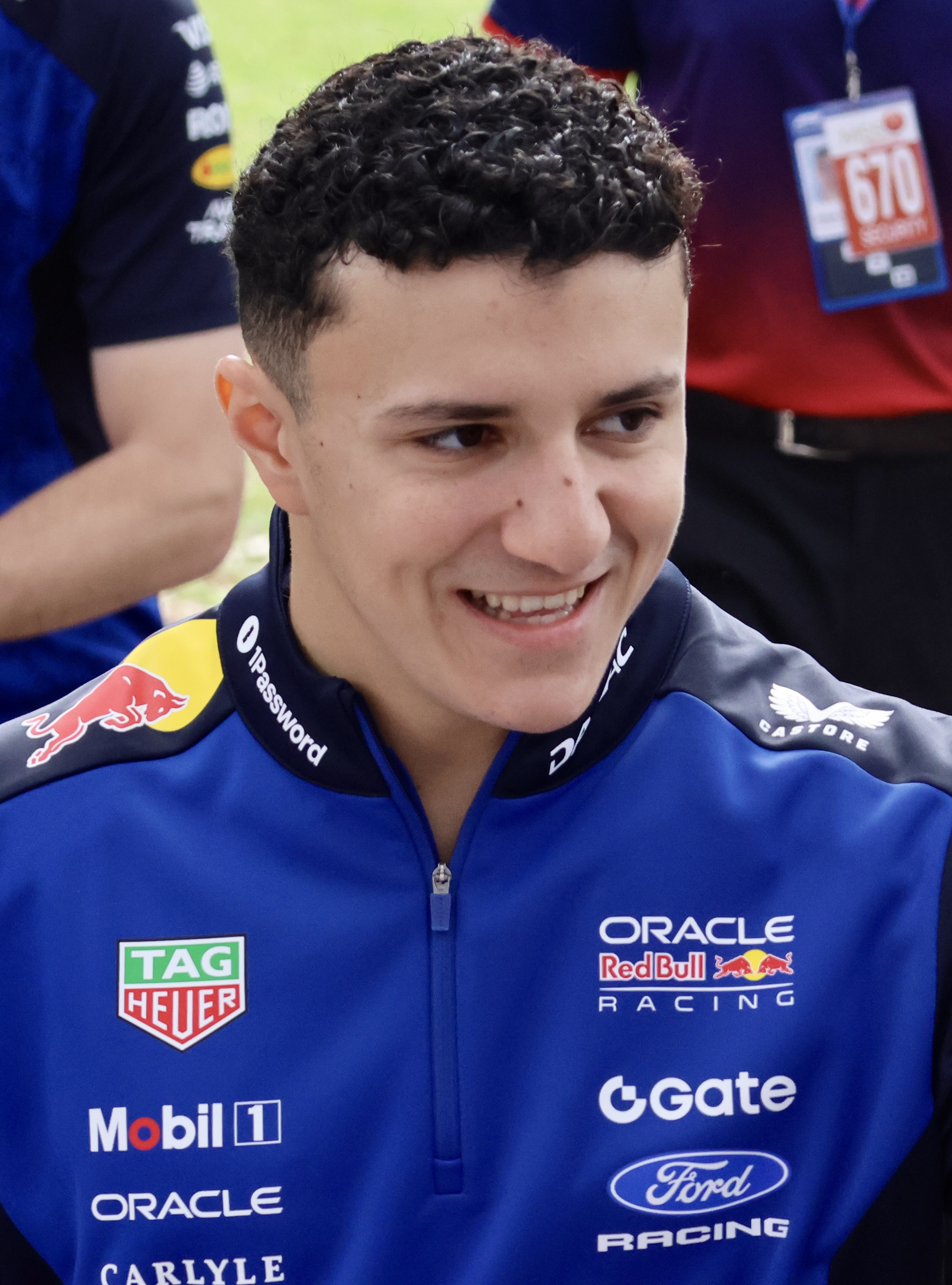
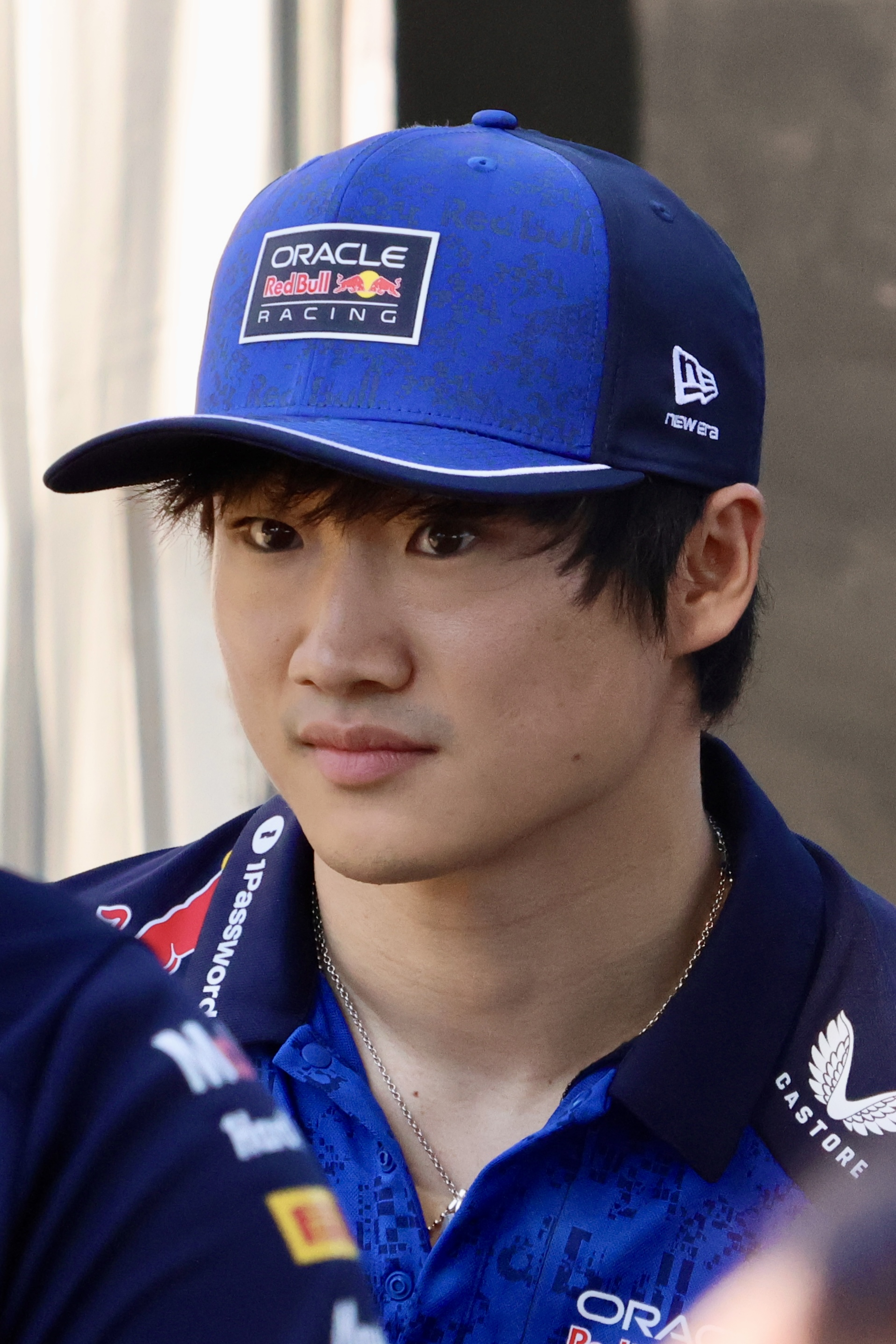
Isack Hadjar (centre) missed three Grands Prix due to injury. Liam Lawson (left) substituted for Hadjar at Red Bull Racing and Yuki Tsunoda (right) substituted for Lawson at Racing Bulls.
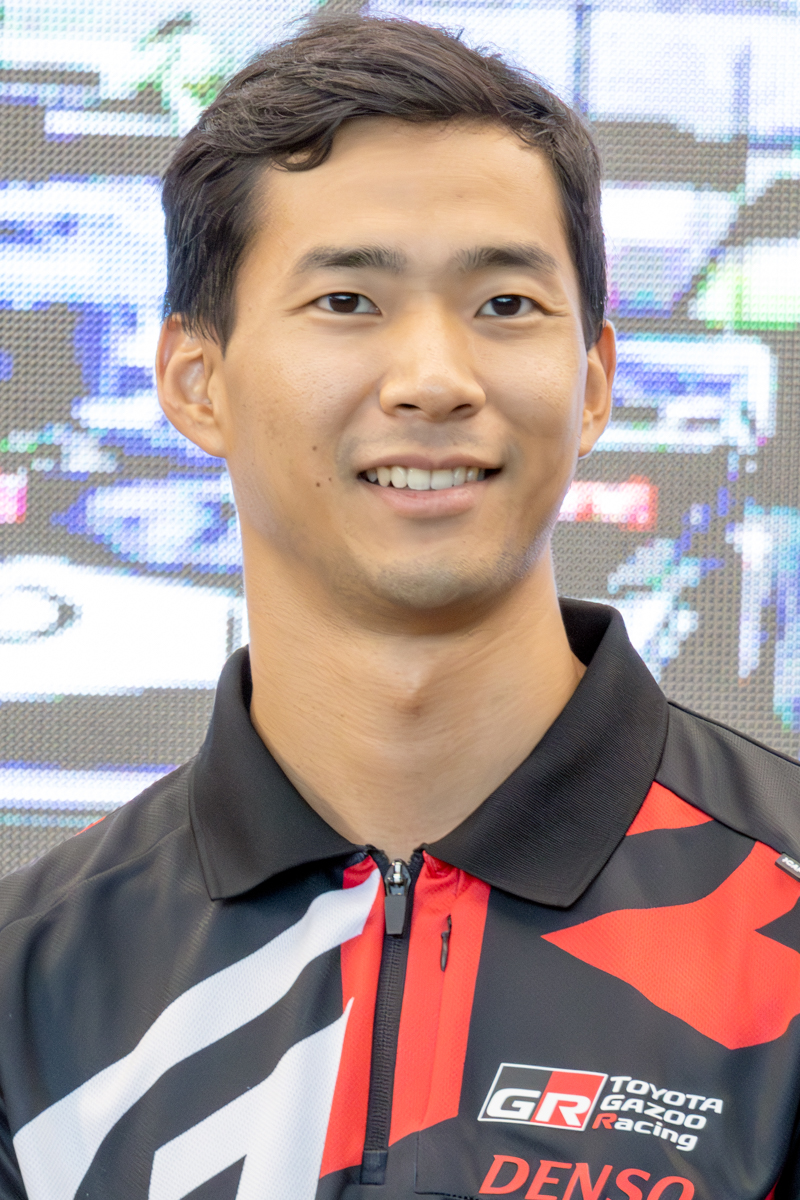
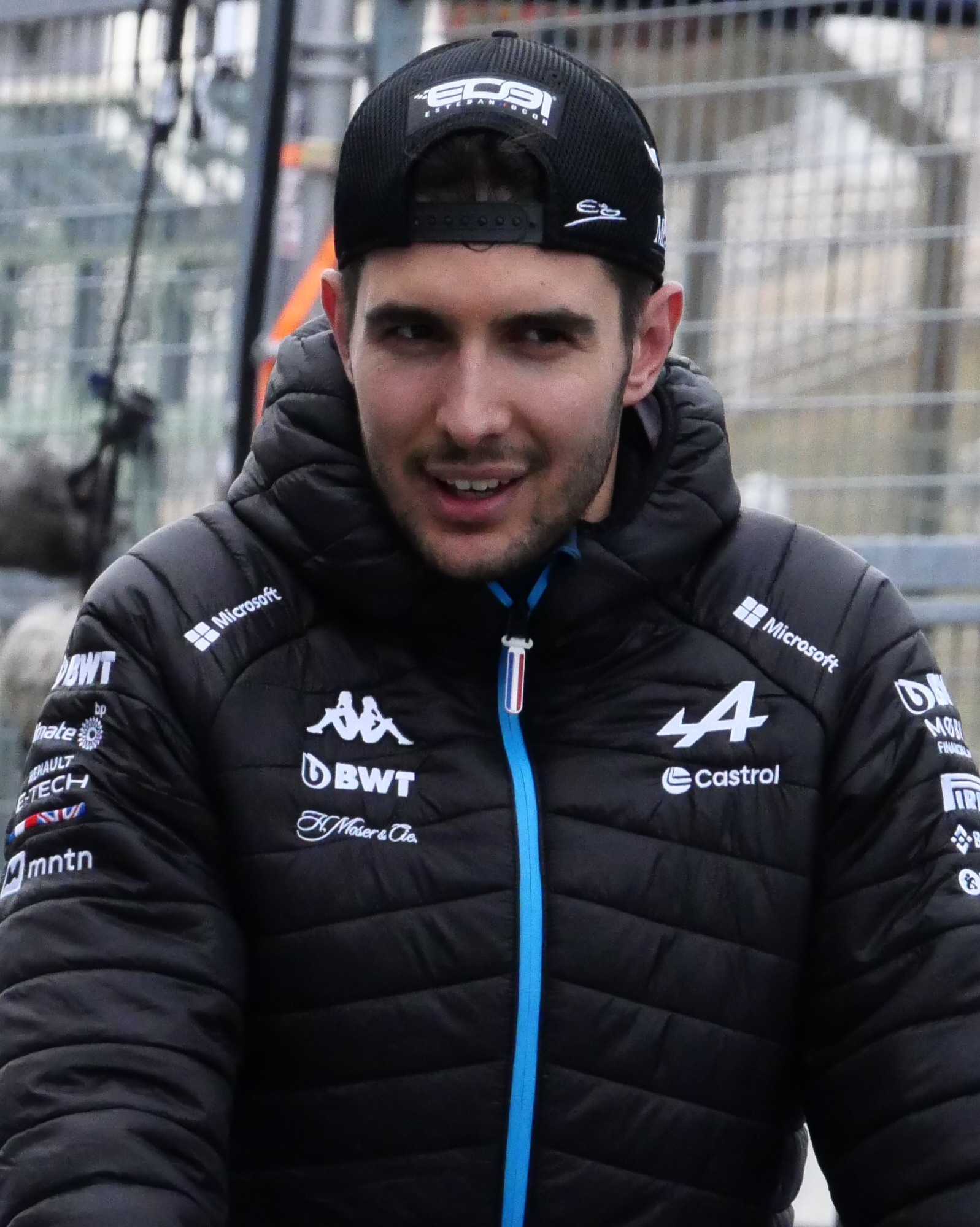
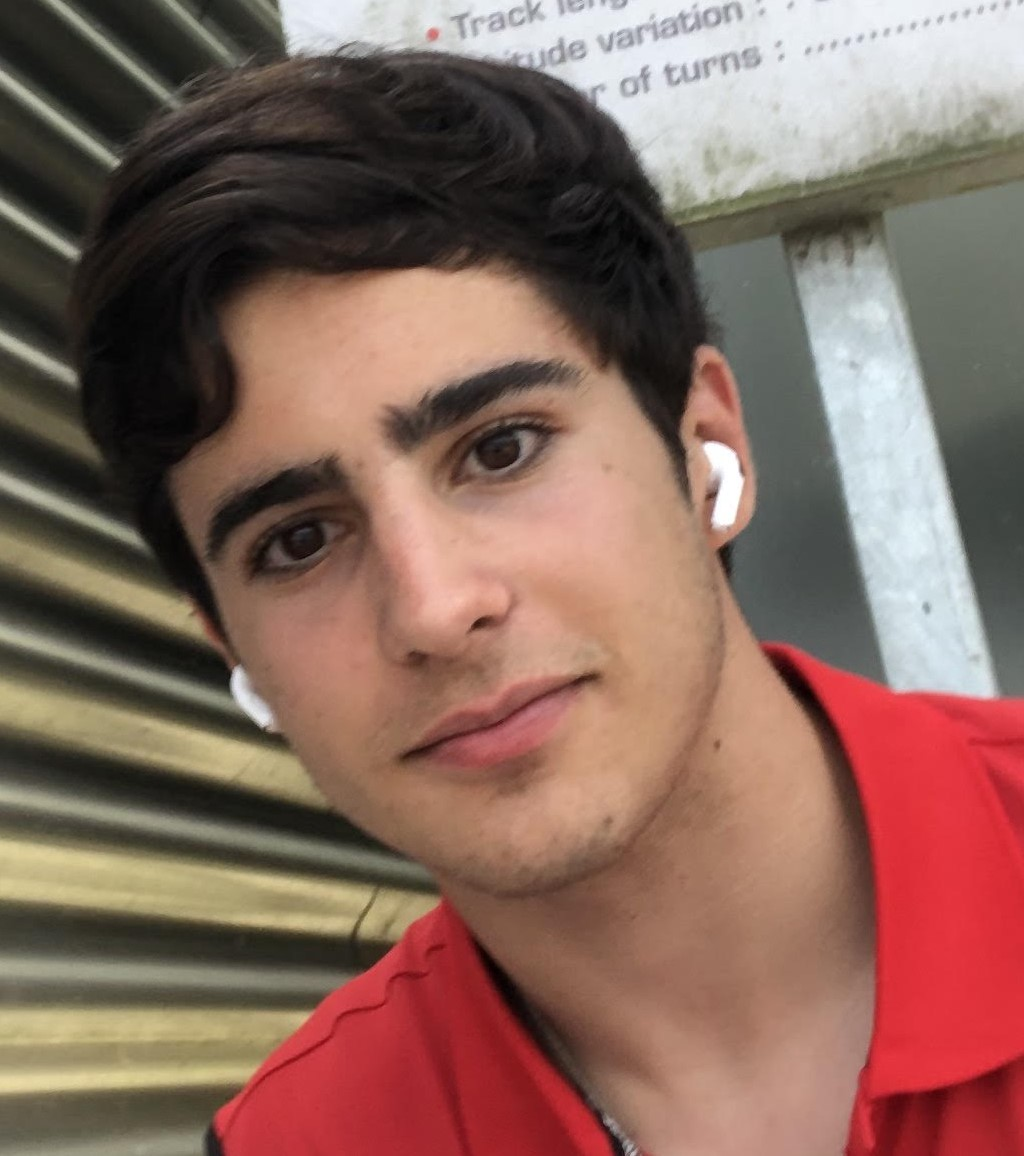
After Esteban Ocon (centre) left Haas during the Mexico City Grand Prix, he was replaced by Ryo Hirakawa (left) for this event, and then by Rafael Câmara (right) for the last four rounds of the season.

Prior to the Dutch Grand Prix, Isack Hadjar sustained a wrist injury. Racing Bulls driver Liam Lawson substituted for him, while Lawson was replaced at Racing Bulls by reserve driver Yuki Tsunoda. Both drivers remained at their respective teams after Hadjar also missed the Italian and Spanish Grands Prix. Hadjar returned for the Azerbaijan Grand Prix.

Ryo Hirakawa stood in for Esteban Ocon at Haas for the Mexico City Grand Prix after Ocon was removed from the line-up following a disagreement and subsequent discussions with team members after the second free practice session. After already being signed to the team for the 2027 season, Rafael Câmara made his debut early in his home race at the São Paulo Grand Prix to stand in for Ocon for the rest of the season.

== Calendar ==
Nations that are scheduled to host a Grand Prix in 2026 are highlighted in green, with circuit locations marked with a black dot. Former host nations are shown in dark grey, and former host circuits are marked with a white dot. De facto borders are shown.

The 2026 calendar originally comprised twenty-four Grands Prix, as with the previous two seasons. The Saudi Arabian Grand Prix was cancelled following the outbreak of the Iran war, reducing the count of confirmed Grands Prix to twenty-three. The Chinese, Miami, Canadian, British, Dutch, and Singapore Grands Prix feature the sprint format.

Round	Grand Prix	Circuit	Race date
1	Australian Grand Prix	(Australia) Albert Park Circuit, Melbourne	8 March
2	Chinese Grand Prix	(China) Shanghai International Circuit, Shanghai	15 March
3	Japanese Grand Prix	(Japan) Suzuka Circuit, Suzuka	29 March
4	Miami Grand Prix	(United States) Miami International Autodrome, Miami Gardens, Florida	3 May
5	Canadian Grand Prix	(Canada) Circuit Gilles Villeneuve, Montreal	24 May
6	Monaco Grand Prix	Circuit de Monaco, Monaco	7 June
7	Barcelona-Catalunya Grand Prix	(Spain) Circuit de Barcelona-Catalunya, Montmeló	14 June
8	Austrian Grand Prix	(Austria) Red Bull Ring, Spielberg	28 June
9	British Grand Prix	(United Kingdom) Silverstone Circuit, Silverstone	5 July
10	Belgian Grand Prix	(Belgium) Circuit de Spa-Francorchamps, Stavelot	19 July
11	Hungarian Grand Prix	(Hungary) Hungaroring, Mogyoród	26 July
12	Dutch Grand Prix	(Netherlands) Circuit Zandvoort, Zandvoort	23 August
13	Italian Grand Prix	(Italy) Monza Circuit, Monza	6 September
14	Spanish Grand Prix	(Spain) Madring, Madrid	13 September
15	Azerbaijan Grand Prix	(Azerbaijan) Baku City Circuit, Baku	26 September (Note: Saturday race.) (Note: The Azerbaijan Grand Prix was originally scheduled for 27 September but was moved forward by one day to accommodate Remembrance Day, following a request from the promoter and relevant government stakeholders.)
16	Bahrain Grand Prix in Malaysia	(Malaysia) Sepang International Circuit, Sepang	4 October (Note: The Bahrain Grand Prix was originally scheduled for 12 April at the Bahrain International Circuit but was postponed and moved to the Sepang International Circuit in Malaysia following the outbreak of the Iran war.)
17	Singapore Grand Prix	Marina Bay Street Circuit, Singapore	11 October
18	United States Grand Prix	(United States) Circuit of the Americas, Austin, Texas	25 October
19	Mexico City Grand Prix	Autódromo Hermanos Rodríguez, Mexico City	1 November
20	São Paulo Grand Prix	(Brazil) Interlagos Circuit, São Paulo	8 November
21	Las Vegas Grand Prix	(United States) Las Vegas Strip Circuit, Paradise, Nevada	21 November
22	Qatar Grand Prix	(Qatar) Lusail International Circuit, Lusail	29 November
23	Abu Dhabi Grand Prix	(United Arab Emirates) Yas Marina Circuit, Abu Dhabi	6 December

=== Postponed and cancelled Grands Prix ===
The Bahrain and Saudi Arabian Grands Prix were included on the original calendar published by the World Motor Sport Council and were contracted for the 2026 season, but were postponed following the outbreak of the Iran war. Concerns revolving around safety following the breakout of the war were taken into consideration, with the FIA monitoring the situation as it unfolded. Ultimately, it was announced that neither race would take place on its originally scheduled April date. As the Grands Prix were to be held early in the season, replacement races could not be organised in short notice. The Saudi Arabian Grand Prix was not reinstated, while the Bahrain Grand Prix was rescheduled and relocated to the Sepang International Circuit in Malaysia, rather than being held at its originally planned venue, the Bahrain International Circuit. Despite the venue change, the event retained its original name because the Bahraini government remained the primary financial promoter, rather than this event becoming an instance of the Malaysian Grand Prix.

=== Calendar changes ===
The Spanish Grand Prix moved from the Circuit de Barcelona-Catalunya in Montmeló to a new street circuit in Madrid built around the IFEMA Exhibition Centre. The Circuit de Barcelona-Catalunya continues to host a race under the name Barcelona-Catalunya Grand Prix. The Emilia Romagna Grand Prix in Imola was discontinued after their contract to host their race until 2025 was not renewed. The Azerbaijan Grand Prix was held on a Saturday following a request from the promoter and relevant government stakeholders to accommodate Azerbaijan's Remembrance Day. The Bahrain Grand Prix was moved from Sakhir to the Sepang International Circuit in Malaysia due to the Iran war. The circuit had last hosted the Malaysian Grand Prix in 2017.

== Regulation changes ==
Financial, power unit, aerodynamic, geometric, and safety regulations were altered for the 2026 season.

=== Financial regulation ===
For 2026, the Formula One cost cap for team operational expenditures was increased from $135 million to $215 million. This was primarily due to inflation adjustments and the inclusion of costs that were previously exempted from the cap. Key expenses remaining outside the cost cap include driver salaries, the salaries of the three highest-paid team members, marketing, travel and hospitality costs, as well as infrastructure investments. A separate cost cap for power unit manufacturers, which was introduced in 2023, was also increased from $95 million to $130 million from 2026 onwards to support the development of the new hybrid engines.

=== Technical regulations ===
==== Power units ====
New power unit regulations have been introduced for the 2026 season. The new power units still produce over 1,000 bhp (750 kW), although the power comes from different sources. The engine regulations saw the turbocharged 1.6-litre V6 internal combustion engine configuration used since 2014 retained. However, the MGU-H (Motor Generator Unit – Heat), which has also been in use since 2014, has been removed, while the MGU-K (Motor Generator Unit – Kinetic) output increased to 470 bhp (350 kW) from 160 bhp (120 kW). The power output of the internal combustion part of the power unit decreased to 540 bhp (400 kW) from 850 bhp (630 kW). Fuel flow rates are measured and limited based on energy, rather than mass of the fuel itself. The power units use a fully sustainable fuel being developed by Formula One. The power units are expected to recover twice as much electrical energy as before.

During the Commission meeting in early 2025, it was agreed to explore for catch-up options for power unit development for manufacturers who may have fallen behind their competitors in the initial development phase. The Commission also suggested that a relevant advisory committee look at whether the energy deployment of new power units should be reduced in race trim from the planned 470 bhp (350 kW) after some teams became concerned about the possibility of their cars running out of deployable energy in a race.

The Japanese Grand Prix saw Oliver Bearman crash at a high speed due to a speed differential that was caused by him using more electrical energy than Franco Colapinto, who opted to harvest his energy. The power unit changes that mandated the increased usage of the battery and electric power deployment modes came under scrutiny from drivers. The FIA held a review with power unit developers on 9 April regarding potential refinements to the regulations. One of the solutions was to reduce the deployment rate of electrical energy while increasing the amount that can be harvested while undergoing "super clipping", a phenomenon that occurs when the battery is being charged on full throttle against the engine. Three further meetings were held on 15, 16 and 20 April, where further options would be evaluated and agreed on by team representatives, the FIA, Formula One Management, and power unit manufacturers.

Going into the Miami Grand Prix, changes were announced to be made to the power unit. Those include an increase to the "super clipping" limit from 340 bhp (250 kW) to 470 bhp (350 kW). It intends to reduce its duration to 2–4 seconds per lap. Though the cars will still lose top speed on the straights, this reduces the need to apply lift and coast as the speed difference is considered much more natural. For qualifying, the harvesting limit was reduced from 8 MJ (2.2 kWh) to 7 MJ (1.9 kWh), with the potential to reduce it further for some races.

==== Car size and aerodynamics ====
On 6 June 2024, the 2026 car concept was revealed. The concept featured new active aerodynamics in both the front and rear wings. The concept saw the elimination of the drag reduction system (DRS), being replaced by a new overtake mode, initially referred to as manual override mode. The wheelbase was reduced from 360 cm (140 in) to 340 cm (130 in), the width was reduced from 200 cm (79 in) to 190 cm (75 in), and the minimum mass was reduced by 30 kg (66 lb). The tyres' widths were also reduced by 2.5 cm (0.98 in) on the front pair and by 3.0 cm (1.2 in) on the rears. The floor reduced ground effect to ease the issues cars have suffered with porpoising.

In October 2024, FIA announced that the downforce reduction of the 2026 cars compared to the 2022–2025 generation of cars would be less than initially proposed for performance and safety reasons. Later in the month, the FIA confirmed that the reduction in downforce from the 2026 generation of cars would be around 15%, a significantly smaller reduction than the originally drafted regulations which the FIA claimed had given the 2026 cars downforce reduction of over 40% compared to their predecessors. This would make the 2026 cars approximately two seconds slower a lap than the 2022–2025 generation of cars rather than the four seconds slower initially envisaged. On 17 December 2025, Formula One announced the official terms describing features of the 2026 cars. The term "boost mode" is used to describe the normal deployment of the energy recovery system (ERS) to defend or attack; "active aerodynamics" (or simply "active aero") to describe the moveable front and rear wing elements – in both higher and lower drag/downforce configuration (called "corner mode" and "straightline mode" respectively); "recharge" to describe when a car is harvesting electrical energy; and "overtake mode" to describe a mode where extra energy stored is used in order to help one driver overtake another, but only if the driver behind is within one second of the one ahead (similar to pre-2026 DRS deployment rules).

Due to the track's tight, twisty nature, the only Grand Prix where active aero was disabled was the Monaco Grand Prix, which historically had one DRS zone.

==== Safety features ====
The regulations for the front impact structure (FIS) were updated with the intent to enhance safety during crashes. A two-stage FIS design has been introduced to address previous issues where the structure detached near the survival cell after a primary collision, leaving the vehicle vulnerable to further impacts. Side intrusion protection, particularly around the cockpit and fuel cell was also improved. These upgrades aim to shield critical areas of the car during side collisions, while maintaining the vehicle's weight. The roll hoop's strength was improved, withstanding loads increased from 16 g to 20 g, aligning with safety standards of other single-seater series. The load testing requirements were raised from 141 kN to 167 kN. To further safeguard drivers and track marshals, lateral safety lights were mandated. These lights display the energy recovery system (ERS) status of a car when it stops on track, providing visual indicators of potential electrical risks, especially in emergency situations.

=== Sporting regulations ===
- The rules surrounding the permanent driver numbering system introduced in 2014 were modified. Drivers are permitted to change their race number during their careers pending permission from the FIA and any past driver that may have used a requested number.
- In order to discourage teams leaving excessive amounts of exposed black carbon on their cars in order to save weight, the FIA mandated that a minimum of 55% of the surface area when viewed from the side and above must be covered by painted or stickered liveries.
- Driver cooling vests are mandated when the FIA declares a heat hazard during a race weekend. Prior to 2026, the cooling vest was optional. Additionally, the vest underwent a redesign.
- For 2026, stewards have the option to initiate a review based on new evidence. Under the previous version of the ISC, a competitor had to submit a right of review request for any decision to be reviewed. The option for competitors to submit a right of review remains in place. Additionally, an "out of competition" stewards panel was introduced for time sensitive decisions that cannot wait until the next event.
- In 2026, the requirement to make a minimum two-stop strategy at the Monaco Grand Prix was dropped. This was implemented in the 2025 race in an effort to promote better racing, but teams and drivers considered that it did not improve the racing quality and overtake opportunities.

== Season summary ==
=== Pre-season ===
Three pre-season tests were held, a significant expansion over previous years' testing programs to account for the new chassis and engine regulations. The first was a private test which took place at the Circuit de Barcelona-Catalunya from 26 to 30 January, with teams allowed to run in a maximum of three of the five days. All teams ran in the private test except Williams. Lewis Hamilton (Ferrari) set the fastest time in the five-day test. The second test was held at the Bahrain International Circuit from 11 to 13 February, with Kimi Antonelli (Mercedes) setting the fastest time in the three-day test. The third test was also held at the same venue from 18 to 20 February, with Charles Leclerc (Ferrari) setting the fastest time across the three-day test.

=== Opening rounds ===
Mercedes' George Russell took pole position for the season opening Australian Grand Prix, ahead of teammate Kimi Antonelli. Isack Hadjar qualified third on his debut for Red Bull. Charles Leclerc jumped from fourth on the grid to take the lead at the start, and proceeded to battle Russell in the early laps, with both drivers taking stints in the lead. After a virtual safety car was called for Hadjar stopping on track with an engine issue, Mercedes brought both their cars in for a pit stop, whereas Ferrari stayed out hoping to take advantage of having newer tyres later on in the race. Mercedes' strategy came up trumps and Russell went on to secure victory, with Antonelli finishing second to complete a Mercedes one–two. Leclerc finished third, holding off a late charge from Hamilton. Reigning World Champion Lando Norris finished fifth for McLaren, having been the team's only starter after Oscar Piastri crashed while driving to the grid before the race. Max Verstappen recovered from 20th on the grid, due to a crash in qualifying, to finish sixth, ahead of Oliver Bearman and rookie Arvid Lindblad. Gabriel Bortoleto and Pierre Gasly completed the top ten and the points-scoring positions. Five drivers retired from the race. In the Drivers' Championship, Russell took the lead for the first time in his career with 25 points, ahead of his teammate Antonelli with 18 points and Leclerc with 15 points.

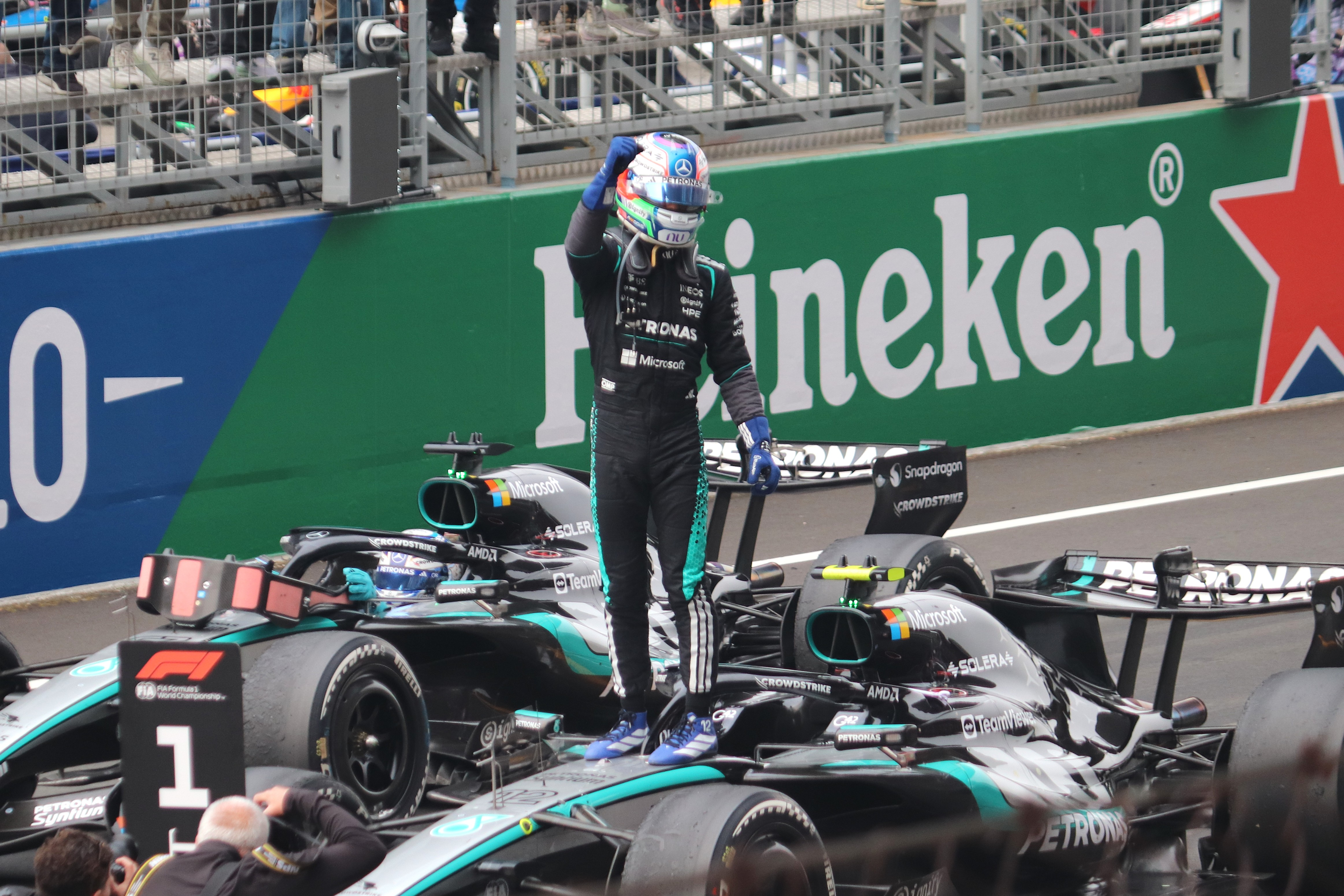
At the Chinese Grand Prix, Kimi Antonelli became the youngest polesitter in Formula One, and the first Italian driver to win a Grand Prix since 2006.

Russell took his maiden sprint pole position for the Chinese Grand Prix, ahead of Antonelli and Norris. The opening laps saw Hamilton take the lead, as he exchanged positions several times with Russell. Hamilton and Leclerc fought for podium places with the latter gaining the advantage. Antonelli dropped down the order in the opening laps, only to have his recovery to second place be thwarted by a penalty from causing a collision with Hadjar on the opening lap, ultimately finishing fifth. Thus, the podium was rounded out by Russell, Leclerc and Hamilton. Antonelli later became the youngest ever Formula One pole-sitter after taking pole position for the main race, while teammate Russell recovered from a mechanical issue to qualify second. Piastri, Norris, Bortoleto, and Albon all did not start the race due to separate car issues. The opening lap saw Hamilton reach the lead again within the first few turns, this time ahead of Antonelli, while Leclerc overtook Russell to take third. Antonelli regained the lead by overtaking Hamilton on lap 2. Following Stroll's battery issue resulting in being stranded at turn 1 and bringing out the safety car, most of the grid initially on the medium compound moved to a one stop strategy. From there, Antonelli held onto the lead to claim his maiden victory ahead of Russell who complete another Mercedes one–two, while Hamilton took third after a lengthy battle with Leclerc, thus achieving his first podium for Ferrari and first since the 2024 Las Vegas Grand Prix. Colapinto also scored his first points for Alpine, and his first since the 2024 United States Grand Prix at Williams.

Antonelli took a second consecutive pole position for the Japanese Grand Prix ahead of Russell and Piastri. After dropping down to as low as sixth, Antonelli made use of a well-timed safety car, brought out due to Oliver Bearman's heavy Haas crash, to retain the lead as he switched to fresher tyres, while teammate Russell finished fourth after briefly dropping down the order to both Ferraris (he managed to repass only Hamilton). Antonelli's victory meant he took his first consecutive victories of the season, and overtook Russell to become the youngest World Drivers' Championship leader; also becoming Italy's first Drivers' Championship leader since Alberto Ascari led, and won, the 1953 championship. Behind him, Piastri, recording his first race start of the season, and Leclerc rounded out the podium.

Several changes to the power unit came into effect at the Miami Grand Prix, having been drafted during the extended break after the Bahrain and Saudi Arabian Grands Prix did not take place on their originally scheduled April dates (see § Power units). Lando Norris took pole in the sprint and proceeded to lead it lights-to-flag, ahead of Piastri and Leclerc. Antonelli, who finished sixth in the sprint after receiving a penalty for track limits, recovered to take pole for the race. Norris passed both Antonelli and Leclerc to lead early on, but lost out to Antonelli during the pit sequence and was unable to repass the Italian. Antonelli went on to win again, and became the first driver to convert his first three consecutive pole positions into wins at the same events. The McLarens of Norris and Piastri completed the podium. The race was eventful; Verstappen and Leclerc spun at the start and tail end of the race, respectively, with Leclerc sustaining damage to his front-left suspension as a result. Meanwhile, Liam Lawson, whose car had an issue, hit Gasly, who flipped into a wall, while Isack Hadjar, crashed at the turn fourteen chicane on the same lap. Franco Colapinto finished a career-best seventh, bettering his previous result of tenth despite contact with Hamilton on the opening lap, leaving the latter with damage that affected his car's performance.

=== Mid-season rounds ===
The Canadian Grand Prix saw Russell take pole position for the sprint event. During the sprint, he squabbled with teammate Antonelli, who went off-track numerous times trying to take the lead. Russell ultimately won the event ahead of Norris and Antonelli, the latter having dropped down to third after attempting another move on Russell. Russell then took pole position for the race itself; once again, he battled against Antonelli for the lead, though Russell was forced out of the race and contention for the win after a power unit failure, with Antonelli taking his fourth consecutive victory. Behind him, Hamilton bettered his highest finish at Ferrari with a second-place finish, with Max Verstappen achieving his and Red Bull's first podium of the season just behind Hamilton. Six drivers retired, including Norris, whose gearbox experienced a failure, and Sergio Pérez, recording Cadillac's first retirement thanks to a spontaneous suspension failure. Colapinto bettered his Miami result by finishing sixth, and Oscar Piastri finished outside the points: he struck Alexander Albon, forcing Albon to retire on the spot and Piastri to pit for repairs, and received a ten-second penalty for the incident.

Active aerodynamics were disabled for the Monaco Grand Prix due to the track's narrow layout and lack of straights (see #Car size and aerodynamics). During the Grand Prix, Verstappen, Bottas, Bearman and Norris retired all due to reliability issues, and numerous penalties were applied. During the late stages of the race, Lance Stroll crashed his car in a manner that led to the safety car being deployed; at the resulting restart Leclerc crashed at the exact same corner, bringing about a lengthy red flag while officials inspected the track surface. Furthermore, Carlos Sainz Jr.'s streak of points at Monaco came to an end due to two separate hits to his Williams by Nico Hülkenberg and Colapinto, with Hülkenberg receiving a ten-second time penalty which dropped him out of the points as well. Antonelli converted his pole position into a win, becoming the youngest winner of the Monaco Grand Prix and the youngest to achieve a grand chelem. Isack Hadjar stood on the podium after Pierre Gasly received two five-second penalties for pit-lane speeding during the race, which dropped Gasly from third to seventh in the classification. Hadjar was temporarily demoted to fourth when Alpine successfully appealed the penalties, reinstating Gasly to third. This decision was ultimately reversed in September by the FIA after McLaren and Red Bull filed an appeal against the decision. Fernando Alonso recorded Aston Martin's first point of the season following a deluge of penalties being applied, which initially saw Pérez provisionally finish in tenth. Repeating his result in Canada, Hamilton finished in second for Ferrari, while his former Mercedes teammate Russell finished outside the points following a drive-through penalty.

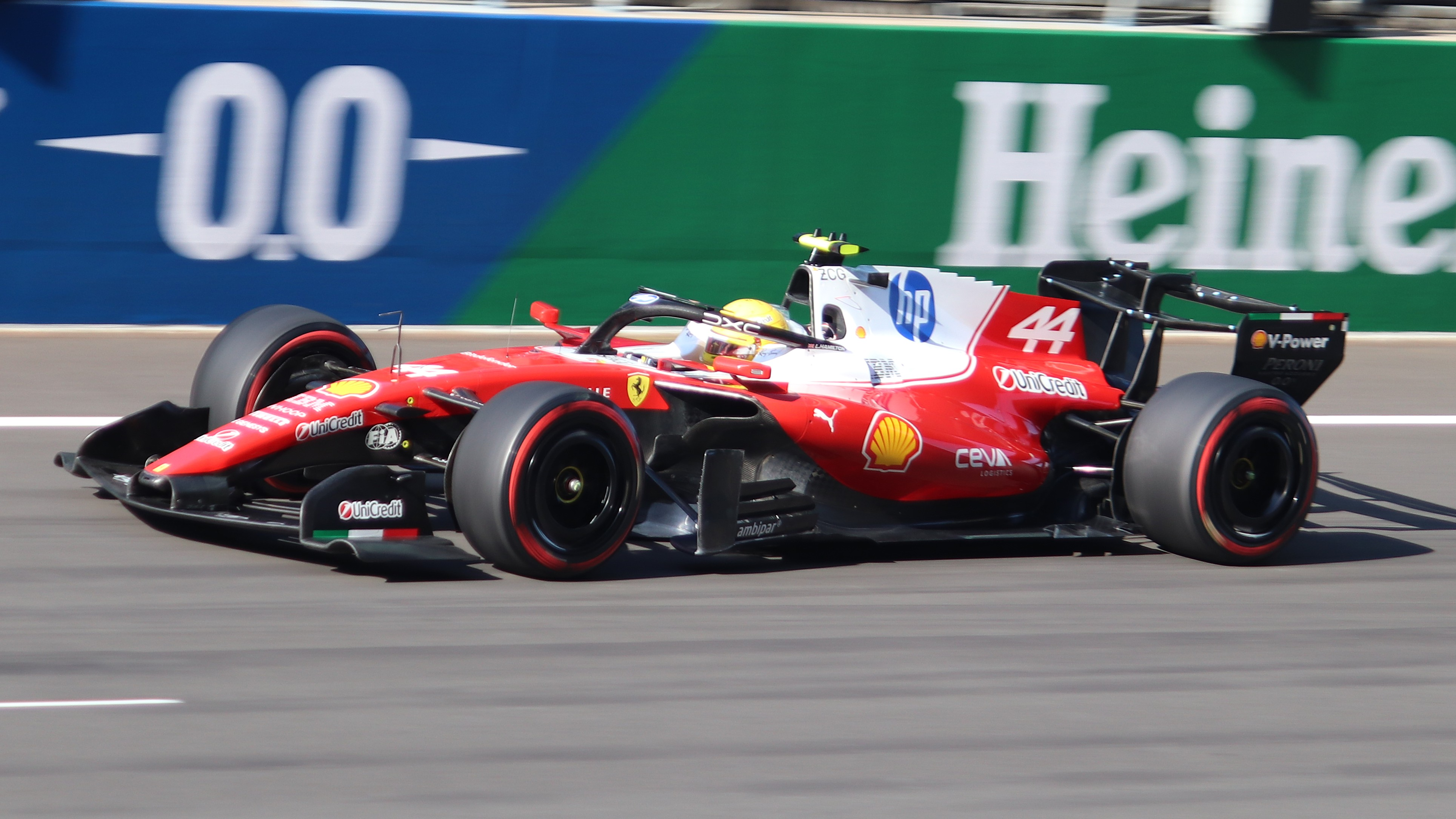
Lewis Hamilton (top) became the oldest Grand Prix winner since Jack Brabham in 1970, after claiming his maiden win for Ferrari at the Barcelona-Catalunya Grand Prix. Charles Leclerc (bottom) clinched Ferrari's 250th Grand Prix victory at the British Grand Prix.

Russell topped two out of three practice sessions and qualifying for the maiden Barcelona-Catalunya Grand Prix and led the first half of the race, before Fernando Alonso retired with a battery failure. This brought out the virtual safety car and allowed Lewis Hamilton, who was running on an alternate strategy, to switch to new hard tyres and rejoin ahead of Russell in the lead. Late in the race, Russell was hounded by Antonelli, who passed him for second only to retire a lap later with a power unit failure. This retirement allowed Russell to take points off of Antonelli. Hamilton took his maiden win for Ferrari, and his first victory since the 2024 Belgian Grand Prix. Russell finished second, with Lando Norris third, producing the first all-British Formula One podium since the 1968 United States Grand Prix.

Russell took his second consecutive pole in Austria despite having to lift on his final lap due to a yellow flag following an incident involving Max Verstappen. He converted the pole to a win (and retook second in the Drivers' Championship from Hamilton), fending off pressure from Verstappen who recovered from the qualifying incident to take second. Antonelli rounded out the podium, finishing 1.9 seconds behind Russell and three tenths behind Verstappen. During the race, multiple duels between both Ferraris was observed, Sainz retired on the pit straight after an electrical problem, and the Cadillacs retired early following overheating brake issues.

At the British Grand Prix, Hamilton took sprint pole position, though Antonelli passed him for the win. Antonelli built on this momentum into Grand Prix qualifying and took pole position, however he received wheelspin at the start and dropped behind the Ferrari cars of Leclerc and Hamilton. Leclerc led a majority of the race; during the closing stages, Antonelli, who was closing in on Leclerc, damaged the front-left wheel shield after running over a kerb. This hampered the car's ability to turn and he had to pit twice to fix the issue, before then attaining a five-second penalty for repeated track limits infringements. The race ended under safety car after Verstappen, who was running third, had to retire after a rear wing failure resulted in him spinning off into the gravel trap at Stowe. Leclerc won the race, his first British Grand Prix victory and first victory since the 2024 United States Grand Prix. Russell and Hamilton completed the podium at their home race with both drivers recovering from earlier setbacks; Russell from a slow puncture and Hamilton from a five-second penalty for a false start. Antonelli finished outside the points in fifteenth after the track limits penalty was added on to his race time. In addition to Verstappen, Alex Albon and Nico Hülkenberg also retired.

Antonelli started the Belgian Grand Prix from pole position, although Verstappen briefly overtook him on the opening lap before the Mercedes driver reclaimed the lead along the Kemmel Straight. Russell retired following an opening-lap collision with Hamilton, who was deemed responsible and received a five-second penalty. A virtual safety car brought out for gravel on the racing line allowed Leclerc to jump both Antonelli and Verstappen through the pit stops and take the lead, but Antonelli closed the gap and passed Leclerc on lap 34. He held off the Ferrari driver to claim his sixth victory of the season, with Verstappen completing the podium. Hamilton recovered from his penalty to finish fourth ahead of Piastri, while Isack Hadjar progressed from twenty-first on the grid to sixth. The result extended Antonelli's championship lead to 45 points over Hamilton and 50 over Russell.

The Hungarian Grand Prix saw Aston Martin bring no less than 16 updates to their car, with Fernando Alonso giving the team their first Q2 appearance of the season as a result. Norris edged out Hamilton by 0.012 seconds to take the seventeenth pole of his career, and become the first non-Mercedes driver to take pole in 2026. Both Hamilton and Antonelli would receive three-place grid penalties post-qualifying; Hamilton for impeding Oscar Piastri, and Antonelli for failing to slow sufficiently for yellow flags. Piastri moved into the lead on the opening lap after Norris ran wide at turn 2, and proceeded to lead the first half of the race. After Piastri's second stop, he was slowed by minor contact with the lapped car of Carlos Sainz Jr. and further delayed by other lapped cars, allowing Norris to extend his second stint and emerge ahead of Piastri after pitting on lap 40. Norris controlled the remainder of the race to claim his and McLaren's first victory of the season, while Piastri retired from second place with a gearbox failure, triggering a virtual safety car with 14 laps remaining. Ferrari pitted Hamilton under the virtual safety car, dropping him behind Verstappen and Antonelli, before a five-second penalty for speeding in the pit lane demoted him to fifth behind Leclerc. Verstappen and Antonelli completed the podium, with Hadjar finishing sixth and Russell recovering from stalling at the start to take seventh. Nico Hülkenberg finished ninth, scoring his first points of the season and first as an Audi driver. Antonelli extended his championship lead to 50 points over Hamilton and 59 over Russell, with Leclerc and Norris 81 and 91 points behind respectively heading into the summer break.

Following the summer break, the season resumed with the Dutch Grand Prix; it was the last to be hosted at Circuit Zandvoort, and the first and only to be a sprint event. Red Bull driver Isack Hadjar missed the event after sustaining a wrist injury during the summer break; Liam Lawson was promoted from Racing Bulls to replace him, and reserve driver Yuki Tsunoda was called up to drive for Racing Bulls. Russell won the sprint with a lights-to-flag drive from pole, ahead of Leclerc and Norris. Norris responded in qualifying for the Grand Prix, taking pole position by a tenth over Russell. The Grand Prix was interrupted by a lengthy red flag following a heavy crash for Verstappen at turn 14 on the opening lap, the Dutchman emerged unharmed but had to retire from his home race. Antonelli took the lead at the ensuing standing start when the race resumed; he led for a majority of the race, closely shadowed by Norris. On lap 54, Norris took advantage of Antonelli getting held up by Hamilton who was on an alternate strategy to pass him into turn 1, he then passed Hamilton later on the same lap and moved into the lead. Norris survived two further virtual safety car periods to take his second win in a row, with Antonelli finishing second and extending his championship lead to 59 points. Russell took the final spot on the podium after holding off the Ferraris of Hamilton and Leclerc, who finished fourth and fifth respectively.

Lando Norris at the Dutch Grand Prix where he claimed his second Grand Prix victory as reigning World Champion.

Alpine driver Pierre Gasly claimed his first career pole position in qualifying for the Italian Grand Prix ahead of Russell and Oscar Piastri, although Piastri received a three-place grid penalty for impeding Liam Lawson. Leclerc crashed heavily at the Parabolica on the second lap of the Grand Prix, bringing out the red flag; he emerged unharmed but his car was completely destroyed. On the subsequent restart, Russell, who had taken the lead from Gasly before the red flag, led away but was soon hounded by Verstappen. Antonelli, who started down the order after taking a grid penalty for exceeding his quota of power unit elements, worked his way through the field and caught up to the leading pair. During a virtual safety car period caused by Lance Stroll stopping on track with a hydraulic failure, Russell chose to stay out while Antonelli and Verstappen pitted for fresh tyres. Antonelli, making use of the substantial tyre offset, caught and passed his teammate in the closing stages of the race to win from nineteenth on the grid. Antonelli became the first driver since John Watson at the 1983 United States Grand Prix West to win from a starting position this low, and the first Italian driver to win the Italian Grand Prix since Ludovico Scarfiotti sixty years prior. Verstappen completed the podium ahead of the McLaren duo of Norris and Piastri.

Norris claimed pole position for the inaugural running of the Spanish Grand Prix at the new Madring circuit, edging out Antonelli by 0.011 seconds. He comfortably controlled the initial stages of the race, but lost out to both Antonelli and Verstappen after a poorly-timed virtual safety car and a slow pit stop. Charles Leclerc led for a majority of the race by electing to stay out during the virtual safety car and doing a long stint on hard tyres, before pitting with 10 laps left to cover Russell. Antonelli took over the lead and won the race ahead of Verstappen, who held off Norris.

Russell claimed pole by 0.837 seconds for the Azerbaijan Grand Prix and ended up leading the whole race to claim his first career Grand Slam, albeit it came down to the wire between him Verstappen, finishing with a margin of 0.196 seconds, the closest margin between first and second since the 2002 United States Grand Prix. From the moment the race started the Red Bull showed evident pace, as Verstappen and Hadjar quickly jumped from eighth and fourth to fourth and third, respectively. Hadjar would cede position to Verstappen, believing that he would have better pace to overtake Piastri for second. This would not occur until the first safety car restart, being caused by Albon crashing into the barriers. The safety car would quickly be redeployed after an incident involving Colapinto, Gasly, and Norris at turn 1, which would take all three out of the race. After the second restart, Verstappen and Russell would quickly accelerate away from the rest of the field. Piastri would lock up into turn 1 on lap 40, dropping back to fourteenth and conceding the final podium position to Hadjar. While there would be drama involving Bottas on the last lap, the podium would remain as Russell from Verstappen from Hadjar. This was Red Bull's first double podium since the 2024 Chinese Grand Prix. Antonelli, having qualified sixteenth after an incident, would maintain a 66 point championship lead after finishing fifth.

=== Closing rounds ===
Verstappen secured his and Red Bull's first pole position of the season at the Bahrain Grand Prix in Malaysia, ahead of Hamilton and teammate Hadjar. It was the season's first pole position for a car not powered by a Mercedes engine. Hadjar's five-place grid penalty for taking a new internal combustion engine dropped him to eighth, promoting championship leader Antonelli to third alongside Leclerc on the second row. Following heavy rain and two delays to the start, Verstappen recovered from losing the lead at the start to take his first victory of the season, ahead of Antonelli and Hamilton. The victory was the first for a Ford-powered car since the 2003 Brazilian Grand Prix. Hamilton fell to 18th after starting on slick tyres on the wet circuit, but recovered to secure third by passing Hadjar after the final safety-car restart; Leclerc also passed Hadjar to finish fourth. Russell retired while running third during the late safety-car period with a power-unit problem, allowing Antonelli to extend his championship lead over his teammate to 84 points with seven rounds remaining.

Verstappen dominated the sprint race at the Singapore Grand Prix from pole position. The sprint was delayed once again due to inclement weather. After taking the lead, Russell crashed out of the sprint, which was held in damp track conditions, with both Ferraris of Hamilton and Leclerc completing the podium. The McLarens spun while attacking each other on the final lap, which led to Norris and Piastri both spinning; a compromised Norris, who had been fighting for fourth, continued on while Piastri met the wall and retired on the spot. Verstappen dominated the Grand Prix to secure his first victory at the Marina Bay Street Circuit, and his second consecutive victory of the season.

Antonelli had a chance to secure his maiden Drivers' Championship at the United States Grand Prix. He would be able to do so by winning the race with Russell finishing in ninth or below. Despite winning the race from pole position, he was unable to do so as Russell finished eighth, leaving him two points away from actually winning the championship. Leclerc finished second and Verstappen finished third but the latter was eliminated from championship contention for the first time since 2020.

Hamilton qualified in pole position at the Mexico City Grand Prix, his first since the 2023 Hungarian Grand Prix. However later in the race, Verstappen would take the lead and victory, followed by Hamilton and Antonelli. Antonelli's podium finish secured him the Drivers' Championship, becoming the youngest world champion at 20 years and 68 days of age.

During a wet qualifying session, Lando Norris took pole position at the São Paulo Grand Prix. During the race, he was briefly passed by Antonelli but the latter made a mistake into turn one that allowed Norris to obtain the lead of the race, which led to McLaren's third victory of the season. The podium was rounded off by Verstappen and Isack Hadjar. At the same time, Mercedes secured their ninth Constructors' Championship and their first since 2021.

Antonelli set the fastest qualifying time for the Las Vegas Grand Prix, but a five-place penalty for exceeding his allocation of power unit components dropped him to sixth and promoted Verstappen to pole position. Verstappen repeatedly exchanged the lead with Russell and Antonelli as slipstreaming kept the leading cars closely grouped. A collision between Pérez and Rafael Câmara triggered a safety car period on lap 19, during which Lindblad spun out. Hadjar subsequently dropped out of contention following a front-wing failure, while Leclerc received a ten-second penalty after colliding with Hamilton and spinning his teammate. Russell's challenge ended when he locked up and hit the barrier while attempting to pass Antonelli in the closing laps, dropping to ninth. Antonelli then fell from second to fourth with a late issue, allowing Verstappen to win by 0.639 seconds over Norris, with Piastri completing the podium after recovering from 17th on the grid. Gasly and Colapinto finished fifth and sixth for Alpine, ahead of Hamilton and Sainz, with Russell and Leclerc completing the points-scoring positions.

== Results and standings ==
=== Grands Prix ===
Round	Grand Prix (Note: The Chinese, Miami, Canadian, British, Dutch and Singapore Grands Prix feature the sprint format.)	Pole position	Fastest lap	Winning driver	Winning constructor	Report
1	(Australia) Australian Grand Prix	(United Kingdom) George Russell	(Netherlands) Max Verstappen	(United Kingdom) George Russell	(Germany) Mercedes	Report
2	(China) Chinese Grand Prix	(Italy) Kimi Antonelli	(Italy) Kimi Antonelli	(Italy) Kimi Antonelli	(Germany) Mercedes	Report
3	(Japan) Japanese Grand Prix	(Italy) Kimi Antonelli	(Italy) Kimi Antonelli	(Italy) Kimi Antonelli	(Germany) Mercedes	Report
4	(United States) Miami Grand Prix	(Italy) Kimi Antonelli	(United Kingdom) Lando Norris	(Italy) Kimi Antonelli	(Germany) Mercedes	Report
5	(Canada) Canadian Grand Prix	(United Kingdom) George Russell	(Italy) Kimi Antonelli	(Italy) Kimi Antonelli	(Germany) Mercedes	Report
6	Monaco Grand Prix	(Italy) Kimi Antonelli	(Italy) Kimi Antonelli	(Italy) Kimi Antonelli	(Germany) Mercedes	Report
7	(Spain) Barcelona-Catalunya Grand Prix	(United Kingdom) George Russell	(United Kingdom) Lewis Hamilton	(United Kingdom) Lewis Hamilton	(Italy) Ferrari	Report
8	(Austria) Austrian Grand Prix	(United Kingdom) George Russell	(Italy) Kimi Antonelli	(United Kingdom) George Russell	(Germany) Mercedes	Report
9	(United Kingdom) British Grand Prix	(Italy) Kimi Antonelli	(Italy) Kimi Antonelli	(Monaco) Charles Leclerc	(Italy) Ferrari	Report
10	(Belgium) Belgian Grand Prix	(Italy) Kimi Antonelli	(United Kingdom) Lando Norris	(Italy) Kimi Antonelli	(Germany) Mercedes	Report
11	(Hungary) Hungarian Grand Prix	(United Kingdom) Lando Norris	(Monaco) Charles Leclerc	(United Kingdom) Lando Norris	(United Kingdom) McLaren-Mercedes	Report
12	(Netherlands) Dutch Grand Prix	(United Kingdom) Lando Norris	(Monaco) Charles Leclerc	(United Kingdom) Lando Norris	(United Kingdom) McLaren-Mercedes	Report
13	(Italy) Italian Grand Prix	(France) Pierre Gasly	(Italy) Kimi Antonelli	(Italy) Kimi Antonelli	(Germany) Mercedes	Report
14	(Spain) Spanish Grand Prix	(United Kingdom) Lando Norris	(United Kingdom) George Russell	(Italy) Kimi Antonelli	(Germany) Mercedes	Report
15	Azerbaijan Grand Prix	(United Kingdom) George Russell	(United Kingdom) George Russell	(United Kingdom) George Russell	(Germany) Mercedes	Report
16	Bahrain Grand Prix in Malaysia	(Netherlands) Max Verstappen	(Netherlands) Max Verstappen	(Netherlands) Max Verstappen	(Austria) Red Bull Racing-Red Bull Ford	Report
17	Singapore Grand Prix	(Netherlands) Max Verstappen	(Monaco) Charles Leclerc	(Netherlands) Max Verstappen	(Austria) Red Bull Racing-Red Bull Ford	Report
18	United States Grand Prix	(Italy) Kimi Antonelli	(Monaco) Charles Leclerc	(Italy) Kimi Antonelli	(Germany) Mercedes	Report
19	Mexico City Grand Prix	(United Kingdom) Lewis Hamilton	(United Kingdom) Lewis Hamilton	(Netherlands) Max Verstappen	(Austria) Red Bull Racing-Red Bull Ford	Report
20	(Brazil) São Paulo Grand Prix	(United Kingdom) Lando Norris	(Italy) Kimi Antonelli	(United Kingdom) Lando Norris	(United Kingdom) McLaren-Mercedes	Report
21	(United States) Las Vegas Grand Prix	(Netherlands) Max Verstappen (Note: Kimi Antonelli set the fastest time in qualifying, but received a five-place grid penalty for exceeding his quota of internal combustion engine components. Max Verstappen was promoted to pole position in his place.)	(New Zealand) Liam Lawson	(Netherlands) Max Verstappen	(Austria) Red Bull Racing-Red Bull Ford	Report
22	Qatar Grand Prix					Report
23	(United Arab Emirates) Abu Dhabi Grand Prix					Report

=== Scoring system ===
Points are awarded to the top ten classified drivers in the race and to the top eight finishers in the sprint. (Note: In the event of a race or sprint ending prematurely, the number of points-paying positions may be reduced, depending on how much of the race or sprint has been completed.) In the case of a tie on points, a countback system is used where the driver with the most Grand Prix wins is ranked higher. If the number of wins is identical, the number of second places is considered, and so on. Points are awarded using the following system:

Position	1st	2nd	3rd	4th	5th	6th	7th	8th	9th	10th
Race	25	18	15	12	10	8	6	4	2	1
Sprint	8	7	6	5	4	3	2	1		

=== World Drivers' Championship standings ===
Pos.	Driver	AUS (Australia)	CHN (China)	JPN (Japan)	MIA (United States)	CAN (Canada)	MON (Monaco)	BCN (Spain)	AUT (Austria)	GBR (United Kingdom)	BEL (Belgium)	HUN (Hungary)	NED (Netherlands)	ITA (Italy)	ESP (Spain)	AZE (Azerbaijan)	BHR (Malaysia)	SIN (Singapore)	USA (United States)	MXC (Mexico)	SAP (Brazil)	LVG (United States)	QAT (Qatar)	ABU (United Arab Emirates)	Points
1	(Italy) Kimi Antonelli	2	1^{5 P F}	1^{P}^{F}	1^{6 P}	1^{3 F}	1^{P}^{F}	16†	3^{F}	15^{1 P F}	1^{P}	3	2^{4}	1^{F}	1	5	2	3^{4}	1^{P}	3	5^{F}	4			402
2	(Netherlands) Max Verstappen	6^{F}	Ret	8	5^{5}	3^{7}	Ret	4	2	20†^{6}	3	2	Ret^{6}	3	2	2	1^{P}^{F}	1^{1 P}	3	1	2	1^{P}			304
3	(United Kingdom) Lewis Hamilton	4	3^{3}	6	6^{7}	2^{6}	2	1^{F}	5	3^{2}	4	5	4^{7}	6	Ret	6	3	6^{2}	4	2^{P}^{F}	9	7			267
4	(United Kingdom) George Russell	1^{P}	2^{1}	4	4^{4}	Ret^{1 P}	12	2^{P}	1^{P}	2^{4}	Ret	7	3^{1}	2	5^{F}	1^{P}^{F}	20†	9	8	6	4	9			264
5	(United Kingdom) Lando Norris	5	DNS^{4}	5	2^{1 F}	Ret^{2}	Ret	3	7	4^{3}	7^{F}	1^{P}	1^{3 P}	4	3^{P}	Ret	9	4^{8}	5	5	1^{P}	2			264
6	(Monaco) Charles Leclerc	3	4^{2}	3	8^{3}	4^{5}	Ret	15†	8	1^{5}	2	4^{F}	5^{2 F}	Ret	4	4	4	2^{3 F}	2^{F}	4	8	10			250
7	(Australia) Oscar Piastri	DNS	DNS^{6}	2	3^{2}	11^{4}	4	5	4	11^{7}	5	Ret	6^{5}	5	8	13	6	5	7	13	6	3			167
8	(France) Isack Hadjar	Ret	8	12	Ret	5	3	6	6	5	6	6				3	5	10	6	9	3	15			122
9	(New Zealand) Liam Lawson	13	7^{7}	9	Ret	7	5	8	9	6^{8}	12	8	7	14	6	12	7	7^{5}	9	7	7	14^{F}			89
10	(France) Pierre Gasly	10	6	7	Ret^{8}	8	7	7	13	10	11	12	10^{8}	7^{P}	12	Ret	16	11	10	17	14	5			52
11	(United Kingdom) Arvid Lindblad	8	12	14	14	DNS^{8}	6	9	10	7	9	10	12	8	9	7	10	15	12	Ret	11	Ret			38
12	(Argentina) Franco Colapinto	14	10	16	7	6	14	10	15	9	10	15	14	9	7	Ret	13	Ret	Ret	15	13	6			35
13	(United Kingdom) Oliver Bearman	7	5^{8}	Ret	11	10	Ret	17†	14	12	14	19	Ret	15	16	9	14	12^{6}	Ret	Ret	17	13			23
14	(Brazil) Gabriel Bortoleto	9	DNS	13	12	13	11	11	11	8	8	11	13	11	13	15	18	Ret	13	8	16	12			14
15	(Germany) Nico Hülkenberg	DNS	11	11	Ret	12	13	Ret	12	Ret	13	9	8	12	10	11	11	8^{7}	11	14	10	11			14
16	(Spain) Carlos Sainz Jr.	15	9	15	9	9	16†	12	Ret	17	16	18	16	13	Ret	10	17	14	18	12	19	8			11
17	(France) Esteban Ocon	11	14	10	13	14	9	13	16	13	17	16	Ret	16	11	8	15	13	14	WD					7
18	(Spain) Fernando Alonso	Ret	Ret	18	15	Ret	10	Ret	18	18	19	14	9	Ret	17	Ret	8	16	16	Ret	12	19†			7
19	(Thailand) Alexander Albon	12	DNS	20	10	Ret	8	NC	17	Ret	15	17	17†	17	15	Ret	Ret	18†	17	11	15	DNS			5
20	(Japan) Yuki Tsunoda												11	10	14										1
21	(Japan) Ryo Hirakawa																			10					1
22	(Canada) Lance Stroll	NC	Ret	Ret	17	15	Ret	Ret	Ret	19	Ret	13	Ret	Ret	Ret	Ret	12	Ret	15	Ret	Ret	17			0
23	(Finland) Valtteri Bottas	Ret	13	19	18	16	Ret	Ret	Ret	16	18	Ret	Ret	19	18	16†	Ret	19	Ret	Ret	DNS	18			0
24	(Mexico) Sergio Pérez	16	15	17	16	Ret	15	14	Ret	14	Ret	Ret	15	18	Ret	14	19	17	19	16	18	Ret			0
25	(Brazil) Rafael Câmara																				20	16			0
Pos.	Driver	AUS (Australia)	CHN (China)	JPN (Japan)	MIA (United States)	CAN (Canada)	MON (Monaco)	BCN (Spain)	AUT (Austria)	GBR (United Kingdom)	BEL (Belgium)	HUN (Hungary)	NED (Netherlands)	ITA (Italy)	ESP (Spain)	AZE (Azerbaijan)	BHR (Malaysia)	SIN (Singapore)	USA (United States)	MXC (Mexico)	SAP (Brazil)	LVG (United States)	QAT (Qatar)	ABU (United Arab Emirates)	Points

Key
Colour	Result
Gold	Winner
Silver	Second place
Bronze	Third place
Green	Other points position
Blue	Other classified position
Blue	Not classified, finished (NC)
Purple	Not classified, retired (Ret)
Red	Did not qualify (DNQ)
Black	Disqualified (DSQ)
White	Did not start (DNS)
White	Race cancelled (C)
Blank	Did not practice (DNP)
Blank	Excluded (EX)
Blank	Did not arrive (DNA)
Blank	Withdrawn (WD)
Blank	Did not enter (empty cell)
Annotation	Meaning
P	Pole position
F	Fastest lap
Superscript number	Points-scoring position in sprint

Notes:

- † – Driver did not finish the Grand Prix, but was classified as he completed more than 90% of the race distance.

=== World Constructors' Championship standings ===
Pos.	Constructor	AUS (Australia)	CHN (China)	JPN (Japan)	MIA (United States)	CAN (Canada)	MON (Monaco)	BCN (Spain)	AUT (Austria)	GBR (United Kingdom)	BEL (Belgium)	HUN (Hungary)	NED (Netherlands)	ITA (Italy)	ESP (Spain)	AZE (Azerbaijan)	BHR (Malaysia)	SIN (Singapore)	USA (United States)	MXC (Mexico)	SAP (Brazil)	LVG (United States)	QAT (Qatar)	ABU (United Arab Emirates)	Points
1	(Germany) Mercedes	1^{P}	1^{5 P F}	1^{P}^{F}	1^{6 P}	1^{3 F}	1^{P}^{F}	2^{P}	1^{P}	2^{4}	1^{P}	3	2^{4}	1^{F}	1	1^{P}^{F}	2	3^{4}	1^{P}	3	4	4			666
1	(Germany) Mercedes	2	2^{1}	4	4^{4}	Ret^{1 P}	12	16†	3^{F}	15^{1 P F}	Ret	7	3^{1}	2	5^{F}	5	20†	9	8	6	5^{F}	9			666
2	(Italy) Ferrari	3	3^{3}	3	6^{7}	2^{6}	2	1^{F}	5	1^{5}	2	4^{F}	4^{7}	6	4	4	3	2^{3 F}	2^{F}	2^{P}^{F}	8	7			517
2	(Italy) Ferrari	4	4^{2}	6	8^{3}	4^{5}	Ret	15†	8	3^{2}	4	5	5^{2 F}	Ret	Ret	6	4	6^{2}	4	4	9	10			517
3	(Austria) Red Bull Racing-Red Bull Ford	6^{F}	8	8	5^{5}	3^{7}	3	4	2	5	3	2	7	3	2	2	1^{P}^{F}	1^{1 P}	3	1	2	1^{P}			440
3	(Austria) Red Bull Racing-Red Bull Ford	Ret	Ret	12	Ret	5	Ret	6	6	20†^{6}	6	6	Ret^{6}	14	6	3	5	10	6	9	3	15			440
4	(United Kingdom) McLaren-Mercedes	5	DNS^{4}	2	2^{1 F}	11^{4}	4	3	4	4^{3}	5	1^{P}	1^{3 P}	4	3^{P}	13	6	4^{8}	5	5	1^{P}	2			431
4	(United Kingdom) McLaren-Mercedes	DNS	DNS^{6}	5	3^{2}	Ret^{2}	Ret	5	7	11^{7}	7^{F}	Ret	6^{5}	5	8	Ret	9	5	7	13	6	3			431
5	(Italy) Racing Bulls-Red Bull Ford	8	7^{7}	9	14	7	5	8	9	6^{8}	9	8	11	8	9	7	7	7^{5}	9	7	7	14^{F}			114
5	(Italy) Racing Bulls-Red Bull Ford	13	12	14	Ret	DNS^{8}	6	9	10	7	12	10	12	10	14	12	10	15	12	Ret	11	Ret			114
6	(France) Alpine-Mercedes	10	6	7	7	6	7	7	13	9	10	12	10^{8}	7^{P}	7	Ret	13	11	10	15	13	5			87
6	(France) Alpine-Mercedes	14	10	16	Ret^{8}	8	14	10	15	10	11	15	14	9	12	Ret	16	Ret	Ret	17	14	6			87
7	(United States) Haas-Ferrari	7	5^{8}	10	11	10	9	13	14	12	14	16	Ret	15	11	8	14	12^{6}	14	10	17	13			31
7	(United States) Haas-Ferrari	11	14	Ret	13	14	Ret	17†	16	13	17	19	Ret	16	16	9	15	13	Ret	Ret	20	16			31
8	(Germany) Audi	9	11	11	12	12	11	11	11	8	8	9	8	11	10	11	11	8^{7}	11	8	10	11			28
8	(Germany) Audi	DNS	DNS	13	Ret	13	13	Ret	12	Ret	13	11	13	12	13	15	18	Ret	13	14	16	12			28
9	(United Kingdom) Atlassian Williams-Mercedes	12	9	15	9	9	8	12	17	17	15	17	16	13	15	10	17	14	17	11	15	8			16
9	(United Kingdom) Atlassian Williams-Mercedes	15	DNS	20	10	Ret	16†	NC	Ret	Ret	16	18	17†	17	Ret	Ret	Ret	18†	18	12	19	DNS			16
10	(United Kingdom) Aston Martin Aramco-Honda	NC	Ret	18	15	15	10	Ret	18	18	19	13	9	Ret	17	Ret	8	16	15	Ret	12	17			7
10	(United Kingdom) Aston Martin Aramco-Honda	Ret	Ret	Ret	17	Ret	Ret	Ret	Ret	19	Ret	14	Ret	Ret	Ret	Ret	12	Ret	16	Ret	Ret	19†			7
11	(United States) Cadillac-Ferrari	16	13	17	16	16	15	14	Ret	14	18	Ret	15	18	18	14	19	17	19	16	18	18			0
11	(United States) Cadillac-Ferrari	Ret	15	19	18	Ret	Ret	Ret	Ret	16	Ret	Ret	Ret	19	Ret	16†	Ret	19	Ret	Ret	DNS	Ret			0
Pos.	Constructor	AUS (Australia)	CHN (China)	JPN (Japan)	MIA (United States)	CAN (Canada)	MON (Monaco)	BCN (Spain)	AUT (Austria)	GBR (United Kingdom)	BEL (Belgium)	HUN (Hungary)	NED (Netherlands)	ITA (Italy)	ESP (Spain)	AZE (Azerbaijan)	BHR (Malaysia)	SIN (Singapore)	USA (United States)	MXC (Mexico)	SAP (Brazil)	LVG (United States)	QAT (Qatar)	ABU (United Arab Emirates)	Points

Key
Colour	Result
Gold	Winner
Silver	Second place
Bronze	Third place
Green	Other points position
Blue	Other classified position
Blue	Not classified, finished (NC)
Purple	Not classified, retired (Ret)
Red	Did not qualify (DNQ)
Black	Disqualified (DSQ)
White	Did not start (DNS)
White	Race cancelled (C)
Blank	Did not practice (DNP)
Blank	Excluded (EX)
Blank	Did not arrive (DNA)
Blank	Withdrawn (WD)
Blank	Did not enter (empty cell)
Annotation	Meaning
P	Pole position
F	Fastest lap
Superscript number	Points-scoring position in sprint

Notes:

- † – Driver did not finish the Grand Prix, but was classified as he completed more than 90% of the race distance.
- Rows are not related to the drivers: within each constructor, individual Grand Prix standings are sorted purely based on the final classification in the race (not by total points scored in the event, which includes points awarded for the sprint).
