= 2026 Barcelona-Catalunya Grand Prix =

Formula One motor race

Race 7 of 23 (Note: At the time of the event Formula One planned to hold twenty-two Grands Prix.) in the 2026 Formula One World Championship
← Previous race	Next race →
- Layout of the Circuit de Barcelona-Catalunya, Spain

Race details
- Date: 14 June 2026
- Official name: Formula 1 MSC Cruises Gran Premio de Barcelona-Catalunya 2026
- Location: Circuit de Barcelona-Catalunya, Montmeló, Spain
- Course: Permanent racing facility
- Course length: 4.657 km (2.894 miles)
- Distance: 66 laps, 307.236 km (190.908 miles)
- Weather: Sunny. Max. ambient temp. 31.5°C, max. track temp. 52.3°C.
- Attendance: 301,273

Pole position
Driver	(United Kingdom) George Russell	Mercedes
- Time: 1:14.679

Fastest lap
Driver	(United Kingdom) Lewis Hamilton	Ferrari
- Time: 1:20.122 on lap 44

Podium
First	(United Kingdom) Lewis Hamilton	Ferrari
Second	(United Kingdom) George Russell	Mercedes
Third	(United Kingdom) Lando Norris	McLaren-Mercedes

The 2026 Barcelona-Catalunya Grand Prix (officially known as the Formula 1 MSC Cruises Gran Premio de Barcelona-Catalunya 2026) was a Formula One motor race held on 14 June 2026 at the Circuit de Barcelona-Catalunya in Montmeló, Spain. It was the seventh round of the 2026 Formula One World Championship and the first running of the Barcelona-Catalunya Grand Prix.

George Russell (Mercedes) secured pole position for the race and was leading until late on when Lewis Hamilton (Ferrari) passed him on an alternate three-stop strategy, which was further optimised with the help of a well-timed virtual safety car. Hamilton won the Grand Prix, taking his first victory for Ferrari, his first Grand Prix win since the 2024 Belgian Grand Prix. At 41, he became the oldest Formula One Grand Prix winner since Jack Brabham at the 1970 South African Grand Prix. Russell finished second, with Lando Norris (McLaren) third, producing the first all-British Formula One podium since the 1968 United States Grand Prix. Championship leader Kimi Antonelli retired late in the race, reducing his lead over Hamilton in the Drivers' Championship to 41 points.

== Background ==
The Circuit de Barcelona-Catalunya in Montmeló played host to Formula One for the 36th time, having previously held thirty-five editions of the Spanish Grand Prix, across the weekend of 12–14 June. It was the seventh round of the 2026 Formula One World Championship and the first running of the Barcelona-Catalunya Grand Prix.

The Circuit de Barcelona-Catalunya was originally scheduled to host Spanish Grand Prix in 2026. However, Spain's capital city, Madrid, was nominated as a new host of Formula One, with the Madring scheduled to make its debut in 2026 and therefore taking the Spanish Grand Prix name. As a result, the circuit's 2026 event was renamed to the Barcelona-Catalunya Grand Prix. It will be the first time that Spain hosted two Grand Prix since the 2012 season, when Spain played host to the Spanish Grand Prix at the Circuit de Barcelona-Catalunya and the European Grand Prix at the Valencia Street Circuit.

=== Championship standings before the race ===
Going into the weekend, Kimi Antonelli led the Drivers' Championship with 156 points, 66 points ahead of Lewis Hamilton in second, and 68 ahead of teammate George Russell in third. Mercedes, with 244 points, led the Constructors' Championship from Ferrari and McLaren, who were second and third with 165 and 118 points, respectively.

=== Entrants ===
The drivers and teams were the same as the season entry list with no additional stand-in drivers for the race.

During the first practice session, six teams fielded alternate drivers who had not raced in more than two Grands Prix, as required by the Formula One regulations:

- Colton Herta for Cadillac in place of Sergio Pérez, making his Formula One practice debut.
- Leonardo Fornaroli for McLaren in place of Lando Norris, making his Formula One practice debut.
- Frederik Vesti for Mercedes in place of Kimi Antonelli.
- Dino Beganovic for Ferrari in place of Lewis Hamilton.
- Ayumu Iwasa for Red Bull in place of Isack Hadjar.
- Paul Aron for Audi in place of Nico Hülkenberg.

Luke Browning was initially due to take part in the first practice session for Williams in place of Alexander Albon, but he was not able to run due to an electrical failure on his car.

=== Tyre choices ===
Tyre supplier Pirelli brought the C2, C3 and C4 tyre compounds, designated hard, medium and soft, respectively, for teams to use at the event. This was one step softer than the compounds used at the circuit in 2025.

== Practice ==
Three free practice sessions were held for the event. The first free practice session was held on 12 June 2026, at 13:30 local time (UTC+2), and was topped by George Russell (Mercedes) ahead of Oscar Piastri (McLaren) and Charles Leclerc (Ferrari). The second free practice session was held on the same day, at 17:00 local time, and was topped by Lando Norris (McLaren) ahead of Russell and Piastri. The third free practice session was held on 13 June 2026, at 12:30 local time, and was topped by Russell ahead of Piastri and Leclerc. A red flag was observed due to Valtteri Bottas (Cadillac) getting stuck in a gravel trap at turn 10, following a brake failure.

== Qualifying ==
Qualifying was held on 13 June 2026, at 16:00 local time (UTC+2), and determined the starting grid order for the race.

=== Qualifying report ===
George Russell (Mercedes) entered qualifying as one of the leading contenders for pole position, having topped both the first and third practice sessions earlier in the weekend. The session was held in warm conditions, with low grip levels and tyre degradation expected to be significant factors. Valtteri Bottas (Cadillac) was the first driver to leave the pit lane in Q1 (the opening segment of qualifying), while Carlos Sainz Jr. (Williams) set the early benchmark before the leading teams began their first attempts. Lewis Hamilton (Ferrari) set the fastest time in Q1, ahead of Russell and Charles Leclerc in the second Ferrari. Hamilton was shown the black-and-white flag during the segment for driving unnecessarily slowly on a warm-up lap, while Lance Stroll (Aston Martin) briefly caused yellow flags after running through the gravel. In the final runs, Sainz improved to sixteenth and pushed Esteban Ocon (Haas) into the elimination zone. Ocon was knocked out in seventeenth place, ahead of Alexander Albon (Williams), the two Cadillacs of Sergio Pérez and Bottas, and the Aston Martins of Stroll and Fernando Alonso. It was the first time since the 2024 British Grand Prix that Stroll outqualified Alonso, leaving Aston Martin to occupy the final row of the grid.

Q2 (the second segment) began slowly, with several teams delaying their first runs. Nico Hülkenberg (Audi) set the first representative time before Max Verstappen (Red Bull), Leclerc and Russell moved to the top of the order. Russell eventually set the fastest lap of the segment, finishing ahead of Leclerc and championship leader Kimi Antonelli. Both McLaren drivers were at risk during the middle of the session after initially running used tyres, with Lando Norris reporting rear locking, but Norris and Oscar Piastri improved on fresh tyres to reach Q3 (the final qualifying segment). Arvid Lindblad (Racing Bulls) missed out on Q3 in eleventh place after aborting his final Q2 run, ahead of Gabriel Bortoleto in the second Audi. The two Alpine drivers were also eliminated, with Franco Colapinto qualifying thirteenth ahead of Pierre Gasly, with Oliver Bearman (Haas) and Sainz completed the group of drivers eliminated in Q2. Hülkenberg progressed to Q3 and qualified ninth for Audi, between Liam Lawson and Leclerc in the final classification.

The final segment was interrupted early when Leclerc lost control of his Ferrari at turn 4, ran through the gravel and crashed into the barriers, bringing out the red flag. At the time of the stoppage, only Piastri and Verstappen had completed timed laps, with Piastri provisionally the fastest ahead of Verstappen. Leclerc was unable to continue and did not set a Q3 time. When Q3 resumed with around eight minutes remaining, Russell moved to provisional pole, narrowly ahead of Piastri. Antonelli improved on his final run and briefly moved ahead of his teammate, but Russell responded to secure pole position. Hamilton then produced a late lap to qualify second behind Russell, which demoted Antonelli to third. Norris qualified fourth for McLaren behind Antonelli, with Verstappen fifth and Isack Hadjar sixth for Red Bull. Piastri finished seventh ahead of Lawson and Hülkenberg, while Leclerc was classified tenth after his crash.

Russell's pole was his third of the season, while Mercedes took pole position for the seventh consecutive Grand Prix to open the 2026 season. Antonelli qualified off the front row for the first time in the season.

=== Qualifying classification ===
Pos.	No.	Driver	Constructor	Qualifying times			Final grid
Pos.	No.	Driver	Constructor	Q1	Q2	Q3	Final grid
1	63	(United Kingdom) George Russell	Mercedes	1:15.717	1:15.228	1:14.679	1
2	44	(United Kingdom) Lewis Hamilton	Ferrari	1:15.625	1:15.418	1:14.743	2
3	12	(Italy) Kimi Antonelli	Mercedes	1:15.977	1:15.295	1:14.998	3
4	1	(United Kingdom) Lando Norris	McLaren-Mercedes	1:16.287	1:15.361	1:15.001	4
5	3	(Netherlands) Max Verstappen	Red Bull Racing-Red Bull Ford	1:16.352	1:15.484	1:15.021	5
6	6	(France) Isack Hadjar	Red Bull Racing-Red Bull Ford	1:16.427	1:15.754	1:15.077	6
7	81	(Australia) Oscar Piastri	McLaren-Mercedes	1:16.138	1:15.518	1:15.090	7
8	30	(New Zealand) Liam Lawson	Racing Bulls-Red Bull Ford	1:16.673	1:15.585	1:16.542	8
9	27	(Germany) Nico Hülkenberg	Audi	1:16.066	1:15.768	1:16.657	9
10	16	(Monaco) Charles Leclerc	Ferrari	1:15.964	1:15.281	No time	10
11	41	(United Kingdom) Arvid Lindblad	Racing Bulls-Red Bull Ford	1:16.425	1:15.840	N/A	11
12	5	(Brazil) Gabriel Bortoleto	Audi	1:16.616	1:16.001	N/A	12
13	43	(Argentina) Franco Colapinto	Alpine-Mercedes	1:16.590	1:16.191	N/A	13
14	10	(France) Pierre Gasly	Alpine-Mercedes	1:16.599	1:16.261	N/A	14
15	87	(United Kingdom) Oliver Bearman	Haas-Ferrari	1:16.571	1:16.389	N/A	15
16	55	(Spain) Carlos Sainz Jr.	Atlassian Williams-Mercedes	1:16.881	1:17.827	N/A	16
17	31	(France) Esteban Ocon	Haas-Ferrari	1:17.073	N/A	N/A	17
18	23	(Thailand) Alexander Albon	Atlassian Williams-Mercedes	1:17.424	N/A	N/A	18
19	11	(Mexico) Sergio Pérez	Cadillac-Ferrari	1:17.545	N/A	N/A	19
20	77	(Finland) Valtteri Bottas	Cadillac-Ferrari	1:17.757	N/A	N/A	20
21	18	(Canada) Lance Stroll	Aston Martin Aramco-Honda	1:18.758	N/A	N/A	21
22	14	(Spain) Fernando Alonso	Aston Martin Aramco-Honda	1:18.815	N/A	N/A	PL^{a}
107% time: 1:20.918

Notes

- ^a – Fernando Alonso qualified 22nd, but was required to start the race from the pit lane as his car was modified during parc fermé conditions.

== Race ==
The race was held on 14 June 2026, at 15:00 local time (UTC+2), and was run for 66 laps.

=== Race report ===
Fernando Alonso was required to start from the pit lane after Aston Martin changed power-unit elements on his car under parc fermé conditions. The change came after Alonso had qualified at the rear of the field, with teammate Lance Stroll also starting near the back of the grid. The race was held in hot conditions, with track temperatures reported to be above 50 °C (122 °F) before the formation lap. Tyre degradation was expected to be a major factor, partly because Pirelli had selected softer compounds than those used at the previous year's race. Most of the field (George Russell, championship leader Kimi Antonelli, Lando Norris, Oscar Piastri, Isack Hadjar, Liam Lawson, Arvid Lindblad, Gabriel Bortoleto, Oliver Bearman, Charles Leclerc, Stroll and Alexander Albon) started on the medium compound. Lewis Hamilton, Max Verstappen, Nico Hülkenberg, Franco Colapinto, Carlos Sainz Jr., Esteban Ocon and Sergio Pérez started on soft tyres, while Aston Martin chose the hard compound for both Alonso and Stroll.

At the start, Russell defended the lead from Hamilton into the first corner, Antonelli, Norris and Verstappen held third, fourth and fifth, respectively. Leclerc, who had started tenth after crashing during qualifying, made immediate progress and moved up the order during the opening laps. By contrast, Hadjar made a poor start from sixth and fell outside the top ten, while Bortoleto also lost ground from the midfield. Russell opened a lead of around three seconds in the first stint, but the pace of the leading cars began to fall as tyre degradation increased. Norris reported that his car was sliding on the medium tyres, while Verstappen also complained about tyre behaviour on the soft compound. The first retirement came on lap 6, when Stroll was instructed to return to the pits with a gearbox problem. Shortly afterwards, Leclerc continued his recovery drive by passing Piastri into the top six.

The leading drivers began their first round of pit stops around lap 12. Hamilton was the first of the front-runners to stop, switching from soft to hard tyres, and Mercedes responded by stopping Russell one lap later. Russell retained track position, while Antonelli, Norris and Verstappen also stopped during the same phase of the race. Lawson lost time during this phase after a slow pit stop, while Leclerc extended his opening stint before pitting on lap 16. The midfield order continued to change after the first pit stop sequence. Hadjar recovered from his poor start with several overtakes, eventually re-entering the points positions. Alpine used team orders to move Pierre Gasly ahead of Colapinto, with Colapinto later saying that he had no complaint about the decision after crossing the line eighth. Valtteri Bottas became the second retirement when Cadillac called him into the garage as a precaution, while Hülkenberg later retired his Audi while running in the lower points battle.

Ferrari altered their strategy on lap 28, bringing Hamilton in for a second pit stop and fitting the medium tyres. The move committed Hamilton to a three-stop strategy, immediately giving him a pace advantage over the Mercedes drivers who remained on older tyres. Hamilton used the fresher tyres to reduce the time lost to Russell and Antonelli and to bring himself into contention for the net race lead. Verstappen also stopped again, although his strategy was compromised by a slow pit stop. During the second stint, Antonelli began to close on Russell and asked whether Mercedes was comfortable with him pushing his teammate. Russell defended from Antonelli into the first corner on lap 33, while Mercedes warned that the pair could lose time if they fought too aggressively. Antonelli was also shown the black-and-white flag for track limits, with a further infringement bringing a time penalty. Behind them, Norris remained close enough to keep pressure on both Mercedes cars.

Norris made his second stop on lap 35. Russell stopped shortly afterwards, followed by Antonelli, leaving Hamilton in the lead but still needing to make one further pit stop. The decisive moment came on lap 41, when Alonso stopped on track with a technical problem, triggering a virtual safety car. Ferrari called Hamilton in for his third stop during the interruption, allowing him to change to hard tyres and return to the track still ahead of Russell. Verstappen also pitted under the virtual safety car, but Hamilton retained control of the race once the field returned to racing speed. After the virtual safety car period ended, Hamilton gradually extended his lead. Russell struggled to match his pace, while Antonelli and Norris closed on Russell in the battle for second place. McLaren reported Antonelli to race control for further alleged track limit offences. Hamilton's advantage reached double figures during the closing laps, with several reports describing the virtual safety car and Ferrari's three-stop strategy as the decisive factors in the result.

With five laps remaining, Antonelli attacked Russell for second place and moved ahead of his teammate after a wheel-to-wheel fight. The move damaged Antonelli's front wing, and he slowed soon afterwards before stopping with a mechanical problem, ending his run of five consecutive Grand Prix victories. Almost simultaneously, Leclerc suffered a power-steering problem and retired his Ferrari, prompting a second virtual safety car. The interruption ended before the finish, but Hamilton's lead was large enough that Russell was unable to challenge him.

==== Post-race and championship impact ====
The victory was Hamilton's first Grand Prix win for Ferrari, his first Grand Prix victory since the 2024 Belgian Grand Prix, and the 106th win of his Formula One career. It was also Ferrari's first Grand Prix victory since the 2024 Mexico City Grand Prix and ended Mercedes' winning streak at the start of the 2026 season. At 41 years old, Hamilton became the oldest Formula One Grand Prix winner since Jack Brabham in 1970, as well as making him the first Grand Prix winner over the age of 40 since Nigel Mansell in 1994. The result also gave him his seventh Formula One victory at the Circuit de Barcelona-Catalunya, moving him clear of Michael Schumacher as the driver with most wins at the circuit. The podium of Hamilton, Russell and Norris was the first all-British Formula One podium since the 1968 United States Grand Prix.

Antonelli's retirement had major championship consequences. The Mercedes driver entered the race having won the previous five Grands Prix, but his late stoppage meant that Hamilton reduced his championship deficit to 41 points, while Russell remained third in the standings. Several outlets described the result as a major shift in the title battle, both because Antonelli failed to score and because Ferrari's race pace and strategic execution suggested that Hamilton could become a more serious championship threat in the remaining rounds. Hamilton said after the race that his first Ferrari victory had once seemed unlikely, but credited the team for continuing to improve the car and support him during his adaptation to Ferrari. The Grand Prix was therefore widely treated as significant both for Hamilton's Ferrari breakthrough and for the reshaping of the 2026 Drivers' Championship.

After the race, Colapinto was given a ten-second time penalty for failing to slow sufficiently under yellow flags. The penalty dropped him from eighth to tenth in the final classification, promoting Lawson to eighth and Lindblad to ninth. Post-race investigations revealed that Hülkenberg's retirement was caused by a stray rock – kicked up by Lawson's Racing Bulls – striking the safety switch, causing the electronics to shut down while on-track. Hülkenberg brought the car back to the pit lane, where he retired.

=== Race classification ===
Pos.	No.	Driver	Constructor	Laps	Time/Retired	Grid	Points
1	44	(United Kingdom) Lewis Hamilton	Ferrari	66	1:32:28.105	2	25
2	63	(United Kingdom) George Russell	Mercedes	66	+19.561	1	18
3	1	(United Kingdom) Lando Norris	McLaren-Mercedes	66	+23.719	4	15
4	3	(Netherlands) Max Verstappen	Red Bull Racing-Red Bull Ford	66	+40.497	5	12
5	81	(Australia) Oscar Piastri	McLaren-Mercedes	66	+58.661	7	10
6	6	(France) Isack Hadjar	Red Bull Racing-Red Bull Ford	65	+1 lap	6	8
7	10	(France) Pierre Gasly	Alpine-Mercedes	65	+1 lap	14	6
8	30	(New Zealand) Liam Lawson	Racing Bulls-Red Bull Ford	65	+1 lap	8	4
9	41	(United Kingdom) Arvid Lindblad	Racing Bulls-Red Bull Ford	65	+1 lap	11	2
10	43	(Argentina) Franco Colapinto	Alpine-Mercedes	65	+1 lap^{a}	13	1
11	5	(Brazil) Gabriel Bortoleto	Audi	64	+2 laps	12	
12	55	(Spain) Carlos Sainz Jr.	Atlassian Williams-Mercedes	64	+2 laps	16	
13	31	(France) Esteban Ocon	Haas-Ferrari	64	+2 laps	17	
14	11	(Mexico) Sergio Pérez	Cadillac-Ferrari	63	+3 laps	19	
15^{b}	16	(Monaco) Charles Leclerc	Ferrari	62	Hydraulics	10	
16^{b}	12	(Italy) Kimi Antonelli	Mercedes	61	Engine^{c}	3	
17^{b}	87	(United Kingdom) Oliver Bearman	Haas-Ferrari	60	Electrical	15	
NC^{d}	23	(Thailand) Alexander Albon	Atlassian Williams-Mercedes	55	+11 laps	18	
Ret	14	(Spain) Fernando Alonso	Aston Martin Aramco-Honda	37	Battery	PL	
Ret	27	(Germany) Nico Hülkenberg	Audi	29	Safety switch	9	
Ret	77	(Finland) Valtteri Bottas	Cadillac-Ferrari	15	Overheating	20	
Ret	18	(Canada) Lance Stroll	Aston Martin Aramco-Honda	5	Gearbox	21	

Notes

- ^a – Franco Colapinto finished eighth on track, but received a post-race ten-second time penalty for failing to slow for a single yellow flag.
- ^b – Charles Leclerc, Kimi Antonelli, and Oliver Bearman were classified as they completed more than 90% of the race distance.
- ^c – Kimi Antonelli received a post-race five-second time penalty for exceeding track limits. The penalty made no difference as he retired from the race.
- ^d – Alexander Albon was not classified as he did not complete 90% of the race distance.

== Championship standings after the race ==
Drivers' Championship standings

	Pos.	Driver	Points
	1	(Italy) Kimi Antonelli	156
	2	(United Kingdom) Lewis Hamilton	115
	3	(United Kingdom) George Russell	106
	4	(Monaco) Charles Leclerc	75
1	5	(United Kingdom) Lando Norris	73

Constructors' Championship standings

Pos.	Constructor	Points
1	(Germany) Mercedes	262
2	(Italy) Ferrari	190
3	(United Kingdom) McLaren-Mercedes	143
4	(Austria) Red Bull Racing-Red Bull Ford	92
5	(France) Alpine-Mercedes	48

- Note: Only the top five positions are included for both sets of standings.

== See also ==
- 2026 Barcelona Formula 2 round
- 2026 Barcelona Formula 3 round

== Notes ==
Previous race: 2026 Monaco Grand Prix	FIA Formula One World Championship; 2026 season	Next race: 2026 Austrian Grand Prix
Previous race: None; Previous race at the Circuit de Barcelona-Catalunya: 2025 Spanish Grand Prix	Barcelona-Catalunya Grand Prix	Next race: 2028 Barcelona-Catalunya Grand Prix
