= 1968 United States Grand Prix =

Race details
- Date: October 6, 1968
- Official name: XI United States Grand Prix
- Location: Watkins Glen Grand Prix Race Course; Watkins Glen, New York
- Course: Permanent road course
- Course length: 3.78 km (2.35 miles)
- Distance: 108 laps, 408.2 km (253.8 miles)
- Weather: Temperatures reaching a maximum of 20 °C (68 °F); wind speeds up to 14.82 km/h (9.21 mph)

Pole position
Driver	(United States) Mario Andretti	Lotus-Ford
- Time: 1:04.20

Fastest lap
Driver	(United Kingdom) Jackie Stewart	Matra-Ford
- Time: 1:05.22 on lap 52

Podium
First	(United Kingdom) Jackie Stewart	Matra-Ford
Second	(United Kingdom) Graham Hill	Lotus-Ford
Third	(United Kingdom) John Surtees	Honda

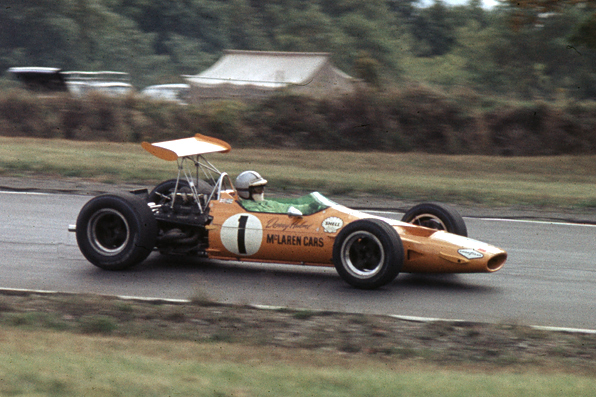
Denny Hulme finished 5th in a McLaren M7A

The 1968 United States Grand Prix was a Formula One motor race held on October 6, 1968, at the Watkins Glen Grand Prix Race Course in Watkins Glen, New York. It was race 11 of 12 in both the 1968 World Championship of Drivers and the 1968 International Cup for Formula One Manufacturers. The 108-lap race was won by Matra driver Jackie Stewart after he started from second position. Graham Hill finished second for the Lotus team and Honda driver John Surtees came in third. This was the most recent occurrence of an all-British podium in the sport until the 2026 Barcelona-Catalunya Grand Prix, 58 years later. This was the debut race of the future world champion Mario Andretti, and his first Formula One pole position.

== Summary ==
The first practice day was primarily a duel between Jackie Stewart and the Ferrari of Chris Amon, with Stewart posting the day's best time of 1:04.27. Stewart was unable to defend his provisional pole during the second practice day due to a broken stub-axle. However, Graham Hill bumped Amon from the second spot, before Mario Andretti—driving at Watkins Glen for the first time—rewarded the partisan crowd by taking the pole in his Gold Leaf Lotus, 0.07 seconds under Stewart's time. This was Andretti's first ever Formula One start.

On race day, a huge crowd of 93,000 anticipated a strong home showing with two other Americans also on the grid—Dan Gurney, in seventh, and Bobby Unser, in nineteenth. Stewart used a better start to take the lead on the first lap from crowd favorite Andretti. After the first lap the order was: Stewart, Andretti, Amon, Hill, Jochen Rindt, Denny Hulme, Gurney, John Surtees and Bruce McLaren.

By lap six, Andretti had opened up a gap to Amon and set off for Stewart. Three laps later, the nose on Andretti's Lotus was broken, with the right wing dragging on the ground. Andretti said though he had not touched anyone, the body had just cracked. However, he continued without losing his position until lap 13, when his pit crew taped the car back together, and dropped to thirteenth place.

On lap 10, there was a fight for third place as Amon, now behind Hill, spun on his own water spillage. In lap 6, Hulme hit an oil patch, dropping from third to ninth. On lap 26, Gurney, running in third place, did a 360° spin and was overtaken by Surtees' Honda.

After lap 33, Andretti retired with a broken clutch. Gurney then took over Surtees, as the two battled for the rest of the race. By lap 40, Stewart was 26 seconds ahead of Hill, with Gurney and Surtees another 10 seconds Hill. He then sent a message to the rest of the racers by posting the fastest lap of the race on lap 52, widening his lead to 31 seconds. Hill had struggled for a while with a loose steering column, to which he said he was driving crouched up.

On lap 97, a minute and twenty seconds ahead of Bruce McLaren, Jo Siffert's Lotus began to sputter, and he signaled to his pit that he would stop to refuel in the next round. As Siffert then exited the pit lane, McLaren went by into fifth place.

Siffert regained the position after two laps, before which McLaren too had to stop for fuel. Surtees then began to back off when he realised Gurney, just ahead in third place, was slowing down because he had a slow puncture and was also running very low on fuel. Surtees used the opportunity catch up with Gurney's McLaren in the last lap, as they both finished a lap down to the leaders.

Stewart led every lap in his Matra-Ford and was threatened only once, when he rounded a corner to find two spectators walking across the track. "It's as close as I've ever come to running somebody over," he said, "I missed them by an inch." It was his first American Grand Prix victory and kept alive hopes for his first World Drivers' Championship with just one more race to go. "It was the first time in my F1 career I felt I could dictate the pace," he said, "When I went faster, the field went faster. When I went slower, they went slower. It was an extraordinary moment of realisation."

The race promoters claimed that Stewart's prize of £8,300 for winning the race was the richest in F1 history. Andretti's Lotus teammate Hill, also in the running for the season's title along with Denny Hulme, finished 24 seconds behind Stewart in second place. This was the most recent all-British podium until the Barcelona-Catalunya Grand Prix in 2026.

== Classification ==
=== Qualifying ===
Pos	No	Driver	Constructor	Time	Gap
1	12	(United States) Mario Andretti	Lotus-Ford	1:04.20	—
2	15	(United Kingdom) Jackie Stewart	Matra-Ford	1:04.27	+0.07
3	10	(United Kingdom) Graham Hill	Lotus-Ford	1:04.28	+0.08
4	6	(New Zealand) Chris Amon	Ferrari	1:04.37	+0.17
5	1	(New Zealand) Denny Hulme	McLaren-Ford	1:04.57	+0.37
6	4	(Austria) Jochen Rindt	Brabham-Repco	1:04.81	+0.61
7	14	(United States) Dan Gurney	McLaren-Ford	1:05.23	+1.03
8	3	(Australia) Jack Brabham	Brabham-Repco	1:05.25	+1.05
9	5	(United Kingdom) John Surtees	Honda	1:05.32	+1.12
10	2	(New Zealand) Bruce McLaren	McLaren-Ford	1:05.69	+1.49
11	8	(Mexico) Pedro Rodríguez	BRM	1:06.10	+1.90
12	16	(Switzerland) Jo Siffert	Lotus-Ford	1:06.17	+1.97
13	21	(France) Jean-Pierre Beltoise	Matra	1:06.96	+2.76
14	22	(United Kingdom) Piers Courage	BRM	1:07.02	+2.82
15	7	(United Kingdom) Derek Bell	Ferrari	1:07.06	+2.86
16	11	(United Kingdom) Jackie Oliver	Lotus-Ford	1:07.46	+3.26
17	18	(United Kingdom) Vic Elford	Cooper-BRM	1:08.56	+4.36
18	17	(Sweden) Jo Bonnier	McLaren-BRM	1:08.93	+4.73
19	9	(United States) Bobby Unser	BRM	1:09.60	+5.40
20	19	(Belgium) Lucien Bianchi	Cooper-BRM	1:09.77	+5.57
21	21*	(France) Henri Pescarolo	Matra	1:10.43	+6.23

* Pescarolo also drove car number 21 as a spare car.

=== Race ===
Pos	No	Driver	Constructor	Laps	Time/Retired	Grid	Points
1	15	(United Kingdom) Jackie Stewart	Matra-Ford	108	1:59:20.29	2	9
2	10	(United Kingdom) Graham Hill	Lotus-Ford	108	+ 24.68	3	6
3	5	(United Kingdom) John Surtees	Honda	107	+ 1 lap	9	4
4	14	(United States) Dan Gurney	McLaren-Ford	107	+ 1 lap	7	3
5	16	(Switzerland) Jo Siffert	Lotus-Ford	105	+ 3 laps	12	2
6	2	(New Zealand) Bruce McLaren	McLaren-Ford	103	+ 5 laps	10	1
Ret	22	(United Kingdom) Piers Courage	BRM	93	Out of fuel	14	
Ret	1	(New Zealand) Denny Hulme	McLaren-Ford	92	Accident	5	
NC	19	(Belgium) Lucien Bianchi	Cooper-BRM	88	+ 20 laps	20	
Ret	3	(Australia) Jack Brabham	Brabham-Repco	77	Engine	8	
Ret	4	(Austria) Jochen Rindt	Brabham-Repco	73	Engine	6	
Ret	18	(United Kingdom) Vic Elford	Cooper-BRM	71	Engine	17	
Ret	8	(Mexico) Pedro Rodríguez	BRM	66	Suspension	11	
NC	17	(Sweden) Jo Bonnier	McLaren-BRM	62	+ 46 laps	18	
Ret	6	(New Zealand) Chris Amon	Ferrari	59	Water pump	4	
Ret	21	(France) Jean-Pierre Beltoise	Matra	44	Transmission	13	
Ret	9	(United States) Bobby Unser	BRM	35	Engine	19	
Ret	12	(United States) Mario Andretti	Lotus-Ford	32	Clutch	1	
Ret	7	(United Kingdom) Derek Bell	Ferrari	14	Engine	15	
DNS	11	(United Kingdom) Jackie Oliver	Lotus-Ford	0	Non starter		
DNS	20	(France) Henri Pescarolo	Matra	0	Non starter		

== Notes ==
- This was the Formula One World Championship debut for American driver and that year's Indianapolis 500 winner Bobby Unser and American driver and future World Champion Mario Andretti.

== Championship standings after the race ==
Drivers' Championship standings

	Pos	Driver	Points
	1	(United Kingdom) Graham Hill	39
1	2	(United Kingdom) Jackie Stewart	36
1	3	(New Zealand) Denny Hulme	33
	4	(Belgium) Jacky Ickx	27
	5	(New Zealand) Bruce McLaren	16

Constructors' Championship standings

	Pos	Constructor	Points
	1	(United Kingdom) Lotus-Ford	53
1	2	(France) Matra-Ford	45
1	3	(United Kingdom) McLaren-Ford	43
	4	(Italy) Ferrari	32
	5	(United Kingdom) BRM	25

- Note: Only the top five positions are included for both sets of standings.

Previous race: 1968 Canadian Grand Prix	FIA Formula One World Championship; 1968 season	Next race: 1968 Mexican Grand Prix
Previous race: 1967 United States Grand Prix	United States Grand Prix	Next race: 1969 United States Grand Prix
