= Montmeló =

- Municipality
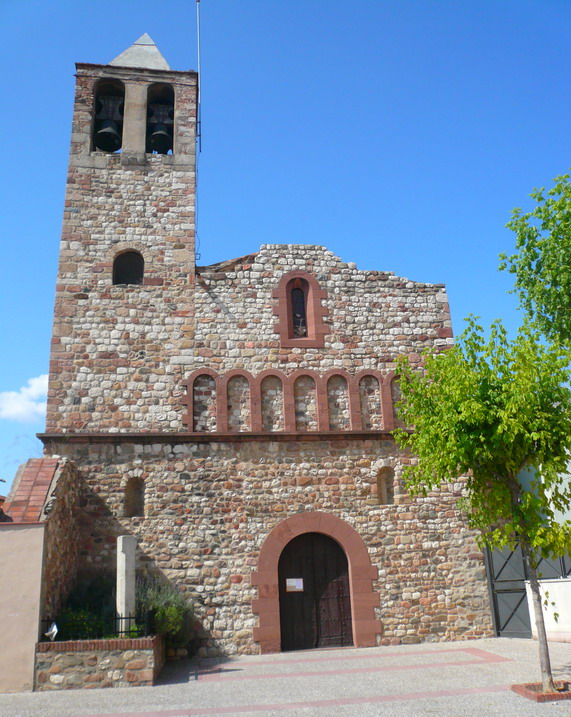
- A church in Montmeló

- Flag Coat of arms

- Location in Catalonia Montmeló (Spain)
- Coordinates: 41°33′17″N 2°15′0″E
- Country: Spain
- Community: Catalonia
- Province: Barcelona
- Comarca: Vallès Oriental

Government
  - Mayor: Antoni Jesús Guil Roman (2015)

Area
  - Total: 4.0 km^{2} (1.5 sq mi)
- Elevation: 72 m (236 ft)

Population (2025-01-01)
  - Total: 8,886
  - Density: 2,200/km^{2} (5,800/sq mi)
- Demonym(s): Montmeloní, Montmelonina
- Website: www.montmelo.cat

Montmeló (Catalan pronunciation: [ˌmomːəˈlo]) is a municipality in the comarca of Vallès Oriental, within the Barcelona metropolitan area, in Catalonia, Spain. It contains the Circuit de Barcelona-Catalunya, which is the home of the Formula One Barcelona-Catalunya Grand Prix, and was the home of the Spanish Grand Prix until 2025, and the home of MotoGP Catalan Grand Prix.

== Demography ==
1900	1930	1950	1970	1986	2007
537	880	1,020	4,384		8,873
