= Barcelona-Catalunya Grand Prix =

Formula One motor racing event first held in 2026

- Circuit de Barcelona-Catalunya

Race information
- Number of times held: 1
- First held: 2026
- Last held: 2026
- Most wins (drivers): (United Kingdom) Lewis Hamilton (1)
- Most wins (constructors): (Italy) Ferrari (1)
- Circuit length: 4.657 km (2.894 miles)
- Race length: 307.236 km (190.908 miles)
- Laps: 66

Last race (2026)

Pole position
- (United Kingdom) George Russell; Mercedes; 1:14.679

Podium
- 1. (United Kingdom) L. Hamilton; Ferrari; 1:32:28.105; 2. (United Kingdom) G. Russell; Mercedes; +19.561; 3. (United Kingdom) L. Norris; McLaren-Mercedes; +23.719

Fastest lap
- (United Kingdom) Lewis Hamilton; Ferrari; 1:20.122

The Barcelona-Catalunya Grand Prix (Spanish: Gran Premio de Barcelona-Catalunya [sic], Catalan: Gran Premi de Barcelona-Catalunya) is a Formula One motor racing event held at the Circuit de Barcelona-Catalunya. It was first held in 2026 as the first of two Grands Prix in Spain that season, along with the Spanish Grand Prix at the Madring. The Grand Prix is in a rotational slot with the Belgian Grand Prix from 2026 through 2032, with the event being held in even-numbered years.

== History ==
The Circuit de Barcelona-Catalunya was originally scheduled to be used as the venue for the Spanish Grand Prix until 2026. However, Spain's capital city, Madrid, was nominated as a new host of Formula One, with the Madring scheduled to make its debut in 2026 and therefore taking the Spanish Grand Prix name. As a result, the circuit's 2026 event was renamed to the Barcelona-Catalunya Grand Prix. The 2026 season marked the first time that Spain hosted two Grands Prix since the 2012 season, the second of which was held under the name of the European Grand Prix at the Valencia Street Circuit.

The Circuit de Barcelona-Catalunya signed a multi-year extension to keep the Barcelona-Catalunya Grand Prix on the Formula One calendar in 2028, 2030, and 2032. Under the extension, the Grand Prix will rotate its slot with the Belgian Grand Prix, which, in addition to 2026, will be held in 2027, 2029, and 2031.

== Winners ==
The only Barcelona-Catalunya Grand Prix as of 2026 was held at the Circuit de Barcelona-Catalunya.

=== By year ===
Year	Driver	Constructor	Report
2026	(United Kingdom) Lewis Hamilton	Ferrari	Report
