= 2020 GT Cup Open Europe =

The 2020 GT Cup Open Europe is the second season of the GT Cup Open Europe, the grand tourer-style sports car racing series founded by the Spanish GT Sport Organización. It began on 8 August at the Hungaroring and finished on 1 November at the Circuit de Barcelona-Catalunya after five double-header meetings.

== Entry list ==
Team	Car	No.	Drivers	Class	Rounds
(Spain) Baporo Motorsport	Audi R8 LMS GT4 Evo	10	(Spain) Daniel Díaz-Varela	Am	All
(Spain) Baporo Motorsport	Audi R8 LMS GT4 Evo	10	(Andorra) Manuel Cerqueda	Am	All
(Spain) Baporo Motorsport	Porsche 991 GT3 Cup	13	(Spain) Jaume Font	Am	1–2
(Spain) NM Racing Team	Mercedes-AMG GT4	15	(Spain) Rafael Villanueva	PA	2, 4–5
(Spain) NM Racing Team	Mercedes-AMG GT4	15	(Spain) Alberto de Martín	PA	2, 4–5
(Spain) NM Racing Team	Transam Euro (Ford Mustang)	26	(Spain) Albert Estragués	Am	1–2
(Spain) NM Racing Team	Transam Euro (Ford Mustang)	126	(Spain) Albert Estragués	Am	5
(Germany) PROsport Racing	Aston Martin Vantage AMR GT4	19	(Belgium) Rodrigue Gillion (Note: For Race 1 at Spa, Rodrigue Gillion raced solo. For Race 2 he shared the car with Nico Verdonck.)	PA	2, 4
(Germany) PROsport Racing	Aston Martin Vantage AMR GT4	19	(Belgium) Nico Verdonck	PA	2, 4
(Switzerland) PZ Oberer Zürichsee by TFT	Porsche 991 GT3 Cup	22	(Switzerland) Niki Leutwiler	PA	1–2
(Switzerland) PZ Oberer Zürichsee by TFT	Porsche 991 GT3 Cup	22	(France) Vincent Beltoise	PA	1
(Switzerland) PZ Oberer Zürichsee by TFT	Porsche 991 GT3 Cup	22	(Netherlands) Bas Schouten	PA	2
(Slovakia) Racing Trevor	BMW M4 GT4	40	(Slovakia) Gregor Zsigio	Am	1
(Slovakia) Racing Trevor	BMW M4 GT4	40	(Hungary) Walter Csaba	Am	1
(Italy) Ombra Racing	Porsche 991 GT3 Cup	51	(Italy) Aldo Festante	PA	All
(Portugal) Sports and you	Mercedes-AMG GT4	60	(Portugal) Antonio Coimbra	Am	3–4
(Portugal) Sports and you	Mercedes-AMG GT4	60	(Portugal) Luis Silva	Am	3–4
(Portugal) Sports and you	Mercedes-AMG GT4	99	(Portugal) Antonio Coimbra	Am	1–2
(Portugal) Sports and you	Mercedes-AMG GT4	99	(Portugal) Luis Silva	Am	1–2
(San Marino) GDL Racing	Porsche 991 GT3 Cup	66	(Italy) Roberto Rayneri	Am	2
(San Marino) GDL Racing	Porsche 991 GT3 Cup	67	(Italy) Mario Cordoni	Am	2
(Poland) Team Virage	Aston Martin Vantage AMR GT4	77	(Hungary) Robert Heffler	PA	1–2
(Poland) Team Virage	Aston Martin Vantage AMR GT4	77	(Spain) Philippe Valenza	PA	1–2
(Poland) Team Virage	Aston Martin Vantage AMR GT4	88	(France) Stéphane Adler	Am	1
(Poland) Team Virage	Aston Martin Vantage AMR GT4	88	(France) Michaël Blanchemain	Am	1

== Race calendar and results ==
- A provisional six-round calendar was revealed on 22 October 2019. The schedule consists of 6 circuits, all the rounds supporting the International GT Open. The series has added a round at Hockenheim and for the first time ever, the series will travel to Pergusa as part of a movement to reintroduce racing to this historic track. As a result the series has dropped the Hungaroring and Silverstone from the calendar for 2020. The new schedule has also changed the dates of the Barcelona and Monza rounds with Barcelona now hosting the season finale. On 10 January 2020, a revised schedule was released that drops Pergusa in favor of the Red Bull Ring. On 19 March 2020, it was announced that the season opening round at Le Castellet would be moved to 20-23 August in response to the coronavirus outbreak. On 6 April, 2020, it was announced that the Spa round would be postponed to a later date as well. The Barcelona round was also moved in response to avoid having races on consecutive weekends. A provisional calendar was released on 12 May 2020 with a five event calendar instead of the planned six caused by Hockenheim losing its place on the calendar due to date conflicts. The Hungaroring also replaced the Red Bull Ring on this new calendar. The only change made afterwards to this schedule was to move the date of the Hungaroring round.

Round		Circuit	Date	Pole position	Pro-Am Winner	Am Winner
1	R1	(Hungary) Hungaroring	8 August	(Italy) No. 51 Ombra Racing	(Switzerland) No. 22 PZ Oberer Zürichsee by TFT	(Spain) No. 13 Baporo Motorsport
1	R1	(Hungary) Hungaroring	8 August	(Italy) Aldo Festante	(Switzerland) Niki Leutwiler (France) Vincent Beltoise	(Spain) Jaume Font
1	R2	(Hungary) Hungaroring	9 August	(Italy) No. 51 Ombra Racing	(Italy) No. 51 Ombra Racing	(Spain) No. 13 Baporo Motorsport
1	R2	(Hungary) Hungaroring	9 August	(Italy) Aldo Festante	(Italy) Aldo Festante	(Spain) Jaume Font
2	R1	(France) Circuit Paul Ricard, Le Castellet	22 August	(Spain) No. 10 Baporo Motorsport	(Switzerland) No. 22 PZ Oberer Zürichsee by TFT	(Spain) No. 10 Baporo Motorsport
2	R1	(France) Circuit Paul Ricard, Le Castellet	22 August	(Andorra) Manuel Cerqueda (Spain) Daniel Díaz-Varela	(Switzerland) Niki Leutwiler (Netherlands) Bas Schouten	(Andorra) Manuel Cerqueda (Spain) Daniel Díaz-Varela
2	R2	(France) Circuit Paul Ricard, Le Castellet	23 August	(Italy) No. 51 Ombra Racing	(Italy) No. 51 Ombra Racing	(Spain) No. 10 Baporo Motorsport
2	R2	(France) Circuit Paul Ricard, Le Castellet	23 August	(Italy) Aldo Festante	(Italy) Aldo Festante	(Andorra) Manuel Cerqueda (Spain) Daniel Díaz-Varela
3	R1	(Italy) Autodromo Nazionale Monza	26 September	(Spain) No. 10 Baporo Motorsport	(Italy) No. 51 Ombra Racing	(Spain) No. 10 Baporo Motorsport
3	R1	(Italy) Autodromo Nazionale Monza	26 September	(Andorra) Manuel Cerqueda (Spain) Daniel Díaz-Varela	(Italy) Aldo Festante	(Andorra) Manuel Cerqueda (Spain) Daniel Díaz-Varela
3	R2	(Italy) Autodromo Nazionale Monza	27 September	(Italy) No. 51 Ombra Racing	(Italy) No. 51 Ombra Racing	(Spain) No. 10 Baporo Motorsport
3	R2	(Italy) Autodromo Nazionale Monza	27 September	(Italy) Aldo Festante	(Italy) Aldo Festante	(Andorra) Manuel Cerqueda (Spain) Daniel Díaz-Varela
4	R1	(Belgium) Circuit de Spa-Francorchamps	17 October	(Italy) No. 51 Ombra Racing	(Italy) No. 51 Ombra Racing	(Spain) No. 10 Baporo Motorsport
4	R1	(Belgium) Circuit de Spa-Francorchamps	17 October	(Italy) Aldo Festante	(Italy) Aldo Festante	(Andorra) Manuel Cerqueda (Spain) Daniel Díaz-Varela
4	R2	(Belgium) Circuit de Spa-Francorchamps	18 October	(Germany) No. 19 PROsport Racing	(Italy) No. 51 Ombra Racing	(Spain) No. 10 Baporo Motorsport
4	R2	(Belgium) Circuit de Spa-Francorchamps	18 October	(Belgium) Rodrigue Gillion (Belgium) Nico Verdonck	(Italy) Aldo Festante	(Andorra) Manuel Cerqueda (Spain) Daniel Díaz-Varela
5	R1	(Spain) Circuit de Barcelona-Catalunya	31 October	(Italy) No. 51 Ombra Racing	(Italy) No. 51 Ombra Racing	(Spain) No. 10 Baporo Motorsport
5	R1	(Spain) Circuit de Barcelona-Catalunya	31 October	(Italy) Aldo Festante	(Italy) Aldo Festante	(Andorra) Manuel Cerqueda (Spain) Daniel Díaz-Varela
5	R2	(Spain) Circuit de Barcelona-Catalunya	1 November	(Italy) No. 51 Ombra Racing	(Italy) No. 51 Ombra Racing	(Spain) No. 10 Baporo Motorsport
5	R2	(Spain) Circuit de Barcelona-Catalunya	1 November	(Italy) Aldo Festante	(Italy) Aldo Festante	(Andorra) Manuel Cerqueda (Spain) Daniel Díaz-Varela

== Championship standings ==
=== Points systems ===
Points are awarded to the top 10 (Overall) or top 6 (Am, Pro-Am, Teams) classified finishers. If less than 6 participants start the race or if less than 75% of the original race distance is completed, half points are awarded. At the end of the season, the lowest race score is dropped; however, the dropped race cannot be the result of a disqualification or race ban.

==== Overall ====
Position	1st	2nd	3rd	4th	5th	6th	7th	8th	9th	10th
Points	15	12	10	8	6	5	4	3	2	1

==== Pro-Am, Am, and Teams ====
Position	1st	2nd	3rd	4th	5th	6th
Points	10	8	6	4	3	2

=== Drivers' championships ===
==== Overall ====
Pos.	Driver	Team	HUN (Hungary)		LEC (France)		MNZ (Italy)		SPA (Belgium)		CAT (Spain)		Points
1	(Italy) Aldo Festante	(Italy) Ombra Racing	3	1	Ret	1	1	1	1	1	1	1	130
2	(Andorra) Manuel Cerqueda (Spain) Daniel Díaz-Varela	(Spain) Baporo Motorsport	4	6	1	3	2	2	2	2	2	2	110
3	(Portugal) Luis Silva (Portugal) Antonio Coimbra	(Portugal) Sports and you	5	Ret	4	8	3	3	3	5			55
4	(Switzerland) Niki Leutwiler	(Switzerland) PZ Oberer Zürichsee with TFT Racing	2	2	2	4							44
5	(Spain) Rafael Villanueva (Spain) Alberto de Martín	(Spain) NM Racing Team			3	10			Ret	4	3	3	41
6	(Spain) Jaume Font	(Spain) Baporo Motorsport	1	3	Ret	5							31
7	(France) Vincent Beltoise	(Switzerland) PZ Oberer Zürichsee with TFT Racing	2	2									24
8	(Spain) Philippe Valenza (Hungary) Robert Heffler	(Poland) Team Virage	Ret	5	7	2							22
9	(Netherlands) Bas Schouten	(Switzerland) PZ Oberer Zürichsee with TFT Racing			2	4							20
10	(Belgium) Rodrigue Gillion	(Germany) PROsport Racing			Ret	7			4	DSQ			12
11	(Italy) Mario Cordoni	(San Marino) GDL Racing			5	6							11
12	(Spain) Albert Estragués	(Spain) NM Racing Team	Ret	4	Ret	DNS					Ret	Ret	8
13	(France) Michaël Blanchemain (France) Stéphane Adler	(Poland) Team Virage	6	8									8
14	(Hungary) Csaba Walter (Slovakia) Gregor Zsigio	(Slovakia) Racing Trevor	7	7									8
15	(Italy) Roberto Rayneri	(San Marino) GDL Racing			6	9							7
16	(Belgium) Nico Verdonck	(Germany) PROsport Racing			Ret	7				DSQ			4
Pos.	Driver	Team	HUN (Hungary)		LEC (France)		MNZ (Italy)		SPA (Belgium)		CAT (Spain)		Points

==== Pro-Am ====
Pos.	Driver	Team	HUN (Hungary)		LEC (France)		MNZ (Italy)		SPA (Belgium)		CAT (Spain)		Points
1	(Italy) Aldo Festante	(Italy) Ombra Racing	2	1	Ret	1	1	1	1	1	1	1	49
2	(Spain) Rafael Villanueva (Spain) Alberto de Martín	(Spain) NM Racing Team			2	5			Ret	3	2	2	21
3	(Switzerland) Niki Leutwiler	(Switzerland) PZ Oberer Zürichsee with TFT Racing	1	2	1	3							17
4	(Spain) Philippe Valenza (Hungary) Robert Heffler	(Poland) Team Virage	Ret	3	3	2							10
5	(France) Vincent Beltoise	(Switzerland) PZ Oberer Zürichsee with TFT Racing	1	2									9
6	(Netherlands) Bas Schouten	(Switzerland) PZ Oberer Zürichsee with TFT Racing			1	3							8
7	(Belgium) Rodrigue Gillion	(Germany) PROsport Racing			Ret	4			2	DSQ			6
8	(Belgium) Nico Verdonck	(Germany) PROsport Racing			Ret	4				DSQ			2
Pos.	Driver	Team	HUN (Hungary)		LEC (France)		MNZ (Italy)		SPA (Belgium)		CAT (Spain)		Points

==== Am ====
Pos.	Driver	Team	HUN (Hungary)		LEC (France)		MNZ (Italy)		SPA (Belgium)		CAT (Spain)		Points
1	(Andorra) Manuel Cerqueda (Spain) Daniel Díaz-Varela	(Spain) Baporo Motorsport	2	3	1	1	1	1	1	1	1	1	64
2	(Portugal) Luis Silva (Portugal) Antonio Coimbra	(Portugal) Sports and you	3	Ret	2	4	2	2	2	2			32
3	(Spain) Jaume Font	(Spain) Baporo Motorsport	1	1	Ret	2							24
4	(Italy) Mario Cordoni	(San Marino) GDL Racing			3	3							8
5	(Spain) Albert Estragués	(Spain) NM Racing Team	Ret	2	Ret	DNS					Ret	Ret	8
6	(Hungary) Csaba Walter (Slovakia) Gregor Zsigio	(Slovakia) Racing Trevor	5	4									7
7	(France) Michaël Blanchemain (France) Stéphane Adler	(Poland) Team Virage	4	5									7
8	(Italy) Roberto Rayneri	(San Marino) GDL Racing			4	5							5
Pos.	Driver	Team	HUN (Hungary)		LEC (France)		MNZ (Italy)		SPA (Belgium)		CAT (Spain)		Points

=== Teams' Championship ===
Only the highest two finishing cars from a team count towards the Teams' Championship

Pos.	Team	Manufacturer	Points
1	(Spain) Baporo Motorsport	Audi; Porsche	89
2	(Italy) Ombra Racing	Porsche	86
3	(Spain) NM Racing Team	Transam Euro; Mercedes-AMG	35
4	(Portugal) Sports and you	Mercedes-AMG	29
5	(Switzerland) PZ Oberer Zürichsee by TFT	Porsche	28
6	(Poland) Team Virage	Aston Martin	13
7	(San Marino) GDL Racing	Porsche	7
8	(Germany) PROsport Racing	Aston Martin	4
9	(Slovakia) Racing Trevor	BMW	0
Pos.	Team	Manufacturer	Points
