= Aldo Festante =

Italian racing driver (born 2000)

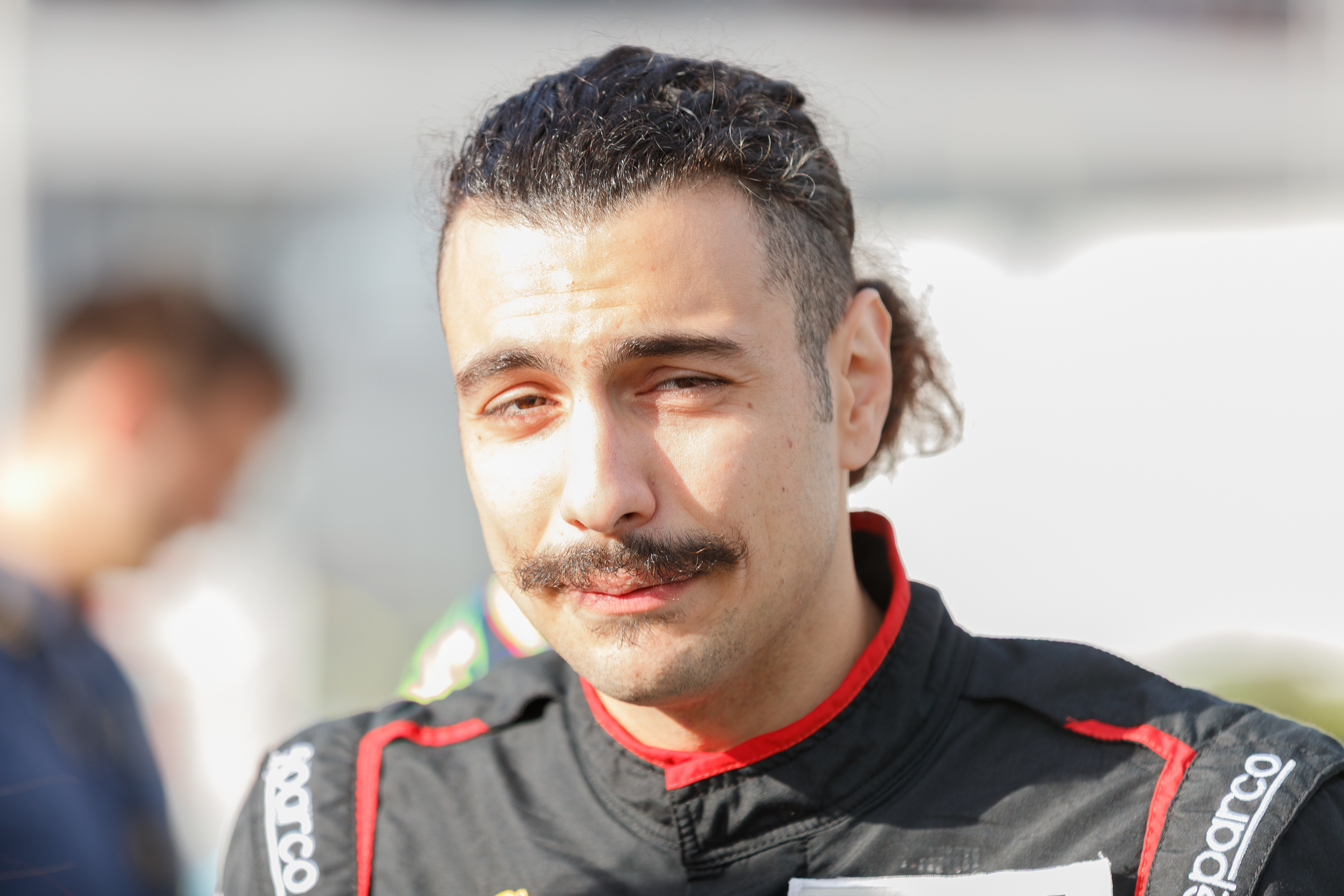
- Festante in 2023
- Nationality: (Italy) Italian (Canada) Canadian via dual nationality
- Born: 23 May 2000 (age 26) Capua, Italy
- Categorisation: FIA Silver

Championship titles
- 2020: GT Cup Open Europe

Aldo Festante (born 23 May 2000) is an Italian and Canadian racing driver who last competed for Target Competition in Porsche Carrera Cup Italy, Porsche Carrera Cup Germany and Porsche Supercup.

Born in Capua to an Italian-Canadian father and a Swiss-born Italian mother, Festante began racing single-seaters in 2016, reaching Euroformula Open before moving on to one-make Porsche competition in late 2019 and becoming a mainstay in Porsche Carrera Cup Italy since. He was the 2020 GT Cup Open Europe champion.

== Career ==
Festante made his single-seater debut in 2016, racing for Mücke Motorsport in the Italian F4 Championship. In his first season in the series, Festante scored a best finish of tenth in race one at Adria to end the year 32nd in points. Switching to DR Formula for the following season, Festante scored a lone podium from pole in race three at Vallelunga, but wasn't classified in the final standings as he didn't race in the final round. In parallel, Festante raced in the first four rounds of the French F4 Championship, taking a best result of seventh in race three at Monza.

Stepping up to Euroformula Open in 2018, Festante joined RP Motorsport for his rookie season in the series. After racing with them through the first two rounds and scoring a best result of fifth in race one at Le Castellet, Festante switched to Fortec Motorsports for the next two rounds, before completing the season with Teo Martín Motorsport en route to a ninth-place points finish. Returning to the latter for 2019, Festante scored a best result of eighth twice, before leaving the team with three rounds to go to compete in the final three rounds of Porsche Carrera Cup Italy for Ombra Racing.

Remaining with Ombra Racing on a full-time basis for 2020, Festante raced with them in both Porsche Carrera Cup Italy and GT Cup Open Europe. In the former, Festante scored his maiden series win at Monza to take fourth in points, whereas in the latter, he won eight times as he clinched the overall and Pro-Am titles. Staying with the team for his second full-time season in Carrera Cup Italy the following year, Festante took a best result of fourth in race one at Mugello as he ended the year 13th in the overall standings. Another season in Porsche Carrera Cup Italy then ensued, in which Festante drove for Raptor Engineering to a second consecutive 13th-place points finish, with a best result of fifth in race two at Misano.

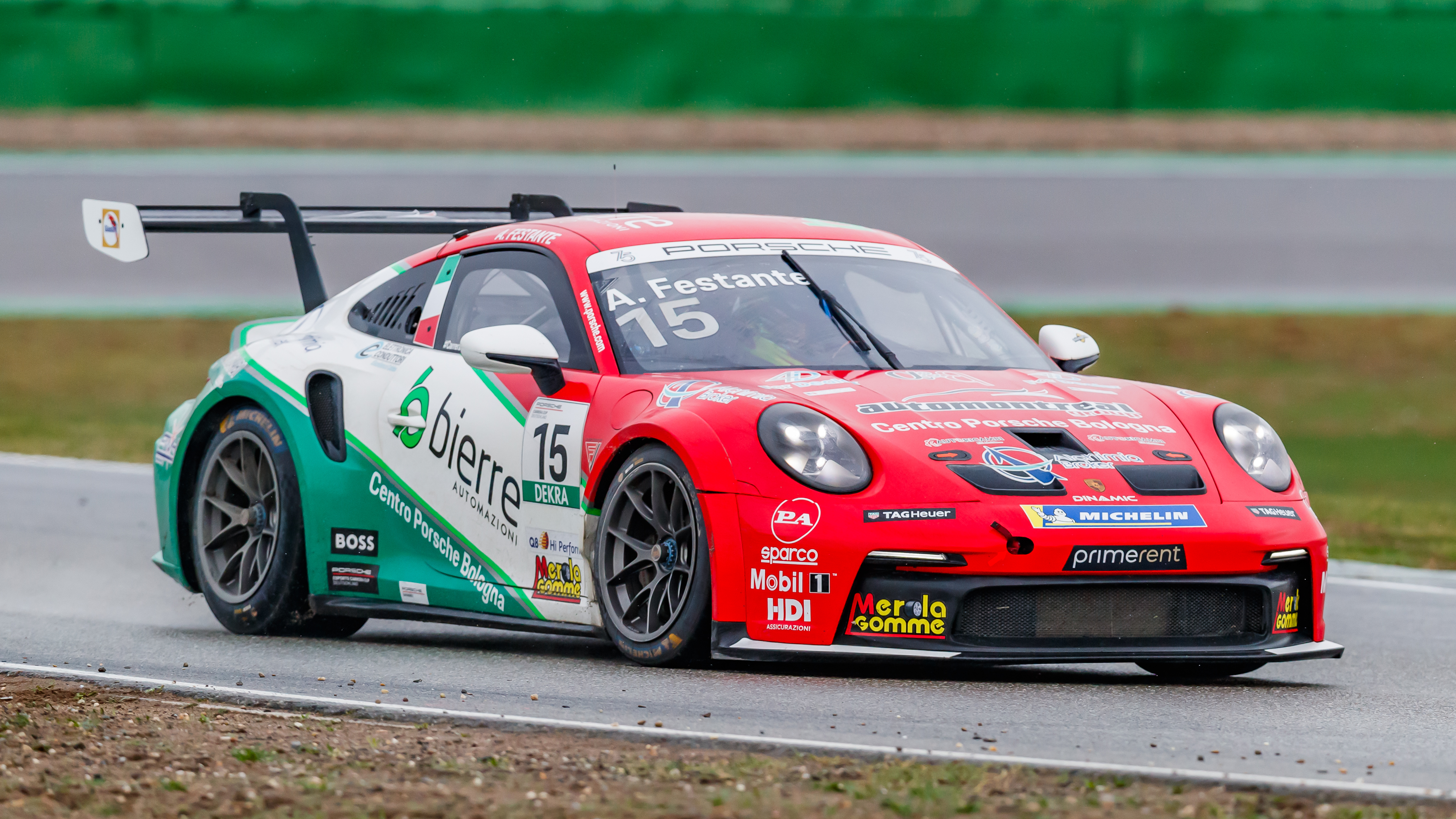
Festante racing for Dinamic at the Hockenheim round of PCCD in 2023.

Switching to Dinamic Motorsport to continue in Porsche Carrera Cup Italy for 2023, Festante scored a best result of fourth in race one at Vallelunga to take ninth in points. Continuing with Dinamic for 2024, Festante raced with them in both Porsche Carrera Cup Italy and Porsche Supercup. In the former, Festante was tenth in points with a best result of fourth in race two at Mugello, whereas in the latter, he was 17th with a best result of tenth at the season-opening race at Imola. Returning for a similar campaign in 2025, Festante most notably scored a double podium at Vallelunga in the Italian series en route to a seventh-place points finish, but slipped to 19th in Porsche Supercup.

The following year, Festante switched to Target Competition for a triple campaign in Porsche Carrera Cup Italy, Porsche Carrera Cup Germany and Porsche Supercup. Between the three campaigns, Festante found more success in the Italian series, scoring podiums at both Misano and Monza en route to fifth in overall points.

== Karting record ==
=== Karting career summary ===
| Season | Series | Team | Position |
|---|---|---|---|
| 2012 | WSK Silver Cup — KF-J | | 19th |
| 2012 | Italian Karting Championship — KF-J | | 39th |
| 2013 | WSK Master Series — KF-J | Fabio Pacitto; Vincenzo Festante (Note: Festante competed for Fabio Pacitto in round 2 and for Vincenzo Festante in round 4.) | 86th |
| 2013 | WSK Euro Series — KF-J | Fabio Pacitto | 46th |
| 2013 | Karting World Championship — KF-J | Vincenzo Festante | NC |
| 2013 | Italian Karting Championship — KF-J | | NC |
| 2014 | WSK Champions Cup — KF-J | Forza Racing | 61st |
| 2014 | WSK Super Master Series — KF-J | Forza Racing | 73rd |
| 2014 | European Karting Championship — KF-J | Forza Racing | 39th |
| 2014 | WSK Final Cup — KF-J | Forza Racing | NC |
| 2014 | Italian Karting Championship — KF-J | | 7th |
| 2014 | Kartmasters British GP — X30 Junior | | 19th |
| 2015 | WSK Champions Cup — KF | Forza Racing | 25th |
| 2015 | WSK Gold Cup — KF | Forza Racing | 16th |
| 2015 | WSK Super Master Series — KF | Forza Racing | 43rd |
| 2015 | Andrea Margutti Trophy — KF | Forza Racing | 12th |
| 2015 | Karting World Championship — KF | Forza Racing | 49th |
| 2016 | South Garda Winter Cup — Mini Rok | Marco Festante | NC |
| 2017 | Ayrton Senna Trophy — Rotax Mini | Laudato Racing | 2nd |

== Racing record ==
=== Racing career summary ===
| Season | Series | Team | Races | Wins | Poles | F/Laps | Podiums | Points | Position |
|---|---|---|---|---|---|---|---|---|---|
| 2016 | Italian F4 Championship | Mücke Motorsport | 18 | 0 | 0 | 0 | 0 | 1 | 32nd |
| 2017 | Italian F4 Championship | DR Formula | 15 | 0 | 1 | 0 | 1 | 57 | NC |
| 2017 | French F4 Championship | FFSA Academy | 12 | 0 | 0 | 0 | 0 | 11 | 14th |
| 2018 | Euroformula Open Championship | RP Motorsport | 4 | 0 | 0 | 0 | 0 | 29 | 9th |
| 2018 | Euroformula Open Championship | Fortec Motorsports | 4 | 0 | 0 | 0 | 0 | 29 | 9th |
| 2018 | Euroformula Open Championship | Teo Martín Motorsport | 8 | 0 | 0 | 0 | 0 | 29 | 9th |
| 2019 | Euroformula Open Winter Series | Teo Martín Motorsport | 2 | 0 | 0 | 0 | 0 | 0 | NC |
| 2019 | Euroformula Open Championship | Teo Martín Motorsport | 12 | 0 | 0 | 0 | 0 | 10 | 21st |
| 2019 | Porsche Carrera Cup Italy | Ombra Racing | 6 | 0 | 0 | 1 | 0 | 17 | 16th |
| 2020 | Porsche Carrera Cup Italy | Ombra Racing | 12 | 1 | 1 | 0 | 3 | 89 | 4th |
| 2020 | GT Cup Open Europe | Ombra Racing | 10 | 8 | 4 | 4 | 9 | 130 | **1st** |
| 2020 | International GT Open | Ombra Racing | 6 | 0 | 0 | 0 | 0 | 0 | NC† |
| 2021 | Porsche Carrera Cup Italy | Ombra Racing | 12 | 0 | 0 | 4 | 0 | 70 | 13th |
| 2022 | Porsche Carrera Cup Italy | Raptor Engineering | 12 | 0 | 0 | 0 | 0 | 60 | 13th |
| 2023 | Porsche Carrera Cup Italy | Dinamic Motorsport | 12 | 0 | 0 | 1 | 0 | 75 | 9th |
| 2023 | Porsche Supercup | Dinamic Motorsport | 1 | 0 | 0 | 0 | 0 | 0 | NC† |
| 2023 | Porsche Carrera Cup Germany | Dinamic Motorsport | 2 | 0 | 0 | 0 | 0 | 0 | NC† |
| 2024 | Porsche Carrera Cup Italy | Dinamic Motorsport | 12 | 0 | 0 | 0 | 0 | 76 | 10th |
| 2024 | Porsche Supercup | Dinamic Motorsport | 8 | 0 | 0 | 0 | 0 | 13 | 17th |
| 2025 | Porsche Carrera Cup Italy | Dinamic Motorsport | 12 | 0 | 0 | 0 | 2 | 86 | 7th |
| 2025 | Porsche Supercup | Dinamic Motorsport | 6 | 0 | 0 | 0 | 0 | 12 | 19th |
| 2026 | Porsche Carrera Cup Germany | Target Competition | 6 | 0 | 0 | 1 | 0 | 0 | NC† |
| 2026 | Porsche Carrera Cup Italy | Target Competition | 12 | 0 | 0 | 1 | 2 | 118 | 5th |
| 2026 | Porsche Supercup | Target Competition | 8 | 0 | 0 | 0 | 0 | 16 | 17th |

^{†} As Festante was a guest driver, he was ineligible to score points.

=== Complete Italian F4 Championship results ===
(key) (Races in bold indicate pole position) (Races in italics indicate fastest lap)

| Year | Team | 1 | 2 | 3 | 4 | 5 | 6 | 7 | 8 | 9 | 10 | 11 | 12 | 13 | 14 | 15 | 16 | 17 | 18 | 19 | 20 | 21 | 22 | 23 | Pos | Points |
|---|---|---|---|---|---|---|---|---|---|---|---|---|---|---|---|---|---|---|---|---|---|---|---|---|---|---|
| 2016 | Mücke Motorsport | MIS; 1; 24 | MIS; 2 | MIS; 3; 17 | MIS; 4; 19 | ADR; 1; 10 | ADR; 2; 13 | ADR; 3 | ADR; 4; 18 | IMO1; 1; 21 | IMO1; 2; 23 | IMO1; 3; 28 | MUG; 1; 17 | MUG; 2; 21 | MUG; 3 Ret | VLL; 1; 18 | VLL; 2; 14 | VLL; 3; 26 | IMO2; 1; 16 | IMO2; 2; 18 | IMO2; 3; 21 | MNZ; 1 | MNZ; 2 | MNZ; 3 | 32nd | 1 |
| 2017 | DR Formula | MIS; 1; 12 | MIS; 2; 15 | MIS; 3; 10 | ADR; 1; 19 | ADR; 2; 4 | ADR; 3; 12 | VLL; 1 Ret | VLL; 2; 4 | **VLL**; **3**; 3 | MUG1; 1; 8 | MUG1; 2; 9 | MUG1; 3; 17 | IMO; 1 | IMO; 2 | IMO; 3 | MUG2; 1; 11 | MUG2; 2; 13 | MUG2; 3; 6 | MNZ; 1 | MNZ; 2 | MNZ; 3 | | | NC | 57 |

=== Complete French F4 Championship results ===
(key) (Races in bold indicate pole position) (Races in italics indicate fastest lap)

| Year | 1 | 2 | 3 | 4 | 5 | 6 | 7 | 8 | 9 | 10 | 11 | 12 | 13 | 14 | 15 | 16 | 17 | 18 | 19 | 20 | 21 | Pos | Points |
|---|---|---|---|---|---|---|---|---|---|---|---|---|---|---|---|---|---|---|---|---|---|---|---|
| 2017 | NOG; 1; 14 | NOG; 2; 15 | NOG; 3; 9 | MNZ; 1; 14 | MNZ; 2; 12 | MNZ; 3; 7 | PAU; 1; 9 | PAU; 2; 15 | PAU; 3; 11 | SPA; 1; 13 | SPA; 2; 9 | SPA; 3; 11 | MAG; 1 | MAG; 2 | MAG; 3 | CAT; 1 | CAT; 2 | CAT; 3 | LEC; 1 | LEC; 2 | LEC; 3 | 14th | 11 |

=== Complete Euroformula Open Championship results ===
(key) (Races in bold indicate pole position) (Races in italics indicate fastest lap)

| Year | Entrant | 1 | 2 | 3 | 4 | 5 | 6 | 7 | 8 | 9 | 10 | 11 | 12 | 13 | 14 | 15 | 16 | 17 | 18 | Pos | Points |
|---|---|---|---|---|---|---|---|---|---|---|---|---|---|---|---|---|---|---|---|---|---|
| 2018 | RP Motorsport | EST; 1; 11 | EST; 2; 10 | LEC; 1; 5 | LEC; 2; 10 | | | | | | | | | | | | | | | 9th | 29 |
| 2018 | Fortec Motorsports | | | | | SPA; 1 Ret | SPA; 2; 15 | HUN; 1; 8 | HUN; 2; 13 | | | | | | | | | | | 9th | 29 |
| 2018 | Teo Martín Motorsport | | | | | | | | | SIL; 1; 11 | SIL; 2 Ret | MNZ; 1; 8 | MNZ; 2 Ret | JER; 1; 10 | JER; 2 Ret | CAT; 1 Ret | CAT; 2; 7 | | | 9th | 29 |
| 2019 | Teo Martín Motorsport | LEC; 1 Ret | LEC; 2; 11 | PAU; 1; 8 | PAU; 2; 10 | HOC; 1 Ret | HOC; 2 Ret | SPA; 1; 14 | SPA; 2; 10 | HUN; 1; 11 | HUN; 2; 13 | RBR; 1; 8 | RBR; 2; 11 | SIL; 1 | SIL; 2 | CAT; 1 | CAT; 2 | MNZ; 1 | MNZ; 2 | 21st | 10 |

=== Complete Porsche Carrera Cup Italia results ===
(key) (Races in bold indicate pole position) (Races in italics indicate fastest lap)

| Year | Team | 1 | 2 | 3 | 4 | 5 | 6 | 7 | 8 | 9 | 10 | 11 | 12 | 13 | 14 | Pos | Points |
|---|---|---|---|---|---|---|---|---|---|---|---|---|---|---|---|---|---|
| 2019 | Ombra Racing | MNZ1; 1 | MNZ1; 2 | MIS1; 1 | MIS1; 2 | IMO1; 1 | IMO1; 2 | MUG; 1 | MUG; 2 | VLL; 1 Ret | VLL; 2; 8 | MIS2; 1; 6 | MIS2; 2; 7 | MNZ2; 1; 8 | MNZ2; 2; 11 | 16th | 17 |
| 2020 | Ombra Racing | MUG1; 1; 5 | MUG1; 2; 6 | MIS; 1 Ret | MIS; 2; 6 | IMO1; 1; 13 | IMO1; 2; 8 | **VLL**; **1**; 2 | VLL; 2; 5 | MUG2; 1; 6 | MUG2; 2; 3 | MNZ; 1; 4 | MNZ; 2; 1 | | | 4th | 89 |
| 2021 | Ombra Racing | MIS1; 1 Ret | MIS1; 2; 10 | MUG; 1; 4 | MUG; 2; 11 | IMO; 1; 14 | IMO; 2; 10 | VLL; 1; 11 | VLL; 2; 6 | FRA; 1; 15 | FRA; 2; 12 | MNZ; 1; 13 | MNZ; 2; 12 | | | 13th | 70 |
| 2022 | Raptor Engineering | IMO; 1; 10 | IMO; 2; 9 | MIS; 1; 9 | MIS; 2; 5 | MUG1; 1; 9 | MUG1; 2 Ret | VLL; 1 Ret | VLL; 2; 16 | MNZ; 1; 8 | MNZ; 2; 9 | MUG2; 1; 12 | MUG2; 2; 20 | | | 13th | 60 |
| 2023 | Dinamic Motorsport | MIS1; 1; 11 | MIS1; 2; 9 | VLL; 1; 4 | VLL; 2; 6 | MUG; 1; 11 | MUG; 2; 5 | MNZ; 1; 11 | MNZ; 2; 6 | MIS2; 1; 12 | MIS2; 2 Ret | IMO; 1; 14 | IMO; 2 Ret | | | 9th | 75 |
| 2024 | Dinamic Motorsport | MIS; 1; 5 | MIS; 2; 7 | IMO1; 1; 11 | IMO1; 2; 6 | MUG; 1; 31 | MUG; 2; 4 | IMO2; 1; 10 | IMO2; 2; 11 | VLL; 1; 6 | VLL; 2; 11 | MNZ; 1; 20 | MNZ; 2; 17 | | | 10th | 76 |
| 2025 | Dinamic Motorsport | MIS1; 1; 12 | MIS1; 2; 16 | VLL; 1; 2 | VLL; 2; 2 | MUG; 1; 9 | MUG; 2; 9 | IMO; 1; 14 | IMO; 2; 8 | MIS2; 1; 7 | MIS2; 2; 21 | MNZ; 1; 19 | MNZ; 2; 7 | | | 7th | 86 |
| 2026 | Target Srl | IMO; 1 Ret | IMO; 2; 7 | MIS1; 1; 4 | MIS1; 2; 3 | MNZ; 1; 4 | MNZ; 2; 2 | VAL; 1; 20 | VAL; 2; 4 | MIS2; 1; 17 | MIS2; 2; 7 | MUG; 1; 6 | MUG; 2; 6 | | | 5th | 118 |

=== Complete Porsche Supercup results ===
(key) (Races in bold indicate pole position) (Races in italics indicate fastest lap)

| Year | Team | 1 | 2 | 3 | 4 | 5 | 6 | 7 | 8 | DC | Points |
|---|---|---|---|---|---|---|---|---|---|---|---|
| 2023 | Dinamic GT | MON | RBR; 20 | SIL | HUN | SPA | ZND | ZND | MNZ | NC† | 0 |
| 2024 | Dinamic Motorsport SRL | IMO; 10 | MON; 19 | RBR; 13 | SIL; 22 | HUN; Ret | SPA; 21 | ZAN; 16 | MNZ; Ret | 17th | 13 |
| 2025 | Dinamic Motorsport | IMO; Ret | MON | CAT | RBR; 14 | SPA; 19 | HUN; 11 | ZAN; 19 | MNZ; 14 | 19th | 12 |
| 2026 | Target Competition | MON; 20 | CAT; 12 | RBR; 16 | SPA; 17 | HUN; Ret | ZAN; 17 | ZAN; 14 | MNZ; 5 | 17th | 16 |

^{†} As Festante was a guest driver, he was ineligible for points.
