= GT Cup Open Europe =

Sports car racing series

- Category: Grand tourer sportscars
- Country: International
- Inaugural season: 2019
- Drivers: 22 (2020)
- Teams: 9 (2020)
- Tyre suppliers: Michelin
- Drivers' champion: (Italy) Aldo Festante
- Teams' champion: (Spain) Baporo Motorsport
- Official website: www.gtcupopen.net

The GT Cup Open Europe is a grand tourer-style sports car racing series founded in 2019 by the Spanish GT Sport Organización. It is a support category to the International GT Open featuring FIA GT4-spec cars as well as eligible one-make category cars.

== Format ==
The series consists of events in various European countries which feature two races over a weekend. Each weekend the series hosts two 55 minute races with two separate qualifying sessions determining the grid order. There is a mandatory pit stop with a minimum time that must be abided by. During this pit stop, only the driver change may occur if the car is a two driver entry. Fuel may not be added and unless there is a puncture, no tires can be changed.

Usually this series supports the International GT Open as separate races on the same race weekends, but starting in 2020 due to low car counts, GT Sport decided to combine the two series' races if there were less than 9 GT Cup Open Europe entries.

== Regulations ==
Each race consists of a field of grand touring-style cars. Eligible models include all homologated FIA GT4 cars such as the Mercedes AMG GT4 and the Audi R8 LMS GT4 as well as one-make category cars such as the Lamborghini Huracán Super Trofeo and the Porsche 991 Carrera Cup. The series has three sub-categories for the Drivers' Championships: Silver, for driver pairings consisting of two Silver ranked drivers; Pro-Am, for driver pairings consisting of one Gold or Silver driver and one Am driver; and Am, for two Am rated drivers or a solo Am rated driver. No other driver combinations are allowed. After the third race of the season, all Silver ranked entries were moved to the Pro-Am category apparently in an attempt to remove the category due to very few entries. The Silver category did not continue in 2020.

== Champions ==
=== Current Categories ===
==== Overall ====
Season	Drivers	Team	Tyre	Poles	Wins	Podiums	Points	Clinched	Margin
2019	(Switzerland) Hans-Peter Koller	(Italy) Vincenzo Sospiri Racing	M	6	6	7	102	Race 12 of 12	2
2020	(Italy) Aldo Festante	(Italy) Ombra Racing	M	4	8	9	130	Race 9 of 10	20
2021	(Poland) Maciej Błażek (Poland) Mateusz Lisowski	(Poland) A&P Racing	M					Race ? of ?	
2022	(Belgium) Jan Lauryssen	(Belgium) Q1-Trackracing	M					Race ? of ?	
2023	(Spain) Ivan Velasco (Spain) Jorge Cabezas Catalán	(Germany) Mertel Motorsport	M					Race ? of ?	
2024	(Spain) Ivan Velasco (Germany) Luca Ludwig	(Germany) Mertel Mortorsport	M					Race ? of ?	
2025	(Guatemala) Ian Rodriguez (Italy) Luca Franca	(Italy) FAEMS Team	M					Race ? of ?	
2026	(Netherlands) Jurriaan de Back (Netherlands) Paul Meijer	(Netherlands) Hans Weijs Motorsport	M					Race ? of ?	

==== Pro-Am ====
Season	Drivers	Team	Tyre	Poles	Wins	Podiums	Points	Clinched	Margin
2019	(Switzerland) Hans-Peter Koller	(Italy) Vincenzo Sospiri Racing	M	6	6	7	65	Race 12 of 12	5
2020	(Italy) Aldo Festante	(Italy) Ombra Racing	M	5	8	9	44	Race 9 of 10	27
2021	(Poland) Maciej Błażek (Poland) Mateusz Lisowski	(Poland) A&P Racing	M					Race ? of ?	
2022	(Belgium) Jan Lauryssen	(Belgium) Q1-Trackracing	M					Race ? of ?	
2023	(Spain) Ivan Velasco (Spain) Jorge Cabezas Catalán	(Germany) Mertel Motorsport	M					Race ? of ?	
2024	(Spain) Ivan Velasco (Germany) Luca Ludwig	(Germany) Mertel Mortorsport	M					Race ? of ?	
2025	(Netherlands) Laura van den Hengel (Netherlands) Paul Meijer	(Netherlands) Hans Weijs Motorsport	M					Race ? of ?	
2026	(Spain) Alejandro Barambio (Spain) Borja García	(Spain) GT Corse	M					Race ? of ?	

==== Am ====
Season	Drivers	Team	Tyre	Poles	Wins	Podiums	Points	Clinched	Margin
2019	(Switzerland) Niki Leutwiler	(Switzerland) PZ Oberer Zurischee	M	5	3	9	80	Race 12 of 12	11
2020	(Andorra) Manuel Cerqueda (Spain) Daniel Díaz-Varela	(Spain) Baporo Motorsport	M	5	8	10	59	Race 9 of 10	27
2021	(Brazil) Fernando Fortes	(United Kingdom) Three-Sixty Racing Team	M					Race ? of ?	
2022	(Belgium) John de Wilde	(Belgium) Q1-Trackracing	M					Race ? of ?	
2023	(Belgium) Xander Przybylak (Belgium) Laurent Vandervelde	(Belgium) Q1-Trackracing	M					Race ? of ?	
2024	(Brazil) Leandro Martins (Austria) Dieter Svepes	(Portugal) Racar Motorsport	M					Race ? of ?	
2025	(Brazil) Leandro Martins (Austria) Dieter Svepes	(Portugal) LMR Motorsport	M					Race ? of ?	
2026	(Brazil) Leandro Martins (Austria) Dieter Svepes	(Portugal) LMR Motorsport	M					Race ? of ?	

==== Silver ====
Season	Drivers	Team	Tyre	Poles	Wins	Podiums	Points	Clinched	Margin
2019	(Spain) Marc de Fulgencio (Brazil) Thiago Vivacqua	(Spain) Teo Martín Motorsport	M	1	2	3	13	Race 12 of 12	12

=== Teams ===
Season	Teams' Championship
2019	(Italy) Vincenzo Sospiri Racing
2020	(Spain) Baporo Motorsport
2021	
2022	(Belgium) Q1-Trackracing
2023	(Belgium) Q1-Trackracing
2024	(Germany) Mertel Motorsport
2025	(Italy) FAEMS Team
2026	(Netherlands) Hans Weijs Motorsport

== Circuits ==
- **Bold** denotes a circuit will be used in the 2026 season.
- **Italic** denotes a future circuit will be used in the 2027 season.

Number	Circuits	Rounds	Years
1	(France) **Circuit Paul Ricard**	8	2019–present
1	(Belgium) **Circuit de Spa-Francorchamps**	8	2019–present
1	(Spain) **Circuit de Barcelona-Catalunya**	8	2019–present
1	(Italy) **Monza Circuit**	8	2019–present
5	(Hungary) **Hungaroring**	4	2019–2022, 2027
5	(Portugal) **Algarve International Circuit**	4	2023–2026
7	(Germany) Hockenheimring	2	2024–2025
8	(United Kingdom) Silverstone Circuit	1	2019
8	(Italy) **Misano World Circuit**	1	2026–2027
