= Barcelona Formula 2 round =

(Spain) Barcelona Formula 2 round

FIA Formula 2 Championship
- Venue: Circuit de Barcelona-Catalunya
- Location: Montmeló, Catalonia, Spain
- First race: 2017
- Most wins (driver): (Brazil) Felipe Drugovich (3)
- Most wins (team): (Netherlands) MP Motorsport (France) ART Grand Prix (both 5)
- Lap record: 1:27.474 ( (France) Clément Novalak, Trident, Dallara F2 2018, 2023)

2022 (Note: Older layout of the Circuit de Barcelona-Catalunya, which held F2 races in 2022.)
- Lap record: 1:34.231 ( (Australia) Jack Doohan, Virtuosi Racing, Dallara F2 2018, 2022)

2017–2020 (Note: Older layout of the Circuit de Barcelona-Catalunya, which held F2 races in 2017–2020.)
- Lap record: 1:30.039 ( (Canada) Nicholas Latifi, DAMS, Dallara F2 2018, 2018)

The Barcelona Formula 2 round is a FIA Formula 2 Championship series race that is run on the Circuit de Barcelona-Catalunya in Montmeló, Catalonia, Spain.

== Winners ==
Year	Race	Driver	Team	Report
2017	Feature	(Monaco) Charles Leclerc	Prema Racing	Report
2017	Sprint	(Japan) Nobuharu Matsushita	ART Grand Prix	Report
2018	Feature	(United Kingdom) George Russell	ART Grand Prix	Report
2018	Sprint	(United Kingdom) Jack Aitken	ART Grand Prix	Report
2019	Feature	(Italy) Luca Ghiotto	UNI-Virtuosi	Report
2019	Sprint	(Canada) Nicholas Latifi	DAMS	Report
2020	Feature	(Japan) Nobuharu Matsushita	MP Motorsport	Report
2020	Sprint	(Brazil) Felipe Drugovich	MP Motorsport	Report
2022	Sprint	(Brazil) Felipe Drugovich	MP Motorsport	Report
2022	Feature	(Brazil) Felipe Drugovich	MP Motorsport	Report
2023	Sprint	(Denmark) Frederik Vesti	Prema Racing	Report
2023	Feature	(United Kingdom) Oliver Bearman	Prema Racing	Report
2024	Sprint	(France) Victor Martins	ART Grand Prix	Report
2024	Feature	(United States) Jak Crawford	DAMS Lucas Oil	Report
2025	Sprint	(Netherlands) Richard Verschoor	MP Motorsport	Report
2025	Feature	(United Kingdom) Arvid Lindblad	Campos Racing	Report
2026	Sprint	(India) Kush Maini	ART Grand Prix	Report
2026	Feature	(Brazil) Rafael Câmara	Invicta Racing	Report

== See also ==
- Spanish Grand Prix
- Barcelona-Catalunya Grand Prix
- Catalunya GP2 round
