= Catalunya GP2 round =

Auto race in Spain

(Spain) Catalunya GP2 round

GP2 Series
- Venue: Circuit de Catalunya
- Location: Montmeló, Catalonia, Spain
- First race: 2005
- Last race: 2016
- Most wins (driver): (France) Charles Pic (Switzerland) Fabio Leimer (United Kingdom) Alex Lynn (2)
- Most wins (team): (United Kingdom) Arden International (France) DAMS (4)
- Lap record: 1:29.989 ( (Japan) Kazuki Nakajima, DAMS, GP2/05, 2007)

2005–2006 (Note: Older layout of the Circuit de Catalunya, which held GP2 race in 2005–2006.)
- Lap record: 1:25.550 ( (Spain) Adrián Vallés, Campos Racing, GP2/05, 2006)

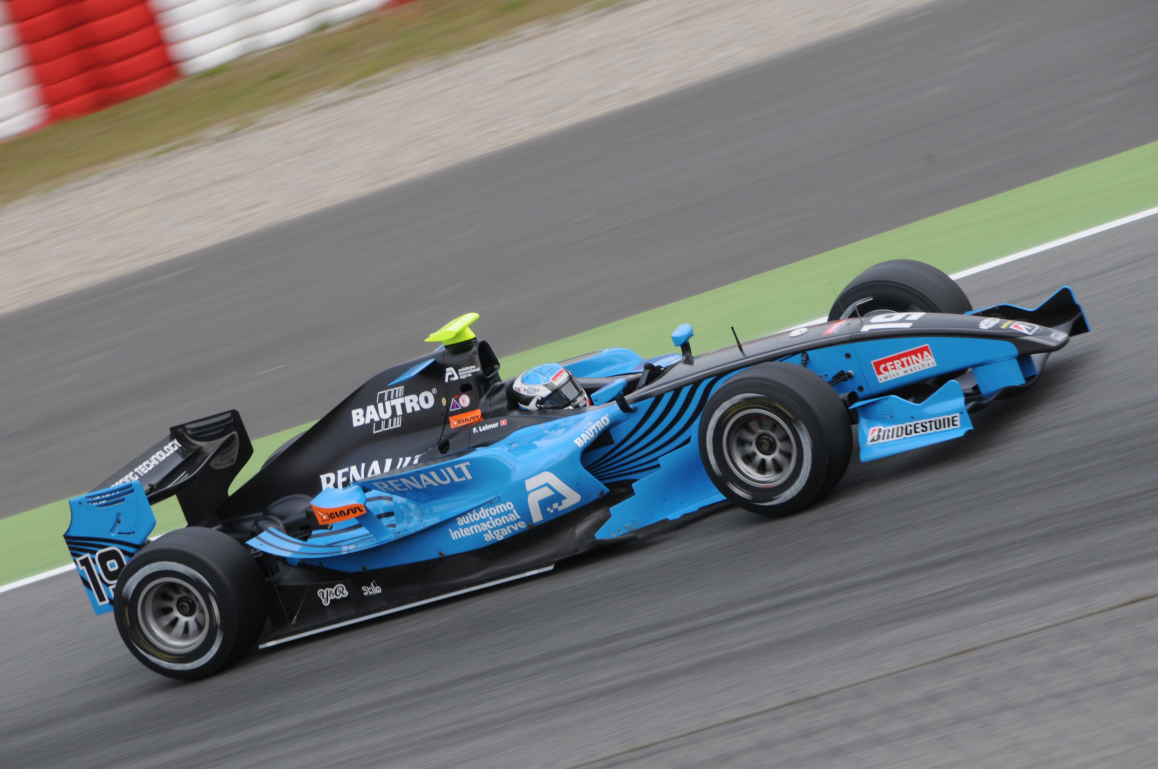
Fabio Leimer in 2010.

The Catalunya GP2 round was a GP2 Series race that ran from on the Circuit de Catalunya track in Montmeló, Catalonia, Spain.

== Winners ==
Year	Race	Driver	Team	Report
2005	Feature	(Italy) Gianmaria Bruni	Coloni Motorsport	Report
2005	Sprint	(Argentina) José María López	DAMS	Report
2006	Feature	(France) Alexandre Prémat	ART Grand Prix	Report
2006	Sprint	(Venezuela) Ernesto Viso	iSport International	Report
2007	Feature	(Brazil) Bruno Senna	Arden International	Report
2007	Sprint	(Germany) Timo Glock	iSport International	Report
2008	Feature	(Portugal) Álvaro Parente	Super Nova Racing	Report
2008	Sprint	(Japan) Kamui Kobayashi	DAMS	Report
2009	Feature	(France) Romain Grosjean	Barwa Campos Team	Report
2009	Sprint	(Italy) Edoardo Mortara	Telmex Arden International	Report
2010	Feature	(France) Charles Pic	Arden International	Report
2010	Sprint	(Switzerland) Fabio Leimer	Ocean Racing Technology	Report
2011	Feature	(France) Charles Pic	Barwa Addax Team	Report
2011	Sprint	(Switzerland) Fabio Leimer	Rapax	Report
2012	Feature	(Netherlands) Giedo van der Garde	Caterham Racing	Report
2012	Sprint	(Brazil) Luiz Razia	Arden International	Report
2013	Feature	(Netherlands) Robin Frijns	Hilmer Motorsport	Report
2013	Sprint	(Monaco) Stefano Coletti	Rapax	Report
2014	Feature	(Venezuela) Johnny Cecotto Jr.	Trident	Report
2014	Sprint	(Brazil) Felipe Nasr	Carlin	Report
2015	Feature	(Belgium) Stoffel Vandoorne	ART Grand Prix	Report
2015	Sprint	(United Kingdom) Alex Lynn	DAMS	Report
2016	Feature	(France) Norman Nato	Racing Engineering	Report
2016	Sprint	(United Kingdom) Alex Lynn	DAMS	Report

== See also ==
- Spanish Grand Prix
- Barcelona Formula 2 round
