= 2020 Porsche Carrera Cup Italia =

Motor racing competition

The 2020 Porsche Carrera Cup Italia season was the 14th Porsche Carrera Cup Italy season. The six-race season began on 18 July in Mugello and ended on 8 November at Monza.

== Calendar ==
All races were held in Italy.

| Round | Circuit | Date |
|---|---|---|
| 1 | Autodromo Internazionale del Mugello | 18–19 July |
| 2 | Misano World Circuit Marco Simoncelli | 1–2 August |
| 3 | Autodromo Internazionale Enzo e Dino Ferrari | 29–30 August |
| 4 | Autodromo Vallelunga Piero Taruffi | 19–20 September |
| 5 | Autodromo Internazionale del Mugello | 3–4 October |
| 6 | Autodromo Nazionale di Monza | 7–8 November |

== Teams and drivers ==
| Team | No. | Drivers | Class | Rounds |
|---|---|---|---|---|
| (Italy) Bonaldi Motorsport | 3 | (Italy) Marzio Moretti | | 2–6 |
| (Italy) Ebimotors | 5 | (Italy) Riccardo Pera | | 6 |
| (Italy) Ebimotors | 70 | (Italy) Giuanluca Giorgi | M | 6 |
| (Italy) AB Racing | 6 | (Italy) Alberto Cerqui | | All |
| (Italy) AB Racing | 30 | (Italy) Benedetto Strignano | | 4–6 |
| (Italy) AB Racing | 68 | (Italy) Piergiacomo Randazzo | M | 1–5 |
| (Italy) Dinamic Motorsport (Italy) Team Q8 Hi Performance | 7 | (Switzerland) Stefano Monaco | | All |
| (Italy) Dinamic Motorsport (Italy) Team Q8 Hi Performance | 8 | (Italy) David Fumanelli | | All |
| (Italy) Dinamic Motorsport (Italy) Team Q8 Hi Performance | 9 | (Italy) Lodovico Laurini | | All |
| (Italy) Dinamic Motorsport (Italy) Team Q8 Hi Performance | 28 | (Italy) Nicola Baldan | | All |
| (Italy) Ombra Racing | 11 | (Italy) Leonardo Caglioni | | All |
| (Italy) Ombra Racing | 12 | (Sweden) Emil Skärås | | All |
| (Italy) Ombra Racing | 15 | (Italy) Aldo Festante | | All |
| (Italy) Enrico Fulgenzi Racing | 17 | (Italy) Enrico Fulgenzi | | 4 |
| (Italy) Enrico Fulgenzi Racing | 51 | (Italy) Gianfranco Bronzini | S | 4 |
| (Italy) Enrico Fulgenzi Racing | 61 | (United States) Ray Calvin | M | 4 |
| (Italy) Enrico Fulgenzi Racing | 66 | (Italy) Gabriele Rindone | M | 4 |
| (Italy) Raptor Engineering | 23 | (Italy) Giovanni Altoé | | 1–4 |
| (Italy) Raptor Engineering | 23 | (Italy) Giacomo Luigi Barri | | 5–6 |
| (San Marino) Tsunami RT | 32 | (Italy) Gianmarco Quaresmini | | All |
| (San Marino) Tsunami RT | 77 | (Italy) Pablo Biolghini | S | 1–4, 6 |
| (San Marino) Tsunami RT | 77 | (Italy) Carlo Scarpellini | S | 1–2, 4, 6 |
| (San Marino) Tsunami RT | 89 | (United Arab Emirates) Bashar Mardini | M | All |
| (Italy) Ghinzani Arco Motorsport | 38 | (Italy) Simone Iaquinta | | All |
| (Italy) Ghinzani Arco Motorsport | 57 | (Italy) Davide Scannicchio | M | 2 |
| (Italy) Ghinzani Arco Motorsport | 57 | (Italy) Walter Palazzo | M | 3–4 |
| (Italy) Ghinzani Arco Motorsport | 57 | (Italy) Diego Giuseppe Mercurio | M | 5 |
| (Italy) Ghinzani Arco Motorsport | 58 | (Italy) Stefano Bianconi | S | All |
| (Italy) Ghinzani Arco Motorsport | 58 | (Italy) Diego Giuseppe Mercurio | S | 1–2 |
| (San Marino) GDL Racing | 40 | (North Macedonia) Risto Vukov | | All |
| (San Marino) GDL Racing | 69 | (Italy) Massimiliano Montagnese | S | All |
| (San Marino) GDL Racing | 69 | (Italy) Massimiliano Donzelli | S | 1–5 |
| (San Marino) GDL Racing | 84 | (Argentina) Andrés Josephson | M | 3 |
| (San Marino) GDL Racing | 84 | (Italy) Massimiliano Donzelli | M | 6 |
| (San Marino) Team Malucelli | 59 | (Italy) Marco Parisini | S | 1–5 |
| (San Marino) Team Malucelli | 60 | (San Marino) Marco Galassi | M | All |
| (Austria) SVC Sport Management | 72 | (Italy) Diego Locanto | M | 1–3, 5–6 |
| (Italy) Krypton Motorsport | 88 | (Italy) Luca Pastorelli | M | All |

| Icon | Class |
|---|---|
| M | Michelin Cup |
| S | Silver Cup |

== Results ==
Bold indicates the overall winner.

| Round | | Circuit | Pro | Michelin Cup | Silver |
|---|---|---|---|---|---|
| 1 | R1 | Autodromo Internazionale del Mugello | (Italy) **No.6 AB Racing** | (San Marino) No.89 Tsunami RT | (San Marino) No.69 GDL Racing |
| 1 | R1 | Autodromo Internazionale del Mugello | (Italy) **Alberto Cerqui** | (United Arab Emirates) Bashar Mardini | (Italy) Massimilian Montagnese |
| 1 | R2 | Autodromo Internazionale del Mugello | (Italy) **No.38 Ghinzani Arco Motorsport** | (San Marino) No.89 Tsunami RT | (Italy) No.58 Ghinzani Arco Motorsport |
| 1 | R2 | Autodromo Internazionale del Mugello | (Italy) **Simone Iaquinta** | (United Arab Emirates) Bashar Mardini | (Italy) Diego Mercurio |
| 2 | R1 | Misano World Circuit Marco Simoncelli | (San Marino) **No.32 Tsunami RT** | (Italy) No.88 Krypton Motorsport | (San Marino) No.77 Tsunami RT |
| 2 | R1 | Misano World Circuit Marco Simoncelli | (Italy) **Gianmarco Quaresmini** | (Italy) Luca Pastorelli | (Italy) Pablo Biolghini |
| 2 | R2 | Misano World Circuit Marco Simoncelli | (Italy) **No.38 Ghinzani Arco Motorsport** | (Italy) No.68 AB Racing | (San Marino) No.77 Tsunami RT |
| 2 | R2 | Misano World Circuit Marco Simoncelli | (Italy) **Simone Iaquinta** | (Italy) Piergiacomo Randazzo | (Italy) Carlo Scarpellini |
| 3 | R1 | Autodromo Internazionale Enzo e Dino Ferrari | (Italy) **No.8 Team Q8 Hi Performance** | (San Marino) No.89 Tsunami RT | (Italy) No.58 Ghinzani Arco Motorsport |
| 3 | R1 | Autodromo Internazionale Enzo e Dino Ferrari | (Italy) **David Fumanelli** | (United Arab Emirates) Bashar Mardini | (Italy) Stefano Bianconi |
| 3 | R2 | Autodromo Internazionale Enzo e Dino Ferrari | (San Marino) **No.32 Tsunami RT** | (San Marino) No.89 Tsunami RT | (Italy) No.58 Ghinzani Arco Motorsport |
| 3 | R2 | Autodromo Internazionale Enzo e Dino Ferrari | (Italy) **Gianmarco Quaresmini** | (United Arab Emirates) Bashar Mardini | (Italy) Stefano Bianconi |
| 4 | R1 | Autodromo Vallelunga Piero Taruffi | (San Marino) **No.32 Tsunami RT** | (San Marino) No.89 Tsunami RT | (San Marino) No.77 Tsunami RT |
| 4 | R1 | Autodromo Vallelunga Piero Taruffi | (Italy) **Gianmarco Quaresmini** | (United Arab Emirates) Bashar Mardini | (Italy) Pablo Biolghini |
| 4 | R2 | Autodromo Vallelunga Piero Taruffi | (Italy) **No.38 Ghinzani Arco Motorsport** | (San Marino) No.89 Tsunami RT | (Italy) No.58 Ghinzani Arco Motorsport |
| 4 | R2 | Autodromo Vallelunga Piero Taruffi | (Italy) **Simone Iaquinta** | (United Arab Emirates) Bashar Mardini | (Italy) Stefano Bianconi |
| 5 | R1 | Autodromo Internazionale del Mugello | (Italy) **No.6 AB Racing** | (Italy) No.88 Krypton Motorsport | (Italy) No.58 Ghinzani Arco Motorsport |
| 5 | R1 | Autodromo Internazionale del Mugello | (Italy) **Alberto Cerqui** | (Italy) Luca Pastorelli | (Italy) Stefano Bianconi |
| 5 | R2 | Autodromo Internazionale del Mugello | (Italy) **No.38 Ghinzani Arco Motorsport** | (San Marino) No.89 Tsunami RT | (Italy) No.58 Ghinzani Arco Motorsport |
| 5 | R2 | Autodromo Internazionale del Mugello | (Italy) **Simone Iaquinta** | (United Arab Emirates) Bashar Mardini | (Italy) Stefano Bianconi |
| 6 | R1 | Autodromo Nazionale di Monza | (Italy) **No.8 Team Q8 Hi Performance** | (Italy) No.88 Krypton Motorsport | (San Marino) No.77 Tsunami RT |
| 6 | R1 | Autodromo Nazionale di Monza | (Italy) **David Fumanelli** | (Italy) Luca Pastorelli | (Italy) Pablo Biolghini |
| 6 | R2 | Autodromo Nazionale di Monza | (Italy) **No.15 Ombra Racing** | (San Marino) No.89 Tsunami RT | (San Marino) No.77 Tsunami RT |
| 6 | R2 | Autodromo Nazionale di Monza | (Italy) **Aldo Festante** | (United Arab Emirates) Bashar Mardini | (Italy) Carlo Scarpellini |
Results:

== Standings ==
=== Overall ===
| Pos. | Driver | MUG | | MIS | | IMO | | VLL | | MUG | | MNZ | | Points |
| Pos. | Driver | R1 | R2 | R1 | R2 | R1 | R2 | R1 | R2 | R1 | R2 | R1 | R2 | Points |
|---|---|---|---|---|---|---|---|---|---|---|---|---|---|---|
| 1 | (Italy) Simone Iaquinta | 4 | 1 | 3 | 1 | 2 | 3 | 5 | 1 | 5 | 1 | 16 | 2 | 141 |
| 2 | (Italy) David Fumanelli | 3 | 4 | 5 | 3 | 1 | 5 | 6 | 4 | 4 | 2 | 1 | 3 | 138 |
| 3 | (Italy) Gianmarco Quaresmini | 2 | 2 | 1 | 11 | 6 | 1 | 1 | 3 | 19 | 8 | 2 | Ret | 126 |
| 4 | (Italy) Aldo Festante | 5 | 6 | Ret | 6 | 13 | 8 | 2 | 5 | 6 | 3 | 4 | 1 | 89 |
| 5 | (Italy) Alberto Cerqui | 1 | 7 | 4 | 14 | 4 | Ret | 7 | 6 | 1 | 7 | 8 | 7 | 87 |
| 6 | (Switzerland) Stefano Monaco | 6 | 3 | 2 | 19 | 3 | 2 | 9 | 8 | 8 | 9 | 11 | 4 | 73 |
| 7 | (Italy) Marzio Moretti | | | 6 | 5 | 5 | 4 | 10 | 7 | 9 | 5 | 9 | Ret | 45 |
| 8 | (Italy) Nicola Baldan | 10 | 8 | 21 | 4 | 7 | 7 | 11 | 10 | 2 | 4 | 25 | DSQ | 42 |
| 9 | (Italy) Lodovico Laurini | 7 | 5 | 20 | Ret | 8 | 6 | 8 | 9 | 3 | 10 | 23 | 8 | 39 |
| 10 | (Sweden) Emil Skärås | 11 | Ret | 8 | 2 | 11 | 10 | 4 | Ret | Ret | 12 | 6 | 5 | 37 |
| Pos. | Driver | R1 | R2 | R1 | R2 | R1 | R2 | R1 | R2 | R1 | R2 | R1 | R2 | Points |
| Pos. | Driver | MUG | | MIS | | IMO | | VLL | | MUG | | MNZ | | Points |
