= 2003 FIA GT Barcelona 500km =

Layout of the Circuit de Catalunya (1995-2003)

The 2003 FIA GT Barcelona 500 km was the opening round the 2003 FIA GT Championship. It took place at the Circuit de Catalunya, Spain, on 6 April 2003.

== Official results ==
Class winners in bold. Cars failing to complete 70% of winner's distance marked as Not Classified (NC).

Pos	Class	No	Team	Drivers	Chassis	Tyre	Laps
Pos	Class	No	Team	Drivers	Engine	Tyre	Laps
1	**GT**	**23**	**(Italy) BMS Scuderia Italia**	**(Italy) Matteo Bobbi (Italy) Thomas Biagi**	**Ferrari 550-GTS Maranello**	MI	**96**
1	**GT**	**23**	**(Italy) BMS Scuderia Italia**	**(Italy) Matteo Bobbi (Italy) Thomas Biagi**	**Ferrari 5.9L V12**	MI	**96**
2	GT	22	(Italy) BMS Scuderia Italia	(Italy) Fabrizio Gollin (Italy) Luca Cappellari	Ferrari 550-GTS Maranello	MI	96
2	GT	22	(Italy) BMS Scuderia Italia	(Italy) Fabrizio Gollin (Italy) Luca Cappellari	Ferrari 5.9L V12	MI	96
3	GT	21	(United Kingdom) Care Racing (Italy) BMS Scuderia Italia	(Italy) Stefano Livio (Switzerland) Lilian Bryner (Switzerland) Enzo Calderari	Ferrari 550-GTS Maranello	MI	95
3	GT	21	(United Kingdom) Care Racing (Italy) BMS Scuderia Italia	(Italy) Stefano Livio (Switzerland) Lilian Bryner (Switzerland) Enzo Calderari	Ferrari 5.9L V12	MI	95
4	GT	15	(United Kingdom) Lister Storm Racing	(Italy) Andrea Piccini (Switzerland) Jean-Denis Délétraz	Lister Storm	D	95
4	GT	15	(United Kingdom) Lister Storm Racing	(Italy) Andrea Piccini (Switzerland) Jean-Denis Délétraz	Jaguar 7.0L V12	D	95
5	GT	6	(United Kingdom) Creation Autosportif	(United Kingdom) Bobby Verdon-Roe (United Kingdom) Peter Snowdon	Lister Storm	D	95
5	GT	6	(United Kingdom) Creation Autosportif	(United Kingdom) Bobby Verdon-Roe (United Kingdom) Peter Snowdon	Jaguar 7.0L V12	D	95
6	GT	11	(Sweden) Roos Optima Racing Team	(Sweden) Henrik Roos (Sweden) Magnus Wallinder	Chrysler Viper GTS-R	D	94
6	GT	11	(Sweden) Roos Optima Racing Team	(Sweden) Henrik Roos (Sweden) Magnus Wallinder	Chrysler 8.0L V10	D	94
7	GT	18	(Netherlands) Zwaan's Racing	(Netherlands) Arjan van der Zwaan (Netherlands) Rob van der Zwaan (Germany) Klaus Abbelen	Chrysler Viper GTS-R	D	93
7	GT	18	(Netherlands) Zwaan's Racing	(Netherlands) Arjan van der Zwaan (Netherlands) Rob van der Zwaan (Germany) Klaus Abbelen	Chrysler 8.0L V10	D	93
8	**N-GT**	**52**	**(France) JMB Racing**	**(Italy) Andrea Bertolini (Italy) Fabrizio de Simone**	**Ferrari 360 Modena GT**	P	**93**
8	**N-GT**	**52**	**(France) JMB Racing**	**(Italy) Andrea Bertolini (Italy) Fabrizio de Simone**	**Ferrari 3.6L V8**	P	**93**
9	N-GT	88	(United Kingdom) Team Maranello Concessionaires	(United Kingdom) Tim Mullen (United Kingdom) Jamie Davies	Ferrari 360 Modena GT	D	92
9	N-GT	88	(United Kingdom) Team Maranello Concessionaires	(United Kingdom) Tim Mullen (United Kingdom) Jamie Davies	Ferrari 3.6L V8	D	92
10	N-GT	89	(United Kingdom) Team Maranello Concessionaires	(United Kingdom) Darren Turner (United Kingdom) Kelvin Burt	Ferrari 360 Modena N-GT	D	92
10	N-GT	89	(United Kingdom) Team Maranello Concessionaires	(United Kingdom) Darren Turner (United Kingdom) Kelvin Burt	Ferrari 3.6L V8	D	92
11	GT	2	(Germany) Konrad Motorsport	(Austria) Franz Konrad (Switzerland) Toni Seiler	Saleen S7-R	D	92
11	GT	2	(Germany) Konrad Motorsport	(Austria) Franz Konrad (Switzerland) Toni Seiler	Ford 7.0L V8	D	92
12	N-GT	58	(France) Auto Palace Compétition	(France) Steeve Hiesse (France) Guillaume Gomez	Ferrari 360 Modena GT	P	92
12	N-GT	58	(France) Auto Palace Compétition	(France) Steeve Hiesse (France) Guillaume Gomez	Ferrari 3.6L V8	P	92
13	N-GT	99	(Germany) RWS Yukos Motorsport	(Austria) Walter Lechner, Jr. (France) Stéphane Daoudi	Porsche 911 GT3-R	P	92
13	N-GT	99	(Germany) RWS Yukos Motorsport	(Austria) Walter Lechner, Jr. (France) Stéphane Daoudi	Porsche 3.6L Flat-6	P	92
14	N-GT	57	(Czech Republic) MenX	(Czech Republic) Tomáš Enge (Czech Republic) Robert Pergl	Ferrari 360 Modena GT	D	91
14	N-GT	57	(Czech Republic) MenX	(Czech Republic) Tomáš Enge (Czech Republic) Robert Pergl	Ferrari 3.6L V8	D	91
15	GT	7	(United Kingdom) Graham Nash Motorsport	(United Kingdom) Mike Newton (Brazil) Thomas Erdos	Saleen S7-R	D	91
15	GT	7	(United Kingdom) Graham Nash Motorsport	(United Kingdom) Mike Newton (Brazil) Thomas Erdos	Ford 7.0L V8	D	91
16	N-GT	77	(Germany) RWS Yukos Motorsport	(Russia) Nikolai Fomenko (Russia) Alexey Vasilyev	Porsche 911 GT3-RS	P	90
16	N-GT	77	(Germany) RWS Yukos Motorsport	(Russia) Nikolai Fomenko (Russia) Alexey Vasilyev	Porsche 3.6L Flat-6	P	90
17	N-GT	54	(United Kingdom) Cirtek Motorsport	(United Kingdom) Mark Mayall (Italy) Marco Zadra	Porsche 911 GT3-R	D	90
17	N-GT	54	(United Kingdom) Cirtek Motorsport	(United Kingdom) Mark Mayall (Italy) Marco Zadra	Porsche 3.6L Flat-6	D	90
18	N-GT	74	(United Kingdom) Team Eurotech	(United Kingdom) Mike Jordan (United Kingdom) Mark Sumpter	Porsche 911 GT3-RS	D	90
18	N-GT	74	(United Kingdom) Team Eurotech	(United Kingdom) Mike Jordan (United Kingdom) Mark Sumpter	Porsche 3.6L Flat-6	D	90
19	GT	12	(Germany) Proton Competition	(Germany) Christian Ried (Germany) Gerold Ried	Porsche 911 GT2	Y	90
19	GT	12	(Germany) Proton Competition	(Germany) Christian Ried (Germany) Gerold Ried	Porsche 3.6L Turbo Flat-6	Y	90
20	N-GT	53	(France) JMB Racing	(France) Antoine Gosse (Netherlands) Peter Kutemann	Ferrari 360 Modena N-GT	P	89
20	N-GT	53	(France) JMB Racing	(France) Antoine Gosse (Netherlands) Peter Kutemann	Ferrari 3.6L V8	P	89
21	N-GT	56	(Poland) Alda Motorsport	(Poland) Andrzej Dziurka (Poland) Wojciech Dobrzanski	Porsche 911 GT3-RS	D	88
21	N-GT	56	(Poland) Alda Motorsport	(Poland) Andrzej Dziurka (Poland) Wojciech Dobrzanski	Porsche 3.6L Flat-6	D	88
22	N-GT	64	(Italy) AB Motorsport	(Italy) Renato Premoli (Italy) Bruno Barbaro (Italy) Antonio De Castro	Porsche 911 GT3-RS	P	87
22	N-GT	64	(Italy) AB Motorsport	(Italy) Renato Premoli (Italy) Bruno Barbaro (Italy) Antonio De Castro	Porsche 3.6L Flat-6	P	87
23	N-GT	62	(Spain) G-Tec	(United Kingdom) Richard Kaye (Russia) Rustem Teregulov	Porsche 911 GT3-R	D	86
23	N-GT	62	(Spain) G-Tec	(United Kingdom) Richard Kaye (Russia) Rustem Teregulov	Porsche 3.6L Flat-6	D	86
24	N-GT	63	(Spain) Motor Competición	(Spain) Luis Villalba (Spain) Francesc Gutiérrez	Porsche 911 GT3-RS	D	76
24	N-GT	63	(Spain) Motor Competición	(Spain) Luis Villalba (Spain) Francesc Gutiérrez	Porsche 3.6L Flat-6	D	76
25 DNF	GT	8	(United Kingdom) Graham Nash Motorsport	(Portugal) Miguel Ramos (Portugal) Ni Amorim (Portugal) Pedro Chaves	Saleen S7-R	D	64
25 DNF	GT	8	(United Kingdom) Graham Nash Motorsport	(Portugal) Miguel Ramos (Portugal) Ni Amorim (Portugal) Pedro Chaves	Ford 7.0L V8	D	64
26 DNF	GT	1	(France) Larbre Compétition	(France) Christophe Bouchut (France) Jean-Philippe Belloc	Chrysler Viper GTS-R	MI	55
26 DNF	GT	1	(France) Larbre Compétition	(France) Christophe Bouchut (France) Jean-Philippe Belloc	Chrysler 8.0L V10	MI	55
27 DNF	N-GT	50	(Germany) Freisinger Motorsport	(Germany) Marc Lieb (Germany) Sascha Maassen	Porsche 911 GT3-RS	D	52
27 DNF	N-GT	50	(Germany) Freisinger Motorsport	(Germany) Marc Lieb (Germany) Sascha Maassen	Porsche 3.6L Flat-6	D	52
28 DNF	N-GT	51	(Germany) Freisinger Motorsport	(Belgium) Bert Longin (Switzerland) Gabriele Gardel	Porsche 911 GT3-RS	D	48
28 DNF	N-GT	51	(Germany) Freisinger Motorsport	(Belgium) Bert Longin (Switzerland) Gabriele Gardel	Porsche 3.6L Flat-6	D	48
29 DNF	GT	16	(Germany) Wieth Racing	(Germany) Wolfgang Kaufmann (Germany) Niko Wieth (Italy) Vittorio Zoboli	Ferrari 550 Maranello	D	47
29 DNF	GT	16	(Germany) Wieth Racing	(Germany) Wolfgang Kaufmann (Germany) Niko Wieth (Italy) Vittorio Zoboli	Ferrari 6.0L V12	D	47
30 DNF	GT	14	(United Kingdom) Lister Storm Racing	(United Kingdom) Jamie Campbell-Walter (United Kingdom) Nathan Kinch	Lister Storm	D	44
30 DNF	GT	14	(United Kingdom) Lister Storm Racing	(United Kingdom) Jamie Campbell-Walter (United Kingdom) Nathan Kinch	Jaguar 7.0L V12	D	44
31 DNF	GT	9	(France) JMB Racing	(Austria) Philipp Peter (Italy) Fabio Babini	Ferrari 550 Maranello	P	40
31 DNF	GT	9	(France) JMB Racing	(Austria) Philipp Peter (Italy) Fabio Babini	Ferrari 6.0L V12	P	40
32 DNF	GT	4	(Switzerland) Force One Racing Festina	(France) Philippe Alliot (France) David Hallyday (Switzerland) Steve Zacchia	Chrysler Viper GTS-R	P	36
32 DNF	GT	4	(Switzerland) Force One Racing Festina	(France) Philippe Alliot (France) David Hallyday (Switzerland) Steve Zacchia	Chrysler 8.0L V10	P	36
33 DNF	GT	5	(Switzerland) Force One Racing Festina (Netherlands) Carsport Holland	(Netherlands) Mike Hezemans (Belgium) Anthony Kumpen	Chrysler Viper GTS-R	P	25
33 DNF	GT	5	(Switzerland) Force One Racing Festina (Netherlands) Carsport Holland	(Netherlands) Mike Hezemans (Belgium) Anthony Kumpen	Chrysler 8.0L V10	P	25
34 DNF	N-GT	55	(United Kingdom) Cirtek Motorsport	(United Kingdom) Ian Khan (United Kingdom) Adam Jones	Porsche 911 GT3-R	D	19
34 DNF	N-GT	55	(United Kingdom) Cirtek Motorsport	(United Kingdom) Ian Khan (United Kingdom) Adam Jones	Porsche 3.6L Flat-6	D	19
35 DNF	N-GT	61	(United Kingdom) EMKA Racing	(United Kingdom) Martin Short (United Kingdom) Tim Sugden	Porsche 911 GT3-R	D	11
35 DNF	N-GT	61	(United Kingdom) EMKA Racing	(United Kingdom) Martin Short (United Kingdom) Tim Sugden	Porsche 3.6L Flat-6	D	11
DNS	GT	10	(France) JMB Racing	(France) Boris Derichebourg (France) David Terrien (Italy) Christian Pescatori	Ferrari 550 Maranello	P	–
DNS	GT	10	(France) JMB Racing	(France) Boris Derichebourg (France) David Terrien (Italy) Christian Pescatori	Ferrari 6.0L V12	P	–
DNS	N-GT	75	(United Kingdom) Team Eurotech	(United Kingdom) David Jones (United Kingdom) Godfrey Jones	Porsche 911 GT3-R	D	–
DNS	N-GT	75	(United Kingdom) Team Eurotech	(United Kingdom) David Jones (United Kingdom) Godfrey Jones	Porsche 3.6L Flat-6	D	–

== Statistics ==
- Pole position – #14 Lister Storm Racing – 1:40.975
- Fastest lap – #1 Larbre Compétition – 1:45.081
- Average speed – 150.790 km/h

FIA GT Championship
Previous race: None	2003 season	Next race: 2003 FIA GT Magny-Cours 500km
