= Circuit de Barcelona-Catalunya =

Motorsport race track in Spain

- Grand Prix Circuit without Chicane (2021–present)

- Grand Prix Circuit with Chicane (2021–present)
- Location: Montmeló, Barcelona, Catalonia, Spain
- Coordinates: 41°34′12″N 2°15′40″E
- Capacity: 140,700
- FIA Grade: 1 (2 layouts); 2 (2 layouts); 6R (Rallycross)
- Broke ground: 24 February 1989; 37 years ago
- Opened: 10 September 1991; 35 years ago
- Former names: Circuit de Catalunya (1991–2013)
- Major events: Current: Formula One; Barcelona-Catalunya Grand Prix (2026); Spanish Grand Prix (1991–2025); Grand Prix motorcycle racing Catalan motorcycle Grand Prix (1996–present); Solidarity motorcycle Grand Prix (2024); European motorcycle Grand Prix (1992–1995); FIA World Endurance Championship; 6 Hours of Barcelona (2026); European Le Mans Series; 4 Hours of Barcelona (2008–2009, 2019, 2021–present); 24H Series; 24 Hours of Barcelona (1998–2009, 2011–2019, 2021–present); GT World Challenge Europe (2017–present); TCR Europe (2018–2023, 2025–present); Ferrari Challenge Finali Mondiali (2026); Future: IndyCar Series; IndyCar Grand Prix of Barcelona (2027); Former: FIA World RX; World RX of Catalunya (2015–2022); World SBK (2020–2024); DTM (2006–2009); FIA GT (2003); Summer Olympics (1992); Summer Paralympics (1992)
- Website: circuitcat.com

Grand Prix Circuit without Chicane (2021–present)
- Length: 4.657 km (2.894 mi)
- Turns: 14
- Race lap record: 1:15.743 ( (Australia) Oscar Piastri, McLaren MCL39, 2025, F1)

Grand Prix Circuit with Chicane (2021–present)
- Length: 4.675 km (2.905 mi)
- Turns: 16
- Race lap record: 1:18.149 ( (Netherlands) Max Verstappen, Red Bull Racing RB16B, 2021, F1)

Grand Prix Circuit (2007–2020) & Motorcycle Circuit (2016–2017)
- Length: 4.655 km (2.892 mi)
- Turns: 16
- Race lap record: 1:18.183 ( (Finland) Valtteri Bottas, Mercedes W11, 2020, F1)

Motorcycle Circuit (2018–2020) & Grand Prix Circuit (2004–2006)
- Length: 4.627 km (2.875 mi)
- Turns: 14
- Race lap record: 1:15.641 ( (Italy) Giancarlo Fisichella, Renault R25, 2005, F1)

Motorcycle Circuit (1995–2016) & Grand Prix Circuit (1995–2003)
- Length: 4.730 km (2.939 mi)
- Turns: 13
- Race lap record: 1:20.143 ( (Brazil) Rubens Barrichello, Ferrari F2003-GA, 2003, F1)

Original Layout with Nissan Chicane (1994)
- Length: 4.745 km (2.948 mi)
- Turns: 16
- Race lap record: 1:25.155 ( (Germany) Michael Schumacher, Benetton B194, 1994, F1)

Original Layout (1991–1993)
- Length: 4.747 km (2.950 mi)
- Turns: 14
- Race lap record: 1:20.989 ( (Germany) Michael Schumacher, Benetton B193, 1993, F1)

The Circuit de Barcelona-Catalunya (Catalan pronunciation: [siɾˈkujd də bəɾsəˈlonə kətəˈluɲə]) is a 4.657 km (2.894 mi) motorsport race track in Montmeló, Barcelona, Catalonia, Spain. With long straights and a variety of corners, the Circuit de Barcelona-Catalunya is seen as an all-rounder circuit. The track has stands with a capacity of 140,700. The circuit has an FIA Grade 1 license.

Until 2013 the track was known only as the Circuit de Catalunya, before a sponsorship deal with Barcelona City Council added Barcelona to the track's title.

== History ==
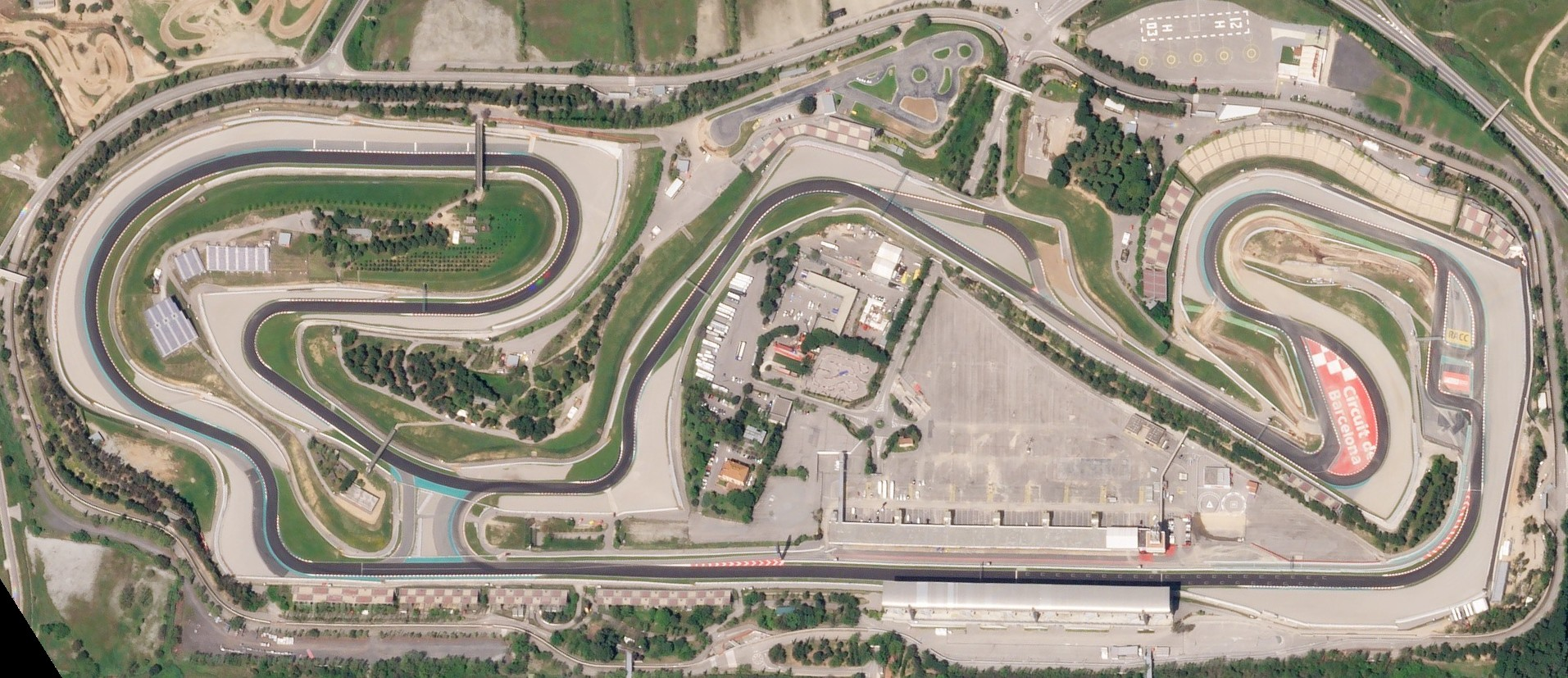
Satellite picture of the circuit in 2018

The Circuit de Barcelona-Catalunya was built in 1991 and began hosting the Formula One Spanish Grand Prix that same year. Construction also coincided with the Olympic Games and Paralympic Games scheduled to take place in Barcelona the next year, where the circuit acted as the start and finish line for the road team time trial cycling event and road team time trial para-cycling event. The Circuit de Barcelona-Catalunya should not be confused with the Montjuïc circuit, which hosted the Spanish Grand Prix four times between 1969 and 1975 and, unlike the Circuit de Barcelona-Catalunya, is actually located within the city of Barcelona.

The Circuit de Barcelona-Catalunya has hosted a motorcycle Grand Prix since 1992, originally the European motorcycle Grand Prix from 1992 and later the Catalan motorcycle Grand Prix since 1996. It hosted two rounds in 2024, with the season-ending one-off Solidarity motorcycle Grand Prix replacing Valencia because of flooding in the Valencia area.

The circuit hosted many other international racing series, including the FIA Sportscar Championship (1999–2002), European Touring Car Championship (2003), FIA GT Championship (2003), Deutsche Tourenwagen Masters (2006–2009), European Le Mans Series (2008–2009, 2019, 2021–present), and World Series Formula V8 3.5 (2002–2004, 2006–2013, 2016), GT World Challenge Europe (2017–present), 24h de Barcelona Trofeu Fermí Vélez, and FIA World Rallycross Championship (World RX of Catalunya; 2015–2022). For the latter, the layout included parts of the permanent track near turns 11–15, with two additional gravel sections.

Since 2016, the racetrack hosts the 24h BiCircuit Festival, an ultra-distance cycling event featuring 24-hour, 12-hour and 6-hour races for soloists and relay teams up to 8 riders.

Because so much testing is done at this circuit, Formula One drivers and mechanics are extremely familiar with it. This has led to criticism that drivers and mechanics are too familiar with Catalunya, reducing the amount of on-track action. For the 2020 Formula One season Liberty Media expected the calendar would consist of twenty-one Grands Prix and that any new races would come at the expense of existing events, in particular the Dutch Grand Prix in Zandvoort replacing the Spanish Grand Prix on Circuit de Barcelona, but later negotiated an agreement with the teams to allow up to twenty-two Grands Prix, salvaging the Spanish Grand Prix. Before 2021 season, the circuit's F1 deal was extended for one more year.

However, in November 2021, the circuit's F1 deal was extended to 2026, with 2025 as the last year the Spanish Grand Prix was held here. For the 2026 season, the Spanish Grand Prix moved to a new circuit in Madrid around the IFEMA Exhibition Centre in Campo de las Naciones. As a result, the Barcelona-Catalunya Grand Prix was held instead. Barcelona-Catalunya signed a multi-year extension to keep Formula One race in 2028, 2030, and 2032, rotating with the Belgian Grand Prix.

The track was resurfaced in 2018 as a result of calls by MotoGP riders to improve the amount of grip on the surface. Previously the track had been resurfaced in 2004.

Barcelona has the 3-star FIA Environmental Accreditation and the ISO 14001 certification. In a 2021 report, it was ranked the second most sustainable racetrack in the world, together with Circuit Paul Ricard and behind Mugello Circuit.

== Racing history ==
The circuit has been the site of some memorable moments. In 1991, Ayrton Senna and Nigel Mansell went down the entire front straight side by side while dueling for second place, with Mansell eventually taking the position and ultimately the race itself. In 1994, Michael Schumacher managed to finish in second place despite driving over half the race with only fifth gear. In 1996, Schumacher took his first win as a Ferrari driver, after a dominant performance during a torrential rainstorm. In 2001, Mika Häkkinen suffered a clutch failure while leading the race on the last lap, handing the win to Schumacher. At the 2006 event, Fernando Alonso became the first Spanish Formula One driver to win at his home country's track. In 2016, a crash at turn four took Mercedes drivers Lewis Hamilton and Nico Rosberg out, allowing Red Bull's Max Verstappen to win the race on his first race for the team. Doing so, Verstappen was the youngest to win a race, the youngest driver to stand on the podium, and the youngest to lead a lap of a race, in addition to being the first Dutchman to win a Formula One race.

In 2008, Heikki Kovalainen left the track at 240 km/h (150 mph) after a wheel rim failure at turn 9. He managed to decelerate to 130 km/h (81 mph) when he hit the tyre barrier. He was temporarily unconscious and suffered a minor concussion, but a few minutes later, spectators were relieved when he gave a thumbs up.

The circuit has been the scene of two debut wins in Formula One. Pastor Maldonado took his first and only Grand Prix victory and podium here in 2012, and in 2016 Max Verstappen won his first Grand Prix. As a result, he became the youngest driver to ever win an F1 Grand Prix race.

At the 2009 motorcycle Grand Prix, teammates Valentino Rossi and Jorge Lorenzo fought all race long for first place, culminating in an overtake on the final corner by Rossi. Riders and pundits described the race as "historic" and "genius".

On 3 June 2016, during Moto2 Free Practice for the 2016 Catalan motorcycle Grand Prix, Luis Salom crashed in turn 12, resulting in the session being red-flagged. After being transferred to the local Hospital General de Catalunya, Salom died of the injuries sustained in the crash. Upon hearing this, FIM decided to change the current layout of the track to the same layout as the one used in Formula One. After off-season discussions, the FIM announced that the track layout would be slightly modified in that the chicane would be moved up a few metres.

On 17 May 2026, during the 2026 Catalan motorcycle Grand Prix, Álex Márquez crashed at the back of Pedro Acosta's KTM in turn 9, causing his bike to flip over and disintegrate into pieces. The race was red-flagged because of the debris caused by the accident, as one of the tyres from the bike crashed into Fabio Di Giannantonio's bike. After a first re-start, Francesco Bagnaia, Luca Marini and Johann Zarco crashed in turn 1, with Zarco's left leg stuck in Bagnaia's Desmosedici GP26.

== Layout ==
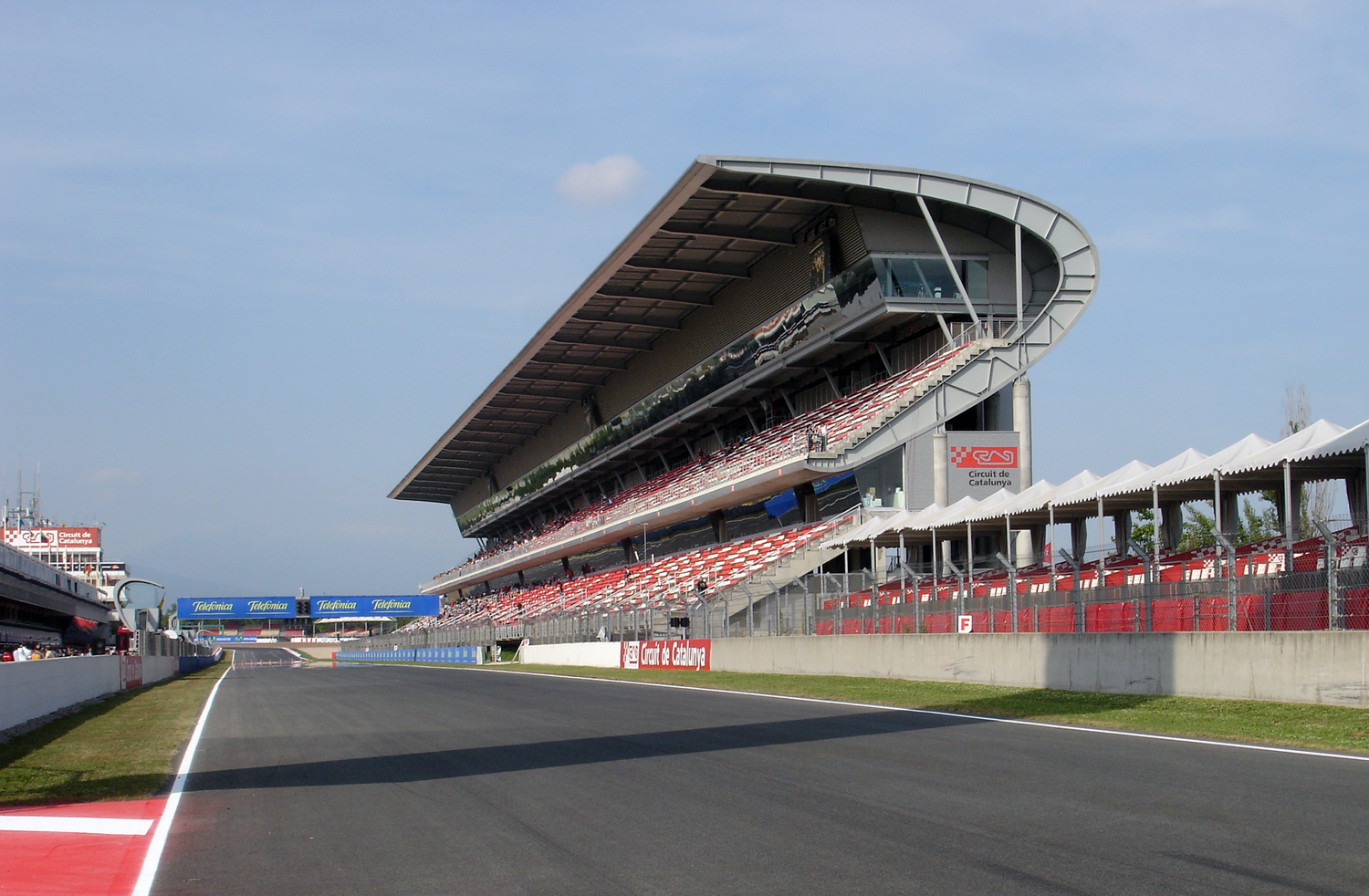
The start line

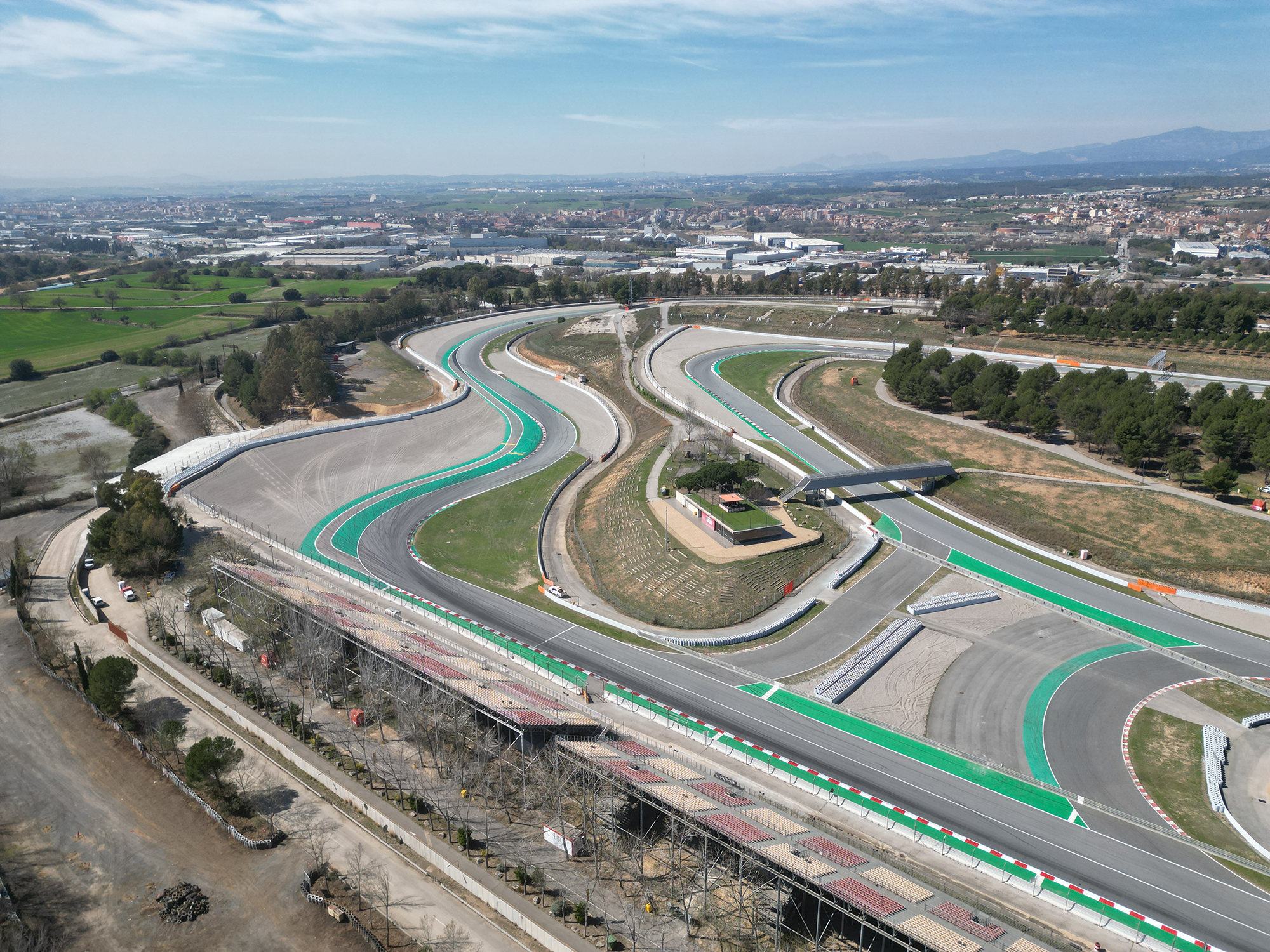
Turns 1–6

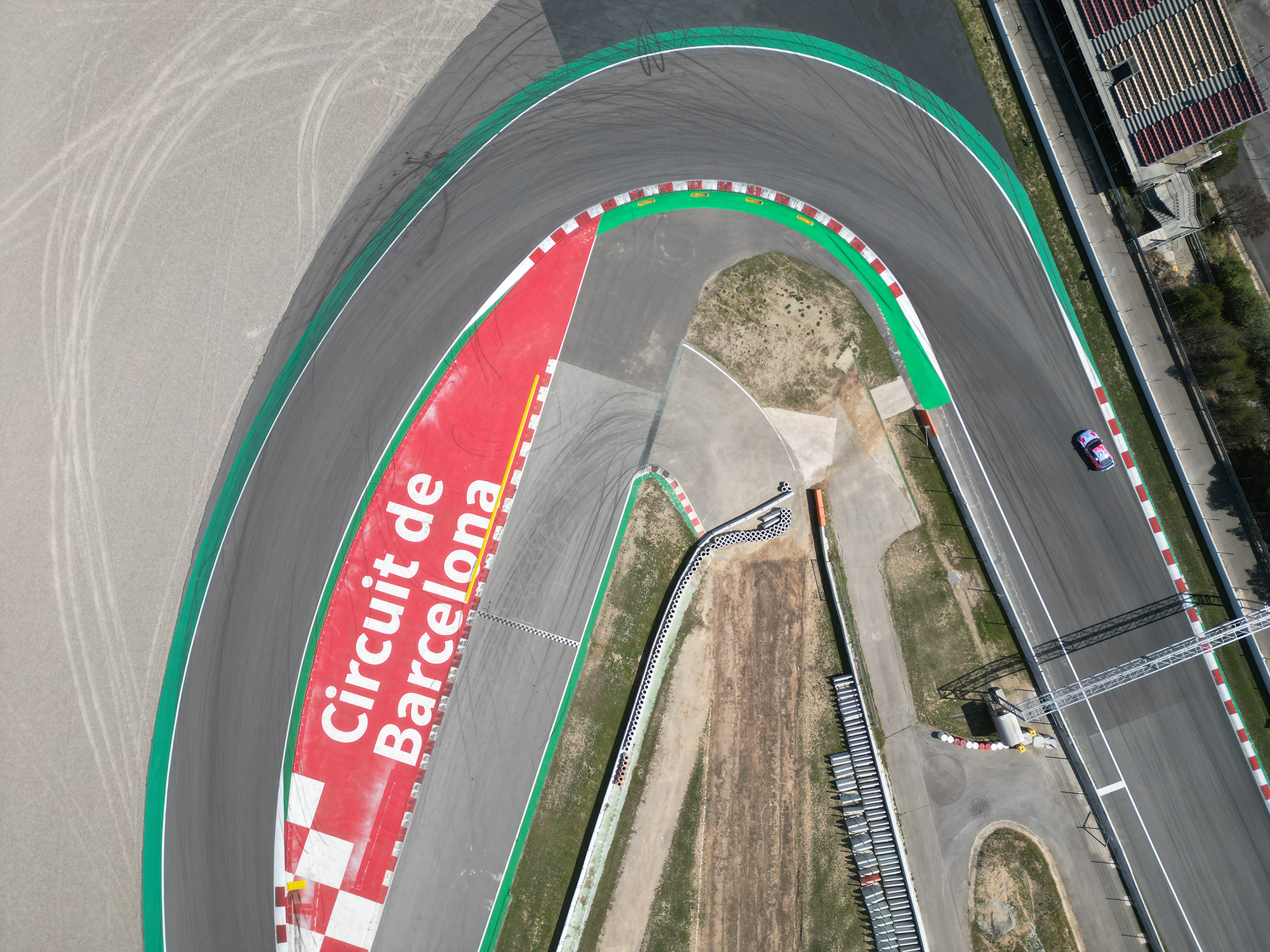
Turn 10

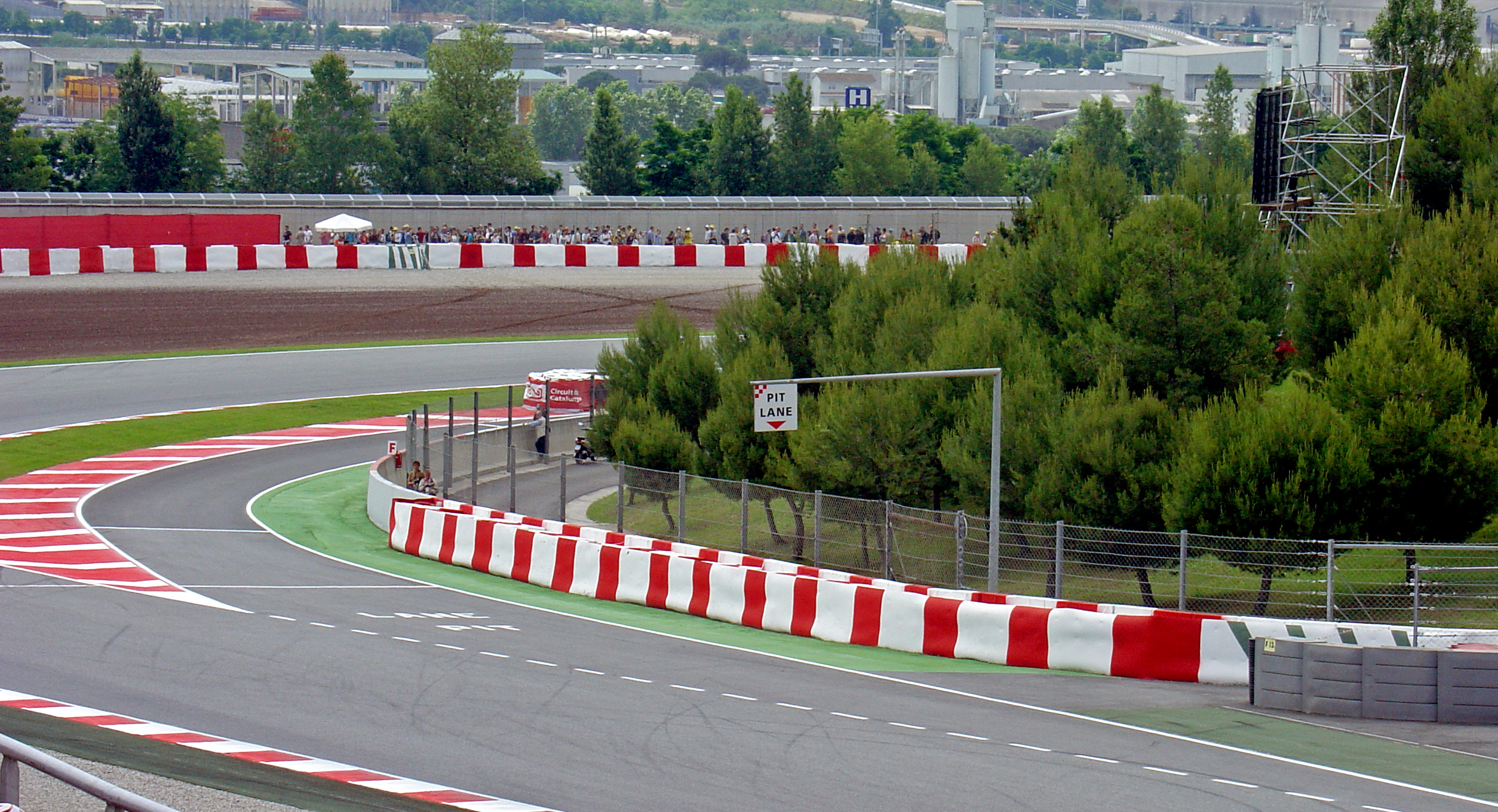
Pit lane entrance

The track is demanding of a car's aerodynamic qualities. The wind direction at the circuit can change drastically during the day, a significant factor given the importance of aerodynamics to modern Formula One cars. It is then difficult to find a good setup since cars can have massive aerodynamic drag and understeer on one part of the circuit in the morning, but suffer oversteer at the same part of the circuit in the afternoon. A given tyre compound can work well when tested, but not so well a couple of months later. These changeable conditions can make for unexpected performances from some teams during the race. The changeable wind conditions have also caused accidents at the circuit, with Fernando Alonso's testing accident in 2015 partly blamed on the severity of the wind.

In Formula 1, Turn 1 is arguably the most popular place for overtaking. When first used, overtaking was frequent as cars could follow closely through the last two corners and slipstream down the long straight. As aerodynamic balance became more critical in the 2000s and 2010s, this overtaking method drastically decreased as the cars were unable to follow each other through the fast final corner due to turbulence created by the leading car.

In motorcycling, riders are known to overtake in at least five points on the track (turns 1–2, 4, 5, 10 and 14).

=== Layout changes ===
The 2007 season saw the first of the two final sweepers replaced with a slow chicane to reduce speeds through the final corner, where serious accidents could occur, and in an effort to improve overtaking. However, it has been criticised for failing to achieve the latter aim and for causing congestion during qualifying sessions.

From the 2023 Spanish Grand Prix, Formula One stopped using the 2007 chicane, therefore reverting the final corners for Formula One cars to a sweeping fast configuration.

Through 2015, MotoGP used the layout used the 1995–2003 version of the Grand Prix circuit. This was originally the same layout as Formula One. For 2004, a new, slower La Caixa turn was built; the motorcycles continued to use the old version, and they also ignored the shorter Europcar turn and RACC chicane. At the 2016 edition, Moto2 rider Luis Salom, had a fatal crash in turn 12. Race control immediately switched to the Formula One layout for qualifying and race.

On 15 December 2016, the FIM announced that a new chicane was to be built ahead of the car chicane, to prevent riders from cutting the pit lane entrance. However, during the 2017 race, the new chicane was deemed dangerous by riders because of a surface change, and the car chicane was used during that event.

In December 2017. grandstands were removed in turn 12 to create additional runoff that allowed the FIM to eliminate that chicane (although the Turn 10 hairpin was kept). Also, the new La Caixa hairpin was used instead of the long sweeper, eliminating the chicane.

For 2021, the La Caixa hairpin was remodelled again, slower than the original one but faster than the F1 one. The alterations were done to improve safety for the drivers.

=== A lap in a Formula One car ===
A 1,047 m (1,145 yd) long pit straight leads them into turn 1 which is the main overtaking point at Catalunya, as it is a braking zone at the end of a long DRS straight. The inside and outside are equally difficult for overtaking; drivers who can hold the line around the outside of turn one, can get the inside line for turn two. The corners themselves make up a medium-speed chicane – drivers brake rather late for turn one (Elf) and shift down to gear two, and turn two is almost full throttle as they try to gain as much exit speed as possible. Turn 3 (Renault) is a long, flat-out (in most cars) right-hander that has a g-force of about four, and it leads to a short straight before turn 4, the Repsol curve. Another right-hander, turn four is similar to Monza's Curva Parabolica – drivers brake and take an early apex (in third gear), carrying great speed out of the exit. Turn 5 (Seat) comes immediately after and is a slow left-hander taken in second gear which drops rapidly downhill towards the left kink of turn 6 which is ignored by F1 cars. Turns 7 and 8 make up a medium-speed, uphill, left-right chicane. Drivers brake and shift down to gear three, and must not run too wide as turn eight has a large kerb on its apex which could potentially damage cars' suspensions. Turn 9, Campsa Corner, is a very fast, sixth-gear right-hander which is made incredibly difficult by being completely blind (drivers cannot see the apex on approach). It is initially quite steep uphill but the exit is then downhill, so it is quite easy to run wide onto the astroturf. The long back straight leads into turn 10 (La Caixa), a third-gear, left-hand corner, then turns 11 and 12, a left kink before a long, slow, third-gear right. Turn 13 and 14, a very fast, sixth-gear double right-hander which takes cars across the start/finish line.

=== Current layouts ===
Grand Prix Circuit without Chicane (2021–present)

Grand Prix Circuit with Chicane (2021–present)

Rallycross Circuit (2015–present)

=== Previous layouts ===
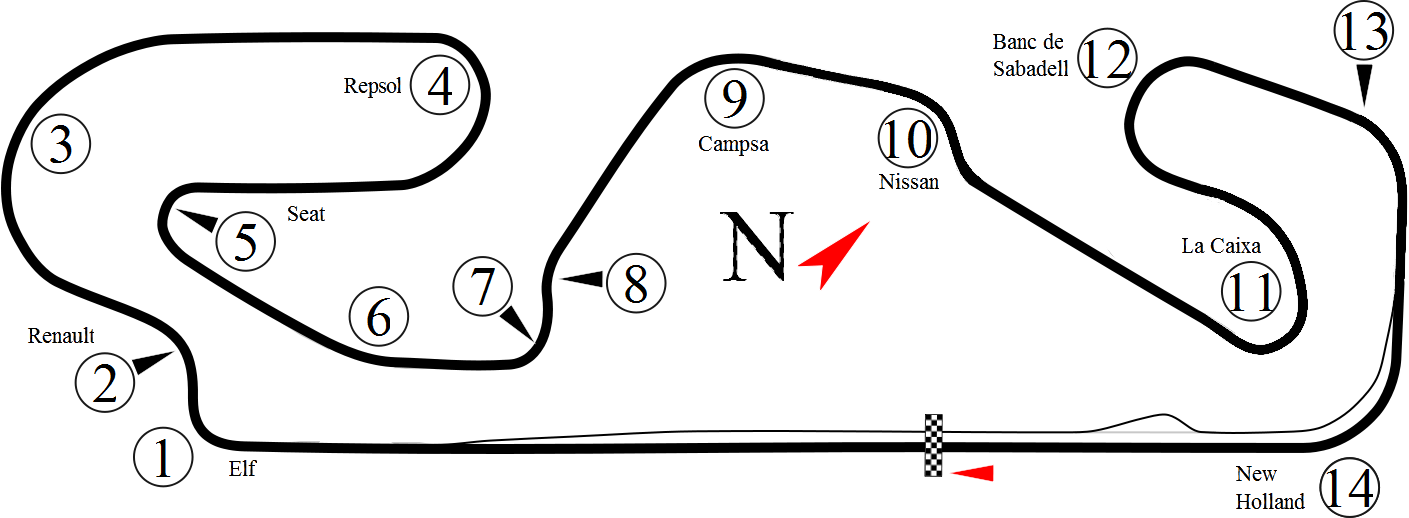
Original Grand Prix Circuit (1991–1994)

Grand Prix Circuit (1995–2003) & Motorcycle Circuit (1995–2016)

Grand Prix Circuit (2004–2006) & Motorcycle Circuit (2018–2020)

Grand Prix Circuit (2007–2020) & Motorcycle Circuit (2016–2017)

== Events ==
Current

- 27–28 February: Porsche Sprint Challenge Southern Europe
- 12–15 March: Formula Winter Series, GT Winter Series, GT4 Winter Series, Prototype Winter Series
- 27–29 March: Classic Endurance Racing Espíritu de Montjuïc
- 10–12 April: European Le Mans Series 4 Hours of Barcelona, Le Mans Cup, Porsche Carrera Cup France, Ligier European Series
- 15–17 May: Grand Prix motorcycle racing Catalan motorcycle Grand Prix
- 23–24 May: FIM Moto3 Junior World Championship, FIM Moto2 European Championship, Moto4 European Cup
- 12–14 June: Formula One Barcelona-Catalunya Grand Prix, FIA Formula 2 Championship Barcelona Formula 2 round, FIA Formula 3 Championship, Porsche Supercup
- 11–12 July: Barcelona motorcycle 24 Hours
- 18–20 September: 24H Series 24 Hours of Barcelona, Radical Cup Europe, TCR Europe Cup, Radical World Finals
- 2–4 October: GT World Challenge Europe Festival de la Velocidad de Barcelona, Lamborghini Super Trofeo Europe, GT3 Revival Series, McLaren Trophy Europe
- 16–18 October: FIA World Endurance Championship 6 Hours of Barcelona
- 23–25 October: International GT Open, Euroformula Open Championship, GT Cup Open Europe, TCR Europe Touring Car Series
- 5–8 November: GB3 Championship, Eurocup-3, F4 Spanish Championship, TCR Spain Touring Car Championship
- 17–23 November: Ferrari Challenge Finali Mondiali, Ferrari Challenge Europe, Ferrari Challenge North America

Future

- French F4 Championship (2010, 2016–2017, 2027)
- Formula Regional European Championship (2019–2025, 2027)
- GT4 European Series (2021–2023, 2025, 2027)
- Harley-Davidson Bagger World Cup (2027)
- IndyCar Series
  - IndyCar Grand Prix of Barcelona (2027)
- Italian F4 Championship (2024–2025, 2027)
- Lamborghini Super Trofeo Asia (2027)
- Lamborghini Super Trofeo North America (2027)
- Lamborghini Super Trofeo World Finals (2027)
- Prototype Cup Europe (2027)

Former

- Alpine Elf Cup Series (2018–2019, 2021–2024)
- Deutsche Tourenwagen Masters (2006–2009)
- Euro 4 Championship (2023)
- EuroBOSS Series (2007)
- Eurocup Clio (2011–2013)
- Eurocup Mégane Trophy (2006–2013)
- European Le Mans Series
  - 1000 km of Catalunya (2008–2009)
- European Touring Car Championship (2003)
- European Truck Racing Championship (1996–1999, 2002, 2004–2009)
- Euroseries 3000 (2006–2008)
- F1 Academy (2023–2024)
- FFSA GT Championship (2017–2018)
- FIA European Rallycross Championship (2015–2022)
- FIA Formula Two Championship (2009, 2011)
- FIA GT Championship
  - Barcelona 500km (2003)
- FIA Sportscar Championship (1999–2002)
- FIA World Rallycross Championship
  - World RX of Catalunya (2015–2022)
- Formula 3 Euro Series (2006–2009)
- Formula Abarth (2011)
- Formula BMW ADAC (2007)
- Formula BMW Europe (2008–2010)
- Formula One
  - Spanish Grand Prix (1991–2025)
- Formula Renault 2.0 Alps (2012)
- Formula Renault 2.0 West European Cup (1997, 2007–2009)
- Formula Renault Eurocup (1993–1997, 2006–2013, 2017–2020)
- Formula Renault V6 Eurocup (2003)
- GP2 Series
  - Catalunya GP2 round (2005–2016)
- GP3 Series (2010–2018)
- Grand Prix motorcycle racing
  - European motorcycle Grand Prix (1992–1995)
  - Solidarity motorcycle Grand Prix (2024)
- GT2 European Series (2015–2019, 2021, 2024–2025)
- International Formula 3000 (1992, 1994–1995, 1998–2004)
- MotoE World Championship
  - Catalan eRace (2021, 2023–2025)
- Porsche Carrera Cup Benelux (2017, 2019, 2022)
- Porsche Carrera Cup Germany (2006–2009)
- Renault Clio Cup Europe (2021–2024)
- SEAT León Eurocup (2014–2016)
- Sidecar World Championship (1994–1996)
- Spanish Superbike Championship (2019–2024)
- Superbike World Championship (2020–2024)
- Supersport 300 World Championship (2020–2024)
- Supersport World Championship (2020–2024)
- Trofeo Maserati (2003, 2005)
- V de V Challenge Monoplace (2012–2018)
- World Series Formula V8 3.5 (1998–2004, 2006–2013, 2016)
- W Series (2022)

== Lap records ==
As of November 2026, the fastest official race lap records at the Circuit de Barcelona-Catalunya are listed as:

Category	Time	Driver	Vehicle	Event
Grand Prix Circuit without Chicane (2021–present): 4.657 km (2.894 mi)
F1	1:15.743	Oscar Piastri	McLaren MCL39	2025 Spanish Grand Prix
FIA F2	1:27.474	Clément Novalak	Dallara F2 2018	2023 Barcelona Formula 2 round
LMP2	1:30.174	Alessio Rovera	Oreca 07	2024 4 Hours of Barcelona
FIA F3	1:31.964	Pepe Martí	Dallara F3 2019	2023 Barcelona Formula 3 round
Euroformula Open	1:32.278	Charlie Wurz	Dallara 320	2023 Barcelona Euroformula Open round
LMH	1:32.379	Kamui Kobayashi	Toyota TR010 Hybrid	2026 6 Hours of Barcelona
LMDh	1:32.809	Charles Milesi	Alpine A424	2026 6 Hours of Barcelona
Eurocup-3	1:33.383	Keanu Al Azhari	Dallara 326	2026 Barcelona Eurocup-3 round
GB3	1:35.538	Aurelia Nobels	Tatuus MSV GB3-025	2026 Barcelona GB3 round
Formula Regional	1:36.703	Esteban Masson	Tatuus F3 T-318-EC3	2023 Barcelona Eurocup-3 round
LMP3	1:36.735	David Droux	Ligier JS P320	2023 Barcelona Le Mans Cup round
MotoGP	1:39.664	Pedro Acosta	KTM RC16	2024 Catalan motorcycle Grand Prix
GT3	1:40.449	Dominik Baumann	Mercedes-AMG GT3 Evo	2025 Barcelona International GT Open round
World SBK	1:40.955	Nicolò Bulega	Ducati Panigale V4 R	2024 Barcelona World SBK round
LM GTE	1:41.371	Alessio Picariello	Porsche 911 RSR-19	2023 4 Hours of Barcelona
Moto2	1:41.943	Celestino Vietti	Boscoscuro B-26	2026 Catalan motorcycle Grand Prix
Formula 4	1:42.131	Christian Ho	Tatuus F4-T421	2023 Barcelona F4 Spanish Championship round
SRO GT2	1:42.334	Ronnie Bremer	KTM X-Bow GT2	2023 Barcelona GT Winter Series round
Lamborghini Super Trofeo	1:42.899	Amaury Bonduel	Lamborghini Huracán Super Trofeo Evo2	2024 Barcelona GT Winter Series round
Porsche Carrera Cup	1:43.233	Hjelte Hoffner	Porsche 911 (992 I) GT3 Cup	2026 Barcelona Porsche Sprint Challenge Southern Europe round
Radical Cup	1:43.476	Gregg Gorski	Radical SR10	2026 Radical World Finals
Ferrari Challenge	1:43.545	Johnny Kaminskey	Ferrari 296 Challenge	2026 Barcelona Ferrari Challenge North America round
JS P4	1:43.784	Jerónimo Berrío	Ligier JS P4	2024 Barcelona Ligier European Series round
World SSP	1:44.875	Yari Montella	Ducati Panigale V2	2024 Barcelona World SSP round
Moto3	1:46.748	José Antonio Rueda	KTM RC250GP	2024 Catalan motorcycle Grand Prix
MotoE	1:48.025	Óscar Gutiérrez	Ducati V21L	2024 Catalan motorcycle Grand Prix
GT4	1:49.089	McKenzy Cresswell	McLaren Artura GT4	2026 Barcelona GT4 Winter Series round
TCR Touring Car	1:50.073	Ruben Volt	Honda Civic Type R TCR (FL5)	2025 Barcelona TCR Europe round
JS2 R	1:51.026	Gino Rocchio	Ligier JS2 R	2026 24 Hours of Barcelona
Alpine Elf Cup	1:51.540	Charles Roussanne	Alpine A110 Cup	2024 Barcelona Alpine Elf Cup round
Supersport 300	1:54.764	Marc García	Kove 321RR	2024 Barcelona Supersport 300 round
Renault Clio Cup	2:01.137	Gabriele Torelli	Renault Clio R.S. V	2023 Barcelona Renault Clio Cup Europe round
Toyota GR Cup	2:02.544	Sandro Pérez	Toyota GR86	2025 Barcelona Toyota GR Cup Spain round
Grand Prix Circuit with Chicane (2021–present): 4.675 km (2.905 mi)
F1	1:18.149	Max Verstappen	Red Bull Racing RB16B	2021 Spanish Grand Prix
FIA F2	1:34.231	Jack Doohan	Dallara F2 2018	2022 Barcelona Formula 2 round
LMP2	1:35.797	Roman Rusinov	Aurus 01	2021 4 Hours of Barcelona
FIA F3	1:36.643	Dennis Hauger	Dallara F3 2019	2021 Barcelona Formula 3 round
Euroformula Open	1:36.779	Jak Crawford	Dallara 320	2021 Barcelona Euroformula Open round
LMP3	1:41.351	Scott Andrews	Ligier JS P320	2021 Barcelona Le Mans Cup round
Formula Regional	1:42.518	Isack Hadjar	Tatuus F3 T-318	2021 Barcelona FREC round
LM GTE	1:44.700	Gianmaria Bruni	Porsche 911 RSR-19	2021 4 Hours of Barcelona
GT3	1:45.129	Joe Osborne	McLaren 720S GT3	2022 Barcelona International GT Open round
Lamborghini Super Trofeo	1:46.679	Loris Spinelli	Lamborghini Huracán Super Trofeo Evo2	2022 Barcelona Lamborghini Super Trofeo Europe round
Formula 4	1:47.267	Nikola Tsolov	Tatuus F4-T421	2022 Barcelona F4 Spain round
Porsche Carrera Cup	1:49.608	Benjamin Paque	Porsche 911 (992 I) GT3 Cup	2023 Barcelona Porsche Sprint Challenge Southern Europe round
GT4	1:53.563	Zac Meakin	Porsche 718 Cayman GT4 Clubsport	2023 Barcelona Porsche Sprint Challenge Southern Europe round
JS P4	1:53.945	Steve Zacchia	Ligier JS P4	2021 Barcelona Ligier European Series round
TCR Touring Car	1:54.929	Mikel Azcona	CUPRA León Competicion TCR	2021 Barcelona TCR Spain round
JS2 R	1:56.186	Natan Bihel	Ligier JS2 R	2021 Barcelona Ligier European Series round
Alpine Elf Europa Cup	1:57.512	Ugo de Wilde	Alpine A110 Cup	2021 Barcelona Alpine Elf Europa Cup round
Renault Clio Cup	2:06.282	Alexandre Albouy	Renault Clio R.S. V	2021 Barcelona Renault Clio Cup Europe round
Grand Prix Circuit (2007–2020) & Motorcycle Circuit (2016–2017): 4.655 km (2.892 mi)
F1	1:18.183	Valtteri Bottas	Mercedes-AMG F1 W11 EQ Performance	2020 Spanish Grand Prix
GP2	1:29.989	Kazuki Nakajima	Dallara GP2/05	2007 Catalunya GP2 Series round
FIA F2	1:30.039	Nicholas Latifi	Dallara F2 2018	2018 Barcelona Formula 2 round
Formula Renault 3.5	1:32.313	Will Stevens	Dallara T12	2013 Barcelona Formula Renault 3.5 Series round
LMP1	1:33.515	Stéphane Sarrazin	Peugeot 908 HDi FAP	2008 1000 km of Catalunya
GP3	1:33.846	Anthoine Hubert	Dallara GP3/16	2018 Barcelona GP3 Series round
LMP2	1:34.644	Antonin Borga	Oreca 07	2019 4 Hours of Barcelona
FIA F3	1:34.711	Jehan Daruvala	Dallara F3 2019	2019 Barcelona Formula 3 round
Euroformula Open	1:36.640	Yifei Ye	Dallara 320	2020 Barcelona Euroformula Open round
F3000	1:36.824	Giacomo Ricci	Lola B02/50	2007 Barcelona Euroseries 3000 round
Formula Regional	1:41.655	Pierre-Louis Chovet	Tatuus F3 T-318	2020 Barcelona FREC round
LMP3	1:42.177	Laurents Hörr	Norma M30	2019 Barcelona Le Mans Cup round
Formula Renault 2.0	1:43.555	Christian Lundgaard	Tatuus FR2.0/13	2018 Barcelona Formula Renault Eurocup round
GT3	1:44.322	Louis Prette	Ferrari 488 GT3	2020 Barcelona International GT Open round
GT1 (GTS)	1:45.141	Antonio García	Aston Martin DBR9	2008 1000 km of Catalunya
LM GTE	1:45.529	Matteo Cairoli	Porsche 911 RSR	2019 4 Hours of Barcelona
MotoGP	1:45.969	Jonas Folger	Yamaha YZR-M1	2017 Catalan motorcycle Grand Prix
Formula Abarth	1:46.429	Patric Niederhauser	Tatuus FA010	2011 Barcelona Formula Abarth round
Formula 4	1:47.418	Thomas ten Brinke	Tatuus F4-T014	2020 Barcelona F4 Spain round
Porsche Carrera Cup	1:48.678	Ayhancan Güven	Porsche 911 (991 II) GT3 Cup	2018 Barcelona Porsche Carrera Cup France round
Moto2	1:49.712	Álex Márquez	Kalex Moto2	2017 Catalan motorcycle Grand Prix
Ferrari Challenge	1:50.384	Thomas Neubauer	Ferrari 488 Challenge Evo	2020 Barcelona Ferrari Challenge Europe round
Formula BMW	1.51.233	Esteban Gutiérrez	Mygale FB02	2008 Barcelona Formula BMW Europe round
Eurocup Mégane Trophy	1:52.332	Mirko Bortolotti	Renault Mégane Renault Sport II	2013 Barcelona Eurocup Mégane Trophy round
GT4	1:53.140	Rafael Villanueva	Mercedes-AMG GT4 HP	2020 Barcelona International GT Open round
Moto3	1:53.861	Jorge Martín	Honda NSF250RW	2017 Catalan motorcycle Grand Prix
Formula Renault 1.6	1:54.194	Victor Martins	Signatech FR 1.6	2017 Barcelona French F4 round
TCR Touring Car	1:54.971	Ashley Sutton	Volkswagen Golf GTI TCR	2018 Barcelona TCR Europe round
Alpine Elf Europa Cup	1:57.051	Julien Neveu	Alpine A110 Cup	2018 Barcelona Alpine Elf Europa Cup round
SEAT León Supercopa	1:57.220	Niels Langeveld	SEAT León Cup Racer	2016 Barcelona SEAT León Eurocup round
Renault Clio Cup	2:05.251	Nicolas Milan	Renault Clio R.S. IV	2019 Barcelona Renault Clio Cup France round
National Truck Circuit (2007–2020): 3.049 km (1.895 mi)
Renault Clio Cup	1:21.605	Jordi Palomeras	Renault Clio R.S. III Cup	2008 1st Barcelona Clio Cup Spain round
Truck racing	1:30.032	David Vršecký	Freightliner	2008 Barcelona ETRC round
National Circuit (2007–2020): 2.977 km (1.850 mi)
Formula Three	1:07.062	Andrea Caldarelli	Dallara F308	2009 Barcelona F3 Euro Series round
DTM	1:08.048	Timo Scheider	Audi A4 DTM 2009	2009 Barcelona DTM round
Porsche Carrera Cup	1:14.580	Jeroen Bleekemolen	Porsche 911 (997 I) GT3 Cup	2009 Barcelona Porsche Carrera Cup Germany round
Formula BMW	1.15.010	Philipp Eng	Mygale FB02	2007 Barcelona Formula BMW ADAC round
Motorcycle Circuit (2018–2020) & Grand Prix Circuit (2004–2006): 4.627 km (2.875 mi)
F1	1:15.641	Giancarlo Fisichella	Renault R25	2005 Spanish Grand Prix
GP2	1:25.550	Adrián Vallés	Dallara GP2/05	2006 Catalunya GP2 Series round
Formula Renault 3.5	1:29.240	Alx Danielsson	Dallara T05	2006 Barcelona Formula Renault 3.5 Series round
Formula Nissan	1:32.475	Adrián Vallés	Dallara SN01	2004 Barcelona World Series by Nissan round
F3000	1:34.233	Vitantonio Liuzzi	Lola B02/50	2004 Barcelona F3000 round
Formula Three	1:38.340	Andy Soucek	Dallara F305	2005 Barcelona Spanish F3 round
F2 (2009–2012)	1:39.283	Mirko Bortolotti	Williams JPH1B	2011 Barcelona FTwo round
MotoGP	1:40.021	Jorge Lorenzo	Ducati Desmosedici GP18	2018 Catalan motorcycle Grand Prix
Formula Renault 2.0	1:41.601	Tom Dillmann	Tatuus FR2000	2006 Barcelona Eurocup Formula Renault 2.0 round
World SBK	1:41.828	Álvaro Bautista	Honda CBR1000RR-R	2020 Barcelona World SBK round
Moto2	1:43.544	Sam Lowes	Kalex Moto2	2020 Catalan motorcycle Grand Prix
World SSP	1:45.869	Andrea Locatelli	Yamaha YZF-R6	2020 Barcelona World SSP round
Porsche Carrera Cup	1:46.187	David Saelens	Porsche 911 (997 I) GT3 Cup	2005 Barcelona Porsche Supercup round
Eurocup Mégane Trophy	1:47.921	Jaap van Lagen	Renault Mégane Renault Sport	2006 Barcelona Eurocup Mégane Trophy round
Moto3	1:48.702	Romano Fenati	Husqvarna FR250GP	2020 Catalan motorcycle Grand Prix
Supersport 300	1:55.959	Jeffrey Buis	Kawasaki Ninja 400	2020 Barcelona Supersport 300 round
National Circuit (2004–2006): 2.949 km (1.832 mi)
F3000	1:01.017	Jérôme d'Ambrosio	Lola B02/50	2006 Barcelona Euroseries 3000 round
Formula Three	1:01.876	Kohei Hirate	Dallara F305	2006 Barcelona F3 Euro Series round
DTM	1:03.919	Bernd Schneider	AMG-Mercedes C-Klasse 2006	2006 Barcelona DTM round
Porsche Carrera Cup	1:10.603	Richard Westbrook	Porsche 911 (997 I) GT3 Cup	2006 Barcelona Porsche Carrera Cup Germany round
Motorcycle Circuit (1995–2016) & Grand Prix Circuit (1995–2003): 4.730 km (2.939 mi)
F1	1:20.143	Rubens Barrichello	Ferrari F2003-GA	2003 Spanish Grand Prix
F3000	1:31.597	Emmanuel Clérico	Reynard 95D	1995 Barcelona F3000 round
Formula Nissan	1:32.629	Bas Leinders	Dallara SN01	2002 Barcelona World Series by Nissan round
LMP900	1:35.161	Franck Montagny	Dallara SP1	2002 FIA Sportscar Championship Barcelona
WSC	1:35.911	David Terrien	Ferrari 333 SP	2000 ATP Trophy
Group C	1:36.220	Rui Águas	Mercedes-Benz C11	2018 Espíritu de Montjuïc
Formula Renault 3.5	1:38.871	Neel Jani	Tatuus FRV6	2003 Barcelona Formula Renault V6 Eurocup round
MotoGP	1:42.182	Marc Márquez	Honda RC213V	2014 Catalan motorcycle Grand Prix
LMP675	1:42.386	Piergiuseppe Peroni	Lucchini SR2001	2002 FIA Sportscar Championship Barcelona
GT1 (GTS)	1:45.081	Christophe Bouchut	Chrysler Viper GTS-R	2003 FIA GT Barcelona 500km
250cc	1:45.925	Alex de Angelis	Aprilia RSV 250	2007 Catalan motorcycle Grand Prix
Moto2	1:46.474	Álex Rins	Kalex Moto2	2015 Catalan motorcycle Grand Prix
500cc	1:46.619	Valentino Rossi	Honda NSR500	2001 Catalan motorcycle Grand Prix
N-GT	1:49.504	Marc Lieb	Porsche 911 (996) GT3 RS	2003 FIA GT Barcelona 500km
125cc	1:50.590	Pol Espargaró	Derbi RSA 125	2010 Catalan motorcycle Grand Prix
Moto3	1:50.606	Efrén Vázquez	Honda NSF250RW	2015 Catalan motorcycle Grand Prix
Porsche Carrera Cup	1:53.012	Oliver Mathai	Porsche 911 (996) GT3 Cup	1999 Barcelona Porsche Supercup round
Super 2000	1:54.863	Dirk Müller	BMW 320i	2003 Barcelona ETCC round
Renault Clio Cup	2:00.676	Nicolas Milan	Renault Clio R.S. IV	2018 Barcelona Renault Clio Cup Spain round
Original National Circuit (1991–2003): 3.069 km (1.907 mi)
Formula Nissan	1:02.700	Rui Águas	Coloni CN1	2000 Barcelona Open Telefonica by Nissan round
Original Grand Prix Circuit with Nissan Chicane (1994): 4.745 km (2.948 mi)
F1	1:25.155	Michael Schumacher	Benetton B194	1994 Spanish Grand Prix
F3000	1:34.639	Jean-Christophe Boullion	Reynard 94D	1994 Barcelona F3000 round
Original Grand Prix Circuit (1991–1994): 4.747 km (2.950 mi)
F1	1:20.989	Michael Schumacher	Benetton B193	1993 Spanish Grand Prix
F3000	1:30.536	Emanuele Naspetti	Reynard 92D	1992 Barcelona F3000 round
500cc	1:48.583	Mick Doohan	Honda NSR500	1992 European motorcycle Grand Prix
250cc	1:50.362	Loris Capirossi	Honda NSR250	1994 European motorcycle Grand Prix
125cc	1:56.514	Peter Öttl	Aprilia RS125R	1994 European motorcycle Grand Prix

== Financial problems ==
The public attendance at the Spanish Grand Prix, and at the Catalan motorcycle Grand Prix, have fallen significantly since 2007, which has complicated the economic solvency of this circuit.

At least since 2009, the circuit is economically deficient, and in the period 2009–2018, €50.5m of losses were generated. The economic survival of the circuit is only guaranteed by large volumes of public money, which both the Provincial Deputation of Barcelona and the Generalitat de Catalunya provide in the form of grants and rinsing of losses.

Given these poor results, some senior officials of the Generalitat de Catalunya have considered eliminating Formula One from this Circuit. Due to the irregularities detected in the last audit, the City Council of Barcelona decided to cancel the economic grant that the circuit received until now, which has aggravated its economic survival. Recently, some more irregularities have been detected, even by the Generalitat de Catalunya.

== Noise pollution ==
The circuit is located in an elevated area with respect to its environment, and without protective measures to minimize the noise pollution produced by cars, motorbikes and other vehicles. Therefore, it is a real source of acoustic disturbance, and the noise produced during many days of racing and testing during the year is noticeable for many kilometers around the circuit, especially in the adjacent municipalities, which is recognized by the Generalitat itself, the main owner of the Circuit.

== Fatalities ==
- Luis Salom – 2016 Catalan motorcycle Grand Prix
