= Spanish Grand Prix =

Motorsport event

- Madring

Race information
- Number of times held: 67
- First held: 1913
- Most wins (drivers): (Germany) Michael Schumacher (6) (United Kingdom) Lewis Hamilton (6)
- Most wins (constructors): (Italy) Ferrari (12)
- Circuit length: 5.414 km (3.364 miles)
- Race length: 308.399 km (191.630 miles)
- Laps: 57

Last race (2026)

Pole position
- (United Kingdom) Lando Norris; McLaren-Mercedes; 1:31.824

Podium
- 1. (Italy) K. Antonelli; Mercedes; 1:34:23.754; 2. (Netherlands) M. Verstappen; Red Bull Racing-Red Bull Ford; +4.351; 3. (United Kingdom) L. Norris; McLaren-Mercedes; +5.089

Fastest lap
- (United Kingdom) George Russell; Mercedes; 1:35.587

The Spanish Grand Prix (Spanish: Gran Premio de España, Catalan: Gran Premi d'Espanya) is a motorsports event held as part of the Formula One World Championship. First held in 1913, the race is one of the oldest in the world that is still being contested, celebrating its centenary in 2013. The race had modest beginnings as a production car race. Interrupted by the First World War, the race waited a decade for its second running before becoming a staple of the European calendar. In 1927 it was part of the World Manufacturers' Championship; it was promoted to the European Championship in 1935 before the Spanish Civil War brought an end to racing. The race was successfully revived in 1967 and has been a regular part of the Formula One World Championship since 1968 (except 1982–1985).

Since its inception, the Spanish Grand Prix has been held in several venues and is usually held in May or June. In 2026 the Spanish Grand Prix moved to September and for the first time was hosted at the Madring, a newly built street circuit in Madrid. The previous circuit, Circuit de Barcelona-Catalunya is contracted to host Grands Prix in even numbered years from 2026 to 2032, under the title Barcelona-Catalunya Grand Prix while the Madring is contracted to host the Spanish Grand Prix until 2035.

== History ==
=== Origins and pre-war ===
The first race generally considered to be a Spanish Grand Prix was held in 1913. Though not run to the Grand Prix formula of the day, instead it was a race for touring cars, taking place on a 300-kilometre road circuit at Guadarrama, near Madrid, on the road to Valladolid. It was officially named the RACE Grand Prix (after the Royal Automobile Club of Spain) and was won by Carlos de Salamanca with Rolls-Royce.

Motor racing events had taken place in Spain prior to that—the most notable among them being the Catalan Cup held annually from 1908 to 1910, on roads around Sitges, near Barcelona. The first event was won by Giosuè Giuppone on a Lion-Peugeot, with both following events won by Jules Goux, also driving a Lion-Peugeot, these races helping to establish a strong racing tradition in Spain, which has continued to this day. This enthusiasm for racing led to the plan to build a permanent track at Sitges—a 2-kilometre (1.2 mi) oval that became known as Sitges-Terramar, and was the site of the first race to officially carry the title Spanish Grand Prix in 1923, won by Albert Divo in a Sunbeam.

==== Lasarte ====
After this first race, the track fell into financial difficulties, and the organisers had to look for another venue. In 1926, the Spanish Grand Prix moved to the 17.749 km (11.029 mi) Circuito Lasarte on the northern coast near Bilbao, home of the main race in Spain during the 1920s—the San Sebastián Grand Prix. The 1927 Spanish Grand Prix was part of the AIACR World Manufacturers' Championship, but the race was still not established and in 1928 and 1929 was run to sports car regulations. The 1930 Spanish Grand Prix for sports cars, scheduled for 27 July, was cancelled due to the bad economic situation following the Wall Street crash in October 1929. The 1931 and 1932 Spanish Grands Prix were also announced, only to be cancelled due to political and economic difficulties. Finally, in 1933 the Spanish Grand Prix was revived at Lasarte with government backing. Following the 1935 race, Spain descended into civil war and racing stopped. In 1946, racing returned to Spain in the form of the Penya Rhin Grand Prix at the Pedralbes street circuit in Barcelona.

=== Formula One ===
==== Pedralbes ====
Spain did not return to the international calendar until 1951, joining the list of races of the Formula One championship at the very wide Pedralbes street circuit in Barcelona. Argentine Juan Manuel Fangio won his first world championship at the 1951 event in an Alfa Romeo while he took advantage of the improved works Ferrari's tire problems. The race was scheduled for the 1952 and 1953 seasons but did not take place due to a lack of money, and in 1954, Briton Mike Hawthorn stopped Mercedes's dominance by winning in a Ferrari. In 1955, the Spanish Grand Prix at Pedralbes was scheduled to take place, but a terrible accident at the 24 Hours of Le Mans that killed more than 80 people resulted in regulations governing spectator safety, and the scheduled Spanish Grand Prix (like many others) was cancelled that year and for the subsequent 2 years (also owing to more problems with money to hold the race), and the wide but pedestrian-lined street track at Pedralbes was then never used again for motor racing.

==== Jarama and Montjuïc ====
In the 1960s, Spain made a bid to return to the world of international motor racing—the Royal Automobile Club of Spain commissioned a new permanent racing circuit just north of Madrid at Jarama, and the Spanish government refurbished the Montjuïc Circuit in Barcelona with safety upgrades. A non-championship Grand Prix took place at Jarama in 1967, which was won by Jim Clark racing in a Lotus F1 car.

In 1968, Jarama hosted the Spanish Grand Prix, near the beginning of the F1 season. It was agreed, following this event, that the race would alternate between the tight, slow and twisty Jarama and the fast, wide and sweeping Montjuïc, and the Montjuïc circuit hosted its first Formula One race in 1969, with Briton Jackie Stewart winning. Jarama would get the race in even-numbered years, and Montjuïc in odd-numbered years. 1970 was a race that saw Belgian Jacky Ickx and Briton Jackie Oliver get involved in a fiery accident; with Ickx and Oliver escaping with burns. The race was won by Stewart, he won again the next year after holding off 3 more powerful 12-cylinder engined cars. Austrian Niki Lauda won his first of 25 races in 1974. The 1975 event was marked by tragedy. There had been concerns about track safety during practice races, as the Armco barriers surrounding the city streets of the Montjuïc Circuit had not been fastened down properly. There were a number of protests, and the drivers refused to race. The organizers panicked, and they threatened to lock the cars inside the stadium where they stayed while not being raced. The drivers and teams relented; but double-winner Emerson Fittipaldi retired in protest after a single lap. On the 26th lap of the race, Rolf Stommelen's car crashed when the rear wing broke off, killing four spectators. The race was stopped on the 29th lap and won by Jochen Mass, though only half the points were awarded.

==== Jarama ====
After the tragic events at the dangerously fast and tight space of Montjuïc, the Spanish Grand Prix was confined to Jarama. The 1976 race saw Briton James Hunt take advantage of Lauda's broken ribs in a tractor accident; he was then disqualified after his McLaren was found to be 1.8 inches too wide. McLaren appealed the decision, and it was successful; Hunt's points were restored. 1977 and 1978 saw Mario Andretti dominate in his ground-effect Lotus 78. The 1980 race was of note, because on the Friday morning of race weekend, FISA president Jean-Marie Balestre announced the Spanish Grand Prix would not be counted as a championship race. As a result, none of the factory teams (Ferrari, Renault and Alfa Romeo) showed up for the event and only the independent constructors belonging to FOCA competed. The race was won by Alan Jones in a Williams. 1981 was a race that Gilles Villeneuve in his ill-handling Ferrari held off 4 better-handling cars to take victory on the twisty and confined circuit; this is considered one of the greatest drives in all motorsports. The Spanish Grand Prix at Jarama was then also dropped from the racing calendar after being cancelled in 1982 because the organizers seemed more interested in the golf course near the circuit, and because of the narrow track, unpleasantly hot late June conditions, and small crowd at that year's race; it would return in 1986.

==== Jerez ====
An attempt to revive the Spanish Grand Prix on a street circuit in the southwestern resort town of Fuengirola for 1984 and 1985 did not work out; but in 1985, the Mayor of Jerez commissioned a new racing circuit in his town to promote tourism and sherries. The track, the Circuito Permanente de Jerez, located near Seville in southern Spain was finished in time for the 1986 championship, which saw a furious battle between Ayrton Senna and Nigel Mansell, with the two cars finishing side by side. Senna won by 0.014 seconds—one of F1's closest finishes. 1987 saw Mansell win in his Williams; and 1989 saw Senna drive a hard race to keep himself in the championship points; he won the event from Austrian Gerhard Berger in a Ferrari and the Brazilian's fierce rival and McLaren teammate, Frenchman Alain Prost. The 1990 event was the last Spanish Grand Prix at Jerez (although Jerez did stage the European Grand Prix in 1994 and 1997). During the practice, Martin Donnelly's Lotus was destroyed in a high-speed crash, and the Briton was ejected from the car. He was severely injured, but survived; he never raced in Formula One again. Jerez's remote location did not help build large crowds for the race, combined with Donnelly's appalling crash into Armco barriers close to the track did nothing to help Jerez's reputation; although the circuit was popular with the F1 fraternity. Ferrari finished first and second in the race, with Prost finishing ahead of Mansell.

==== Catalunya ====
Work on the Circuit de Barcelona-Catalunya was underway in Montmeló, few kilometres from Barcelona, thanks to the support of the Spanish government, and in 1991, the event moved to this new track. The 1992 event was advertised as the Grand Prix of the Olympic Games. Since that race the race has been held in early season, usually in late April or early May.

The Williams team dominated the first outings there, taking all victories until 1994. Michael Schumacher has won a total of six times, including his 1996 victory in heavy rain, which was his first for Ferrari. Mika Häkkinen took three victories and was on road for fourth in 2001 before his car failed on the last lap.

Since 2003 the race has been well attended thanks to success of Fernando Alonso. Alonso finished second in 2003 and 2005 before taking victory from pole in 2006. Alonso also finished third in 2007, with two further second places in 2010 and 2012, where he finished behind the Williams of Spanish speaking Pastor Maldonado, who won from pole; this was the first win and pole in a Grand Prix for a Venezuelan driver and Williams's first win since the 2004 Brazilian Grand Prix and the team's first Spanish Grand Prix win and pole since 1997. Two Spanish drivers have won the Spanish Grand Prix; Carlos de Salamanca in 1913 and Alonso in 2006 and 2013, with Spanish speaking Juan Manuel Fangio winning in 1951 as well as Maldonado in 2012.

From 2013, the Spanish Grand Prix was due to alternate every year between Catalunya and the Valencia Street Circuit. However, this did not happen—Valencia dropped out for financial reasons and Catalunya remained the sole host of the Spanish Grand Prix.

Only four of the 19 races at this track between 2001 and 2019 have not been won from pole position.

The 2020 race was postponed from May to August due to the COVID-19 pandemic. The race returned in 2021; Lewis Hamilton won the race after passing Max Verstappen after making an additional pit stop.

The layout of the Circuit de Barcelona-Catalunya changed in 2023 to use the layout currently used by MotoGP since 2021.

==== Madrid ====
Spain's capital city Madrid began hosting the Spanish Grand Prix in 2026, under a contract that runs until 2035. The new circuit, called the Madring, was a street circuit around the IFEMA Exhibition Centre. The first edition on the new track was won by Kimi Antonelli, driving for Mercedes.

== Winners ==
=== By year ===
Catalunya, used 1991–2025

Jerez, used 1986–1990

Jarama, used 1967–1968, 1970, 1972, 1974, 1976–1981

Montjuïc, alternating with Jarama 1969, 1971, 1973, 1975

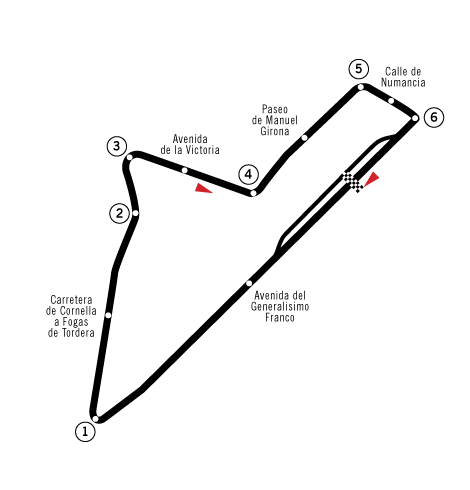
Pedralbes, used in 1951 and 1954

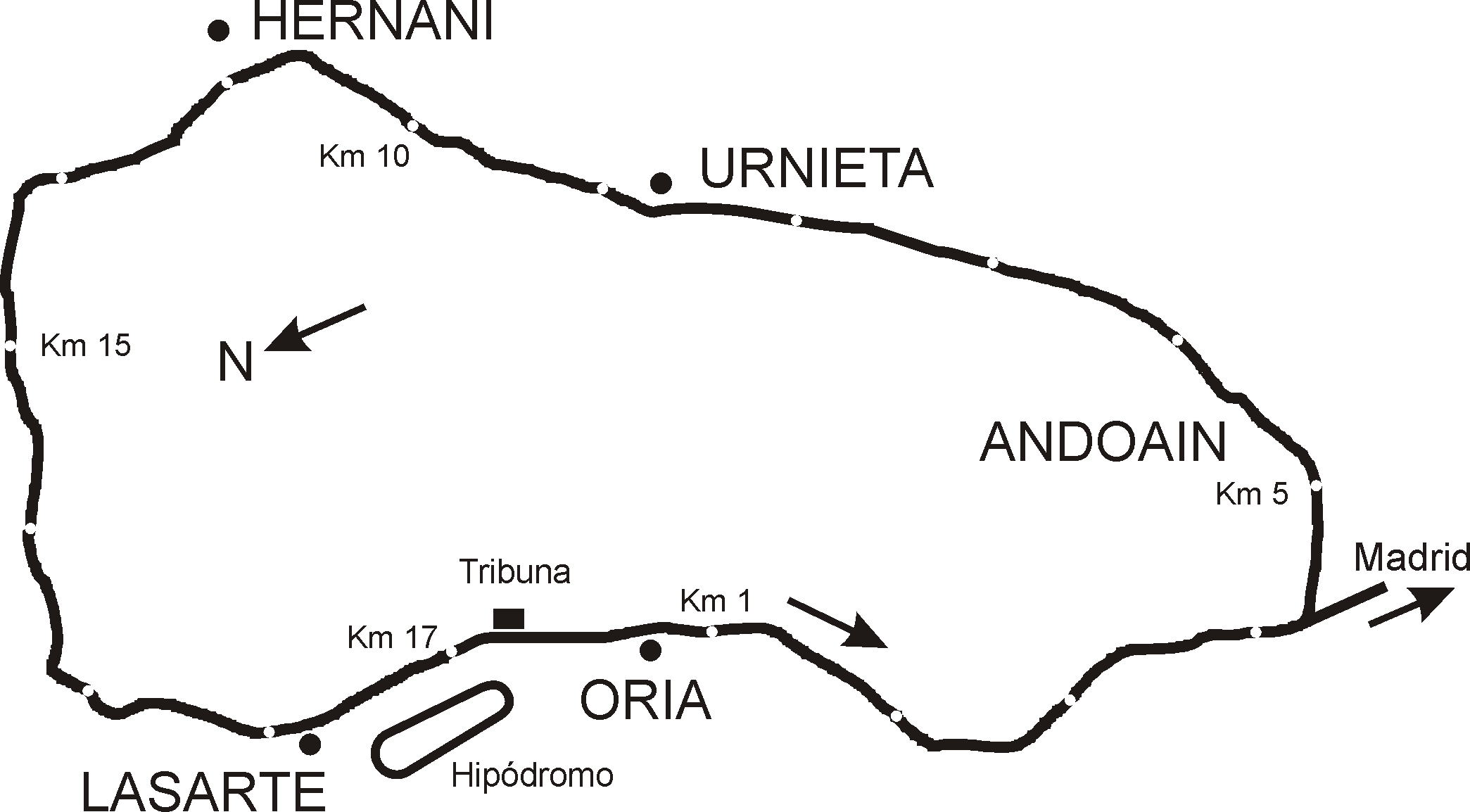
Lasarte, used in 1926–1930, 1933–1935

Sitges-Terramar, used in 1923

Guadarrama, used in 1913

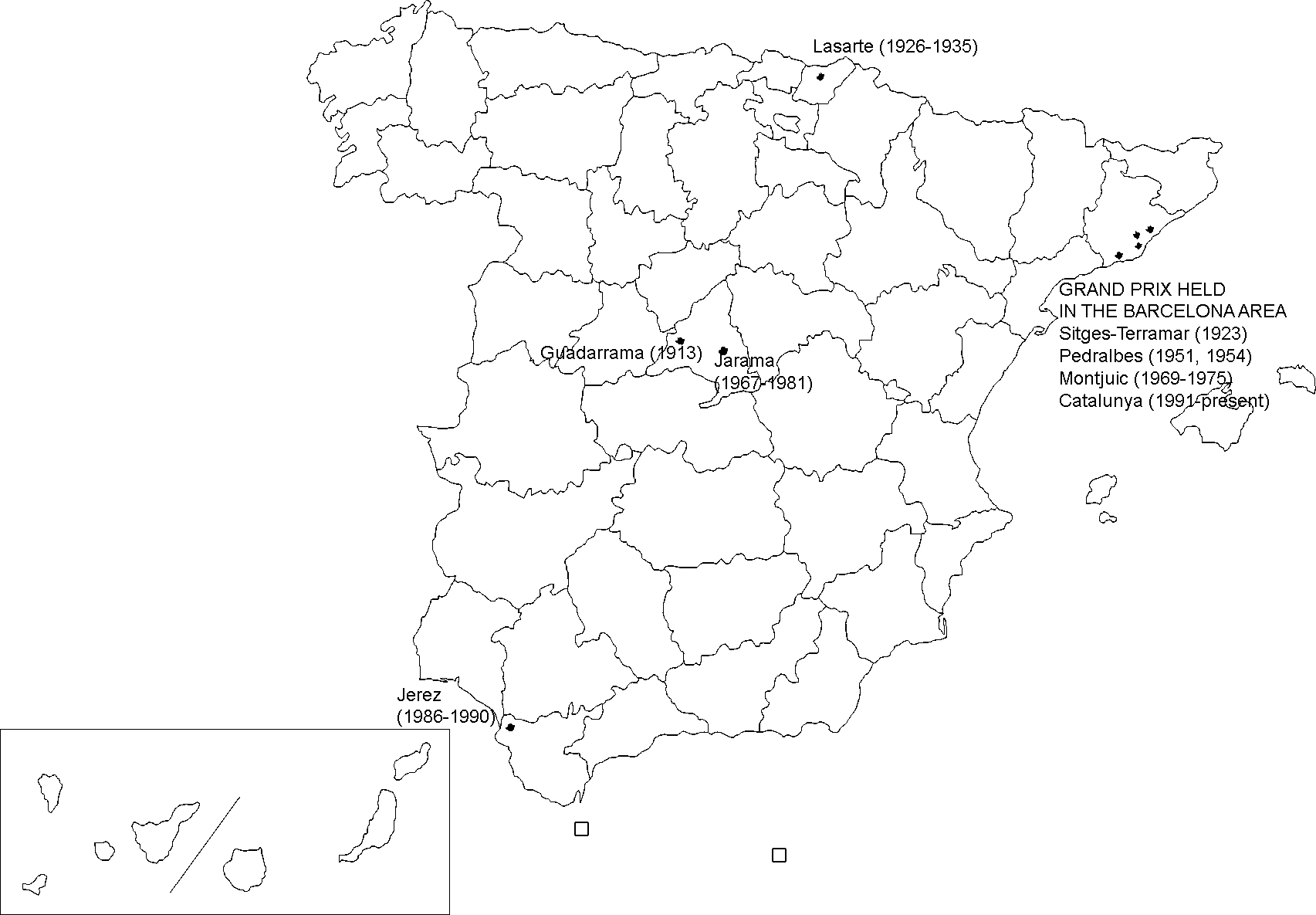
A map of all the venues that hosted the Spanish Grand Prix

A pink background indicates an event that was not part of the Formula One World Championship.
A yellow background indicates an event that was part of the pre-war European Championship.
A green background indicates an event that was part of the pre-war World Manufacturers' Championship.

Year	Driver	Constructor	Location	Report
1913†	(Spain) Carlos de Salamanca	Rolls-Royce	Guadarrama	Report *
1914 – 1922	Not held			
1923	(France) Albert Divo	Sunbeam	Sitges-Terramar	Report
1924 – 1925	Not held			
1926	(Italy) Bartolomeo Costantini	Bugatti	Lasarte	Report
1927	(France) Robert Benoist	Delage	Lasarte	Report
1928	(Monaco) Louis Chiron	Bugatti	Lasarte	Report *
1929	(France) Louis Rigal	Alfa Romeo	Lasarte	Report *
1930	(Italy) Achille Varzi	Maserati	Lasarte	Report
1931 – 1932	Not held			
1933	(Monaco) Louis Chiron	Alfa Romeo	Lasarte	Report
1934	(Italy) Luigi Fagioli	Mercedes-Benz	Lasarte	Report
1935	(Germany) Rudolf Caracciola	Mercedes-Benz	Lasarte	Report
1936 – 1950	Not held			
1951	(Argentina) Juan Manuel Fangio	Alfa Romeo	Pedralbes	Report
1952 – 1953	Not held			
1954	(United Kingdom) Mike Hawthorn	Ferrari	Pedralbes	Report
1955 – 1966	Not held			
1967	(United Kingdom) Jim Clark	Lotus-Cosworth	Jarama	Report
1968	(United Kingdom) Graham Hill	Lotus-Ford	Jarama	Report
1969	(United Kingdom) Jackie Stewart	Matra-Ford	Montjuïc	Report
1970	(United Kingdom) Jackie Stewart	March-Ford	Jarama	Report
1971	(United Kingdom) Jackie Stewart	Tyrrell-Ford	Montjuïc	Report
1972	(Brazil) Emerson Fittipaldi	Lotus-Ford	Jarama	Report
1973	(Brazil) Emerson Fittipaldi	Lotus-Ford	Montjuïc	Report
1974	(Austria) Niki Lauda	Ferrari	Jarama	Report
1975	(West Germany) Jochen Mass	McLaren-Ford	Montjuïc	Report
1976	(United Kingdom) James Hunt	McLaren-Ford	Jarama	Report
1977	(United States) Mario Andretti	Lotus-Ford	Jarama	Report
1978	(United States) Mario Andretti	Lotus-Ford	Jarama	Report
1979	(France) Patrick Depailler	Ligier-Ford	Jarama	Report
1980	(Australia) Alan Jones	Williams-Ford	Jarama	Report
1981	(Canada) Gilles Villeneuve	Ferrari	Jarama	Report
1982 – 1985	Not held			
1986	(Brazil) Ayrton Senna	Lotus-Renault	Jerez	Report
1987	(United Kingdom) Nigel Mansell	Williams-Honda	Jerez	Report
1988	(France) Alain Prost	McLaren-Honda	Jerez	Report
1989	(Brazil) Ayrton Senna	McLaren-Honda	Jerez	Report
1990	(France) Alain Prost	Ferrari	Jerez	Report
1991	(United Kingdom) Nigel Mansell	Williams-Renault	Catalunya	Report
1992	(United Kingdom) Nigel Mansell	Williams-Renault	Catalunya	Report
1993	(France) Alain Prost	Williams-Renault	Catalunya	Report
1994	(United Kingdom) Damon Hill	Williams-Renault	Catalunya	Report
1995	(Germany) Michael Schumacher	Benetton-Renault	Catalunya	Report
1996	(Germany) Michael Schumacher	Ferrari	Catalunya	Report
1997	(Canada) Jacques Villeneuve	Williams-Renault	Catalunya	Report
1998	(Finland) Mika Häkkinen	McLaren-Mercedes	Catalunya	Report
1999	(Finland) Mika Häkkinen	McLaren-Mercedes	Catalunya	Report
2000	(Finland) Mika Häkkinen	McLaren-Mercedes	Catalunya	Report
2001	(Germany) Michael Schumacher	Ferrari	Catalunya	Report
2002	(Germany) Michael Schumacher	Ferrari	Catalunya	Report
2003	(Germany) Michael Schumacher	Ferrari	Catalunya	Report
2004	(Germany) Michael Schumacher	Ferrari	Catalunya	Report
2005	(Finland) Kimi Räikkönen	McLaren-Mercedes	Catalunya	Report
2006	(Spain) Fernando Alonso	Renault	Catalunya	Report
2007	(Brazil) Felipe Massa	Ferrari	Catalunya	Report
2008	(Finland) Kimi Räikkönen	Ferrari	Catalunya	Report
2009	(United Kingdom) Jenson Button	Brawn-Mercedes	Catalunya	Report
2010	(Australia) Mark Webber	Red Bull-Renault	Catalunya	Report
2011	(Germany) Sebastian Vettel	Red Bull-Renault	Catalunya	Report
2012	(Venezuela) Pastor Maldonado	Williams-Renault	Catalunya	Report
2013	(Spain) Fernando Alonso	Ferrari	Catalunya	Report
2014	(United Kingdom) Lewis Hamilton	Mercedes	Catalunya	Report
2015	(Germany) Nico Rosberg	Mercedes	Catalunya	Report
2016	(Netherlands) Max Verstappen	Red Bull Racing-TAG Heuer	Catalunya	Report
2017	(United Kingdom) Lewis Hamilton	Mercedes	Catalunya	Report
2018	(United Kingdom) Lewis Hamilton	Mercedes	Catalunya	Report
2019	(United Kingdom) Lewis Hamilton	Mercedes	Catalunya	Report
2020	(United Kingdom) Lewis Hamilton	Mercedes	Catalunya	Report
2021	(United Kingdom) Lewis Hamilton	Mercedes	Catalunya	Report
2022	(Netherlands) Max Verstappen	Red Bull Racing-RBPT	Catalunya	Report
2023	(Netherlands) Max Verstappen	Red Bull Racing-Honda RBPT	Catalunya	Report
2024	(Netherlands) Max Verstappen	Red Bull Racing-Honda RBPT	Catalunya	Report
2025	(Australia) Oscar Piastri	McLaren-Mercedes	Catalunya	Report
2026	(Italy) Kimi Antonelli	Mercedes	Madrid	Report

* Sports car race
† Officially named as RACE Grand Prix

=== Multiple winners (drivers) ===
Drivers in bold are competing in the Formula One championship in 2026
A pink background indicates an event that was not part of the Formula One World Championship.

Wins	Driver	Years won
6	(Germany) Michael Schumacher	1995, 1996, 2001, 2002, 2003, 2004
6	(United Kingdom) **Lewis Hamilton**	2014, 2017, 2018, 2019, 2020, 2021
4	(Netherlands) **Max Verstappen**	2016, 2022, 2023, 2024
3	(United Kingdom) Jackie Stewart	1969, 1970, 1971
3	(United Kingdom) Nigel Mansell	1987, 1991, 1992
3	(France) Alain Prost	1988, 1990, 1993
3	(Finland) Mika Häkkinen	1998, 1999, 2000
2	(Monaco) Louis Chiron	1928, 1933
2	(Brazil) Emerson Fittipaldi	1972, 1973
2	(United States) Mario Andretti	1977, 1978
2	(Brazil) Ayrton Senna	1986, 1989
2	(Finland) Kimi Räikkönen	2005, 2008
2	(Spain) **Fernando Alonso**	2006, 2013

=== Multiple winners (constructors) ===
Teams in bold are competing in the Formula One championship in 2026.
A pink background indicates an event that was not part of the Formula One World Championship.
A yellow background indicates an event that was part of the pre-war European Championship.

Wins	Constructor	Years won
12	(Italy) **Ferrari**	1954, 1974, 1981, 1990, 1996, 2001, 2002, 2003, 2004, 2007, 2008, 2013
10	(Germany) **Mercedes**	1934, 1935, 2014, 2015, 2017, 2018, 2019, 2020, 2021, 2026
9	(United Kingdom) **McLaren**	1975, 1976, 1988, 1989, 1998, 1999, 2000, 2005, 2025
8	(United Kingdom) **Williams**	1980, 1987, 1991, 1992, 1993, 1994, 1997, 2012
7	(United Kingdom) Lotus	1967, 1968, 1972, 1973, 1977, 1978, 1986
6	(Austria) **Red Bull**	2010, 2011, 2016, 2022, 2023, 2024
3	(Italy) Alfa Romeo	1929, 1933, 1951
2	(France) Bugatti	1926, 1928

=== Multiple winners (engine manufacturers) ===
Manufacturers in bold are competing in the Formula One championship in 2026.
A pink background indicates an event that was not part of the Formula One World Championship.
A yellow background indicates an event that was part of the pre-war European Championship.

Wins	Manufacturer	Years won
16	(Germany) **Mercedes** **	1934, 1935, 1998, 1999, 2000, 2005, 2009, 2014, 2015, 2017, 2018, 2019, 2020, 2021, 2025, 2026
13	(United States) Ford *	1967, 1968, 1969, 1970, 1971, 1972, 1973, 1975, 1976, 1977, 1978, 1979, 1980
12	(Italy) **Ferrari**	1954, 1974, 1981, 1990, 1996, 2001, 2002, 2003, 2004, 2007, 2008, 2013
11	(France) Renault	1986, 1991, 1992, 1993, 1994, 1995, 1997, 2006, 2010, 2011, 2012
3	(Italy) Alfa Romeo	1929, 1933, 1951
3	**(Japan) Honda**	1987, 1988, 1989
2	(France) Bugatti	1926, 1928
2	(Japan) Honda RBPT	2023, 2024

* Designed and built by Cosworth, funded by Ford

** Between 1998 and 2005 designed and built by Ilmor, funded by Mercedes

== See also ==
- San Sebastián Grand Prix
- Barcelona-Catalunya Grand Prix
