= Madring =

Street racing circuit in Madrid, Spain

- Grand Prix Circuit (2026)
- Location: Barajas, Madrid, Spain
- Coordinates: 40°27′55″N 3°36′55″W
- Capacity: 110,000
- FIA Grade: 1
- Opened: 11 September 2026; 55 days ago
- Construction cost: €83.2 million
- Architect: Jarno Zaffelli
- Major events: Current: Formula One; Spanish Grand Prix (2026); Formula 2 (2026); Formula 3 (2026)
- Website: madring.com

Grand Prix Circuit (2026)
- Length: 5.414 km (3.364 mi)
- Turns: 22
- Race lap record: 1:35.587 ( (United Kingdom) George Russell, Mercedes-AMG F1 W17, 2026, Formula One)

The Madring (Spanish pronunciation: [maˈðɾiŋ]), officially Circuito de Madring, is a hybrid circuit around the IFEMA Exhibition Centre in Madrid, Spain. It hosts the Formula One Spanish Grand Prix, starting in 2026, displacing the Circuit de Barcelona-Catalunya, which had hosted the race since 1991. The Madring has a spectator capacity of 110,000.

The circuit has a layout of 5.414 km (3.364 mi) and is used to host Formula One, Formula 2 and Formula 3 events. With its construction, it replaces the outdated Circuito del Jarama, located 18 kilometres (11 mi) to the north, where the last Formula One Grand Prix in Madrid was held in 1981. It becomes the seventh Spanish circuit to host a race in the highest category of world motorsport after Jarama, Circuito de Jerez, Valencia Street Circuit, and the three venues in or near Barcelona, Pedralbes Circuit, Montjuïc Circuit, and Circuit de Barcelona-Catalunya at Montmeló.

== Background ==
The Spanish Grand Prix first ran in 1913 and has run mostly uninterrupted since 1967, becoming part of the Formula One World Championship the following year. Since 1967, the race has been held at several venues: Jarama, Montjuïc, Jerez, and Barcelona-Catalunya. Jarama—the only one of these venues in Madrid—last hosted a race in 1981; the final race, which was described as an "all-time classic" by Motor Sport, was marred by threats from Basque separatist group ETA, as well as high ticket prices, contributing to a relatively low attendance of 25,000.

Barcelona-Catalunya has hosted the event since 1991, being considered popular with drivers and a traditional venue for pre-season testing. The Bahrain International Circuit became the sole pre-season testing venue in 2023, with Barcelona-Catalunya's contract to host the Spanish Grand Prix expiring in 2026. Journalists had historically criticised its spectator experience, facilities, accessibility to public transport, and lack of overtaking opportunities presented to modern Formula One cars. In response to these criticisms, the Generalitat de Catalunya announced a €50-million plan to renovate the circuit, mentioning the possibility of building a new train station nearby.

== History ==
The idea of a street circuit for Madrid, independent of the Jarama circuit, dates back to 2014, when it was presented to Bernie Ecclestone. Since then, and amid the difficulties of hosting two Formula One Grand Prix races in Spain in the same season, the project matured and took shape.

=== Local government involvement ===
Isabel Díaz Ayuso, the president of the Community of Madrid since 2019, prioritised returning the event to Madrid, calling the project "a dream" and promising to "do everything [she could]" to facilitate it. IFEMA, a government-affiliated firm, agreed to organise the bid and operate the event. In 2022, circuit designer Jarno Zaffelli—who previously worked on Zandvoort, Spa-Francorchamps, Silverstone, Marina Bay, and Mugello—was commissioned to refurbish Jarama. In February 2023, IFEMA invited him to design a new circuit from scratch at the IFEMA Exhibition Centre.

The dispute grew politicised. Díaz Ayuso, a political conservative, publicly criticised her political rival, socialist Spanish premier Pedro Sánchez, for not subsidising the project. Madrid's opposition leader Juan Lobato questioned why money was being spent on Formula One before hospitals or road infrastructure, although Díaz Ayuso responded that Madrid had already been investing in hospitals and roads. The PSOE also accused Díaz Ayuso of pushing the project forward to burnish her personal image, suggesting that she was "thinking about her photo in a Ferrari F1 car". Other social democrats in Madrid tepidly supported the project in principle but expressed concerns about its cost.

The different political factions also offered contrasting perspectives on the economics of the event. Madrid's mayor José Luis Martínez-Almeida (another member of Díaz Ayuso's political party) asserted that the project will not rely on public funding, although Díaz Ayuso implied that she would have liked for IFEMA to receive public subsidies from the central government, remarking that "we also have the right to receive investment". Race organisers commissioned a study from Deloitte projecting that the track would attract over 85,000 tourists a year and generate €450m in annual revenue. On the other hand, progressive outlet ElDiario.es reported that IFEMA (which is majority-owned by government entities) would spend €47.5m on the project and does not expect to recover its investment for 13 years. Writing for Catalan government-owned television network TV3, journalist Iván Gutiérrez asserted that no IBEX 35 company was willing to help underwrite the project and opined that the Madrid circuit was unlikely to turn a profit absent government subsidies.

At the end of 2022, the City Council and the Community of Madrid entered into preliminary contact with the Formula One organizers. The proposal was presented to Stefano Domenicali, chief executive officer of Formula One in early 2023. The Fédération Internationale de l'Automobile (FIA) gave initial approval to the Madrid Circuit in June 2023.

=== Formula One ===
In January 2024, Formula One announced that it would move the Spanish Grand Prix to Madrid's IFEMA Exhibition Centre from 2026 to 2035. The FIA's Formula 2 and Formula 3 competitions will also move to Madrid as support races. Contractors Acciona and Eiffage agreed to construct the circuit for €83.2 million, and Match Hospitality (the hospitality manager for the British Grand Prix) agreed to invest €400 million over ten years to build VIP areas for the race. The circuit is expected to be ready by May 2026.

The Madrid project reportedly offered to pay Formula One €48m/year, nearly twice as much as Barcelona's current payment of €26m, in exchange for the right to host the race. In addition, Autosport noted that Formula One Group owner Liberty Media was attracted to the IFEMA site's easy access to public transportation and a major airport; the Barcelona circuit is 26 miles from the city airport and has a reputation for heavy traffic. Formula One envisioned that the circuit's access to downtown Madrid would permit celebrations and fan activities in the city centre.

The move put Barcelona's race status in jeopardy. Although Formula One chief Stefano Domenicali left open the possibility of keeping Montmeló on the calendar beyond 2026 (under a different Grand Prix name), he later admitted that it was unlikely; he has also said that he has no plans to add more races to the Formula One calendar. Díaz Ayuso claimed that while "it was not an easy task" to bring Formula One to Madrid, the status of the Barcelona race "has nothing to do with Madrid". Catalonia's then-president Pere Aragonès responded that he was still negotiating with Formula One about keeping Montmeló's race slot beyond 2026 and that he would not allow "outsiders" to dictate when future developments would be announced.

=== Name ===
In March 2025, the race organisers announced that the IFEMA circuit would be named the Madring, a portmanteau of "Madrid" and "ring", evoking the names of several other European race tracks such as the Nürburgring and Hungaroring. Race organizers also outlined their ambition for the track to become a "spectacle circuit" like other city tracks on the calendar, such as the Miami International Autodrome and the Las Vegas Strip Circuit.

== Layout ==
The circuit, designed by the specialist company Studio Dromo, responsible for the design of Yas Marina Circuit and the renovations of Circuit Zandvoort and Circuit de Spa-Francorchamps, has a total length of 5.414 km (3.364 mi). It is made up of 22 corners with fast sections such as the "Valdebebas linked corners" and technical sections, such as the "Bunker".

=== Site ===
The Madring is located on the campus of the IFEMA exhibition centre, near Madrid-Barajas Airport and the Ciudad Real Madrid training complex. The site is accessible via Line 8 of the Madrid Metro, and is an eight-minute metro ride from the airport.

Formula One announced that the circuit will initially seat 110,000 fans, with plans to expand to 140,000 within five years. According to Formula One, this would make the Madring "one of the largest venues on the F1 calendar". (The Circuit de Barcelona-Catalunya has a capacity of 140,700.)

=== Layout ===
The Madring is a street circuit using both public roads and non-public land, similar to the Miami International Autodrome. It is part of a large rise in street circuits in Formula One. Street circuits with temporary facilities tend to be cheaper than purpose-built circuits; do not leave behind white elephants after the race contract ends; and offer an opportunity to race in relatively glamorous settings. However, they may have larger annual operating costs, and unlike traditional purpose-built circuits, cannot be used year-round so there is no scope for additional event income. Events at the Madring take place in an area that is "practically industrial".

At the time of announcement, the track was planned to be 5.414 km (3.364 mi) long, with a projected average lap time of 1:34:4 and 22 corners (originally announced as 20), including a "mixture of slow, medium and fast corners" with "long straights and big stops to promote overtaking", including the following features:

- La Monumental, which is the "longest banked curve" in Formula One. Zaffelli noted that the turn would not be as long as Indianapolis Motor Speedway, where the high speeds and banking of the final turn caused a number of tyre failures that (coupled with other factors) led to fourteen cars sitting out the 2005 United States Grand Prix. The turn itself was restricted to having no more than 13.5 degrees of banking.
- Two tunnel sections running underneath an elevated motorway.
- A "sharp downhill" drop between Turns 7 and 9.
- Two straight mode zones, along the main straight (between Turns 22 and 1) and between Turns 3 and 4
- The first covered paddock in Formula One.
- Two extra corners designated 5A and 20A, not commonly used in modern Formula 1.

Following the circuit's maiden F1 race, it faced criticism from drivers for the lack of overtaking opportunities.

== Events ==
Current

- September: Formula One Spanish Grand Prix, FIA Formula 2 Championship, FIA Formula 3 Championship

Future

- Porsche Supercup (2027)

== Lap records ==
As of September 2026, the fastest official race lap records at the Madring are listed as:

Category	Time	Driver	Vehicle	Event
Grand Prix Circuit (2026): 5.414 km (3.364 mi)
Formula One	1:35.587	George Russell	Mercedes-AMG F1 W17	2026 Spanish Grand Prix
FIA F2	1:46.257	Alex Dunne	Dallara F2 2024	2026 Madrid Formula 2 round
FIA F3	1:51.214	Théophile Naël	Dallara F3 2025	2026 Madrid Formula 3 round
