= 2025 Spanish Grand Prix =

Formula One motor race

Race 9 of 24 in the 2025 Formula One World Championship
← Previous race	Next race →
- Layout of the Circuit de Barcelona-Catalunya, Spain

Race details
- Date: 1 June 2025
- Official name: Formula 1 Aramco Gran Premio de España 2025
- Location: Circuit de Barcelona-Catalunya, Montmeló, Spain
- Course: Permanent racing facility
- Course length: 4.657 km (2.894 miles)
- Distance: 66 laps, 307.236 km (190.908 miles)
- Weather: Sunny
- Attendance: 300,286

Pole position
Driver	(Australia) Oscar Piastri	McLaren-Mercedes
- Time: 1:11.546

Fastest lap
Driver	(Australia) Oscar Piastri	McLaren-Mercedes
- Time: 1:15.743 on lap 61 (lap record)

Podium
First	(Australia) Oscar Piastri	McLaren-Mercedes
Second	(United Kingdom) Lando Norris	McLaren-Mercedes
Third	(Monaco) Charles Leclerc	Ferrari

The 2025 Spanish Grand Prix (officially known as the Formula 1 Aramco Gran Premio de España 2025) was a Formula One motor race that was held on 1 June 2025, at the Circuit de Barcelona-Catalunya in Montmeló, Spain. It was the ninth round of the 2025 Formula One World Championship. Oscar Piastri of McLaren secured pole position and won the event ahead of his teammate Lando Norris and Charles Leclerc of Ferrari.

The result extended Piastri's gap over Norris to ten points in the championship. Following his ten-second time-penalty for causing a collision with George Russell, Max Verstappen was now 49 points behind Piastri in third. Ferrari passed both Mercedes and Red Bull for second in the championship with 162 points, six and 21 points clear from both teams, respectively.

== Background ==
The event was held at the Circuit de Barcelona-Catalunya in Montmeló for the 35th time in the circuit's history, across the weekend of 30 May – 1 June. The Grand Prix was the ninth round of the 2025 Formula One World Championship and the 55th running of the Spanish Grand Prix as a round of the Formula One World Championship. This was the last Spanish Grand Prix held at the Circuit de Barcelona-Catalunya before being moved to Madring in Madrid from 2026 onward. The circuit would continue to host the Barcelona-Catalunya Grand Prix from 2026 onwards.

=== Championship standings before the race ===
Going into the weekend, Oscar Piastri led the Drivers' Championship with 161 points, three points ahead of his teammate Lando Norris in second, and 25 ahead of Max Verstappen in third. McLaren, with 319 points, led the Constructors' Championship from Mercedes and Red Bull Racing, who were second and third with 147 and 143 points, respectively.

=== Entrants ===
The drivers and teams were the same as published in the season entry list with two exceptions; Yuki Tsunoda at Red Bull Racing was in the seat originally held by Liam Lawson before the latter was demoted back to Racing Bulls from the Japanese Grand Prix onward, and Franco Colapinto replaced Jack Doohan at Alpine from the Emilia Romagna Grand Prix onward until at least the Austrian Grand Prix on a rotating seat basis. Following qualifying, Lance Stroll withdrew from the event due to experiencing pain in his hand and wrists.

During the first free practice session, two teams fielded drivers who had not raced in more than two Grands Prix, as required by the Formula One regulations:

- Ryō Hirakawa for Haas in place of Esteban Ocon.
- Victor Martins for Williams in place of Alexander Albon, making his Formula One practice debut.

=== Tyre choices ===
Tyre supplier Pirelli brought the C1, C2, and C3 tyre compounds (the three hardest in their range) designated hard, medium, and soft, respectively, for teams to use at the event.

== Practice ==
Three free practice sessions were held for the event. The first free practice session was held on 30 May 2025, at 13:30 local time (UTC+2), and was topped by Lando Norris of McLaren followed by Max Verstappen of Red Bull Racing and Lewis Hamilton of Ferrari. The second free practice session was held on the same day, at 17:00 local time, and was topped by Oscar Piastri of McLaren followed by George Russell of Mercedes and Verstappen. The third free practice session was held on 31 May 2025, at 12:30 local time, and was topped by Piastri ahead of his teammate Norris and Charles Leclerc of Ferrari.

== Qualifying ==
Qualifying was held on 31 May 2025, at 16:00 local time (UTC+2), and determined the starting grid order for the race.

=== Qualifying classification ===
Pos.	No.	Driver	Constructor	Qualifying times			Final grid
Pos.	No.	Driver	Constructor	Q1	Q2	Q3	Final grid
1	81	(Australia) Oscar Piastri	McLaren-Mercedes	1:12.551	1:11.998	1:11.546	1
2	4	(United Kingdom) Lando Norris	McLaren-Mercedes	1:12.799	1:12.056	1:11.755	2
3	1	(Netherlands) Max Verstappen	Red Bull Racing-Honda RBPT	1:12.798	1:12.358	1:11.848^{1}	3
4	63	(United Kingdom) George Russell	Mercedes	1:12.806	1:12.407	1:11.848^{1}	4
5	44	(United Kingdom) Lewis Hamilton	Ferrari	1:13.058	1:12.447	1:12.045	5
6	12	(Italy) Kimi Antonelli	Mercedes	1:12.815	1:12.585	1:12.111	6
7	16	(Monaco) Charles Leclerc	Ferrari	1:13.014	1:12.495	1:12.131	7
8	10	(France) Pierre Gasly	Alpine-Renault	1:13.081	1:12.611	1:12.199	8
9	6	(France) Isack Hadjar	Racing Bulls-Honda RBPT	1:13.139	1:12.461	1:12.252	9
10	14	(Spain) Fernando Alonso	Aston Martin Aramco-Mercedes	1:13.102	1:12.523	1:12.284	10
11	23	(Thailand) Alexander Albon	Williams-Mercedes	1:13.044	1:12.641	N/A	11
12	5	(Brazil) Gabriel Bortoleto	Kick Sauber-Ferrari	1:13.045	1:12.756	N/A	12
13	30	(New Zealand) Liam Lawson	Racing Bulls-Honda RBPT	1:13.039	1:12.763	N/A	13
14	18	(Canada) Lance Stroll	Aston Martin Aramco-Mercedes	1:13.038	1:13.058	N/A	—^{2}
15	87	(United Kingdom) Oliver Bearman	Haas-Ferrari	1:13.074	1:13.315	N/A	14
16	27	(Germany) Nico Hülkenberg	Kick Sauber-Ferrari	1:13.190	N/A	N/A	15
17	31	(France) Esteban Ocon	Haas-Ferrari	1:13.201	N/A	N/A	16
18	55	(Spain) Carlos Sainz Jr.	Williams-Mercedes	1:13.203	N/A	N/A	17
19	43	(Argentina) Franco Colapinto	Alpine-Renault	1:13.334	N/A	N/A	18
20	22	(Japan) Yuki Tsunoda	Red Bull Racing-Honda RBPT	1:13.385	N/A	N/A	PL^{3}
107% time: 1:17.629

Notes

- ^1 – Max Verstappen and George Russell set identical lap times in Q3. Verstappen qualified ahead of Russell as he set the time earlier.
- ^2 – Lance Stroll qualified 14th, but withdrew after experiencing pain in his hand and wrist. Drivers who qualified behind him gained a grid position.
- ^3 – Yuki Tsunoda qualified 20th, but was required to start the race from the pit lane as his car was modified under parc fermé conditions.

== Race ==
The race was held on 1 June 2025, at 15:00 local time (UTC+2), and was run for 66 laps.

=== Race report ===
Oscar Piastri of McLaren defended his pole position easily down the run to the first corner, whilst his teammate Lando Norris got a poorer start from second and was challenged by Max Verstappen of Red Bull Racing to the left and George Russell of Mercedes to the right. Verstappen ultimately took the position by braking late and driving around the outside of Norris through the turn 1 righthander, whilst Russell was overtaken in the same fashion by Lewis Hamilton of Ferrari, who moved up to fourth position. Russell was then passed by Hamilton's teammate Charles Leclerc at turn 5, who himself had got in front of Russell's teammate Kimi Antonelli during the run to turn 1. Further back in the pack, Liam Lawson of Racing Bull broke late into turn 1 and clipped the rear-right tyre of Aston Martin's driver Fernando Alonso. This caused Nico Hülkenberg of Sauber to take evasive action, which led him to making contact with Alexander Albon of Williams. Albon suffered front wing damage as a result, and he would pit to have it replaced.

At the start of lap 2, Hülkenberg passed Alonso into turn 1 to take 10th position, up from starting 15th. On lap 9, Hamilton was told to swap positions with his teammate Leclerc behind, allowing Leclerc to move into fourth place. On lap 13, Norris passed Verstappen into turn 1 to retake second position, with Verstappen pitting at the end of the lap to take a new set of soft tyres. Verstappen initially dropped to eighth place, but was able to make good use of the new rubber and quickly dispatch of those who were yet to pit. Indeed, Verstappen's new tyres were so effective that Verstappen was able to undercut the McLaren pair of Norris and Piastri after their pitstops on lap 21 and 22 respectively, propelling Verstappen into the race lead.

Meanwhile, Albon and Lawson were fiercely competing over twelfth position. Lawson's first attempt to overtake was on the inside of turn 1, which led to Albon cutting across the run-off area yet maintaining the position, much to Lawson's annoyance. Lawson then attempted to pass around the outside of the same corner one lap later, but on this occasion made contact with Albon's front wing, damaging it. With his race already compromised by the first front wing change, and now facing a second wing change with not even half the race completed, Albon was retired from the race on lap 28 after serving a penalty for leaving the track and gaining an advantage, as to avoid the penalty being applied as a grid drop for the next race in Canada.

Verstappen made his second stop at the end of lap 29, switching to medium tyres and rejoining in fourth position behind Piastri, Norris and Leclerc. This made it clear Verstappen intended to make three pit stops in the race, whilst the leading McLaren pair could make it to the finish on just two. After easily passing Leclerc into turn 1 on lap 35, Verstappen made his final planned stop on lap 48 to switch onto another set of soft tyres. The leading McLarens quickly responded to the risk of another undercut by themselves stopping, also switching to the softs. On lap 55, Antonelli, who had been running in seventh place, suffered an engine failure – his second in three races – and pulled off into the turn 10 gravel trap. This caused the safety car to be deployed, resulting in the top nine drivers making pitstops and taking fresh tyres for the restart. All these drivers switched to the soft tyre except Verstappen, who with no soft sets remaining was forced to take the hard compound – something which he expressed displeasure with over the team radio. As the drivers prepared to return to green flag running, the top ten was: Piastri, Norris, Verstappen, Leclerc, Russell, Hamilton, Isack Hadjar of Racing Bulls, Hülkenberg, Pierre Gasly of Alpine and Lawson.

The safety car came in at the end of lap 60. Verstappen, finding it difficult to warm his hard tyres, struggled to control the rear of his Red Bull as the field returned to speed through the turn 14 righthander. This compromised his exit onto the main straight, and allowed Leclerc to pull alongside. Despite the pair making contact, Leclerc was able to pass Verstappen into turn 1 to take third place. Russell braked late in an attempt to follow him through, diving up the inside of Verstappen and forcing the Red Bull driver to cut across the run-off. Verstappen took to the team radio to critique his competitors, accusing Leclerc of "ramming [him] on the straight" and refusing to comply with his engineer's request to let Russell through in order to protect against a potential penalty for leaving the track and gaining an advantage. On lap 64 Verstappen appeared to let Russell past on the exit of turn 4, but then deliberately dived back up the inside as the pair entered turn 5, leading to him making contact with Russell. Verstappen would ultimately let Russell through at turn 12 on the same lap, but would still receive a ten-second penalty for the collision.

Meanwhile, the McLaren pair completed their final lap without any drama, with Piastri crossing the line first to take his fifth Grand Prix win of the season and the seventh of his career. He was followed by teammate Norris, Leclerc, Russell and then Hülkenberg, who had passed Hamilton for the fifth place on the penultimate lap. Hülkenberg therefore secured his highest finish since the 2019 Italian Grand Prix and his team's highest since Valtteri Bottas also finished fifth during the 2022 Emilia Romagna Grand Prix, when they competed as Alfa Romeo. Despite an earlier trip into the gravel, Fernando Alonso finished ninth to secure his first championship points of the season.

=== Race classification ===
Pos.	No.	Driver	Constructor	Laps	Time/Retired	Grid	Points
1	81	(Australia) Oscar Piastri	McLaren-Mercedes	66	1:32:57.375	1	25
2	4	(United Kingdom) Lando Norris	McLaren-Mercedes	66	+2.471	2	18
3	16	(Monaco) Charles Leclerc	Ferrari	66	+10.455	7	15
4	63	(United Kingdom) George Russell	Mercedes	66	+11.359	4	12
5	27	(Germany) Nico Hülkenberg	Kick Sauber-Ferrari	66	+13.648	15	10
6	44	(United Kingdom) Lewis Hamilton	Ferrari	66	+15.508	5	8
7	6	(France) Isack Hadjar	Racing Bulls-Honda RBPT	66	+16.022	9	6
8	10	(France) Pierre Gasly	Alpine-Renault	66	+17.882	8	4
9	14	(Spain) Fernando Alonso	Aston Martin Aramco-Mercedes	66	+21.564	10	2
10	1	(Netherlands) Max Verstappen	Red Bull Racing-Honda RBPT	66	+21.826^{1}	3	1
11	30	(New Zealand) Liam Lawson	Racing Bulls-Honda RBPT	66	+25.532	13	
12	5	(Brazil) Gabriel Bortoleto	Kick Sauber-Ferrari	66	+25.996	12	
13	22	(Japan) Yuki Tsunoda	Red Bull Racing-Honda RBPT	66	+28.822	PL	
14	55	(Spain) Carlos Sainz Jr.	Williams-Mercedes	66	+29.309	17	
15	43	(Argentina) Franco Colapinto	Alpine-Renault	66	+31.381	18	
16	31	(France) Esteban Ocon	Haas-Ferrari	66	+32.197	16	
17	87	(United Kingdom) Oliver Bearman	Haas-Ferrari	66	+37.065^{2}	14	
Ret	12	(Italy) Kimi Antonelli	Mercedes	53	Oil pressure	6	
Ret	23	(Thailand) Alexander Albon	Williams-Mercedes	27	Collision damage	11	
WD	18	(Canada) Lance Stroll	Aston Martin Aramco-Mercedes	0	Driver injury	—^{3}	

Notes

- ^1 – Max Verstappen finished fifth, but received a ten-second time penalty for causing a collision with George Russell.
- ^2 – Oliver Bearman finished 13th, but received a ten-second time penalty for leaving the track and gaining an advantage.
- ^3 – Lance Stroll withdrew after experiencing pain in his hand and wrist. Drivers who qualified behind him gained a grid position.

== Championship standings after the race ==
Drivers' Championship standings

Pos.	Driver	Points
1	(Australia) Oscar Piastri	186
2	(United Kingdom) Lando Norris	176
3	(Netherlands) Max Verstappen	137
4	(United Kingdom) George Russell	111
5	(Monaco) Charles Leclerc	94

Constructors' Championship standings

	Pos.	Constructor	Points
	1	(United Kingdom) McLaren-Mercedes	362
2	2	(Italy) Ferrari	165
1	3	(Germany) Mercedes	159
1	4	(Austria) Red Bull Racing-Honda RBPT	144
	5	(United Kingdom) Williams-Mercedes	54

- Note: Only the top five positions are included for both sets of standings.

== See also ==
- 2025 Barcelona Formula 2 round
- 2025 Barcelona Formula 3 round

Previous race: 2025 Monaco Grand Prix	FIA Formula One World Championship; 2025 season	Next race: 2025 Canadian Grand Prix
Previous race: 2024 Spanish Grand Prix	Spanish Grand Prix	Next race: 2026 Spanish Grand Prix; Next race at the Circuit de Barcelona-Catalunya: 2026 Barcelona-Catalunya Grand Prix
