= Automechanika =

Automotive trade fair

Exhibition stand at Automechanika Frankfurt 2026

Automechanika is the world's biggest trade fair for the automobile aftermarket. It is held every two years (in even years) at the Messe Frankfurt. In distinction to the Motor Show, Automechanika is open to trading visitors only.

== History ==
On 20 January 1971, the organizer of the Frankfurt Motor Show, the Association of the German Automobile Industry (Verband der Deutschen Automobilindustrie – VDA) canceled the show scheduled to be held the following September. According to the President of the Association, Dr. Johann Heinrich von Brunn, this was because the automobile industry needed to take cost-saving measures to counteract the high costs facing it. The cost of the exhibition – almost DM 100 million – was considered to be excessive in comparison to the business benefits. For the Frankfurt-based fair and exhibition company, Messe Frankfurt, cancellation would have meant a loss of at least DM 1.5 to 2 million in revenues. In mid-March 1971, Messe Frankfurt announced that a new event – Automechanika 71 – would be held instead of the Motor Show. The initiative for this came from the associations of the motor-vehicle and filling station and garage trades that still wanted to present their products. Manufacturers of automotive parts account for around 90 percent of exhibitors at the Frankfurt Motor Show.

The first Automechanika was held from 18 to 26 September 1971 and attracted around 400 exhibitors and 75,000 visitors. The fair was repeated in 1972 and held thereafter every two years in alternation with the Frankfurt Motor Show.

== Development ==
The 25th Automechanika Frankfurt took place from 11 to 15 September 2018. Approx. 5,000 (2016: 4,820) exhibitors from 76 countries presented their products and services at the fairground of Messe Frankfurt in an area of 315,000 sqm. Around 135,000 visitors from 184 countries came to the show.

The latest Automechanika Frankfurt took place from 8 to 12 September 2026. 4,400 exhibitors from 80 countries presented their products and services at the fairground of Messe Frankfurt. Around 112,000 visitors from 173 countries came to the show.

The Automechanika trade fair brand has been exported to a variety of countries over recent years and 13 Automechanika fairs are currently held on five continents (Birmingham, Buenos Aires, Dubai, Frankfurt, Ho Chin Minh City, Istanbul, Johannesburg, Kuala Lumpur, Mexico-City, New Delhi, Nur-Sultan, Riyadh, Shanghai).

The 10th Automechanika Buenos Aires took place from 7 to 10 November 2018. 451 exhibitors from 17 countries presented their products and services at the fairground of Sociedad Rural Argentina in an area of 35,000 sqm. 26,644 visitors from 39 countries came to the show.

The latest Automechanika Buenos Aires took place from 11 to 14 October 2022. Over 282 exhibitors and 700 brands from 14 countries presented their products and services at the fairground of Sociedad Rural Argentina in an area of 35,000 sqm . 22,671 visitors from 33 countries came to the show.

== See also ==
- Motortec

== Links ==
- www.automechanika.com − Automechanika
- www.automechanika-frankfurt.com − Automechanika Frankfurt
- www.messefrankfurt.com − Messe Frankfurt
- www.driving-news.com − Blog
