= 2000 Spanish Grand Prix =

Formula One motor race held in 2000

Coordinates: 41°34′12″N 2°15′40″E

Race 5 of 17 in the 2000 Formula One World Championship
← Previous race	Next race →

Race details
- Date: 7 May 2000
- Official name: XLII Gran Premio Marlboro de España
- Location: Circuit de Catalunya, Montmeló, Catalonia, Spain
- Course: Permanent racing facility
- Course length: 4.730 km (2.939 miles)
- Distance: 65 laps, 307.450 km (190.962 miles)
- Weather: Sunny, Mild, Dry
- Attendance: 79,000

Pole position
Driver	(Germany) Michael Schumacher	Ferrari
- Time: 1:20.974

Fastest lap
Driver	(Finland) Mika Häkkinen	McLaren-Mercedes
- Time: 1:24.470 on lap 28

Podium
First	(Finland) Mika Häkkinen	McLaren-Mercedes
Second	(United Kingdom) David Coulthard	McLaren-Mercedes
Third	(Brazil) Rubens Barrichello	Ferrari

The 2000 Spanish Grand Prix (formally the XLII Gran Premio Marlboro de España) was a Formula One motor race held on 7 May 2000 at the Circuit de Catalunya, in Montmeló, Catalonia, Spain with approximately 79,000 spectators. It was the fifth round of the 2000 Formula One World Championship and the 42nd Spanish Grand Prix. Mika Häkkinen of McLaren won the 65-lap race after starting second. His teammate David Coulthard finished second, with Ferrari's Rubens Barrichello third.

Michael Schumacher led the World Drivers' Championship from Häkkinen, and Ferrari led the World Constructors' Championship from McLaren entering the race. He set the fastest qualifying lap to start on pole position and held off Häkkinen on the first lap. Schumacher led until his first pit stop on lap 24, when Ferrari chief mechanic Nigel Stepney was injured by Schumacher's right-rear tyre after Schumacher was incorrectly instructed to leave his box before the stop was completed. This moved Häkkinen to the race lead, which he held until his pit stop two laps later. Michael Schumacher led for the next 22 laps as he and Häkkinen made their second pit stops together, with Häkkinen taking the lead after a refuelling error slowed Schumacher's pit stop. Häkkinen led the final 22 laps to achieve his first win of the season and 15th of his career.

The victory moved Häkkinen into second place in the World Drivers' Championship, 14 championship points behind Michael Schumacher. Coulthard dropped to third after finishing second, and Barrichello's third place put him one championship point ahead of Ralf Schumacher. McLaren's one-two finish in the World Constructors' Championship brought them within seven championship points of leaders Ferrari. With 12 races remaining in the season, Williams remained third with 15 championship points.

== Background ==
The 2000 Spanish Grand Prix was the fifth of seventeen races in the 2000 Formula One World Championship, held on 7 May 2000, at the 4.730 km (2.939 mi) clockwise Circuit de Catalunya in Montmeló, Catalonia, Spain, following a two-week break from the preceding British Grand Prix. It was the 10th Spanish Grand Prix to be held at the Circuit de Catalunya. The Grand Prix featured eleven teams of two drivers each (each representing a different constructor), with no changes from the season entry list. Sole tyre supplier Bridgestone brought the soft and medium dry compound tyres to the event.

Before the race, Ferrari driver Michael Schumacher led the World Drivers' Championship with 34 championship points, ahead of McLaren teammates David Coulthard (14 championship points) and Mika Häkkinen (12 championship points). Ferrari's Rubens Barrichello and Williams' Ralf Schumacher were tied for fourth with nine championship points. Ferrari led the World Constructors' Championship with 43 championship points, 17 more than second-placed McLaren. Williams were third with twelve championship points, while Benetton and Jordan were fourth with eight points each.

Following the British Grand Prix on 23 April, all teams conducted in-season testing at the circuit from 25 to 28 April in preparation for the Spanish Grand Prix. Despite spinning into the gravel early in the session, Jos Verstappen was the fastest for Arrows on the first day of testing, ahead of McLaren test driver Olivier Panis. Michael Schumacher was the quickest on the second and third days. The third day was hampered by several drivers stopping on the circuit due to car problems. On the final day, which was held in wet weather in the morning and during the end of the session, Michael Schumacher again remained quickest.

Coulthard was leasing his friend and Rangers F.C. chairman David Murray's Learjet the week before the race when a ball bearing failure shut down the left engine en route to Côte d'Azur International Airport in Nice and crashed while attempting an emergency landing at Lyon-Satolas Airport in France. Coulthard, his then-girlfriend American model Heidi Wichlinski and personal trainer/bodyguard Andy Matthews survived; Murray's personal pilot David Saunders and co-pilot Dan Worley died. Coulthard sustained bruises to his right rib cage and severe grazed elbows in the crash. FIA Formula One Safety and Medical Delegate Sid Watkins declared Coulthard fit to race. Coulthard's survival from the accident was the main focus of comment in the motorsport media before the Grand Prix.

British American Racing (BAR) driver Jacques Villeneuve was passed fit prior to the event. At the Brazilian Grand Prix, Villeneuve sustained a back injury after his seat became loose during the race, and the worsening effects caused him to withdraw from testing in Barcelona. He also had to go through physiotherapy. Darren Manning, BAR's official test driver, was on standby to replace Villeneuve if necessary.

Some teams modified their cars for the event. Most teams continued to refine their vehicles' aerodynamic profiles, but no significant technical innovations were introduced at the Grand Prix. Minardi debuted Formula One's first titanium-constructed gearbox. It was 5 kg (11 lb) lighter than magnesium gearboxes, provided greater rigidity, and was cost-effective. Prost modified their cars' oil systems to improve engine reliability, and made minor aerodynamic changes to the front wing and floor. The team also used an updated Peugeot A20 EV2 engine during Friday's practice sessions before reverting to the EV3 for the rest of the weekend. BAR installed a new car aerodynamic packages, which included new bargeboards and rear wings. The Williams team equipped their cars with cast titanium hub carriers, but they were not used in the race because they interfered with the brake vents operation.

== Practice ==
The race was preceded by four practice sessions, two one-hour sessions on Friday and two 45-minute sessions on Saturday. The Friday practice sessions were dry and overcast, but previous rainfall and undercard events made the track dirty, preventing all but nine drivers from setting a time and seven attempted a quick lap. The fastest laps were recorded late in practice. Michael Schumacher led with a lap of 1:21.982 at his second attempt to set a fast time, half a second quicker than his teammate Barrichello in second. Häkkinen was third, Ralf Schumacher fourth and Prost's Jean Alesi fifth. The two Benetton drivers were sixth and eighth, Giancarlo Fisichella ahead of Alexander Wurz; Jaguar's Johnny Herbert was seventh. His teammate Eddie Irvine and Arrows' Jos Verstappen were ninth and tenth.

In the second practice session, Michael Schumacher was unable to lap faster but remained fastest; Ralf Schumacher went second-fastest with a new set of tyres towards the end of the session. In positions three through ten were Barrichello, Jordan's Jarno Trulli, Coulthard, Williams' Jenson Button. Häkkinen, Sauber's Pedro Diniz, Jordan's Heinz-Harald Frentzen and Alesi. Pedro de la Rosa lost control of his Arrows car under braking and was beached in the gravel trap, prompting the yellow flags to appear briefly. Fisichella spun 360 degrees backwards into the gravel trap at the Renault corner, then spun again at the next right-hand turn.

The weather remained dry for the Saturday morning practice sessions. Coulthard set the third session's fastest lap, 1:21.370, ahead of teammate Häkkinen, who was two-tenths of a second slower; both drivers set their fastest times on new tyres. Ralf Schumacher, Michael Schumacher, Villeneuve, Fisichella and Frentzen made up positions three to seven. The two Arrows drivers were eighth and ninth (with Verstappen ahead of De la Rosa) after setting identical lap times that topped the time sheets. Sauber's Mika Salo was tenth-fastest. During practice, no yellow flags were waved, though Frentzen briefly drove onto the grass late in the session.

During the final practice session, Michael Schumacher set the fastest lap of 1:21.088 on new tyres; Coulthard was second. Barrichello was third fastest after finishing 14th the previous session. He lapped faster than Häkkinen, who struggled with a lack of grip and a loose rear end. Ralf Schumacher set the fifth-fastest time. Jordan's drivers were sixth and seventh, Trulli ahead of Frentzen and ahead of De la Rosa, Villeneuve, and Button.

== Qualifying ==
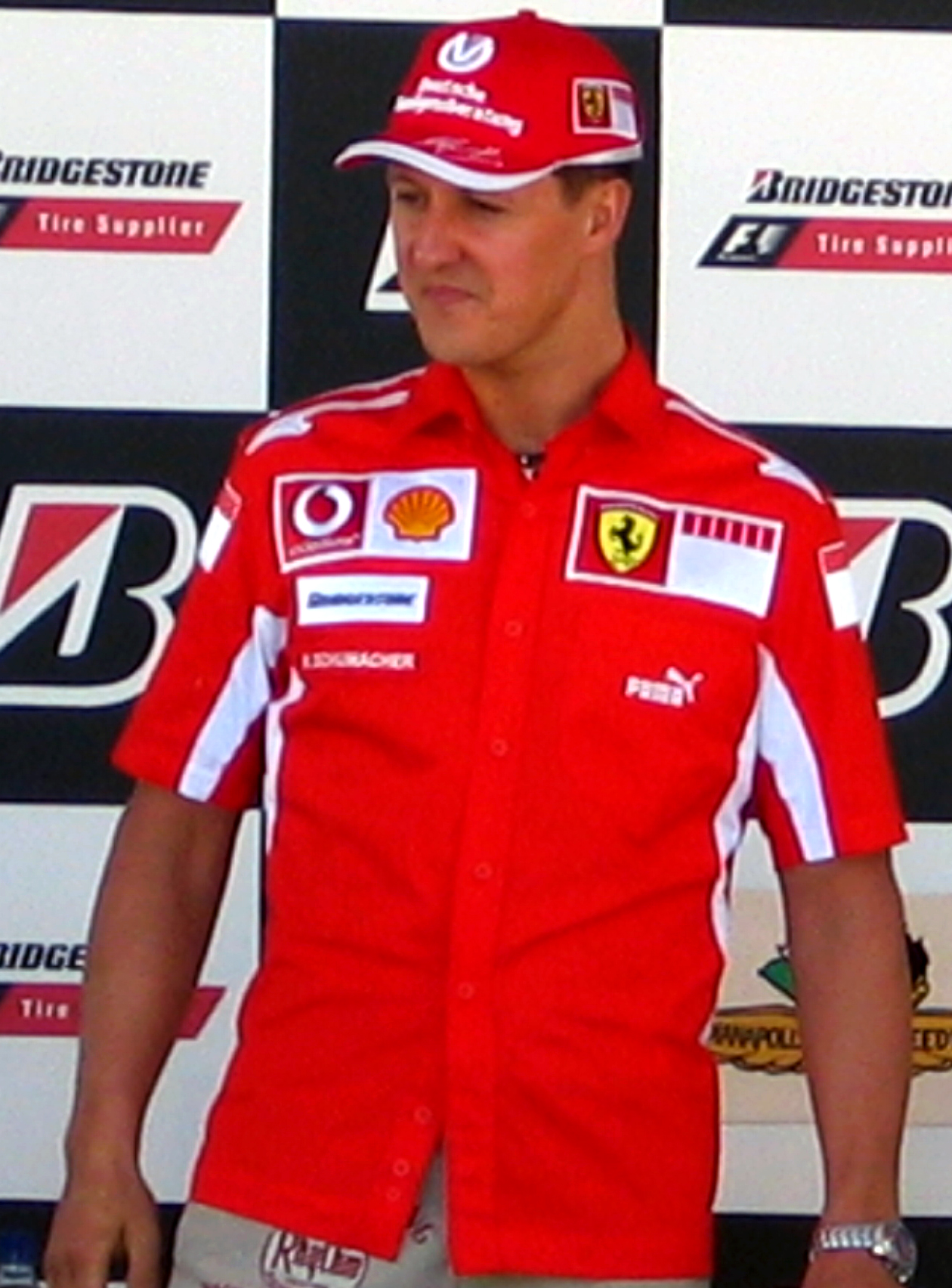
Michael Schumacher (pictured in 2005) who took his first pole position of the season.

Saturday afternoon's one-hour qualifying session saw each driver limited to twelve laps, with the grid order decided by their fastest laps. During this session, the 107% rule was in effect, requiring each driver to remain within 107 per cent of the fastest lap time to qualify for the race. The session was held in sunny and hot weather. Michael Schumacher took his first pole position of the season and 24th of his career with a time of 1:20.974 on a headwind-affected second run 43 minutes in, going more than a second quicker than the 1999 pole lap. Häkkinen joined him on the grid's front row after lapping 0.076 seconds slower in the final seconds and held pole until Schumacher's lap. Barrichello qualified third, feeling his car did not feel good having not made any changes. Coulthard, fourth, lost time early in qualifying due to an engine fuel pressure pick-up issue, meaning he had to drive with 10 kg (22 lb) of extra fuel. He did not drive the spare McLaren set up for Häkkinen, believing it to be time-consuming, and he had to drive with extra fuel added by his mechanics. Ralf Schumacher, fifth, had excessive oversteer, which prevented him from lapping faster. Villeneuve qualified sixth and said he achieved the best from his car. Both Jordan drivers lined up the grid's fourth row (with Trulli ahead of Frentzen), believing they could have a better starting position because of windy conditions.

De la Rosa and Irvine were ninth and tenth. Later that day, the FIA in a mobile laboratory analysed a fuel sample from De la Rosa's car and declared it illegal because it did not match an earlier sample. Arrows team principal Tom Walkinshaw insisted it was caused by contamination during transit and the team announced it would appeal the decision, allowing De la Rosa to keep his starting spot. Button. eleventh, reported crosswinds made his car unstable. He was faster than Verstappen in the slower Arrows car, Salo in the faster Sauber after losing time in the first third of the lap, and Fisichella, who could not lap faster due to low track grip. Herbert, 15th, lost his front wing mounted television camera held on by a thin cable after hitting a kerb early in qualifying. He made a minor error that prevented him from qualifying higher. Diniz (16th) had excessive oversteer. Ricardo Zonta, seventeenth, was unable to find a suitable set-up for his BAR car, and his best lap was nine-tenths of a second slower than teammate Villeneuve's. Alesi qualified eighteenth and was unable to lap faster due to hydraulic issues and circuit cooling. He was ahead of Wurz in nineteenth, who struggled with grip and car setup. Heidfeld's engine failed on the circuit, and marshals extinguished a small fire when he returned to the pit lane. He drove the spare Prost car setup for his teammate Alesi and qualified 20th. The two Minardi drivers Marc Gené and Gastón Mazzacane were 21st and 22nd.

=== Qualifying classification ===
Pos	No	Driver	Constructor	Lap	Gap	Grid
1	3	(Germany) Michael Schumacher	Ferrari	1:20.974	—	1
2	1	(Finland) Mika Häkkinen	McLaren-Mercedes	1:21.052	+0.078	2
3	4	(Brazil) Rubens Barrichello	Ferrari	1:21.416	+0.442	3
4	2	(United Kingdom) David Coulthard	McLaren-Mercedes	1:21.422	+0.448	4
5	9	(Germany) Ralf Schumacher	Williams-BMW	1:21.605	+0.631	5
6	22	(Canada) Jacques Villeneuve	BAR-Honda	1:21.963	+0.989	6
7	6	(Italy) Jarno Trulli	Jordan-Mugen-Honda	1:22.006	+1.032	7
8	5	(Germany) Heinz-Harald Frentzen	Jordan-Mugen-Honda	1:22.135	+1.161	8
9	18	(Spain) Pedro de la Rosa	Arrows-Supertec	1:22.185	+1.211	22^{1}
10	7	(United Kingdom) Eddie Irvine	Jaguar-Cosworth	1:22.370	+1.396	9
11	10	(United Kingdom) Jenson Button	Williams-BMW	1:22.385	+1.411	10
12	19	(Netherlands) Jos Verstappen	Arrows-Supertec	1:22.421	+1.447	11
13	17	(Finland) Mika Salo	Sauber-Petronas	1:22.443	+1.469	12
14	11	(Italy) Giancarlo Fisichella	Benetton-Playlife	1:22.569	+1.595	13
15	8	(United Kingdom) Johnny Herbert	Jaguar-Cosworth	1:22.781	+1.807	14
16	16	(Brazil) Pedro Diniz	Sauber-Petronas	1:22.841	+1.867	15
17	23	(Brazil) Ricardo Zonta	BAR-Honda	1:22.882	+1.908	16
18	14	(France) Jean Alesi	Prost-Peugeot	1:22.894	+1.920	17
19	12	(Austria) Alexander Wurz	Benetton-Playlife	1:23.010	+2.036	18
20	15	(Germany) Nick Heidfeld	Prost-Peugeot	1:23.033	+2.059	19
21	20	(Spain) Marc Gené	Minardi-Fondmetal	1:23.486	+2.512	20
22	21	(Argentina) Gastón Mazzacane	Minardi-Fondmetal	1:24.257	+3.283	21
107% time: 1:26.642

Note:

- ^1 — Pedro de la Rosa had started at the back of the grid for using illegal fuel in qualifying.

== Warm-up ==
The drivers took to the track at 09:30 Central European Summer Time (UTC+2) for a 30-minute warm-up in cool and dry weather. Despite going into the gravel after braking too deeply, Michael Schumacher set a lap of 1:22.855 to lead a session for the fifth time that weekend, and also drove the spare Ferrari. Häkkinen was second-fastest; Barrichello was third, followed by Coulthard in fourth. De la Rosa ran into the gravel trap at Elf corner after his engine cut out; he returned to the pit lane to use the spare Arrows vehicle. Coulthard was launched airborne during a lap when he mounted the kerb at the final turn, but his vehicle was undamaged. After the session, Arrows withdrew their appeal after accepting the FIA's findings, and De la Rosa was required to start at the back of the field.

== Race ==
The grid conditions were dry and particularly cloudy before the Grand Prix; the air temperature ranged between 21 and 30 °C (70 and 86 °F) and the track temperature was between 22 and 23 °C (72 and 73 °F). The race, which began before approximately 79,000 people at 14:00 local time, lasted 65 laps on a dry track for 307.450 km (191.041 mi). Michael Schumacher and Häkkinen intended to make two pit stops during the Grand Prix, with Schumacher, the only driver in the field, opting for medium compound tyres rather than soft compound tyres. Ralf Schumacher began in a spare Williams car after his race car developed an engine sensor problem the day before. There was not an abundance of overtaking, so the race was decided by pit stops.

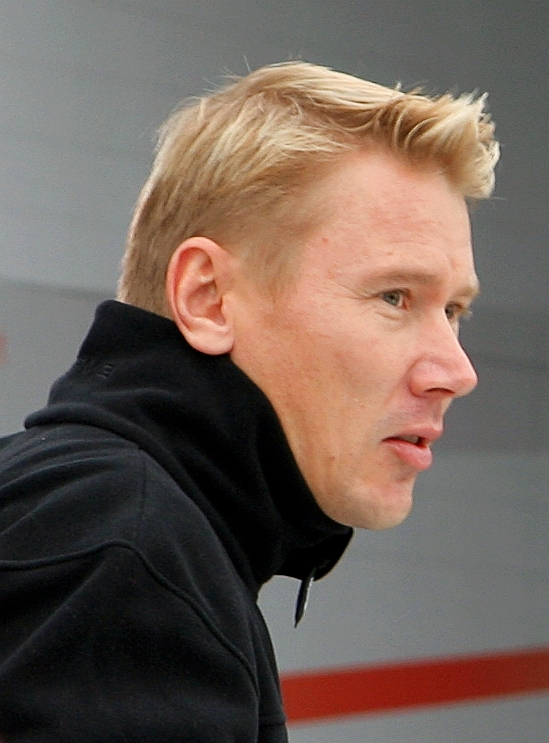
Mika Häkkinen (pictured in 2006) took his first victory of the season in the race.

Häkkinen made a better start than Michael Schumacher, who steered right across the circuit to block Häkkinen's path on the outside when the race began. Consequently, Häkkinen was unable to make a strong challenge to Michael Schumacher while braking for Elf corner. Ralf Schumacher got away quickly, passing Coulthard and the slow-starting Barrichello for third. Ralf Schumacher collided with the rear of Häkkinen's car on a large amount of dust as it exited the first right-hand turn, sending Häkkinen slightly sideways. Both drivers were able to continue, with Häkkinen ahead of Ralf Schumacher by being on the inside for the next left-hand turn. By the end of the first lap, Button had moved up from eleventh to ninth, while Irvine had dropped three places. Diniz retired after spinning into the gravel after driving onto dirt on the outside of turn three. At the conclusion of lap one, the top six drivers were Michael Schumacher, Häkkinen, Ralf Schumacher, Coulthard, Barrichello, and Villeneuve.

Michael Schumacher began to pull away from Häkkinen. On lap two, De la Rosa collided with Alesi's rear at Wurth corner, forcing Alesi to retire. De la Rosa's front wing broke and retired after beaching in the gravel trap at Campsa corner. Simultaneously, Irvine overtook Verstappen for twelfth position. For the next 16 laps, the gap between Michael Schumacher and the heavily-fuelled Häkkinen fluctuated from 1.6 seconds to 3.4 seconds due to driving through slower traffic, while Coulthard and Barrichello battled Ralf Schumacher for third place. Further back, Villeneuve was delaying Frentzen, Trulli, Button, Salo as the top five pulled away. Green flag pit stops began on the 18th lap, with three drivers stopping. On the next lap, Button made his first pit stop and rejoined in front of Mazzacane. Villeneuve made his only pit stop on the 22nd lap; Frentzen was promoted to sixth. After rejoining the circuit, his car caught fire after telemetry detected a drop in fuel pressure, and he pulled off the track at the exit of the long right-hand Renault corner. Trulli's pit stop, which dropped him to 17th, proved problematic: he stalled his engine, requiring his mechanics to restart it. Ralf Schumacher made a pit stop one lap later and rejoined in fifth.

On lap 24, Michael Schumacher made his pit stop. Mechanic Federico Ugozzoni raised the signboard a second before the fuel hose was removed from the Ferrari and Schumacher accelerated from his pit box. Two mechanics attempted to remove the clogged fuel hose from the car's receptacle. Schumacher's right rear wheel struck Ferrari's chief mechanic, Nigel Stepney, who was assisting the refueller. Stepney was dragged before being knocked over; he was taken to the circuit's medical centre for observation before an X-ray examination in Paris revealed a compound fracture of the tibia and stretched leg tendons. Stepney, who was replaced by reserve refuller Andrea Vacari, was ruled out for the following two Grands Prix. Coulthard made a pit stop on the same lap and had trouble exiting his pit box because he selected second gear. He re-emerged behind Ralf Schumacher. At the end of lap 26, Häkkinen made his first pit stop and fell behind Michael Schumacher. On the next lap, Verstappen retired in the pit lane due to a gear selection fault.

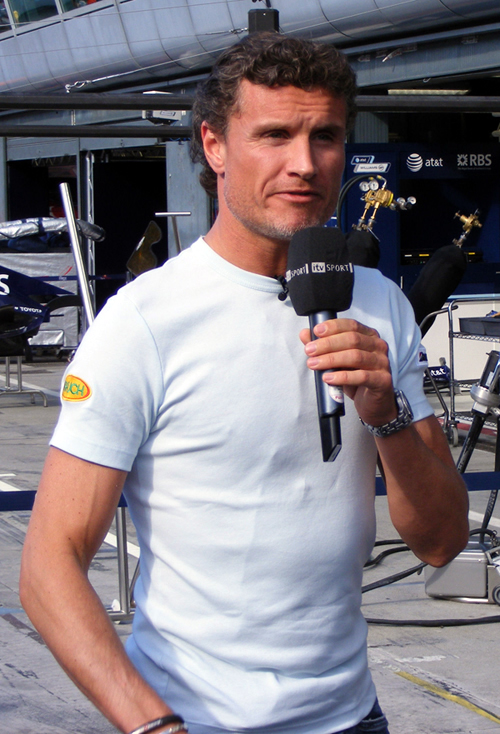
David Coulthard (pictured in 2007) finished second.

All the leaders had made their stops by the start of lap 28. The top six in the running order were Michael Schumacher, Häkkinen, Ralf Schumacher, Barrichello, Coulthard and Button. Häkkinen set the race's fastest lap on the same lap, a 1:24.470 as he started to gain on Michael Schumacher because he was on the softer tyre compound. Ralf Schumacher again was pressured by Coulthard in fourth. Häkkinen did not attempt to overtake the race leader, as Michael Schumacher was on the harder compound tyres. Twelve laps later, Coulthard entered the pit lane for seven-and-a-half seconds in his attempt to pass Ralf Schumacher and Barrichello. This triggered the second round of pit stops for the front-runners. Ralf Schumacher and Barrichello made a pit stop on the following lap and rejoined behind Coulthard after being overtaken by Coulthard on the outside at Elf corner. Michael Schumacher and Häkkinen made their pit stops on the 42nd lap, with Häkkinen emerging ahead after a stop lasting 6.7 seconds because Michael Schumacher's pit stop was problematic. The mechanics began refuelling as Vacari had trouble putting the fuel pump into the fuel tank neck after the tyres were installed. This meant Schumacher was stationary for ten seconds longer than usual. Salo and Zonta entered the pit lane on lap 45, promoting Button to sixth.

Coulthard closed up to Michael Schumacher (who was slowed by around 1.5 to 2 seconds per lap with air leaking from his left rear tyre causing a slow puncture) by lap 46. Coulthard attempted to overtake Michael Schumacher on the inside of the pit lane straight into the first corner of the following lap, intending to slow Schumacher at the right-hand turn. As a blocking manoeuvre, Schumacher steered right into Coulthard's path at the last possible moment. The two drivers narrowly avoided a collision and Coulthard almost drove onto the grass. Michael Schumacher's left-rear tyre slowed him at the last right-hand turn. Coulthard had better traction and steered to the outside on lap 48, passing Michael Schumacher (who steered right to defend) by braking later into Elf corner. Ralf Schumacher drew close to Michael Schumacher on the 50th lap. Ralf Schumacher attempted to overtake Michael Schumacher on the outside on the same lap at La Caixa corner, but was blocked by his elder brother. Ralf Schumacher was forced wide, losing momentum, and pulling back into the following Banc Sabadell turn. This allowed Barrichello to pass both drivers on the inside for third.

Michael Schumacher entered the pit lane on lap 51 for a new set of tyres. He remained fifth, ahead of Button, who was significantly behind Schumacher. He immediately set new personal fastest laps in an effort to catch Ralf Schumacher. However, the order was stable at the front of the field, with Häkkinen leading significantly over Coulthard and Ralf Schumacher dropping back from Barrichello. Button, sixth, retired at the side of the circuit on lap 63, with smoke billowing from his engine that failed without warning. Häkkinen maintained his lead to achieve his first victory of 2000 and the 15th of his Formula One career following the 1999 Japanese Grand Prix the previous season in a time of 1:33.55.390 at an average speed of 196.324 km/h (121.990 mph) after 65 laps. Coulthard drove with three cracked right-hand side eighth and tenth ribs, as well as a bruised right chest wall. He finished second, 16 seconds behind his teammate. Barrichello was third, with Ralf Schumacher fourth, Michael Schumacher fifth and Frentzen was the final points-scorer in sixth. Salo, Zonta, Fisichella, Wurz and Irvine were the next five finishers, and Trulli, Herbert, Gené (who lacked fuel in his car), Mazzacane, Heidfeld and Button (despite his retirement) were the final classified finishers.

=== Post-race ===
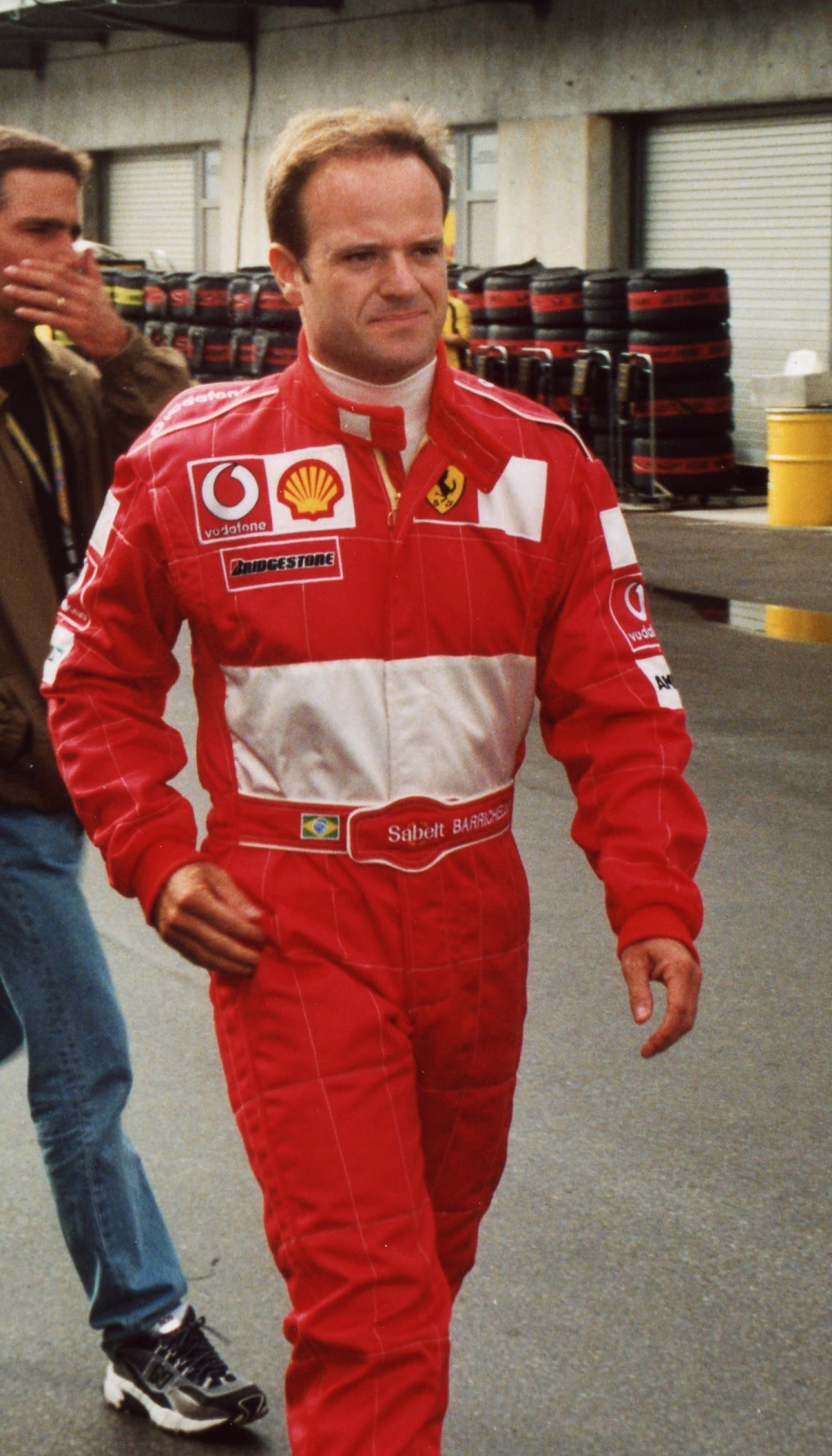
Rubens Barrichello (pictured in 2002) finished third.

The top three drivers appeared on the podium to receive their trophies and later spoke at a press conference. Häkkinen said that he was "pleased" to win the race, and admitted to waiting until the pit stop phase to have any chance of overtaking Michael Schumacher. He said that McLaren had more work to do on his car and was looking forward to the next race. Coulthard believed he made the right decision to race despite his injuries, and that the result was "the best thing that could have happened for the team and myself." He also said he was looking forward to resting over the coming days to allow his injuries to heal. Barrichello admitted that the race had not been good for him until his overtake on Michael Schumacher and Ralf Schumacher, and said the absence of Stepney caused his second pit stop to be slower than usual.

Attention focused on the battle between Ralf Schumacher and Michael Schumacher during the race. Michael Schumacher blamed his brother for the move and did not understand why he was upset about it. Ralf Schumacher made no comment and stated that he would watch a video of the incident before commenting. Rolf, their father, spoke with the two brothers in an attempt to reconcile the two drivers. Ralf Schumacher said a week after the race that tensions between him and his brother had subsided and that there was no resentment between them, saying, "It's a lot of fun when we are out there on the track duelling against each other." There was similar ill-feeling between De la Rosa and Alesi after their collision on lap two. Alesi accused De la Rosa of blocking him and causing the crash by failing to check his mirrors, while De la Rosa claimed he tried to overtake him in a difficult corner.

Ron Dennis, the McLaren team owner, called it "very good outcome" and was pleased with his team's strategy, saying: "It's a great day, particularly satisfying not only when you think of the pressure that's unique to catching up, but also the circumstances of the week, with David's accident." Ferrari team principal Jean Todt admitted that his team were disappointed with their final result, but added: "However, we have always known that even a big advantage can easily be reduced. It was a good fight between Michael and Hakkinen, at least up to the second pitstop." Following the race, Michael Schumacher apologised to Stepney for injuring him.

The final results moved Häkkinen from third to second in the World Drivers' Championship, reducing Michael Schumacher's lead from 20 to 14 championship points. Coulthard's second-place finish dropped him to third, two points behind Häkkinen. Ralf Schumacher fell to fifth with 12 championship points, while Barrichello moved to fourth with 13 championship points. Ferrari maintained their World Constructors' Championship lead, but McLaren's one-two finish brought them within seven championship points. Williams remained third with nine championship points. Frentzen's sixth-place finish moved Jordan into fourth place, one championship point ahead of Benetton in fifth, with twelve races remaining in the season.

=== Race classification ===
Drivers who scored championship points are denoted in bold.

Pos	No	Driver	Constructor	Laps	Time/Retired	Grid	Points
1	1	(Finland) **Mika Häkkinen**	**McLaren-Mercedes**	65	1:33:55.390	2	10
2	2	(United Kingdom) **David Coulthard**	**McLaren-Mercedes**	65	+16.066	4	6
3	4	(Brazil) **Rubens Barrichello**	**Ferrari**	65	+29.112	3	4
4	9	(Germany) **Ralf Schumacher**	**Williams-BMW**	65	+37.311	5	3
5	3	(Germany) **Michael Schumacher**	**Ferrari**	65	+47.983	1	2
6	5	(Germany) **Heinz-Harald Frentzen**	**Jordan-Mugen-Honda**	65	+1:21.925	8	1
7	17	(Finland) Mika Salo	Sauber-Petronas	64	+1 lap	12	
8	23	(Brazil) Ricardo Zonta	BAR-Honda	64	+1 lap	16	
9	11	(Italy) Giancarlo Fisichella	Benetton-Playlife	64	+1 lap	13	
10	12	(Austria) Alexander Wurz	Benetton-Playlife	64	+1 lap	18	
11	7	(United Kingdom) Eddie Irvine	Jaguar-Cosworth	64	+1 lap	9	
12	6	(Italy) Jarno Trulli	Jordan-Mugen-Honda	64	+1 lap	7	
13	8	(United Kingdom) Johnny Herbert	Jaguar-Cosworth	64	+1 lap	14	
14	20	(Spain) Marc Gené	Minardi-Fondmetal	63	+2 laps	20	
15	21	(Argentina) Gastón Mazzacane	Minardi-Fondmetal	63	+2 laps	21	
16	15	(Germany) Nick Heidfeld	Prost-Peugeot	62	+3 laps	19	
17	10	(United Kingdom) Jenson Button	Williams-BMW	61	Engine	10	
Ret	19	(Netherlands) Jos Verstappen	Arrows-Supertec	25	Gearbox	11	
Ret	22	(Canada) Jacques Villeneuve	BAR-Honda	21	Hydraulics	6	
Ret	14	(France) Jean Alesi	Prost-Peugeot	1	Collision	17	
Ret	18	(Spain) Pedro de la Rosa	Arrows-Supertec	1	Collision	22	
Ret	16	(Brazil) Pedro Diniz	Sauber-Petronas	0	Spun off	15	

== Championship standings after the race ==
Drivers' Championship standings

+/–	Pos	Driver	Points
	1	(Germany) Michael Schumacher	36
1	2	(Finland) Mika Häkkinen	22
1	3	(United Kingdom) David Coulthard	20
	4	(Brazil) Rubens Barrichello	13
	5	(Germany) Ralf Schumacher	12

Constructors' Championship standings

+/–	Pos	Constructor	Points
	1	(Italy) Ferrari	49
	2	(United Kingdom) McLaren-Mercedes	42
	3	(United Kingdom) Williams-BMW	15
1	4	(Republic of Ireland) Jordan-Mugen-Honda	9
1	5	(Italy) Benetton-Playlife	8
Sources:

- Note: Only the top five positions are included for both sets of standings.

Previous race: 2000 British Grand Prix	FIA Formula One World Championship; 2000 season	Next race: 2000 European Grand Prix
Previous race: 1999 Spanish Grand Prix	Spanish Grand Prix	Next race: 2001 Spanish Grand Prix
