= SIMO TCI =

- Status: Defunct
- Genre: Computer expo
- Frequency: Annually
- Venue: IFEMA
- Location: Madrid
- Country: Spain
- Inaugurated: 1961
- Most recent: 2013
- Attendance: 246,500 (1998)
- Organizer: Fundación CITEMA (until 1994) / IFEMA (since 1994)
- Website: simo.ifema.es

SIMO TCI was a computer expo held every November in Madrid, Spain from 1961 to 2013. Its name stands for Salón Internacional de Mobiliario de Oficina / Tecnologías de la Comunicación e Información (International Trade Fair of Office Furniture / Information and Communication Technologies), due to its origin. From 1991, it took place in Madrid's Exhibition Centre IFEMA.

== History ==
It was conceived as a trade fair devoted to office furniture and its first edition was held in 1961. In 1962 the IBM 1401 and Bull Gamma 60 where showcased, and as electronic, computer and telecommunications equipment were being introduced, the trade fair was gradually turned into a computer expo, to the extent that it would end up moving office furniture to a separate fair. Since 1969, there was more space devoted to computers that to office furniture, but until the late 1980s there was some exhibition space devoted to office furniture.

In its most successful years from late 1990s to early 2000s, it was considered the second largest computer fair in Europe after CeBIT, as more than 900 exhibitors were present, distributed in 65,000 m^{2} taking up eight IFEMA pavilions, and reaching up 300,000 visitors.

In the late 2000s the number of exhibitors started to decline. This led to the cancellation of the 2008 edition. In 2009 was resumed as SIMO Network, devoted exclusively to business-oriented computing and IT professionals, but this approach wasn't successful and the last SIMO TCI took place in 2013.

Taking advantage of the name, SIMO Educación (SIMO Education) was started in 2014 by IFEMA, devoted only to educational technologies and a much smaller scope (taking up only one pavilion and reaching up about 10,000 visitors).

== Sectors (early 2000s) ==
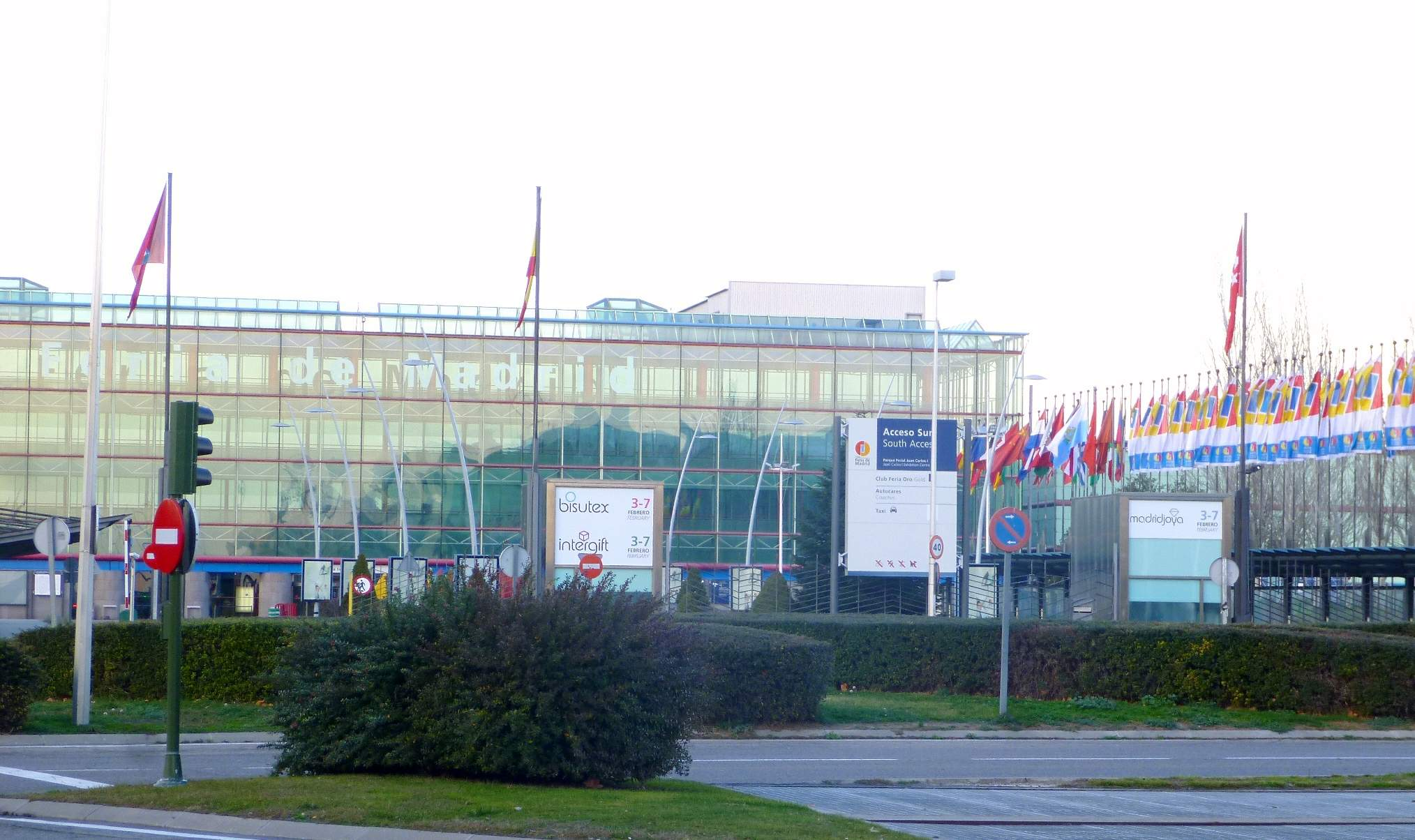
IFEMA main entrance

- Information technologies: computers, terminals, peripheral devices, components, consumables, audiovisuals, electronics
  - Reproduction
  - Office technology
  - Macworld Exposition
  - Digital photography
- Professional software: operating systems and programming languages, vertical and horizontal applications. CAD/CAM/CAE, multimedia.
  - Architecture Software
  - Linux area
- Telecommunications: communications, mobile telephony, local area networks, interconnectivity, services, servers and operators
- E-business-Internet
- Consumer electronics
- Domotics

== Number of visitors ==
Year	Visitors
1961	8000
1970	70000
1982	150000
1985	175000
1992	225000
1994	111000
1995	177000
1996	243000
1997	263000
1998	246000
1999	257000
2000	260000
2001	270000
2002	272000
2003	280000
2004	286000
2005	285000
2006	288000
2007	291000
2009	20000
2010	18000
2011	18000
2012	18000
2013	22000
2014	7500
2015	8000
2018	10000
2019	10000

== See also ==
- CeBIT
- Consumer Electronics Show
