= 2026 Spanish Grand Prix =

Formula One motor race

Race 14 of 23 in the 2026 Formula One World Championship
← Previous race	Next race →
- Layout of the Circuito de Madring, Spain

Race details
- Date: 13 September 2026
- Official name: Formula 1 TAG Heuer Gran Premio de España 2026
- Location: Madring, Madrid, Spain
- Course: Street circuit
- Course length: 5.414 km (3.364 miles)
- Distance: 57 laps, 308.399 km (191.630 miles)
- Weather: Sunny. Max. ambient temp. 31.8°C, max. track temp. 54.9°C.
- Attendance: 353,000

Pole position
Driver	(United Kingdom) Lando Norris	McLaren-Mercedes
- Time: 1:31.824

Fastest lap
Driver	(United Kingdom) George Russell	Mercedes
- Time: 1:35.587 on lap 49 (lap record)

Podium
First	(Italy) Kimi Antonelli	Mercedes
Second	(Netherlands) Max Verstappen	Red Bull Racing-Red Bull Ford
Third	(United Kingdom) Lando Norris	McLaren-Mercedes

The 2026 Spanish Grand Prix (officially known as the Formula 1 TAG Heuer Gran Premio de España 2026) was a Formula One motor race that was held on 13 September 2026, at the Madring in Madrid, Spain, as the first running of the Spanish Grand Prix at the newly-constructed Madring track. It was the fourteenth round of the 2026 Formula One World Championship. Lando Norris (McLaren) took pole position for the race, and finished the race in second to Kimi Antonelli (Mercedes). Max Verstappen (Red Bull) completed the podium.

== Background ==
Formula One was held at the Madring in Madrid for the first time in the circuit's history, and for the first time as a host for the Spanish Grand Prix, across the weekend of 11–13 September. Spanish Grand Prix was previously hosted at the Circuit de Barcelona-Catalunya in Montmeló, Spain, which now hosts the Barcelona-Catalunya Grand Prix on rotation with the Belgian Grand Prix. The Grand Prix was the fourteenth round of the 2026 Formula One World Championship and the 56th running of the Spanish Grand Prix as a round of the Formula One World Championship.

=== Championship standings before the race ===
Going into the weekend, Kimi Antonelli led the Drivers' Championship with 267 points, 66 points ahead of teammate George Russell in second and 76 ahead of Lewis Hamilton in third. Mercedes, with 468 points, led the Constructors' Championship from Ferrari and McLaren, who were second and third with 346 and 287 points, respectively.

=== Entrants ===
The drivers and teams were the same as published in the season entry list, with the exception of Isack Hadjar at Red Bull, who injured his wrist leading into the Dutch Grand Prix and was again unable to compete. Like the previous two Grands Prix, he was again replaced by Liam Lawson. Red Bull reserve driver Yuki Tsunoda replaced Lawson at Racing Bulls.

=== Tyre choices ===
Tyre supplier Pirelli selected its C2, C3, and C4 compounds—the middle three in its range—for the event, designating them as hard, medium, and soft, respectively.

== Practice ==
Three free practice sessions were held for the event. The first free practice session was held on 11 September 2026, at 13:30 local time (UTC+2), and was topped by George Russell (Mercedes) ahead of his teammate Kimi Antonelli and Charles Leclerc (Ferrari). The second free practice session was held on the same day, at 17:00 local time, and was topped by Antonelli ahead of Leclerc and his teammate Lewis Hamilton. A red flag was observed after Arvid Lindblad (Racing Bulls) hit the wall at turn 13. The third free practice session was held on 12 September 2026, at 12:30 local time, and was topped by Antonelli ahead of Leclerc and Oscar Piastri (McLaren). The session was red-flagged twice; the first came after Hamilton crashed into the wall at turn 22, while the second was observed in the closing stages after Oliver Bearman (Haas) hit the wall at turn 10.

== Qualifying ==
Qualifying was held on 12 September 2026, at 16:00 local time (UTC+2), and determined the starting grid order for the race.

=== Qualifying report ===
Q1, the opening part of qualifying, began with the Cadillac drivers leading the field out of the pit lane. Kimi Antonelli (Mercedes) set the initial pace on soft tyres, while Max Verstappen (Red Bull) and the Ferrari drivers, Lewis Hamilton and Charles Leclerc, used the medium compound. Liam Lawson (Red Bull) subsequently moved to the top, while Antonelli abandoned another attempt after locking up and narrowly avoiding the barrier. George Russell (Mercedes) brushed the wall but improved on his final run to lead Antonelli, Lawson and Verstappen. Alexander Albon (Williams) secured the final place in Q2 (the second part of qualifying) by 0.005 seconds over team-mate Carlos Sainz Jr., who was eliminated alongside Fernando Alonso (Aston Martin) and Sergio Pérez and Valtteri Bottas (both Cadillac). Oliver Bearman (Haas) did not participate because his car could not be repaired in time following his crash in final practice, while Lance Stroll (Aston Martin) was unable to run owing to a suspected water-pressure problem. Sainz subsequently received a three-place grid penalty for impeding Bottas.

Antonelli again established the early benchmark in Q2, before Verstappen moved ahead by 0.046 seconds. Franco Colapinto (Alpine) abandoned his first attempt after a slide through the banked La Monumental corner, leaving both Alpine drivers without a time until the closing minutes. Colapinto recovered to advance in eighth, while Verstappen finished fastest, 0.160 seconds ahead of Antonelli, followed by Hamilton, Leclerc, Lawson, Russell and Lando Norris (McLaren). Oscar Piastri (McLaren) and Arvid Lindblad (Racing Bulls) took the final two places in Q3 (the final part of qualifying) with identical times of 1:33.204. Nico Hülkenberg (Audi) was the fastest driver eliminated, missing the cutoff by 0.019 seconds; he was followed by team-mate Gabriel Bortoleto, Esteban Ocon (Haas), Pierre Gasly (Alpine), Yuki Tsunoda (Racing Bulls) and Albon. Gasly lost an earlier attempt to double yellow flags, while Tsunoda had a lap deleted for exceeding track limits.

Hamilton held provisional pole after the opening Q3 runs with a time of 1:32.079, ahead of Antonelli and Russell; Leclerc was fourth, followed by Verstappen and the two McLarens, with Norris sixth. Antonelli moved to the top on his final attempt with a 1:31.835, while Hamilton improved but was unable to reclaim first place. Norris then set a 1:31.824 despite a slide at the final corner, beating Antonelli by 0.011 seconds. Verstappen improved to third, 0.140 seconds behind Norris, while Hamilton and Leclerc qualified fourth and fifth, separated by 0.006 seconds. Russell finished sixth, ahead of Piastri and Lawson, with Colapinto and Lindblad completing the top ten. Norris's pole was his third of the season and the 19th Grand Prix pole of his career.

=== Qualifying classification ===
Pos.	No.	Driver	Constructor	Qualifying times			Final grid
Pos.	No.	Driver	Constructor	Q1	Q2	Q3	Final grid
1	1	(United Kingdom) Lando Norris	McLaren-Mercedes	1:33.469	1:32.873	1:31.824	1
2	12	(Italy) Kimi Antonelli	Mercedes	1:33.267	1:32.591	1:31.835	2
3	3	(Netherlands) Max Verstappen	Red Bull Racing-Red Bull Ford	1:33.381	1:32.431	1:31.964	3
4	44	(United Kingdom) Lewis Hamilton	Ferrari	1:33.531	1:32.710	1:32.013	4
5	16	(Monaco) Charles Leclerc	Ferrari	1:33.532	1:32.755	1:32.019	5
6	63	(United Kingdom) George Russell	Mercedes	1:33.211	1:32.850	1:32.149	6
7	81	(Australia) Oscar Piastri	McLaren-Mercedes	1:33.829	1:33.204	1:32.294	7
8	30	(New Zealand) Liam Lawson	Red Bull Racing-Red Bull Ford	1:33.310	1:32.780	1:32.316	8
9	43	(Argentina) Franco Colapinto	Alpine-Mercedes	1:33.963	1:33.038	1:32.903	9
10	41	(United Kingdom) Arvid Lindblad	Racing Bulls-Red Bull Ford	1:34.340	1:33.204	1:33.041	10
11	27	(Germany) Nico Hülkenberg	Audi	1:34.417	1:33.223	N/A	11
12	5	(Brazil) Gabriel Bortoleto	Audi	1:33.986	1:33.388	N/A	12
13	31	(France) Esteban Ocon	Haas-Ferrari	1:34.667	1:33.667	N/A	13
14	10	(France) Pierre Gasly	Alpine-Mercedes	1:34.246	1:33.753	N/A	14
15	22	(Japan) Yuki Tsunoda	Racing Bulls-Red Bull Ford	1:34.311	1:34.084	N/A	15
16	23	(Thailand) Alexander Albon	Atlassian Williams-Mercedes	1:35.307	1:35.532	N/A	16
17	55	(Spain) Carlos Sainz Jr.	Atlassian Williams-Mercedes	1:35.312	N/A	N/A	20^{a}
18	14	(Spain) Fernando Alonso	Aston Martin Aramco-Honda	1:35.388	N/A	N/A	17
19	11	(Mexico) Sergio Pérez	Cadillac-Ferrari	1:35.913	N/A	N/A	18
20	77	(Finland) Valtteri Bottas	Cadillac-Ferrari	1:38.011	N/A	N/A	19
107% time: 1:39.735
—	87	(United Kingdom) Oliver Bearman	Haas-Ferrari	No time	N/A	N/A	PL^{b}
—	18	(Canada) Lance Stroll	Aston Martin Aramco-Honda	No time	N/A	N/A	21^{c}

Notes

- ^a – Carlos Sainz Jr. received a three-place grid penalty for impeding Valtteri Bottas in Q1.
- ^b – Oliver Bearman did not take part in qualifying. He was allowed to race at the stewards' discretion, but was required to start from the pit lane as his car was modified under parc fermé conditions.
- ^c – Lance Stroll failed to set a time during qualifying. He was allowed to race at the stewards' discretion. He also received a 40-place grid penalty for exceeding his quota of power unit elements.

== Race ==
The race was held on 13 September 2026, at 15:00 local time (UTC+2), and was run for 57 laps.

=== Race report ===
==== Pre-race ====
Lando Norris (McLaren) started from pole position, with Kimi Antonelli (Mercedes) alongside him and Max Verstappen (Red Bull) and Lewis Hamilton (Ferrari) on the second row. Charles Leclerc (Ferrari) and George Russell (Mercedes) occupied the third row. Carlos Sainz Jr. (Williams) started 20th following a three-place penalty for impeding in qualifying. Lance Stroll (Aston Martin) was 21st after a power unit penalty, while Oliver Bearman (Haas) started from the pit lane following changes to his car and power unit components under parc fermé conditions.

The race began in hot, dry conditions. All three dry-weather tyre compounds were represented on the grid. Norris and Antonelli chose medium tyres, while Verstappen and Hamilton started on softs. Leclerc, Russell, Oscar Piastri (McLaren) and Liam Lawson (Red Bull) selected hards. Nico Hülkenberg (Audi) was the other soft-tyre starter. Franco Colapinto (Alpine) and Arvid Lindblad (Racing Bulls) joined the front-row starters on mediums, while most of the remaining field chose hards. Tyre graining and degradation were expected to influence the choice between one and two stop statergies.

==== Start and opening laps ====
Antonelli challenged Norris at the start taking the lead by cutting the first corner - Antonelli gave the position back to Norris. Antonelli then attempted another move at turns 5 and 6, again taking the position off-track and conceding the position back to Norris. Verstappen took advantage of the second incident to pass Antonelli at turn 7. Norris emerged from the opening exchanges ahead of Verstappen, Antonelli and Hamilton and began to pull away. Verstappen had also gone off the circuit during his opening-corner contest with Hamilton, but retained the position. Red Bull instructed Verstappen to drop behind Hamilton to avoid a possible penalty. With Antonelli between them, this required Verstappen to surrender two places. He complied on lap 4, dropping from second to fourth despite disputing the instruction over the radio. Hamilton was briefly third but soon began losing pace because of brake problems. Verstappen moved back into third, and Hamilton continued to fall through the field before retiring. Hamilton later described the brake pedal losing its normal response as he approached turn 5, followed by contact with a barrier and a further deterioration a few corners later.

Piastri's race was also compromised early on; contact with Russell damaged his front wing and cost him positions. Further back, Sainz and Yuki Tsunoda (Racing Bulls) made contact at turn 1. As the opening order settled, Colapinto ran ahead of Lawson, before Lawson overtook Colapinto at turn 5 on lap 10 to take sixth. Norris continued to extend his advantage over Antonelli, while Verstappen lost further ground in third. Leclerc and Russell followed, with Russell discussing a possible early stop to gain track position over the Ferrari. Antonelli had another excursion, and McLaren informed Norris that his rival was struggling more with his tyres. These developments allowed Norris to maintain control of the opening stint as the leading drivers considered their first stops. Sainz and Fernando Alonso (Aston Martin) subsequently collided while contesting 17th place. Alonso's front wing was damaged, and Sainz received a five-second time penalty.

==== Virtual safety car and first pit stops ====
Stroll stopped at turn 20 with a brake problem, prompting a virtual safety car period on lap 14. Mercedes used the opportunity to change the Antonelli's tyres with less time lost relative to cars circulating at the reduced speed, Norris was unable to do so, having already driven past the pit entry when the virtual safety car was deployed, Verstappen also stopped. Russell, Colapinto, Lindblad and Hülkenberg were among those who also stopped on that lap. Leclerc stayed out. The virtual safety car ended before Norris reached the pit entry on lap 15, so he had to make his stop with his rivals back at racing speed. A slow tyre change then kept him stationary for approximately seven seconds, compounding the time lost. Before the intervention, he had held a lead of around six seconds over Antonelli. Norris rejoined fifth, behind Leclerc, Antonelli, Verstappen and Russell. Leclerc inherited the lead without stopping, while Antonelli headed the drivers who had already changed tyres. Antonelli and Verstappen had changed to hard tyres, whereas Russell had replaced his starting hards with mediums. Antonelli initially drew closer to Leclerc before the gap widened again. During the middle stages, he reported an unusual feeling through the steering, although Mercedes told him that its data showed no apparent problem. Leclerc continued on his original tyres, with Verstappen, Russell and Norris following the leading pair.

==== Middle stages ====
Russell made his second stop at the end of lap 28, returning to hard tyres and releasing Norris into fourth. Russell rejoined behind Lawson and began closing. He regained fifth after Lawson ran deep at the chicane, but remained well behind the leading group. Norris used the clear track to reduce his deficit to Verstappen. By the final ten laps, he was within a second of the Red Bull, bringing Norris back into contention for a podium position. Sergio Pérez (Cadillac) retired during the middle stages with a suspected problem with the car's water system. His withdrawal followed those of Hamilton and Stroll, while Leclerc remained in the lead on his starting set of hard tyres. Piastri continued his opening stint until lap 42, while Lawson stayed out until lap 44. Their delayed stops contrasted with those of the drivers who had changed tyres during the early virtual safety car. Piastri continued with the damaged front wing, and McLaren adjusted it during his stop rather than replacing it. He rejoined behind Lindblad and subsequently passed him at turn 1.

McLaren's attempt to undercut Piastri ahead of Lawson was unsuccessfull. Piastri also became involved in the contest between Gabriel Bortoleto (Audi) and Colapinto, where the Colapinto attempted a move at the turn 5 chicane. The close running produced further pressure for positions but did not allow Piastri to move ahead of Colapinto. Sainz was subsequently called into the pits to retire. Leclerc remained at the head of the field, while Norris continued closing on Verstappen behind Antonelli. Ferrari extended Leclerc's opening stint in the hope that another safety car intervention would reduce the cost of his pit stop. Antonelli remained behind him, with the gap varying as he managed his tyres. No further caution arrived to assist Ferrari. As the race approached its closing stages, Verstappen and Norris joined the leading battle, but Leclerc still needed to change tyres.

==== Closing stages and finish ====
Bortoleto made his stop on lap 47, followed by Leclerc at the end of lap 48. Leclerc fitted soft tyres and rejoined in fourth, ahead of Russell and behind the three drivers contesting victory. Antonelli now held the outright lead from Verstappen and Norris. His advantage was initially small, with the first three separated by less than two seconds, before he increased the gap once released into clear track. Verstappen was left defending second from Norris, whose recovery had brought him back to the Red Bull without providing a clear opportunity to pass. Bortoleto received a warning for moving under braking during the midfield contest.

On the penultimate lap, Verstappen encountered lapped traffic and cut the turn 5 chicane. Norris challenged him and argued that the Red Bull had gained an advantage by leaving the track. The incident was reviewed without further action, and Verstappen kept second. Despite remaining close in the final stages, Norris was unable to complete a pass. Pierre Gasly (Alpine) had extended his original hard-tyre stint in the hope of a late neutralisation, before make a pit stop under green-flag conditions. His late visit to the pits removed him from the points. Colapinto, who had changed from mediums to hards during the early virtual safety car, finished seventh, ahead of Piastri. Lindblad and Hülkenberg completed the points scorers, while Esteban Ocon (Haas) finished just outside the top ten. Antonelli won the race ahead of Verstappen. Norris was third and Leclerc held fourth over Russell, with Lawson sixth. Gasly was classified 12th and received a five-second penalty for speeding in the pit lane. Bortoleto, Tsunoda, Alexander Albon (Williams), Bearman, Alonso and Valtteri Bottas (Cadillac) were the remaining finishers. Sainz, Pérez, Stroll and Hamilton retired.

==== Post-race ====
Antonelli acknowledged afterwards that Norris had deserved to win and that the circumstances made his own victory less satisfying. He nevertheless highlighted Mercedes' pace on the hard tyres and stressed that he intended to approach the remaining races individually rather than regard the championship as decided. The result was his eighth Grand Prix victory of the season. Norris attributed the result to the unfortunate timing of the virtual safety car, observing that his early speed had put him beyond the pit entry when the intervention began. He believed McLaren should have won. The circuit's limited overtaking opportunities also drew criticism from drivers following its first Grand Prix. Following the race's conclusion, Antonelli extended his championship lead over Russell to 81 points and his advantage over Norris to 106. Mercedes moved to 503 points in the Constructors' Championship, ahead of Ferrari on 358.

=== Race classification ===
Pos.	No.	Driver	Constructor	Laps	Time/Retired	Grid	Points
1	12	(Italy) Kimi Antonelli	Mercedes	57	1:34:23.754	2	25
2	3	(Netherlands) Max Verstappen	Red Bull Racing-Red Bull Ford	57	+4.351	3	18
3	1	(United Kingdom) Lando Norris	McLaren-Mercedes	57	+5.089	1	15
4	16	(Monaco) Charles Leclerc	Ferrari	57	+29.116	5	12
5	63	(United Kingdom) George Russell	Mercedes	57	+29.829	6	10
6	30	(New Zealand) Liam Lawson	Red Bull Racing-Red Bull Ford	57	+1:26.746	8	8
7	43	(Argentina) Franco Colapinto	Alpine-Mercedes	57	+1:34.281	9	6
8	81	(Australia) Oscar Piastri	McLaren-Mercedes	57	+1:35.839	7	4
9	41	(United Kingdom) Arvid Lindblad	Racing Bulls-Red Bull Ford	56	+1 lap	10	2
10	27	(Germany) Nico Hülkenberg	Audi	56	+1 lap	11	1
11	31	(France) Esteban Ocon	Haas-Ferrari	56	+1 lap	13	
12	10	(France) Pierre Gasly	Alpine-Mercedes	56	+1 lap^{a}	14	
13	5	(Brazil) Gabriel Bortoleto	Audi	56	+1 lap	12	
14	22	(Japan) Yuki Tsunoda	Racing Bulls-Red Bull Ford	56	+1 lap	15	
15	23	(Thailand) Alexander Albon	Atlassian Williams-Mercedes	56	+1 lap	16	
16	87	(United Kingdom) Oliver Bearman	Haas-Ferrari	56	+1 lap	PL	
17	14	(Spain) Fernando Alonso	Aston Martin Aramco-Honda	55	+2 laps	17	
18	77	(Finland) Valtteri Bottas	Cadillac-Ferrari	54	+3 laps	19	
Ret	55	(Spain) Carlos Sainz Jr.	Atlassian Williams-Mercedes	43	Collision damage	20	
Ret	11	(Mexico) Sergio Pérez	Cadillac-Ferrari	31	Water pressure	18	
Ret	18	(Canada) Lance Stroll	Aston Martin Aramco-Honda	12	Brakes	21	
Ret	44	(United Kingdom) Lewis Hamilton	Ferrari	6	Brakes	4	

Notes

- ^a – Pierre Gasly received a five-second time penalty for speeding in the pit lane. His final position was not affected by the penalty.

== Championship standings after the race ==
Drivers' Championship standings

Pos.	Driver	Points
1	(Italy) Kimi Antonelli	292
2	(United Kingdom) George Russell	211
3	(United Kingdom) Lewis Hamilton	191
4	(United Kingdom) Lando Norris	186
5	(Monaco) Charles Leclerc	167

Constructors' Championship standings

Pos.	Constructor	Points
1	(Germany) Mercedes	503
2	(Italy) Ferrari	358
3	(United Kingdom) McLaren-Mercedes	306
4	(Austria) Red Bull Racing-Red Bull Ford	230
5	(Italy) Racing Bulls-Red Bull Ford	77

- Note: Only the top five positions are included for both sets of standings.

== See also ==
- 2026 Madrid Formula 2 round

Previous race: 2026 Italian Grand Prix	FIA Formula One World Championship; 2026 season	Next race: 2026 Azerbaijan Grand Prix
Previous race: 2025 Spanish Grand Prix	Spanish Grand Prix	Next race: 2027 Spanish Grand Prix
