= Motortec =

Motortec is an international trade fair of automotive components and accessories originally only held biennially (on odd years) in Madrid, at the IFEMA exhibition centre. The 2007 edition, held in May, boasted 804 exhibitors from 24 countries. The 2009 edition took place in March.

Until 2020, it was known as Motortec Automechanika Madrid. The collaboration with Messe Frankfurt was not renewed.

The 16th Motortec Madrid took place from 20 to 23 April 2022. 500 exhibitors presented their products and services. Over 52,000 visitors came to the show.

It has now been exported to Chile starting in 2022. The first Motortec Chile took place from 6 to 8 October 2022. Over 35 exhibitors and 80 brands presented their products and services. Over 3,000 visitors came to the show.

== See also ==
- Automechanika
