= IFEMA =

Spanish commercial fair organiser

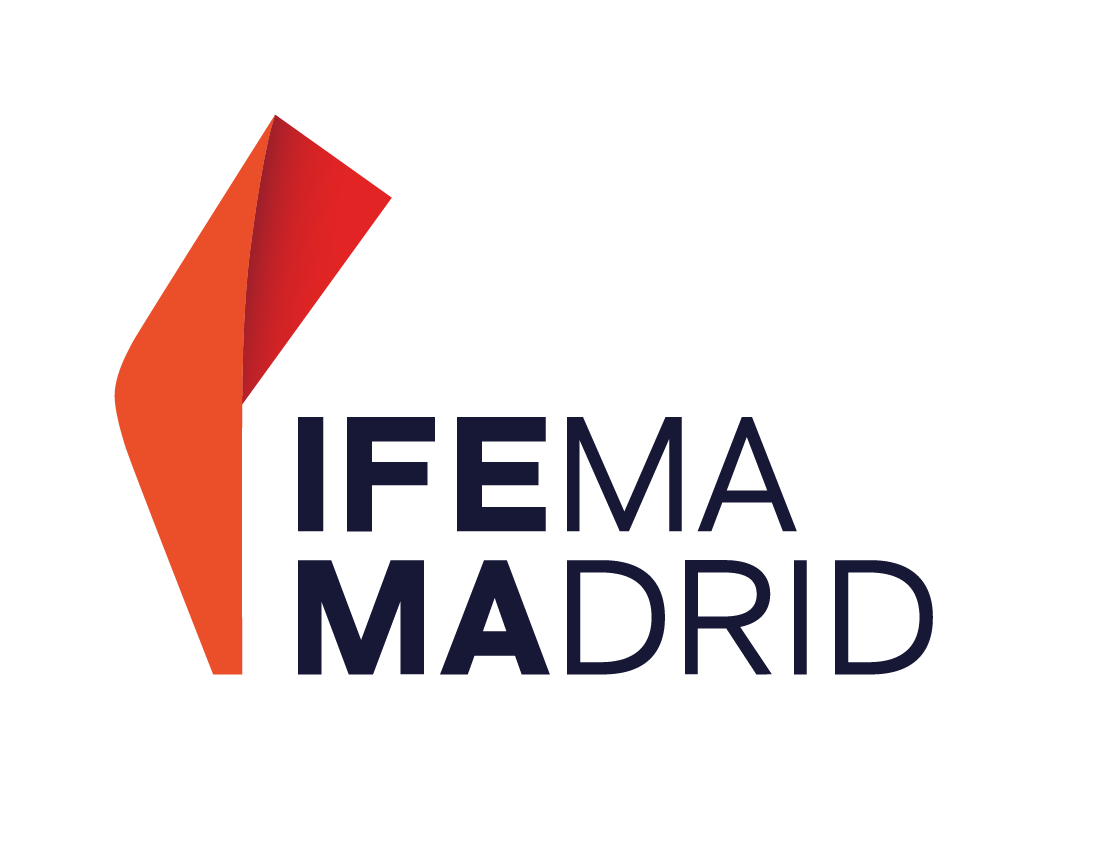

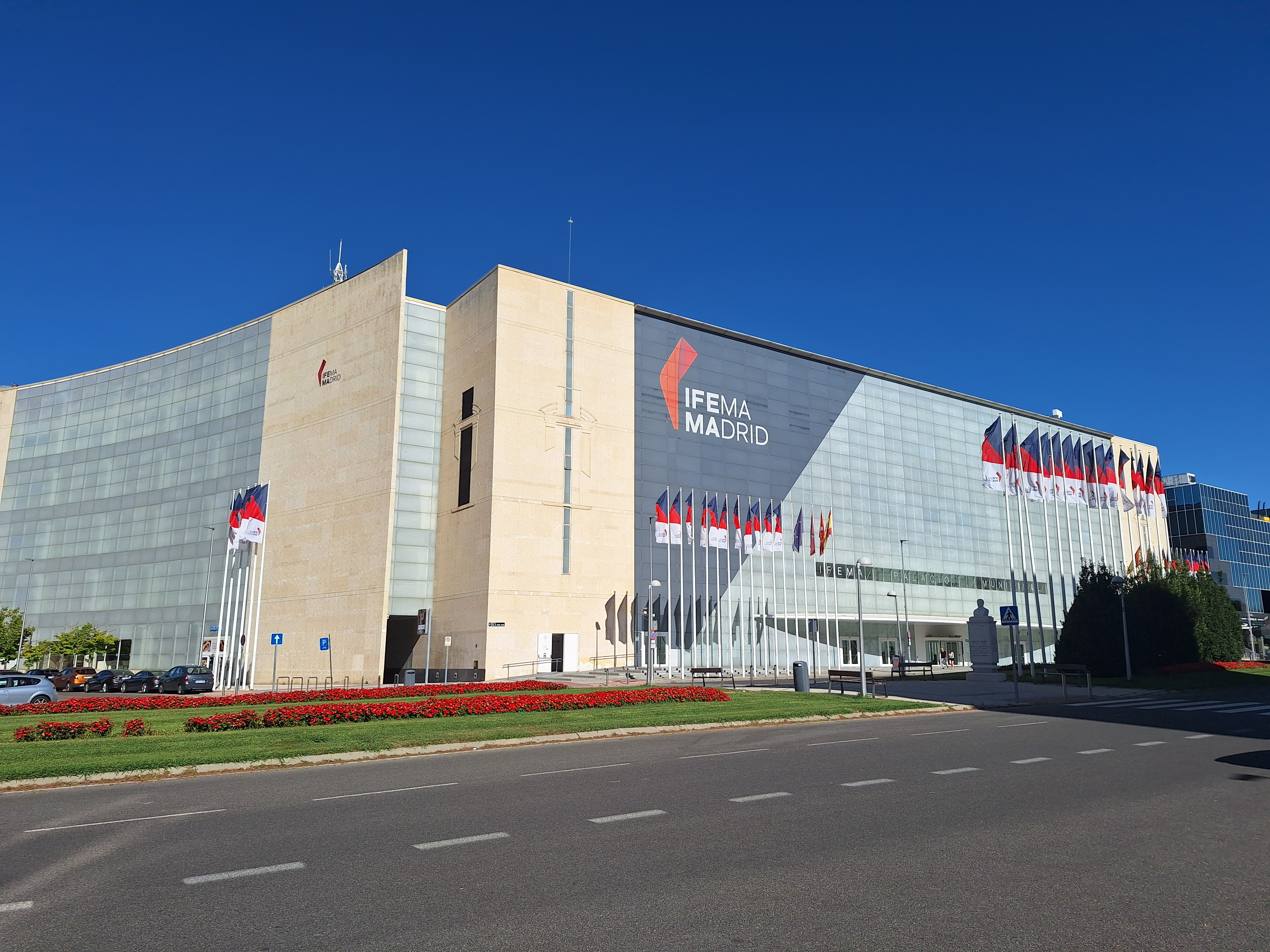
- Formation: 1980
- Type: fair institution
- Legal status: consortium
- Headquarters: IFEMA Exhibition Centre
- Location: Madrid, Spain

IFEMA (short for Institución Ferial de Madrid; Spanish: Fair Institution of Madrid) is an entity charged with the organisation of fairs, halls and congresses in their facilities in Madrid.

It is a consortium partnered by the Ayuntamiento de Madrid (31 %), the regional administration of the Community of Madrid (31 %), the Madrid Chamber of Commerce and Industry (31 %) and the Montemadrid Foundation.

The first fair organised by Ifema took place in 1980. Until then Madrid did not celebrate fairs, as it was a privilege reserved to cities such as Valencia or Barcelona. Initially IFEMA had facilities in the Paseo de la Castellana and the Casa de Campo, but as it grew bigger, new facilities were opened in the Campo de las Naciones near the Barajas Airport in 1991.

FITUR, SIMO, MOTORTEC, ARCO and the Madrid Fashion Week are some of the fairs organised by IFEMA. The facilities of IFEMA also served as the venue of COP25 and the 2022 NATO Summit. In March 2020, some halls of the Campo de las Naciones facilities were repurposed to serve as a 5,000 bed field hospital during the COVID-19 pandemic.
