= IFEMA Exhibition Centre =

Trade fair facility in Madrid, Spain

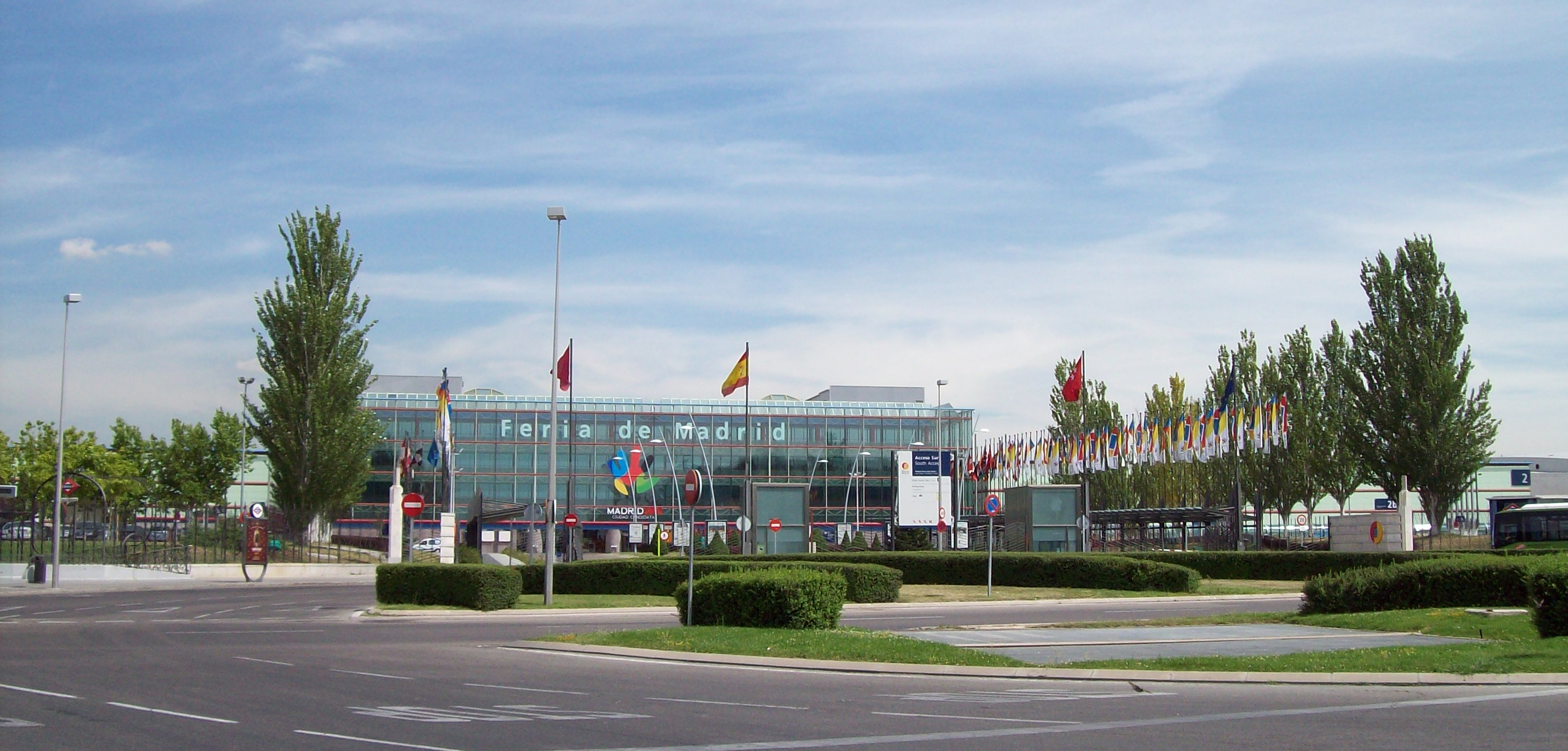
- Entrance to IFEMA
- Interactive map of IFEMA Exhibition Centre
- Location: Barajas, Madrid, Spain
- Coordinates: 40°28′04″N 3°37′02″W
- Owner: IFEMA
- Public transit: Feria de Madrid; Madrid Bus

Construction
- Built: 1980–
- Opened: 1980

Website
- www.ifema.es

The IFEMA Trade Fair Centre or Juan Carlos I Trade Fair Centre (Spanish: Recinto ferial de IFEMA) is a permanent trade fair facility in the Barajas district of Madrid, Spain. It is operated by Spanish commercial fair organiser IFEMA.

The building has 200,000 m^{2} of covered exhibition space distributed across twelve pavilions, a convention center of more than 10,000 m^{2}, and the necessary spaces and facilities for the optimal development of the activities held there, such as a meeting area, an auditorium for 600 attendees, numerous restaurants, and 14,000 parking spaces.

== History ==
It began operating in 1980. For a time, IFEMA-organized events were held in the pavilions of the Casa de Campo peri-urban park. In 1991, King Juan Carlos inaugurated a new fairground in a developing area called Campo de las Naciones. Over time, pavilions were added to the complex. In the same Campo de las Naciones, next to the fairgrounds, is the Municipal Congress Palace, formerly managed by municipal company Madridec (acronym for Madrid Espacios y Congresos), which also managed other event spaces in the city. Madridec went bankrupt in 2013, dissolving as a company, with its assets and debts transferring directly to the City Council.

== Other uses ==
Following the Spanair accident, which occurred on August 20, 2008, a makeshift funeral home was set up in pavilion number six of the IFEMA exhibition center, where the bodies of the deceased were taken.

In response to the COVID-19 pandemic, the joint construction of a IFEMA Hospital was announced on March 20, 2020, by the Community of Madrid administration, the Ministry of Health, and the Military Emergency Unit, with a maximum capacity of 5,000 beds and another 500 in the Intensive Care Unit. Pavilion 14 had previously been converted into a shelter to accommodate homeless people during the pandemic. Two days later the first patients began to arrive, and by March 28 there were already 581. By this date, pavilions 5 and 9 were operational, 7 would be soon, and 1 and 3 are reserved in case they are needed. Pavilion 10 is used as a warehouse.
