= Melbourne Formula 2 round =

(Australia) Melbourne Formula 2 round

FIA Formula 2 Championship
- Venue: Albert Park Circuit
- Location: Melbourne, Victoria, Australia
- First race: 2023
- Most wins (driver): (Paraguay) Joshua Dürksen (2)
- Most wins (team): (Spain) Campos Racing (2)
- Lap record: 1:30.712 ( (Denmark) Frederik Vesti, Prema Racing, Dallara F2 2018, 2023)

The Melbourne Formula 2 round is a FIA Formula 2 Championship series race that is run on the Albert Park Circuit in Melbourne, Victoria, Australia.

== Winners ==
Year	Race	Driver	Team	Report
2023	Sprint	(Norway) Dennis Hauger	MP Motorsport	Report
2023	Feature	(Japan) Ayumu Iwasa	DAMS	Report
2024	Sprint	(Czech Republic) Roman Staněk	Trident	Report
2024	Feature	(France) Isack Hadjar	Campos Racing	Report
2025	Sprint	(Paraguay) Joshua Dürksen	AIX Racing	Report
2025	Feature	Race cancelled due to adverse weather conditions.		Report
2026	Sprint	(Paraguay) Joshua Dürksen	Invicta Racing	Report
2026	Feature	(Bulgaria) Nikola Tsolov	Campos Racing	Report

== See also ==
- Australian Grand Prix
