= Dallara F2 cars =

Racing car model

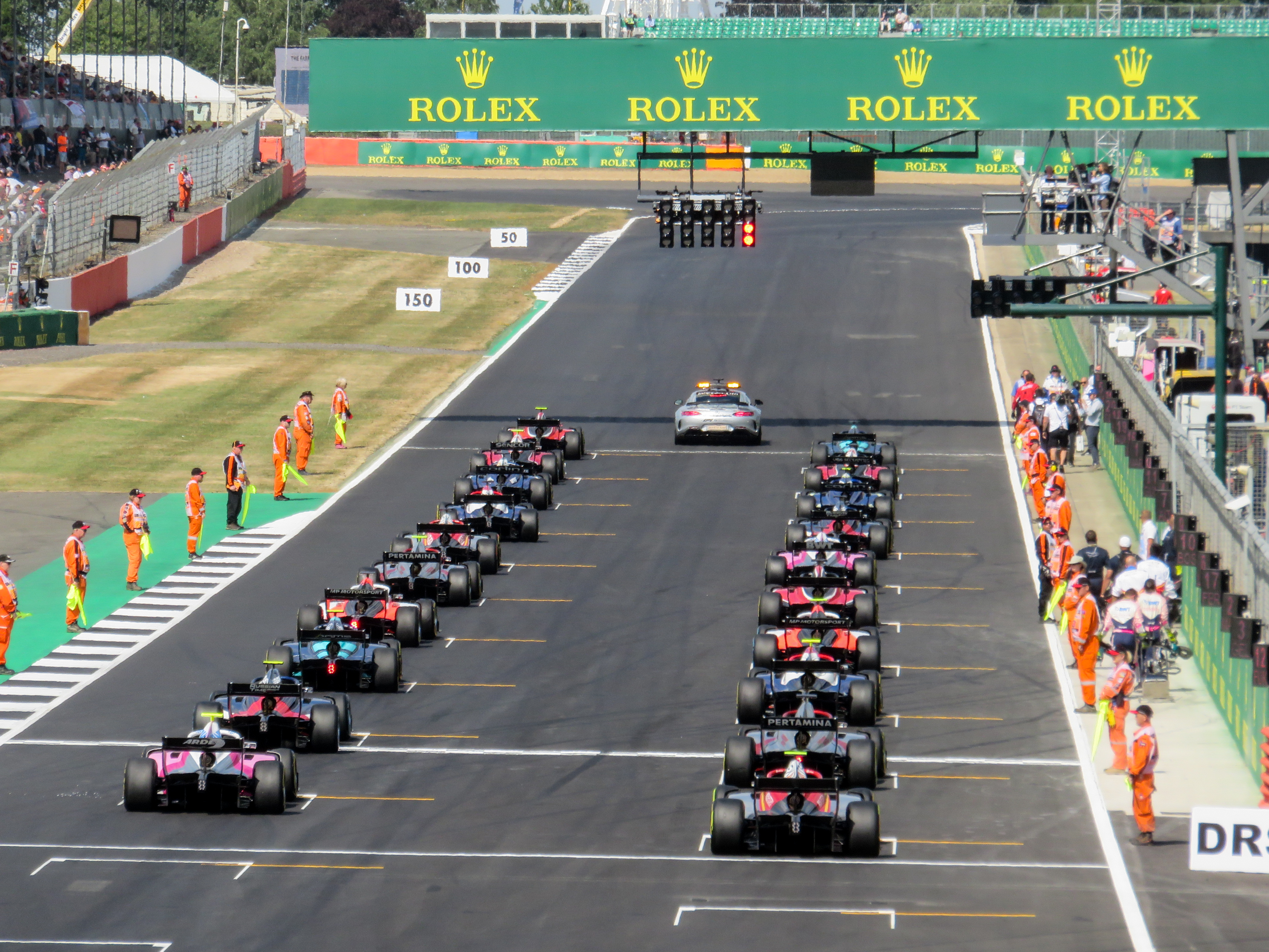
A field of Dallara F2 2018 race cars in the 2018 Silverstone Formula 2 round.

The Dallara F2 cars are a set of racing cars developed by Italian manufacturer Dallara for use in the FIA Formula 2 Championship, a feeder series for Formula One. The F2 cars succeed the Dallara GP2 cars as Dallara's latest set of Formula Two class open-wheel cars.

Throughout each generation, much of the Dallara F2 chassis platform has remained the same for the purposes of cost, while also receiving safety reinforcements and accessibility updates.

== F2 2018 ==
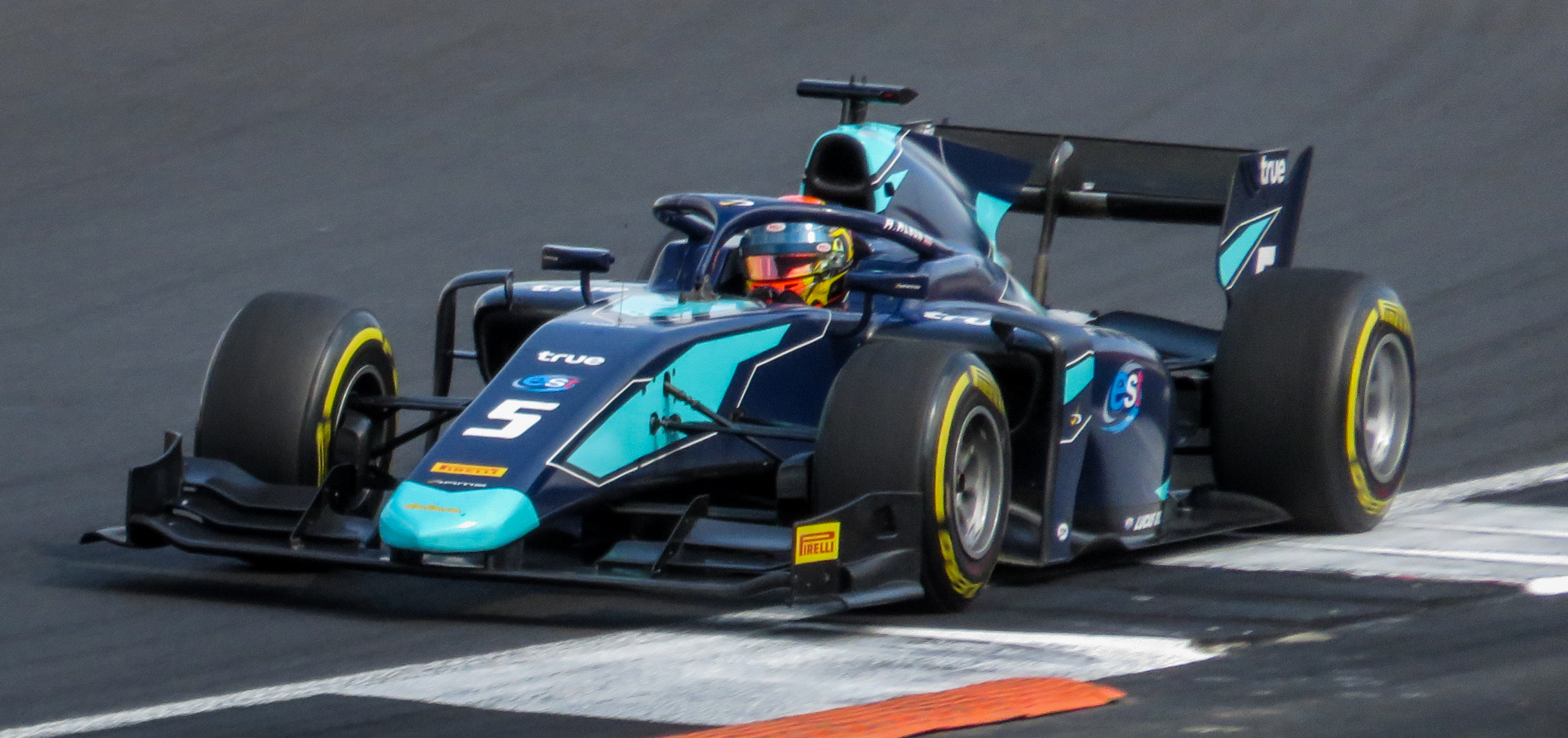
Alex Albon driving an F2 2018 in the 2018 Silverstone Formula 2 round.

The Dallara F2 2018 (originally known as the Dallara F2/18) was the second car used by the FIA Formula 2 Championship and was introduced for 2018 as a replacement for the aging Dallara GP2/11 chassis. The F2 2018 was Dallara's first ever turbo-powered Formula 2 car, the first turbo-powered Formula One junior feeder-series car since the Dallara GP3/10 in the GP3 Series, and the first to fully integrate the halo.

The car quickly gained a reputation among the series' drivers as being difficult to drive. The new Mecachrome V6 engine required a more delicate touch on the throttle than the GP2/11, causing drivers to stall numerous times in several race weekends. It was also prone to reliability issues, which in some cases prevented drivers from starting races altogether. Series organiser Bruno Michel acknowledged that the car had too many problems at its launch, but argued that the introduction of the F2 2018 was necessary in light of the obsolete GP2/11 chassis, a view shared by team principals.

It is also the only Dallara GP2/F2 chassis to suffer a fatality to date; a crash at Eau Rouge during the 2019 Spa-Francorchamps feature race killed Anthoine Hubert and critically injured Juan Manuel Correa.

The F2 2018 was active for six seasons. George Russell, Nyck de Vries, Mick Schumacher, Oscar Piastri, Felipe Drugovich, and Théo Pourchaire won the championship with the F2 2018 chassis.

== F2 2024 ==
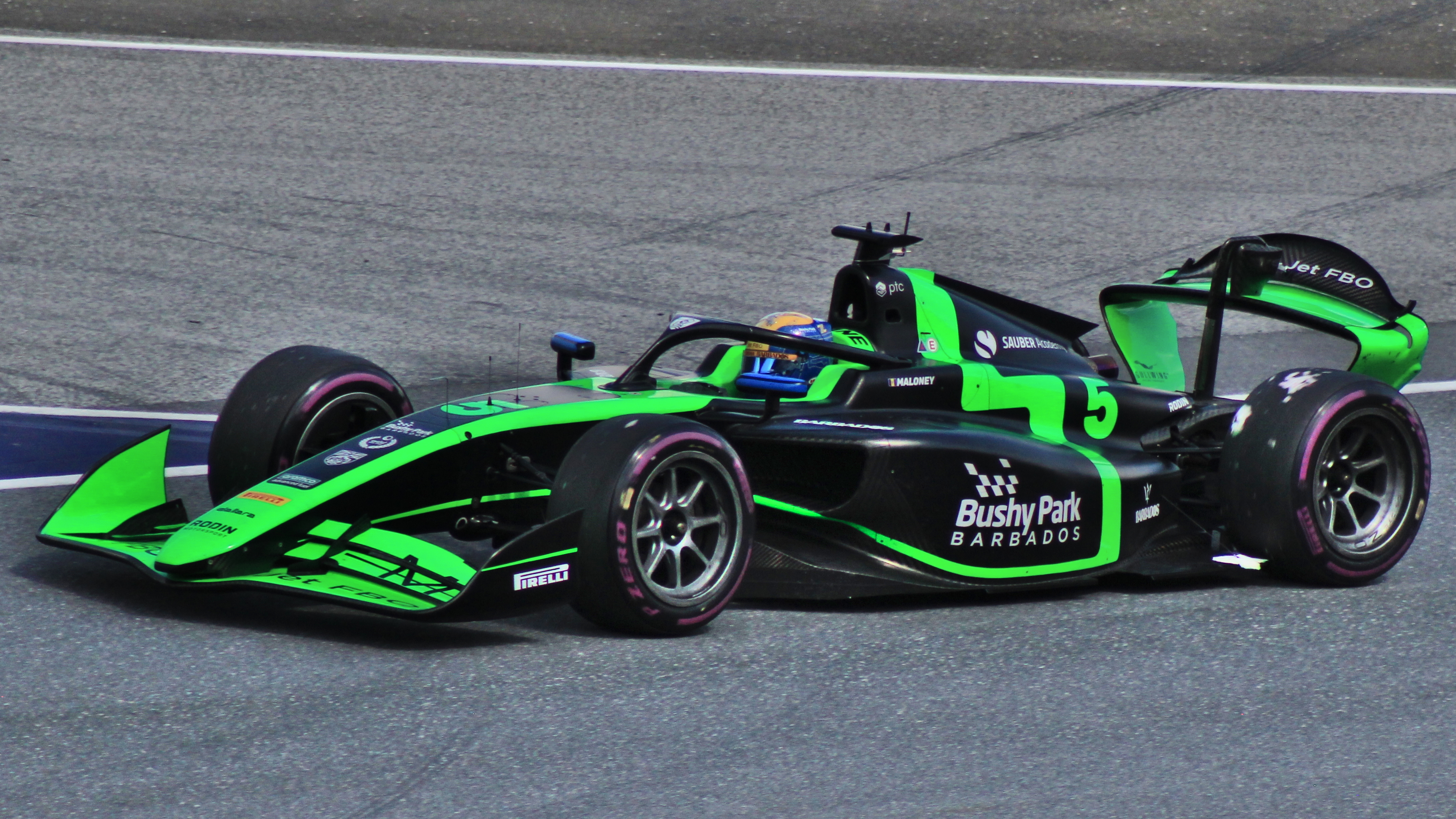
Zane Maloney driving an F2 2024 in the 2024 Spielberg Formula 2 round.

The Dallara F2 2024 was unveiled in 2023 for the 2024 Formula 2 Championship, featuring an updated design based on the 2022 Formula One technical regulations. The new car would implement similar concepts to the new rule set, including the use of ground effect to help produce closer racing and better prepare junior drivers for Formula One machinery. This also forced teams to approach setup differently.

While it carried over most of the F2 2018's parts, it also saw an extensive rework with a focus towards increased safety, ergonomics, and accessibility. The F2 2024 featured updates to the platform's nose, survival cell, and roll hoop to withstand higher forces in crashes. The cockpit was revised to fit drivers of any stature, and the suspension geometry was updated to require less effort to steer the car. The F2 2024 retained the previous car's Mecachrome V6 engine, continuing to use 55% sustainable fuel from Saudi Aramco.

The F2 2024 has been active for three seasons, so far. Gabriel Bortoleto and Leonardo Fornaroli have won the championship with the F2 2024 chassis.

== F2 2027 ==
On 5 September 2026, Dallara unveiled the Dallara F2 2027 with a design based on the 2026 Formula One technical regulations. It is set to debut in the 2027 FIA Formula 2 Championship.

The F2 2027 retains the outgoing car's accessibility features and builds on its electronic systems, including the gearbox, which now includes an onboard starter. It retains the same Mecachrome V6 engine used by its predecessors.

== See also ==
- FIA Formula 2 Championship
