= FIA Formula 2 Championship =

Single-seater racing championship

- Category: One-make Open-wheel single-seater Formula auto racing
- Region: International
- Inaugural season: 2017
- Drivers: 22
- Teams: 11
- Chassis suppliers: Dallara
- Engine suppliers: Mecachrome
- Tyre suppliers: Pirelli
- Drivers' champion: (Italy) Leonardo Fornaroli (2025) (Invicta Racing)
- Teams' champion: (United Kingdom) Invicta Racing (2025)
- Most titles: Teams; (Italy) Prema Racing (United Kingdom) Invicta Racing (both 2 titles)
- Official website: fiaformula2.com

The FIA Formula 2 Championship (F2) is a second tier single-seater championship organised by the Fédération Internationale de l'Automobile. The championship was introduced in 2017, following the rebranding of the long-term Formula One feeder series GP2. The series original founders were Flavio Briatore and current managing director Bruno Michel. Although it is not necessary, most current F1 drivers have previously participated in Formula 2 or GP2 before graduating to Formula One. It is the final step on the FIA Global Pathway driver development ladder.

Formula 2 is designed to create an ideal training ground for life in Formula One, and to this effect, it makes racing relatively affordable for the teams. As a spec series, all teams are required to use the same chassis (designed by Italian manufacturer Dallara), engine, and tyre supplier. These are designed to mirror Formula One cars in terms of safety, aesthetics, system functionalities, performance, sustainability, and cost-effectiveness. Formula 2 mainly races on European and Middle-Eastern circuits, but has made appearances at other international race tracks such as the Albert Park Circuit in Australia, the Miami International Autodrome in the USA, and the Circuit Gilles Villeneuve in Canada.

== History ==
=== Origin and first season ===
In 2015, the FIA announced plans to revive the Formula Two category, following the continued success of GP2 and Formula Renault 3.5. This decision came despite the discontinuation of the FIA Formula Two Championship only three years prior, owing to a lack of entries in its final season. On 8 March 2017, the FIA confirmed that the GP2 Series would be rebranded as the FIA Formula 2 Championship after an agreement with Liberty Media, which had acquired both the series and the Formula One Group earlier that year. FIA President at the time, Jean Todt, stated that "rationalising the pathway to Formula One has been a major goal of the FIA in my time here."

The 2017 Formula 2 Championship comprised eleven rounds, ten of which supported the Formula One World Championship, with an additional stand-alone event at the Circuito de Jerez. The series retained the Dallara GP2/11 chassis, in use since 2011, and the Mecachrome V8108 GP2 V8, first introduced in 2005. Rookie and reigning GP3 Series champion Charles Leclerc won the Drivers' Championship, while Russian Time secured the Teams' Championship and they were the last to lift a trophy with the Dallara GP2/11.

=== 2018–2020 ===
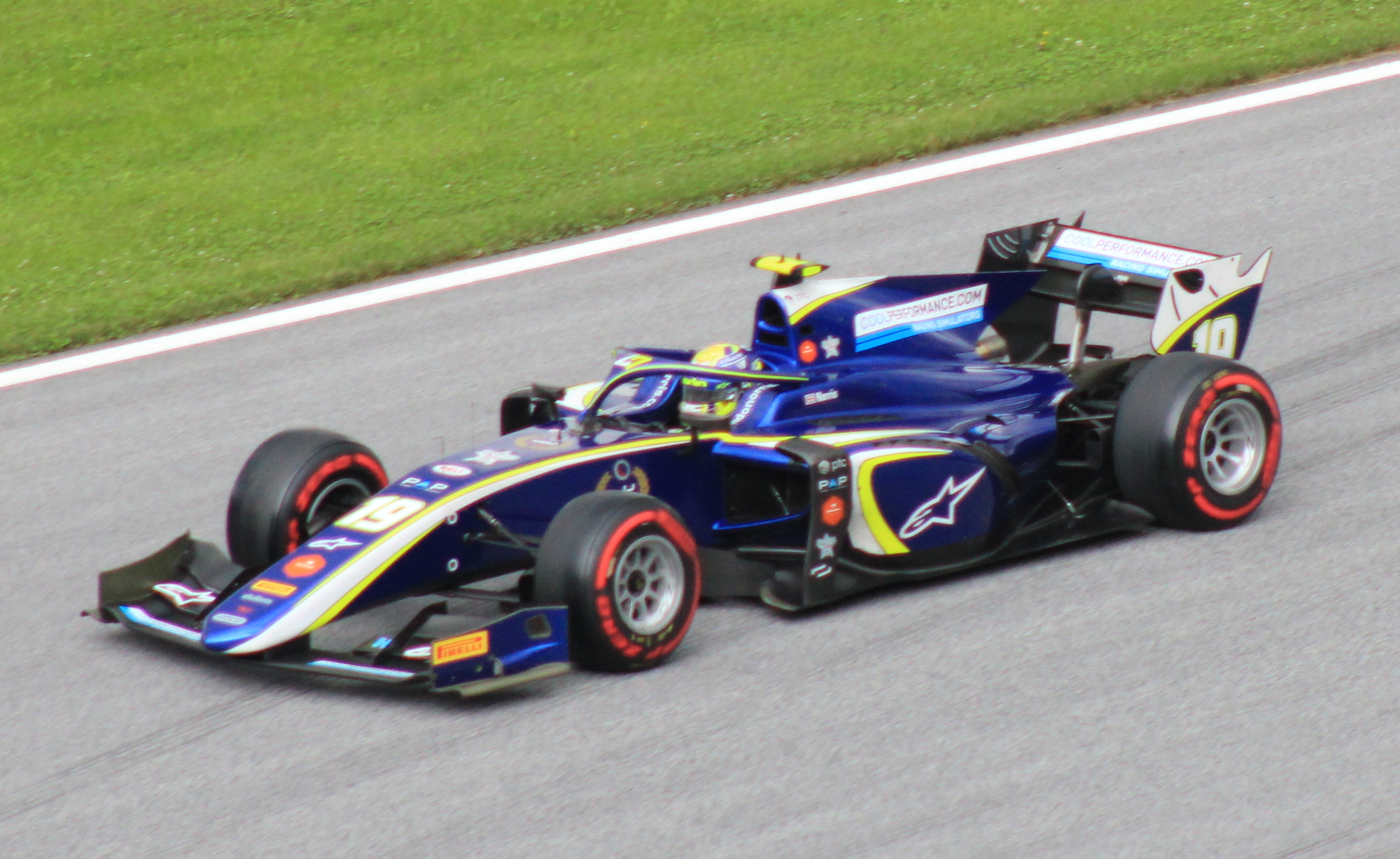
The Dallara F2 2018 added a halo crash-protection device around the head of drivers.

The 2018 season introduced a new car, the Dallara F2 2018, featuring the Mecachrome V634 engine and the halo driver crash-protection device, which was also adopted by Formula One that year. Circuit Paul Ricard and the Sochi Autodrom were added to the calendar, while the Circuito de Jerez was removed. Carlin returned to the series after a one-year absence, and Charouz Racing System joined following the discontinuation of World Series Formula V8 3.5. Soon after the season concluded, Russian Time was sold to Virtuosi Racing, which had been operating the team since 2015.

The 2019 season witnessed the first fatality of a driver competing in the second tier of FIA-sanctioned formula racing in 10 years when French driver Anthoine Hubert was killed during the feature race at Spa-Francorchamps. The race was red-flagged and subsequently cancelled, along with the following day's sprint race. Later that year, the FIA introduced the Anthoine Hubert Award in his memory, recognising the highest-placed rookie in the standings. Zhou Guanyu became the inaugural recipient of the same.

The 2020 season was heavily disrupted by the COVID-19 pandemic, resulting in significant postponements, cancellations, and schedule revisions. The season eventually began in July and included an appearance at the Mugello Circuit for the first, and only time.

=== 2021–2023 ===
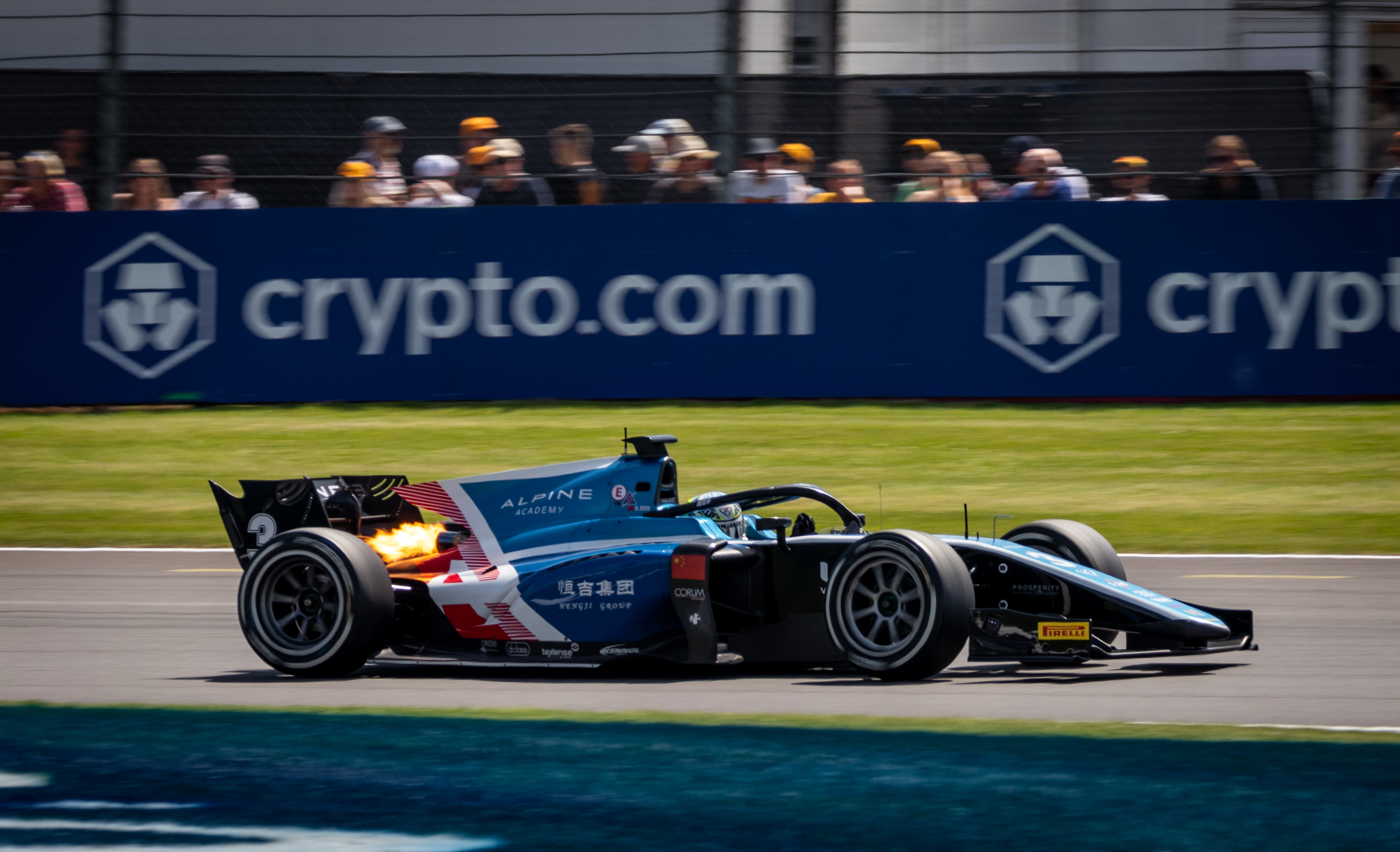
The 2021 season saw numerous changes to the championship's format in an effort to cut costs, including the removal of numerous circuits that FIA Formula 3 raced on.

The 2021 season underwent major restructuring as part of post-pandemic cost-cutting measures. Each round featured three races instead of two, while the number of circuits was reduced from twelve to eight. The Dallara F2 2018 chassis remained in use, despite plans for its replacement that year. The calendar was separated from that of the FIA Formula 3 Championship, meaning the two series no longer ran on the same Grand Prix weekends. (Note: The final round of the 2021 FIA Formula 3 Championship, was initially set to take place at the Circuit of the Americas before moving to the Sochi Autodrom.) As a result, the Red Bull Ring, Hungaroring, Circuit de Barcelona-Catalunya, Circuit Paul Ricard, and Circuit de Spa-Francorchamps were no longer included on the calendar, while the Jeddah Corniche Circuit was added to the schedule.

The 2022 championship marked a return to the pre-2021 format of two races per round, (Note: The two-race format was altered; the sprint race now took place before the feature race with its starting grid based on the reversal of the top ten in qualifying.) alongside a reduction in points awarded for sprint races, pole positions, and fastest laps. The calendar expanded to twenty-eight races across fourteen rounds. Circuits dropped in 2021 returned to the schedule, alongside the addition of two venues—Imola Circuit and Circuit Zandvoort. The round at Sochi Autodrom was cancelled following the Russian invasion of Ukraine. In 2023, Formula 2 raced at the Albert Park Circuit for the first time. Although Imola was initially scheduled, the round was cancelled due to severe flooding in the area.

=== 2024–present ===
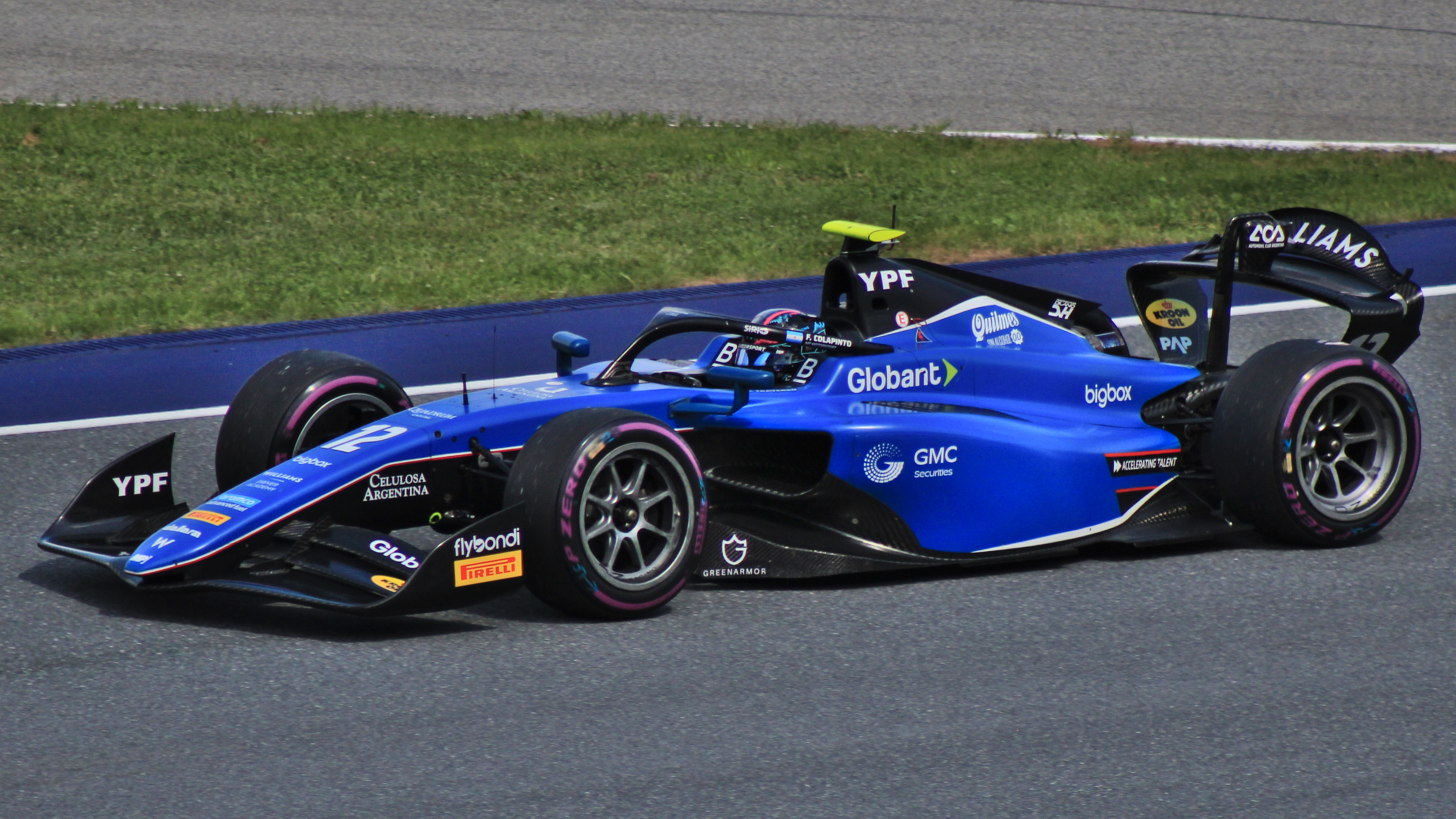
The Dallara F2 2024 was introduced to better accommodate female drivers and better resemble the 2022 Formula One regulation cycle.

A new chassis—the Dallara F2 2024—was introduced in 2024. Designed to more closely resemble the current generation of Formula One cars, it incorporated advanced safety technologies and was engineered to better accommodate female drivers. The series also made its debut at the Lusail International Circuit, which replaced the round at Zandvoort on the calendar.

The Imola Circuit was removed from the calendar following 2025 and will be replaced by the Madring from 2026 onwards.

== Race weekend ==
A Formula 2 race weekend is structured over three days. It typically begins on Friday with a 45-minute practice session followed by a 30-minute qualifying session. The first race, known as the sprint race, is held on Saturday. Its grid is formed by reversing the top ten positions from qualifying, and the race is run over a distance of approximately 120 km (75 mi) (Note: The Monte Carlo Formula 2 round is run for 100 km (62 mi) instead.) or a maximum duration of 45 minutes, whichever is reached first. The weekend concludes on Sunday with the feature race, traditionally the main event, which precedes the Formula 1 Grand Prix. This race covers around 170 km (110 mi) (Note: The Monte Carlo Formula 2 round is run to 140 km (87 mi) kilometres and the Budapest Formula 2 round is run to 160 km (99 mi) kilometres instead.) or lasts up to one hour, depending on which limit is reached first. Between 2017 and 2020, the feature race was scheduled on Saturdays, with the sprint race moved to Sundays.

=== Points system ===
The top 8 finishers in the sprint race receive the following points:

Point system for Sprint Race
1st	2nd	3rd	4th	5th	6th	7th	8th
10	8	6	5	4	3	2	1

The top 10 finishers in the Feature Race receive the following points:

Point system for Feature Race
1st	2nd	3rd	4th	5th	6th	7th	8th	9th	10th
25	18	15	12	10	8	6	4	2	1

The driver who secures pole position in Friday's qualifying session is awarded two additional championship points. In both the sprint and feature races, one point is granted for the fastest lap, provided the driver finishes within the top ten of the final classification. The maximum number of points achievable by a single driver in one round is 39.

In the event that two or more drivers finish the season with an equal number of points, a countback system is applied to determine their standings. Priority is given to the driver with the greater number of race victories. If still tied, the number of second-place finishes is compared, followed by third-place finishes, and so forth, until the tie is resolved. This procedure applies at all stages of the championship.

== Drivers ==
=== Numbering System ===
The FIA Formula 2 Championship allocates car numbers based on the results of the previous season's team standings, following a system similar to that used in Formula One between 1996 and 2013. Numbers are assigned sequentially, with the exception of number 13, which has remained unused since the introduction of the GP2 Series in 2005. In tribute to Anthoine Hubert, who suffered fatal injuries in Spa-Francorchamps in 2019, the number 19 was permanently retired ahead of the 2020 season. The following year, the number 18 was also withdrawn in his memory.

=== Drivers graduated to F1 ===
Since its rebranding in 2017, Formula 2 has established itself as the principal feeder series to Formula One, with many of its drivers progressing directly to the top tier of motorsport. Charles Leclerc and Sergey Sirotkin were the first graduate from the series to F1 following their debuts with Sauber and Williams in 2018, respectively. Leclerc entered Formula One as the reigning Formula 2 champion, while Sirotkin had made a one-round appearance in the inaugural F2 season as a reserve driver and had previously competed in GP2, finishing third in both the 2015 and 2016 standings. In 2019, the three leading drivers from the 2018 season graduated to Formula One: champion George Russell, runner-up Lando Norris, and third-place finisher Alex Albon, who debuted with Williams, McLaren, and Scuderia Toro Rosso, respectively. The following year, 2019 runner-up Nicholas Latifi joined Williams as the only full-time newcomer from Formula 2, while Jack Aitken, who finished fifth in the 2019 standings, made a single appearance at the Sakhir Grand Prix as Williams' reserve driver.

The 2021 Formula One grid featured three graduates from the 2020 season: champion Mick Schumacher and fifth-placed Nikita Mazepin joined Haas, while third-placed Yuki Tsunoda debuted with AlphaTauri. Zhou Guanyu, who finished third in the 2021 Formula 2 Championship standings, was the only full-time graduate in 2022, signing with Alfa Romeo. That season also saw the debut of 2019 champion Nyck de Vries, who substituted for Williams at the Italian Grand Prix. De Vries had since raced in the FIA World Endurance Championship and Formula E, where he won the 2021 title, before joining AlphaTauri full-time the next year. In 2023, two more former F2 drivers made their Formula One debuts: Oscar Piastri, 2021's Formula 2 champion (who also served as Alpine's reserve driver in 2022) and 2022 Formula 2 Championship fourth-place finisher Logan Sargeant, who signed with McLaren and Williams, respectively. The 2023 season also saw the debut of Liam Lawson, who finished third in Formula 2 in 2022 and made reserve driver appearances for AlphaTauri whilst also competing in Super Formula. He would later gain a full-time seat with the team during 2024. Three other drivers also made in-season debuts in 2024. Oliver Bearman, sixth in the 2023 standings, raced for both Ferrari and Haas as a reserve driver before securing a full-time Haas seat in 2025. Franco Colapinto left his 2024 Formula 2 campaign mid-season to join Williams, while Jack Doohan, third in 2023, debuted for Alpine in the final race of the year ahead of a full-time promotion in 2025. The 2025 season featured three additional graduates: 2024 champion Gabriel Bortoleto joined Sauber, runner-up Isack Hadjar signed with Racing Bulls, and sixth-placed Kimi Antonelli entered Formula One with Mercedes.

For 2026, sixth-placed Arvid Lindblad has joined Racing Bulls. For 2027, Rafael Câmara will join Haas.

In 2025, Lando Norris became the first graduate to win a Formula One World Drivers' Championship. This was followed by Kimi Antonelli in the following season, who also became the youngest World Champion at the age of 20.

- **Bold** denotes an active Formula One driver.

Driver	Formula 2					Formula 1						Other major titles after F2
Driver	Seasons	Races	Wins	Podiums	Best pos.	Seasons	First team	Races	Wins	Podiums	Points	Other major titles after F2
(Monaco) **Charles Leclerc**	2017	22	7	10	**1st**	2018–2026	Sauber	192	9	56	1922	
(Russia) Sergey Sirotkin	2017	2	0	0	20th	2018	Williams	21	0	0	1	
(United Kingdom) **George Russell**	2018	24	7	11	**1st**	2019–2026	Williams	173	8	32	1297	
(United Kingdom) **Lando Norris**	2017–2018	26	1	9	**2nd**	2019–2026	McLaren	172	14	51	1694	Formula One (2025)
(Thailand) **Alex Albon**	2017–2018	44	4	10	**3rd**	2019–2020, 2022–2026	Toro Rosso	147	0	2	318	
(Canada) Nicholas Latifi	2017–2019	67	6	20	**2nd**	2020–2022	Williams	61	0	0	9	
(United Kingdom) Jack Aitken	2018–2021	76	4	11	5th	2020	Williams	1	0	0	0	
(Japan) Yuki Tsunoda	2020	24	3	7	**3rd**	2021–2026	AlphaTauri	114	0	0	125	
(Germany) Mick Schumacher	2019–2020	46	3	11	**1st**	2021–2022	Haas	43	0	0	12	
(Russia) Nikita Mazepin	2019–2020	46	2	6	5th	2021	Haas	21	0	0	0	
(China) Zhou Guanyu	2019–2021	68	5	20	**3rd**	2022–2024	Alfa Romeo	68	0	0	16	
(Netherlands) Nyck de Vries	2017–2019	67	8	23	**1st**	2022–2023	Williams	11	0	0	2	Formula E (2020-21), 24 Hours of Le Mans (2026)
(Australia) **Oscar Piastri**	2021	23	6	11	**1st**	2023–2026	McLaren	89	9	29	966	
(United States) Logan Sargeant	2021–2022	31	2	4	4th	2023–2024	Williams	36	0	0	1	
(New Zealand) **Liam Lawson**	2021–2022	51	5	13	**3rd**	2023–2026	AlphaTauri	56	0	0	133	
(United Kingdom) **Oliver Bearman**	2023–2024	50	7	9	6th	2024–2026	Ferrari	48	0	0	71	
(Argentina) **Franco Colapinto**	2023–2024	22	1	3	9th	2024–2026	Williams	47	0	0	40	
(Australia) Jack Doohan	2021–2023	59	6	11	**3rd**	2024–2025	Alpine	7	0	0	0	
(Brazil) **Gabriel Bortoleto**	2024	28	2	8	**1st**	2025–2026	Sauber	44	0	0	33	
(France) **Isack Hadjar**	2023–2024	54	5	10	**2nd**	2025–2026	Racing Bulls	41	0	4	173	
(Italy) **Andrea Kimi Antonelli**	2024	26	2	3	6th	2025–2026	Mercedes	45	9	19	552	Formula One (2026)
(United Kingdom) **Arvid Lindblad**	2025	27	3	5	6th	2026	Racing Bulls	20	0	0	38	
(Brazil) **Rafael Câmara**	2026	25	3	7	TBD	2026	Haas	2	0	0	0	

== Rounds ==
The following fourteen circuits have contracts to host rounds for the 2026 season:

Round	Countries, rounds	Circuit	Years
1	(Australia) Melbourne Formula 2 round	Albert Park Circuit, Melbourne	2023–present
2	(United States) Miami Formula 2 round	Miami International Autodrome, Miami Gardens	2026
3	(Canada) Montreal Formula 2 round	Circuit Gilles Villeneuve, Montreal	2026–present
4	(Monaco) Monte Carlo Formula 2 round	Circuit de Monaco, Monaco	2017–2019, 2021–present
5	(Spain) Barcelona Formula 2 round	Circuit de Barcelona-Catalunya, Montmeló	2017–2020, 2022–2026
6	(Austria) Spielberg Formula 2 round	Red Bull Ring, Spielberg	2017–2020, 2022–present
7	(United Kingdom) Silverstone Formula 2 round	Silverstone Circuit, Silverstone	2017–present
8	(Belgium) Spa-Francorchamps Formula 2 round	Circuit de Spa-Francorchamps, Stavelot	2017–2020, 2022–2026
9	(Hungary) Budapest Formula 2 round	Hungaroring, Mogyoród	2017–2020, 2022–2026
10	(Italy) Monza Formula 2 round	Monza Circuit, Monza	2017–present
11	(Spain) Madrid Formula 2 round	Madring, Madrid	2026
12	(Azerbaijan) Baku Formula 2 round	Baku City Circuit, Baku	2017–2019, 2021–present
13	(Qatar) Lusail Formula 2 round	Lusail International Circuit, Lusail	2024–present
14	(United Arab Emirates) Yas Island Formula 2 round	Yas Marina Circuit, Abu Dhabi	2017–2019, 2021–present

The following four circuits will host rounds in the next season:

Number	Countries, rounds	Circuits	Years
1	(Bahrain) Sakhir Formula 2 round	Bahrain International Circuit	2017–2025, 2027
2	(Saudi Arabia) Jeddah Formula 2 round	Jeddah Corniche Circuit	2021–2025, 2027
3	(Turkey) Istanbul Formula 2 round	Istanbul Park	2027
4	Mexico City Formula 2 round	Autódromo Hermanos Rodríguez	2027

The following six circuits have hosted rounds for the previous seasons:

Number	Countries, rounds	Circuits	Years
1	(Spain) Jerez Formula 2 round	Circuito de Jerez	2017
2	(France) Le Castellet Formula 2 round	Circuit Paul Ricard	2018–2019, 2022
3	(Russia) Sochi Formula 2 round	Sochi Autodrom	2018–2021
4	(Italy) Mugello Formula 2 round	Mugello Circuit	2020
5	(Italy) Imola Formula 2 round	Imola Circuit	2022, 2024–2025
6	(Netherlands) Zandvoort Formula 2 round	Circuit Zandvoort	2022–2023

== Awards ==
=== Drivers' Championship ===
Season	Driver	Team	Poles	Wins	Podiums	Fastest laps	Points	% points achievable	Margin	Ref
2017	(Monaco) Charles Leclerc	(Italy) Prema Racing	8	7	10	4	282	53.409	71	
2018	(United Kingdom) George Russell	(France) ART Grand Prix	5	7	11	5	287	49.826	68	
2019	(Netherlands) Nyck de Vries	(France) ART Grand Prix	5	4	12	3	266	50.000	52	
2020	(Germany) Mick Schumacher	(Italy) Prema Racing	0	2	10	2	215	37.885	14	
2021	(Australia) Oscar Piastri	(Italy) Prema Racing	5	6	11	6	252.5	51.583	60.5	
2022	(Brazil) Felipe Drugovich	(Netherlands) MP Motorsport	4	5	11	4	265	48.535	101	
2023	(France) Théo Pourchaire	(France) ART Grand Prix	2	1	10	4	203	40.927	11	
2024	(Brazil) Gabriel Bortoleto	(United Kingdom) Invicta Racing	2	2	8	2	214.5	40.169	22.5	
2025	(Italy) Leonardo Fornaroli	(United Kingdom) Invicta Racing	3	4	9	0	211	41.617	36	

=== Teams' Championship ===
Season	Team	Poles	Wins	Podiums	Fastest laps	Points	% points achievable	Margin	Ref
2017	(Russia) Russian Time	1	6	14	6	395	46.037	15	
2018	(United Kingdom) Carlin	2	1	17	2	383	40.919	33	
2019	(France) DAMS	2	6	16	7	418	48.492	71	
2020	(Italy) Prema Racing	0	6	15	3	392	42.539	39.5	
2021	(Italy) Prema Racing (2)	5	8	19	9	444.5	55.252	156.5	
2022	(Netherlands) MP Motorsport	4	5	12	5	305	33.516	8	
2023	(France) ART Grand Prix	5	2	19	8	353	42.736	31	
2024	(United Kingdom) Invicta Racing	3	3	13	3	288.5	32.416	34.5	
2025	(United Kingdom) Invicta Racing (2)	5	5	14	0	316	37.396	38	

=== Anthoine Hubert Award ===
The Anthoine Hubert Award was established at the 2019 prize-giving ceremony in Monaco in honour of Anthoine Hubert, who was killed in an accident during the feature race at Spa-Francorchamps that year. This accolade is presented annually to the highest-placed driver in their first Formula 2 season and serves as the series' equivalent to a "Rookie of the Year" award.

Season	Driver	Team	Poles	Wins	Podiums	Fastest laps	Points	D.C.	Ref
2019	(China) Zhou Guanyu	(United Kingdom) UNI-Virtuosi Racing	1	0	5	2	140	7th	
2020	(Japan) Yuki Tsunoda	(United Kingdom) Carlin	4	3	7	1	200	3rd	
2021	(Australia) Oscar Piastri	(Italy) Prema Racing	5	6	11	6	252.5	1st	
2022	(Japan) Ayumu Iwasa (Note: Logan Sargeant finished first in the rookie standings, but the Anthoine Hubert award was awarded to Ayumu Iwasa, as Sargeant had previously been a substitute for the 2021 Jeddah round.)	(France) DAMS	2	2	6	1	141	5th	
2023	(France) Victor Martins	(France) ART Grand Prix	3	1	9	6	150	5th	
2024	(Brazil) Gabriel Bortoleto	(United Kingdom) Invicta Racing	2	2	8	2	214.5	1st	
2025	(Italy) Leonardo Fornaroli	(United Kingdom) Invicta Racing	3	4	9	0	211	1st	

== Car, technology and cost ==
Running a Formula 2 car is estimated to cost around US$3 million per season. In most cases, drivers must cover these expenses themselves, either through sponsorships or personal and family resources. These high costs remain one of the principal barriers to progressing into Formula One. To ease the financial burden, the FIA has implemented a number of cost-control measures, including freezing car specifications and reducing the number of venues, most notably with changes introduced for the 2021 season.

As of 2025, all teams in the FIA Formula 2 Championship compete with an identical car built around a carbon-fiber Dallara chassis and powered by a single-turbocharged Mecachrome V634 engine, which is next scheduled for an update in 2029. The car is expected to weigh a minimum of 755 kg (1,664 lb), with the driver, and is equipped with a Hewland-supplied gearbox featuring an eight-position barrel with ratchet body and software refinements that improve gear selection. Clutches are supplied by ZF Sachs and operated through a hand-paddle lever.

Since the inception of the GP2 Series in 2005, the OZ Group has been the sole wheel supplier. In 2020, the category moved from 13 in (330 mm) to 18 in (457 mm) magnesium-alloy wheels inspired by road-car designs. This change, made in anticipation of Formula One's 2022 wheel regulations, also allowed closer data sharing between the two series. Pirelli has exclusively supplied tyres for Formula 2 since 2017. They currently provide four slick options: a purple supersoft, red soft, yellow medium, and white hard. A single wet compound with a blue sidewall is also supplied during rainy conditions.

The cars are equipped with a standard FIA Premier FT5 safety tank with a maximum capacity of 125 litres. Refuelling during races, however, is prohibited for safety and cost control reasons. In 2023, Aramco became the official fuel partner for the series, providing all entrants with standardised fuel.

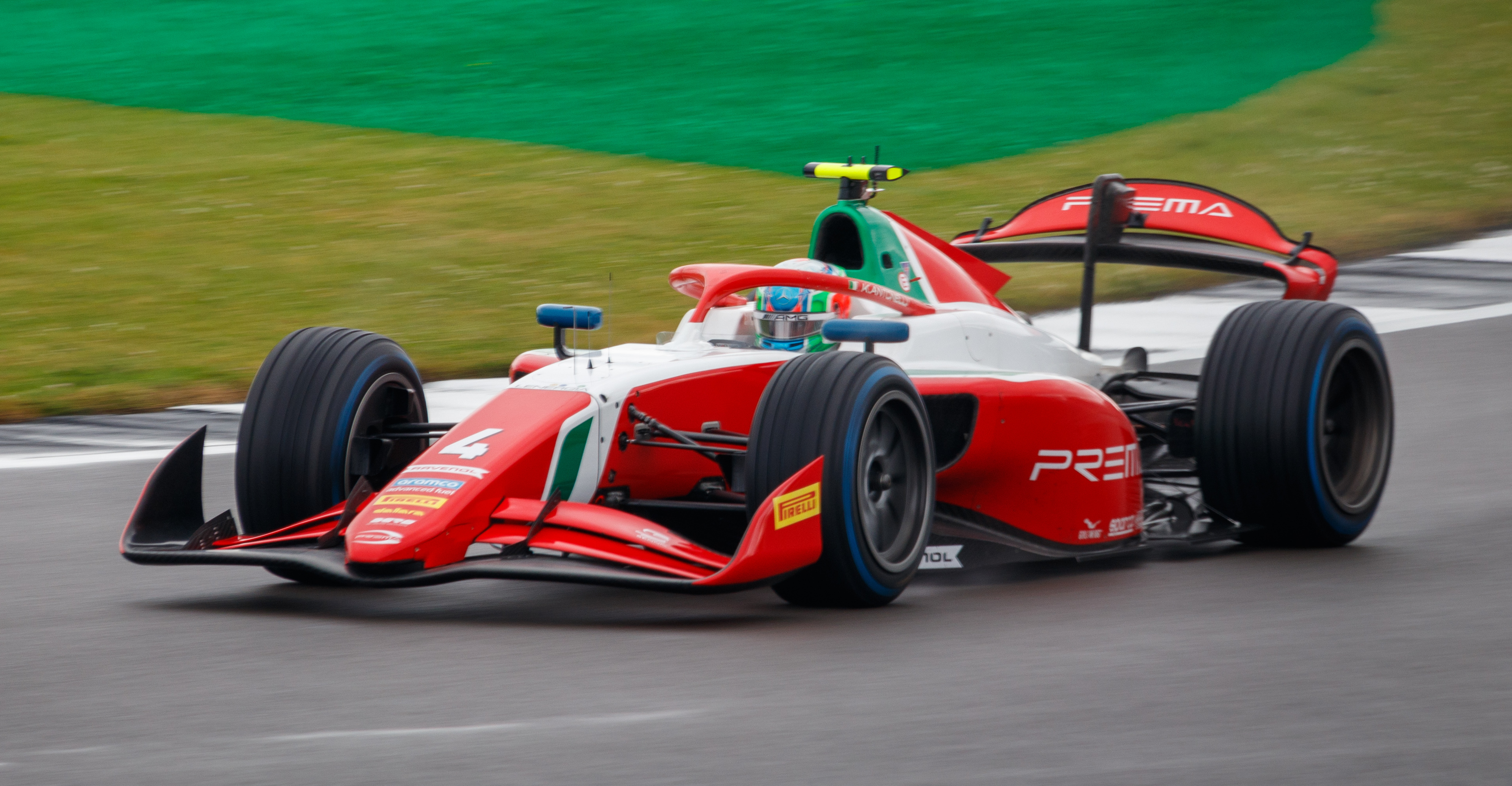
Kimi Antonelli driving the Dallara F2 2024 at Silverstone Circuit for Prema Racing.

Driver control systems remain deliberately simple. Steering is rack-and-pinion and entirely manual, without power assistance, similar to the IndyCar Series. XAP Technology has supplied steering wheels since 2011, with the current Formula 2451 S3 model introduced in 2018. It includes six front-facing buttons, five rear paddles for DRS, gear shifting, and clutch operation, as well as three rotary switches, closely resembling the layout of its Formula E counterpart. Electronics are also standardised across the grid: all cars carry a Marelli Marvel SRG 480 electronic control unit and a Marelli PDU 12-42 power supply management unit. Telemetry is limited to broadcast purposes, though teams may access data when the car is in the garage.

Since 2015, the series has also employed the Drag Reduction System (DRS), which lowers the angle of the rear wing's upper element by more than 40 degrees to aid overtaking when a driver is within one second of a rival. The system is deactivated automatically in wet conditions for safety.

Despite being slower than Formula One cars, Formula 2 remains amongst the fastest single-seaters in motorsport, capable of reaching top speeds of around 335 km/h in low-downforce configuration. Their distinguishing performance lies in cornering and braking, where downforce allows up to 3.9 g of lateral acceleration and 3.6 g under braking, compared with 2.6 g for Formula 3 and around 1.7 g for production-based Porsche Carrera Cup cars. As an example of the differences between the FIA formula categories, at Albert Park Circuit, the Formula 2 lap record stands at 1:28.989, compared with 1:19.813 for Formula One and 1:33.025 for Formula 3. As Liam Lawson, a driver with experience across F1, F2, and Japan's Super Formula, noted in 2023, the latter category is "faster than Formula 2, a lot closer to Formula 1, and sometimes it even feels like F1 in some corners. Downforce is pretty exceptional."

At the same time, speed has also been progressively reinforced over the series’ history. Each car must meet FIA standards for frontal, side, rear, and steering-column impact tests and is built with roll hoops, impact structures, and push-tested monocoques. Anti-intrusion survival cells have been mandatory since 2011, alongside wheel tether cables to reduce the risk of wheels detaching in crashes. The halo driver crash-protection device was introduced in 2018.

== Media coverage ==
Formula Two is broadcast live in almost every country and territory worldwide. From 2017 to 2024, commentary for races was covered by Alex Jacques. In 2025, the FIA announced that Chris McCarthey would be replacing him going forward.

Although Formula One Management owns the television rights for this series, alongside those of Formula One, FIA Formula 3 Championship and F1 Academy, they have licensed the same to several different regional companies. The series is also available globally through F1 TV, Formula One Management's own streaming platform. Sky-branded operators hold rights in several territories: Sky Sports in the United Kingdom, Sky Deutschland in Germany, and Sky Sport in New Zealand, with Sky Italia covering Italy. Viaplay holds rights across Denmark, Norway, Finland, Iceland, and the Netherlands, while Sweden is served by V Sport and Viaplay Channels. In Africa, SuperSport is the primary broadcaster, while beIN Sports covers the Middle East, North Africa, Turkey, and much of Asia. In North America, coverage in Canada is provided by RDS and TSN, while United States rights are held by Apple TV+ as part of its Formula One broadcast agreement.

Between 2019 and 2021, Match! Arena broadcast races in Russia. Following Russia's invasion of Ukraine in February 2022, Formula One Management terminated its Russian broadcast contracts across all series under its control, ending coverage in March 2022.

== See also ==
- List of FIA Formula 2 Championship drivers
- List of FIA Formula 2 Championship race winners
