= 2018 Formula 2 Championship =

Second-tier auto racing season

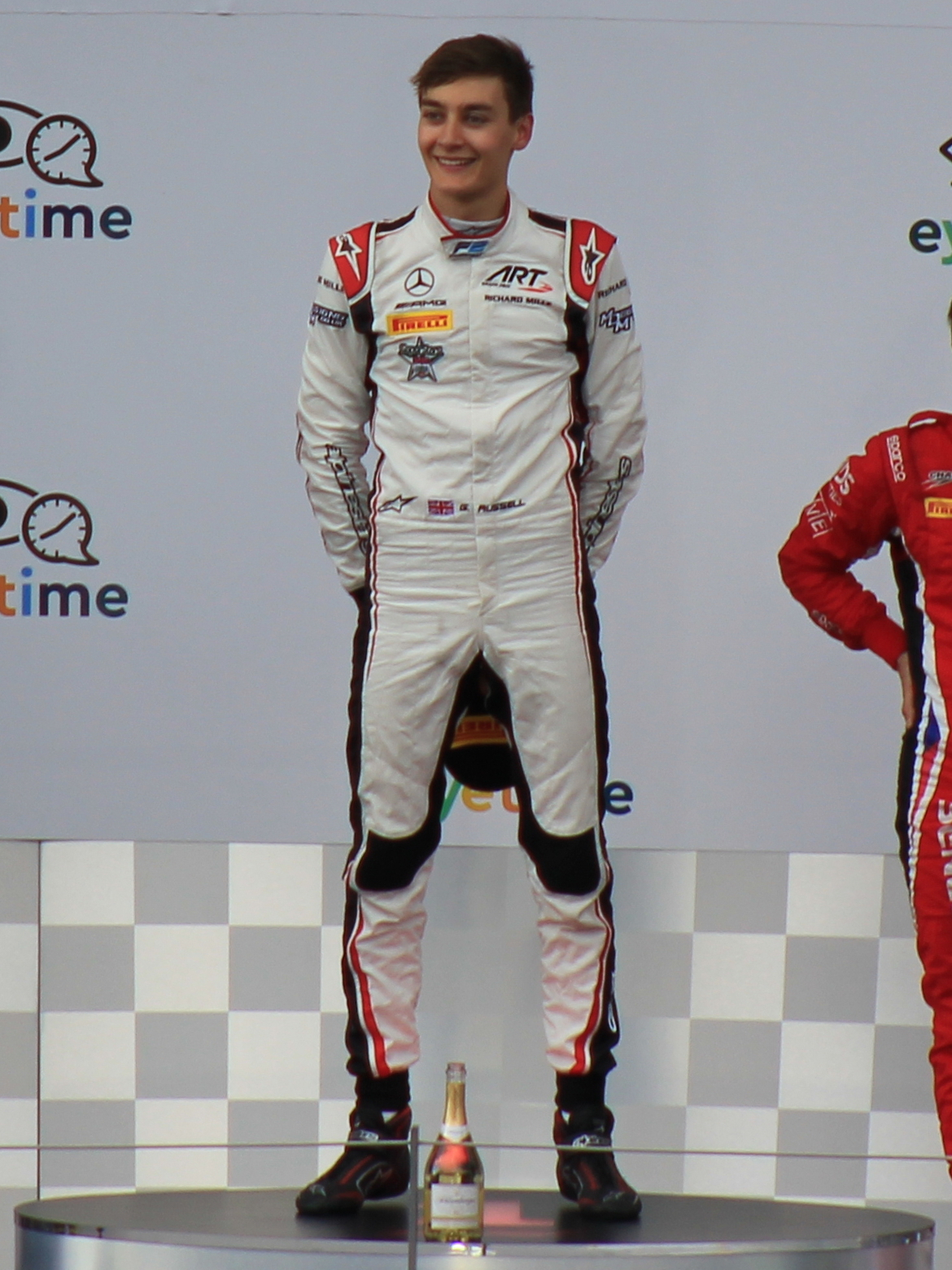
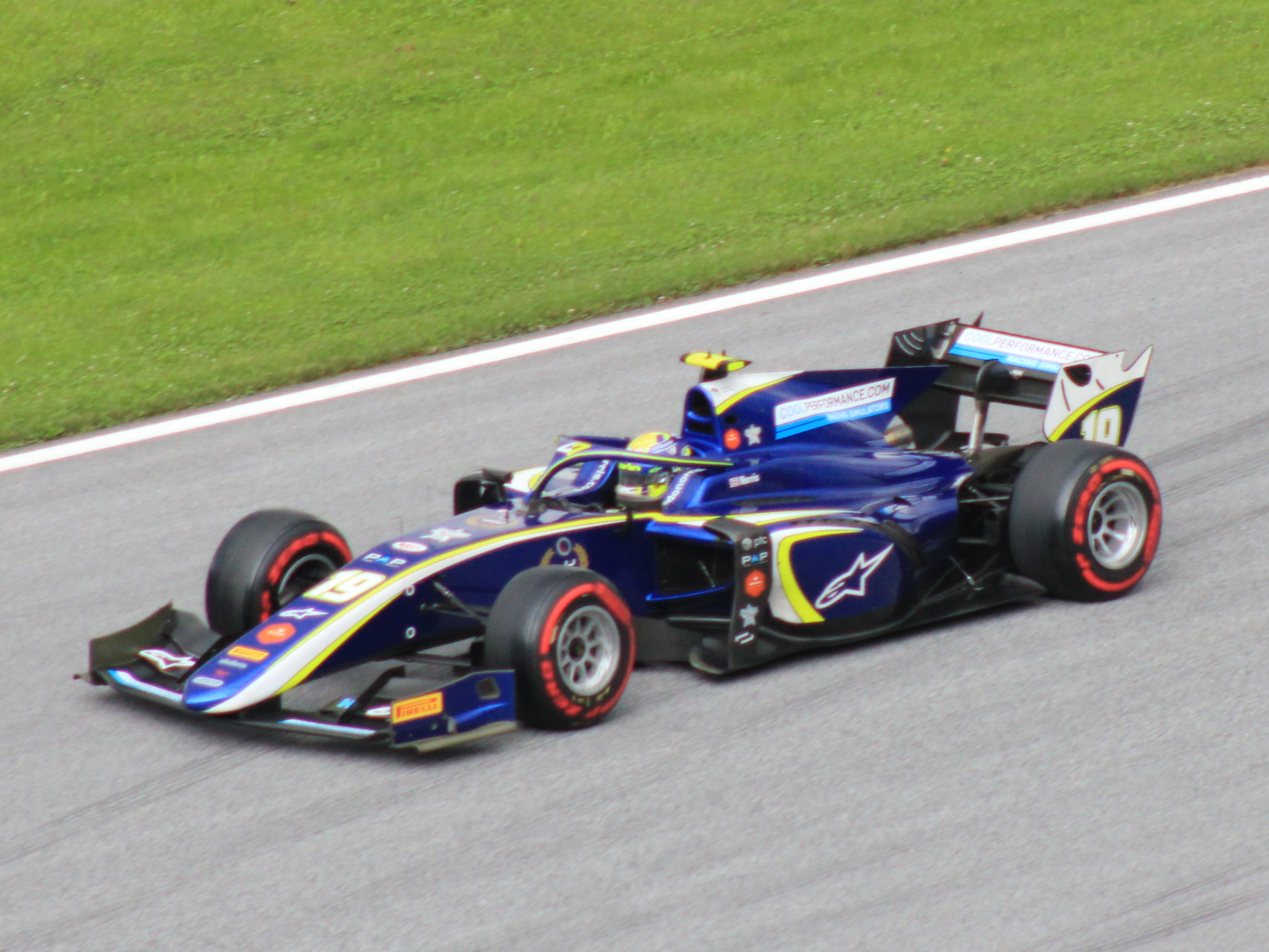
George Russell (left) and Carlin Racing (right) won the Drivers' and Teams' championships, respectively

The 2018 FIA Formula 2 Championship was the fifty-second season of the second-tier of Formula One feeder championship and also second season under the moniker of FIA Formula 2 Championship, a motor racing championship for Formula 2 cars that is sanctioned by the Fédération Internationale de l'Automobile (FIA). It is an open-wheel racing category that serves as the second tier of formula racing in the FIA Global Pathway. The category run in support of the 2018 FIA Formula One World Championship, with each of the twelve rounds running in conjunction with a Grand Prix. It was the first FIA Formula 2 season to feature a new chassis and engine package.

Charles Leclerc was the reigning drivers' champion, having won the title at the penultimate round of the 2017 championship in Jerez de la Frontera. Leclerc subsequently secured a Formula 1 drive with the Alfa Romeo Sauber team in 2018 (Note: Under the series' sporting regulations, the defending drivers' champion is not permitted to continue racing in the championship, so Leclerc would not be able to defend his title.) Russian Time were the reigning teams' champions, having secured their first Formula 2 title at the final round of the 2017 championship in Abu Dhabi. George Russell won the drivers' championship, finishing 68 points ahead of Lando Norris. In the teams' championship, Carlin prevailed over ART Grand Prix by 31 points. Champion Russell won 7 races during his season, Alexander Albon took 4 race victories, whilst 3 races were won by Nyck de Vries, Artem Markelov, 2 wins went to Antonio Fuoco, driver of new Charouz Racing System team. Other winners, who were victorious once - its runner-up Norris, Jack Aitken, Maximilian Günther, Nicholas Latifi, and Tadasuke Makino.

== Changes for 2018 ==
=== Technical changes ===
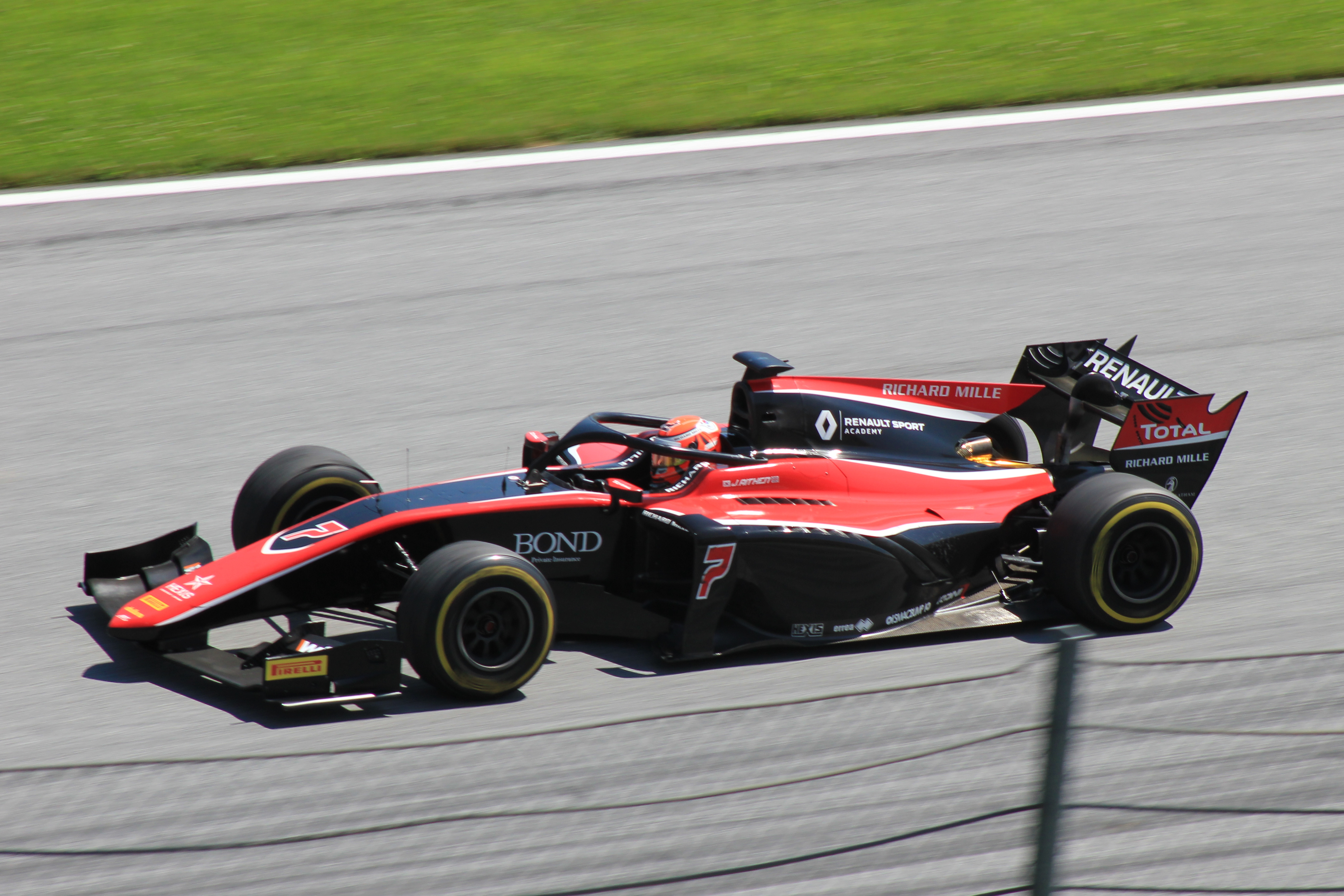
The new Dallara F2 2018 made its début in 2018.

The season saw the introduction of a brand new chassis and engine package, the biggest change in the sport's history. The GP2/11 chassis, which had been used by Formula 2 and its predecessor GP2 since 2011, was replaced by the Dallara F2 2018. It was powered by a fuel-efficient 3.4 litres (207 cubic inches) V6 single-turbocharged direct-injected engine developed by Mecachrome called V634T. The aging naturally-aspirated V8 engine and Dallara GP2/11 chassis which were used since 2005 and 2011 respectively were permanently retired. Despite the generational change of chassis and engines, Elf would continue as a preferred official fuel partner and supplier of FIA Formula 2 Championship and also Pirelli FIA Formula 2 tyre sizes would remained same as pre-2017 Formula One tyres. In addition, the Pirelli FIA Formula 2 hard tyre colour would repainted from orange to ice blue in a reference of 2018 Formula One dry slick tyre compounds.

=== Sporting regulations ===
Teams were required to use the "halo" cockpit protection device, a wishbone-shaped frame mounted above and around the driver's head and anchored to the monocoque forward of the cockpit. The halo was designed to improve safety standards by deflecting debris away from a driver's head and was originally developed for use in Formula One before its application was expanded to other open-wheel championships and it was incorporated into the final design of the Dallara F2 2018 chassis.

Following widespread criticism of the Dallara F2 2018 for its difficult start procedure and reliability issues, the championship temporarily introduced rolling starts until a solution to the car's problems could be found.

=== Other changes ===
The championship discontinued the use of promotional models or "grid girls". The decision was made by Formula One management in the face of changing social attitudes and the decision by other sports to phase out the use of models, and the decision applied to all categories appearing on the Grand Prix support bill, including Formula 2.

== Entries ==
The following teams and drivers were under contract to compete in the 2018 FIA Formula 2 Championship. As the championship was a spec series, all competitors raced with identical Dallara F2 2018 chassis with a V6 turbo engine developed by Mecachrome. Teams competed with tyres supplied by Pirelli.

Entrant	No.	Driver name	Rounds
(Russia) Russian Time	1	(Russia) Artem Markelov	All
(Russia) Russian Time	2	(Japan) Tadasuke Makino	All
(Italy) Pertamina Prema Theodore Racing (1–7) (Italy) Pertamina Prema Racing (8–12)	3	(Indonesia) Sean Gelael	All
(Italy) Pertamina Prema Theodore Racing (1–7) (Italy) Pertamina Prema Racing (8–12)	4	(Netherlands) Nyck de Vries	All
(France) DAMS	5	(Thailand) Alexander Albon	All
(France) DAMS	6	(Canada) Nicholas Latifi	All
(France) ART Grand Prix	7	(United Kingdom) Jack Aitken	All
(France) ART Grand Prix	8	(United Kingdom) George Russell	All
(Netherlands) MP Motorsport	9	(Spain) Roberto Merhi	1–8
(Netherlands) MP Motorsport	9	(France) Dorian Boccolacci	9–12
(Netherlands) MP Motorsport	10	(Switzerland) Ralph Boschung	1–10
(Netherlands) MP Motorsport	10	(Finland) Niko Kari	11–12
(United Kingdom) BWT Arden	11	(Germany) Maximilian Günther	1–11
(United Kingdom) BWT Arden	11	(United Kingdom) Dan Ticktum	12
(United Kingdom) BWT Arden	12	(Japan) Nirei Fukuzumi	All
(Spain) Campos Vexatec Racing	14	(Italy) Luca Ghiotto	All
(Spain) Campos Vexatec Racing	15	(Israel) Roy Nissany	1–10
(Spain) Campos Vexatec Racing	15	(Spain) Roberto Merhi	11–12
(Italy) Trident	16	(India) Arjun Maini	All
(Italy) Trident	17	(United States) Santino Ferrucci	1–7
(Italy) Trident	17	(Italy) Alessio Lorandi	8–12
(United Kingdom) Carlin	18	(Brazil) Sérgio Sette Câmara	All
(United Kingdom) Carlin	19	(United Kingdom) Lando Norris	All
(Czech Republic) Charouz Racing System	20	(Switzerland) Louis Delétraz	All
(Czech Republic) Charouz Racing System	21	(Italy) Antonio Fuoco	All

=== Team changes ===
Twenty entries spread across ten teams were entered into the championship. Carlin returned to Formula 2 in 2018 after a one-year absence, while former World Series Formula V8 3.5 team Charouz Racing System joined the championship. Charouz left the Formula 3.5 V8 championship when the championship was discontinued and the team subsequently submitted an entry to join the Formula 2 grid which marked the return of a Czech single-seater junior team to the second tier of Formula One's feeder championships since the 2003 International Formula 3000 season. Racing Engineering were included on the initial entry list but later withdrew from the championship to focus on their European Le Mans Series entry. Fortec Motorsports were due to make their Formula 2 début, replacing the departing Rapax team, but later withdrew their entry due to a lack of sponsorship. Fortec were later granted permission to defer their entry by a year and were scheduled to make their début in 2019, but aborted the plans.

=== Driver changes ===
Defending teams' champions Russian Time signed FIA Formula 3 European Championship driver Tadasuke Makino to partner Artem Markelov. With reigning drivers' champion Charles Leclerc leaving the series to join Formula 1 team Sauber. Prema Racing enlisted Sean Gelael, who left Arden International to join the team. Gelael was partnered by Nyck de Vries, who drove for Rapax and Racing Engineering throughout the 2017 championship. Gustav Malja, who raced for Racing Engineering in 2017, moved to the Porsche Supercup.

Alexander Albon left ART Grand Prix to join DAMS where he replaced Oliver Rowland; Rowland left the series and moved to the FIA World Endurance Championship. Albon was paired with Nicholas Latifi, who remained with the team for a third year. ART Grand Prix promoted reigning GP3 Series champion George Russell to the category, partnering him with Jack Aitken, who also drove for the team in GP3. Nobuharu Matsushita, who drove for the team in 2017, left the series and returned to Japan to race in the Super Formula Championship.

Ralph Boschung left Campos Racing to join MP Motorsport. He was accompanied by Roberto Merhi, who previously competed in selected rounds of the championship with Campos and Rapax in 2017. Jordan King, who raced for MP, moved to the United States to compete in the IndyCar Series. With Gelael's switch to Prema and Norman Nato's departure to the European Le Mans Series, Arden International promoted two rookie drivers. Former GP3 Series driver Nirei Fukuzumi filled one seat, while Maximilian Günther—who finished second in the 2016 FIA Formula 3 European Championship and third in 2017—took the other.

Luca Ghiotto left Russian Time after a single season to join Campos Racing. He was partnered by series debutant Roy Nissany, who left the World Series Formula V8 3.5 to join the championship. Álex Palou left the team to compete in the FIA Formula 3 European Championship. Trident recruited two of Formula One team Haas' development drivers. Santino Ferrucci, who had contested five rounds of the 2017 championship with the team, was signed for the season. He is partnered by Arjun Maini, who was promoted from the GP3 Series. Nabil Jeffri, who raced for Trident in 2017, left the team to join the FIA World Endurance Championship.

Sérgio Sette Câmara left MP Motorsport to join newcomers Carlin. He was partnered by Lando Norris, who won the 2017 FIA Formula 3 European Championship title with Carlin before making a guest appearance in the Formula 2 Championship with Campos Racing. Louis Delétraz and Antonio Fuoco joined Charouz Racing System. Delétraz left Rapax after the team withdrew from the championship, while Fuoco moved from Prema Racing as part of an agreement with Ferrari's driver development programme.

==== Mid-season changes ====
Santino Ferrucci was banned for two rounds as punishment for multiple violations of the sporting and technical regulations—including deliberately nudging Arjun Maini on the cool down lap after the Silverstone round. He was later dismissed by Trident, with the team citing sponsorship issues rather than his suspension as the reason for Ferrucci's firing. Ferrucci was replaced by Trident's GP3 Series driver Alessio Lorandi for the Hungaroring round.

Roberto Merhi left MP Motorsport before the Spa-Francorchamps round. He was replaced by Dorian Boccolacci, who raced for the team in the GP3 Series. For the remainder of the season he joined Campos Vexatec Racing, replacing Roy Nissany. MP Motorsport promoted Niko Kari from their GP3 Series team, where he replaced Ralph Boschung for the remainder of the season. Dan Ticktum replaced Maximilian Günther at BWT Arden for the season finale at Abu Dhabi.

== Calendar ==
The following twelve rounds took place as part of the 2018 championship. Each round consisted of two races: a Feature race, which was run over 170 km (105.6 mi) and included a mandatory pit stop; and a Sprint race, which was run over 120 km (75 mi) and did not require drivers to make a pit stop. (Note: The Feature and Sprint races are time-certain. In the event that the full race distance cannot be completed, the Feature race will end after one hour and the Sprint race after forty-five minutes.)

Round	Circuit	Feature race	Sprint race
1	Bahrain International Circuit, Sakhir	7 April	8 April
2	(Azerbaijan) Baku City Circuit, Baku	28 April	29 April
3	(Spain) Circuit de Barcelona-Catalunya, Montmeló	12 May	13 May
4	Circuit de Monaco, Monte Carlo	25 May	26 May
5	(France) Circuit Paul Ricard, Le Castellet	23 June	24 June
6	(Austria) Red Bull Ring, Spielberg	30 June	1 July
7	(United Kingdom) Silverstone Circuit, Silverstone	7 July	8 July
8	(Hungary) Hungaroring, Mogyoród	28 July	29 July
9	(Belgium) Circuit de Spa-Francorchamps, Stavelot	25 August	26 August
10	(Italy) Autodromo Nazionale Monza, Monza	1 September	2 September
11	(Russia) Sochi Autodrom, Sochi	29 September	30 September
12	(United Arab Emirates) Yas Marina Circuit, Abu Dhabi	24 November	25 November

=== Calendar changes ===
The calendar was expanded to twelve rounds in 2018. The championship started at the Circuit Paul Ricard, where it was featured as part of the French Grand Prix support programme. The championship visited the Sochi Autodrom for the first time, where it ran in support of the Russian Grand Prix. The stand-alone event that was held at the Circuito de Jerez in 2017 was discontinued.

== Results ==
=== Season summary ===
Round		Circuit	Pole position	Fastest lap	Winning driver	Winning team	Report
1	F	Bahrain International Circuit	(United Kingdom) Lando Norris	(United Kingdom) Lando Norris	(United Kingdom) Lando Norris	(United Kingdom) Carlin	Report
1	S	Bahrain International Circuit		(Netherlands) Nyck de Vries	(Russia) Artem Markelov	(Russia) Russian Time	Report
2	F	(Azerbaijan) Baku City Circuit	(Thailand) Alexander Albon	(United Kingdom) George Russell (Note: George Russell set the fastest lap, but did not finish in the top 10, so was ineligible to be the point-scorer for the fastest lap. Antonio Fuoco was the point-scorer instead for setting the fastest lap of those finishing in the top 10.)	(Thailand) Alexander Albon	(France) DAMS	Report
2	S	(Azerbaijan) Baku City Circuit		(United Kingdom) Jack Aitken (Note: Jack Aitken set the fastest lap, but did not finish in the top 10, so was ineligible to be the point-scorer for the fastest lap. George Russell was the point-scorer instead for setting the fastest lap of those finishing in the top 10.)	(United Kingdom) George Russell	(France) ART Grand Prix	Report
3	F	(Spain) Circuit de Barcelona-Catalunya	(Thailand) Alexander Albon	(Canada) Nicholas Latifi (Note: Nicholas Latifi set the fastest lap, but did not finish in the top 10, so was ineligible to be the point-scorer for the fastest lap. Artem Markelov was the point-scorer instead for setting the fastest lap of those finishing in the top 10.)	(United Kingdom) George Russell	(France) ART Grand Prix	Report
3	S	(Spain) Circuit de Barcelona-Catalunya		(United Kingdom) George Russell	(United Kingdom) Jack Aitken	(France) ART Grand Prix	Report
4	F	Circuit de Monaco	(Thailand) Alexander Albon	(Germany) Maximilian Günther (Note: Maximilian Günther set the fastest lap, but did not finish in the top 10, so was ineligible to be the point-scorer for the fastest lap. Artem Markelov was the point-scorer instead for setting the fastest lap of those finishing in the top 10.)	(Russia) Artem Markelov	(Russia) Russian Time	Report
4	S	Circuit de Monaco		(Canada) Nicholas Latifi	(Italy) Antonio Fuoco	(Czech Republic) Charouz Racing System	Report
5	F	(France) Circuit Paul Ricard	(United Kingdom) George Russell	(Netherlands) Nyck de Vries	(United Kingdom) George Russell	(France) ART Grand Prix	Report
5	S	(France) Circuit Paul Ricard		(Switzerland) Ralph Boschung (Note: Ralph Boschung set the fastest lap, but did not finish in the top 10, so was ineligible to be the point-scorer for the fastest lap. Nyck de Vries was the point-scorer instead for setting the fastest lap of those finishing in the top 10.)	(Netherlands) Nyck de Vries	(Italy) Pertamina Prema Theodore Racing	Report
6	F	(Austria) Red Bull Ring	(United Kingdom) George Russell	(Russia) Artem Markelov	(United Kingdom) George Russell	(France) ART Grand Prix	Report
6	S	(Austria) Red Bull Ring		(Russia) Artem Markelov	(Russia) Artem Markelov	(Russia) Russian Time	Report
7	F	(United Kingdom) Silverstone Circuit	(United Kingdom) George Russell	(United Kingdom) George Russell	(Thailand) Alexander Albon	(France) DAMS	Report
7	S	(United Kingdom) Silverstone Circuit		(Brazil) Sérgio Sette Câmara (Note: Sérgio Sette Câmara set the fastest lap, but did not finish in the top 10, so was ineligible to be the point-scorer for the fastest lap. George Russell was the point-scorer instead for setting the fastest lap of those finishing in the top 10.)	(Germany) Maximilian Günther	(United Kingdom) BWT Arden	Report
8	F	(Hungary) Hungaroring	(Brazil) Sérgio Sette Câmara	(Switzerland) Ralph Boschung (Note: Ralph Boschung set the fastest lap, but did not finish in the top 10, so was ineligible to be the point-scorer for the fastest lap. Nyck de Vries was the point-scorer instead for setting the fastest lap of those finishing in the top 10.)	(Netherlands) Nyck de Vries	(Italy) Pertamina Prema Racing	Report
8	S	(Hungary) Hungaroring		(Italy) Antonio Fuoco (Note: Antonio Fuoco set the fastest lap, but did not finish in the top 10, so was ineligible to be the point-scorer for the fastest lap. Luca Ghiotto was the point-scorer instead for setting the fastest lap of those finishing in the top 10.)	(Thailand) Alexander Albon	(France) DAMS	Report
9	F	(Belgium) Circuit de Spa-Francorchamps	(Netherlands) Nyck de Vries	(Netherlands) Nyck de Vries	(Netherlands) Nyck de Vries	(Italy) Pertamina Prema Racing	Report
9	S	(Belgium) Circuit de Spa-Francorchamps		(Canada) Nicholas Latifi	(Canada) Nicholas Latifi	(France) DAMS	Report
10	F	(Italy) Autodromo Nazionale Monza	(United Kingdom) George Russell	(Brazil) Sérgio Sette Câmara (Note: Sérgio Sette Câmara set the fastest lap, but did not finish in the top 10, so was ineligible to be the point-scorer for the fastest lap. Artem Markelov was the point-scorer instead for setting the fastest lap of those finishing in the top 10.)	(Japan) Tadasuke Makino	(Russia) Russian Time	Report
10	S	(Italy) Autodromo Nazionale Monza		(Brazil) Sérgio Sette Câmara	(United Kingdom) George Russell	(France) ART Grand Prix	Report
11	F	(Russia) Sochi Autodrom	(Netherlands) Nyck de Vries	(Netherlands) Nyck de Vries	(Thailand) Alexander Albon	(France) DAMS	Report
11	S	(Russia) Sochi Autodrom		(United Kingdom) George Russell	(United Kingdom) George Russell	(France) ART Grand Prix	Report
12	F	(United Arab Emirates) Yas Marina Circuit	(United Kingdom) George Russell	(Italy) Luca Ghiotto	(United Kingdom) George Russell	(France) ART Grand Prix	Report
12	S	(United Arab Emirates) Yas Marina Circuit		(United Kingdom) George Russell	(Italy) Antonio Fuoco	(Czech Republic) Charouz Racing System	Report

== Championship standings ==
=== Scoring system ===
Points were awarded to the top 10 classified finishers in the Feature race, and to the top 8 classified finishers in the Sprint race. The pole-sitter in the feature race also received four points, and two points were given to the driver who set the fastest lap inside the top ten in both the feature and sprint races. No extra points are awarded to the pole-sitter in the sprint race as the grid for the sprint race is based on the results of the feature race with the top eight drivers having their positions reversed.

Feature race points

Position	**1st**	**2nd**	**3rd**	**4th**	**5th**	**6th**	**7th**	**8th**	**9th**	**10th**	**Pole**	**FL**
Points	25	18	15	12	10	8	6	4	2	1	4	2

Sprint race points

Position	**1st**	**2nd**	**3rd**	**4th**	**5th**	**6th**	**7th**	**8th**	**FL**
Points	15	12	10	8	6	4	2	1	2

=== Drivers' championship ===
Pos.	Driver	BHR (Bahrain)		BAK (Azerbaijan)		CAT (Spain)		MCO (Monaco)		LEC (France)		RBR (Austria)		SIL (United Kingdom)		HUN (Hungary)		SPA (Belgium)		MNZ (Italy)		SOC (Russia)		YMC (United Arab Emirates)		Points
Pos.	Driver	FR	SR	FR	SR	FR	SR	FR	SR	FR	SR	FR	SR	FR	SR	FR	SR	FR	SR	FR	SR	FR	SR	FR	SR	Points
1	(United Kingdom) George Russell	5	19	12	1	1	4	Ret	Ret	**1**	17	**1**	2	**2**	2	Ret	8	3	7	**4**	1	4	1	**1**	4	287
2	(United Kingdom) Lando Norris	**1**	4	6	4	3	3	6	3	16	5	2	11	10	3	2	4	4	2	6	5	Ret	Ret	5	2	219
3	(Thailand) Alexander Albon	4	13	**1**	13	**5**	2	**Ret**	Ret	Ret	7	5	5	1	7	5	1	5	3	3	Ret	1	3	14	8	212
4	(Netherlands) Nyck de Vries	6	5	Ret	2	2	Ret	Ret	9	5	1	Ret	14	7	6	1	7	**1**	4	9	17	**3**	4	4	5	202
5	(Russia) Artem Markelov	3	1	Ret	Ret	8	9	1	4	14	14†	8	1	6	4	8	13	6	5	2	2	11	5	2	7	186
6	(Brazil) Sérgio Sette Câmara	2	3	4	DSQ	7	Ret	WD	WD	2	6	6	3	Ret	17	**7**	3	2	9	7	3	5	2	16	10	164
7	(Italy) Antonio Fuoco	17	12	3	DNS	10	7	8	1	4	4	3	4	3	Ret	3	17	17	19	DSQ	10	6	9	7	1	141
8	(Italy) Luca Ghiotto	12	6	Ret	14	4	5	Ret	10	3	3	12	13	5	10	6	2	7	6	10	6	Ret	14	3	9	111
9	(Canada) Nicholas Latifi	11	10	5	3	14	8	9	8	7	8	11	8	17	16	Ret	16	8	1	5	4	2	Ret	Ret	15	91
10	(Switzerland) Louis Delétraz	13	9	Ret	10	Ret	10	4	2	6	2	Ret	Ret	4	5	17	9	18	13	13	11	12	13	6	6	74
11	(United Kingdom) Jack Aitken	9	18	2	11	6	1	7	Ret	11	DNS	Ret	18	13	12	4	10	11	10	17†	8	14	Ret	10	13	63
12	(Spain) Roberto Merhi	DNS	11	8	7	13	Ret	3	7	DSQ	15	4	16	11	9	11	5					9	6	8	3	61
13	(Japan) Tadasuke Makino	19	17	9	9	9	Ret	14†	Ret	8	Ret	7	6	12	11	9	12	12	11	1	14	10	11	9	Ret	48
14	(Germany) Maximilian Günther	8	2	Ret	15†	Ret	12	11	6	12	11	15	12	8	1	16	Ret	9	16	12	16	16†	10			41
15	(Indonesia) Sean Gelael	7	16	10	Ret	Ret	6	2	Ret	Ret	18	13	Ret	Ret	15	13	11	16	Ret	11	Ret	DNS	12	17	Ret	29
16	(India) Arjun Maini	15	14	Ret	5	Ret	13	5	5	10	13	14	10	14	13	12	14	14	8	Ret	9	15	15	Ret	DNS	24
17	(Japan) Nirei Fukuzumi	18	8	13	12	11	Ret	10	11†	9	12	9	9	Ret	DNS	10	6	Ret	17	14	13	8	7	Ret	12	17
18	(Switzerland) Ralph Boschung	10	7	7	8	Ret	Ret	Ret	Ret	Ret	16	Ret	15	9	8	18	Ret	Ret	12	8	Ret					17
19	(United States) Santino Ferrucci	14	20	11	6	DNS	11	13	12†	13	9	10	7	16	DSQ											7
20	(Italy) Alessio Lorandi															14	Ret	13	15	15	12	7	Ret	13	14	6
21	(France) Dorian Boccolacci																	15	18	Ret	7	13	8	12	11	3
22	(Israel) Roy Nissany	16	15	Ret	Ret	12	14	12	Ret	15	10	Ret	17	15	14	15	15	10	14	16	15					1
23	(United Kingdom) Dan Ticktum																							11	Ret	0
24	(Finland) Niko Kari																					Ret	Ret	15	Ret	0
Pos.	Driver	FR	SR	FR	SR	FR	SR	FR	SR	FR	SR	FR	SR	FR	SR	FR	SR	FR	SR	FR	SR	FR	SR	FR	SR	Points
Pos.	Driver	BHR (Bahrain)		BAK (Azerbaijan)		CAT (Spain)		MCO (Monaco)		LEC (France)		RBR (Austria)		SIL (United Kingdom)		HUN (Hungary)		SPA (Belgium)		MNZ (Italy)		SOC (Russia)		YMC (United Arab Emirates)		Points

Key
Colour	Result
Gold	Winner
Silver	2nd place
Bronze	3rd place
Green	Other points position
Blue	Other classified position
Blue	Not classified, finished (NC)
Purple	Not classified, retired (Ret)
Red	Did not qualify (DNQ)
Red	Did not pre-qualify (DNPQ)
Black	Disqualified (DSQ)
White	Did not start (DNS)
White	Race cancelled (C)
Blank	Did not practice (DNP)
Blank	Excluded (EX)
Blank	Did not arrive (DNA)
Blank	Withdrawn (WD)
Text formatting	Meaning
**Bold**	Pole position point(s)
Italics	Fastest lap point(s)

Notes:

- † – Drivers did not finish the race, but were classified as they completed more than 90% of the race distance.

=== Teams' championship ===
Pos.	Team	No.	BHR (Bahrain)		BAK (Azerbaijan)		CAT (Spain)		MCO (Monaco)		LEC (France)		RBR (Austria)		SIL (United Kingdom)		HUN (Hungary)		SPA (Belgium)		MNZ (Italy)		SOC (Russia)		YMC (United Arab Emirates)		Points
Pos.	Team	No.	FR	SR	FR	SR	FR	SR	FR	SR	FR	SR	FR	SR	FR	SR	FR	SR	FR	SR	FR	SR	FR	SR	FR	SR	Points
1	(United Kingdom) Carlin	18	2	3	4	DSQ	7	Ret	WD	WD	2	6	6	3	Ret	17	**7**	3	2	9	7	3	5	2	16	10	383
1	(United Kingdom) Carlin	19	**1**	4	6	4	3	3	6	3	16	5	2	11	10	3	2	4	4	2	6	5	Ret	Ret	5	2	383
2	(France) ART Grand Prix	7	9	18	2	11	6	1	7	Ret	11	DNS	Ret	18	13	12	4	10	11	10	17†	8	14	Ret	10	13	350
2	(France) ART Grand Prix	8	5	19	12	1	1	4	Ret	Ret	**1**	17	**1**	2	**2**	2	Ret	8	3	7	**4**	1	4	1	**1**	4	350
3	(France) DAMS	5	4	13	**1**	13	**5**	2	**Ret**	Ret	Ret	7	5	5	1	7	5	1	5	3	3	Ret	1	3	14	8	303
3	(France) DAMS	6	11	10	5	3	14	8	9	8	7	8	11	8	17	16	Ret	16	8	1	5	4	2	Ret	Ret	15	303
4	(Russia) Russian Time	1	3	1	Ret	Ret	8	9	1	4	14	14†	8	1	6	4	8	13	6	5	2	2	11	5	2	7	234
4	(Russia) Russian Time	2	19	17	9	9	9	Ret	14†	Ret	8	Ret	7	6	12	11	9	12	12	11	1	14	10	11	9	Ret	234
5	(Italy) Pertamina Prema Theodore Racing (1–7) (Italy) Pertamina Prema Racing (8–12)	3	7	16	10	Ret	Ret	6	2	Ret	Ret	18	13	Ret	Ret	15	13	11	16	Ret	11	Ret	DNS	12	17	Ret	231
5	(Italy) Pertamina Prema Theodore Racing (1–7) (Italy) Pertamina Prema Racing (8–12)	4	6	5	Ret	2	2	Ret	Ret	9	5	1	Ret	14	7	6	1	7	**1**	4	9	17	**3**	4	4	5	231
6	(Czech Republic) Charouz Racing System	20	13	9	Ret	10	Ret	10	4	2	6	2	Ret	Ret	4	5	17	9	18	13	13	11	12	13	6	6	215
6	(Czech Republic) Charouz Racing System	21	17	12	3	DNS	10	7	8	1	4	4	3	4	3	Ret	3	17	17	19	DSQ	10	6	9	7	1	215
7	(Spain) Campos Vexatec Racing	14	12	6	Ret	14	4	5	Ret	10	3	3	12	13	5	10	6	2	7	6	10	6	Ret	14	3	9	132
7	(Spain) Campos Vexatec Racing	15	16	15	Ret	Ret	12	14	12	Ret	15	10	Ret	17	15	14	15	15	10	14	16	15	9	6	8	3	132
8	(Netherlands) MP Motorsport	9	DNS	11	8	7	13	Ret	3	7	DSQ	15	4	16	11	9	11	5	15	18	Ret	7	13	8	12	11	61
8	(Netherlands) MP Motorsport	10	10	7	7	8	Ret	Ret	Ret	Ret	Ret	16	Ret	15	9	8	18	Ret	Ret	12	8	Ret	Ret	Ret	15	Ret	61
9	(United Kingdom) BWT Arden	11	8	2	Ret	15†	Ret	12	11	6	12	11	15	12	8	1	16	Ret	9	16	12	16	16†	10	11	Ret	58
9	(United Kingdom) BWT Arden	12	18	8	13	12	11	Ret	10	11†	9	12	9	9	Ret	DNS	10	6	Ret	17	14	13	8	7	Ret	12	58
10	(Italy) Trident	16	15	14	Ret	5	Ret	13	5	5	10	13	14	10	14	13	12	14	14	8	Ret	9	15	15	Ret	DNS	37
10	(Italy) Trident	17	14	20	11	6	DNS	11	13	12†	13	9	10	7	16	DSQ	14	Ret	13	15	15	12	7	Ret	13	14	37
Pos.	Team	No.	FR	SR	FR	SR	FR	SR	FR	SR	FR	SR	FR	SR	FR	SR	FR	SR	FR	SR	FR	SR	FR	SR	FR	SR	Points
Pos.	Team	No.	BHR (Bahrain)		BAK (Azerbaijan)		CAT (Spain)		MCO (Monaco)		LEC (France)		RBR (Austria)		SIL (United Kingdom)		HUN (Hungary)		SPA (Belgium)		MNZ (Italy)		SOC (Russia)		YMC (United Arab Emirates)		Points

Notes:

- † – Drivers did not finish the race, but were classified as they completed more than 90% of the race distance.
