= Mecachrome V8108 GP2 V8 =

Mecachrome GP2 V8

Overview
- Manufacturer: (France) Mecachrome (under a support from Teos Engineering)
- Production: 2005–2017

Layout
- Configuration: V8, naturally-aspirated, 90° cylinder angle
- Displacement: 4.0 L (244 cu in)
- Cylinder bore: Undisclosed
- Cylinder block material: Aluminum alloy
- Cylinder head material: Aluminum alloy
- Valvetrain: 32-valve, DOHC, four-valves per cylinder

Combustion
- Turbocharger: No
- Fuel system: Electronic indirect fuel injection
- Management: Magneti Marelli Marvel 8 ECU/GCU including data logging system
- Fuel type: Elf LMS 101.6 RON unleaded gasoline
- Oil system: Dry sump

Output
- Power output: 612 hp (456 kW)
- Torque output: 500 N⋅m (369 ft⋅lbf)

Dimensions
- Dry weight: 326 lb (148 kg)

Chronology
- Successor: Mecachrome V634

The Mecachrome GP2 V8 (also known as Mecachrome V8108) engine is a 4.0-litre, naturally-aspirated, V8 racing engine, developed and produced by Mecachrome for the GP2 Series (2005–2016), and later the FIA Formula 2 Championship (2017). Mecachrome GP2 V8 was the sole FIA Formula 2 Championship engine manufactured from 2005 to 2017, before being replaced by the Mecachrome Formula 2 V6 for the following season. The Mecachrome GP2 V8 was built in late-2002 and later completed and assembled at Mecachrome, power assembly plant in Aubigny-sur-Nère, France in late 2004. The Mecachrome GP2 V8 was the sole engine allowed in the GP2 series at the time.

Between 2005–2010, Mecachrome engines were badged as "Renault".

== Statistics ==
GP2 Series
First entry	Last entry	Races entered	Chassis	CC	DC	Race victories	Podiums	Points	Pole positions	Fastest laps
2005 Imola GP2 Series round	2016 Yas Marina GP2 Series round		GP2/05; GP2/08; GP2/11							
FIA Formula 2 Championship
2017 Sakhir Formula 2 round	2017 Yas Island Formula 2 round	22	GP2/11	1	1	22			11	22

== Applications ==
- Dallara GP2/05
- Dallara GP2/08
- Dallara GP2/11
