= Dallara F2 2018 =

Open-wheel racing car

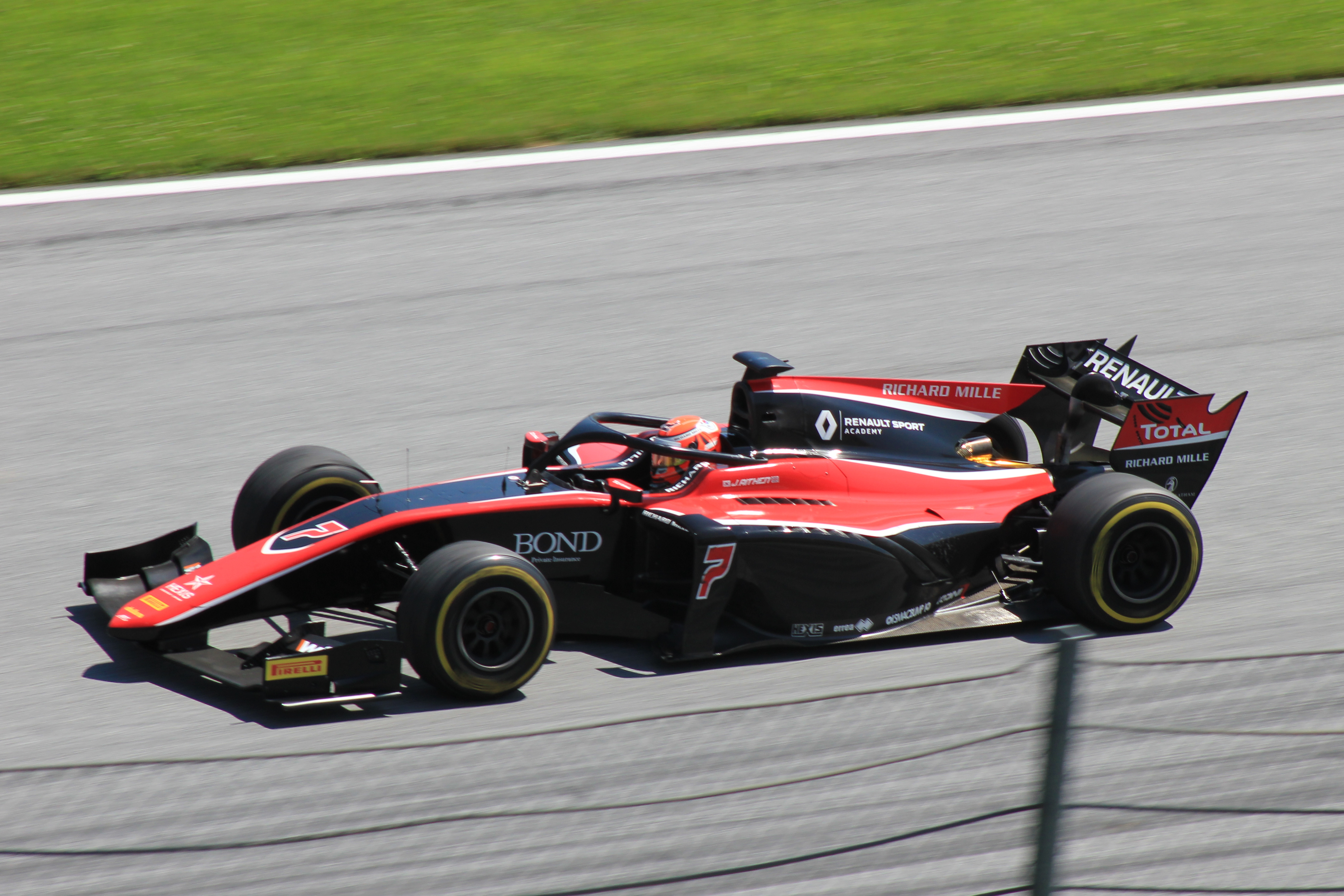
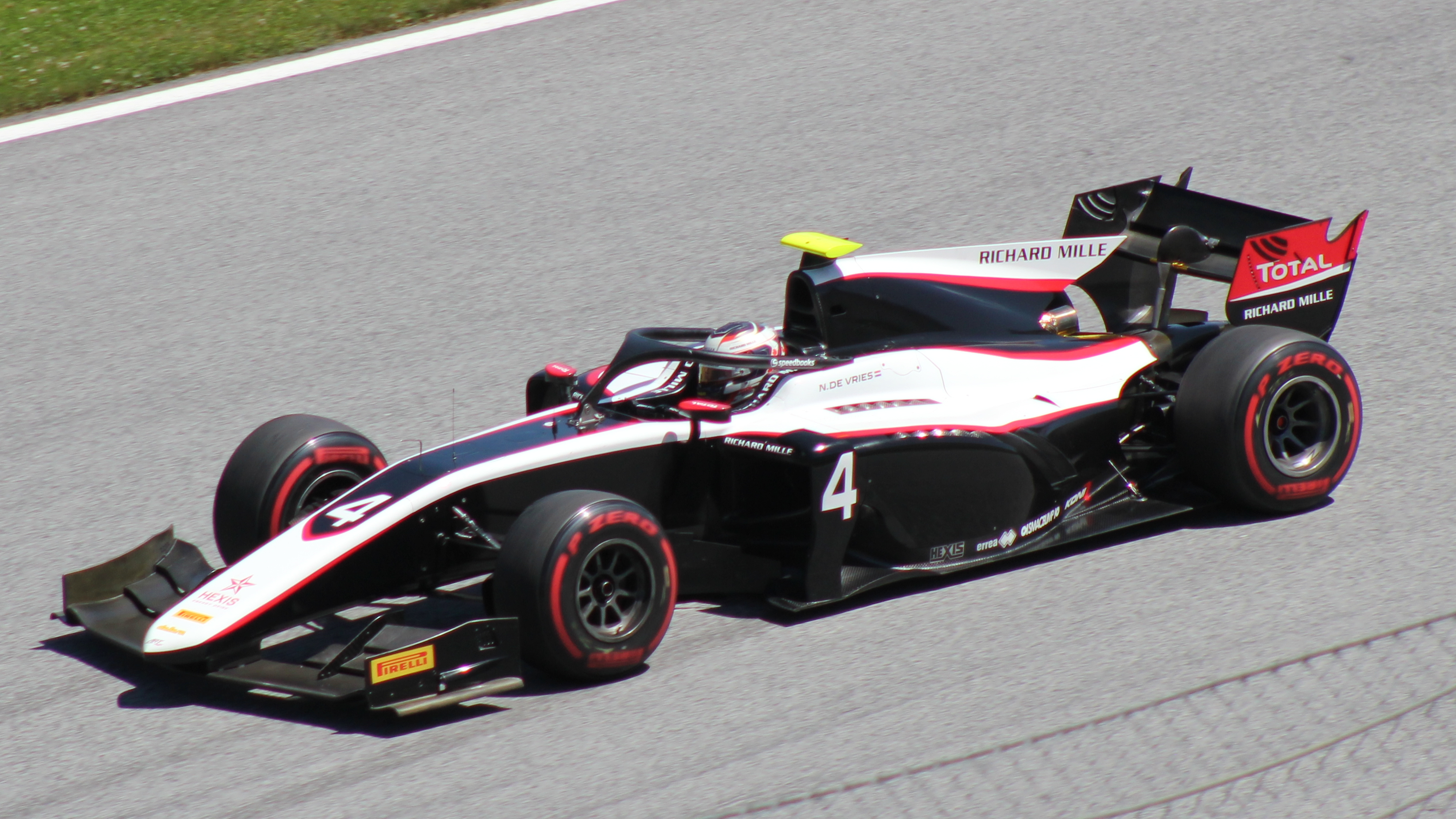
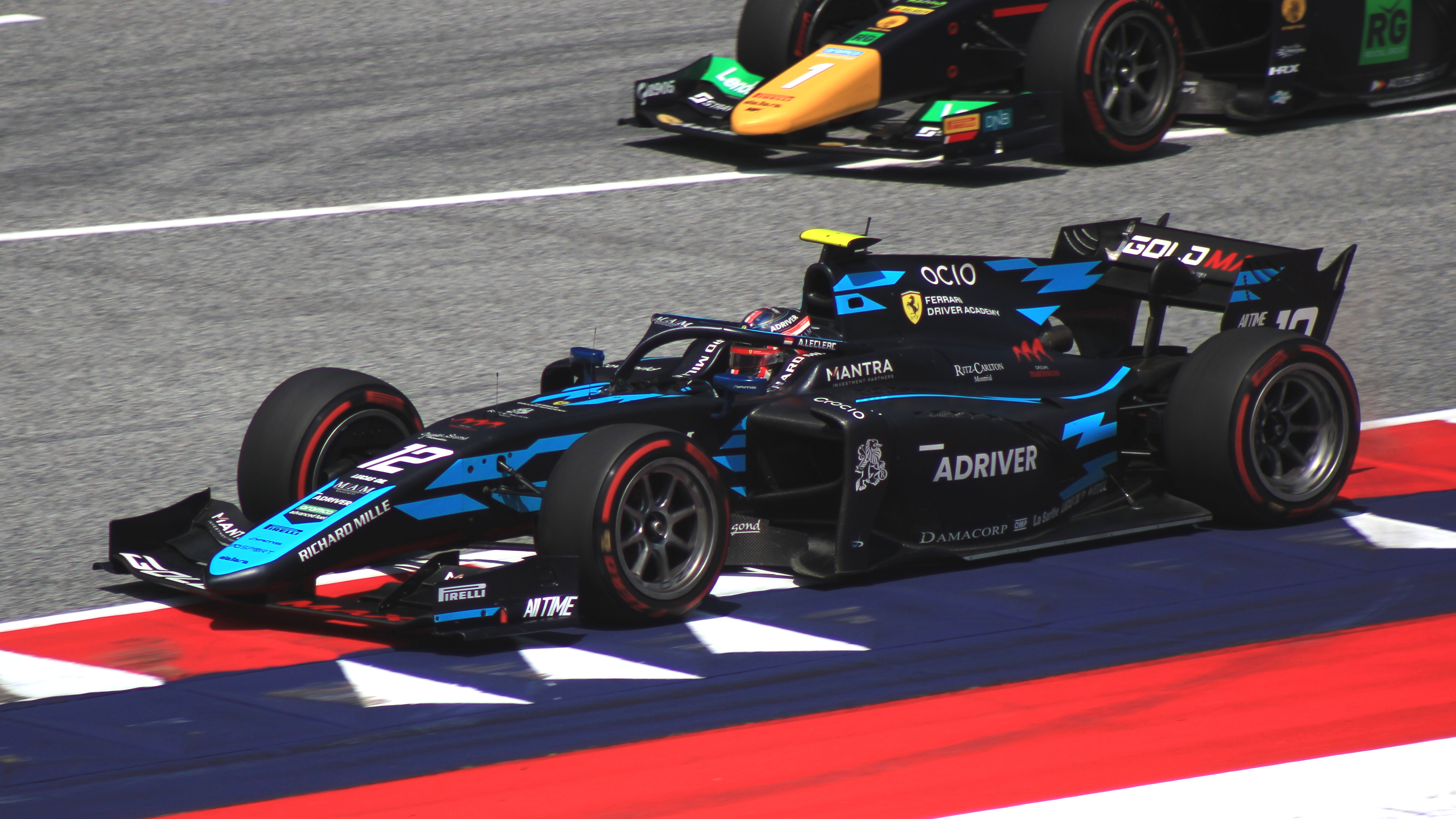
- Jack Aitken driving an F2 2018 at the 2018 Spielberg Formula 2 round (top); Nyck de Vries driving an F2 2018 at the 2019 Spielberg Formula 2 round (center); Arthur Leclerc driving an F2 2018 at the 2023 Spielberg Formula 2 round (bottom)
- Category: FIA Formula 2
- Constructor: Dallara
- Designer: Luca Pignacca
- Predecessor: Dallara GP2/11
- Successor: Dallara F2 2024

Technical specifications
- Chassis: Sandwich aluminum/carbon fibre monocoque with honeycomb structure and survival cell
- Suspension (front): Pushrod operated double steel wishbones with twin Koni dampers and torsion bars suspension
- Suspension (rear): Pushrod operated double steel wishbones with twin Koni dampers and spring suspension
- Length: 5,224 mm (206 in)
- Width: 1,900 mm (75 in)
- Height: 1,097 mm (43 in)
- Wheelbase: 3,135 mm (123 in)
- Engine: Mecachrome V634T 3.4 litres (207 cubic inches) V6 engine with 95° cylinder bank with 4-stroke piston Otto cycle single-turbocharged, longitudinally mounted in a rear-engined, rear-wheel drive layout
- Transmission: Hewland LFSC-200 6-speed + 1 reverse sequential semi-automatic paddle-shift with limited-slip differential
- Battery: Magneti Marelli MMYX9 12 volts lithium battery
- Power: 620 hp (462 kW) @ 8,750 rpm, 583 N⋅m (430 ft⋅lbf) torque
- Weight: 720 kg (1,587 lb) including driver and fuel
- Fuel: Elf LMS 89.6 MON, 101.6 RON unleaded (2018-2022) later Aramco Advanced 55% sustainable fuel (2023)
- Lubricants: Elf HTX 840 (2019-2022) later Aramco Orizon (2023)
- Brakes: Carbone Industrie carbon brake discs with Brembo six-piston calipers and pads
- Tyres: Pirelli P Zero dry slick and Pirelli Cinturato treaded wet tyres O.Z. Racing 12 in × 13 in (305 mm × 330 mm) (2018-2019) later 12 in × 18 in (305 mm × 457 mm) (2020-2023) (front); 13.7 in × 13 in (348 mm × 330 mm) (2018-2019) later 13.7 in × 18 in (348 mm × 457 mm) (2020-2023) (rear) standard aluminum wheel rims
- Clutch: ZF Sachs carbon clutch

Competition history
- Debut: 2018 Sakhir Formula 2 round
- Last event: 2023 Yas Island Formula 2 round
Races	Wins	Poles	F/Laps
169	169	71	169
- Teams' Championships: Carlin (2018); DAMS (2019); Prema Racing (2020, 2021); MP Motorsport (2022); ART Grand Prix (2023)
- Drivers' Championships: George Russell (2018); Nyck de Vries (2019); Mick Schumacher (2020); Oscar Piastri (2021); Felipe Drugovich (2022); Théo Pourchaire (2023)

The Dallara F2 2018 (originally known as the Dallara F2/18) was an open-wheel racing car developed by Italian manufacturer Dallara for use in the FIA Formula 2 Championship, a feeder-series for Formula One until being replaced by the Dallara F2 2024 from the 2024 season onwards. The F2 2018 was the second car used by the FIA Formula 2 Championship and was introduced for the 2018 championship as a replacement for the aging Dallara GP2/11 chassis. As the Formula 2 Championship is a spec series, the F2 2018 was raced by every team and driver competing in the series as a cost-control method. The F2 2018 was Dallara's first ever turbo-powered Formula 2 car and also the first turbo-powered Formula 1 junior feeder-series car since the Dallara GP3/10 in the GP3 Series. The F2 2018 was also the longest-serving Dallara chassis in Formula 2 era to date.

== Design ==
=== History ===
Dallara began the development, design, and construction of the F2/18 chassis in late 2015. Originally the GP2/18 or F2/18 was supposed to debut in Formula 2 from 2017 season onwards but delayed to 2018 season due to economic reasons. The first F2/18 chassis was assembled in May 2017, with the first vehicle completed in early July 2017. The Dallara F2/18 was given a private shakedown in mid-July 2017 at Circuit de Nevers Magny-Cours. Codenamed F2/18 it was intended to see its first race in the 2018 season. During the teaser of unveiling on Formula 2's Instagram, Twitter and Facebook accounts, Dallara decided to rename the F2/18 as F2 2018 in a reference for the new car naming year. Replacing the successful Dallara GP2/11 which had been raced since 2011 GP2 Series season, the F2 2018 had large shoes to fill. Built by Dallara at Dallara's main factory plant headquarters in Varano de' Melegari, Parma, Italy. On 27 August 2017 it was announced that the car would incorporate the Halo cockpit protection device for the 2018 season and beyond. The completed Dallara F2 2018 car was revealed during the race weekend at Monza round on 31 August 2017.

=== Chassis construction and aerodynamics ===
The design of the car incorporates a lower nose, wider and lower rear wing, and a wider and curved front wing compared with the Dallara GP2/11 as the series adopts regulations more aesthetically in line with Formula One. The "shark fin" engine cover—a carbon fibre panel extending backwards from the engine cowling—was retained but its profile was lowered. While most of the car's mechanical parts were developed specifically for the F2 2018, the car continued to use the same tyres, fuel tank and brakes as the GP2/11.

The design also features the "halo" cockpit protection device, a wishbone-shaped frame mounted to the monocoque designed to deflect debris away from a driver's head in the event of an accident.

The car's rear wing still incorporates the drag reduction system (DRS) rear wing flap, for the purpose of improving overtaking maneuver assist.

=== Engine package ===
The F2 2018 features a brand-new engine package built specifically for the car. The aging Mecachrome V8108 4.0 L (244 cu in) V8 naturally-aspirated port electronic indirect-injected engine—which had been used since the inaugural 2005 season of the GP2 Series—was replaced by a fuel-efficient 3.4 L (207 cu in) V6 turbocharged direct-injected engine developed by Mecachrome Motorsport (V634 Turbo model). During the car's shakedown and preliminary testing phase at the Circuit de Nevers Magny-Cours, drivers noted that the change from natural aspiration to a turbocharger meant that the F2 2018 required a different driving style to its predecessor, the GP2/11, as the turbocharger produced more torque and thus required the driver to exercise greater control over the throttle.

Van Der Lee Turbo Systems currently supplies turbocharger kits for all Mecachrome V634T engines.

=== Tyres ===
Pirelli would remain as preferred official tyre partner and supplier of FIA Formula 2 Championship from 2018 season onwards. The tyre sizes and layouts were carried over from pre-F1 2017 designs and thus kept the traditional 13-inch wheel rims. The hard tyre compound of Pirelli P Zero FIA Formula 2 Championship was recoloured from orange to ice blue in a reference of 2018 Formula One tyre regulations. From 2020, the car used 18-inch wheels to allow Pirelli to gather data on how the larger tyres would work.

=== Further development ===
The F2 2018 went through a development programme after its début, with the car's launch control being the initial focus. The software of the electronic control unit was rewritten, introducing a new throttle map in a bid to prevent the car from stalling. The issue was attributed to difficulty in finding the bite point, or the point where the clutch engaged with the driveline to launch the car. Further updates were introduced to the car in June 2018 that were aimed at improving reliability and making the car easier to start.

=== F1 movie ===
The F2 2018 was modified by Mercedes Applied Science for use in filming the F1 movie. Formula One-style bodywork was created and the chassis was widened and lengthened with spacers in an attempt to mimic the 2022-era F1 cars.

== Controversies ==
The car gained a reputation as being difficult to drive as the turbocharged engine required a more delicate touch on the throttle than the GP2/11. The opening five rounds of the 2018 championship saw several drivers stalling on the starting grid, prompting criticism of the design, led by drivers Artem Markelov, Lando Norris and George Russell. The FIA—the governing body of motorsport—also expressed concerns, with race director Charlie Whiting regularly examining the system. With no apparent solution to the problems, Norris expressed concerns that the stalling issue would ultimately settle the drivers' championship title, while Arjun Maini suggested that it was causing irreparable damage to their careers. Further criticism was also directed at reliability issues that prevented drivers from starting races. Series organiser Bruno Michel acknowledged that the car had too many problems at its launch, but argued that the introduction of the F2 2018 was necessary in light of the obsolete GP2/11 chassis, a view shared by team principals. The series introduced rolling starts as a temporary solution to the problem. The changes were introduced as the 2018 calendar featured three rounds over three consecutive weeks, making the introduction of a lasting solution difficult. Drivers expressed disappointment with the decision to use rolling starts, but also noted its necessity on safety grounds. A start-line accident in a Formula 3 race saw Ameya Vaidyanathan, starting from the eleventh row of the grid, crash into the stationary car of Dan Ticktum after Ticktum stalled, prompting concerns of a similar accident happening in Formula 2. A similar accident happened at the final round of the season in Abu Dhabi when Nicholas Latifi stalled on the grid and Arjun Maini was unable to avoid hitting him. Both drivers escaped unhurt.

=== Fatal accident ===
The F2 2018 was the first and only Dallara GP2/F2 chassis to suffer a fatality to date, when a crash at the 2019 Spa-Francorchamps feature race claimed Anthoine Hubert's life.

== BOSS GP ==
After the F2 2018 was replaced in 2024 it was entered in the 2025 BOSS GP Series by 18 year old Italian Max Cuccarese in the Formula Pro category where it currently races alongside its predecessor the Dallara GP2/11 and the Dallara - World Series V8 T12 used for the Formula Renault V8 3.5 series.

== See also ==
- Dallara F2 2024
