= Dallara GP2 cars =

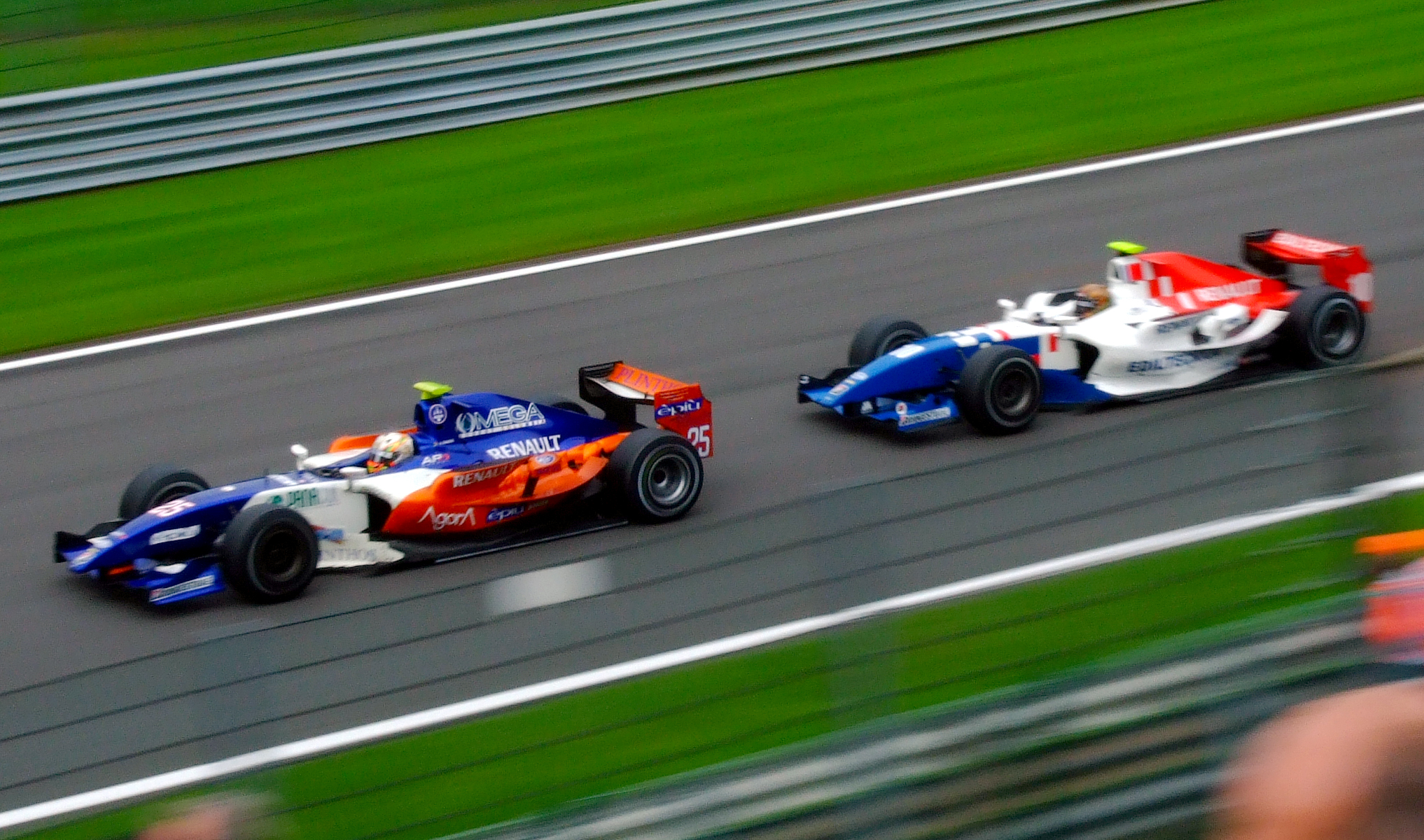
Adrian Zaugg leads Davide Valsecchi in Dallara GP2/08 cars at Circuit de Spa-Francorchamps in the 2010 GP2 Series.

The Dallara GP2 cars are a set of racing cars developed by Italian manufacturer Dallara for use in the GP2 Series, a feeder series for Formula One.

After twelve years of service, the GP2 cars were retired in 2017 and succeeded by the Dallara F2 cars, following Liberty Media's acquisition of the GP2 Series and subsequent rebrand into the FIA Formula 2 Championship.

== GP2/05 ==
Dallara GP2/05
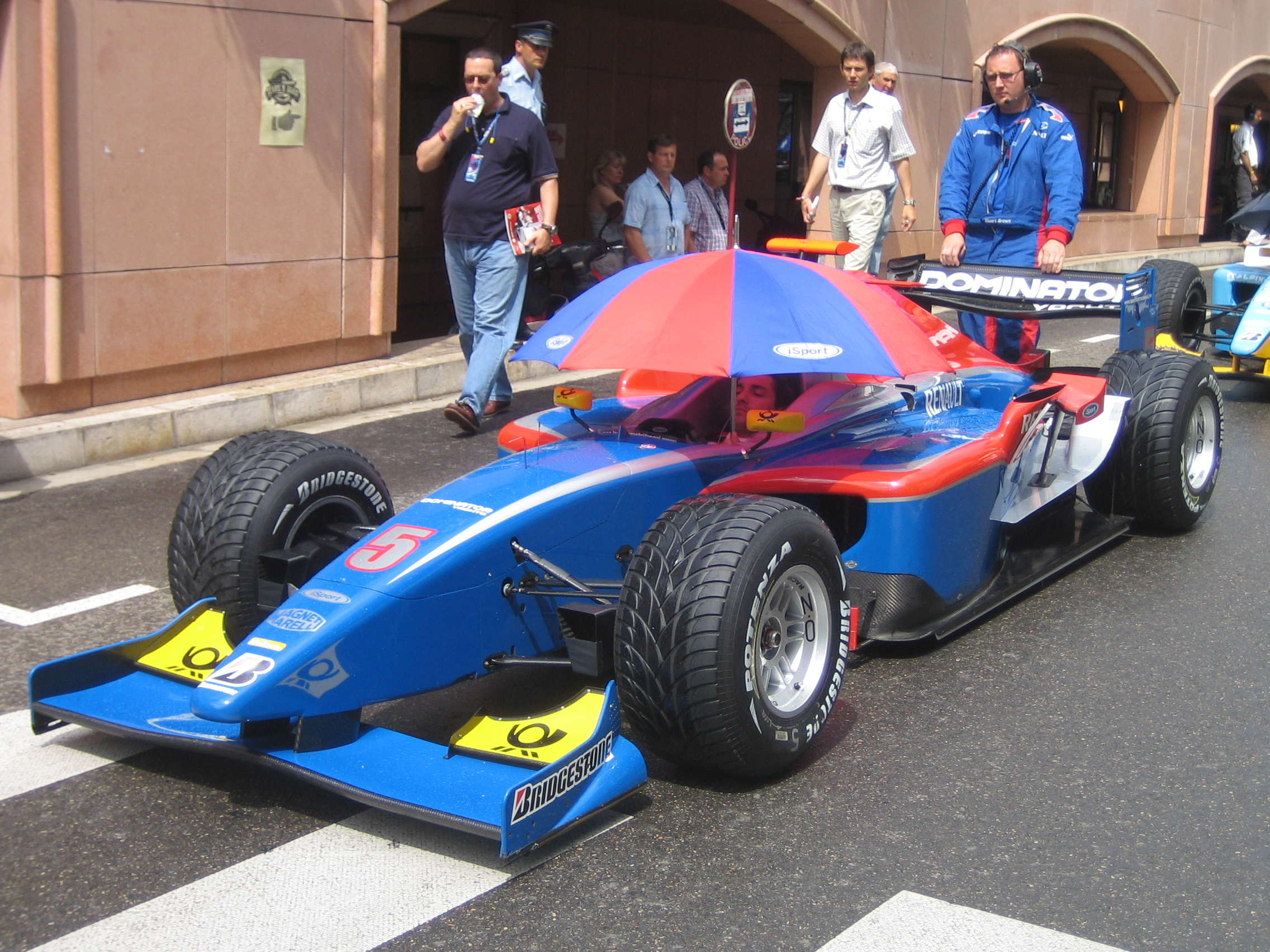
- Timo Glock's 2007-spec Dallara GP2/05 chassis at 2007 Monaco GP2 Series round.
- Category: GP2 Series (2005–2007); GP2 Asia Series (2008–2010)
- Constructor: Dallara
- Designer: Giampaolo Dallara
- Predecessor: Lola B02/50
- Successor: Dallara GP2/08

Technical specifications
- Chassis: Sandwich carbon/aluminium honeycomb monocoque
- Suspension (front): Double-steel wishbones, pushrod-operated, twin-dampers and torsion bars suspension
- Suspension (rear): Spring Suspension
- Engine: Renault-Badged Mecachrome V8108 4.0 litres (244 cubic inches) V8 90° naturally-aspirated, mid-engined, longitudinally-mounted
- Torque: 500 newton-metres (370 pound force-feet)
- Transmission: Hewland 6-speed + 1 reverse sequential semi-automatic
- Power: 612 brake horsepower (456 kilowatts; 620 metric horsepower) @ 10,000 rpm
- Weight: 585 kilograms (1,290 pounds)
- Fuel: Elf LMS 89.6 MON, 101.6 RON unleaded
- Lubricants: Elf HTX 840
- Brakes: Hitco carbon brake discs with Brembo 6-piston calipers and pads
- Tyres: Bridgestone Potenza (dry and wet); O.Z. racing wheels

Competition history
- Debut: 2005 Imola GP2 Series round
- Last event: 2010 2nd Bahrain GP2 Asia Series round

The Dallara GP2/05 is an open-wheel formula racing car, developed by Italian chassis manufacturer Dallara, for use in the GP2 Series, a feeder series for Formula One. The GP2/05 was the first 1st-generation car used by the GP2 Series. The GP2/05 was used from 2005 to 2007, in keeping with the series philosophy of introducing a chassis every three years. As the GP2 Series is a spec-formula, the car was utilised by all teams and drivers in the championship.

=== History ===
The car had its initial shakedown at the Circuit Paul Ricard on 16 July 2004 by Franck Montagny. Another test was held on the Barcelona circuit in November 2004. The old Formula 3000 cars, the Lola B02/50, also participated in the test. The times of the two different types of cars were similar, but this was due to an accident in the first laps, which forced Montagny to limit the use of the car. The first collective test was held between 23 and 25 February 2005, again on the Paul Ricard Circuit.

==== Chassis ====
Made by Dallara, the chassis is a carbon fibre monocoque built to the safety standards of the Formula One governing body, the FIA. The chassis features a ground effect which makes racing more intense and maximises overtaking possibilities. The 2006 GP2 car featured a biplane rear wing, with the triplane rear wing used in 2005 only to be used at the Monaco race. The front upper and lower wishbones were reinforced, as were the front and rear suspension uprights. The car was updated for the 2007 season, without however providing for the installation of the push to pass button, tested in 2006.

==== Engine ====
The 2005 season engine is a 580 bhp Renault V8 engine, meaning that the power of the GP2 car is not too far off that of its Formula One counterpart. Pre-season tests show that the engine can, over one lap, be within a few seconds of the engine used by the Renault F1 team. The engine also features fly-by-wire throttle mechanisms, and to reduce costs and any advantage to the wealthier teams, can only be rebuilt after it has been used for over 4,000 kilometres of racing. The 2006 4 litre V8 engine featured internal, cartographic and software upgrades designed to improve performance and fuel consumption.

==== Gearbox ====
The GP2 gear box is of the six speed, semi-automatic type. The gears themselves are changed via F1-style shift paddles on the wheel, as opposed to being changed with a traditional gear stick. The gear box, like the engine, is not too far off its F1 counterpart. The 2006 gearbox was manufactured by GearTek, and featured an 8 position barrel, with ratchet body and software upgrades, as well as a new transverse shafts fixing system designed to facilitate improved gear selection.

==== Tyres ====
Bridgestone would become the preferred official tyre partner and supplier. The 2005 season was the only one in which GP2 used grooved tires like F1 cars instead of slicks.

==== Other Parts ====
The exhaust on the car uses the latest 8-in-1 technology, whilst the brake discs are made from high-quality carbon so that they won't wear quickly, as well as to meet strict FIA safety regulations. The car's electronics are designed and supplied by popular F1 manufacturer Magneti Marelli. The 2006 Brembo supplied a new development of monobloc brake calipers and disc bells, which were exclusive to GP2. The car also featured internal cooling upgrades, a new water radiator, radiator duct, oil and water heat exchanger, modified oil degasser, new oil and water pipes and new heat exchanger fixing brackets.

The car features hardly any aids, with traction control, launch control and automatic gear shifting not included.

==== Performance ====
According to research and pre-season stability tests, the 2005 model can go 0 to 200 km/h in 6.70 seconds. The car has a top speed of 320 km/h meaning it is the fastest single seater racing car, bar the Formula One models it is based on, out of the European racing series. The cars are predicted to be reliable and are within less than five seconds per lap of the typical Formula One car.

=== Controversies ===
In the opening race at 2005 Imola, there were a number of mechanical problems and with organisers afraid of trouble at the start, the rolling start was used in both races despite the weather being dry. At Catalunya, the drivers could finally experience standing starts. At 2006 Imola the Durango team was in hot water for breaking the rules by making their own parts rather than using Dallara's technical equipment the problem was only the skirts of the car. Two Durango entries of Lucas di Grassi and Sergio Hernández had been banned from competing in the 2006 Silverstone Sprint, after both were found to have illegal repairs made to their rear wings, one of which had caused di Grassi's wing to fail in the Feature.

== GP2/08 ==
Dallara GP2/08
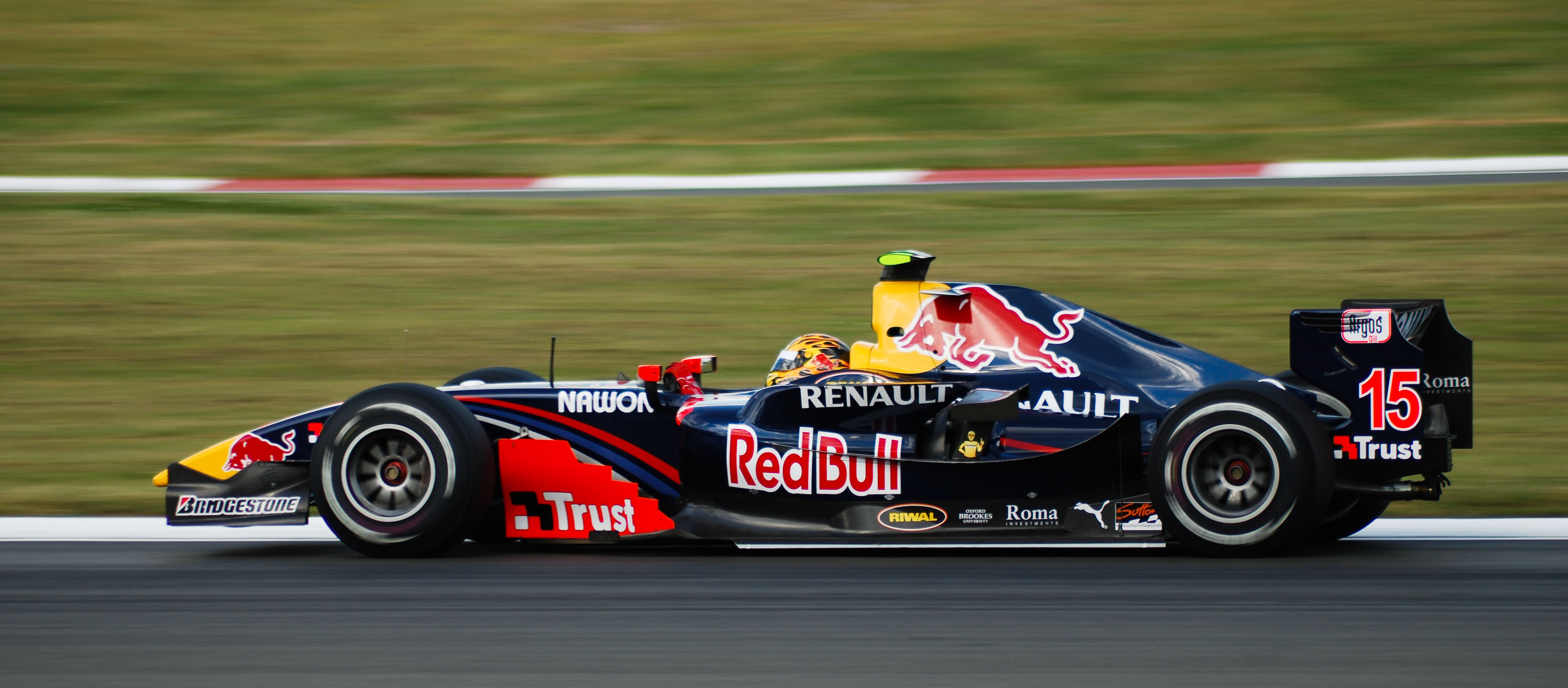
- Yelmer Buurman at the 2008 GP2 Silverstone Round
- Category: GP2 Series (2008–2010)
- Constructor: Dallara
- Designer: Giampaolo Dallara
- Predecessor: Dallara GP2/05
- Successor: Dallara GP2/11

Technical specifications
- Chassis: Sandwich carbon/aluminium honeycomb monocoque
- Suspension (front): Double-steel wishbones, pushrod-operated, twin-dampers and torsion bars suspension
- Suspension (rear): Spring Suspension
- Length: 4,867 mm (192 in)
- Width: 1,805 mm (71 in)
- Height: 1,047 mm (41 in) including FOM roll hoop camera
- Wheelbase: 3,120 mm (123 in)
- Engine: Renault Badged Mecachrome V8108 4.0 litres (244 cubic inches) V8 90° naturally-aspirated, rear-engined, longitudinally-mounted
- Torque: 500–520 newton-metres (370–380 pound force-feet)
- Transmission: Hewland 6-speed + 1 reverse sequential semi-automatic
- Power: 612–620 brake horsepower (456–462 kilowatts; 620–629 metric horsepower) @ 10,000 rpm
- Weight: 688 kg (1,517 lb)
- Fuel: Elf LMS 89.6 MON, 101.6 RON unleaded
- Lubricants: Elf HTX 840
- Brakes: Hitco carbon brake discs with Brembo 6-piston calipers and pads
- Tyres: Bridgestone Potenza (dry and wet); O.Z. racing wheels

Competition history
- Notable entrants: All GP2 Teams
- Notable drivers: All GP2 Series Drivers
- Debut: 2008 Catalunya GP2 round
- Last event: 2010 Yas Marina GP2 round
Races	Wins	Poles	F/Laps
60	60	30	60
- Constructors' Championships: Campos Racing (2008); ART Grand Prix (2009); Rapax (2010)
- Drivers' Championships: Giorgio Pantano (2008); Nico Hülkenberg (2009); Pastor Maldonado (2010)

The Dallara GP2/08 was an open-wheel formula racing car developed by Italian manufacturer Dallara for use in the GP2 Series, a feeder series for Formula One. The GP2/08 was the 2nd-generation car used by the GP2 Series, replacing the GP2/05, which had also been developed by Dallara. The GP2/08 was used from 2008 to 2010, in keeping with the series philosophy of introducing a chassis every 3 years. As the GP2 Series was a spec-formula, the car was utilised by all teams and drivers in the championship.

Between 2019 and 2025, a Dallara GP2/08 in Ferrari livery was allegedly seen several times being driven illegally on Czech motorways.

=== Development ===
Planning and design of the car began in September 2006, with GP2 series Technical Director Didier Perrin laying down the initial design parameters, prior to handing over the detailed design work to Dallara, with it being decided relatively earlier that the partnerships from the first three years of GP2 would be continued until at least 2010, with a chassis by Dallara, Renault branded engine and gearbox by Mecachrome and tyres by Bridgestone. The car was also designed to be upgradable, with an upgrade kit to be issued each year, to keep up with changes in Formula 1.

The car featured a new and 'aggressively low' nose, alongside a single keel suspension and a sculpted front wing. The car had re-designed sidepods, the which were result of a new radiator and cooling set-up. The barge-boards are also noticeably different, being far larger and more sculpted than their predecessor. The rear end was also completely redesigned, with the contoured engine cover fitting over the Mecachrome-built V8 being far tighter than before, and while the rear of the sidepods featured both brand new cooling chimneys and a newer design of the 'shark gill' vents which appeared briefly in 2006. The rear point of the engine cover pulls down to a markedly different, and far neater, exhaust assembly, while the rear wing is a brand new development of that seen in 2007 The car also came with anti intrusion panels, and was designed to meet F1 crash test standards of the time, being the only non-F1 car to pass the 2007 Formula One Crash test.

The car had its initial shakedown at the Paul Ricard High Speed Test Track on 26 June 2007 by Nelson Piquet Jr., who was the runner-up in the previous season, completing 60 laps without any problems. The car was also launched on that day.

== GP2/11 ==
Dallara GP2/11
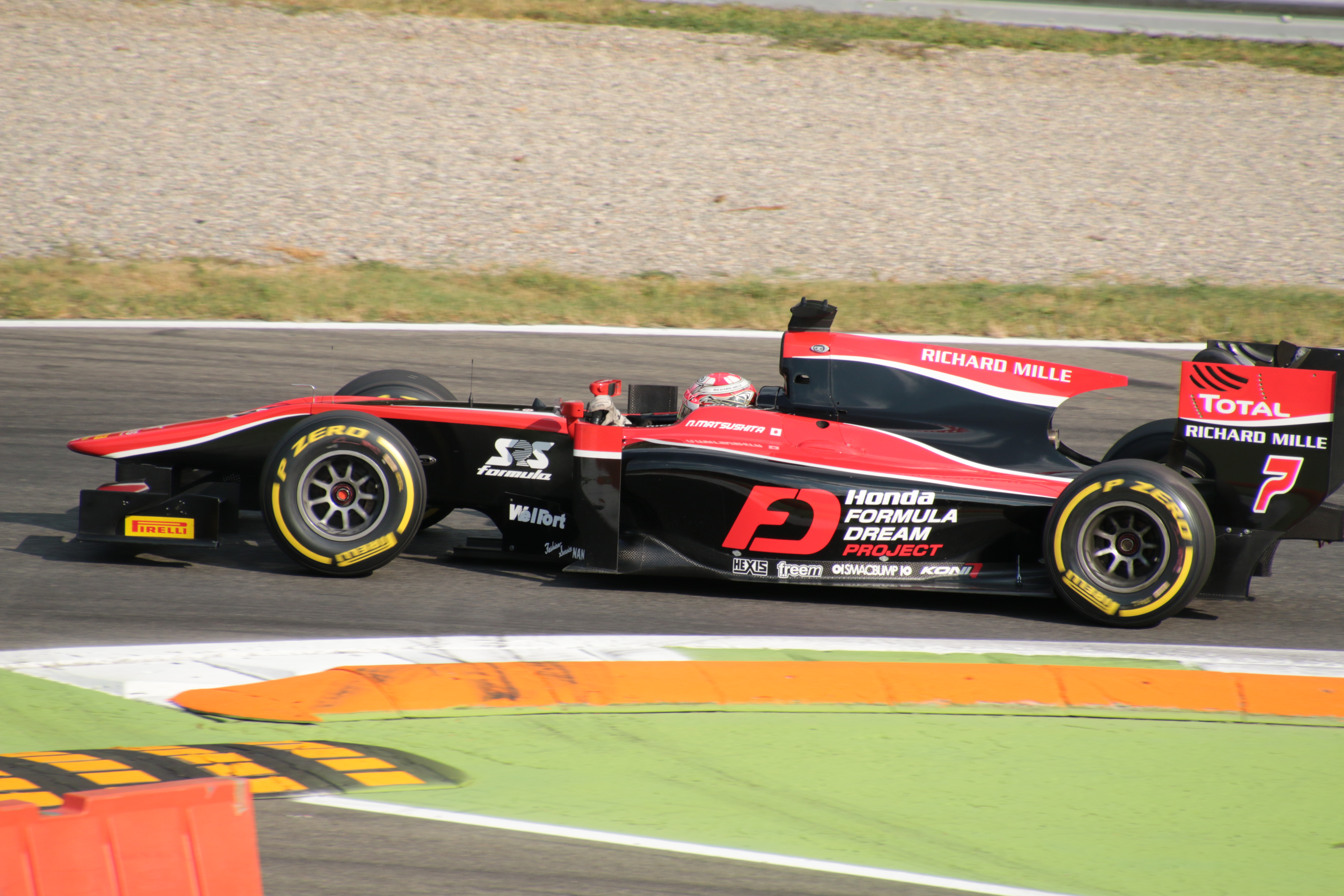
- Nobuharu Matsushita driving a GP2/11 at the Monza Eni Circuit in 2017.
- Category: FIA Formula 2 (2017); GP2 Series (2011–2016); GP2 Asia Series (2011)
- Constructor: Dallara
- Designers: Luca Pignacca; Andrea Toso
- Predecessor: Dallara GP2/08
- Successor: Dallara F2 2018

Technical specifications
- Chassis: Sandwich aluminum/carbon fibre monocoque with honeycomb structure and survival cell
- Suspension (front): Double steel wishbones, pushrod operated, twin dampers and torsion bars
- Suspension (rear): Double steel wishbones, pushrod operated, twin dampers and spring
- Length: 5,065 mm (199 in)
- Width: 1,800 mm (71 in)
- Height: 1,072 mm (42 in)
- Wheelbase: 3,120 mm (123 in)
- Engine: Mecachrome V8108 4.0 litres (244 cubic inches) V8 90° naturally aspirated, rear-engined, longitudinally mounted
- Transmission: Hewland 6-speed + 1 reverse sequential semi-automatic
- Power: 612 hp (456 kW) @ 10,000 rpm, 515 N⋅m (380 ft⋅lbf) torque
- Weight: 688 kg (1,517 lb) including driver
- Fuel: Elf LMS 89.6 MON, 101.6 RON unleaded
- Lubricants: Elf HTX 840 0W-40
- Brakes: Hitco carbon brake discs with Brembo 6-piston calipers and pads
- Tyres: Pirelli P Zero (dry), Cinturato (wet); O.Z. Racing 12 in × 13 in (305 mm × 330 mm) (front); 13.7 in × 13 in (348 mm × 330 mm) (rear) standard aluminum wheel rims

Competition history
- Debut: 2011 Yas Marina GP2 Asia round
- Last event: 2017 Yas Island Formula 2 round

The Dallara GP2/11 was a racing car developed by Italian manufacturer Dallara for use in the GP2 Series, a feeder series for Formula One. The GP2/11 is the overall third generation of car used by the GP2 Series and first generation of car used by the FIA Formula 2 Championship, and was introduced at the Yas Marina round of the 2011 season, replacing the Dallara GP2/08, which was also developed by Dallara. The GP2/11 was scheduled to be used until the end of the 2013 season, in keeping with the series' philosophy of upgrading its chassis every three years, but series organisers decided to keep it in competition for another three-year cycle in a bid to cut costs in the category. The GP2/11 was scheduled to be used until the end of the 2016 season before a next-generation car was introduced in 2017, but this was delayed again until 2018. As the GP2 Series and Formula 2 Championship are spec series, the GP2/11 was raced by every team and driver on the grid.

As of 2024, Dallara GP2/11 remains the longest-serving GP2 Series later FIA Formula 2 Championship chassis usage since 2011 to 2017 seasons.

=== Design ===
==== History ====
The Dallara GP2/11 chassis was based on 2009 Formula One aerodynamic baseline by adopting the narrower and higher rear wing, wider front wing and removal of winglets. Dallara began development, design and construction of the GP2/11 chassis in late 2009. The first chassis was assembled in July 2010, with the first chassis completed on 9 September 2010. The Dallara GP2/11 chassis replaced the Dallara GP2/08 chassis in the 2011 season. The chassis was used throughout the rest of the GP2 Series from 2011 to 2016, and for the inaugural revived 2017 FIA Formula 2 Championship.

This chassis was generally not well received as previous chassis packages due to its appearance and the fact that overtaking was much harder compared to previous cars. To combat this, DRS was introduced in the 2015 season. Another criticism of this car was that they favored drivers who had experience at GP2/F2 level for multiple years. As a result of this, only once during the GP2/11's tenure did a rookie win the drivers' title in either GP2 or Formula 2, this being Charles Leclerc in the 2017 Formula 2 Championship. No rookie managed to win the title between 2011 and 2016.

After the 2017 Abu Dhabi rounds and Abu Dhabi post-season testing of the FIA Formula 2 Championship, the chassis together with engines were permanently retired from competition and replaced with the Dallara F2 2018 chassis starting from the 2018 season. The GP2/11 still sees regular competition in the BOSS GP and MAXX Formula championships, also competing against its two GP2 predecessors as well as its replacement the Dallara F2 2018.

==== Engine package ====
The engine still carried over the same 4.0 litre (244 cu in) naturally-aspirated V8 engine developed by Mecachrome but the exhaust systems were altered by merging two exits together on the rear side.

==== Tyres ====
Pirelli would become the preferred official tyre partner and supplier of GP2 Asia Series, GP2 Series and later FIA Formula 2 Championship from 2011 until 2017 seasons. The tyre sizes and layouts were the same as Formula 1 2011-2016 designs and thus kept the traditional 13-inch wheel rims.

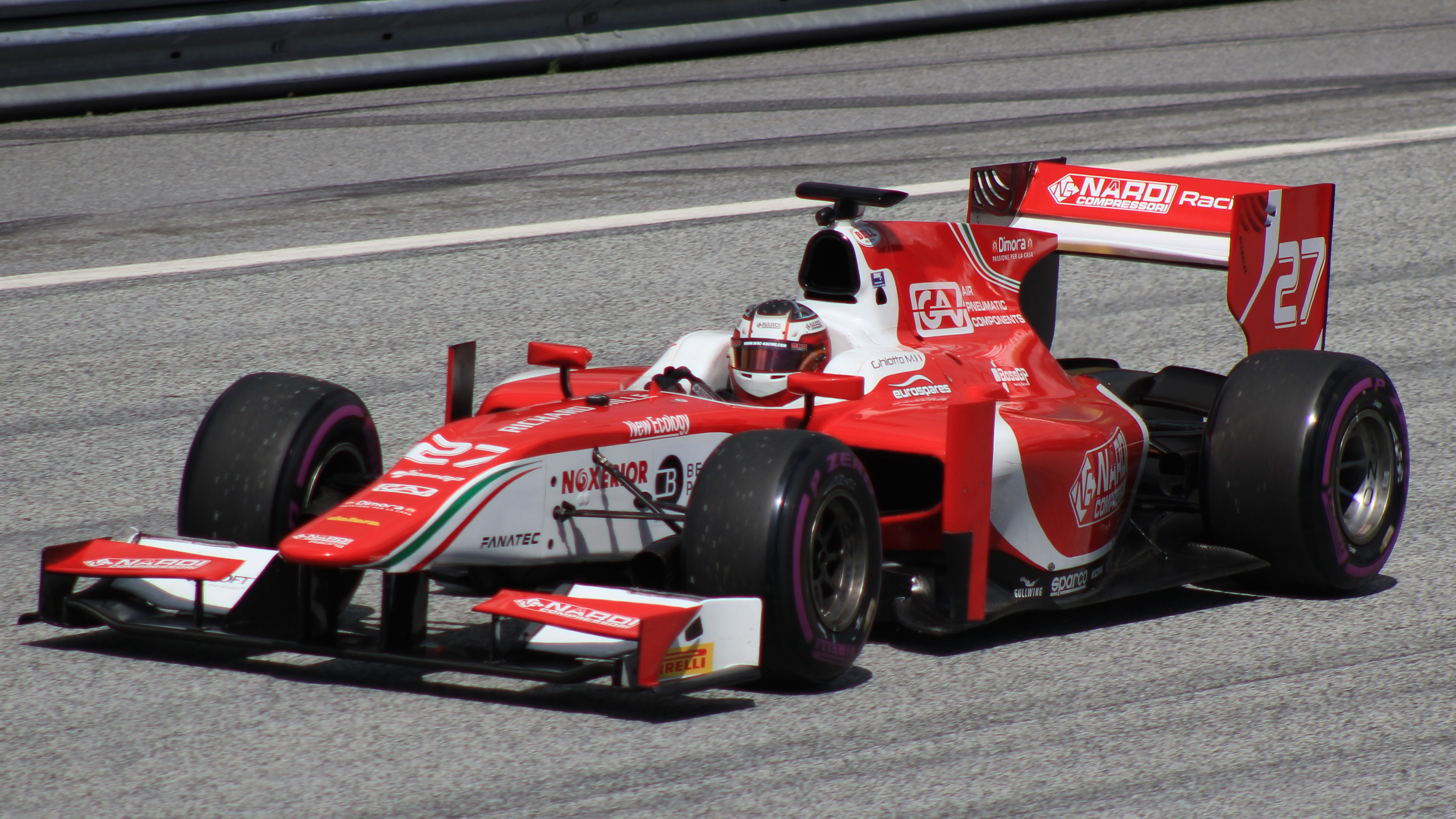
Marco Ghiotto driving the GP2/11
