= Baku Formula 2 round =

(Azerbaijan) Baku Formula 2 round

FIA Formula 2 Championship
- Venue: Baku City Circuit
- Location: Baku, Azerbaijan
- First race: 2017
- Most wins (driver): (Estonia) Jüri Vips (United Kingdom) Oliver Bearman (both 2)
- Most wins (team): (Italy) Prema Racing (5)
- Lap record: 1:53.478 ( (France) Isack Hadjar, Hitech Pulse-Eight, Dallara F2 2018, 2023)

(Azerbaijan) Baku GP2 Series round
GP2 Series
- Most wins (driver): (Italy) Antonio Giovinazzi (2)
- Most wins (team): (Italy) Prema Racing (2)
- Lap record: 1:54.792 ( (Italy) Antonio Giovinazzi, Prema Racing, Dallara GP2/11, 2016)

The Baku Formula 2 round, formerly Baku GP2 Series round, is a FIA Formula 2 Championship series race that is run on the Baku City Circuit track in Baku, Azerbaijan.

== Winners ==
A green background indicates an event which was part of the GP2 Series event.

Year	Race	Driver	Team	Report
2016	Feature	(Italy) Antonio Giovinazzi	Prema Racing	Report
2016	Sprint	(Italy) Antonio Giovinazzi	Prema Racing	Report
2017	Feature	(Monaco) Charles Leclerc	Prema Racing	Report
2017	Sprint	(France) Norman Nato	Pertamina Arden	Report
2018	Feature	(Thailand) Alexander Albon	DAMS	Report
2018	Sprint	(United Kingdom) George Russell	ART Grand Prix	Report
2019	Feature	(United Kingdom) Jack Aitken	Campos Racing	Report
2019	Sprint	(Canada) Nicholas Latifi	DAMS	Report
2021	Sprint 1	(Russia) Robert Shwartzman	Prema Racing	Report
2021	Sprint 2	(Estonia) Jüri Vips	Hitech Grand Prix	Report
2021	Feature	(Estonia) Jüri Vips	Hitech Grand Prix	Report
2022	Sprint	(Denmark) Frederik Vesti	ART Grand Prix	Report
2022	Feature	(Norway) Dennis Hauger	Prema Racing	Report
2023	Sprint	(United Kingdom) Oliver Bearman	Prema Racing	Report
2023	Feature	(United Kingdom) Oliver Bearman	Prema Racing	Report
2024	Sprint	(Netherlands) Richard Verschoor	Trident	Report
2024	Feature	(Paraguay) Joshua Dürksen	AIX Racing	Report
2025	Sprint	(Sweden) Dino Beganovic	Hitech TGR	Report
2025	Feature	(United States) Jak Crawford	DAMS Lucas Oil	Report
2026	Sprint	(Sweden) Dino Beganovic	DAMS Lucas Oil	
2026	Feature 1	(Republic of Ireland) Alex Dunne	Rodin	
2026	Feature 2	(Brazil) Rafael Camara	Invicta Racing	Report

== See also ==
- Azerbaijan Grand Prix
