= 2025 Azerbaijan Grand Prix =

Formula One motor race

Race 17 of 24 in the 2025 Formula One World Championship
| ← Previous race | Next race → |
- Layout of the Baku City Circuit

Race details
- Date: 21 September 2025
- Official name: Formula 1 Qatar Airways Azerbaijan Grand Prix 2025
- Location: Baku City Circuit; Baku, Azerbaijan
- Course: Street circuit
- Course length: 6.003 km (3.730 miles)
- Distance: 51 laps, 306.049 km (190.170 miles)
- Weather: Cloudy

Pole position
| Driver | (Netherlands) Max Verstappen | Red Bull Racing-Honda RBPT |
- Time: 1:41.117

Fastest lap
| Driver | (Netherlands) Max Verstappen | Red Bull Racing-Honda RBPT |
- Time: 1:43.388 on lap 50

Podium
| First | (Netherlands) Max Verstappen | Red Bull Racing-Honda RBPT |
| Second | (United Kingdom) George Russell | Mercedes |
| Third | (Spain) Carlos Sainz Jr. | Williams-Mercedes |

The 2025 Azerbaijan Grand Prix (officially known as the Formula 1 Qatar Airways Azerbaijan Grand Prix 2025) was a Formula One motor race held on 21 September 2025 at the Baku City Circuit in Baku, Azerbaijan. It was the seventeenth round of the 2025 Formula One World Championship.

Max Verstappen of Red Bull converted his pole position to win. It was his second Baku win and his sixth grand chelem. He was joined on the podium by George Russell of Mercedes and Carlos Sainz Jr. of Williams. Sainz scored Williams' first podium since the rain-curtailed 2021 Belgian Grand Prix and Williams' first podium from a full race distance since the 2017 Azerbaijan Grand Prix. Championship leader Oscar Piastri crashed out during the first lap, marking his first retirement since the 2023 United States Grand Prix.

Following the race, Norris reduced the gap to Piastri in the Drivers' Championship to 25 points, with Verstappen a further 44 points adrift in third McLaren extended their lead in the World Constructors' Championship to 333 points. Mercedes moved into second place with 290 points, four clear from Ferrari that dropped down to third. Red Bull remained in fourth position, 18 points behind Mercedes and out of contention to win the Constructors' title.

== Background ==
The event was held at the Baku City Circuit in Baku for the ninth time in the circuit's history, having previously held one edition of the European Grand Prix in 2016, across the weekend of 19–21 September. The Grand Prix was the seventeenth round of the 2025 Formula One World Championship and the eighth running of the Azerbaijan Grand Prix.

=== Championship standings before the race ===
Going into the weekend, Oscar Piastri led the Drivers' Championship with 324 points, 31 points ahead of teammate Lando Norris in second and 94 ahead of Max Verstappen in third. McLaren, with 617 points, led the Constructors' Championship from Ferrari and Mercedes, who were second and third with 280 and 260 points, respectively.

==== Championship permutations ====
World Constructors' Championship leader McLaren had an opportunity to secure its tenth title at this event, and the second in a row. With eight rounds remaining in the season, a maximum of 389 points could still be scored. McLaren had the opportunity to secure the title if they outscored Ferrari by nine points, and Mercedes failed to outscore McLaren by 12 points, and Red Bull Racing failed to outscore McLaren by 33 points. McLaren had the opportunity to secure the title by achieving either a 1–2 or 1–3 finish, regardless of where anyone else finished.

=== Entrants ===
The drivers and teams were the same as published in the season entry list with two exceptions; Yuki Tsunoda at Red Bull Racing was in the seat originally held by Liam Lawson before the latter was demoted back to Racing Bulls from the Japanese Grand Prix onward, and Franco Colapinto replaced Jack Doohan at Alpine from the Emilia Romagna Grand Prix onward until at least the Austrian Grand Prix on a rotating seat basis. Before the Austrian Grand Prix, it was confirmed that Colapinto would retain his seat with the team, effectively on a race-by-race basis.

=== Tyre choices ===
Tyre supplier Pirelli brought the C4, C5, and C6 tyre compounds—the softest three in their range (designated hard, medium, and soft, respectively)—for teams to use at the event.

== Practice ==
Three free practice sessions were held for the event. The first practice session was held on 19 September 2025, at 12:30 local time (UTC+4), and was topped by Lando Norris ahead of teammate Oscar Piastri and Charles Leclerc. The session was disrupted by a lengthy red flag due to debris on track. Further issues with the kerbs on turn 16 delayed the session further. The second free practice session was held on the same day, at 16:00 local time, and was topped by Lewis Hamilton ahead of teammate Leclerc and George Russell of Mercedes. The third free practice session was held on 20 September 2025, at 12:30 local time, and was topped by Norris ahead of Max Verstappen and Piastri.

== Qualifying ==
Qualifying was held on 20 September 2025, at 16:00 local time (UTC+4), and determined the starting grid order for the race.

=== Qualifying report ===
Six red flags were observed during qualifying, breaking the previous record of five red flags during a single qualification session set jointly at the 2022 Emilia Romagna Grand Prix and the 2024 São Paulo Grand Prix. Due to the stoppages, the session, scheduled to run over one hour, ran for over two hours.

During the first session, Liam Lawson of Racing Bulls topped the session before Alexander Albon crashed his Williams at turn 1, breaking his steering rack, stopping the session and disallowing Oscar Piastri a chance to do a flying lap. The session was suspended for eight minutes; shortly after it resumed, Nico Hülkenberg crashed at turn 4, breaking his front wing and inflicting heavy floor damage to his Sauber car. A ten-minute suspension followed; as the session ended, another red flag was thrown due to Pierre Gasly's Alpine going off the track at turn 4. Shortly afterward, his Alpine teammate Franco Colapinto hit the wall nearby, while Lando Norris topped the session. Kimi Antonelli had a scrappy session in the Mercedes, having his times deleted and running poorly across the track, he posted a time that was enough to get him out of the bottom five drivers, who were Colapinto, Hülkenberg, Esteban Ocon, Gasly and Albon. Ocon would be disqualified following the session due to a rear wing infringement on the Haas and started the race from last.

The start of the second session was delayed to observe track cleaning operations. Running lasted for three minutes before Oliver Bearman in the Haas hit the wall at turn 2, which led to his suspension being broken and a fourth red flag being observed. No further incidents were observed during this session, and the eliminated drivers were Fernando Alonso, Lewis Hamilton, Gabriel Bortoleto, Lance Stroll, and Bearman.

The third session was suspended after four minutes when Charles Leclerc of Ferrari found the wall at turn 15. As he had not set a time, he would start tenth. This crash ensured that Leclerc would not start on pole for the Azerbaijan Grand Prix for the first time since 2019, where he also crashed in qualifying. Carlos Sainz Jr. was on provisional pole position ahead of both Racing Bulls of Lawson and Isack Hadjar. Immediately after the session resumed, Piastri put his car in the wall at turn 3, facilitating the last red flag of the session; similarly to Leclerc, he was unable to set a time, so he started ninth. Max Verstappen took pole position ahead of Sainz and Lawson, Antonelli qualified in fourth, his highest starting position since the Canadian Grand Prix, and the first time he out-qualified teammate George Russell since the Miami Grand Prix. Norris was unable to capitalise on his teammate's error, himself making mistakes during his qualifying lap to start seventh. Sainz recorded Williams' first front row start since Russell qualified second at the 2021 Belgian Grand Prix.

=== Qualifying classification ===
| Pos. | No. | Driver | Constructor | Qualifying times | | | Final grid |
| Pos. | No. | Driver | Constructor | Q1 | Q2 | Q3 | Final grid |
|---|---|---|---|---|---|---|---|
| 1 | 1 | (Netherlands) Max Verstappen | Red Bull Racing-Honda RBPT | 1:41.331 | 1:41.255 | 1:41.117 | 1 |
| 2 | 55 | (Spain) Carlos Sainz Jr. | Williams-Mercedes | 1:42.635 | 1:41.675 | 1:41.595 | 2 |
| 3 | 30 | (New Zealand) Liam Lawson | Racing Bulls-Honda RBPT | 1:42.257 | 1:41.537 | 1:41.707 | 3 |
| 4 | 12 | (Italy) Kimi Antonelli | Mercedes | 1:42.247 | 1:41.464 | 1:41.717 | 4 |
| 5 | 63 | (United Kingdom) George Russell | Mercedes | 1:41.646 | 1:41.455 | 1:42.070 | 5 |
| 6 | 22 | (Japan) Yuki Tsunoda | Red Bull Racing-Honda RBPT | 1:42.347 | 1:41.788 | 1:42.143 | 6 |
| 7 | 4 | (United Kingdom) Lando Norris | McLaren-Mercedes | 1:41.322 | 1:41.396 | 1:42.239 | 7 |
| 8 | 6 | (France) Isack Hadjar | Racing Bulls-Honda RBPT | 1:41.656 | 1:41.647 | 1:42.372 | 8 |
| 9 | 81 | (Australia) Oscar Piastri | McLaren-Mercedes | 1:41.839 | 1:41.414 | No time | 9 |
| 10 | 16 | (Monaco) Charles Leclerc | Ferrari | 1:41.458 | 1:41.519 | No time | 10 |
| 11 | 14 | (Spain) Fernando Alonso | Aston Martin Aramco-Mercedes | 1:42.211 | 1:41.857 | N/A | 11 |
| 12 | 44 | (United Kingdom) Lewis Hamilton | Ferrari | 1:41.821 | 1:42.183 | N/A | 12 |
| 13 | 5 | (Brazil) Gabriel Bortoleto | Kick Sauber-Ferrari | 1:42.511 | 1:42.277 | N/A | 13 |
| 14 | 18 | (Canada) Lance Stroll | Aston Martin Aramco-Mercedes | 1:42.101 | 1:43.061 | N/A | 14 |
| 15 | 87 | (United Kingdom) Oliver Bearman | Haas-Ferrari | 1:42.666 | No time | N/A | 15 |
| 16 | 43 | (Argentina) Franco Colapinto | Alpine-Renault | 1:42.779 | N/A | N/A | 16 |
| 17 | 27 | (Germany) Nico Hülkenberg | Kick Sauber-Ferrari | 1:42.916 | N/A | N/A | 17 |
| 18 | 10 | (France) Pierre Gasly | Alpine-Renault | 1:43.139 | N/A | N/A | 18 |
| 19 | 23 | (Thailand) Alexander Albon | Williams-Mercedes | 1:43.778 | N/A | N/A | 19 |
| DSQ | 31 | (France) Esteban Ocon | Haas-Ferrari | 1:43.004 | N/A | N/A | 20^{1} |
107% time: 1:48.414

Notes

- ^1 – Esteban Ocon qualified 18th, but was disqualified for a technical infringement on his car. He was allowed to race at the stewards' discretion.

== Race ==
The race was held on 21 September 2025, at 15:00 local time (UTC+4), and was run for 51 laps.

=== Race report ===
Championship leader Oscar Piastri jumped the start, triggered the car's anti-stall and dropped to last as a result. He eventually crashed at the sixth turn on the first lap, marking his first retirement since the 2023 United States Grand Prix, triggering the safety car that came in on lap 4. Fernando Alonso, who started in 11th, behind Piastri, incorrectly reacted to Piastri's jump start, and was penalised for jumping the start. Mercedes' George Russell, who was feeling unwell throughout the weekend, started with hard tyres, had a bad restart following the safety car ending at lap 4, and got passed by both Tsunoda and Antonelli but managed to overtake the former. On lap 17, while attempting to overtake Franco Colapinto at turn 7, Williams' Alexander Albon hit the rear left of Colapinto, causing the latter to spin and triggering a brief safety car, but Colapinto managed to recover, and Albon was given a ten-second time penalty as a result. With Antonelli pitting earlier, Russell took advantage of the hard tyres, closing the gap to Williams' Carlos Sainz Jr., and successfully overcut Sainz on lap 40 with a well-timed pit stop.

Polesitter Max Verstappen converted pole position to win his fourth race of the season, and marked consecutive race wins for the first time in the season. Russell finished in second, his seventh podium of the season. Sainz, who finished in third, scored his team's first podium since the rain-curtailed 2021 Belgian Grand Prix. Verstappen, who led the whole race, scored his sixth grand chelem of his Formula One career. Antonelli finished fourth, Liam Lawson finished in fifth place, scoring his best finish in his career, and his teammate Isack Hadjar managed to get tenth place, with Racing Bulls successfully gaining points five races in a row. Norris finished seventh, and Lewis Hamilton finished in eighth.

=== Race classification ===
| Pos. | No. | Driver | Constructor | Laps | Time/Retired | Grid | Points |
|---|---|---|---|---|---|---|---|
| 1 | 1 | (Netherlands) Max Verstappen | Red Bull Racing-Honda RBPT | 51 | 1:33:26.408 | 1 | 25 |
| 2 | 63 | (United Kingdom) George Russell | Mercedes | 51 | +14.609 | 5 | 18 |
| 3 | 55 | (Spain) Carlos Sainz Jr. | Williams-Mercedes | 51 | +19.199 | 2 | 15 |
| 4 | 12 | (Italy) Kimi Antonelli | Mercedes | 51 | +21.760 | 4 | 12 |
| 5 | 30 | (New Zealand) Liam Lawson | Racing Bulls-Honda RBPT | 51 | +33.290 | 3 | 10 |
| 6 | 22 | (Japan) Yuki Tsunoda | Red Bull Racing-Honda RBPT | 51 | +33.808 | 6 | 8 |
| 7 | 4 | (United Kingdom) Lando Norris | McLaren-Mercedes | 51 | +34.227 | 7 | 6 |
| 8 | 44 | (United Kingdom) Lewis Hamilton | Ferrari | 51 | +36.310 | 12 | 4 |
| 9 | 16 | (Monaco) Charles Leclerc | Ferrari | 51 | +36.774 | 10 | 2 |
| 10 | 6 | (France) Isack Hadjar | Racing Bulls-Honda RBPT | 51 | +38.982 | 8 | 1 |
| 11 | 5 | (Brazil) Gabriel Bortoleto | Kick Sauber-Ferrari | 51 | +1:07.606 | 13 | |
| 12 | 87 | (United Kingdom) Oliver Bearman | Haas-Ferrari | 51 | +1:08.262 | 15 | |
| 13 | 23 | (Thailand) Alexander Albon | Williams-Mercedes | 51 | +1:12.870^{1} | 19 | |
| 14 | 31 | (France) Esteban Ocon | Haas-Ferrari | 51 | +1:17.580 | 20 | |
| 15 | 14 | (Spain) Fernando Alonso | Aston Martin Aramco-Mercedes | 51 | +1:18.707 | 11 | |
| 16 | 27 | (Germany) Nico Hülkenberg | Kick Sauber-Ferrari | 51 | +1:20.237 | 17 | |
| 17 | 18 | (Canada) Lance Stroll | Aston Martin Aramco-Mercedes | 51 | +1:36.392 | 14 | |
| 18 | 10 | (France) Pierre Gasly | Alpine-Renault | 50 | +1 lap | 18 | |
| 19 | 43 | (Argentina) Franco Colapinto | Alpine-Renault | 50 | +1 lap | 16 | |
| Ret | 81 | (Australia) Oscar Piastri | McLaren-Mercedes | 0 | Accident | 9 | |

Notes

- ^1 – Alexander Albon finished 11th, but received a ten-second time penalty for causing a collision with Franco Colapinto.

== Championship standings after the race ==
Drivers' Championship standings

| Pos. | Driver | Points |
|---|---|---|
| 1 | (Australia) Oscar Piastri | 324 |
| 2 | (United Kingdom) Lando Norris | 299 |
| 3 | (Netherlands) Max Verstappen | 255 |
| 4 | (United Kingdom) George Russell | 212 |
| 5 | (Monaco) Charles Leclerc | 165 |

Constructors' Championship standings

| | Pos. | Constructor | Points |
|---|---|---|---|
| | 1 | (United Kingdom) McLaren-Mercedes | 623 |
| 1 | 2 | (Germany) Mercedes | 290 |
| 1 | 3 | (Italy) Ferrari | 286 |
| | 4 | (Austria) Red Bull Racing-Honda RBPT | 272 |
| | 5 | (United Kingdom) Williams-Mercedes | 101 |

- Note: Only the top five positions are included for both sets of standings.

== See also ==
- 2025 Baku Formula 2 round

| Previous race: 2025 Italian Grand Prix | FIA Formula One World Championship; 2025 season | Next race: 2025 Singapore Grand Prix |
| Previous race: 2024 Azerbaijan Grand Prix | Azerbaijan Grand Prix | Next race: 2026 Azerbaijan Grand Prix |
