= 2026 Azerbaijan Grand Prix =

Formula One motor race

Race 15 of 23 in the 2026 Formula One World Championship
← Previous race	Next race →
- Layout of the Baku City Circuit

Race details
- Date: 26 September 2026
- Official name: Formula 1 Qatar Airways Azerbaijan Grand Prix 2026
- Location: Baku City Circuit; Baku, Azerbaijan
- Course: Street circuit
- Course length: 6.003 km (3.730 miles)
- Distance: 51 laps, 306.042 km (190.166 miles)
- Weather: Sunny
- Attendance: 92,000

Pole position
Driver	(United Kingdom) George Russell	Mercedes
- Time: 1:42.526

Fastest lap
Driver	(United Kingdom) George Russell	Mercedes
- Time: 1:44.916 on lap 49

Podium
First	(United Kingdom) George Russell	Mercedes
Second	(Netherlands) Max Verstappen	Red Bull Racing-Red Bull Ford
Third	(France) Isack Hadjar	Red Bull Racing-Red Bull Ford

The 2026 Azerbaijan Grand Prix (officially known as the Formula 1 Qatar Airways Azerbaijan Grand Prix 2026) was a Formula One motor race held on 26 September 2026 at the Baku City Circuit in Baku, Azerbaijan. It was the fifteenth round of the 2026 Formula One World Championship.

George Russell (Mercedes) took pole position ahead of Charles Leclerc (Ferrari) and Oscar Piastri (McLaren), while championship leader Kimi Antonelli qualified sixteenth after crashing in qualifying. Russell won the race, with a winning margin of 0.196 seconds, ahead of Max Verstappen and Isack Hadjar (both Red Bull). It was his third victory of the season and the eighth of his Formula One career. Having also led every lap and set the fastest lap, he achieved his first Grand Slam. Antonelli recovered to fifth, with his championship lead over Russell reduced from 81 down to 66 points.

== Background ==
The Baku City Circuit in Baku hosted Formula One for the tenth time, across the weekend of 24–26 September, nine editions of the Azerbaijan Grand Prix and one of the European Grand Prix (2016). The Grand Prix was the fifteenth round of the 2026 Formula One World Championship and the ninth running of the Azerbaijan Grand Prix. The Grand Prix was originally scheduled for 27 September but was moved forward by one day to accommodate Remembrance Day, following a request from the promoter and relevant government stakeholders.

=== Championship standings before the race ===
Going into the weekend, Kimi Antonelli led the Drivers' Championship with 292 points, 81 points ahead of teammate George Russell in second and 101 ahead of Lewis Hamilton in third. Mercedes, with 503 points, led the Constructors' Championship from Ferrari (with 358 points) and McLaren (306 points).

=== Entrants ===
The drivers and teams were the same as the season entry list with no additional stand-in drivers for the race. Isack Hadjar (Red Bull), who injured his wrist before the Dutch Grand Prix, returned for this event. Lawson, who had replaced Hadjar at Red Bull, returned to Racing Bulls. Yuki Tsunoda, who had replaced Lawson at Racing Bulls, did not return for the Grand prix. This Grand Prix marked Sergio Pérez's 300th Grand Prix entry.

=== Tyre choices ===
Tyre supplier Pirelli selected its C3, C4, and C5 compounds—the softest in its range—for the event, designating them as hard, medium, and soft, respectively.

== Practice ==
Three free practice sessions were held for the event. The first free practice session was held on 24 September 2026, at 12:30 local time (UTC+4), and was topped by George Russell (Mercedes) ahead of Max Verstappen (Red Bull) and Charles Leclerc (Ferrari). The second free practice session was held on the same day, at 16:00 local time, and was topped by Russell ahead of his teammate Kimi Antonelli and Verstappen. A red flag was observed after Arvid Lindblad (Racing Bulls) hit the barriers at turn 8. The third free practice session was held on 25 September 2026, at 12:30 local time, and was topped by Verstappen ahead of Russell and Lewis Hamilton (Ferrari).

== Qualifying ==
Qualifying was held on 25 September 2026, and was scheduled to start at 16:00 local time (UTC+4), before being delayed to 16:04. The session determined the starting grid order for the race.

=== Qualifying report ===
During Q1, the opening part of qualifying, Kimi Antonelli (Mercedes) struck the inside wall at turn 1, damaging his suspension. The damage could not be repaired in time for him to continue. Although his earlier lap was sufficient to advance to Q2, he took no further part in the session and qualified sixteenth. Max Verstappen reported that the floor of his Red Bull was hitting the ground, compromising his braking. George Russell (Mercedes) finished Q1 fastest with a time of 1:43.615, ahead of Verstappen and Isack Hadjar (both Red Bull). The Audi drivers Gabriel Bortoleto and Nico Hülkenberg were eliminated, together with Fernando Alonso and Lance Stroll (both Aston Martin) and Sergio Pérez and Valtteri Bottas (both Cadillac).

Fifteen drivers participated in Q2. Russell again set the early pace, while Pierre Gasly benefited from a tow from his Alpine teammate Franco Colapinto. Errors compromised Arvid Lindblad's attempts to progress. Russell improved to 1:43.462 to finish ahead of Verstappen, Charles Leclerc (Ferrari) and Oscar Piastri (McLaren). Carlos Sainz Jr. (Williams) and Colapinto secured the last two places in Q3. Oliver Bearman (Haas) missed the cut by 0.092 seconds and qualified eleventh, ahead of Liam Lawson (Racing Bulls), Alexander Albon (Williams), Esteban Ocon (Haas), Lindblad (Racing Bulls).

Lando Norris and then Piastri (both McLaren) held provisional pole during the opening Q3 runs, with Piastri benefiting from a slipstream. Russell subsequently moved ahead and improved again on his final attempt. Norris locked up on his last lap and could not improve. Russell's pole time of 1:42.526 was 0.837 seconds faster than Leclerc's, with Piastri a further 0.001 seconds back in third. Hadjar qualified fourth, followed by Norris, Lewis Hamilton (Ferrari), Gasly, Verstappen, Sainz and Colapinto. This was Russell's fifth pole position of the season.

Four grid penalties altered the starting order. Sainz was demoted from ninth to fourteenth for failing to slow for yellow flags. Pérez received a three-place penalty for impeding Piastri, but remained twentieth after the other penalties were applied. Alonso and Stroll received penalties of 30 and 20 places, respectively, for using additional power-unit elements and occupied the back row, with Bottas promoted to nineteenth.

=== Qualifying classification ===
Pos.	No.	Driver	Constructor	Qualifying times			Final grid
Pos.	No.	Driver	Constructor	Q1	Q2	Q3	Final grid
1	63	(United Kingdom) George Russell	Mercedes	1:43.615	1:43.462	1:42.526	1
2	16	(Monaco) Charles Leclerc	Ferrari	1:44.360	1:43.780	1:43.363	2
3	81	(Australia) Oscar Piastri	McLaren-Mercedes	1:45.014	1:43.814	1:43.364	3
4	6	(France) Isack Hadjar	Red Bull Racing-Red Bull Ford	1:44.161	1:43.880	1:43.500	4
5	1	(United Kingdom) Lando Norris	McLaren-Mercedes	1:44.571	1:44.020	1:43.672	5
6	44	(United Kingdom) Lewis Hamilton	Ferrari	1:44.260	1:44.037	1:43.858	6
7	10	(France) Pierre Gasly	Alpine-Mercedes	1:44.489	1:44.106	1:44.047	7
8	3	(Netherlands) Max Verstappen	Red Bull Racing-Red Bull Ford	1:44.041	1:43.706	1:44.081	8
9	55	(Spain) Carlos Sainz Jr.	Atlassian Williams-Mercedes	1:45.104	1:44.629	1:44.566	14^{a}
10	43	(Argentina) Franco Colapinto	Alpine-Mercedes	1:45.106	1:44.683	1:44.963	9
11	87	(United Kingdom) Oliver Bearman	Haas-Ferrari	1:45.228	1:44.775	N/A	10
12	30	(New Zealand) Liam Lawson	Racing Bulls-Red Bull Ford	1:45.535	1:44.860	N/A	11
13	23	(Thailand) Alexander Albon	Atlassian Williams-Mercedes	1:45.031	1:45.001	N/A	12
14	31	(France) Esteban Ocon	Haas-Ferrari	1:45.039	1:45.016	N/A	13
15	41	(United Kingdom) Arvid Lindblad	Racing Bulls-Red Bull Ford	1:45.381	1:45.106	N/A	15
16	12	(Italy) Kimi Antonelli	Mercedes	1:45.504	No time	N/A	16
17	5	(Brazil) Gabriel Bortoleto	Audi	1:45.799	N/A	N/A	17
18	27	(Germany) Nico Hülkenberg	Audi	1:45.920	N/A	N/A	18
19	14	(Spain) Fernando Alonso	Aston Martin Aramco-Honda	1:46.593	N/A	N/A	21^{b}
20	11	(Mexico) Sergio Pérez	Cadillac-Ferrari	1:46.658	N/A	N/A	20^{c}
21	18	(Canada) Lance Stroll	Aston Martin Aramco-Honda	1:47.337	N/A	N/A	22^{d}
22	77	(Finland) Valtteri Bottas	Cadillac-Ferrari	1:48.290	N/A	N/A	19
107% time: 1:50.868

Notes

- ^a – Carlos Sainz Jr. received a five-place grid penalty for failing to slow for yellow flags in Q3.
- ^b – Fernando Alonso received a 30-place grid penalty for exceeding his quota of power unit elements.
- ^c – Sergio Pérez received a three-place grid penalty for impeding Oscar Piastri in Q1.
- ^d – Lance Stroll received a 20-place grid penalty for exceeding his quota of power unit elements.

== Race ==
The race was held on 26 September 2026, at 15:00 local time (UTC+4), and was run for 51 laps.

=== Race report ===
==== Opening stint ====
The start of the Grand Prix

George Russell (Mercedes) started on the medium-compound tyres, as did Max Verstappen (Red Bull) and the sixteenth-placed Kimi Antonelli (Mercedes). Charles Leclerc (Ferrari), Oscar Piastri (McLaren), Isack Hadjar (Red Bull) and Lewis Hamilton (Ferrari) started on soft tyres. Russell retained the lead at the start, while Piastri passed Leclerc for second and Lando Norris (McLaren) moved ahead of Hadjar. Verstappen gained places on Pierre Gasly (Alpine) and Hamilton during the opening exchanges. Antonelli initially dropped to seventeenth, while Russell completed the opening lap as the leader of the race.

Hadjar passed Norris for fourth and then passed Leclerc, with Verstappen also overtaking both drivers. Red Bull instructed Hadjar to allow Verstappen through into third, after which Piastri held off the two Red Bulls while Russell extended his lead. Verstappen subsequently reported difficulties with his medium tyres, while Hadjar indicated that he had more pace on softs. The team instructed Hadjar to hold position behind Verstappen. Red Bull team principal Laurent Mekies later explained that the team considered this its best opportunity to challenge Piastri and Russell, anticipating a safety car that would allow Verstappen to switch to soft tyres. Antonelli gradually recovered through the midfield, passing Oliver Bearman (Haas) to enter the top ten on lap 17. Norris lost a position to Hamilton after a braking error. Both Aston Martin drivers retired; both with water pressure issues.

==== Mid race ====
Russell made light contact with the wall at turn 15 around half distance and asked Mercedes to check his tyre pressures, but continued in the lead. Later, Norris locked up at turn 1 and used the run-off area, allowing Gasly and Antonelli to pass. Alexander Albon (Williams) then crashed into the barriers, prompting the first safety car period. The intervention removed Russell's advantage of approximately eleven seconds over Piastri. Antonelli, who had reached eighth but was about 35 seconds behind the leader, was also brought back into contention with the cars ahead. The leading drivers made their pit stops during the safety car period. Russell, Verstappen, Gasly, Antonelli, Norris and Franco Colapinto (Alpine) all switched to softs, while Piastri, Hadjar, Leclerc and Hamilton fitted mediums. Russell retained the lead ahead of Piastri, Verstappen and Hadjar. Carlos Sainz Jr. (Williams), who had stopped before the safety car was deployed, lost out relative to those able to make their stops during the neutralisation.

Racing resumed on lap 36, with Russell retaining the lead and Verstappen passing Piastri for second. Colapinto locked up while approaching turn 1 on the inside of Gasly and struck his teammate, whose car then collided with Norris. Gasly, Norris and Collapinto all retired with terminal damage. The incident brought out the safety car again. In a separate collision behind them, Arvid Lindblad made contact with his Racing Bulls teammate Liam Lawson, spinning Lawson around. Both continued, and Lindblad received no penalty. Antonelli sustained floor damage in contact with Bearman at the restart. The second restart took place on lap 39. Russell remained ahead of Verstappen, with Piastri and Hadjar in third and fourth. On lap 40, Piastri locked up at turn 1 while defending from Hadjar, ran onto the escape road and dropped from third to fifteenth. His mistake promoted Hadjar into the podium positions and moved Leclerc, Hamilton and Antonelli up behind him. Antonelli subsequently passed Hamilton for fifth and closed on Leclerc, but was unable to take fourth before the finish.

==== Closing laps ====
Verstappen kept Russell under pressure during the final stint, although Russell briefly increased his advantage in the closing laps. A late accident for Valtteri Bottas (Cadillac) brought out yellow flags. Russell later said that lifting off for the flags left him without the expected power when he accelerated again. This allowed Verstappen to close rapidly on the run to the finish, with Russell winning the race by 0.196 seconds. Hadjar finished third on his return, followed by Leclerc, Antonelli and Hamilton. Lindblad passed Esteban Ocon (Haas) on the run to the chequered flag to take seventh. Bearman finished ninth, giving Haas a double-points finish, while Sainz recovered to tenth. Nico Hülkenberg (Audi) and Lawson finished outside the points in eleventh and twelfth. Bottas was classified sixteenth despite his retirement, as he had completed 90% of the race winner's distance.

=== Post-race and championship impact ===
Russell's victory was his third of the season and the eighth of his career. Russell achieved his first Grand Slam by winning from pole position, leading every lap and recording the fastest lap. Antonelli retained the championship lead, with his advantage over Russell falling from 81 to 66 points with eight rounds remaining. Mercedes extended its lead over Ferrari in the Constructors' Championship to 160 points.

After the race, Gabriel Bortoleto (Audi) received a ten-second penalty for overtaking under yellow flags, dropping him from thirteenth to fifteenth and promoting Piastri and Sergio Pérez (Cadillac) to thirteenth and fourteenth, respectively. Colapinto's unserved ten-second penalty (for the collision on lap 36) was converted into a five-place grid penalty for the following Bahrain Grand Prix.

In his post-race interview, Norris criticised Colapinto, saying there are "some drivers who shouldn't be in Formula One" and called for a one-race ban for Colapinto. Alpine executive advisor Flavio Briatore was "extremely disappointed" and offered an apology to Norris and McLaren, adding that he would consider his next steps to avoid a future repeat. Colapinto issued an apology for causing the collision. Following his criticism of Colapinto, Norris became a victim of online abuse by some of Colapinto's supporters including Argentine footballer Sergio Agüero and Pablo Quirno, the Argentine minister of foreign affairs. Alpine issued a statement condemning online abuse. Days later, Norris issued a public apology to Colapinto.

=== Race classification ===
Pos.	No.	Driver	Constructor	Laps	Time/Retired	Grid	Points
1	63	(United Kingdom) George Russell	Mercedes	51	1:38:02.143	1	25
2	3	(Netherlands) Max Verstappen	Red Bull Racing-Red Bull Ford	51	+0.196	8	18
3	6	(France) Isack Hadjar	Red Bull Racing-Red Bull Ford	51	+10.704	4	15
4	16	(Monaco) Charles Leclerc	Ferrari	51	+14.136	2	12
5	12	(Italy) Kimi Antonelli	Mercedes	51	+14.512	16	10
6	44	(United Kingdom) Lewis Hamilton	Ferrari	51	+22.382	6	8
7	41	(United Kingdom) Arvid Lindblad	Racing Bulls-Red Bull Ford	51	+31.159	15	6
8	31	(France) Esteban Ocon	Haas-Ferrari	51	+31.189	13	4
9	87	(United Kingdom) Oliver Bearman	Haas-Ferrari	51	+31.929	10	2
10	55	(Spain) Carlos Sainz Jr.	Atlassian Williams-Mercedes	51	+32.416	14	1
11	27	(Germany) Nico Hülkenberg	Audi	51	+33.231	18	
12	30	(New Zealand) Liam Lawson	Racing Bulls-Red Bull Ford	51	+34.013	11	
13	81	(Australia) Oscar Piastri	McLaren-Mercedes	51	+36.401	3	
14	11	(Mexico) Sergio Pérez	Cadillac-Ferrari	51	+41.400	20	
15	5	(Brazil) Gabriel Bortoleto	Audi	51	+44.230^{a}	17	
16^{b}	77	(Finland) Valtteri Bottas	Cadillac-Ferrari	49	Accident	19	
Ret	43	(Argentina) Franco Colapinto	Alpine-Mercedes	36	Collision damage	9	
Ret	10	(France) Pierre Gasly	Alpine-Mercedes	35	Collision	7	
Ret	1	(United Kingdom) Lando Norris	McLaren-Mercedes	35	Collision	5	
Ret	23	(Thailand) Alexander Albon	Atlassian Williams-Mercedes	29	Accident	12	
Ret	14	(Spain) Fernando Alonso	Aston Martin Aramco-Honda	20	Water pressure	21	
Ret	18	(Canada) Lance Stroll	Aston Martin Aramco-Honda	7	Water pressure	22	

Notes

- ^a – Gabriel Bortoleto finished 13th on track, but received a post-race 10-second time penalty for overtaking under yellow flags.
- ^b – Valtteri Bottas was classified as he completed more than 90% of the race distance.

== Championship standings after the race ==
Drivers' Championship standings

Pos.	Driver	Points
1	(Italy) Kimi Antonelli	302
2	(United Kingdom) George Russell	236
3	(United Kingdom) Lewis Hamilton	199
4	(United Kingdom) Lando Norris	186
5	(Monaco) Charles Leclerc	179

Constructors' Championship standings

Pos.	Constructor	Points
1	(Germany) Mercedes	538
2	(Italy) Ferrari	378
3	(United Kingdom) McLaren-Mercedes	306
4	(Austria) Red Bull Racing-Red Bull Ford	263
5	(Italy) Racing Bulls-Red Bull Ford	83

- Note: Only the top five positions are included for both sets of standings.

== See also ==
- 2026 Baku Formula 2 round

Previous race: 2026 Spanish Grand Prix	FIA Formula One World Championship; 2026 season	Next race: 2026 Bahrain Grand Prix
Previous race: 2025 Azerbaijan Grand Prix	Azerbaijan Grand Prix	Next race: 2027 Azerbaijan Grand Prix
