= 2022 Azerbaijan Grand Prix =

8th round of the 2022 Formula One World Championship

Race 8 of 22 in the 2022 Formula One World Championship
| ← Previous race | Next race → |
- Layout of the Baku City Circuit

Race details
- Date: 12 June 2022
- Official name: Formula 1 Azerbaijan Grand Prix 2022
- Location: Baku City Circuit; Baku, Azerbaijan
- Course: Street circuit
- Course length: 6.003 km (3.730 miles)
- Distance: 51 laps, 306.049 km (190.170 miles)
- Weather: Sunny

Pole position
| Driver | (Monaco) Charles Leclerc | Ferrari |
- Time: 1:41.359

Fastest lap
| Driver | (Mexico) Sergio Pérez | Red Bull Racing-RBPT |
- Time: 1:46.046 on lap 36

Podium
| First | (Netherlands) Max Verstappen | Red Bull Racing-RBPT |
| Second | (Mexico) Sergio Pérez | Red Bull Racing-RBPT |
| Third | (United Kingdom) George Russell | Mercedes |

The 2022 Azerbaijan Grand Prix (officially known as the Formula 1 Azerbaijan Grand Prix 2022) was the eighth round of the 2022 Formula One World Championship at the Baku City Circuit in Baku on 12 June 2022. The 51-lap race was won by Max Verstappen. Charles Leclerc, who was second in the championship standings prior to the race, retired on lap 21 due to power unit issues, and fell to third in the standings behind Sergio Pérez. With the win, Verstappen extended his lead to 21 points.

== Background ==
=== Championship standings before the race ===
In the Drivers' Championship, Max Verstappen led with 125 points, nine points ahead of Charles Leclerc in second, and fifteen points ahead of Sergio Pérez in third position. Red Bull Racing led Ferrari by 36 points, and Mercedes by 101 points in the Constructors' Championship.

=== Entrants ===
The drivers and teams were the same as the season entry list with no additional stand-in drivers for the race.

=== Tyre choices ===
Tyre supplier Pirelli brought the C3, C4, and C5 tyre compounds (designated hard, medium, and soft, respectively) for teams to use at the event.

== Practice ==
The first two free practices took place on 10 June 2022, at 15:00–16:00 and 18:00–19:00 local time (UTC+04:00) respectively and the third practice was initially scheduled to take place on 11 June 2022, at 15:00 local time, but was postponed to 15:15 local time, to allow for barrier repairs following a crash in the Formula 2 support race that had taken place around 13:30.

== Qualifying ==
Qualifying was due to start at 18:00 local time on 11 June, but the session start was delayed to 18:15 as a consequence of delaying the final practice session.

With about four minutes to go in the first segment of qualifying, Lance Stroll locked up and hit the barrier, at low speed, at turn 7. He reversed and carried on, and hit the barrier again, this time at turn 2 and with a lot more speed. He broke his front wing and front right suspension and was forced to leave his car on track. This resulted in a red flag. Once the session restarted, all the drivers who wanted to set another lap managed to get to the start line on time, but on his last flying lap, Fernando Alonso went straight on at turn 15 and caused yellow flags, meaning the drivers behind could not complete their laps at full speed. Alexander Albon accused Alonso of going off on purpose, Alonso later denied the claims. Kevin Magnussen, Albon, Nicholas Latifi, Stroll and Mick Schumacher were all knocked out from qualifying after the first session.

With just under seven and a half minutes to go in the second qualifying session, Sebastian Vettel locked up at turn 15 and hit the barrier at low speed. His car was undamaged, so he reversed and carried on. Similarly to Vettel, Lando Norris also went straight on at turn 15, however he was able to avoid the barriers. Norris spun his car around and carried on, but ultimately, the mistake cost him his lap and he was eliminated. Norris, Daniel Ricciardo, Esteban Ocon, Zhou Guanyu and Valtteri Bottas were all knocked out from qualifying in the second session.

As everyone completed their first laps in the top-10 shootout for pole, Carlos Sainz Jr. took provisional pole, with his Ferrari teammate, Charles Leclerc, just 4 hundredths off of Sainz's time. As everyone completed their final laps, Leclerc, Sergio Pérez and Max Verstappen all improved above Sainz, who finished his qualifying in fourth. Leclerc took pole by three tenths from Perez, Verstappen, Sainz, George Russell, Pierre Gasly, Lewis Hamilton, Yuki Tsunoda, Vettel and Alonso.

=== Qualifying classification ===
| Pos. | No. | Driver | Constructor | Qualifying times | | | Final grid |
| Pos. | No. | Driver | Constructor | Q1 | Q2 | Q3 | Final grid |
|---|---|---|---|---|---|---|---|
| 1 | 16 | (Monaco) Charles Leclerc | Ferrari | 1:42.865 | 1:42.046 | 1:41.359 | 1 |
| 2 | 11 | (Mexico) Sergio Pérez | Red Bull Racing-RBPT | 1:42.733 | 1:41.955 | 1:41.641 | 2 |
| 3 | 1 | (Netherlands) Max Verstappen | Red Bull Racing-RBPT | 1:42.722 | 1:42.227 | 1:41.706 | 3 |
| 4 | 55 | (Spain) Carlos Sainz Jr. | Ferrari | 1:42.957 | 1:42.088 | 1:41.814 | 4 |
| 5 | 63 | (United Kingdom) George Russell | Mercedes | 1:43.754 | 1:43.281 | 1:42.712 | 5 |
| 6 | 10 | (France) Pierre Gasly | AlphaTauri-RBPT | 1:43.268 | 1:43.129 | 1:42.845 | 6 |
| 7 | 44 | (United Kingdom) Lewis Hamilton | Mercedes | 1:43.939 | 1:43.182 | 1:42.924 | 7 |
| 8 | 22 | (Japan) Yuki Tsunoda | AlphaTauri-RBPT | 1:43.595 | 1:43.376 | 1:43.056 | 8 |
| 9 | 5 | (Germany) Sebastian Vettel | Aston Martin Aramco-Mercedes | 1:43.279 | 1:43.268 | 1:43.091 | 9 |
| 10 | 14 | (Spain) Fernando Alonso | Alpine-Renault | 1:44.083 | 1:43.360 | 1:43.173 | 10 |
| 11 | 4 | (United Kingdom) Lando Norris | McLaren-Mercedes | 1:44.237 | 1:43.398 | N/A | 11 |
| 12 | 3 | (Australia) Daniel Ricciardo | McLaren-Mercedes | 1:44.437 | 1:43.574 | N/A | 12 |
| 13 | 31 | (France) Esteban Ocon | Alpine-Renault | 1:43.903 | 1:43.585 | N/A | 13 |
| 14 | 24 | (China) Zhou Guanyu | Alfa Romeo-Ferrari | 1:43.777 | 1:43.790 | N/A | 14 |
| 15 | 77 | (Finland) Valtteri Bottas | Alfa Romeo-Ferrari | 1:44.478 | 1:44.444 | N/A | 15 |
| 16 | 20 | (Denmark) Kevin Magnussen | Haas-Ferrari | 1:44.643 | N/A | N/A | 16 |
| 17 | 23 | (Thailand) Alexander Albon | Williams-Mercedes | 1:44.719 | N/A | N/A | 17 |
| 18 | 6 | (Canada) Nicholas Latifi | Williams-Mercedes | 1:45.367 | N/A | N/A | 18 |
| 19 | 18 | (Canada) Lance Stroll | Aston Martin Aramco-Mercedes | 1:45.371 | N/A | N/A | 19 |
| 20 | 47 | (Germany) Mick Schumacher | Haas-Ferrari | 1:45.775 | N/A | N/A | 20 |
107% time: 1:49.912

== Race ==
The race started at 15:00 local time on 12 June. Sergio Pérez took the lead heading into turn 1 on lap 1, after polesitter Charles Leclerc locked up his front left tyre. On Lap 9, Carlos Sainz Jr. pulled over in the run-off area of turn 4 after suffering a hydraulics issue with his car. This resulted in the virtual safety car, in which most of the grid, including Leclerc, chose to pit with the Red Bulls of Max Verstappen and Pérez choosing not to. On lap 15, Verstappen overtook Pérez into turn 1. Pérez pitted on lap 17 for new hards, a slow stop meant that when he exited the pits, Leclerc had passed him, and Verstappen, who pitted two laps later, was able to overcut his team-mate. On lap 21, Leclerc's car started billowing smoke with an engine problem on the main straight causing his retirement, with Zhou Guanyu retiring on lap 23 with a hydraulics issue. On lap 31, Kevin Magnussen's car also had an engine issue resulting in smoke. He pulled over just before turn 15 off the racing line, but it still resulted in a second virtual safety car. Most of the grid chose to pit for fresher tyres. Tsunoda was shown the black-and-orange flag for a DRS failure, which was fixed with speed tape, and him dropped to 13th. Williams's Latifi received a ten-second stop and go penalty after for a grid infringement and was later given a five-second time penalty for ignoring blue flags. On lap 45, Lewis Hamilton overtook Pierre Gasly for fourth. On lap 48, Lance Stroll was called in to retire due to high oscillations. Verstappen won the race, and Pérez finished second. George Russell finished third for Mercedes, with Hamilton in fourth, and Gasly fifth. Sebastian Vettel, Fernando Alonso, Daniel Ricciardo, Lando Norris and Esteban Ocon completed the top 10.

=== Race classification ===
| Pos. | No. | Driver | Constructor | Laps | Time/Retired | Grid | Points |
|---|---|---|---|---|---|---|---|
| 1 | 1 | (Netherlands) Max Verstappen | Red Bull Racing-RBPT | 51 | 1:34:05.941 | 3 | 25 |
| 2 | 11 | (Mexico) Sergio Pérez | Red Bull Racing-RBPT | 51 | +20.823 | 2 | 19^{1} |
| 3 | 63 | (United Kingdom) George Russell | Mercedes | 51 | +45.995 | 5 | 15 |
| 4 | 44 | (United Kingdom) Lewis Hamilton | Mercedes | 51 | +1:11.679 | 7 | 12 |
| 5 | 10 | (France) Pierre Gasly | AlphaTauri-RBPT | 51 | +1:17.299 | 6 | 10 |
| 6 | 5 | (Germany) Sebastian Vettel | Aston Martin Aramco-Mercedes | 51 | +1:24.099 | 9 | 8 |
| 7 | 14 | (Spain) Fernando Alonso | Alpine-Renault | 51 | +1:28.596 | 10 | 6 |
| 8 | 3 | (Australia) Daniel Ricciardo | McLaren-Mercedes | 51 | +1:32.207 | 12 | 4 |
| 9 | 4 | (United Kingdom) Lando Norris | McLaren-Mercedes | 51 | +1:32.556 | 11 | 2 |
| 10 | 31 | (France) Esteban Ocon | Alpine-Renault | 51 | +1:48.184 | 13 | 1 |
| 11 | 77 | (Finland) Valtteri Bottas | Alfa Romeo-Ferrari | 50 | +1 lap | 15 | |
| 12 | 23 | (Thailand) Alexander Albon | Williams-Mercedes | 50 | +1 lap | 17 | |
| 13 | 22 | (Japan) Yuki Tsunoda | AlphaTauri-RBPT | 50 | +1 lap | 8 | |
| 14 | 47 | (Germany) Mick Schumacher | Haas-Ferrari | 50 | +1 lap | 20 | |
| 15 | 6 | (Canada) Nicholas Latifi | Williams-Mercedes | 50 | +1 lap^{2} | 18 | |
| 16^{3} | 18 | (Canada) Lance Stroll | Aston Martin Aramco-Mercedes | 46 | Vibration | 19 | |
| Ret | 20 | (Denmark) Kevin Magnussen | Haas-Ferrari | 31 | Power unit | 16 | |
| Ret | 24 | (China) Zhou Guanyu | Alfa Romeo-Ferrari | 23 | Hydraulics | 14 | |
| Ret | 16 | (Monaco) Charles Leclerc | Ferrari | 21 | Power unit | 1 | |
| Ret | 55 | (Spain) Carlos Sainz Jr. | Ferrari | 8 | Hydraulics | 4 | |
Fastest lap: (Mexico) Sergio Pérez (Red Bull Racing-RBPT) – 1:46.046 (lap 36)

Notes

- ^1 – Includes one point for fastest lap.
- ^2 – Nicholas Latifi received a five-second time penalty for ignoring blue flags. His final position was not affected by the penalty.
- ^3 – Lance Stroll was classified as he completed more than 90% of the race distance.

== Championship standings after the race ==
Drivers' Championship standings

| | Pos. | Driver | Points |
|---|---|---|---|
| | 1 | (Netherlands) Max Verstappen | 150 |
| 1 | 2 | (Mexico) Sergio Pérez | 129 |
| 1 | 3 | (Monaco) Charles Leclerc | 116 |
| | 4 | (United Kingdom) George Russell | 99 |
| | 5 | (Spain) Carlos Sainz Jr. | 83 |

Constructors' Championship standings

| | Pos. | Constructor | Points |
|---|---|---|---|
| | 1 | (Austria) Red Bull Racing-RBPT | 279 |
| | 2 | (Italy) Ferrari | 199 |
| | 3 | (Germany) Mercedes | 161 |
| | 4 | (United Kingdom) McLaren-Mercedes | 65 |
| 1 | 5 | (France) Alpine-Renault | 47 |

- Note: Only the top five positions are included for both sets of standings.

== See also ==
- 2022 Baku Formula 2 round

| Previous race: 2022 Monaco Grand Prix | FIA Formula One World Championship; 2022 season | Next race: 2022 Canadian Grand Prix |
| Previous race: 2021 Azerbaijan Grand Prix | Azerbaijan Grand Prix | Next race: 2023 Azerbaijan Grand Prix |
