= 2023 Azerbaijan Grand Prix =

Formula One motor race

Race 4 of 22 (Note: At the time of the event Formula One planned to hold twenty-three Grands Prix.) in the 2023 Formula One World Championship
← Previous race	Next race →
- Layout of the Baku City Circuit

Race details
- Date: 30 April 2023
- Official name: Formula 1 Azerbaijan Grand Prix 2023
- Location: Baku City Circuit; Baku, Azerbaijan
- Course: Street circuit
- Course length: 6.003 km (3.730 miles)
- Distance: 51 laps, 306.049 km (190.170 miles)
- Weather: Partly cloudy

Pole position
Driver	(Monaco) Charles Leclerc	Ferrari
- Time: 1:40.203

Fastest lap
Driver	(United Kingdom) George Russell	Mercedes
- Time: 1:43.370 on lap 51

Podium
First	(Mexico) Sergio Pérez	Red Bull Racing-Honda RBPT
Second	(Netherlands) Max Verstappen	Red Bull Racing-Honda RBPT
Third	(Monaco) Charles Leclerc	Ferrari

The 2023 Azerbaijan Grand Prix (officially known as the Formula 1 Azerbaijan Grand Prix 2023) was a Formula One motor race held on 30 April 2023 at the Baku City Circuit in Baku, Azerbaijan. It was the fourth round of the 2023 Formula One World Championship and the first of six in the season to follow the sprint format.

Charles Leclerc started both events from pole position, with Sergio Pérez winning both events. During the final lap of the race, an incident occurred where Alpine driver Esteban Ocon was forced to avoid several photographers that had begun to cross the pit lane while coming in for a pit stop. This was Pérez' sixth and, as of 2026, most recent Formula One victory.

== Background ==
The event was held across the weekend of 28–30 April 2023. It was the fourth round of the 2023 Formula One World Championship. The weekend was the first of six in the season to follow the sprint format.

=== Weekend format ===
The event was the first in the season to feature a new format specifically adopted for those Grands Prix which include the additional sprint race. The format consisted of a single practice session on Friday, followed by the qualifying session which determined the grid for the Sunday's Grand Prix. On Saturday, a new qualifying session called "sprint shootout", in place of the former second practice session, was run, determining the grid for the sprint. The traditional Grand Prix took place on Sunday. The new sprint shootout qualifying was run shorter than the traditional qualifying: the first segment (SQ1) was 12 minutes, the second segment (SQ2) was 10 minutes, and the third segment (SQ3) was 8 minutes. In addition, new tyres were mandatory for each phase, with mediums for SQ1 and SQ2, and softs for SQ3.

=== Championship standings before the race ===
Going into the weekend, Max Verstappen led the World Drivers' Championship with 69 points, 15 points ahead of his teammate Sergio Pérez in second, and 24 ahead of Fernando Alonso in third. Red Bull Racing, with 123 points, led the Constructors' Championship from Aston Martin and Mercedes, who were second and third with 65 and 56 points, respectively.

=== Entrants ===
The drivers and teams were the same as the season entry list with no additional stand-in drivers for the race.

=== Tyre choices ===
Tyre supplier Pirelli brought the C3, C4, and C5 tyre compounds (designated hard, medium, and soft, respectively) for teams to use at the event.

=== Track changes ===
The second DRS activation point was moved 100 metres (330 ft) farther ahead, being positioned 447 metres (1,467 ft) after turn 20.

== Qualifying ==
Qualifying was held on 28 April 2023 at 17:00 local time (UTC+4) and determined the starting order for the main race.

=== Qualifying report ===
Following fire damage to his Alpine during the practice session, Pierre Gasly's car was repaired prior to qualifying. Zhou Guanyu spun at turn 1, but recovered the car; moments later, Nyck de Vries locked up at turn 3 and crashed into the wall, damaging his suspension and causing a red flag. He failed to post a lap time fast enough to clear the 107% time, but the stewards allowed him to race. Following the restart, Gasly hit the wall at the same corner de Vries crashed into earlier, causing a second red flag. Zhou, the two Haas cars of Kevin Magnussen and Nico Hülkenberg, Gasly and de Vries were knocked out of the first session (Q1).

The second session (Q2) saw George Russell, Esteban Ocon, Valtteri Bottas and the two Williamses of Alexander Albon and Logan Sargeant all knocked out. The Aston Martins of Fernando Alonso and Lance Stroll suffered a DRS issue throughout qualifying, hindering their laps and leaving them sixth and ninth respectively.

Charles Leclerc secured pole position ahead of Max Verstappen and Sergio Pérez; this was his third consecutive pole in the Baku City Circuit, his and the Ferrari team's first since the 2022 Singapore Grand Prix. His lap time of 1:40.203 set a new unofficial lap record at the circuit, (Note: Official lap records are only set in races.) beating the previous time of 1:40.495 set by Valtteri Bottas for Mercedes at the 2019 edition.

=== Qualifying classification ===
Pos.	No.	Driver	Constructor	Qualifying times			Final grid
Pos.	No.	Driver	Constructor	Q1	Q2	Q3	Final grid
1	16	(Monaco) Charles Leclerc	Ferrari	1:41.269	1:41.037	1:40.203	1
2	1	(Netherlands) Max Verstappen	Red Bull Racing-Honda RBPT	1:41.398	1:40.822	1:40.391	2
3	11	(Mexico) Sergio Pérez	Red Bull Racing-Honda RBPT	1:41.756	1:41.131	1:40.495	3
4	55	(Spain) Carlos Sainz Jr.	Ferrari	1:42.197	1:41.369	1:41.016	4
5	44	(United Kingdom) Lewis Hamilton	Mercedes	1:42.113	1:41.650	1:41.177	5
6	14	(Spain) Fernando Alonso	Aston Martin Aramco-Mercedes	1:41.720	1:41.370	1:41.253	6
7	4	(United Kingdom) Lando Norris	McLaren-Mercedes	1:42.154	1:41.485	1:41.281	7
8	22	(Japan) Yuki Tsunoda	AlphaTauri-Honda RBPT	1:42.234	1:41.569	1:41.581	8
9	18	(Canada) Lance Stroll	Aston Martin Aramco-Mercedes	1:42.524	1:41.576	1:41.611^{a}	9
10	81	(Australia) Oscar Piastri	McLaren-Mercedes	1:42.455	1:41.636	1:41.611^{a}	10
11	63	(United Kingdom) George Russell	Mercedes	1:42.073	1:41.654	N/A	11
12	31	(France) Esteban Ocon	Alpine-Renault	1:42.622	1:41.798	N/A	PL^{b}
13	23	(Thailand) Alexander Albon	Williams-Mercedes	1:42.171	1:41.818	N/A	12
14	77	(Finland) Valtteri Bottas	Alfa Romeo-Ferrari	1:42.582	1:42.259	N/A	13
15	2	(United States) Logan Sargeant	Williams-Mercedes	1:42.242	1:42.395	N/A	14
16	24	(China) Zhou Guanyu	Alfa Romeo-Ferrari	1:42.642	N/A	N/A	15
17	27	(Germany) Nico Hülkenberg	Haas-Ferrari	1:42.755	N/A	N/A	PL^{c}
18	20	(Denmark) Kevin Magnussen	Haas-Ferrari	1:43.417	N/A	N/A	16
19	10	(France) Pierre Gasly	Alpine-Renault	1:44.853	N/A	N/A	17
107% time: 1:48.357
—	21	(Netherlands) Nyck de Vries	AlphaTauri-Honda RBPT	1:55.282	N/A	N/A	18^{d}

Notes

- ^a – Lance Stroll and Oscar Piastri set identical lap times in Q3. Stroll was classified ahead as he set his time earlier.
- ^b – Esteban Ocon qualified 12th, but he was required to start the race from the pit lane as the setup of the suspension was changed while the car was under parc fermé.
- ^c – Nico Hülkenberg qualified 17th, but he was required to start the race from the pit lane as the setup of the suspension was changed while the car was under parc fermé.
- ^d – Nyck de Vries failed to set a time within the 107% requirement. He was permitted to race at the stewards' discretion.

== Sprint shootout ==
The sprint shootout was held on 29 April 2023 at 12:30 local time (UTC+4) and determined the starting order for the Sprint race.

=== Sprint shootout report ===
The first segment saw Zhou, Bottas, Tsunoda, Gasly and de Vries knocked out. About one minute before the session was to finish, Logan Sargeant, who was seventh, hit the wall with the rear of his car at turn 15, damaging the suspension and rear wing. Due to damage to his car, Sargeant could not continue participating in the second part of the session, which prevented him from setting a time in the second segment and left him in the 15th position in the session. Sargeant was later withdrawn from the sprint due to car damage. The session was red-flagged twenty-five seconds to go and ended prematurely. Following the first segment, Gasly's car was reported to suffer from an exhaust leak.

The second segment saw Piastri, Hülkenberg, Ocon, Magnussen and Sargeant knocked out. Two yellow flags were waved during the session; Hülkenberg locked up at turn 7 and nearly touched the wall, and Sainz also locked up at turn 15. Towards the end of the session, Alonso gave his teammate Stroll a tow down the pit straight, greatly assisting his lap time. Due to a lack of new soft tyres, Norris could not participate in the third session.

Leclerc managed to secure pole position for the sprint ahead of Pérez and Verstappen, despite locking up and crashing out in turn 5 on his last lap.

=== Sprint shootout classification ===
Pos.	No.	Driver	Constructor	Qualifying times			Sprint grid
Pos.	No.	Driver	Constructor	SQ1	SQ2	SQ3	Sprint grid
1	16	(Monaco) Charles Leclerc	Ferrari	1:42.820	1:42.500	1:41.697	1
2	11	(Mexico) Sergio Pérez	Red Bull Racing-Honda RBPT	1:43.858	1:42.925	1:41.844	2
3	1	(Netherlands) Max Verstappen	Red Bull Racing-Honda RBPT	1:43.288	1:42.417	1:41.987	3
4	63	(United Kingdom) George Russell	Mercedes	1:43.763	1:43.112	1:42.252	4
5	55	(Spain) Carlos Sainz Jr.	Ferrari	1:43.622	1:42.909	1:42.287	5
6	44	(United Kingdom) Lewis Hamilton	Mercedes	1:43.561	1:43.061	1:42.502	6
7	23	(Thailand) Alexander Albon	Williams-Mercedes	1:43.987	1:43.376	1:42.846	7
8	14	(Spain) Fernando Alonso	Aston Martin Aramco-Mercedes	1:43.789	1:42.976	1:43.010	8
9	18	(Canada) Lance Stroll	Aston Martin Aramco-Mercedes	1:43.879	1:43.375	1:43.064	9
10	4	(United Kingdom) Lando Norris	McLaren-Mercedes	1:43.938	1:43.395	No time^{a}	10
11	81	(Australia) Oscar Piastri	McLaren-Mercedes	1:44.179	1:43.427	N/A	11
12	27	(Germany) Nico Hülkenberg	Haas-Ferrari	1:44.843	1:43.806	N/A	12
13	31	(France) Esteban Ocon	Alpine-Renault	1:44.433	1:44.088	N/A	PL^{b}
14	20	(Denmark) Kevin Magnussen	Haas-Ferrari	1:44.101	1:44.332	N/A	13
15	2	(United States) Logan Sargeant	Williams-Mercedes	1:44.042	No time	N/A	—^{c}
16	24	(China) Zhou Guanyu	Alfa Romeo-Ferrari	1:45.177	N/A	N/A	14
17	77	(Finland) Valtteri Bottas	Alfa Romeo-Ferrari	1:45.352	N/A	N/A	15
18	22	(Japan) Yuki Tsunoda	AlphaTauri-Honda RBPT	1:45.436	N/A	N/A	16
19	10	(France) Pierre Gasly	Alpine-Renault	1:46.951	N/A	N/A	17
20	21	(Netherlands) Nyck de Vries	AlphaTauri-Honda RBPT	1:48.180	N/A	N/A	18
107% time: 1:48.617

Notes

- ^a – Lando Norris could not set a time during SQ3 as he did not have a new set of soft tyres which were mandatory for the segment.
- ^b – Esteban Ocon qualified 13th, but he was required to start the sprint from the pit lane as the setup of the suspension was changed while the car was under parc fermé.
- ^c – Logan Sargeant qualified 15th, but he did not take part in the sprint following a request made by the team to withdraw the car due to a crash. The drivers who qualified behind him gained one grid position each.

== Sprint ==
The sprint was held on 29 April 2023 at 17:30 local time (UTC+4).

=== Sprint report ===
Sprint polesitter Charles Leclerc got a good start off the line to take the lead of the race. Max Verstappen and George Russell made contact going into turn 2, Russell inflicting damage to Verstappen's car and passing him for third place. Behind them, Fernando Alonso passed Alexander Albon for seventh place. As he went into turn 13, Yuki Tsunoda hit the wall, stripping the rear-left tyre off his AlphaTauri; the stricken tyre rolled down the track and debris was strewn around that corner, causing a virtual safety car to be called out. Tsunoda limped back into the pits to replace the tyre, though his damaged car was released in an unsafe condition with the rear wheels geometry being visibly off; he would retire the following lap. The virtual safety car period transitioned to a full safety car period to clear the debris left by Tsunoda's car. During this period, Esteban Ocon went into the pits to switch to a set of soft tyres.

On lap five, the safety car period ended; as the cars went into turn 1, Verstappen passed Russell for third, and Lewis Hamilton would drop two places behind Carlos Sainz Jr. and Alonso. The DRS was enabled on lap seven, giving Sergio Pérez the opportunity to pass Leclerc on the main straight; he kept the lead until the end of the race. Lando Norris pitted after lap 10, switching to the medium compound; soon afterward Ocon switched to new softs. Pérez pulled away from second-placed Leclerc, who was now being pressured by Verstappen in third; by lap 17, Pérez had a 4.7 second gap ahead of Leclerc. Verstappen finished in third; Russell went home in fourth.

=== Sprint classification ===
Pos.	No.	Driver	Constructor	Laps	Time/Retired	Grid	Points
1	11	(Mexico) Sergio Pérez	Red Bull Racing-Honda RBPT	17	33:17.667	2	8
2	16	(Monaco) Charles Leclerc	Ferrari	17	+4.463	1	7
3	1	(Netherlands) Max Verstappen	Red Bull Racing-Honda RBPT	17	+5.065	3	6
4	63	(United Kingdom) George Russell	Mercedes	17	+8.532	4	5
5	55	(Spain) Carlos Sainz Jr.	Ferrari	17	+10.388	5	4
6	14	(Spain) Fernando Alonso	Aston Martin Aramco-Mercedes	17	+11.613	8	3
7	44	(United Kingdom) Lewis Hamilton	Mercedes	17	+16.503	6	2
8	18	(Canada) Lance Stroll	Aston Martin Aramco-Mercedes	17	+18.417	9	1
9	23	(Thailand) Alexander Albon	Williams-Mercedes	17	+21.757	7	
10	81	(Australia) Oscar Piastri	McLaren-Mercedes	17	+22.851	11	
11	20	(Denmark) Kevin Magnussen	Haas-Ferrari	17	+27.990	13	
12	24	(China) Zhou Guanyu	Alfa Romeo-Ferrari	17	+34.602	14	
13	10	(France) Pierre Gasly	Alpine-Renault	17	+36.918	17	
14	21	(Netherlands) Nyck de Vries	AlphaTauri-Honda RBPT	17	+41.626	18	
15	27	(Germany) Nico Hülkenberg	Haas-Ferrari	17	+48.587	12	
16	77	(Finland) Valtteri Bottas	Alfa Romeo-Ferrari	17	+49.917	15	
17	4	(United Kingdom) Lando Norris	McLaren-Mercedes	17	+51.104	10	
18	31	(France) Esteban Ocon	Alpine-Renault	17	+1:00.621	PL	
Ret	22	(Japan) Yuki Tsunoda	AlphaTauri-Honda RBPT	2	Suspension	16	
WD	2	(United States) Logan Sargeant	Williams-Mercedes	0	Withdrew	—^{a}	
Fastest lap: (Mexico) Sergio Pérez (Red Bull Racing-Honda RBPT) – 1:43.616 (lap 11)

Notes

- ^a – Logan Sargeant did not take part in the sprint following a request made by the team to withdraw the car due to a crash in the sprint shootout. The drivers who qualified behind him gained one grid position each.

== Race ==
The race was held on 30 April 2023 at 15:00 local time (UTC+4).

=== Race report ===
Polesitter Charles Leclerc led the race until lap four; Alexander Albon and Oscar Piastri made contact coming into turn 2, inflicting damage to the Williams' wing. The contact was investigated and no further action was taken. The DRS was enabled on lap three, with Max Verstappen utilising it to pass Leclerc into the first corner on the following lap. Sergio Pérez would repeat the same move on lap six to take second place. Pierre Gasly entered the pit lane on lap six to switch to the hard compound.

As lap ten concluded, Verstappen went into the pit lane to switch tyres, exiting in third position, but he would lose the effective lead of the race, as Nyck de Vries' retirement would cause a yellow flag and subsequent safety car; he had clipped the inside wall at turn 5 and come to a stop at turn 6. During the safety car period, Pérez changed onto a fresh hard compound and subsequently took the lead of the race, with Leclerc also switching to the hards. George Russell also benefited from the safety car, jumping Lance Stroll and taking sixth place. Russell's entry into the pit lane was investigated by race control, with no further action required. Zhou Guanyu retired on lap 39 following mechanical problems.

Pérez, Verstappen and Leclerc would be the top three drivers for the rest of the race as Pérez took his second Azerbaijan Grand Prix victory. This was Leclerc and Ferrari's first podium finish of the season. Leading Lando Norris in ninth place by almost 30 seconds, George Russell took advantage of the opportunity to make a late pit stop from eighth for a fresh set of tyres, enabling him to claim a point for fastest lap.

=== Pit lane safety issues ===
During the final lap of the race, an incident occurred where FIA-appointed personnel allowed photographers to cross into the fast lane of the pits to prepare to photograph the parc fermé and podium celebrations, even though the race was still active. Alpine driver Esteban Ocon was forced to avoid several photographers whilst coming in for his pit stop. As a result, the race stewards launched an investigation into the matter and, subsequently, recommended that changes be made to end of race parc fermé procedures to prevent a repeat of the occurrence.

=== Race classification ===
Pos.	No.	Driver	Constructor	Laps	Time/Retired	Grid	Points
1	11	(Mexico) Sergio Pérez	Red Bull Racing-Honda RBPT	51	1:32:42.436	3	25
2	1	(Netherlands) Max Verstappen	Red Bull Racing-Honda RBPT	51	+2.137	2	18
3	16	(Monaco) Charles Leclerc	Ferrari	51	+21.217	1	15
4	14	(Spain) Fernando Alonso	Aston Martin Aramco-Mercedes	51	+22.024	6	12
5	55	(Spain) Carlos Sainz Jr.	Ferrari	51	+45.491	4	10
6	44	(United Kingdom) Lewis Hamilton	Mercedes	51	+46.145	5	8
7	18	(Canada) Lance Stroll	Aston Martin Aramco-Mercedes	51	+51.617	9	6
8	63	(United Kingdom) George Russell	Mercedes	51	+1:14.240	11	5^{e}
9	4	(United Kingdom) Lando Norris	McLaren-Mercedes	51	+1:20.376	7	2
10	22	(Japan) Yuki Tsunoda	AlphaTauri-Honda RBPT	51	+1:23.862	8	1
11	81	(Australia) Oscar Piastri	McLaren-Mercedes	51	+1:26.501	10	
12	23	(Thailand) Alexander Albon	Williams-Mercedes	51	+1:28.623	12	
13	20	(Denmark) Kevin Magnussen	Haas-Ferrari	51	+1:29.729	16	
14	10	(France) Pierre Gasly	Alpine-Renault	51	+1:31.332	17	
15	31	(France) Esteban Ocon	Alpine-Renault	51	+1:37.794	PL	
16	2	(United States) Logan Sargeant	Williams-Mercedes	51	+1:40.943	14	
17	27	(Germany) Nico Hülkenberg	Haas-Ferrari	50	+1 lap	PL	
18	77	(Finland) Valtteri Bottas	Alfa Romeo-Ferrari	50	+1 lap	13	
Ret	24	(China) Zhou Guanyu	Alfa Romeo-Ferrari	36	Overheating	15	
Ret	21	(Netherlands) Nyck de Vries	AlphaTauri-Honda RBPT	9	Accident	18	
Fastest lap: (United Kingdom) George Russell (Mercedes) – 1:43.370 (lap 51)

Notes

- ^e – one point for fastest lap.

== Championship standings after the race ==
Drivers' Championship standings

Pos.	Driver	Points
1	(Netherlands) Max Verstappen	93
2	(Mexico) Sergio Pérez	87
3	(Spain) Fernando Alonso	60
4	(United Kingdom) Lewis Hamilton	48
5	(Spain) Carlos Sainz Jr.	34

Constructors' Championship standings

Pos.	Constructor	Points
1	(Austria) Red Bull Racing-Honda RBPT	180
2	(United Kingdom) Aston Martin Aramco-Mercedes	87
3	(Germany) Mercedes	76
4	(Italy) Ferrari	62
5	(United Kingdom) McLaren-Mercedes	14

- Note: Only the top five positions are included for both sets of standings.

== See also ==
- 2023 Baku Formula 2 round

== Notes ==
Previous race: 2023 Australian Grand Prix	FIA Formula One World Championship; 2023 season	Next race: 2023 Miami Grand Prix
Previous race: 2022 Azerbaijan Grand Prix	Azerbaijan Grand Prix	Next race: 2024 Azerbaijan Grand Prix
