= 2017 Azerbaijan Grand Prix =

2017 Formula 1 race

Race 8 of 20 in the 2017 Formula One World Championship
← Previous race	Next race →
- Layout of the Baku City Circuit

Race details
- Date: 25 June 2017
- Official name: Formula 1 FlyEmirates Azerbaijan Grand Prix
- Location: Baku City Circuit; Baku, Azerbaijan
- Course: Temporary street circuit
- Course length: 6.003 km (3.730 miles)
- Distance: 51 laps, 306.049 km (190.170 miles)
- Weather: Sunny
- Attendance: 71,451

Pole position
Driver	(United Kingdom) Lewis Hamilton	Mercedes
- Time: 1:40.593

Fastest lap
Driver	(Germany) Sebastian Vettel	Ferrari
- Time: 1:43.441 on lap 47

Podium
First	(Australia) Daniel Ricciardo	Red Bull Racing-TAG Heuer
Second	(Finland) Valtteri Bottas	Mercedes
Third	(Canada) Lance Stroll	Williams-Mercedes

The 2017 Azerbaijan Grand Prix (officially the 2017 Formula 1 Azerbaijan Grand Prix) was a Formula One motor race that was held on 25 June 2017 at the Baku City Circuit in Baku, Azerbaijan. The race was the eighth round of the 2017 FIA Formula One World Championship, and was the maiden running of the Azerbaijan Grand Prix as a round of the Formula One World Championship. It was the second time that a race was held at the circuit and the second time that a Grand Prix was held in Azerbaijan. (Note: The Baku City Circuit previously hosted the 2016 European Grand Prix before the event became the Azerbaijan Grand Prix ahead of the 2017 season.)

Ferrari driver Sebastian Vettel entered the round with a twelve-point lead over Mercedes's Lewis Hamilton in the World Drivers' Championship, while Mercedes led Ferrari by eight points in the World Constructors' Championship. Lewis Hamilton started the race from pole. Red Bull Racing's Daniel Ricciardo recovered from a crash in qualifying to claim his fifth career victory ahead of the Mercedes of Valtteri Bottas, while Lance Stroll became the first Canadian to stand on the podium since Jacques Villeneuve at the 2001 German Grand Prix, and the second youngest driver ever to finish on the podium. This would be the last podium for a Williams driver until the 2021 Belgian Grand Prix.

This was also the last race to feature a red flag until the 2020 Italian Grand Prix.

== Report ==
=== Free practice ===
Red Bull's Max Verstappen went fastest in first practice, setting a time of 1.44:410. He was followed by his teammate Daniel Ricciardo in second with the Ferrari of Sebastian Vettel in third. In second practice the Red Bull of Max Verstappen was fastest (despite crashing heavily into the barriers at Turn 1 in the closing stages of FP2) followed by Bottas and Ricciardo. Saturday's third and final practice was topped by Bottas, with Kimi Räikkönen second and Hamilton third. Bottas set the quickest time of all three practices with a 1.42.742.

=== Qualifying ===
Jolyon Palmer failed to set a lap time in Q1 due to a fire during Practice 3.

In Q3, Lewis Hamilton secured pole position with a 1:40.593, 0.434 seconds quicker than teammate Bottas in second, and 1.100 seconds quicker than Räikkönen in third. Lance Stroll out-qualified teammate Felipe Massa for the first time in the season. Daniel Ricciardo hit the wall and started in tenth.

=== Race ===
Hamilton led from the start, followed by Bottas, Räikkönen and Vettel. Daniil Kvyat ran wide at turn 1. As he was returning to the track, his teammate Carlos Sainz Jr. spun off, to avoid a collision. In corner 3 of the first lap, both Finnish drivers (Bottas and Räikkönen) collided, causing a puncture in Bottas's front right tyre. Vettel took advantage to seize second place, followed by Sergio Pérez and Max Verstappen. Bottas was forced to stop in the pits, falling one lap behind the leaders.

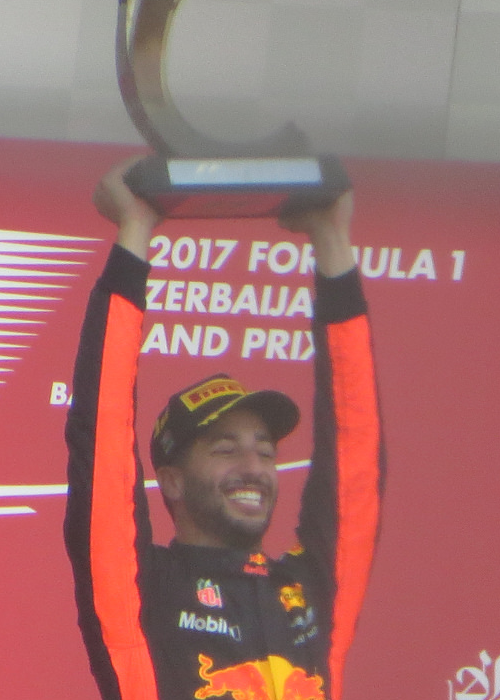
Daniel Ricciardo on the podium with the winner's trophy

Ricciardo pitted on lap 6 to remove debris from his brakes. He rejoined in 17th place. His teammate Verstappen had to retire due to an issue with his engine on lap 12. Hamilton led Vettel until the first safety car was deployed on the same lap to remove the stranded Toro Rosso of Daniil Kvyat. This safety car period allowed Bottas to unlap himself. On lap 17, racing resumed but another safety car was deployed almost immediately to clear more debris off the track, which came from Räikkönen's Ferrari.

During both safety car periods, Hamilton repeatedly complained that the safety car was moving too slowly. On lap 19 whilst still under safety car conditions Vettel ran into the back of Hamilton, damaging his front wing and Hamilton's rear diffuser. He then drove alongside Hamilton and swerved into his car, to protest what he believed was Hamilton brake-testing him. However, TV replays and car data showed that Hamilton had not applied his brakes at any point during the first collision. The race stewards put the incident under investigation. Racing resumed on lap 20 with Felipe Massa moving up to third and pressurizing Vettel, but within a few corners, the Force Indias of Esteban Ocon and Sergio Pérez collided and left debris on the track. The collision gave Ocon a puncture and dropped him to the back of the field. Pérez lost his front wing, and suffered damage to the front left wishbone which forced him to retire after making his way to the pit lane. Räikkönen, who was following the two Force Indias closely, got a puncture as a result of debris from the crash, and after the broken tire caused damage to the floor of his car as well as his rear wing, he too was pushed to his garage to retire. A third safety car was then deployed almost immediately, and after Fernando Alonso complained over the radio about the amount of debris, the race was red-flagged on lap 22 so that marshals could clear the track.

During the red-flag period, which lasted over 20 minutes, teams worked on their cars. Force India replaced Ocon's tyres and Ferrari replaced Vettel's front wing. Mercedes worked on Hamilton's rear diffuser, which only had minor cosmetic damage. Other drivers got out of their cars and talked to their engineers and team principals. The previously retired cars of Räikkönen and Pérez were also being worked on by their teams in their garages. Works were completed in time and both drivers were allowed to rejoin the race, albeit a lap down.

After the track was cleared of debris, the race was restarted behind the safety car. Hamilton led at the restart from Vettel, Massa, Stroll, and Ricciardo. Ricciardo passed both Williams cars at turn 1 and settled into third place. Massa however was struggling with an issue on his Williams, the front suspension shaking violently at high speed. Kevin Magnussen in the uncompetitive Haas managed to take advantage of Massa's issue and a lax Nico Hülkenberg to overtake both for 5th place whilst Massa was easily passed by the entire field. Hülkenberg then collided with the wall on lap 25 and was forced to retire from 6th place with suspension damage. On the next lap, Massa retired due to the problem with his car, which turned out to be a broken suspension damper.

By lap 29 Hamilton, Vettel, Ricciardo and Lance Stroll had managed to pull away from the rest of the field and built a gap of more than 10 seconds back to Magnussen in 5th. But on this lap, the headrest on Hamilton's car suddenly became loose. He initially tried to fix it himself by pushing it back into its position, but on lap 31 he was forced by race control to pit for safety reasons. On the same lap, Vettel was given a 10-second stop/go penalty for dangerous driving, for his incident with Hamilton. Vettel served his penalty on lap 33, rejoining the track in 7th place just ahead of Hamilton, who became stuck in traffic following his unscheduled stop. This meant the lead was gifted to Ricciardo ahead of Stroll, with Kevin Magnussen third. The group of faster drivers consisting of Ocon, Bottas, Vettel and Hamilton started chasing the leaders, overtaking Alonso and Magnussen relatively comfortably. Bottas would then clear Ocon to move into third and a podium position, having come back from a lap down. Räikkönen and Pérez were both given drive-through penalties since during the red-flag period their cars were being worked on in their garages instead of the pit lane. Both drivers eventually retired from the race.

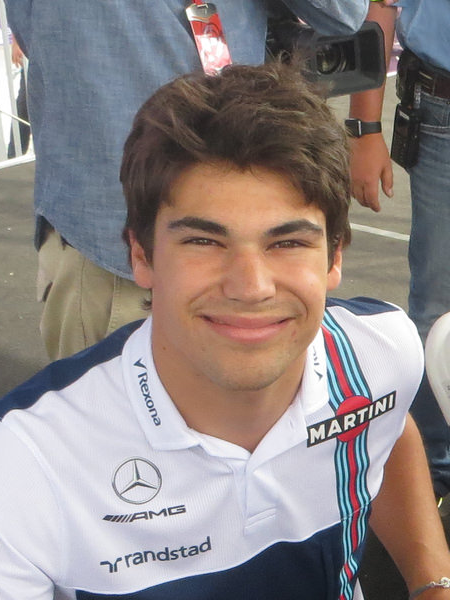
Lance Stroll, second youngest podium finisher

With Ricciardo comfortably in the lead, Stroll had a 12-second advantage over Bottas, Vettel and Hamilton, but was being caught rapidly. Hamilton asked for team orders to be applied and for Bottas to help him overtake Vettel by slowing his pace, but the team refused since Bottas still had a good chance of catching Stroll in the closing laps. The Saubers of Marcus Ericsson and Pascal Wehrlein collided as they were fighting for 10th place, but both drivers managed to continue without major damage. At the chequered flag, Ricciardo cruised to victory, taking Red Bull's first win in the 2017 season. Bottas then managed to pass Stroll on the start–finish straight just metres from the line, taking second place by 0.105 seconds. However, Stroll still picked up his maiden podium finish in third, becoming the second-youngest driver to finish in the top three. Vettel finished in fourth, Hamilton in fifth, Ocon in sixth, Magnussen in seventh, Sainz in eighth, Alonso in ninth (scoring McLaren's first points of the season), and Wehrlein in tenth. In all, nine different constructors scored points.

As a result of the race, Vettel increased his lead over Hamilton in the World Drivers' Championship to 14 points, while Mercedes increased their lead over Ferrari in the World Constructors' Championship to 24 points.

== Classification ==
=== Qualifying ===
Pos.	Car no.	Driver	Constructor	Qualifying times			Final grid
Pos.	Car no.	Driver	Constructor	Q1	Q2	Q3	Final grid
1	44	(United Kingdom) Lewis Hamilton	Mercedes	1:41.983	1:41.275	1:40.593	1
2	77	(Finland) Valtteri Bottas	Mercedes	1:43.026	1:41.502	1:41.027	2
3	7	(Finland) Kimi Räikkönen	Ferrari	1:42.678	1:42.090	1:41.693	3
4	5	(Germany) Sebastian Vettel	Ferrari	1:42.952	1:41.911	1:41.841	4
5	33	(Netherlands) Max Verstappen	Red Bull Racing-TAG Heuer	1:42.544	1:41.961	1:41.879	5
6	11	(Mexico) Sergio Pérez	Force India-Mercedes	1:43.162	1:42.467	1:42.111	6
7	31	(France) Esteban Ocon	Force India-Mercedes	1:43.051	1:42.751	1:42.186	7
8	18	(Canada) Lance Stroll	Williams-Mercedes	1:43.613	1:42.284	1:42.753	8
9	19	(Brazil) Felipe Massa	Williams-Mercedes	1:43.165	1:42.735	1:42.798	9
10	3	(Australia) Daniel Ricciardo	Red Bull Racing-TAG Heuer	1:42.857	1:42.215	1:43.414	10
11	26	(Russia) Daniil Kvyat	Toro Rosso	1:42.927	1:43.186		11
12	55	(Spain) Carlos Sainz Jr.	Toro Rosso	1:43.489	1:43.347		15^{1}
13	20	(Denmark) Kevin Magnussen	Haas-Ferrari	1:44.029	1:43.796		12
14	27	(Germany) Nico Hülkenberg	Renault	1:43.930	1:44.267		13
15	94	(Germany) Pascal Wehrlein	Sauber-Ferrari	1:44.317	1:44.603		14
16	14	(Spain) Fernando Alonso	McLaren-Honda	1:44.334			19^{2}
17	8	(France) Romain Grosjean	Haas-Ferrari	1:44.468			16
18	9	(Sweden) Marcus Ericsson	Sauber-Ferrari	1:44.795			17
19	2	(Belgium) Stoffel Vandoorne	McLaren-Honda	1:45.030			18^{3}
107% time: 1:49.121
—	30	(United Kingdom) Jolyon Palmer	Renault	No time			20^{4}

Notes

- ^1 – Carlos Sainz Jr. received a three-place grid penalty for causing a collision with Felipe Massa at the previous race.
- ^2 – Fernando Alonso received a forty-place grid penalty for exceeding his quota of power unit components.
- ^3 – Stoffel Vandoorne received a thirty-place grid penalty for exceeding his quota of power unit components and a five-place grid penalty for an unscheduled gearbox change.
- ^4 – Jolyon Palmer failed to set a lap time in Q1, and was allowed to race at the discretion of the stewards.

=== Race classification ===
Pos.	No.	Driver	Constructor	Laps	Time/Retired	Grid	Points
1	3	(Australia) Daniel Ricciardo	Red Bull Racing-TAG Heuer	51	2:03:55.573	10	25
2	77	(Finland) Valtteri Bottas	Mercedes	51	+3.904	2	18
3	18	(Canada) Lance Stroll	Williams-Mercedes	51	+4.009	8	15
4	5	(Germany) Sebastian Vettel	Ferrari	51	+5.976	4	12
5	44	(United Kingdom) Lewis Hamilton	Mercedes	51	+6.188	1	10
6	31	(France) Esteban Ocon	Force India-Mercedes	51	+30.298	7	8
7	20	(Denmark) Kevin Magnussen	Haas-Ferrari	51	+41.753	12	6
8	55	(Spain) Carlos Sainz Jr.	Toro Rosso	51	+49.400	15	4
9	14	(Spain) Fernando Alonso	McLaren-Honda	51	+59.551	19	2
10	94	(Germany) Pascal Wehrlein	Sauber-Ferrari	51	+1:29.093	14	1
11	9	(Sweden) Marcus Ericsson	Sauber-Ferrari	51	+1:31.794	17	
12	2	(Belgium) Stoffel Vandoorne	McLaren-Honda	51	+1:32.160	18	
13	8	(France) Romain Grosjean	Haas-Ferrari	50	+1 Lap	16	
14^{1}	7	(Finland) Kimi Räikkönen	Ferrari	46	Collision damage	3	
Ret	11	(Mexico) Sergio Pérez	Force India-Mercedes	39	Collision damage	6	
Ret	19	(Brazil) Felipe Massa	Williams-Mercedes	25	Suspension	9	
Ret	27	(Germany) Nico Hülkenberg	Renault	24	Accident	13	
Ret	33	(Netherlands) Max Verstappen	Red Bull Racing-TAG Heuer	12	Engine	5	
Ret	26	(Russia) Daniil Kvyat	Toro Rosso	9	Electrical	11	
Ret	30	(United Kingdom) Jolyon Palmer	Renault	7	Engine	20	

Notes

- ^1 – Kimi Räikkönen retired from the race, but was classified as he had completed 90% of the winner's race distance.

== Championship standings after the race ==
Drivers' Championship standings

	Pos.	Driver	Points
	1	(Germany) Sebastian Vettel	153
	2	(United Kingdom) Lewis Hamilton	139
	3	(Finland) Valtteri Bottas	111
1	4	(Australia) Daniel Ricciardo	92
1	5	(Finland) Kimi Räikkönen	73

Constructors' Championship standings

	Pos.	Constructor	Points
	1	(Germany) Mercedes	250
	2	(Italy) Ferrari	226
	3	(Austria) Red Bull Racing-TAG Heuer	137
	4	Force India-Mercedes	79
1	5	(United Kingdom) Williams-Mercedes	37

- Note: Only the top five positions are included for both sets of standings.

== See also ==
- 2017 Baku Formula 2 round

== Notes ==
Previous race: 2017 Canadian Grand Prix	FIA Formula One World Championship; 2017 season	Next race: 2017 Austrian Grand Prix
Previous race: None; Previous race at the Baku City Circuit: 2016 European Grand Prix	Azerbaijan Grand Prix	Next race: 2018 Azerbaijan Grand Prix
