= Azerbaijan Grand Prix =

Formula One race

- Baku City Circuit

Race information
- Number of times held: 9
- First held: 2017 (Note: The 2016 Grand Prix at the Baku City Circuit was an edition of the European Grand Prix.)
- Most wins (drivers): (Mexico) Sergio Pérez (Netherlands) Max Verstappen (2)
- Most wins (constructors): (Austria) Red Bull Racing (5)
- Circuit length: 6.003 km (3.730 miles)
- Race length: 306.042 km (190.166 miles)
- Laps: 51

Last race (2026)

Pole position
- (United Kingdom) George Russell; Mercedes; 1:42.526

Podium
- 1. (United Kingdom) G. Russell; Mercedes; 1:38:02.143; 2. (Netherlands) M. Verstappen; Red Bull Racing-Red Bull Ford; +0.196; 3. (France) I. Hadjar; Red Bull Racing-Red Bull Ford; +10.704

Fastest lap
- (United Kingdom) George Russell; Mercedes; 1:44.916

The Azerbaijan Grand Prix (Azerbaijani: Azərbaycan Qran Prisi) is a Formula One motor racing event that was held for the first time in 2017. It is held on the Baku City Circuit, a street circuit in Baku, the capital of Azerbaijan.

The event is due to take place at the Baku City Circuit until at least 2030.

== History ==
The first Formula One Grand Prix to be held in Azerbaijan was the 2016 European Grand Prix, which took place at the Baku City Circuit. A year later, in 2017, the same venue hosted the first Azerbaijan Grand Prix. The race was held on 25 June and was one of five races to be held on a street circuit during the 2017 Formula One season, along with the Singapore, Monaco, Australian and Canadian Grands Prix. The winner of the first Azerbaijan Grand Prix was Daniel Ricciardo of Red Bull, who scored his first win of the season.

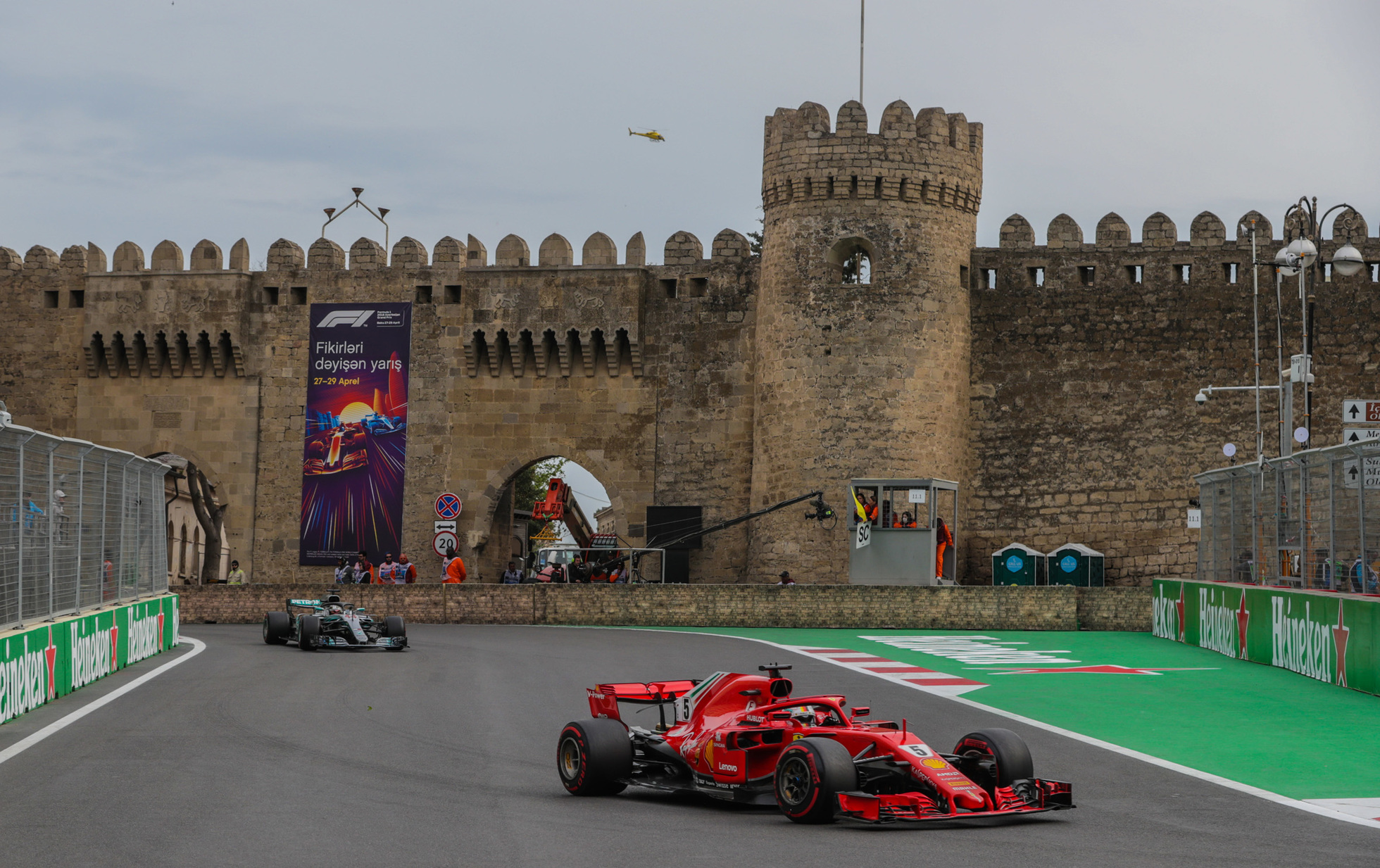
The 2018 Azerbaijan Grand Prix and Baku city walls behind

The 2018 Azerbaijan Grand Prix took place on 29 April as the 4th round of the season and was won by Lewis Hamilton.

The 2019 Azerbaijan Grand Prix was held on 28 April as the 4th round of the season and was won by Valtteri Bottas. In March 2020, the 2020 race was postponed due to the COVID-19 pandemic, before being cancelled later in the year. The 2021 Azerbaijan Grand Prix featured as the 6th round of the season, and the race was won by Sergio Pérez after Max Verstappen, who led a majority of the race, was struck by tyre failure. The 2022 Azerbaijan Grand Prix was won by Verstappen.

The 2023 Azerbaijan Grand Prix became the first Grand Prix to implement a new format, featuring a new qualifying session called "sprint shootout" which determined the grid for one of the six sprints in the 2023 season. Sergio Pérez became the first driver to win the Azerbaijan Grand Prix twice, following his win in 2021, securing a victory in the race and also in the sprint. For the 2024 event, the Azerbaijan Grand Prix was moved to September, swapping positions with the Japanese Grand Prix.

The 2026 Azerbaijan Grand Prix was held on a Saturday following a request from the promoter and relevant government stakeholders to accommodate their Remembrance Day. It was won by George Russell, driving for Mercedes, who took his first career Grand Slam.

== Winners ==
=== By year ===
Year	Driver	Constructor	Report
2017	(Australia) Daniel Ricciardo	Red Bull Racing-TAG Heuer	Report
2018	(United Kingdom) Lewis Hamilton	Mercedes	Report
2019	(Finland) Valtteri Bottas	Mercedes	Report
2020	Not held due to COVID-19 pandemic		
2021	(Mexico) Sergio Pérez	Red Bull Racing-Honda	Report
2022	(Netherlands) Max Verstappen	Red Bull Racing-RBPT	Report
2023	(Mexico) Sergio Pérez	Red Bull Racing-Honda RBPT	Report
2024	(Australia) Oscar Piastri	McLaren-Mercedes	Report
2025	(Netherlands) Max Verstappen	Red Bull Racing-Honda RBPT	Report
2026	(United Kingdom) George Russell	Mercedes	Report

=== Repeat winners (drivers) ===
Drivers in bold are competing in the Formula One championship in 2026.

Wins	Driver	Years won
2	**(Mexico) Sergio Pérez**	2021, 2023
2	(Netherlands) **Max Verstappen**	2022, 2025

=== Repeat winners (constructors) ===
Teams in bold are competing in the Formula One championship in 2026.

Wins	Constructor	Years won
5	(Austria) **Red Bull Racing**	2017, 2021, 2022, 2023, 2025
3	(Germany) **Mercedes**	2018, 2019, 2026

=== Repeat winners (engine manufacturers) ===
Manufacturers in bold are competing in the Formula One championship in 2026.

Wins	Manufacturer	Years won
4	(Germany) **Mercedes**	2018, 2019, 2024, 2026
2	(Japan) Honda RBPT	2023, 2025
