= 2016 Baku GP2 Series round =

Motor race

(Azerbaijan) 2016 Baku GP2 round
Round details
- Round 3 of 11 rounds in the 2016 GP2 Series
- Layout of the Baku City Circuit
- Location: Baku City Circuit, Baku, Azerbaijan
- Course: Street circuit 6.003 km (3.730 mi)

GP2 Series

Feature race
- Date: 18 June 2016
- Laps: 26

Pole position
Driver	(Italy) Antonio Giovinazzi	Prema Racing
- Time: 1:51.752

Podium
First	(Italy) Antonio Giovinazzi	Prema Racing
Second	(Russia) Sergey Sirotkin	ART Grand Prix
Third	(Italy) Raffaele Marciello	Russian Time

Fastest lap
Driver	(Japan) Nobuharu Matsushita	ART Grand Prix
- Time: 1:56.086 (on lap 18)

Sprint race
- Date: 19 June 2016
- Laps: 21

Podium
First	(Italy) Antonio Giovinazzi	Prema Racing
Second	(France) Pierre Gasly	Prema Racing
Third	(Russia) Sergey Sirotkin	ART Grand Prix

Fastest lap
Driver	(Italy) Antonio Giovinazzi	Prema Racing
- Time: 1:54.792 (on lap 16)

The 2016 Baku GP2 Series round was a pair of motor races held on 18 and 19 June 2016 at the Baku City Circuit in Azerbaijan as part of the GP2 Series. It was the third round of the 2016 GP2 Series and was run in support of the 2016 European Grand Prix. The first race, a 26-lap feature event, was won by Prema Racing driver Antonio Giovinazzi from pole position. Sergey Sirotkin finished second for ART Grand Prix, and Russian Time driver Raffaele Marciello took third. Giovinazzi won the shorter 21-lap sprint race from teammate Pierre Gasly in second and Sirotkin third.

Giovinazzi made a slow start in the first race and lost the lead to Nobuharu Matsushita. The event was affected by four safety car periods which closed the field up and forced a time limit. Matsushita lost the lead to Marciello who later held off Matsushita for the position. Giovinazzi recovered and caught up to Marciello and passed him on the 18th lap. He stayed in the lead for the rest of the race to achieve his and Prema's first GP2 Series victory. In the second race, Daniël de Jong started from pole position but lost the lead to Matsushita. De Jong held off de Jong and Oliver Rowland for the lead after a slow restart. Gasly became the leader when Marciello and Matsushita collided and held it until Giovinazzi passed him to win the race.

Giovinazzi became the first driver since Davide Valsecchi in 2012 Bahrain to win both races in a GP2 Series race weekend. The round gave Artem Markelov the Drivers' Championship lead with 54 points, while previous leader Norman Nato fellow to second following sub-par results. Giovinazzi's victory moved him to third place, one point ahead of Gasly. Russian Time remained the leaders of the Teams' Championship on 97 points, eight ahead of second-placed Prema Racing. Racing Engineering were in third position on 73 points, with seven rounds left in the season.

== Background ==
The 2016 Baku GP2 Series round was the third of eleven scheduled events of the 2016 GP2 Series season. It was held on 18 and 19 June 2016 at the Baku City Circuit in Baku and supported the 2016 European Grand Prix. Tyre supplier Pirelli brought two types of tyre to the race: two dry-compounds (supersoft "options" and medium "primes"). The supersoft tyres were identified by a red stripe on their side-walls, and the medium tyres were similarly identified with white. The drag reduction system (DRS) had two activation zones for the race: one was on the start/finish straight linking the final and first corners, and the second on the straight from the second and third turns. A total of 11 teams fielded 2 drivers each making up 22 participants for the round and every competitor used the Dallara GP2/11 car.

Before the race, Racing Engineering driver Norman Nato led the Drivers' Championship with 49 points, one ahead of Artem Markelov, who in turn, was a further seven points in front of Alex Lynn in third. Pierre Gasly was fourth on 33 points, and Raffaele Marciello was fifth on 28. Russian Time were leading the Teams' Championship with 76 points; Racing Engineering were four points ahead of DAMS in the battle for second place. Prema Racing were in fourth on 33 points, and Carlin rounded out the top five on 28.

== Practice and qualifying ==
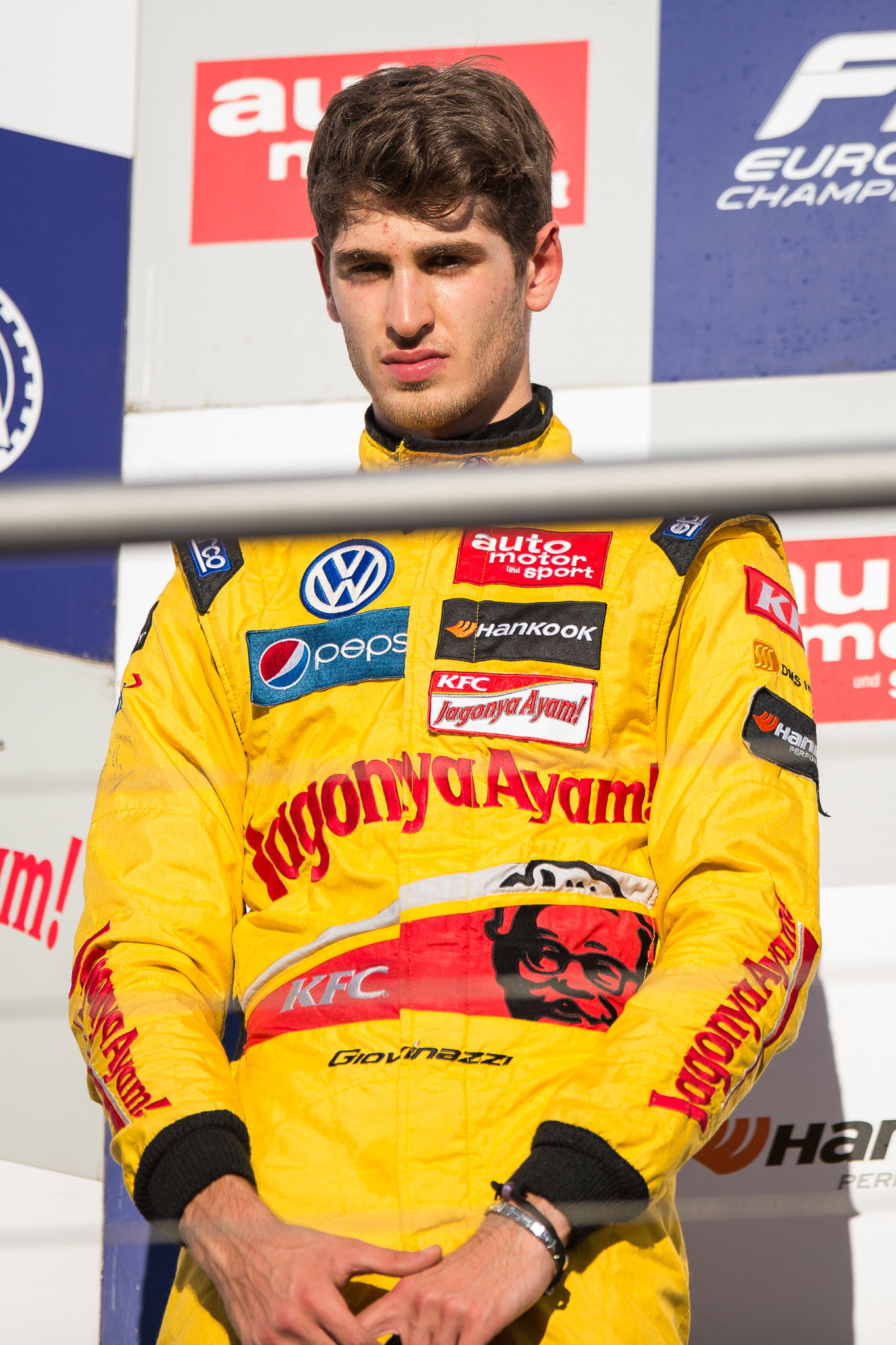
Antonio Giovinazzi (pictured in 2014) won the first pole position of his GP2 Series career and later won both races.

One 45-minute practice session on Friday was held before the two races. The session was held on a dirty track with lap times gradually improving throughout practice when the cars cleaned the circuit. Nato set the fastest lap with a time of 1:55.392, ahead of Giovinazzi in second and Sergey Sirotkin in third. Gasly, Oliver Rowland, Luca Ghiotto (Trident), Jordan King, Arthur Pic (Rapax), Marciello, and Sergio Canamasas (Carlin) rounded out the session's top-ten drivers. The session was disrupted when King went onto the turn 15 run-off area and was required to swerve to avoid hitting a van parked at the corner, prompting the activation of the virtual safety car (VSC) to allow the vehicle to be moved. Two further VSC periods were necessitated late on when Marciello and Gustav Malja (Rapax) slid off the track at the same corner, ending their sessions prematurely.

Friday afternoon's qualifying session ran for 30-minutes. The session determined the starting order for the first race with the drivers' fastest lap times. The pole position winner was awarded four points for the Drivers' and Teams' Championships. No competitor was required to start the races with the tyres they qualified on. Qualifying was postponed until after the second Formula One practice session when race director Charlie Whiting inspected the track at the second and third turns and decided that alterations were required to the kerbs in the area. It came after concerns were raised by Pirelli who reported that several tyres had been cut five cm (50 mm) by several loosened screws. The session was held in cloudy and windy weather conditions. Giovinazzi achieved the first pole position of his GP2 Series career, and the second for Prema Racing, with a time of 1:51.752. He was joined on the grid's front row by ART Grand Prix's Nobuharu Matsushita who had pole position until Giovinazzi's lap. His teammate Sirotkin qualified third and was fastest early on. Marciello took fourth, and Ghiotto was fifth, which was achieved on his second run. Rowland, Marvin Kirchhöfer, Gasly, Nato, and Canamasas rounded out the top ten qualifiers. King was the fastest driver not to qualify in the top ten with the field was completed by Markelov, DAMS teammates Lynn and Nicholas Latifi. Mitch Evans (Campos Racing), Pic, Daniël de Jong (MP Motorsport), Jimmy Eriksson (Arden International), Malja, Sean Gelael (Campos Racing), Nabil Jeffri (Arden International) and Philo Paz Armand (Trident). The session was stopped when Armand and de Jong drove onto the turn three escape road; de Jong was unable to continue.

=== Qualifying classification ===
Final qualifying classification
Pos.	No.	Driver	Team	Time	Gap	Grid
1	20	(Italy) Antonio Giovinazzi	Prema Racing	1:51.752	—	1
2	1	(Japan) Nobuharu Matsushita	ART Grand Prix	1:51.841	+0.089	2
3	2	(Russia) Sergey Sirotkin	ART Grand Prix	1:52.532	+0.780	3
4	9	(Italy) Raffaele Marciello	Russian Time	1:52.555	+0.803	4
5	15	(Italy) Luca Ghiotto	Trident	1:52.691	+0.939	5
6	22	(United Kingdom) Oliver Rowland	MP Motorsport	1:52.739	+0.987	6
7	19	(Germany) Marvin Kirchhöfer	Carlin	1:52.756	+1.004	7
8	21	(France) Pierre Gasly	Prema Racing	1:52.760	+1.008	8
9	3	(France) Norman Nato	Racing Engineering	1:52.929	+1.177	9
10	18	(Spain) Sergio Canamasas	Carlin	1:52.962	+1.210	10
11	4	(United Kingdom) Jordan King	Racing Engineering	1:52.962	+1.210	11
12	10	(Russia) Artem Markelov	Russian Time	1:53.040	+1.288	12
13	5	(United Kingdom) Alex Lynn	DAMS	1:53.092	+1.340	13
14	6	(Canada) Nicholas Latifi	DAMS	1:53.226	+1.474	14
15	7	(New Zealand) Mitch Evans	Campos Racing	1:53.401	+1.649	15
16	12	(France) Arthur Pic	Rapax	1:53.702	+1.950	16
17	23	(Netherlands) Daniël de Jong	MP Motorsport	1:54.000	+2.248	17
18	25	(Sweden) Jimmy Eriksson	Arden International	1:54.034	+2.282	18
19	11	(Sweden) Gustav Malja	Rapax	1:54.213	+2.461	19
20	8	(Indonesia) Sean Gelael	Campos Racing	1:54.717	+2.965	20
21	24	(Malaysia) Nabil Jeffri	Arden International	1:55.333	+3.581	21
22	14	(Indonesia) Philo Paz Armand	Trident	1:57.692	+5.940	22

== Races ==
The first race was held over 170 km (110 mi) or 60 minutes (which ever came first) and the regulations required drivers to make one pit stop. The first ten finishers scored points, with two given to the fastest lap holder. The grid for the second race was determined by the finishing order of the first but with the first eight drivers in reverse order of where they finished. It was run for 120 km (75 mi) or 45 minutes (which ever came first) and, in contrast to the first race, drivers were not required to make pit stops. The top eight finishers earned points towards their respective championships.

=== Feature Race ===
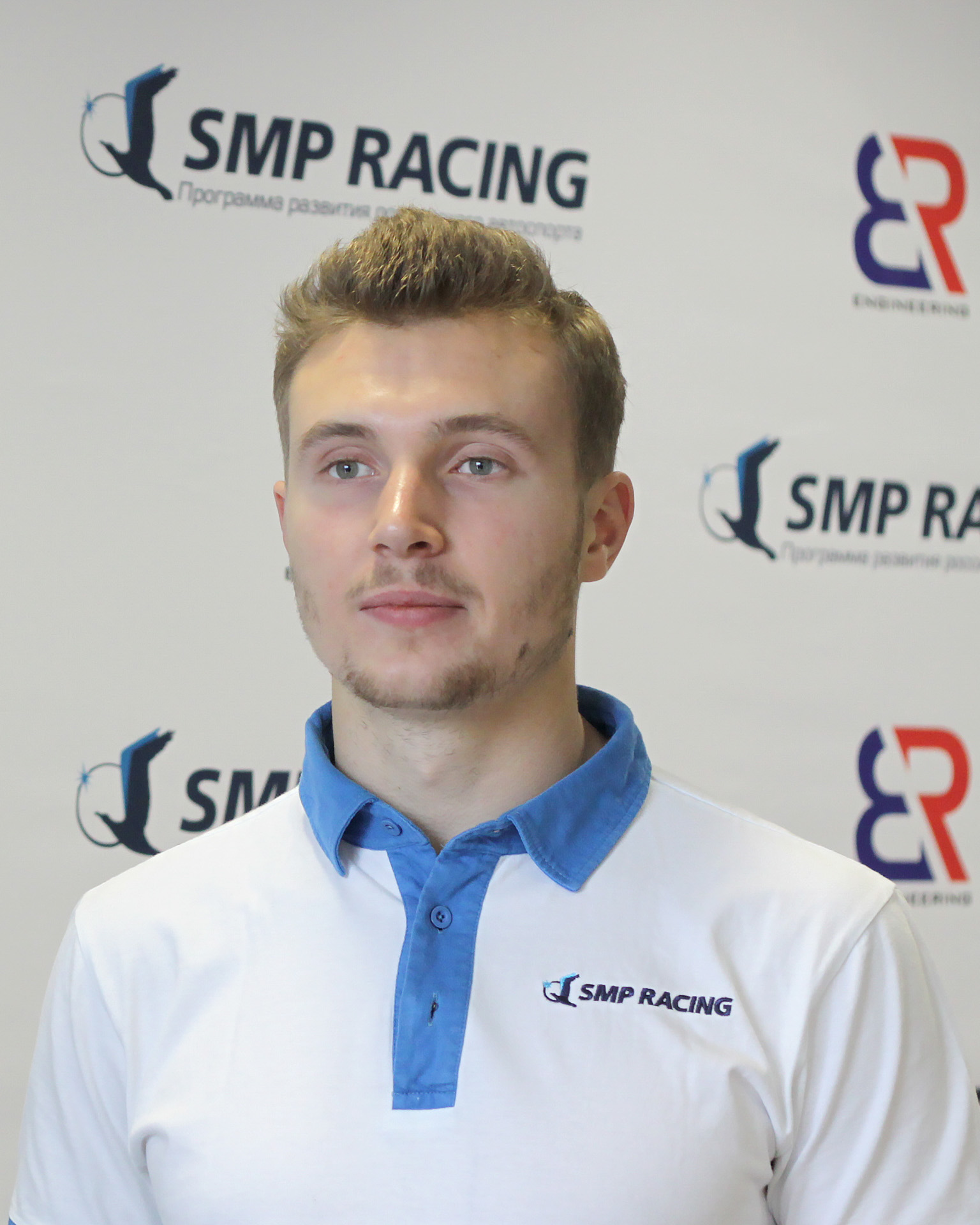
Sergey Sirotkin (pictured in 2017) finished second after passing Oliver Rowland for the position on the final lap of the first race.

The first race began at 12:00 Azerbaijan Time (UTC+4) on 18 June. The weather at the start were hot with an air temperature of 29 °C (84 °F) and a track temperature of 46 °C (115 °F). At the outset, Giovinazzi made a slow start and fell to fifth. Matsushita took the lead and maintained the position into the first corner. Sirotkin fell from third to seventh. A multi-car collision occurred at the first turn when Gasly attempted to overtake Nato on the outside. But, as the amount of room alongside the inside barrier was reduced, the two drivers made contact. Nato was sent into a spin, and as Gasly drove slowly away from the corner, Canamasas went into the rear of his car. Kirchhöfer drove into Lynn and Latifi was caught up in the incident. With the exception of Nato, all drivers retired from the race because of the damage sustained to their cars. Sirotkin battled a Racing Engineering car in turn five but made contact with him, damaging the front wing's left endplate. To allow the stricken cars to be removed from the turn one run-off area, the incident prompted the deployment of the safety car, which entered pit lane at the start of the third lap to allow racing to continue. Marciello passed Matsushita for first at the first corner by slipstreaming him, although the latter reclaimed the position with a pass on Marciello on the start/finish straight by drafting behind him.

King was overtaken by Markelov on the same lap. Marciello passed Matsushita at turn three to retake the lead on lap six. Armand crashed into the turn one barrier on the same lap, resulting in the safety car's second appearance. Most drivers elected to make their mandatory pit stops during the safety car period. Marciello remained ahead of Matsushita and maintained the lead when the safety car entered the pit lane soon after. Marciello held off Matsushita to retain the lead while Pic squeezed Markelov towards the turn five barrier on the ninth lap and both drivers damaged their cars, causing Markelov to retire. Pic drove on for a short distance before retiring because of the damage resulting from the collision. The safety car was sent onto the track for the third time. Marciello maintained his lead at the restart, while Matsushita ran wide at the first turn, allowing Jeffri past for second place. Matsushita dropped to fifth position. Rowland passed both drivers on the inside as Marciello pulled away from the rest of the field. Having run in clean air, Giovinazzi had moved to third by the 12th lap, and then overtook Rowland on the start/finish straight with DRS for second two laps later.

Giovinazzi quickly caught Marciello and overtook him with DRS and drafting at the start of lap 18 for the lead. Giovinazzi began to pull away from Maricello. The safety car was deployed for the fourth (and final) time after Nato attempted to pass teammate King on the inside and retired after the latter put him inro the turn three barrier. The area was cleared of Nato's damaged car over the next five laps which finished the race under a time limit. Giovinazzi accelerated as late as possible to limit the slipstream effect and remained the leader at the lap-25 restart despite locking his tyres into the first turn. King retired from the race following contact with Eriksson. Giovinazzi remained the leader for the final two laps to take his and his team's first victory in the GP2 Series. Siroktin overtook Rowland for third and took second position from Marciello by drafting him on the start/finish straight. Rowland finished in fourth place, ahead of Evans and Matsushita whom he defended from in the final two laps. Gelael, de Jong, Ghiotto, and Malja rounded out the point-scoring positions. Eriksson and King were the final classified finishers. The attrition race was high, with ten drivers finishing the race.

==== Feature Race classification ====
Drivers who scored championship points are denoted in bold.

Final feature race classification
Pos.	No.	Driver	Team	Laps	Time/Retired	Grid	Points
1	20	(Italy) **Antonio Giovinazzi**	**Prema Racing**	26	1:03:05.420	1	25 (4)
2	2	(Russia) **Sergey Sirotkin**	**ART Grand Prix**	26	+1.233	3	18
3	9	(Italy) **Raffaele Marciello**	**Russian Time**	26	+1.343	4	15
4	22	(United Kingdom) **Oliver Rowland**	**MP Motorsport**	26	+2.141	6	12
5	7	(New Zealand) **Mitch Evans**	**Campos Racing**	26	+2.648	15	10
6	1	(Japan) **Nobuharu Matsushita**	**ART Grand Prix**	26	+3.110	2	8 (2)
7	8	(Indonesia) **Sean Gelael**	**Campos Racing**	26	+5.808	20	6
8	23	(Netherlands) **Daniël de Jong**	**MP Motorsport**	26	+6.663	17	4
9	15	(Italy) **Luca Ghiotto**	**Trident**	26	+7.058	5	2
10	11	(Sweden) **Gustav Malja**	**Rapax**	26	+7.595	19	1
Ret	25	(Sweden) Jimmy Eriksson	Arden International	24	Collision	18	
Ret	4	(United Kingdom) Jordan King	Racing Engineering	24	Collision	11	
Ret	3	(France) Norman Nato	Racing Engineering	18	Collision damage	9	
Ret	24	(Malaysia) Nabil Jeffri	Arden International	14	Spun off	21	
Ret	12	(France) Arthur Pic	Rapax	7	Collision damage	16	
Ret	10	(Russia) Artem Markelov	Russian Time	7	Collision damage	12	
Ret	14	(Indonesia) Philo Paz Armand	Trident	5	Accident	22	
Ret	18	(Spain) Sergio Canamasas	Carlin	0	Collision	10	
Ret	21	(France) Pierre Gasly	Prema Racing	0	Collision	8	
Ret	6	(Canada) Nicholas Latifi	DAMS	0	Collision	14	
Ret	19	(Germany) Marvin Kirchhöfer	Carlin	0	Collision	7	
Ret	5	(United Kingdom) Alex Lynn	DAMS	0	Collision	13	
Fastest lap: (Japan) Nobuharu Matsushita (ART Grand Prix) – 1:56.086 (on lap 18)

=== Sprint Race ===
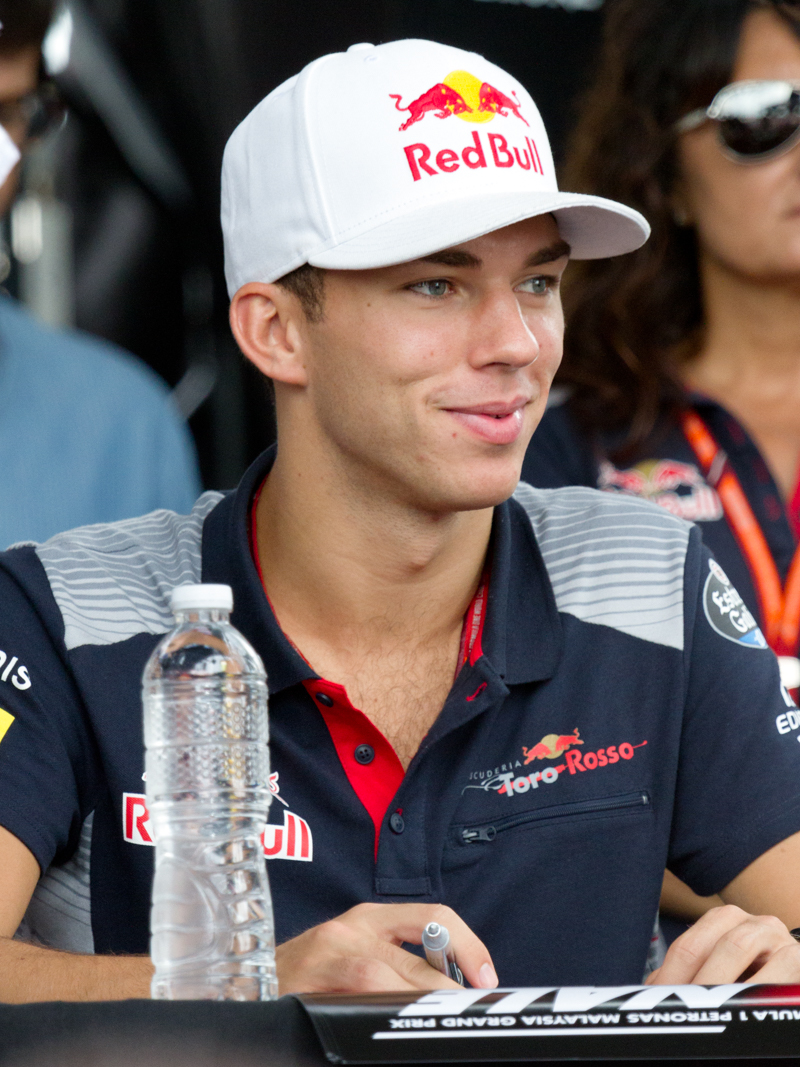
Pierre Gasly (pictured in 2017) was overtaken by Giovinazzi on the final lap of the second race.

The second event started at 14:00 local time on 19 June. The weather at the start were hot with an air temperature of 32 °C (90 °F) and a track temperature of 50 °C (122 °F). De Jong started from pole position but had a slow start and was overtaken by Matsushita (who began in third) on the inside into the first corner. This was also due to second-place starter Gelael making a slow start off his grid position. Giovinazzi dropped to the back of the field at the start due to an engine problem. Matsushita quickly pulled away from the rest of the field. Rowland attempted to pass Evans but ran deep into turn one but got past with DRS into the third corner. Evans lost a further position to Sirotkin on the following lap. Matsushita's lead was reduced to nothing when the safety car was deployed on lap eight. Eriksson was sent into a spin towards the turn one barrier after contact with King while battling for ninth place. The race was restarted after Eriksson's car was removed from the track by marshals. Matsushita accelerated early on the main straight and avoided hitting the safety car by reducing his speed. This enabled Rowland and de Jong to slipstream Matsushita; de Jong moved into the first position, but he and Rowland locked their tyres heavily into the first corner.

Rowland ran wide while de Jong reversed onto a run-off area. This was caused by both drivers not gaining optimum brake temperature. De Jong dropped to fifth while Rowland fell to third after the latter was passed by Sirotkin. Armand spun in the seventh corner, triggering the safety car's second appearance to allow Armand's car to be extricated from the turn's run off-area. It remained on the track for the next three laps. On the restart, Matsushita used a tactic of backing the field up before driving away. However some drivers accelerated away after passing the safety car line, while others remained Matsushita's dictated pace. This resulted in Malja colliding against the rear of Evans's car, removing his front wing, and sending debris airborne. Malja then hit Rowland in the first corner; although he spun he continued. Gelael was forced to collide with a barrier, causing him to retire. The incident resulted in the safety car's third deployment which stayed on track for the next two laps. At the lap 13 restart, Marciello got away faster than Matsushita and drove on the inside but locked his tyres while braking later than him. The two made contact steering into turn one, promoting Gasly to the lead, with teammate Giovinazzi second.

The two drivers pulled away from the rest of the field. Giovinazzi was unable to use his DRS because of a malfunction. He made attempts to overtake Gasly in the closing stages, driving on the outside on the start/finish straight and moving to the inside into turn one during the last lap. Gasly ran wide by missing his braking point while defending, allowing Giovinazzi to take the lead. He maintained the position for the remainder of the race to clinch his second consecutive victory. Gasly finished second, with Sirotkin in third. King took fourth, ahead of Markelov in fifth. Canamasas, Jeffri, and Pic were in positions six through eight, Lynn, Kirchhöfer, Marciello, Ghiotto, Latifi, de Jong and Rowland were the final classified finishers. Giovinazzi's victories meant he became the first driver since Davide Valsecchi in the first 2012 Bahrain round to win both races in a GP2 Series race weekend, and the seventh driver in series history to achieve the feat. Prema Racing achieved their first series victories in the round.

==== Sprint Race classification ====
Drivers who scored championship points are denoted in bold.

Final sprint race classification
Pos.	No.	Driver	Team	Laps	Time/Retired	Grid	Points
1	20	(Italy) **Antonio Giovinazzi**	**Prema Racing**	21	44:49.606	8	15 (2)
2	21	(France) **Pierre Gasly**	**Prema Racing**	21	+1.763	18	12
3	2	(Russia) **Sergey Sirotkin**	**ART Grand Prix**	21	+4.179	7	10
4	4	(United Kingdom) **Jordan King**	**Racing Engineering**	21	+5.672	12	8
5	10	(Russia) **Artem Markelov**	**Russian Time**	21	+14.809	15	6
6	18	(Spain) **Sergio Canamasas**	**Carlin**	21	+16.151	17	4
7	24	(Malaysia) **Nabil Jeffri**	**Arden International**	21	+17.693	14	2
8	12	(France) **Arthur Pic**	**Rapax**	21	+18.240	20	1
9	5	(United Kingdom) Alex Lynn	DAMS	21	+19.856	22	
10	19	(Germany) Marvin Kirchhöfer	Carlin	21	+22.745	21	
11	9	(Italy) Raffaele Marciello	Russian Time	21	+23.645	6	
12	15	(Italy) Luca Ghiotto	Trident	21	+26.490	9	
13	6	(Canada) Nicholas Latifi	DAMS	21	+28.862	19	
14	23	(Netherlands) Daniël de Jong	MP Motorsport	21	+52.851	1	
15	22	(United Kingdom) Oliver Rowland	MP Motorsport	20	+1 Lap	5	
Ret	1	(Japan) Nobuharu Matsushita	ART Grand Prix	13	Collision	3	
Ret	7	(New Zealand) Mitch Evans	Campos Racing	12	Collision damage	4	
Ret	8	(Indonesia) Sean Gelael	Campos Racing	11	Collision	2	
Ret	11	(Sweden) Gustav Malja	Rapax	11	Collision	10	
Ret	14	(Indonesia) Philo Paz Armand	Trident	9	Accident	16	
Ret	3	(France) Norman Nato	Racing Engineering	9	Accident	13	
Ret	25	(Sweden) Jimmy Eriksson	Arden International	7	Accident	11	
Fastest lap: (Italy) Antonio Giovinazzi (Prema Racing) – 1:54.792 (on lap 16)

== Post-round ==
The top three drivers of both races appeared on the podium to collect their trophies and spoke to the media at a later press conference. After the first race, Giovinazzi said he had been amazed at his first GP2 Series victory and thanked his team and his primary sponsor. He stated that he did not believe he would able to secure his first victory before the season was over, and was happy to score the points for himself and his team. Sirotkin said the race was not easy for him because he did not have the start he wanted. He said that he was happy to finish second but would not to be content coming second or third in every event. Marciello commented he expected some safety cars to affect the race but was unhappy with how many there were as they had prevented him building a large enough gap to others. He said that his third-place finish was good for his team and that he was unsurprised when Sirotkin passed him on the start/finish straight on the first race's final lap as he saw him close up behind the safety car.

Following the second race, Giovinazzi thanked his team for encouraging him not to give up and that he felt emotional and excited during the event's final lap. He stated that he was expecting a good result but had not anticipated winning both of the weekend's races. Giovinazzi said it would be difficult to repeat the performance but he would enjoy the results. Gasly said it felt like "a crazy race" but enjoyed it. He stated that he attempted to focus on driving to be as fast as possible, but it had been difficult to build a large gap because of the circuit's long straights. He was happy with to place second and said that it had been a fair battle for the win. Matsushita was issued with a one-race ban for the next race weekend in Austria for "erratic driving" and for causing a safety hazard in the first and second rolling restarts of the sprint race. Eriksson was deemed to have caused the collision with King and incurred with a three-place grid penalty for the season's next race.

The result of the races moved Markelov to the lead of the Drivers' Championship with 54 points, ahead of Nato who dropped to second. Giovinazzi's two victories moved him to third place. Gasly remained in fourth place on 45 points, two points ahead of Marciello in fifth. Russian Time remained in the lead of the Teams' Championship with 97 points, eight points in front of second-placed Prema. Racing Engineering dropped to third position on 73 position, while DAMS moved from third to fourth. ART Grand Prix were fifth on 60 points, with seven rounds left in the season.

== Standings after the round ==
Drivers' Championship standings

+/–	Pos	Driver	Points
1	1	(Russia) Artem Markelov	54
1	2	(France) Norman Nato	49
15	3	(Italy) Antonio Giovinazzi	46
	4	(France) Pierre Gasly	45
	5	(Italy) Raffaele Marciello	43

Teams' Championship standings

+/–	Pos	Team	Points
	1	(Russia) Russian Time	97
2	2	(Italy) Prema Racing	89
1	3	(Spain) Racing Engineering	73
1	4	(France) DAMS	61
2	5	(France) ART Grand Prix	60

- Note: Only the top five positions are included for both sets of standings.

Previous round: 2016 Monaco GP2 Series round	GP2 Series; 2016 season	Next round: 2016 Red Bull Ring GP2 Series round
Previous round: None	Baku GP2 round	Next round: 2017 Baku Formula 2 round
