= Baku City Circuit =

Motor racing circuit in Baku, Azerbaijan

- Grand Prix Circuit (2016–present)
- Location: Azadliq Square, Baku, Azerbaijan
- Coordinates: 40°22′21″N 49°51′12″E
- Capacity: 18,500
- FIA Grade: 1
- Opened: 17 June 2016; 10 years ago
- Architect: Hermann Tilke
- Major events: Current: Formula One; Azerbaijan Grand Prix (2017–2019, 2021–present); European Grand Prix (2016); Formula 2 Baku Formula 2 round (2017–2019, 2021–present)
- Website: https://www.bakucitycircuit.com

Grand Prix Circuit (2016–present)
- Length: 6.003 km (3.730 mi)
- Turns: 20
- Race lap record: 1:43.009 ( (Monaco) Charles Leclerc, Ferrari SF90, 2019, F1)

The Baku City Circuit (Azerbaijani: Bakı Şəhər Halqası) is a motor racing street circuit located in Baku, Azerbaijan, constructed near Baku Boulevard. A lap of the circuit is 6.003 km (3.730 mi), making it the fourth-longest circuit on the Formula One calendar (after Circuit de Spa-Francorchamps, Jeddah Street Circuit and Las Vegas Strip Circuit). The inaugural Formula One race at the circuit was the 2016 European Grand Prix and its support events. A year later, in 2017, the circuit held the inaugural Azerbaijan Grand Prix. The event is organised by Baku City Circuit Operation Company (Azerbaijani: Bakı Şəhər Halqası Əməliyyat Şirkəti).

== History ==
=== Development ===
In December 2013, Formula One President and CEO Bernie Ecclestone suggested that the race would be run in 2016 but later said that because the Korean Grand Prix organisers were in breach of contract, it would be moved to 2015. However, in July 2014 it was announced that the race's debut would be delayed until 2016.

=== Design ===
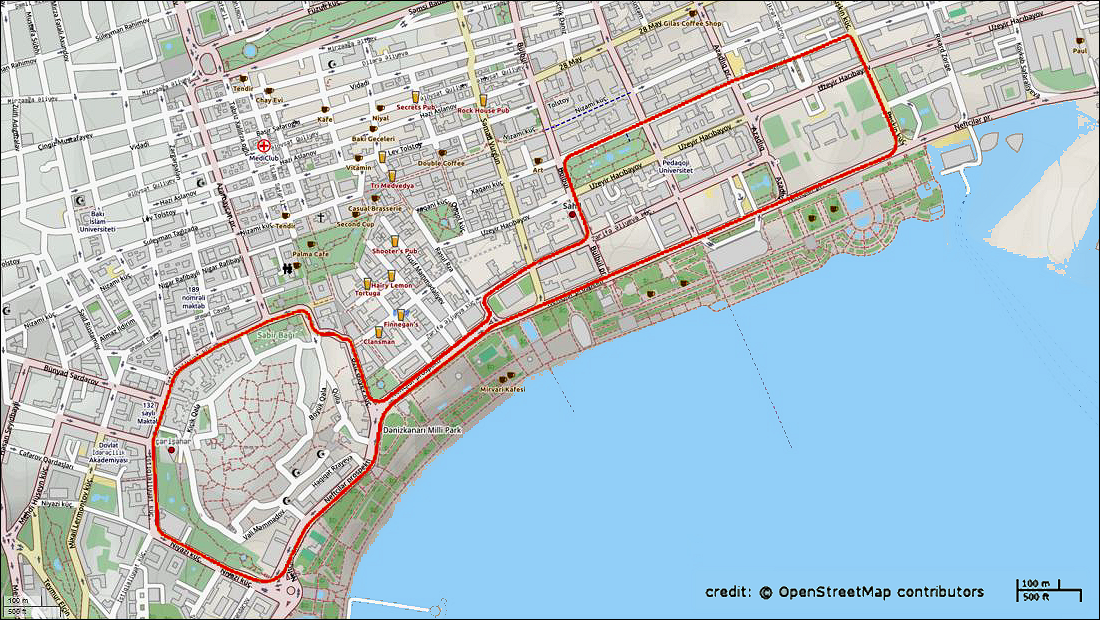
The layout of the 6 km (3.7 mi) circuit in the city of Baku

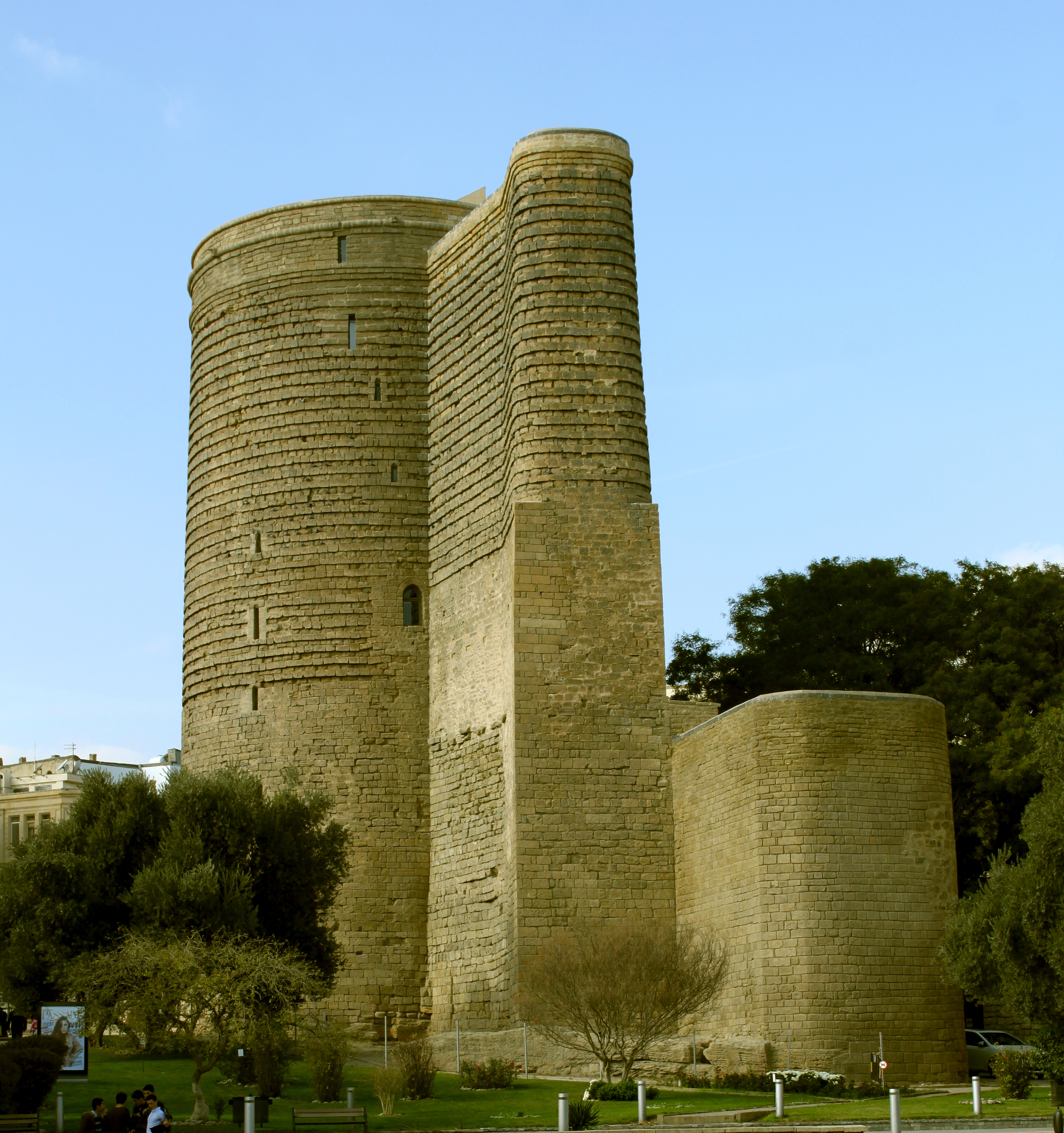
The Maiden Tower, near turn 18

The 6.003 km (3.730 mi), anti-clockwise layout of the circuit was designed by circuit architect Hermann Tilke. The circuit starts adjacent to Azadliq Square, then loops around Government House before heading west along a 1 km (0.62 mi) straight to the Palace of the Shirvanshahs and Maiden Tower. Here, the track has a narrow 7.6 m (25 ft) uphill section and then runs around the Old City before opening up onto a 2.2 km (1.4 mi) stretch along Neftchilar Avenue back to the start line. The circuit was projected to be the fastest street circuit in the world, with a top speed close to 360 km/h (220 mph) and the second-longest circuit on the current F1 calendar, behind the Circuit de Spa-Francorchamps in Belgium. The circuit's tight layout through urban parkland shares similarities with the Montjuïc circuit which hosted the Spanish Grand Prix in the 1970s.

The 2016 GP2 race, which was in support of the 2016 European Grand Prix, saw 12 out of 22 drivers fail to finish. Valtteri Bottas set a new unofficial Formula One top speed record in qualifying for the 2016 European Grand Prix when Williams claimed to have data showing him reaching 378 km/h (235 mph), eclipsing the previous record of 372 km/h (231 mph) set in 2005 by Juan Pablo Montoya for McLaren while testing at Autodromo Nazionale di Monza.

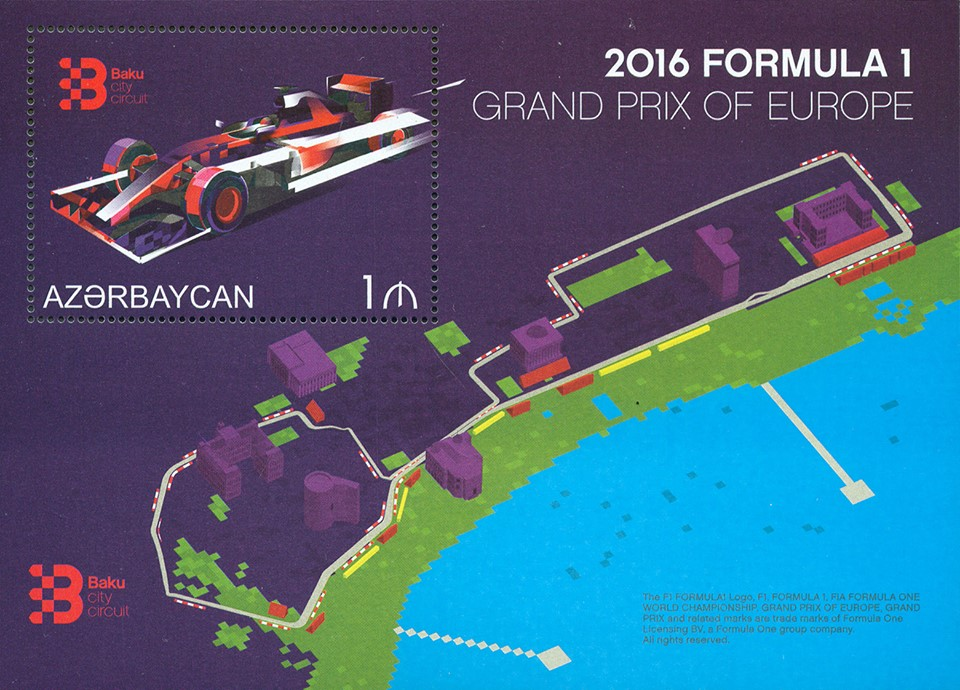
F1-themed stamp of Azerbaijan, 2016

Pirelli found that 90% of the rear tyres used during free practice for the 2016 Grand Prix had been cut by bolts securing kerbs that had not been drilled in deeply enough, while Jenson Button and Nico Rosberg expressed concern over the lack of run-off areas which would be dangerous in the case of an incident such as a high speed puncture or mechanical failure. Valtteri Bottas was forced to miss the whole of Free Practice 3 when a drain cover came loose and caused significant damage to his Williams FW38. Similarly, the first practice session of the 2019 Azerbaijan Grand Prix was cancelled when George Russell hit a loose drain cover. Many drivers praised the circuit for the challenge offered by its mixture of long straights, slow technical sections and no margin for error due to the proximity of the walls. In 2021, Rosberg criticised the location of the pit lane entrance adjacent to the 350 km/h (220 mph) main straight, calling it "one of the places I always found the most dangerous of the whole year". Formula One race director Michael Masi disagreed with Rosberg, saying the venue "fulfills all of the various safety requirements that the FIA has within its regulation requirements".

In October 2022, Arif Rahimov was dismissed from the post of Executive Director of Baku City Circuit, after he had held this position for the past 7 years. Magsud Farzullayev was appointed acting executive director.

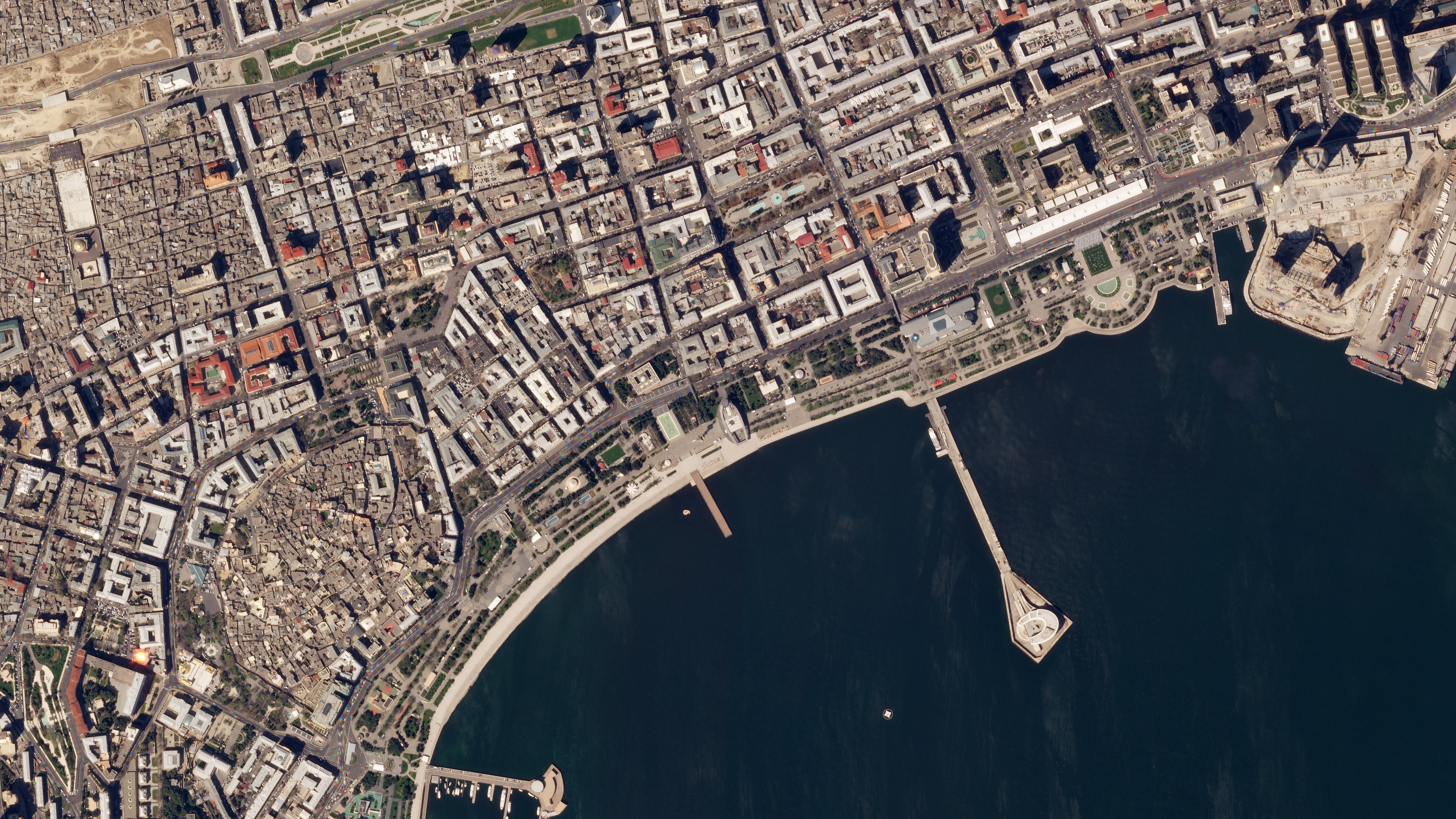
The Baku City Circuit in 2018

== Events ==
Current

- September: Formula One Azerbaijan Grand Prix, FIA Formula 2 Championship Baku Formula 2 round

Former

- Formula One
  - European Grand Prix (2016)
- GP2 Series (2016)

== Lap records ==
As of April 2023, the fastest official race lap records at the Baku City Circuit are listed as:

Category	Time	Driver	Vehicle	Event
Grand Prix Circuit (2016–present): 6.003 km (3.730 mi)
Formula One	1:43.009	(Monaco) Charles Leclerc	Ferrari SF90	2019 Azerbaijan Grand Prix
FIA F2	1:53.478	(France) Isack Hadjar	Dallara F2 2018	2023 Baku Formula 2 round
GP2	1:54.792	(Italy) Antonio Giovinazzi	Dallara GP2/11	2016 Baku GP2 Series round

== See also ==
- European Grand Prix
- Azerbaijan Grand Prix
