= List of FIA Formula 2 Championship drivers =

This is a List of FIA Formula 2 Championship drivers, that is, a list of drivers who have made at least one race start in the FIA Formula 2 Championship, which was established in 2017.

This list is accurate up to the Baku round of the 2026 FIA Formula 2 Championship.

== By name ==
Key
Symbol	Meaning
*	Driver has competed in the most recent round.
^{F1}	Driver has competed in Formula One
†	Driver has won the FIA Formula 2 championship

Drivers in bold currently compete in the 2026 FIA Formula 2 Championship.

This table is accurate as of the 2026 Baku Formula 2 round.

Name	License	Seasons	Best pos.	Entries	Starts	Poles (Note: Feature race pole positions only.)	Wins			Podiums	F. laps (Note: In Formula 2, the point for fastest lap is given to the driver who set the fastest lap within the top ten classified positions. These figures account for fastest laps regardless of where the driver finished.)	Points
Name	License	Seasons	Best pos.	Entries	Starts	Poles	Sprint	Feature	Total	Podiums	F. laps	Points
Jack Aitken^{F1}	United Kingdom	2018–2021	5th	79	76	0	3	1	4	11	3	270
Alex Albon^{F1}	Thailand	2017–2018	**3rd**	44	44	3	1	3	4	10	1	298
Giuliano Alesi	France	2019–2020	15th	48	46	0	0	0	0	0	1	32
Kimi Antonelli^{F1}	Italy	2024	6th	28	26	0	1	1	2	3	4	113
Marcus Armstrong	New Zealand	2020–2022	13th	76	75	0	4	0	4	8	0	194
Paul Aron	Estonia	2023–2024	**3rd**	30	30	4	0	1	1	8	2	163
Taylor Barnard	United Kingdom	2024	21st	20	20	0	1	0	1	1	0	18
Oliver Bearman^{F1}	United Kingdom	2023–2024	6th	52	50	3	4	3	7	9	3	205
David Beckmann	Germany	2021–2022	15th	32	31	0	0	0	0	2	1	57
**Dino Beganovic***	Sweden	2024–2026	7th	55	54	3	2	1	3	11	6	259
Brad Benavides	United States	2023	22nd	18	18	0	0	0	0	0	0	0
**John Bennett***	United Kingdom	2024–2026	22nd	55	54	0	1	0	1	2	1	42
**Roman Bilinski***	Poland	2026	–	25	24	0	0	0	0	1	1	36
René Binder	Austria	2017 (Note: Binder raced in the predecessor GP2 Series from 2012 to 2016.)	28th	2	2	0	0	0	0	0	1	0
Dorian Boccolacci	France	2018–2019	14th	20	20	0	0	0	0	0	0	33
Cem Bölükbaşı	Turkey	2022	24th	18	16	0	0	0	0	0	0	0
Gabriel Bortoleto^{F1}†	Brazil	2024	**1st**	28	28	2	0	2	2	8	2	214.5
Ralph Boschung	Switzerland	2017–2023	10th	130	120	0	1	0	1	6	4	167.5
**Mari Boya***	Spain	2026	–	25	25	0	0	0	0	0	0	21
Luke Browning	United Kingdom	2024–2025	4th	34	33	1	0	1	1	9	3	169
Tatiana Calderón	Colombia	2019, 2022	22nd	32	29	0	0	0	0	0	0	0
Olli Caldwell	United Kingdom	2021–2022	21st	32	32	0	0	0	0	0	1	12
**Rafael Câmara***	Brazil	2026	–	25	25	5	0	3	3	7	5	207
Sergio Canamasas	Spain	2017 (Note: Canamasas raced in the predecessor GP2 Series from 2012 to 2016.)	14th	14	14	0	0	0	0	0	0	21
Johnny Cecotto Jr.	Venezuela	2017 (Note: Cecotto raced in the predecessor GP2 Series from 2009 to 2016.)	16th	8	8	0	0	0	0	1	0	16
Franco Colapinto ^{F1}	Argentina	2023–2024	9th	22	22	0	1	0	1	3	3	96
Stefano Coletti	Monaco	2017 (Note: Coletti raced in the predecessor GP2 Series in 2009 and from 2011 to 2014.)	27th	2	2	0	0	0	0	0	1	0
Amaury Cordeel	Belgium	2022–2025	17th	104	101	0	0	0	0	0	1	76
Juan Manuel Correa	United States	2019, 2022–2024	13th	70	68	0	0	0	0	3	0	80
Jak Crawford	United States	2023–2025	**2nd**	82	80	3	2	4	6	19	2	357
Jehan Daruvala	India	2020–2023	7th	100	98	0	3	1	4	18	4	370
Nyck de Vries^{F1}†	Netherlands	2017–2019	**1st**	70	67	7	3	5	8	23	7	582
Alessio Deledda	Italy	2021	25th	24	23	0	0	0	0	0	0	0
Louis Delétraz	Switzerland	2017–2020 (Note: Delétraz raced in the predecessor GP2 Series in 2016.)	8th	94	92	0	0	0	0	10	2	316
Jack Doohan^{F1}	Australia	2021–2023	**3rd**	60	59	5	2	4	6	11	7	303
Felipe Drugovich†	Brazil	2020–2022	**1st**	76	73	5	3	5	8	19	5	491
**Joshua Dürksen***	Paraguay	2024–2026	9th	81	80	0	5	3	8	16	2	284
**Alex Dunne***	Ireland	2025–2026	5th	53	52	3	0	3	3	16	5	339
Max Esterson	United States	2024–2025	23rd	26	25	0	0	0	0	0	0	0
Santino Ferrucci	United States	2017–2018	19th	24	23	0	0	0	0	0	0	11
**Emerson Fittipaldi Jr.***	Brazil	2026	–	25	25	0	0	0	0	1	0	28
Enzo Fittipaldi	Brazil	2021–2024	7th	87	85	0	1	1	2	13	3	313
Leonardo Fornaroli†	Italy	2024–2025	**1st**	30	29	3	3	1	4	9	0	211
Nirei Fukuzumi	Japan	2018	17th	24	23	0	0	0	0	0	0	17
Antonio Fuoco	Italy	2017–2018	7th	46	45	0	2	1	3	11	2	239
Sean Gelael	Indonesia	2017–2020 (Note: Gelael raced in the predecessor GP2 Series from 2015 to 2016.)	15th	86	79	0	0	0	0	1	1	64
Luca Ghiotto	Italy	2017–2020, 2022 (Note: Ghiotto raced in the predecessor GP2 Series in 2016.)	**3rd**	96	93	2	5	1	6	24	5	609
**Oliver Goethe***	Germany	2024–2026	15th	61	60	0	0	0	0	2	3	88
Maximilian Günther	Germany	2018	14th	22	22	0	1	0	1	2	1	41
Isack Hadjar^{F1}	France	2023–2024	**2nd**	54	54	1	1	4	5	10	2	247
Dennis Hauger	Norway	2022–2024	8th	78	78	2	4	1	5	13	6	313.5
**Colton Herta***	United States	2026	–	25	23	0	0	0	0	0	0	26
Anthoine Hubert	France	2019	10th	18	16	0	2	0	2	2	0	77
Jake Hughes	United Kingdom	2020−2022	16th	27	26	0	0	0	0	0	0	34
Callum Ilott	United Kingdom	2017, 2019–2020	**2nd**	50	47	6	1	2	3	8	0	275
**Tasanapol Inthraphuvasak***	Thailand	2025–2026	26th	27	25	0	0	0	0	1	0	71
Matevos Isaakyan	Russia	2019	25th	4	4	0	0	0	0	0	0	0
Ayumu Iwasa	Japan	2022–2023	4th	54	54	3	2	3	5	12	4	306
Nabil Jeffri	Malaysia	2017 (Note: Jeffri raced in the predecessor GP2 Series in 2016.)	23rd	22	22	0	0	0	0	0	0	2
Niko Kari	Finland	2018	24th	4	4	0	0	0	0	0	0	0
Jordan King	United Kingdom	2017, 2019 (Note: King raced in the predecessor GP2 Series from 2015 to 2016.)	9th	44	42	0	0	0	0	2	5	141
Niels Koolen	Netherlands	2024	32nd	4	4	0	0	0	0	0	0	0
Nicholas Latifi^{F1}	Canada	2017–2019 (Note: Latifi raced in the predecessor GP2 Series from 2014 to 2016.)	**2nd**	70	67	0	3	3	6	20	8	483
Liam Lawson^{F1}	New Zealand	2021–2022	**3rd**	52	51	1	5	0	5	13	5	252
Arthur Leclerc	Monaco	2023	15th	26	26	0	0	0	0	1	1	49
Charles Leclerc^{F1}†	Monaco	2017	**1st**	22	22	8	2	5	7	10	4	282
**Noel León***	Mexico	2026	–	25	25	1	2	1	3	5	2	133
Arvid Lindblad^{F1}	United Kingdom	2025	6th	28	27	1	2	1	3	5	2	134
Alessio Lorandi	Italy	2018	20th	10	10	0	0	0	0	0	0	6
Christian Lundgaard	Denmark	2019–2021	7th	50	49	1	2	0	2	9	2	199
Arjun Maini	India	2018–2019	16th	30	29	0	0	0	0	0	0	24
**Kush Maini***	India	2023–2026	11th	107	106	3	3	0	3	10	4	258
Tadasuke Makino	Japan	2018	13th	24	24	0	0	1	1	1	0	48
Gustav Malja	Sweden	2017 (Note: Malja raced in the predecessor GP2 Series from 2015 to 2016.)	13th	22	22	0	0	0	0	1	0	44
Zane Maloney	Barbados	2022–2024	4th	54	54	1	1	1	2	11	1	236
Christian Mansell	Australia	2024	25th	6	6	0	0	0	0	0	0	10
Raffaele Marciello	Italy	2017 (Note: Marciello raced in the predecessor GP2 Series from 2014 to 2016.)	29th	2	2	0	0	0	0	0	0	0
Artem Markelov	Russia	2017–2020 (Note: Markelov raced in the predecessor GP2 Series from 2014 to 2016.)	**2nd**	76	75	1	4	4	8	14	6	417
Pepe Martí	Spain	2024–2025	8th	52	51	0	4	0	4	9	0	174
Victor Martins	France	2023–2025	5th	82	81	6	1	2	3	18	10	354
Joshua Mason	United Kingdom	2023	23rd	8	8	0	0	0	0	0	0	0
Nobuharu Matsushita	Japan	2017, 2019–2020 (Note: Matsushita raced in the predecessor GP2 Series from 2015 to 2016.)	6th	64	61	2	2	3	5	10	7	317
Nikita Mazepin^{F1}	Russia	2019–2020	5th	48	46	0	0	2	2	6	2	175
Sami Meguetounif	France	2025	21st	22	21	0	0	0	0	0	0	2
Roberto Merhi^{F1}	Spain	2017–2018, 2022	12th	34	33	0	0	0	0	3	0	92
**Gabriele Minì***	Italy	2024–2026	13th	55	54	0	1	1	2	13	3	241
**Ritomo Miyata***	Japan	2024–2026	17th	81	80	0	1	0	1	3	2	131
**Sebastián Montoya***	Colombia	2025–2026	12th	53	51	0	0	0	0	4	3	121
Matteo Nannini	Italy	2021	22nd	9	8	0	0	0	0	0	0	1
Norman Nato	France	2017 (Note: Nato raced in the predecessor GP2 Series from 2015 to 2016.)	9th	22	22	0	1	0	1	3	0	91
Roy Nissany	Israel	2018, 2020–2023	16th	120	119	0	0	0	0	1	3	42
Lando Norris^{F1}	United Kingdom	2017–2018	**2nd**	26	26	1	0	1	1	9	1	219
Clément Novalak	France	2021–2023	14th	58	58	0	0	1	1	2	3	68
Zak O'Sullivan	United Kingdom	2024	16th	22	22	0	1	1	2	2	1	59
Pato O'Ward	United States (Note: O'Ward is a Mexican driver who competed under an American racing license.)	2019	26th	2	2	0	0	0	0	0	0	0
Álex Palou	Japan (Note: Palou is a Spanish driver who competed under a Japanese racing license.)	2017	21st	4	4	0	0	0	0	0	0	5
Gianluca Petecof	Brazil	2021	27th	6	6	0	0	0	0	0	0	0
Oscar Piastri^{F1}†	Australia	2021	**1st**	24	23	5	2	4	6	11	6	252.5
Pedro Piquet	Brazil	2020	20th	24	24	0	0	0	0	0	0	3
Théo Pourchaire†	France	2020–2023	**1st**	82	81	3	1	5	6	20	6	507
Mahaveer Raghunathan	Netherlands (Note: Raghunathan is an Indian driver who competed under a Dutch racing license.)	2019	20th	22	20	0	0	0	0	0	0	1
Oliver Rowland	United Kingdom	2017 (Note: Rowland raced in the predecessor GP2 Series from 2015 to 2016.)	**3rd**	22	22	1	0	2	2	10	1	191
George Russell^{F1}†	United Kingdom	2018	**1st**	24	24	5	3	4	7	11	5	287
Guilherme Samaia	Brazil	2020–2021	24th	48	47	0	0	0	0	0	0	0
Logan Sargeant^{F1}	United States	2021–2022	4th	31	31	2	0	2	2	4	0	148
Marino Sato	Japan	2019–2022	21st	84	81	0	0	0	0	0	0	8
Mick Schumacher^{F1}†	Germany	2019–2020	**1st**	48	46	0	1	2	3	11	4	268
Sérgio Sette Câmara	Brazil	2017–2019	4th	70	66	3	2	1	3	18	6	415
Robert Shwartzman	Russia	2020–2021	**2nd**	48	47	0	4	2	6	14	4	369
Sergey Sirotkin^{F1}	Russia	2017 (Note: Sirotkin raced in the predecessor GP2 Series from 2015 to 2016.)	20th	2	2	0	0	0	0	0	0	9
**Cian Shields***	United Kingdom	2024–2026	24th	57	56	0	0	0	0	0	2	10
Roman Staněk	Czech Republic	2023–2025	10th	76	75	2	1	1	2	6	0	134
**Martinius Stenshorne***	Norway	2025–2026	20th	31	30	1	0	1	1	4	3	109
Dan Ticktum	United Kingdom	2018, 2020–2021	4th	50	49	0	3	0	3	11	2	256
**Nikola Tsolov***	Bulgaria	2025–2026	18th	29	29	0	2	4	6	10	2	212
Yuki Tsunoda^{F1}	Japan	2020	**3rd**	24	24	4	1	2	3	7	1	200
Ryan Tveter	United States	2019	27th	2	2	0	0	0	0	0	0	0
**Laurens van Hoepen***	Netherlands	2025–2026	25th	31	30	1	0	0	0	5	0	90
Nicolás Varrone	Argentina	2026	–	22	22	0	0	0	0	0	1	15
Richard Verschoor	Netherlands	2021–2025	**3rd**	131	129	2	4	4	8	20	10	543
Frederik Vesti	Denmark	2022–2023	**2nd**	54	53	2	5	2	7	15	2	309
**Rafael Villagómez***	Mexico	2024–2026	14th	81	80	0	0	0	0	5	0	98
Jüri Vips	Estonia	2020–2022	6th	60	59	2	2	1	3	12	5	250
Bent Viscaal	Netherlands	2021	14th	24	23	0	0	0	0	2	0	34
Robert Vișoiu	Romania	2017 (Note: Vișoiu raced in the predecessor GP2 Series in 2015.)	24th	14	14	0	0	0	0	0	0	1
James Wharton	Australia	2025	27th	2	2	0	0	0	0	0	0	0
Calan Williams	Australia	2022	23rd	26	26	0	0	0	0	0	0	5
**Hiyu Yamakoshi***	Japan	2026	–	3	3	0	0	0	0	0	0	2
Lirim Zendeli	Germany	2021–2022	17th	20	19	0	0	0	0	0	1	13
Zhou Guanyu^{F1}	China	2019–2021	**3rd**	72	68	3	3	2	5	20	7	474.5

== By racing license ==
License	Total drivers	Champions	Championships	Current	First driver(s)	Most recent driver(s)/ current driver(s)
Argentina	2	0	0	0	Franco Colapinto (2023 Yas Island Formula 2 round)	Nicolás Varrone (2026 Madrid Formula 2 round)
Australia	5	1 (Piastri)	1 (2021)	0	Oscar Piastri (2021 Sakhir Formula 2 round)	James Wharton (2025 Lusail Formula 2 round)
Austria	1	0	0	0	René Binder (2017 Jerez Formula 2 round)	René Binder (2017 Jerez Formula 2 round)
Barbados	1	0	0	0	Zane Maloney (2022 Yas Island Formula 2 round)	Zane Maloney (2024 Lusail Formula 2 round)
Belgium	1	0	0	0	Amaury Cordeel (2022 Sakhir Formula 2 round)	Amaury Cordeel (2025 Baku Formula 2 round)
Brazil	9	2 (Drugovich, Bortoleto)	2 (2022, 2024)	2	Sérgio Sette Câmara (2017 Sakhir Formula 2 round)	Rafael Câmara, Emerson Fittipaldi Jr. (2026 Baku Formula 2 round)
Bulgaria	1	0	0	1	Nikola Tsolov (2025 Lusail Formula 2 round)	Nikola Tsolov (2026 Baku Formula 2 round)
Canada	1	0	0	0	Nicholas Latifi (2017 Sakhir Formula 2 round)	Nicholas Latifi (2019 Yas Island Formula 2 round)
China	1	0	0	0	Guanyu Zhou (2019 Sakhir Formula 2 round)	Guanyu Zhou (2021 Yas Island Formula 2 round)
Colombia	2	0	0	1	Tatiana Calderón (2019 Sakhir Formula 2 round)	Sebastián Montoya (2026 Baku Formula 2 round)
Czech Republic	1	0	0	0	Roman Staněk (2023 Sakhir Formula 2 round)	Roman Staněk (2025 Yas Island Formula 2 round)
Denmark	2	0	0	0	Christian Lundgaard (2019 Yas Island Formula 2 round)	Frederik Vesti (2023 Yas Island Formula 2 round)
Estonia	2	0	0	0	Jüri Vips (2020 Spa-Francorchamps Formula 2 round)	Paul Aron (2024 Yas Island Formula 2 round)
Finland	1	0	0	0	Niko Kari (2018 Sochi Formula 2 round)	Niko Kari (2018 Yas Island Formula 2 round)
France	9	1 (Pourchaire)	1 (2023)	0	Norman Nato (2017 Sakhir Formula 2 round)	Victor Martins (2025 Yas Island Formula 2 round)
Germany	5	1 (Schumacher)	1 (2020)	1	Maximilian Günther (2018 Sakhir Formula 2 round)	Oliver Goethe (2026 Baku Formula 2 round)
India	3	0	0	1	Arjun Maini (2018 Sakhir Formula 2 round)	Kush Maini (2026 Baku Formula 2 round)
Indonesia	1	0	0	0	Sean Gelael (2017 Sakhir Formula 2 round)	Sean Gelael (2020 Sakhir Formula 2 round)
Ireland	1	0	0	1	Alex Dunne (2025 Melbourne Formula 2 round)	Alex Dunne (2026 Baku Formula 2 round)
Israel	1	0	0	0	Roy Nissany (2018 Sakhir Formula 2 round)	Roy Nissany (2023 Spielberg Formula 2 round)
Italy	9	1 (Fornaroli)	1 (2025)	1	Antonio Fuoco, Luca Ghiotto (2017 Sakhir Formula 2 round)	Gabriele Minì (2026 Baku Formula 2 round)
Japan	9	0	0	2	Nobuharu Matsushita (2017 Sakhir Formula 2 round)	Ritomo Miyata, Hiyu Yamakoshi (2026 Baku Formula 2 round)
Malaysia	1	0	0	0	Nabil Jeffri (2017 Sakhir Formula 2 round)	Nabil Jeffri (2017 Yas Island Formula 2 round)
Mexico	2	0	0	2	Rafael Villagómez (2024 Sakhir Formula 2 round)	Noel León, Rafael Villagómez (2026 Baku Formula 2 round)
Monaco	3	1 (Leclerc)	1 (2017)	0	Stefano Coletti, Charles Leclerc (2017 Sakhir Formula 2 round)	Arthur Leclerc (2023 Yas Island Formula 2 round)
Netherlands	6	1 (de Vries)	1 (2019)	1	Nyck de Vries (2017 Sakhir Formula 2 round)	Laurens van Hoepen (2026 Baku Formula 2 round)
New Zealand	2	0	0	0	Marcus Armstrong (2020 Spielberg Formula 2 round)	Marcus Armstrong, Liam Lawson (2022 Yas Island Formula 2 round)
Norway	2	0	0	1	Dennis Hauger (2022 Sakhir Formula 2 round)	Martinius Stenshorne (2026 Baku Formula 2 round)
Paraguay	1	0	0	1	Joshua Dürksen (2024 Sakhir Formula 2 round)	Joshua Dürksen (2026 Baku Formula 2 round)
Poland	1	0	0	1	Roman Bilinski (2026 Melbourne Formula 2 round)	Roman Bilinski (2026 Baku Formula 2 round)
Romania	1	0	0	0	Robert Vișoiu (2017 Monaco Formula 2 round)	Robert Vișoiu (2017 Monza Formula 2 round)
Russia	5	0	0	0	Artem Markelov (2017 Sakhir Formula 2 round)	Robert Shwartzman (2021 Yas Island Formula 2 round)
Spain	4	0	0	1	Sergio Canamasas (2017 Sakhir Formula 2 round)	Mari Boya (2026 Baku Formula 2 round)
Sweden	2	0	0	1	Gustav Malja (2017 Sakhir Formula 2 round)	Dino Beganovic (2026 Baku Formula 2 round)
Switzerland	2	0	0	0	Ralph Boschung, Louis Delétraz (2017 Sakhir Formula 2 round)	Ralph Boschung (2023 Yas Island Formula 2 round)
Thailand	2	0	0	1	Alexander Albon (2017 Sakhir Formula 2 round)	Tasanapol Inthraphuvasak (2026 Baku Formula 2 round)
Turkey	1	0	0	0	Cem Bölükbaşı (2022 Sakhir Formula 2 round)	Cem Bölükbaşı (2022 Budapest Formula 2 round)
United Kingdom	17	1 (Russell)	1 (2018)	2	Jordan King, Oliver Rowland (2017 Sakhir Formula 2 round)	John Bennett, Cian Shields (2026 Baku Formula 2 round)
United States	9	0	0	1	Santino Ferrucci (2017 Hungaroring Formula 2 round)	Colton Herta (2026 Baku Formula 2 round)
Venezuela	1	0	0	0	Johnny Cecotto Jr. (2017 Sakhir Formula 2 round)	Johnny Cecotto Jr. (2017 Baku Formula 2 round)

== See also ==
- List of FIA Formula 2 Championship race winners
