= List of FIA Formula 2 Championship race winners =

FIA Formula 2 Championship, is the support series of the FIA Formula One World Championship. The FIA Formula 2 Championship season consists of a series of races, divided to Feature (long distance) and Sprint (short races). Each winner is presented with a trophy and the results of each race are combined to determine two annual Championships, one for drivers and one for teams.

The first Formula 2 race winner was Artem Markelov in the 2017 Sakhir Feature race, and the most recent driver to score his first Formula 2 race win was Ritomo Miyata in the 2026 Madrid Sprint Race.

== Drivers' total wins ==
| # | Driver | Seasons | Races | Wins | % Wins | First win | Last win |
|---|---|---|---|---|---|---|---|
| 1 | (Netherlands) Nyck de Vries | 2017–2019 | 68 | 8 | 11.76% | 2017 Monte Carlo Sprint Race | 2019 Sochi Feature Race |
| 1 | (Russia) Artem Markelov | 2017–2020 | 74 | 8 | 10.81% | 2017 Sakhir Feature Race | 2018 Spielberg Sprint Race |
| 1 | (Brazil) Felipe Drugovich | 2020–2022 | 75 | 8 | 10.67% | 2020 Spielberg Sprint Race | 2022 Zandvoort Feature Race |
| 1 | (Netherlands) Richard Verschoor | 2021–2025 | 131 | 8 | 6.11% | 2021 Silverstone Sprint Race 2 | 2025 Lusail Sprint Race |
| 1 | (Paraguay) Joshua Dürksen | 2024–present | 80 | 8 | 10.00% | 2024 Baku Sprint Race | 2026 Monza Feature Race |
| 6 | (Monaco) Charles Leclerc | 2017 | 22 | 7 | 31.82% | 2017 Sakhir Sprint Race | 2017 Abu Dhabi Sprint Race |
| 6 | (United Kingdom) George Russell | 2018 | 24 | 7 | 29.17% | 2018 Baku Sprint Race | 2018 Abu Dhabi Feature Race |
| 6 | (Denmark) Frederik Vesti | 2022–2023 | 53 | 7 | 13.21% | 2022 Baku Sprint Race | 2023 Abu Dhabi Sprint Race |
| 6 | (United Kingdom) Oliver Bearman | 2023–2024 | 50 | 7 | 14.00% | 2023 Baku Sprint Race | 2024 Lusail Sprint Race |
| 10 | (Australia) Oscar Piastri | 2021 | 23 | 6 | 26.09% | 2021 Sakhir Sprint Race 1 | 2021 Abu Dhabi Feature Race |
| 10 | (Russia) Robert Shwartzman | 2020–2021 | 47 | 6 | 12.77% | 2020 2nd Spielberg Feature Race | 2021 Silverstone Sprint Race 1 |
| 10 | (Australia) Jack Doohan | 2021–2023 | 59 | 6 | 10.17% | 2022 Silverstone Sprint Race | 2023 Abu Dhabi Feature Race |
| 10 | (Canada) Nicholas Latifi | 2017–2019 | 68 | 6 | 8.82% | 2017 Silverstone Sprint Race | 2019 Budapest Feature Race |
| 10 | (France) Théo Pourchaire | 2020–2023 | 81 | 6 | 7.40% | 2021 Monaco Feature Race | 2023 Sakhir Feature Race |
| 10 | (Italy) Luca Ghiotto | 2017–2020, 2022 | 94 | 6 | 6.38% | 2017 Monza Sprint Race | 2020 Budapest Sprint Race |
| 10 | (United States) Jak Crawford | 2023–2025 | 82 | 6 | 7.32% | 2023 Spielberg Sprint Race | 2025 Baku Feature Race |
| 10 | (Bulgaria) Nikola Tsolov | 2025–present | 29 | 6 | 20.68% | 2026 Melbourne Feature Race | 2026 Silverstone Feature Race |
| 18 | (New Zealand) Liam Lawson | 2021–2022 | 51 | 5 | 9.80% | 2021 Sakhir Sprint Race 1 | 2022 Abu Dhabi Sprint Race |
| 18 | (Japan) Ayumu Iwasa | 2022–2023 | 54 | 5 | 9.26% | 2022 Le Castellet Feature Race | 2023 Monte Carlo Sprint Race |
| 18 | (Japan) Nobuharu Matsushita | 2017, 2019–2020 | 60 | 5 | 8.33% | 2017 Barcelona Sprint Race | 2020 Barcelona Feature Race |
| 18 | (China) Guanyu Zhou | 2019–2021 | 69 | 5 | 7.25% | 2020 Sochi Sprint Race | 2021 Abu Dhabi Sprint Race 2 |
| 18 | (Norway) Dennis Hauger | 2022–2024 | 78 | 5 | 6.41% | 2022 Monte Carlo Sprint Race | 2024 Jeddah Sprint Race |
| 23 | (Thailand) Alexander Albon | 2017–2018 | 46 | 4 | 8.70% | 2018 Baku Feature Race | 2018 Sochi Feature Race |
| 23 | (New Zealand) Marcus Armstrong | 2020–2022 | 75 | 4 | 5.33% | 2021 Jeddah Sprint Race 1 | 2022 Zandvoort Sprint Race |
| 23 | (United Kingdom) Jack Aitken | 2018–2021 | 77 | 4 | 5.20% | 2018 Barcelona Sprint Race | 2019 Monza Sprint Race |
| 23 | (India) Jehan Daruvala | 2020–2023 | 98 | 4 | 4.08% | 2020 2nd Sakhir Sprint Race | 2022 Monza Feature Race |
| 23 | (France) Isack Hadjar | 2023–2024 | 54 | 4 | 7.41% | 2024 Melbourne Feature Race | 2024 Spa-Francorchamps Feature Race |
| 23 | (Spain) Pepe Martí | 2024–2025 | 52 | 4 | 7.69% | 2024 Yas Island Sprint Race | 2025 Budapest Sprint Race |
| 23 | (Italy) Leonardo Fornaroli | 2024–2025 | 30 | 4 | 13.33% | 2025 Silverstone Sprint Race | 2025 Monza Sprint Race |
| 30 | (Japan) Yuki Tsunoda | 2020 | 24 | 3 | 12.50% | 2020 2nd Silverstone Sprint Race | 2020 2nd Sakhir Feature Race |
| 30 | (Italy) Antonio Fuoco | 2017–2018 | 46 | 3 | 6.52% | 2017 Monza Feature Race | 2018 Abu Dhabi Sprint Race |
| 30 | (Germany) Mick Schumacher | 2019–2020 | 46 | 3 | 6.52% | 2019 Budapest Sprint Race | 2020 Sochi Feature Race |
| 30 | (United Kingdom) Callum Ilott | 2017, 2019–2020 | 48 | 3 | 6.25% | 2020 Spielberg Feature Race | 2020 Monza Sprint Race |
| 30 | (United Kingdom) Dan Ticktum | 2018, 2020–2021 | 49 | 3 | 6.12% | 2020 Silverstone Sprint Race | 2021 Sochi Sprint Race |
| 30 | (Estonia) Jüri Vips | 2020–2022 | 59 | 3 | 5.09% | 2021 Baku Sprint Race 2 | 2022 Monza Sprint Race |
| 30 | (Brazil) Sérgio Sette Câmara | 2017–2019 | 68 | 3 | 4.41% | 2017 Spa-Francorchamps Sprint Race | 2019 Abu Dhabi Feature Race |
| 30 | (France) Victor Martins | 2023–2025 | 82 | 3 | 3.66% | 2023 Silverstone Feature Race | 2025 Lusail Feature Race |
| 30 | (United Kingdom) Arvid Lindblad | 2025 | 28 | 3 | 10.71% | 2025 Jeddah Sprint Race | 2025 Yas Island Sprint Race |
| 30 | (India) Kush Maini | 2023–present | 106 | 3 | 2.83% | 2024 Budapest Sprint Race | 2026 Barcelona Sprint Race |
| 30 | (Mexico) Noel León | 2026–present | 25 | 3 | 12.00% | 2026 Montreal Sprint Race | 2026 Budapest Feature Race |
| 30 | (Sweden) Dino Beganovic | 2024–present | 56 | 3 | 5.35% | 2025 Baku Sprint Race | 2026 Baku Sprint Race |
| 30 | (Republic of Ireland) Alex Dunne | 2025–present | 52 | 3 | 5.76% | 2025 Sakhir Feature Race | 2026 Baku Feature Race 1 |
| 30 | (Brazil) Rafael Câmara | 2026–present | 25 | 3 | 12.00% | 2026 Barcelona Feature Race | 2026 Baku Feature Race 2 |
| 43 | (France) Anthoine Hubert | 2019 | 16 | 2 | 12.50% | 2019 Monte Carlo Sprint Race | 2019 Le Castellet Sprint Race |
| 43 | (United Kingdom) Oliver Rowland | 2017 | 22 | 2 | 9.09% | 2017 Monte Carlo Feature Race | 2017 Budapest Feature Race |
| 43 | (United States) Logan Sargeant | 2021–2022 | 31 | 2 | 6.45% | 2022 Silverstone Feature Race | 2022 Spielberg Feature Race |
| 43 | (Russia) Nikita Mazepin | 2019–2020 | 46 | 2 | 4.35% | 2020 Silverstone Feature Race | 2020 Mugello Feature Race |
| 43 | (Denmark) Christian Lundgaard | 2019–2021 | 49 | 2 | 4.08% | 2020 2nd Spielberg Sprint Race | 2020 Mugello Sprint Race |
| 43 | (Brazil) Enzo Fittipaldi | 2021–2024 | 85 | 2 | 2.35% | 2023 Spa-Francorchamps Sprint Race | 2024 Jeddah Feature Race |
| 43 | (Barbados) Zane Maloney | 2022–2024 | 54 | 2 | 3.70% | 2024 Sakhir Sprint Race | 2024 Sakhir Feature Race |
| 43 | (Italy) Kimi Antonelli | 2024 | 28 | 2 | 7.14% | 2024 Silverstone Sprint Race | 2024 Budapest Feature Race |
| 43 | (Brazil) Gabriel Bortoleto | 2024 | 28 | 2 | 7.14% | 2024 Spielberg Feature Race | 2024 Monza Feature Race |
| 43 | (United Kingdom) Zak O'Sullivan | 2024 | 22 | 2 | 9.09% | 2024 Monte Carlo Feature Race | 2024 Spa-Francorchamps Sprint Race |
| 43 | (Czech Republic) Roman Staněk | 2023–2025 | 76 | 2 | 2.63% | 2024 Melbourne Sprint Race | 2025 Spa-Francorchamps Feature Race |
| 43 | (Italy) Gabriele Minì | 2024–present | 54 | 2 | 3.70% | 2026 Miami Feature Race | 2026 Budapest Sprint Race |
| 57 | (France) Norman Nato | 2017 | 22 | 1 | 4.55% | 2017 Baku Sprint Race | |
| 57 | (Germany) Maximilian Günther | 2018 | 22 | 1 | 4.55% | 2018 Silverstone Sprint Race | |
| 57 | (Japan) Tadasuke Makino | 2018 | 24 | 1 | 4.17% | 2018 Monza Feature Race | |
| 57 | (United Kingdom) Lando Norris | 2017–2018 | 26 | 1 | 3.85% | 2018 Sakhir Feature Race | |
| 57 | (Switzerland) Ralph Boschung | 2017–2023 | 120 | 1 | 0.83% | 2023 Sakhir Sprint Race | |
| 57 | (France) Clément Novalak | 2021–2023 | 58 | 1 | 1.72% | 2023 Zandvoort Feature Race | |
| 57 | (Argentina) Franco Colapinto | 2023–2024 | 22 | 1 | 4.55% | 2024 Imola Sprint Race | |
| 57 | (United Kingdom) Taylor Barnard | 2024 | 20 | 1 | 5.00% | 2024 Monte Carlo Sprint Race | |
| 57 | (Estonia) Paul Aron | 2023–2024 | 30 | 1 | 3.33% | 2024 Lusail Feature Race | |
| 57 | (United Kingdom) Luke Browning | 2024–2025 | 34 | 1 | 2.94% | 2025 Monza Feature Race | |
| 57 | (Norway) Martinius Stenshorne | 2025–present | 30 | 1 | 3.33% | 2026 Montreal Feature Race | |
| 57 | (United Kingdom) John Bennett | 2024–present | 56 | 1 | 1.78% | 2026 Spielberg Sprint Race | |
| 57 | (Japan) Ritomo Miyata | 2024–present | 80 | 1 | 1.25% | 2026 Madrid Sprint Race | |

== Teams' total wins ==
| # | Team | Seasons | Entries | Wins | Most successful drivers | First win | Last win |
|---|---|---|---|---|---|---|---|
| 1 | (Italy) Prema Racing | 2017–present | 248 | 44 | Bearman & Leclerc & Vesti (all 7), Piastri & Shwartzman (both 6) | 2017 Sakhir Sprint Race | 2024 Lusail Sprint Race |
| 2 | (France) ART Grand Prix | 2017–present | 248 | 29 | Russell (7), Pourchaire (6), de Vries (4) | 2017 Barcelona Sprint Race | 2026 Barcelona Sprint Race |
| 3 | (France) DAMS | 2017–present | 248 | 27 | Latifi (6), Iwasa & Crawford (both 5), Albon (4) | 2017 Monte Carlo Feature Race | 2025 Baku Feature Race |
| 4 | (Spain) Campos Racing | 2017–present | 248 | 24 | Tsolov (6), Hadjar & Martí (both 4), Aitken & Lindblad (both 3) | 2019 Baku Feature Race | 2026 Budapest Feature Race |
| 5 | (Netherlands) MP Motorsport | 2017–present | 248 | 21 | Drugovich (8), Verschoor (5), Hauger (3) | 2017 Spa-Francorchamps Sprint Race | 2026 Budapest Sprint Race |
| 6 | (United Kingdom) Carlin | 2018–2023 | 150 | 18 | Lawson (4), Daruvala & Tsunoda (both 3) | 2018 Sakhir Feature Race | 2023 Spa-Francorchamps Sprint Race |
| 6 | (United Kingdom) Virtuosi Racing | 2019–2023 | 126 | 18 | Zhou (5), Ghiotto (4), Doohan & Ilott (both 3) | 2019 Sakhir Sprint Race | 2023 Yas Island Feature Race |
| 8 | (United Kingdom) Hitech Grand Prix | 2020–present | 178 | 14 | Armstrong & Vips (both 3), Mazepin (2) | 2020 Budapest Sprint Race | 2025 Baku Sprint Race |
| 8 | (United Kingdom) Invicta Racing | 2024–present | 78 | 14 | Fornaroli & Dürksen (both 4), Bortoleto & Maini & Câmara (all 2) | 2024 Spielberg Feature Race | 2026 Monza Feature Race |
| 10 | (Russia) Russian Time | 2017–2018 | 46 | 10 | Markelov (8), Ghiotto & Makino (both 1) | 2017 Sakhir Feature Race | 2018 Monza Feature Race |
| 11 | (Germany) (United Arab Emirates) AIX | 2024–present | 78 | 5 | Dürksen (4), Barnard (1) | 2024 Monte Carlo Sprint Race | 2025 Yas Island Feature Race |
| 11 | (New Zealand) Rodin | 2024–present | 78 | 5 | Maloney & Dunne (both 2) | 2024 Sakhir Sprint Race | 2026 Montreal Feature Race |
| 11 | (Italy) Trident Racing | 2017–present | 248 | 5 | Verschoor (2), Novalak & Staněk & Bennett (all 1) | 2022 Sakhir Sprint Race | 2026 Spielberg Sprint Race |
| 14 | (United Kingdom) Arden International | 2017–2019 | 68 | 4 | Hubert (2), Günther & Nato (both 1) | 2017 Baku Sprint Race | 2019 Le Castellet Sprint Race |
| 15 | (Czech Republic) Charouz Racing System | 2018–2022 | 140 | 2 | Fuoco (2) | 2018 Monte Carlo Sprint Race | 2018 Abu Dhabi Sprint Race |
| 15 | (Netherlands) Van Amersfoort Racing | 2022–present | 130 | 2 | Verschoor & Fittipaldi (both 1) | 2023 Spielberg Feature Race | 2024 Jeddah Feature Race |
| 17 | (Italy) Rapax | 2017 | 22 | 1 | de Vries (1) | 2017 Monte Carlo Sprint Race | |

== Countries' total wins ==
| # | Country | Seasons | Wins | First win | Last win |
|---|---|---|---|---|---|
| 1 | United Kingdom | 2017–present | 35 | 2017 Monte Carlo Feature Race | 2026 Spielberg Sprint Race |
| 2 | Brazil | 2017–2024, 2026–present | 18 | 2017 Spa-Francorchamps Sprint Race | 2026 Baku Feature Race 2 |
| 3 | France | 2017–2025 | 17 | 2017 Baku Sprint Race | 2025 Lusail Feature Race |
| 3 | Italy | 2017–2022, 2024–present | 17 | 2017 Monza Feature Race | 2026 Budapest Sprint Race |
| 5 | Russia | 2017–2021 | 16 | 2017 Sakhir Feature Race | 2021 Silverstone Sprint Race 2 |
| 5 | Netherlands | 2017–2019, 2021–present | 16 | 2017 Monte Carlo Sprint Race | 2025 Lusail Sprint Race |
| 7 | Japan | 2017–present | 15 | 2017 Barcelona Sprint Race | 2026 Madrid Sprint Race |
| 8 | Australia | 2021–2025 | 12 | 2021 Sakhir Sprint Race 2 | 2023 Abu Dhabi Feature Race |
| 9 | New Zealand | 2020–2022 | 9 | 2021 Sakhir Sprint Race 1 | 2022 Abu Dhabi Sprint Race |
| 9 | Denmark | 2019–2023 | 9 | 2020 2nd Spielberg Sprint Race | 2023 Abu Dhabi Sprint Race |
| 11 | United States | 2017–2019, 2021–present | 8 | 2022 Silverstone Feature Race | 2025 Baku Feature Race |
| 11 | Paraguay | 2024–present | 8 | 2024 Baku Sprint Race | 2026 Monza Feature Race |
| 13 | Monaco | 2017, 2023 | 7 | 2017 Sakhir Sprint Race | 2017 Abu Dhabi Sprint Race |
| 13 | India | 2018–present | 7 | 2020 2nd Sakhir Sprint Race | 2026 Barcelona Sprint Race |
| 15 | Canada | 2017–2019 | 6 | 2017 Silverstone Sprint Race | 2019 Budapest Feature Race |
| 15 | Norway | 2022–present | 6 | 2022 Monte Carlo Sprint Race | 2026 Montreal Feature Race |
| 15 | Bulgaria | 2025–present | 6 | 2026 Melbourne Feature Race | 2026 Silverstone Feature Race |
| 18 | China | 2019–2021 | 5 | 2020 Sochi Sprint Race | 2021 Abu Dhabi Sprint Race 2 |
| 19 | Thailand | 2017–2018, 2025–present | 4 | 2018 Baku Feature Race | 2018 Sochi Feature Race |
| 19 | Germany | 2018–2022, 2024–present | 4 | 2018 Silverstone Sprint Race | 2020 Sochi Feature Race |
| 19 | Estonia | 2020–2024 | 4 | 2021 Baku Sprint Race 2 | 2024 Lusail Feature Race |
| 19 | Spain | 2017–2018, 2022, 2024–present | 4 | 2024 Yas Island Sprint Race | 2025 Budapest Sprint Race |
| 23 | Mexico | 2024–present | 3 | 2026 Montreal Sprint Race | 2026 Budapest Feature Race |
| 23 | Sweden | 2017, 2024–present | 3 | 2025 Baku Sprint Race | 2026 Baku Sprint Race |
| 23 | Republic of Ireland | 2025–present | 3 | 2025 Sakhir Feature Race | 2026 Baku Feature Race 1 |
| 26 | Barbados | 2022–2024 | 2 | 2024 Sakhir Sprint Race | 2024 Sakhir Feature Race |
| 26 | Czech Republic | 2023–2025 | 2 | 2024 Melbourne Sprint Race | 2025 Spa-Francorchamps Feature Race |
| 28 | Switzerland | 2017–2023 | 1 | 2023 Sakhir Sprint Race | |
| 28 | Argentina | 2023–2024, 2026 | 1 | 2024 Imola Sprint Race | |
