= 2018 Sakhir Formula 2 round =

Motor racing competition

2018 Bahrain Formula 2 round
Round details
- Round 1 of 12 in the 2018 FIA Formula 2 Championship.
- Layout of the Bahrain International Circuit
- Location: Bahrain International Circuit, Sakhir, Bahrain
- Course: Permanent racing facility 5.406 km (3.359 mi)

Feature race
- Date: 7 April 2018
- Laps: 31 (Note: The feature race was scheduled to be run over 32 laps. Artem Markelov and Roberto Merhi stalled on the grid, requiring a second formation lap. The race distance was subsequently adjusted to 31 laps.)
Pole position
Driver	(United Kingdom) Lando Norris	Carlin
Time	1:41.761	
Podium
First	(United Kingdom) Lando Norris	Carlin
Second	(Brazil) Sérgio Sette Câmara	Carlin
Third	(Russia) Artem Markelov	Russian Time
Fastest lap
Driver	(United Kingdom) Lando Norris	Carlin
- Time: 1:48.072 (on lap 19)

Sprint race
- Date: 8 April 2018
- Laps: 23
Podium
First	(Russia) Artem Markelov	Russian Time
Second	(Germany) Maximilian Günther	BWT Arden
Third	(Brazil) Sérgio Sette Câmara	Carlin
Fastest lap
Driver	(Netherlands) Nyck de Vries	Pertamina Prema Theodore Racing
- Time: 1:47.711 (on lap 11)

The 2018 Bahrain FIA Formula 2 round was a pair of motor races for Formula 2 cars that took place on 7 and 8 April 2018 at the Bahrain International Circuit in Sakhir, Bahrain as part of the FIA Formula 2 Championship. It was the first round of the 2018 FIA Formula 2 Championship and ran in support of the 2018 Bahrain Grand Prix.

The round saw the competitive début of the new Dallara F2 2018 chassis and its turbocharged Mecachrome engine. The F2 2018 was introduced as a replacement for the aging Dallara GP2/11 chassis and its naturally-aspirated engine, which had been used by the championship and its predecessor, the GP2 Series since 2011.

== Report ==
=== Background ===
The race saw the introduction of a brand new chassis to replace the Dallara GP2/11 which had been used since 2011 when the series was known as the GP2 Series. The new car, the Dallara F2 2018, features substantial technical revisions to its design, making it similar to the current Formula One cars. It features the "halo" cockpit protection device for driver head protection and is also powered by a brand new engine, a 3.4 litre (207 cu in) single-turbocharged V6 engine developed by Mecachrome. This was brought in as a replacement for the 4.0 litre (244 cu in) naturally aspirated V8 engine which was used since the GP2 Series began back in 2005.

Driver changes for this season saw reigning champion Charles Leclerc join Formula One with the Alfa Romeo Sauber team, replacing Pascal Wehrlein. His teammate from Prema Racing last year, Antonio Fuoco, joined the new Charouz Racing System team, joining Louis Delétraz, who joined the team after racing with Racing Engineering and Rapax in 2017. Reigning teams' champions Russian Time signed Japanese driver Tadasuke Makino to partner Artem Markelov. Luca Ghiotto, who raced for Russian Time in 2017, joined Campos Racing. DAMS signed Alexander Albon to replace Oliver Rowland, Prema Racing brought in Sean Gelael and Nyck de Vries, and MP Motorsport signed Roberto Merhi and Ralph Boschung, who were also teammates at Campos at the Catalunya round in 2017.

Other débutants this season were Roy Nissany, son of Chanoch Nissany, who joined Campos, Maximilian Günther and Nirei Fukuzumi, who both moved up from the FIA Formula 3 European Championship and GP3 Series respectively with BWT Arden, Arjun Maini, who also graduated from the GP3 Series, joined Trident, partnering Santino Ferrucci. ART Grand Prix promoted Jack Aitken and reigning GP3 Series champion George Russell to their F2 team, and Lando Norris began his first full season with Carlin.

=== Qualifying ===
Two Formula 2 full-time rookies Lando Norris and George Russell occupied the front row of the grid. While the second row was locked by more experienced Alexander Albon and Nyck de Vries.

=== Feature race ===
After starting from pole Lando Norris dominated the race, finishing ahead of his teammate Sérgio Sette Câmara with almost seven second margin. Sette Câmara defended his runner-up spot on the podium after pressure in the final laps from Russian Time driver Artem Markelov, who was forced to start from pitlane after stalling on the grid. Alexander Albon finished ahead of Russell, who was the highest-placed driver without previous Formula 2 starts. The Prema pairing of Nyck de Vries and Sean Gelael finished behind Russell. Rookie Maximilian Günther finished eighth and subsequently started from pole in the sprint race. Russell's teammate and another rookie driver Jack Aitken finished ninth. Ralph Boschung completed the top-ten. Nicholas Latifi, Luca Ghiotto, Louis Delétraz and Santino Ferrucci were unable to use their experience to score points. Arjun Maini and Roy Nissany finished 15th and 16th on their F2 race debut. Antonio Fuoco finished ahead of the pair of the Japanese rookies Nirei Fukuzumi and Tadasuke Makino, who were the last finished drivers. Like Markelov, Roberto Merhi stalled on the grid, but was unable to start the race from pit lane.

=== Sprint race ===
Artem Markelov took his first victory of the season with Maximilian Günther second, Sérgio Sette Câmara rounding out the podium in third and Lando Norris fourth. The final points places went to Nyck de Vries, who also set the fastest lap, Luca Ghiotto, Ralph Boschung, and Nirei Fukuzumi scored his first points with 8th. All drivers finished in this race, with Santino Ferrucci the last finisher in 20th place.

== Classification ==
=== Qualifying ===
Pos.	No.	Driver	Team	Time	Gap	Grid
1	19	(United Kingdom) Lando Norris	Carlin	1:41.761	–	1
2	8	(United Kingdom) George Russell	ART Grand Prix	1:41.823	+0.062	2
3	5	(Thailand) Alexander Albon	DAMS	1:41.850	+0.089	3
4	4	(Netherlands) Nyck de Vries	Pertamina Prema Theodore Racing	1:41.880	+0.119	4
5	20	(Switzerland) Louis Delétraz	Charouz Racing System	1:42.174	+0.413	5
6	18	(Brazil) Sérgio Sette Câmara	Carlin	1:42.221	+0.460	6
7	12	(Japan) Nirei Fukuzumi	BWT Arden	1:42.246	+0.485	7
8	2	(Japan) Tadasuke Makino	Russian Time	1:42.264	+0.503	8
9	7	(United Kingdom) Jack Aitken	ART Grand Prix	1:42.282	+0.521	9
10	11	(Germany) Maximilian Günther	BWT Arden	1:42.336	+0.575	10
11	21	(Italy) Antonio Fuoco	Charouz Racing System	1:42.342	+0.581	11
12	14	(Italy) Luca Ghiotto	Campos Vexatec Racing	1:42.414	+0.653	12
13	9	(Spain) Roberto Merhi	MP Motorsport	1:42.423	+0.662	13
14	16	(India) Arjun Maini	Trident	1:42.437	+0.676	14
15	6	(Canada) Nicholas Latifi	DAMS	1:42.447	+0.686	15
16	10	(Switzerland) Ralph Boschung	MP Motorsport	1:42.460	+0.699	16
17	1	(Russia) Artem Markelov	Russian Time	1:42.816	+1.055	17
18	17	(United States) Santino Ferrucci	Trident	1:42.818	+1.057	18
19	3	(Indonesia) Sean Gelael	Pertamina Prema Theodore Racing	1:43.016	+1.255	19
20	15	(Israel) Roy Nissany	Campos Vexatec Racing	1:43.350	+1.589	20

=== Feature race ===
Pos.	No.	Driver	Entrant	Laps	Time/Retired	Grid	Points
1	19	(United Kingdom) Lando Norris	Carlin	31	57:46.206	1	25 (6)
2	18	(Brazil) Sérgio Sette Câmara	Carlin	31	+8.321	6	18
3	1	(Russia) Artem Markelov	Russian Time	31	+8.532	PL^{1}	15
4	5	(Thailand) Alexander Albon	DAMS	31	+9.349	3	12
5	8	(United Kingdom) George Russell	ART Grand Prix	31	+13.947	2	10
6	4	(Netherlands) Nyck de Vries	Pertamina Prema Theodore Racing	31	+14.661	4	8
7	3	(Indonesia) Sean Gelael	Pertamina Prema Theodore Racing	31	+19.326	19	6
8	11	(Germany) Maximilian Günther	BWT Arden	31	+22.573	10	4
9	7	(United Kingdom) Jack Aitken	ART Grand Prix	31	+28.559	9	2
10	10	(Switzerland) Ralph Boschung	MP Motorsport	31	+31.585	16	1
11	6	(Canada) Nicholas Latifi	DAMS	31	+35.514	15	
12	14	(Italy) Luca Ghiotto	Campos Vexatec Racing	31	+44.273	12	
13	20	(Switzerland) Louis Delétraz	Charouz Racing System	31	+49.429	5	
14	17	(United States) Santino Ferrucci	Trident	31	+55.424	18	
15	16	(India) Arjun Maini	Trident	31	+57.453	14	
16	15	(Israel) Roy Nissany	Campos Vexatec Racing	31	+1:27.436	20	
17	21	(Italy) Antonio Fuoco	Charouz Racing System	31	+1:47.169	11	
18	12	(Japan) Nirei Fukuzumi	BWT Arden	31	+1:50.462	7	
19	2	(Japan) Tadasuke Makino	Russian Time	30	+1 lap	8	
DNS	9	(Spain) Roberto Merhi	MP Motorsport	0	Hydraulics	PL^{2}	
Fastest Lap: (United Kingdom) Lando Norris (Carlin) — 1:48.072 (on lap 19)

Notes

- ^1 – Artem Markelov started from pit lane after stalling on the grid.
- ^2 – Roberto Merhi stalled on the grid and was due to start the race from pit lane, but was unable to restart the car.

=== Sprint race ===
Pos.	No.	Driver	Entrant	Laps	Time/Retired	Grid	Points
1	1	(Russia) Artem Markelov	Russian Time	23	42:42.161	6	15
2	11	(Germany) Maximilian Günther	BWT Arden	23	+2.106	1	12
3	18	(Brazil) Sérgio Sette Câmara	Carlin	23	+3.803	7	10
4	19	(United Kingdom) Lando Norris	Carlin	23	+5.043	8	8
5	4	(Netherlands) Nyck de Vries	Pertamina Prema Theodore Racing	23	+10.265	3	6 (2)
6	14	(Italy) Luca Ghiotto	Campos Vexatec Racing	23	+15.696	12	4
7	10	(Switzerland) Ralph Boschung	MP Motorsport	23	+23.511	10	2
8	12	(Japan) Nirei Fukuzumi	BWT Arden	23	+24.582	18	1
9	20	(Switzerland) Louis Delétraz	Charouz Racing System	23	+25.194	13	
10	6	(Canada) Nicholas Latifi	DAMS	23	+25.687	11	
11	9	(Spain) Roberto Merhi	MP Motorsport	23	+25.804	20	
12	21	(Italy) Antonio Fuoco	Charouz Racing System	23	+26.638	17	
13	5	(Thailand) Alexander Albon	DAMS	23	+31.759	5	
14	16	(India) Arjun Maini	Trident	23	+36.793	15	
15	15	(Israel) Roy Nissany	Campos Vexatec Racing	23	+43.989	16	
16	3	(Indonesia) Sean Gelael	Pertamina Prema Theodore Racing	23	+57.845	2	
17	2	(Japan) Tadasuke Makino	Russian Time	23	+1:03.819	19	
18	7	(United Kingdom) Jack Aitken	ART Grand Prix	23	+1:39.757	9	
19	8	(United Kingdom) George Russell	ART Grand Prix	22	+1 lap	4	
20	17	(United States) Santino Ferrucci	Trident	22	+1 lap	14	
Fastest lap: (Netherlands) Nyck de Vries (Pertamina Prema Theodore Racing) — 1:47.711 (on lap 11)

== Championship standings after the round ==
Drivers' Championship standings

Pos.	Driver	Points
1	(United Kingdom) Lando Norris	39
2	(Russia) Artem Markelov	30
3	(Brazil) Sérgio Sette Câmara	28
4	(Germany) Maximilian Günther	16
5	(Netherlands) Nyck de Vries	16

Teams' Championship standings

Pos.	Entrant	Points
1	(United Kingdom) Carlin	67
2	(Russia) Russian Time	30
3	(Italy) Pertamina Prema Theodore Racing	22
4	(United Kingdom) BWT Arden	17
5	(France) DAMS	12

== Notes ==
Previous round: 2017 Yas Island Formula 2 round	FIA Formula 2 Championship; 2018 season	Next round: 2018 Baku Formula 2 round
Previous round: 2017 Sakhir Formula 2 round	Sakhir Formula 2 round	Next round: 2019 Sakhir Formula 2 round
