= 2017 Sakhir Formula 2 round =

Pair of motor races held in Bahrain

2017 Bahrain Formula 2 round
Round details
- Round 1 of 11 in the 2017 FIA Formula 2 Championship.
- Layout of the Bahrain International Circuit
- Location: Bahrain International Circuit, Sakhir, Bahrain
- Course: Permanent racing facility 5.406 km (3.359 mi)

Feature race
- Date: 15 April 2017
- Laps: 32
Pole position
Driver	(Monaco) Charles Leclerc	Prema Racing
Time	1:38.907	
Podium
First	(Russia) Artem Markelov	Russian Time
Second	(France) Norman Nato	Arden International
Third	(Monaco) Charles Leclerc	Prema Racing
Fastest lap
Driver	(Russia) Artem Markelov	Russian Time
- Time: 1:46.038 (on 24)

Sprint race
- Date: 16 April 2017
- Laps: 23
Podium
First	(Monaco) Charles Leclerc	Prema Racing
Second	(Italy) Luca Ghiotto	Russian Time
Third	(United Kingdom) Oliver Rowland	DAMS
Fastest lap
Driver	(Monaco) Charles Leclerc	Prema Racing
- Time: 1:44.074 (on 16)

The 2017 Bahrain FIA Formula 2 round was a pair of motor races held on 15 and 16 April 2017 at the Bahrain International Circuit in Sakhir, Bahrain as part of the FIA Formula 2 Championship. It was the first round of the 2017 FIA Formula 2 Championship and was run in support of the 2017 Bahrain Grand Prix.

Following the 2016 GP2 Series, the championship was renamed the FIA Formula 2 Championship. The feature race was won by Artem Markelov whilst the sprint race was won by rookie Charles Leclerc.

== Report ==
=== Background ===
Beyond the name change for the championship, there were some other major changes in the off-season. Both drivers from last year's Prema Racing, Pierre Gasly and Antonio Giovinazzi, left the championship for different championships. Gasly left the championship as the defending champion and subsequently went to race in the Super Formula Championship, having missed out on a drive in Formula One with Scuderia Toro Rosso. Although, he would remain as a reserve driver for the team as well as a test driver for the Red Bull outfit. He later made his Formula One début at the 2017 Malaysian Grand Prix, replacing Daniil Kvyat, then returning for the Mexican Grand Prix to partner New Zealander Brendon Hartley. Meanwhile, Giovinazzi would realize his Formula One dream, driving for Sauber, covering for the injured Pascal Wehrlein in the Australian Grand Prix and the Chinese Grand Prix as well as acting as a reserve driver for Scuderia Ferrari and Sauber F1 Team. In their place would be Ferrari junior drivers Charles Leclerc and Antonio Fuoco. With Leclerc being the reigning GP3 champion and Prema Racing being the champion team from 2016, this was already a hotly-favored combination for the 2017 championship.

Debutants this year also included Alexander Albon, Ralph Boschung, Sérgio Sette Câmara and Nyck de Vries. Albon finished second in the previous years GP3 Series and was a constant front-runner. He would join the ART Grand Prix-outfit, joining McLaren driver, Nobuharu Matsushita. Boschung joins the championship off the back of a moderately-successful GP3 campaign, where he won the sprint race at the Red Bull Ring, driving for Koiranen GP. Joining the Campos Racing-outfit, he would partner a driver with experience in the championship - Stefano Coletti. After spending a couple years away from the championship, Coletti would return for his fifth attempt at the GP2/Formula Two title. Câmara would join MP Motorsport, filling the void left by the departing Oliver Rowland. Câmara had a relatively-successful year in Formula Three achieving third at the Masters of Formula 3 and again at the Macau Grand Prix, as well as a achieving modest results in the European Formula 3 Championship. He would partner Jordan King, who would attempt his third season in the championship. De Vries joined the Rapax team, joining experienced driver, Johnny Cecotto Jr. De Vries is a McLaren junior driver who has had success in the lower formula. Driving for ART Grand Prix in the 2016 GP3 Series season, De Vries became faster as the season progressed and was a regular front-runner throughout the season.

=== Practice and qualifying ===
Oliver Rowland drew first blood in the sole practice session of the weekend, with Artem Markelov in second and rookie-Charles Leclerc in third. Conditions were clear, with the track temperature rising up to 45˚C. The practice session saw the teams mainly focus on race pace and so little movement occurred on the leaderboard.

For qualifying, Charles Leclerc adopted a bold, yet successful strategy to take his first FIA Formula 2 Championship pole position on his debut. Antonio Fuoco was second fastest in the session, however would later be penalised three grid spots after being deemed to have impeded Artem Markelov. This elevated another rookie, Nyck de Vries up into the front row for the first race. During the dying moments of qualifying, drivers were beginning to set some fast times. However, all these efforts would be in vain after contact between Nabil Jeffri and Gustav Malja left both cars stricken on the side of the circuit, bringing out the VSC (Virtual Safety Car) and effectively and end to all qualifying efforts for the evening. As Jeffri approached turn nine, Malja (who was not on a flying lap) went from the outside the inside line, into the path of Jeffri, causing a collision. The stewards deemed Malja to be at fault and subsequently was handed a five-place grid penalty for driving in a potentially dangerous manner and causing a collision.

Other penalties from the qualifying session included Sean Gelael, Sergio Canamasas and Stefano Coletti, all of whom failed to slow sufficiently for the VSC.

=== Races ===
==== Feature Race ====
Leclerc leaped off the line, into an early lead with Norman Nato in hot pursuit. De Vries wasted his front row start and dropped down to fourth, while Markelov moved into the top three. After a few laps, Nato's persistence led to a pass into turn one, giving Nato the lead. A couple laps later, Nato's pace started to decline and Leclerc would retake the lead; all the while, Markelov being the watching brief.

Markelov's tyre management paid dividends, passing Nato and closing rapidly on Leclerc as the pitstops started to come into effect. On lap 14, Nato pitted for soft tyres and used the fresh rubber to close the gap to Leclerc, who pitted one lap later. Almost immediately after exiting the pits, Leclerc came under attack from Nato, with the latter taking the lead around the outside of turn four. Markelov then pitted for new tyres, but by now, the gap was extensive and victory seemed unlikely. However, when the race went into the final stages, Leclerc and Nato's pace fell by the wayside, whilst Markelov maintained a strong pace. Markelov passed Leclerc coming out of the final corner on lap 29 and closed on Nato to overtake him as well.

Meanwhile, further down the field, Jordan King passed Oliver Rowland to take fourth place, whilst the battle for sixth saw Alexander Albon pass Nyck de Vries, who by this stage was falling down the order rapidly due to seriously-degraded tyres. Luca Ghiotto and Nobuharu Matsushita finished in seventh and eight respectively, giving both a front row start for the sprint race.

With the superior pace and tyre management, Markelov took the first win of the 2017 FIA Formula 2 Championship and cemented his campaign for the championship.

==== Sprint Race ====
Charles Leclerc won a thrilling sprint race, despite pitting for fresh tyres earlier in the race. The Monegasque driver started from sixth on the grid and promptly drove to the front to grab an early lead. Despite the early lead, Prema decided to adopt a one-stop strategy seeing as how tyre management was an issue for both Prema drivers.

Even before the race started, there was already drama unfolding. Nobuharu Matsushita had to start the race from the pitlane after having failed to leave for the grid in time; leaving the number-one grid slot vacant and giving his teammate, Alexander Albon a clear view into turn one. Albon used this to launch an attack on Luca Ghiotto into turn one, however Ghiotto emerged as the leader. For the second race in succession, there was no accident at the first corner, with all drivers maintaining composure throughout. That was, until after turn four, where contact between Rowland and Nato saw the Frenchman spin off the circuit with a flat right-rear tyre and significant damage to his car. From this point, the race was relatively clean, although intriguing battles initiated throughout the field.

On lap 14, Markelov pitted for fresh rubber, adopting a strategy which was seemingly unnecessary given the exceptional tyre management achieved in the feature race. A lap later, Leclerc pitted as well. This was unexpected as Leclerc was in the lead and was driving away from the second-placed driver, Ghiotto. Leclerc exited the pits ahead of Markelov, but a long way behind the leaders and with a gap that seemed impossible to close. However, as the laps counted down, Leclerc's seemingly impossible attempt at victory became more and more possible. Deducting three seconds out of the gap to the leader per lap, on average, he all of a sudden found himself being behind Rowland and Ghiotto heading into the final lap. Using DRS, Leclerc passed Rowland into turn one and set his sights on Ghiotto for the lead. Ghiotto defended well into turn three, but locked up, handing the lead and eventually, the win to Leclerc. From there, it was a formality with Leclerc taking the win, Ghiotto second and Rowland third.

With this victory, Leclerc left the round in the lead of the championship and whilst Prema didn't leave with the lead of the team's championship, they had clearly demonstrated that they were, once again, the team to beat.

== Classifications ==
=== Qualifying ===
Pos.	No.	Driver	Team	Time	Gap	Grid
1	1	(Monaco) Charles Leclerc	Prema Racing	1:38.907	–	1
2	2	(Italy) Antonio Fuoco	Prema Racing	1:39.585	+0.678	5^{1}
3	18	(Netherlands) Nyck de Vries	Rapax	1:39.665	+0.758	2
4	20	(France) Norman Nato	Arden International	1:39.696	+0.789	3
5	5	(Italy) Luca Ghiotto	Russian Time	1:39.948	+1.041	4
6	7	(Japan) Nobuharu Matsushita	ART Grand Prix	1:40.011	+1.104	6
7	6	(Russia) Artem Markelov	Russian Time	1:40.018	+1.111	7
8	9	(United Kingdom) Oliver Rowland	DAMS	1:40.053	+1.146	8
9	8	(Thailand) Alexander Albon	ART Grand Prix	1:40.140	+1.233	9
10	14	(Brazil) Sérgio Sette Câmara	MP Motorsport	1:40.168	+1.261	10
11	15	(United Kingdom) Jordan King	MP Motorsport	1:40.201	+1.294	11
12	19	(Venezuela) Johnny Cecotto Jr.	Rapax	1:40.262	+1.355	12
13	10	(Canada) Nicholas Latifi	DAMS	1:40.280	+1.373	13
14	3	(Switzerland) Louis Delétraz	Racing Engineering	1:40.453	+1.546	14
15	4	(Sweden) Gustav Malja	Racing Engineering	1:40.473	+1.566	17^{2}
16	11	(Switzerland) Ralph Boschung	Campos Racing	1:40.501	+1.594	15
17	21	(Indonesia) Sean Gelael	Arden International	1:40.778	+1.871	18^{3}
18	17	(Spain) Sergio Canamasas	Trident	1:40.810	+1.903	19^{3}
19	12	(Monaco) Stefano Coletti	Campos Racing	1:41.416	+2.509	20^{3}
20	16	(Malaysia) Nabil Jeffri	Trident	1:41.604	+2.697	16

Notes

1. – Antonio Fuoco was handed a three-place grid penalty for impeding Artem Markelov during the qualifying session.
2. – Gustav Malja was handed a five-place grid penalty for causing a collision for Nabil Jeffri during the qualifying session.
3. – Sean Gelael, Sergio Canamasas and Stefano Coletti were all handed five-place grid penalties for failing to slow sufficiently for the VSC.

=== Feature Race ===
Pos.	No.	Driver	Team	Laps	Time / Gap	Grid	Points
1	6	(Russia) Artem Markelov	Russian Time	32	58:18.977	7	25 (2)
2	20	(France) Norman Nato	Arden International	32	+7.891	3	18
3	1	(Monaco) Charles Leclerc	Prema Racing	32	+13.780	1	15 (4)
4	15	(United Kingdom) Jordan King	MP Motorsport	32	+17.478	11	12
5	9	(United Kingdom) Oliver Rowland	DAMS	32	+18.144	8	10
6	8	(Thailand) Alexander Albon	ART Grand Prix	32	+19.744	9	8
7	5	(Italy) Luca Ghiotto	Russian Time	32	+27.056	4	6
8	7	(Japan) Nobuharu Matsushita	ART Grand Prix	32	+29.971	6	4
9	2	(Italy) Antonio Fuoco	Prema Racing	32	+30.950	5	2
10	18	(Netherlands) Nyck de Vries	Rapax	32	+35.726	2	1
11	10	(Canada) Nicholas Latifi	DAMS	32	+47.578	13	
12	11	(Switzerland) Ralph Boschung	Campos Racing	32	+52.529	15	
13	14	(Brazil) Sérgio Sette Câmara	MP Motorsport	32	+55.146^{4}	10	
14	17	(Spain) Sergio Canamasas	Trident	32	+56.311	19	
15	19	(Venezuela) Johnny Cecotto Jr.	Rapax	32	+1:06.723	12	
16	12	(Monaco) Stefano Coletti	Campos Racing	32	+1:12.933	20	
17	21	(Indonesia) Sean Gelael	Arden International	32	+1:18.579	18	
18	4	(Sweden) Gustav Malja	Racing Engineering	32	+1:24.483	17	
19	16	(Malaysia) Nabil Jeffri	Trident	32	+1:38.982	16	
20	3	(Switzerland) Louis Delétraz	Racing Engineering	32	+1:39.106	14	
Fastest lap: (Russia) Artem Markelov (Russian Time) – 1:46.038 (on lap 24)

Notes

1. – Sérgio Sette Câmara was handed a five-second time penalty after stewards deemed him to have forced another driver off the road.

=== Sprint Race ===
Pos.	No.	Driver	Team	Laps	Time / Gap	Grid	Points
1	1	(Monaco) Charles Leclerc	Prema Racing	23	43:01.023	6	15 (2)
2	5	(Italy) Luca Ghiotto	Russian Time	23	+1.569	2	12
3	9	(United Kingdom) Oliver Rowland	DAMS	23	+2.898	4	10
4	10	(Canada) Nicholas Latifi	DAMS	23	+7.575	11	8
5	15	(United Kingdom) Jordan King	MP Motorsport	23	+9.962	5	6
6	18	(Netherlands) Nyck de Vries	Rapax	23	+10.865	10	4
7	8	(Thailand) Alexander Albon	ART Grand Prix	23	+11.382	3	2
8	6	(Russia) Artem Markelov	Russian Time	23	+18.953	8	1
9	19	(Venezuela) Johnny Cecotto Jr.	Rapax	23	+19.150	15	
10	2	(Italy) Antonio Fuoco	Prema Racing	23	+19.983	9	
11	17	(Spain) Sergio Canamasas	Trident	23	+28.829	14	
12	3	(Switzerland) Louis Delétraz	Racing Engineering	23	+31.187	20	
13	4	(Sweden) Gustav Malja	Racing Engineering	23	+33.622	18	
14	7	(Japan) Nobuharu Matsushita	ART Grand Prix	23	+34.392	1	
15	12	(Monaco) Stefano Coletti	Campos Racing	23	+35.901	16	
16	16	(Malaysia) Nabil Jeffri	Trident	23	+41.595	19	
17	21	(Indonesia) Sean Gelael	Arden International	23	+52.029	17	
18	14	(Brazil) Sérgio Sette Câmara	MP Motorsport	23	+1:08.570	13	
DNF	11	(Switzerland) Ralph Boschung	Campos Racing	9	Suspension	12	
DNF	20	(France) Norman Nato	Arden International	0	Spun off	7	
Fastest lap: (Monaco) Charles Leclerc (Prema Racing) – 1:44.074 (on lap 16)

== Championship standings after the round ==
Drivers' Championship standings

Pos.	Driver	Points
1	(Monaco) Charles Leclerc	36
2	(Russia) Artem Markelov	28
3	(United Kingdom) Oliver Rowland	20
4	(Italy) Luca Ghiotto	18
5	(France) Norman Nato	18

Teams' Championship standings

Pos.	Team	Points
1	(Russia) Russian Time	46
2	(Italy) Prema Racing	38
3	(France) DAMS	28
4	(United Kingdom) Arden International	18
5	(Netherlands) MP Motorsport	18

- Note: Only the top five positions are included for both sets of standings.

Previous round: 2016 Yas Marina GP2 Series round	FIA Formula 2 Championship; 2017 season	Next round: 2017 Barcelona Formula 2 round
Previous round: 2015 Bahrain 2nd GP2 Series round	Sakhir Formula 2 round	Next round: 2018 Sakhir Formula 2 round
