= 2017 Formula 2 Championship =

1st edition of FIA Formula 2 Championship

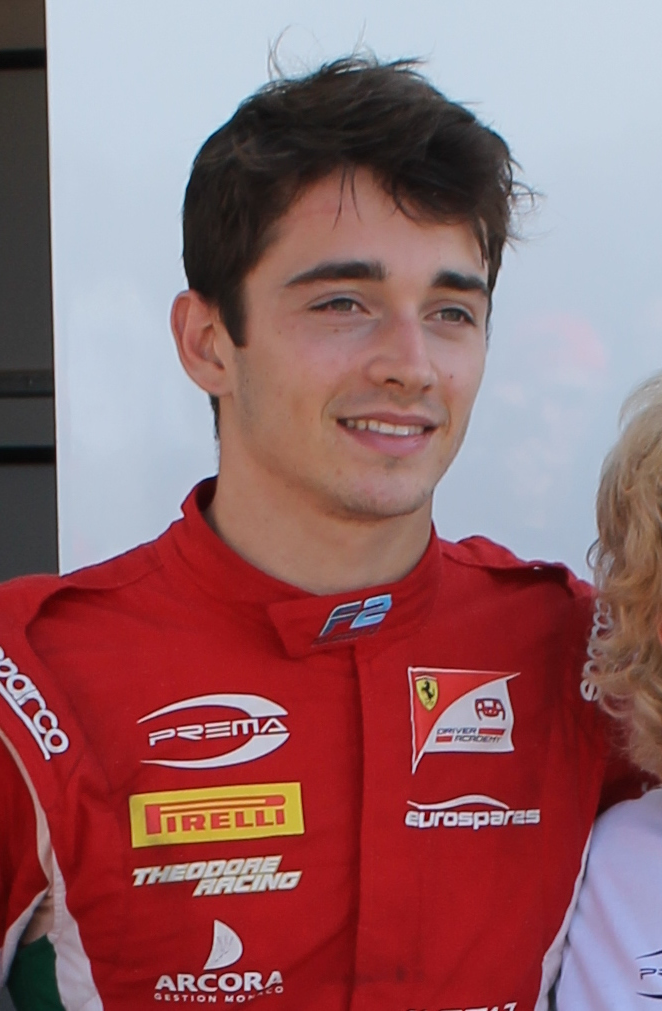
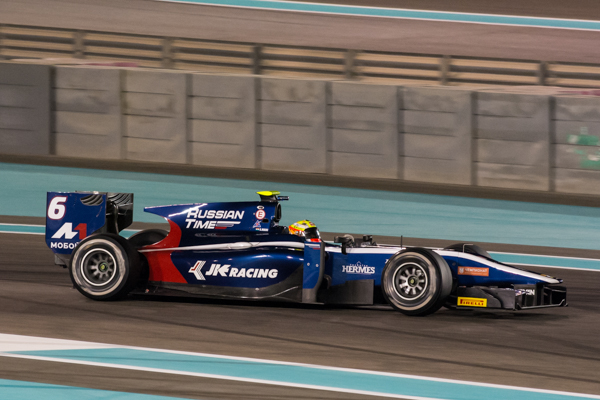
Charles Leclerc (left) and Russian Time (right) won the inaugural Drivers' and Teams' championships, respectively.

The 2017 FIA Formula 2 Championship was the fifty-first season of the second-tier of Formula One feeder championship and also the first season under the moniker of FIA Formula 2 Championship, a motor racing championship run in support of the 2017 FIA Formula One World Championship. The championship is sanctioned by the Fédération Internationale de l'Automobile (FIA) and is open to teams and drivers competing in cars complying with Formula 2 regulations.

2017 was the final season that the Dallara GP2/11 chassis package—which débuted in the 2011 GP2 Series—was used in competition. It was also the final season that the Mecachrome 4.0 litre V8 naturally-aspirated engine package that débuted in the 2005 GP2 Series was used, as a brand new chassis and engine package was introduced for the 2018 season.

The season was dominated by Charles Leclerc, who secured the drivers' championship with three races to go. Second place went to Artem Markelov with Oliver Rowland finishing third. The teams' championship was decided in the final race, with Russian Time winning by fifteen points over Prema Racing and DAMS in third, a further eleven points behind.

Champion Charles Leclerc took 7 wins, while runner-up Artem Markelov took 5 victories, Oliver Rowland took 2 wins, Luca Ghiotto, who finished fourth in the championship, took 1 win, Nobuharu Matsushita took 2 victories, Norman Nato, Nicholas Latifi, Antonio Fuoco, Nyck de Vries and Sérgio Sette Câmara each took one race win.

== Teams and drivers ==
All FIA Formula 2 drivers competed in a Dallara GP2/11 chassis, using a Mecachrome GP2 V8 engine and Pirelli tyres.

Team	No.	Drivers	Rounds
(Italy) Prema Racing	1	(Monaco) Charles Leclerc	All
(Italy) Prema Racing	2	(Italy) Antonio Fuoco	All
(Spain) Racing Engineering	3	(Switzerland) Louis Delétraz	1–7
(Spain) Racing Engineering	3	(Netherlands) Nyck de Vries	8–11
(Spain) Racing Engineering	4	(Sweden) Gustav Malja	All
(Russia) Russian Time	5	(Italy) Luca Ghiotto	All
(Russia) Russian Time	6	(Russia) Artem Markelov	All
(France) ART Grand Prix	7	(Japan) Nobuharu Matsushita	All
(France) ART Grand Prix	8	(Thailand) Alexander Albon	1–3, 5–11
(France) ART Grand Prix	8	(Russia) Sergey Sirotkin	4
(France) DAMS	9	(United Kingdom) Oliver Rowland	All
(France) DAMS	10	(Canada) Nicholas Latifi	All
(Spain) Campos Racing	11	(Switzerland) Ralph Boschung	1–10
(Spain) Campos Racing	11	(United Kingdom) Lando Norris	11
(Spain) Campos Racing	12	(Monaco) Stefano Coletti	1
(Spain) Campos Racing	12	(Spain) Roberto Merhi	2
(Spain) Campos Racing	12	(Romania) Robert Vișoiu	3–9
(Spain) Campos Racing	12	(Japan) Álex Palou (Note: Palou is a Spanish driver who competed under a Japanese racing licence.)	10–11
(Netherlands) MP Motorsport	14	(Brazil) Sérgio Sette Câmara	All
(Netherlands) MP Motorsport	15	(United Kingdom) Jordan King	All
(Italy) Trident	16	(Malaysia) Nabil Jeffri	All
(Italy) Trident	17	(Spain) Sergio Canamasas	1–4
(Italy) Trident	17	(Italy) Raffaele Marciello	5
(Italy) Trident	17	(United Kingdom) Callum Ilott	6
(Italy) Trident	17	(United States) Santino Ferrucci	7–11
(Italy) Rapax	18	(Netherlands) Nyck de Vries	1–7
(Italy) Rapax	18	(Switzerland) Louis Delétraz	8–11
(Italy) Rapax	19	(Venezuela) Johnny Cecotto Jr. (Note: Cecotto competed under a state Venezuelan racing licence.)	1–4
(Italy) Rapax	19	(Spain) Sergio Canamasas	5–7
(Italy) Rapax	19	(Spain) Roberto Merhi	8–9, 11
(Italy) Rapax	19	(Austria) René Binder	10
(United Kingdom) Pertamina Arden	20	(France) Norman Nato	All
(United Kingdom) Pertamina Arden	21	(Indonesia) Sean Gelael	All

=== Team changes ===
After six seasons in the series, Carlin withdrew to concentrate on their Indy Lights programme. German entry Hilmer Motorsport were due to return to the series while it was still known as GP2, however, this never came to fruition.

=== Driver changes ===
Prema Racing drivers Antonio Giovinazzi and reigning GP2 champion Pierre Gasly both left the series; Giovinazzi began a role in Formula One as Ferrari reserve driver and Gasly moved to Super Formula. They were replaced by Ferrari Driver Academy members Charles Leclerc and Antonio Fuoco, who finished first and third respectively in the 2016 GP3 Series.

Racing Engineering drivers Norman Nato and Jordan King both switched teams. Their seats were taken by Renault Sport Academy member and Formula V8 3.5 Series runner-up Louis Delétraz — who had made an appearance for Carlin at the final GP2 round the previous year — and Gustav Malja, who moved across from Rapax.

Russian Time driver Raffaele Marciello left the series to begin a career in GT racing. He was replaced by Luca Ghiotto, who moved from Trident to join the retained Artem Markelov.

ART Grand Prix continued with Nobuharu Matsushita and hired GP3 runner-up Alex Albon to replace Sergey Sirotkin, who left the series to begin a Formula One test and reserve driver role with Renault.

DAMS driver Alex Lynn left the championship to serve as a Formula E reserve driver with DS Virgin Racing. He was replaced by Renault Sport Academy driver Oliver Rowland, who switched from MP Motorsport to join Nicholas Latifi at the team.

Campos Racing drivers Sean Gelael and Mitch Evans both departed the team, with Evans leaving the series after four years to join Jaguar Racing in Formula E. Ralph Boschung, who finished 11th in the previous two GP3 seasons, graduated to Formula 2 with Campos. Stefano Coletti, who previously raced in GP2 between 2009 and 2014 and had since raced in IndyCar and the European Le Mans Series, joined Boschung for the opening round.

MP Motorsport changed both drivers, with Oliver Rowland switching teams and Daniël de Jong leaving the category for sportscar racing. Jordan King joined the team from Racing Engineering and was partnered by Sérgio Sette Câmara, who graduated to Formula 2 having placed 11th in the 2016 FIA Formula 3 European Championship.

Trident drivers Luca Ghiotto and Philo Paz Armand departed the team, with Armand leaving racing entirely. The team signed Nabil Jeffri and Sergio Canamasas, who moved across from the Arden and Carlin teams respectively.

Rapax retained Johnny Cecotto Jr., who raced with the team in the final two rounds of the previous season in place of Arthur Pic. He was joined by GP3 sixth-placed finisher and McLaren junior driver Nyck de Vries in place of the departing Gustav Malja.

Pertamina Arden did not retain Emil Bernstorff, who debuted with the team in the final round of 2016. Norman Nato and Sean Gelael joined the team from Racing Engineering and Campos respectively, in place of Bernstorff and Nabil Jeffri.

Mid-season changes

Campos Racing initially stated that Stefano Coletti would continue to race with them for the second round at the Circuit de Barcelona-Catalunya, but he was replaced with former Formula One driver Roberto Merhi shortly before the event. Merhi was then replaced by former Rapax driver Robert Vișoiu before the third round at the Circuit de Monaco.

A broken collarbone from a bicycle accident forced ART Grand Prix driver Alex Albon to miss the fourth round at the Baku City Circuit. Sergey Sirotkin returned to the team to deputise.

Trident driver Sergio Canamasas switched to Rapax for the fifth round at the Red Bull Ring in place of Johnny Cecotto Jr., who left the series. His Trident seat was filled firstly by series returnee Raffaele Marciello, then by FIA Formula 3 European Championship title contender Callum Ilott at Silverstone Circuit, and finally by GP3 racer and Haas Formula One test driver Santino Ferrucci for the remainder of the season.

The eighth round at Circuit de Spa-Francorchamps saw Rapax driver Nyck de Vries and Racing Engineering's Louis Delétraz swap seats for the rest of the season. Sergio Canamasas left the series before the round and his Rapax seat was taken by Roberto Merhi, who returned to the championship. Canamasas later revealed he had left motorsport entirely due to an incident involving security at the Hungaroring round during which he "almost lost [his] father".

Robert Vișoiu left the series for "personal reasons" before the tenth round at Circuito de Jerez. His seat at Campos Racing was filled by Japanese Formula 3 driver Álex Palou for the final two rounds. World Series Formula V8 3.5 driver René Binder, who had raced in GP2 between 2012 and 2016, joined Rapax in place of Roberto Merhi for the Jerez round.

Merhi returned to the Rapax seat for the final round at Yas Marina Circuit. Reigning FIA Formula 3 European champion Lando Norris made his debut in the category at Yas Marina, taking the Campos Racing seat vacated by Ralph Boschung.

== Calendar ==
The following eleven rounds took place as part of the 2017 championship:

Round	Circuit/Location	Date	Supporting
1	Bahrain International Circuit, Sakhir	15–16 April	Bahrain Grand Prix
2	(Spain) Circuit de Barcelona-Catalunya, Montmeló	13–14 May	Spanish Grand Prix
3	Circuit de Monaco, Monaco	26–27 May	Monaco Grand Prix
4	(Azerbaijan) Baku City Circuit, Baku	24–25 June	Azerbaijan Grand Prix
5	(Austria) Red Bull Ring, Spielberg	8–9 July	Austrian Grand Prix
6	(United Kingdom) Silverstone Circuit, Silverstone	15–16 July	British Grand Prix
7	(Hungary) Hungaroring, Mogyoród	29–30 July	Hungarian Grand Prix
8	(Belgium) Circuit de Spa-Francorchamps, Stavelot	26–27 August	Belgian Grand Prix
9	(Italy) Autodromo Nazionale Monza, Monza	2–3 September	Italian Grand Prix
10	(Spain) Circuito de Jerez, Jerez de la Frontera	7–8 October	stand-alone event
11	(United Arab Emirates) Yas Marina Circuit, Abu Dhabi	25–26 November	Abu Dhabi Grand Prix

=== Calendar changes ===
The series returned to the Bahrain International Circuit in support of the Bahrain Grand Prix, while the rounds at the Hockenheimring and the Sepang International Circuit were discontinued. The series made its début at the Circuito de Jerez, with a stand-alone event that was run as the penultimate round of the championship.

== Changes ==
The series was originally intended to be run as the GP2 Series before it was rebranded as the FIA Formula 2 Championship in March 2017. The decision to rebrand the series brings it in line with the FIA Global Pathway, which aims to create a linear path of feeder series from domestic Formula 4 to the top tier of open-wheel racing, Formula One. Despite the name change, it will retain the GP2 regulations as originally scheduled, making the 2017 season the thirteenth to use GP2 regulations. It will be the first time that a series has been run under the name of Formula 2 since Jonathan Palmer's unrelated series collapsed in 2012.

== Results ==
=== Season summary ===
Round		Circuit	Pole position	Fastest lap	Winning driver	Winning team	Report
1	F	Bahrain International Circuit	(Monaco) Charles Leclerc	(Monaco) Stefano Coletti (Note: Stefano Coletti set the fastest lap, but finished outside the top 10, so he was ineligible to score points for the fastest lap. Artem Markelov was awarded the points instead as he set fastest lap of those finishing in the top 10.)	(Russia) Artem Markelov	(Russia) Russian Time	Report
1	S	Bahrain International Circuit		(Brazil) Sérgio Sette Câmara (Note: Sérgio Sette Câmara set the fastest lap, but finished outside the top 10, so he was ineligible to score points for the fastest lap. Charles Leclerc was awarded the points instead as he set fastest lap of those finishing in the top 10.)	(Monaco) Charles Leclerc	(Italy) Prema Racing	Report
2	F	(Spain) Circuit de Barcelona-Catalunya	(Monaco) Charles Leclerc	(Russia) Artem Markelov	(Monaco) Charles Leclerc	(Italy) Prema Racing	Report
2	S	(Spain) Circuit de Barcelona-Catalunya		(Switzerland) Ralph Boschung (Note: Ralph Boschung set the fastest lap, but finished outside the top 10, so he was ineligible to score points for the fastest lap. Nicholas Latifi was awarded the points instead as he set fastest lap of those finishing in the top 10.)	(Japan) Nobuharu Matsushita	(France) ART Grand Prix	Report
3	F	Circuit de Monaco	(Monaco) Charles Leclerc	(Monaco) Charles Leclerc (Note: Charles Leclerc set the fastest lap, but finished outside the top 10, so he was ineligible to score points for the fastest lap. Oliver Rowland was awarded the points instead as he set fastest lap of those finishing in the top 10.)	(United Kingdom) Oliver Rowland	(France) DAMS	Report
3	S	Circuit de Monaco		(Russia) Artem Markelov	(Netherlands) Nyck de Vries	(Italy) Rapax	Report
4	F	(Azerbaijan) Baku City Circuit	(Monaco) Charles Leclerc	(Monaco) Charles Leclerc	(Monaco) Charles Leclerc	(Italy) Prema Racing	Report
4	S	(Azerbaijan) Baku City Circuit		(Monaco) Charles Leclerc	(France) Norman Nato (Note: Charles Leclerc won the race, but later received a ten-second time penalty for not slowing down in the yellow flag area.)	(United Kingdom) Pertamina Arden	Report
5	F	(Austria) Red Bull Ring	(Monaco) Charles Leclerc	(Japan) Nobuharu Matsushita	(Monaco) Charles Leclerc	(Italy) Prema Racing	Report
5	S	(Austria) Red Bull Ring		(Russia) Artem Markelov	(Russia) Artem Markelov	(Russia) Russian Time	Report
6	F	(United Kingdom) Silverstone Circuit	(Monaco) Charles Leclerc	(Japan) Nobuharu Matsushita	(Monaco) Charles Leclerc	(Italy) Prema Racing	Report
6	S	(United Kingdom) Silverstone Circuit		(Monaco) Charles Leclerc	(Canada) Nicholas Latifi	(France) DAMS	Report
7	F	(Hungary) Hungaroring	(United Kingdom) Oliver Rowland (Note: Charles Leclerc initially qualified on pole, but was later disqualified due to a technical breach.)	(Canada) Nicholas Latifi	(United Kingdom) Oliver Rowland	(France) DAMS	Report
7	S	(Hungary) Hungaroring		(Italy) Antonio Fuoco (Note: Antonio Fuoco set the fastest lap, but finished outside the top 10, so he was ineligible to score points for the fastest lap. Artem Markelov was awarded the points instead as he set fastest lap of those finishing in the top 10.)	(Japan) Nobuharu Matsushita	(France) ART Grand Prix	Report
8	F	(Belgium) Circuit de Spa-Francorchamps	(Monaco) Charles Leclerc	(Russia) Artem Markelov	(Russia) Artem Markelov (Note: Charles Leclerc won the race, but was later disqualified due to a technical infringement.)	(Russia) Russian Time	Report
8	S	(Belgium) Circuit de Spa-Francorchamps		(United Kingdom) Jordan King (Note: Jordan King set the fastest lap, but finished outside the top 10, so he was ineligible to score points for the fastest lap. Nyck de Vries was awarded the points instead as he set fastest lap of those finishing in the top 10.)	(Brazil) Sérgio Sette Câmara	(Netherlands) MP Motorsport	Report
9	F	(Italy) Autodromo Nazionale Monza	(Japan) Nobuharu Matsushita	(Canada) Nicholas Latifi (Note: Luca Ghiotto won the race and set the fastest lap, but was later issued a time penalty and stripped of the fastest lap after he was found to have exceeded track limits and gained an advantage.)	(Italy) Antonio Fuoco	(Italy) Prema Racing	Report
9	S	(Italy) Autodromo Nazionale Monza		(United Kingdom) Jordan King (Note: Jordan King set the fastest lap, but finished outside the top 10, so he was ineligible to score points for the fastest lap. Antonio Fuoco was awarded the points instead as he set fastest lap of those finishing in the top 10.)	(Italy) Luca Ghiotto	(Russia) Russian Time	Report
10	F	(Spain) Circuito de Jerez	(Monaco) Charles Leclerc	(United Kingdom) Oliver Rowland	(Monaco) Charles Leclerc	(Italy) Prema Racing	Report
10	S	(Spain) Circuito de Jerez		(Austria) René Binder (Note: René Binder set the fastest lap, but finished outside the top 10, so he was ineligible to score points for the fastest lap. Nyck de Vries was awarded the points instead as he set fastest lap of those finishing in the top 10.)	(Russia) Artem Markelov	(Russia) Russian Time	Report
11	F	(United Arab Emirates) Yas Marina Circuit	(Russia) Artem Markelov	(Thailand) Alexander Albon	(Russia) Artem Markelov (Note: Oliver Rowland won the race, but was later disqualified due to a technical infringement.)	(Russia) Russian Time	Report
11	S	(United Arab Emirates) Yas Marina Circuit		(United Kingdom) Jordan King (Note: Jordan King set the fastest lap, but finished outside the top 10, so he was ineligible to score points for the fastest lap. Nicholas Latifi was awarded the points instead as he set fastest lap of those finishing in the top 10.)	(Monaco) Charles Leclerc	(Italy) Prema Racing	Report

== Championship standings ==
=== Scoring system ===
Points were awarded to the top 10 classified finishers in the Feature race, and to the top 8 classified finishers in the Sprint race. The pole-sitter in the feature race also received four points, and two points were given to the driver who set the fastest lap inside the top ten in both the feature and sprint races. No extra points were awarded to the pole-sitter in the sprint race.

Feature race points

Position	**1st**	**2nd**	**3rd**	**4th**	**5th**	**6th**	**7th**	**8th**	**9th**	**10th**	**Pole**	**FL**
Points	25	18	15	12	10	8	6	4	2	1	4	2

Sprint race points

Points were awarded to the top 8 classified finishers.

Position	**1st**	**2nd**	**3rd**	**4th**	**5th**	**6th**	**7th**	**8th**	**FL**
Points	15	12	10	8	6	4	2	1	2

=== Drivers' championship ===
Pos.	Driver	BHR (Bahrain)		CAT (Spain)		MON (Monaco)		BAK (Azerbaijan)		RBR (Austria)		SIL (United Kingdom)		HUN (Hungary)		SPA (Belgium)		MNZ (Italy)		JER (Spain)		YMC (United Arab Emirates)		Points
Pos.	Driver	FR	SR	FR	SR	FR	SR	FR	SR	FR	SR	FR	SR	FR	SR	FR	SR	FR	SR	FR	SR	FR	SR	Points
1	(Monaco) Charles Leclerc	**3**	1	**1**	4	**Ret**	18†	**1**	2	**1**	Ret	**1**	5	4	4	**DSQ**	5	17	9	**1**	7	2	1	282
2	(Russia) Artem Markelov	1	8	8	9	2	5	4	5	8	1	4	3	17†	9	1	Ret	9	15	5	1	**1**	6	210
3	(United Kingdom) Oliver Rowland	5	3	3	2	1	9	7	Ret	4	3	3	17	**1**	2	DSQ	8	Ret	11	2	3	DSQ	7	191
4	(Italy) Luca Ghiotto	7	2	2	7	5	4	16	7	14	4	6	2	6	8	2	3	4	1	7	4	3	5	185
5	(Canada) Nicholas Latifi	11	4	6	3	Ret	13	3	3	2	8	8	1	2	6	DNS	9	3	16	4	2	5	3	178
6	(Japan) Nobuharu Matsushita	8	14	4	1	3	7	12	6	6	14	10	8	5	1	16	Ret	**2**	7	18	11	6	4	131
7	(Netherlands) Nyck de Vries	10	6	10	Ret	7	1	2	Ret	13	16†	DNS	7	3	3	5	2	18	12	13	6	4	9	114
8	(Italy) Antonio Fuoco	9	10	13	Ret	11	10	Ret	12	3	5	16	12	Ret	17	3	7	1	3	3	5	DSQ	11	98
9	(France) Norman Nato	2	Ret	16	13	Ret	Ret	5	1	Ret	7	2	6	7	5	8	4	13	10	11	10	13	18†	91
10	(Thailand) Alexander Albon	6	7	5	8	4	6			5	2	18	10	8	7	12	18	14	8	12	9	7	2	86
11	(United Kingdom) Jordan King	4	5	9	5	9	8	6	DSQ	9	6	7	Ret	15	11	Ret	14	10	20	6	Ret	8	Ret	62
12	(Brazil) Sérgio Sette Câmara	13	18	14	15	Ret	14	13	9	16	10	13	15	16	13	6	1	6	2	10	14	9	8	47
13	(Sweden) Gustav Malja	18	13	7	6	6	3	11	13	12	15	14	9	13	NC	4	11	8	18	14	18	11	17	44
14	(Spain) Sergio Canamasas	14	11	Ret	11	10	17	9	15	15	9	5	4	Ret	Ret									21
15	(Indonesia) Sean Gelael	17	17	15	16	13	12	14	10	10	11	9	16	14	10	15	17	5	6	16	16	15	14	17
16	(Venezuela) Johnny Cecotto Jr.	15	9	17	10	8	2	Ret	14															16
17	(Switzerland) Louis Delétraz	20	12	11	14	15	16	Ret	16	17	13	12	13	10	12	14	12	7	4	17	12	10	Ret	16
18	(Spain) Roberto Merhi			19†	12											7	6	11	5			16	10	16
19	(Switzerland) Ralph Boschung	12	Ret	12	17	12	Ret	8	8	7	Ret	11	Ret	11	16	13	13	15	13	Ret	19†			11
20	(Russia) Sergey Sirotkin							10	4															9
21	(Japan) Álex Palou																			8	8	12	12	5
22	(United States) Santino Ferrucci													9	14	9	10	Ret	14	Ret	13	14	15	4
23	(Malaysia) Nabil Jeffri	19	16	18	18	14	11	Ret	17	18	12	15	18	12	15	11	15	12	17	9	15	Ret	16	2
24	(Romania) Robert Vișoiu					Ret	15	15	11	11	17†	17	11	Ret	Ret	10	16	16	19					1
25	(United Kingdom) Lando Norris																					Ret	13	0
26	(United Kingdom) Callum Ilott											19	14											0
27	(Monaco) Stefano Coletti	16	15																					0
28	(Austria) René Binder																			15	17			0
29	(Italy) Raffaele Marciello									19	Ret													0
Pos.	Driver	FR	SR	FR	SR	FR	SR	FR	SR	FR	SR	FR	SR	FR	SR	FR	SR	FR	SR	FR	SR	FR	SR	Points
Pos.	Driver	BHR (Bahrain)		CAT (Spain)		MON (Monaco)		BAK (Azerbaijan)		RBR (Austria)		SIL (United Kingdom)		HUN (Hungary)		SPA (Belgium)		MNZ (Italy)		JER (Spain)		YMC (United Arab Emirates)		Points

Key
Colour	Result
Gold	Winner
Silver	2nd place
Bronze	3rd place
Green	Other points position
Blue	Other classified position
Blue	Not classified, finished (NC)
Purple	Not classified, retired (Ret)
Red	Did not qualify (DNQ)
Red	Did not pre-qualify (DNPQ)
Black	Disqualified (DSQ)
White	Did not start (DNS)
White	Race cancelled (C)
Blank	Did not practice (DNP)
Blank	Excluded (EX)
Blank	Did not arrive (DNA)
Blank	Withdrawn (WD)
Text formatting	Meaning
**Bold**	Pole position point(s)
Italics	Fastest lap point(s)

Notes:

- † — Drivers did not finish the race, but were classified as they completed over 90% of the race distance.

=== Teams' championship ===
Pos.	Team	No.	BHR (Bahrain)		CAT (Spain)		MON (Monaco)		BAK (Azerbaijan)		RBR (Austria)		SIL (United Kingdom)		HUN (Hungary)		SPA (Belgium)		MNZ (Italy)		JER (Spain)		YMC (United Arab Emirates)		Points
Pos.	Team	No.	FR	SR	FR	SR	FR	SR	FR	SR	FR	SR	FR	SR	FR	SR	FR	SR	FR	SR	FR	SR	FR	SR	Points
1	(Russia) Russian Time	5	7	2	2	7	5	4	16	7	14	4	6	2	6	8	2	3	4	1	7	4	3	5	395
1	(Russia) Russian Time	6	1	8	8	9	2	5	4	5	8	1	4	3	17	9	1	Ret	9	15	5	1	**1**	6	395
2	(Italy) Prema Racing	1	**3**	1	**1**	4	**Ret**	18†	**1**	2	**1**	Ret	**1**	5	4	4	**DSQ**	5	17	9	**1**	7	2	1	380
2	(Italy) Prema Racing	2	9	10	13	Ret	11	10	Ret	12	3	5	16	12	Ret	17	3	7	1	3	3	5	DSQ	11	380
3	(France) DAMS	9	5	3	3	2	1	9	7	Ret	4	3	3	17	**1**	2	DSQ	8	Ret	11	2	3	DSQ	7	369
3	(France) DAMS	10	11	4	6	3	Ret	13	3	3	2	8	8	1	2	6	Ret	9	3	16	4	2	5	3	369
4	(France) ART Grand Prix	7	8	14	4	1	3	7	12	6	6	14	10	8	5	1	16	Ret	**2**	7	18	11	6	4	222
4	(France) ART Grand Prix	8	6	7	5	8	4	6	10	4	5	2	18	10	8	7	12	18	13	8	12	9	7	2	222
5	(Italy) Rapax	18	10	6	10	Ret	7	1	2	Ret	13	16†	DNS	7	3	3	14	12	7	4	17	12	10	Ret	137
5	(Italy) Rapax	19	15	9	17	10	8	2	Ret	14	15	9	5	4	Ret	Ret	7	6	11	5	15	17	16	10	137
6	(Netherlands) MP Motorsport	14	13	18	14	15	Ret	14	13	9	16	10	13	15	16	13	6	1	6	2	10	14	9	8	109
6	(Netherlands) MP Motorsport	15	4	5	9	5	9	8	6	DSQ	9	6	7	Ret	15	11	Ret	14	10	20	6	Ret	8	Ret	109
7	(United Kingdom) Pertamina Arden	20	2	Ret	16	13	Ret	Ret	5	1	Ret	7	2	6	7	5	8	4	13	10	11	10	13	18†	108
7	(United Kingdom) Pertamina Arden	21	17	17	15	16	13	12	14	10	10	11	9	16	14	10	15	17	5	6	16	17	15	14	108
8	(Spain) Racing Engineering	3	20	12	11	14	15	16	Ret	16	17	13	12	13	10	12	5	2	18	12	13	6	4	9	87
8	(Spain) Racing Engineering	4	18	13	7	6	6	3	11	13	12	15	14	9	13	NC	4	11	8	18	14	18	11	17	87
9	(Spain) Campos Racing	11	12	Ret	12	17	12	Ret	8	8	7	Ret	11	Ret	11	16	13	13	15	13	Ret	19†	Ret	13	17
9	(Spain) Campos Racing	12	16	15	19†	12	Ret	15	15	11	11	17†	17	11	Ret	Ret	10	16	16	19	8	8	12	12	17
10	(Italy) Trident	16	19	16	18	18	14	11	Ret	17	18	12	15	18	12	15	11	15	12	17	9	15	Ret	16	9
10	(Italy) Trident	17	14	11	Ret	11	10	17	9	15	19	Ret	19	14	9	14	9	10	Ret	14	Ret	13	14	15	9
Pos.	Team	No.	FR	SR	FR	SR	FR	SR	FR	SR	FR	SR	FR	SR	FR	SR	FR	SR	FR	SR	FR	SR	FR	SR	Points
Pos.	Team	No.	BHR (Bahrain)		CAT (Spain)		MON (Monaco)		BAK (Azerbaijan)		RBR (Austria)		SIL (United Kingdom)		HUN (Hungary)		SPA (Belgium)		MNZ (Italy)		JER (Spain)		YMC (United Arab Emirates)		Points

Key
Colour	Result
Gold	Winner
Silver	2nd place
Bronze	3rd place
Green	Other points position
Blue	Other classified position
Blue	Not classified, finished (NC)
Purple	Not classified, retired (Ret)
Red	Did not qualify (DNQ)
Red	Did not pre-qualify (DNPQ)
Black	Disqualified (DSQ)
White	Did not start (DNS)
White	Race cancelled (C)
Blank	Did not practice (DNP)
Blank	Excluded (EX)
Blank	Did not arrive (DNA)
Blank	Withdrawn (WD)
Text formatting	Meaning
**Bold**	Pole position point(s)
Italics	Fastest lap point(s)

Notes:

- † — Drivers did not finish the race, but were classified as they completed over 90% of the race distance.
