= Oliver Rowland =

British racing driver (born 1992)

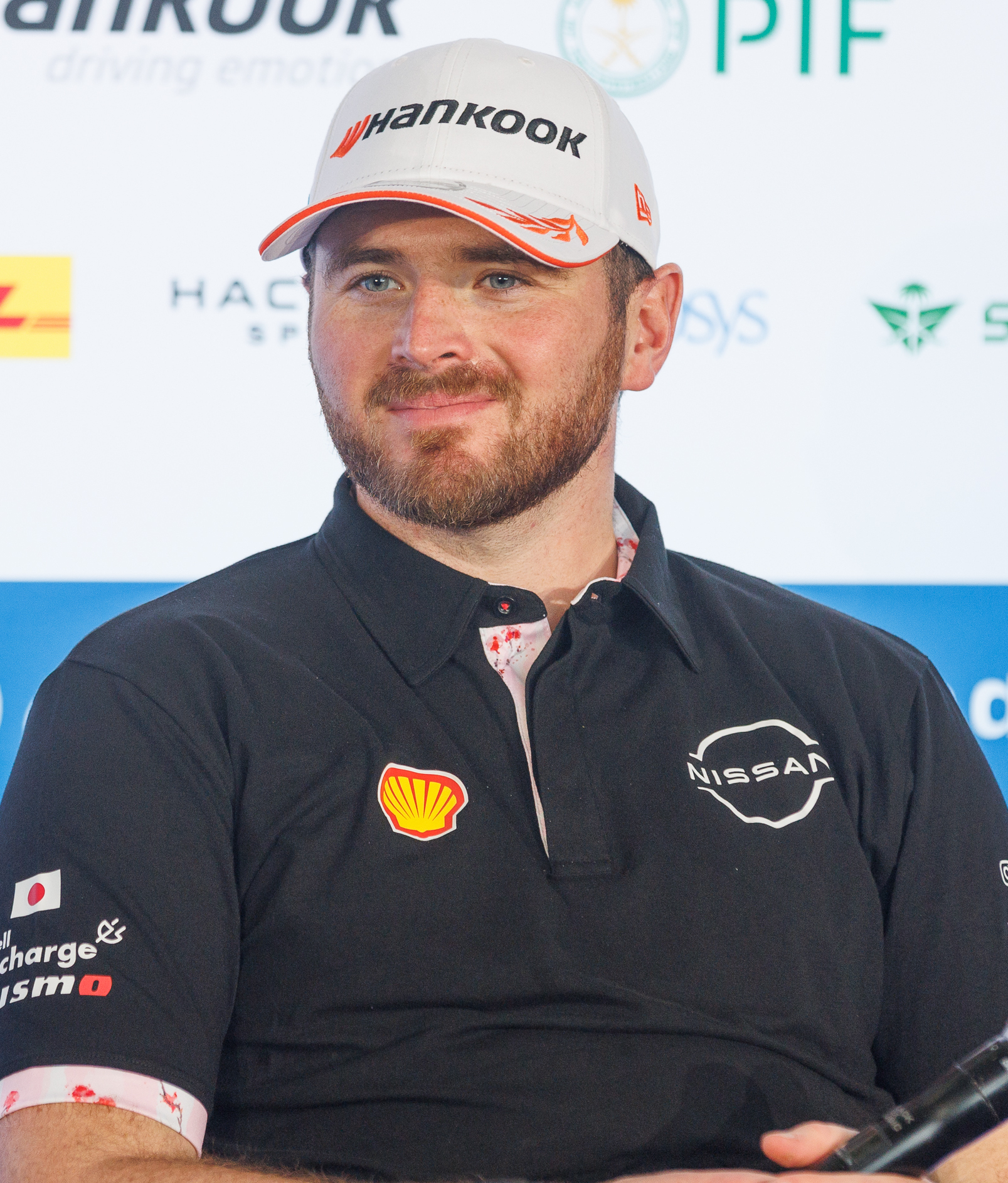
- Rowland at the 2024 Berlin ePrix
- Nationality: (United Kingdom) British
- Born: Oliver Eric Rowland; 10 August 1992 (age 34) Barnsley, South Yorkshire, England

Formula E career
- Debut season: 2015–16
- Current team: Nissan
- Categorisation: FIA Platinum
- Car number: 23; 1 (2025–26)
- Former teams: Nissan e.dams, Mahindra
- Starts: 103
- Championships: 1 (2024–25)
- Wins: 7
- Podiums: 25
- Poles: 10
- Fastest laps: 5
- Finished last season: 4th (137 pts)

Previous series
- 2017 2015–16 2014–15 2012–13 2013 2011 2010–11: FIA Formula 2 Championship; GP2 Series; Formula Renault 3.5 Series; Eurocup Formula Renault 2.0; Formula Renault 2.0 NEC; Formula Renault UK; FR2.0 UK Winter/Finals Series

Championship titles
- 2024-25 2015 2011: Formula E Formula Renault 3.5 Series; FR2.0 UK Finals Series

Awards
- 2011 2011: McLaren Autosport Award; BRDC SuperStar

Oliver Eric Rowland (/roʊlənd/; born 10 August 1992) is a British racing driver who competes in Formula E for Nissan. Rowland won the 2024–25 Formula E World Championship with Nissan.

Rowland has previously competed for Manor Motorsport in the 2018 WEC season, and he was also previously the young driver of Williams F1 Team during the 2018 Formula 1 season. Rowland is also the manager and mentor of Racing Bulls driver Arvid Lindblad.

== Early career ==
=== Karting ===
Born in Barnsley, Rowland began karting at the age of seven, and spent a successful decade racing in the various classes around the United Kingdom. After finishing second in the Super 1 National Cadet Championship in 2002, Rowland won the championship for the next two years. In 2005, Rowland moved into the JICA class series, and again finished as a championship runner-up, finishing just two points behind Will Stevens.

=== Formula Renault ===
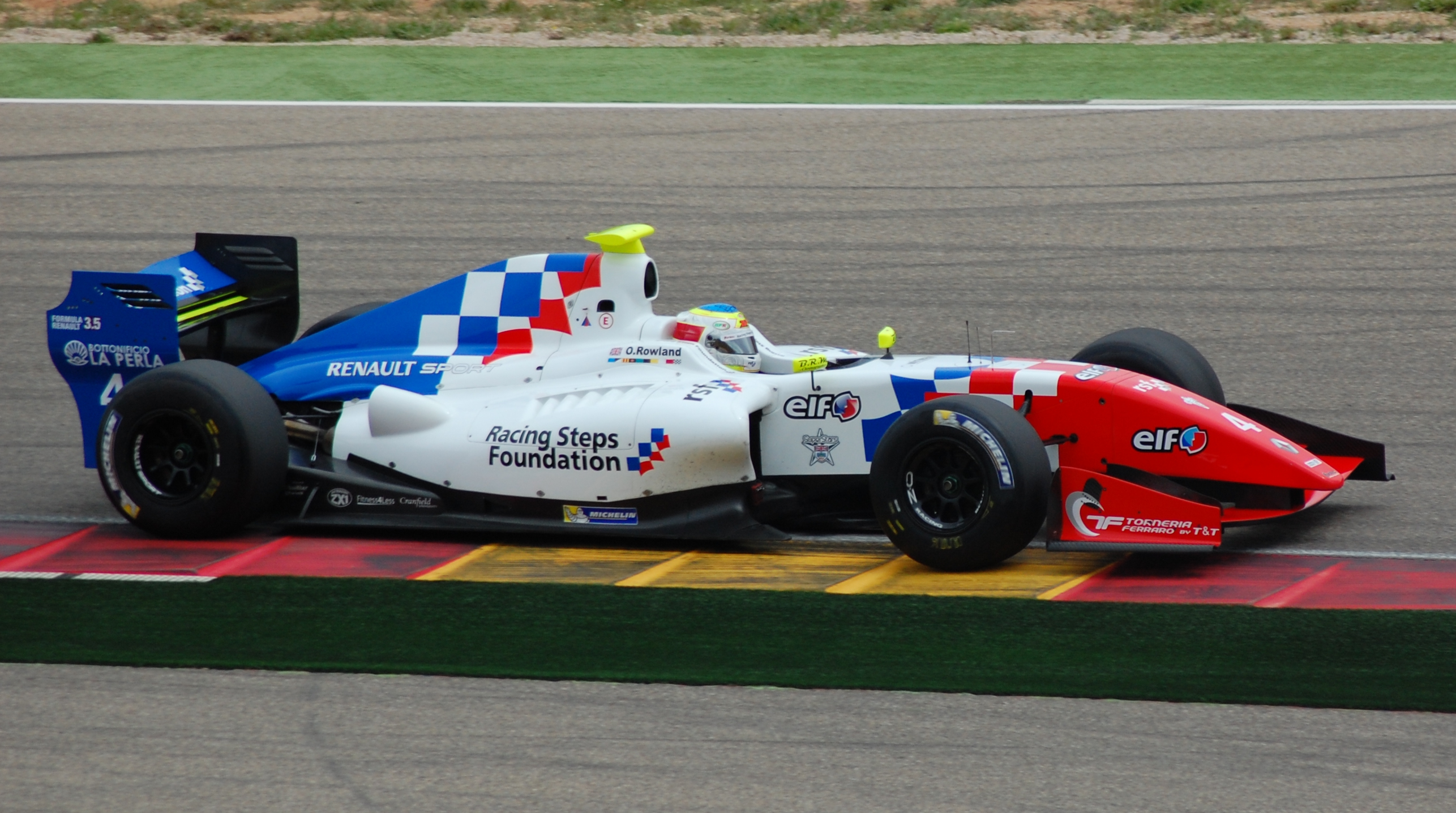
Oliver Rowland in Motorland Aragon 2014

Rowland left karting and stepped into Formula Renault, contesting the 2010 Formula Renault UK Winter Series with CRS Racing. He also received sponsorship from the Racing Steps Foundation, which funded his graduation into car racing. He took two twelfth-place finishes in his first car racing meeting at Snetterton, but eventually took his first win in the final race of the championship, at Pembrey.

Rowland moved to Fortec Motorsport for a full British championship campaign in 2011. Rowland took his first podium of the season, with third place at Donington Park, starting a run of four consecutive podiums – all third places – before a run of just two podium finishes in seven races. Rowland's last seven races were his best in the championship, taking four wins, four fastest laps, three pole positions and three second places. As a result of the strong run, Rowland became the winner of the Graduate Cup for young drivers, and finished as runner-up to teammate Alex Lynn in the main championship; the runner-up position was only sealed on the final lap of the final race, setting the quickest lap to score two bonus points in order to move him into a tie on points with Tio Ellinas, but with four wins to Ellinas' two, he placed ahead on countback. He also contested the Formula Renault UK Finals Series with the team, and comfortably won the championship with four race wins from six races. Rowland was nominated for the McLaren Autosport BRDC Award due to his performances in the main series. On 4 December 2011, after the evaluation tests held at Silverstone, Rowland was named as the winner of the award, taking the £100,000 cash prize and a Formula One test with McLaren.

Rowland was part of the McLaren young driver programme in 2007–2010

=== Formula Renault 3.5 ===
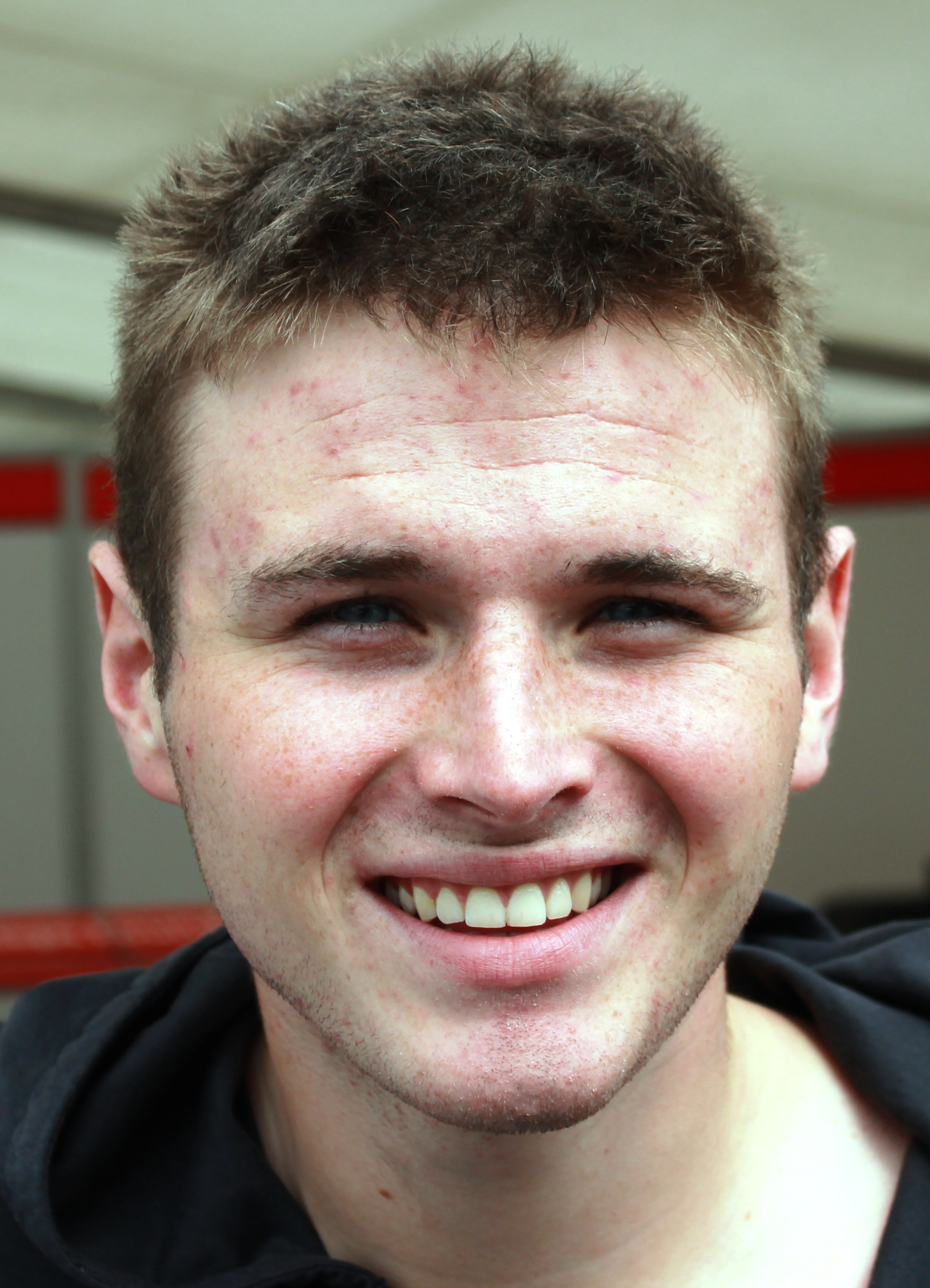
Rowland in 2012

Rowland signed a contract with Fortec Motorsport in July 2013 to race the Formula Renault 3.5 Series in the 2014 season. He finished fourth overall with two wins and seven podiums.

Rowland continued with Fortec Motorsport in the 2015 Formula Renault 3.5. He won eight races out of 17, becoming champion in the penultimate round.

Rowland won a test with Red Bull F1 at Silverstone for leading the series in 2015.

=== GP2 Series ===
In 2015, Rowland made his GP2 debut at Silverstone with MP Motorsport. He finished in the points in both races. He contested in three other rounds with MP and Status Grand Prix.

In February 2016, it was announced that Rowland would compete in the series full-time with MP, with whom he finished ninth.

For the 2017 season, Rowland switched to the DAMS squad, finishing third in the championship.

== Formula One ==
In February 2016, Rowland was confirmed as a member of Renault's young driver program, and in April 2017 Rowland was signed to the role of development driver to the Renault F1 Team.

In February 2018, Rowland was confirmed as Williams Martini Racing's official Junior Driver.

== Formula E ==
=== Mahindra Racing (2015) ===
Rowland competed in the 2015 Punta del Este ePrix with Mahindra Racing, in place of Nick Heidfeld, who had to undergo surgery for ligament damaged that he sustained during the Putrajaya ePrix. Rowland started the race 16th on the grid, and managed to finish in 13th place. He did not race again in Formula E for the rest of the season, but he served as a studio pundit for the television broadcast at some of the remaining races.

=== Nissan e.dams (2017–2021) ===
==== 2016–17 season ====
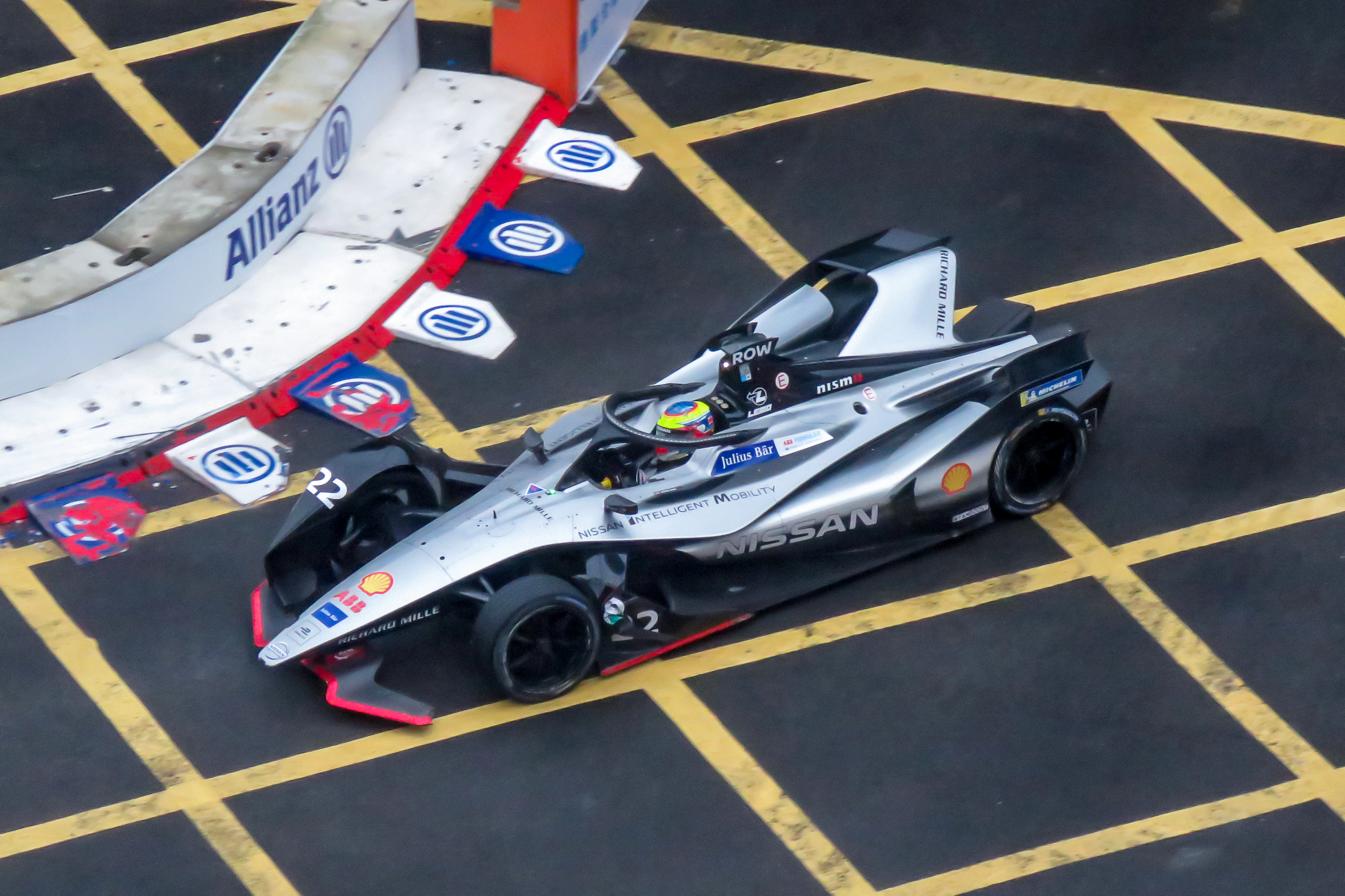
Rowland with Nissan

During the 2016-17 season, Rowland was hired by Renault e.Dams as a standby replacement for Sébastien Buemi for the 2017 Mexico City ePrix.

==== 2018–19 season ====
In November 2018, Rowland joined the championship full-time with the newly re-branded Nissan e.Dams following the departure of Alexander Albon to Toro Rosso. He claimed his first pole in Formula E in Sanya ePrix and finished in second place in the race, which was his first podium in Formula E.

==== 2019–20 season ====
Rowland took his first Formula E win at the 2020 Berlin ePrix, leading every lap after starting on pole position.

=== Return to Mahindra (2022–2023) ===
==== 2021–22 season ====
Rowland moved to Mahindra for the 2021–22 Formula E season. He took his first points finish for the team at the 2022 Diriyah ePrix. Rowland retired from the inaugural Jakarta ePrix after losing one of this tyres on the second lap.

==== 2022–23 season ====
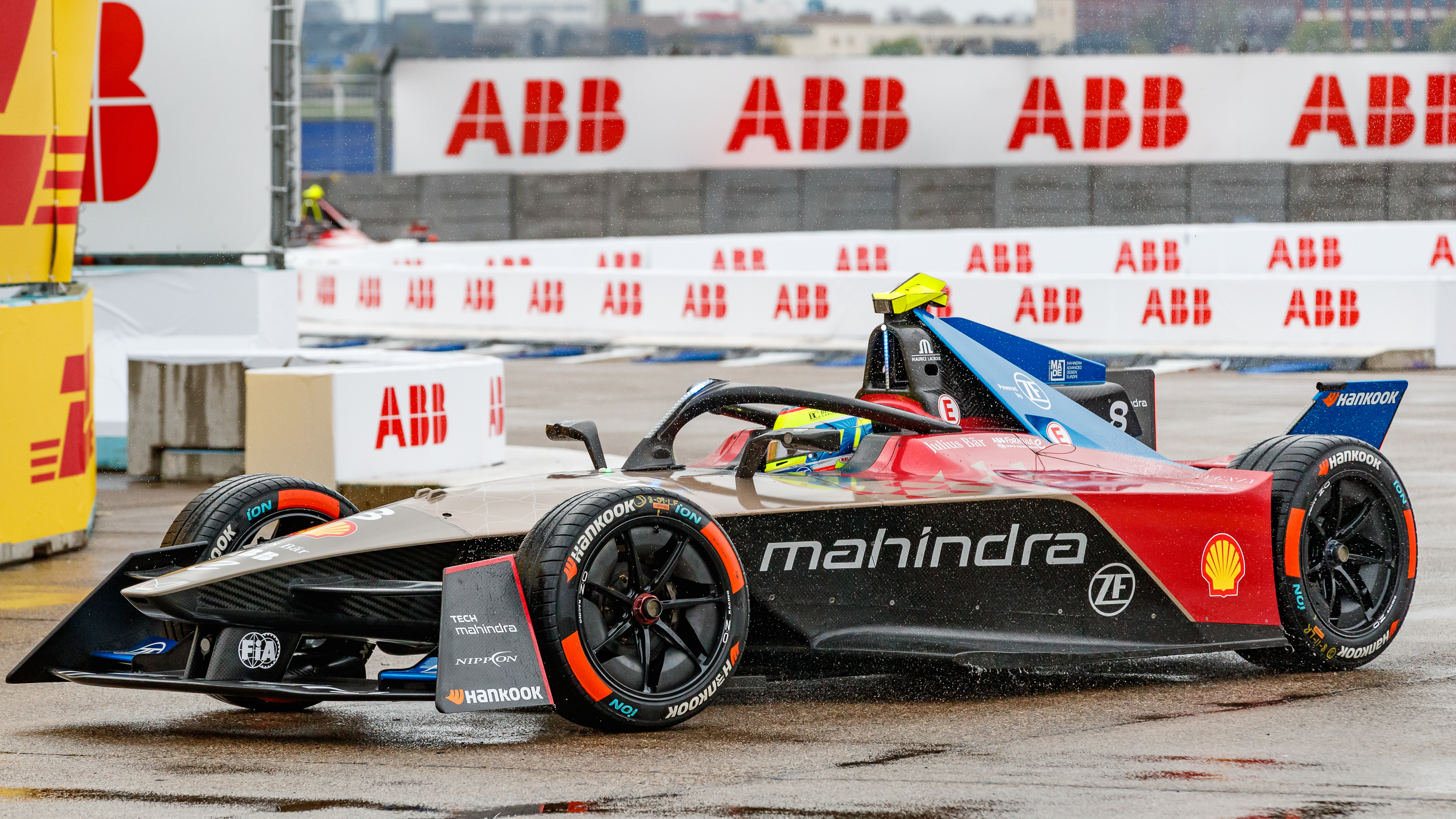
Rowland driving for Mahindra at the 2023 Berlin ePrix

Rowland remained with Mahindra for the 2022–23 season alongside Lucas di Grassi, who replaced Alexander Sims. Ahead of the Jakarta ePrix, Rowland was announced to have parted ways with Mahindra with immediate effect, and Roberto Merhi was drafted to replace him.

=== Return to Nissan (2024—) ===
==== 2023–24 season ====
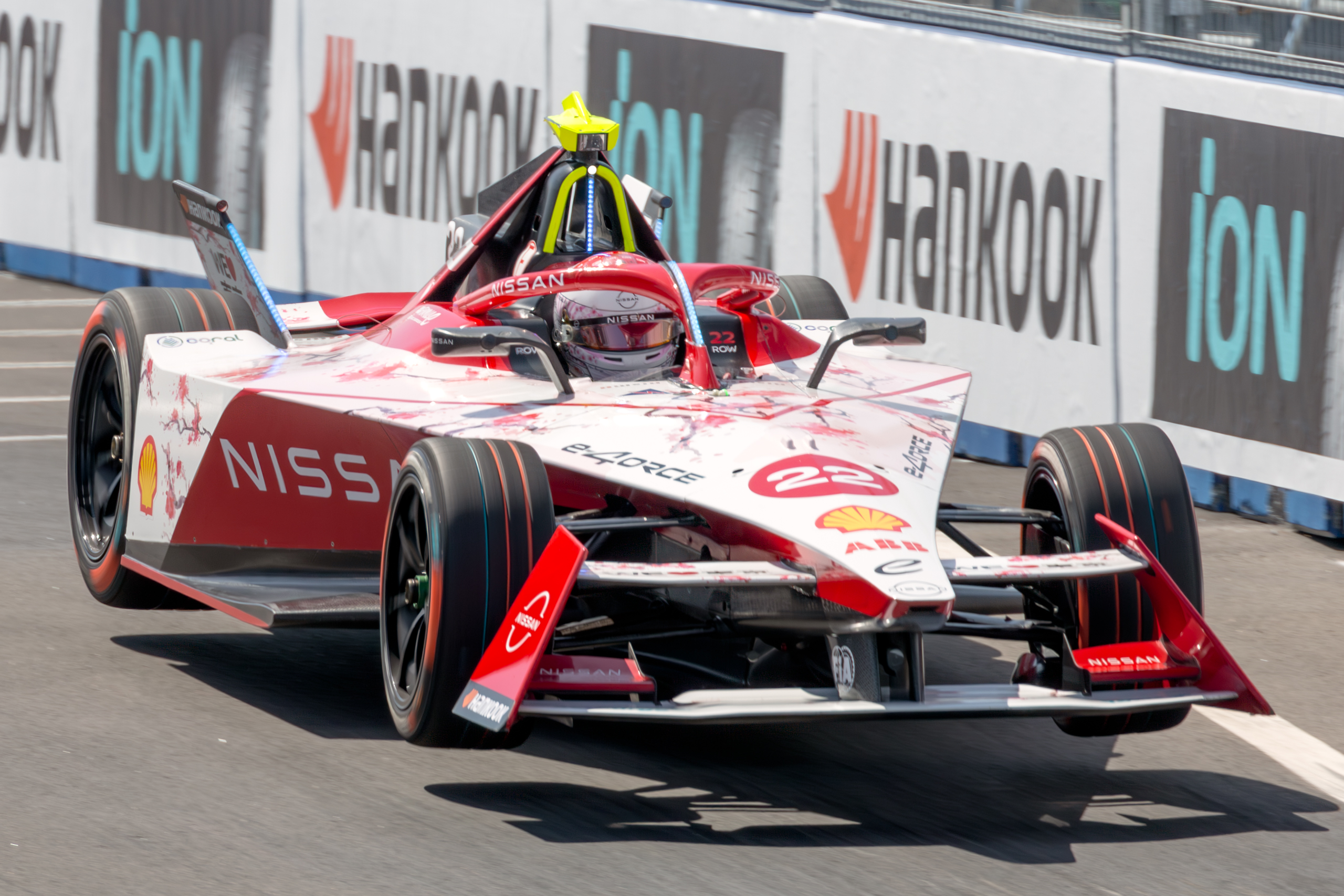
Rowland at the 2024 Tokyo ePrix

Rowland reunited with Nissan, the team he drove from 2018 to 2021, for the 2023–24 season alongside Sacha Fenestraz. Rowland had the best season of his Formula E career, scoring 7 podiums, 2 pole positions and 2 wins, finishing the season in 4th with 156 points, beating Fenestraz who finished 17th with only 26 points.

==== 2024–25 season: World Champion ====
Rowland remained with Nissan for the 2024–25 season alongside Norman Nato, who replaced Sacha Fenestraz. Having lost out on pole position for the opening round in São Paulo, Rowland controlled a large part of the race before receiving a late drive-through penalty for overpower, one that left him 14th. His season kicked off in Mexico City, where Rowland passed António Félix da Costa with attack mode and held on to claim his first victory of the season. Another strong performance, this time during Jeddah race 1, left Rowland second as he was passed by Maximilian Günther moments before the finish line. He then won race 2 with a six-second gap to Taylor Barnard. Despite falling from fourth at the flag to tenth on the results sheet in Miami, having been one of multiple drivers who failed to finish their attack modes before the end, Rowland retained the championship lead.

Rowland's successful season continued in Monaco: during race 1, he claimed the lead after arming his attack mode later than the other frontrunners, and achieved a commanding victory. Rowland then took pole for race 2 and finished second behind an imperious Sébastien Buemi. Similarly, Rowland finished second from pole during race 1 in Tokyo, with Stoffel Vandoorne having benefited from a fortunately timed red flag to snatch a dominant lead. Rowland took pole on Sunday and came out on top in fights with Pascal Wehrlein, Dan Ticktum, and Taylor Barnard to take victory for the fourth time that year. After fiercely contested races in Shanghai, which he finished fifth and 13th, Rowland sat 68 points ahead of Wehrlein at the top of the standings.

Having been penalised for causing a collision with Günther, Rowland was classified tenth at Jakarta. During race 1 of the Berlin round, Rowland retired after hitting Stoffel Vandoorne in the closing stages. Nevertheless, Rowland battled for the lead in race 2 and eventually finished fourth, allowing him to claim the championship two races early.

==== 2025–26 season ====
Rowland signed a multi-year deal to continue with Nissan into the 2025–26 season, once again alongside Norman Nato.

==== 2026–27 season ====
For the 2026–27 season, Rowland will be partnered by Zane Maloney who replaced Nato.

== Racing record ==
=== Career summary ===
Season	Series	Team	Races	Wins	Poles	F/Laps	Podiums	Points	Position
2010	Formula Renault UK Winter Series	CRS Racing	6	1	0	0	1	95	7th
2011	Formula Renault UK	Fortec Motorsport	20	4	3	4	13	475	**2nd**
2011	Formula Renault UK Finals Series	Fortec Competition	6	4	0	3	6	190	**1st**
2012	Eurocup Formula Renault 2.0	Fortec Motorsport	14	1	0	0	3	109	**3rd**
2013	Eurocup Formula Renault 2.0	Manor MP Motorsport	14	3	2	2	8	179	**2nd**
2013	Formula Renault 2.0 NEC	Manor MP Motorsport	8	4	4	4	8	208	4th
2013	Pau Formula Renault 2.0 Trophy	Manor MP Motorsport	1	0	0	0	0	N/A	4th
2014	Formula Renault 3.5 Series	Fortec Motorsports	17	2	3	1	7	181	4th
2015	Formula Renault 3.5 Series	Fortec Motorsports	17	8	7	4	13	307	**1st**
2015	GP2 Series	MP Motorsport	4	0	0	0	0	3	21st
2015	GP2 Series	Status Grand Prix	3	0	0	0	0	3	21st
2015–16	Formula E	Mahindra Racing	1	0	0	0	0	0	21st
2016	GP2 Series	MP Motorsport	22	0	0	0	4	107	9th
2017	FIA Formula 2 Championship	DAMS	22	2	1	2	10	191	**3rd**
2017	Formula One	Renault F1 Team	Development driver						
2018	Blancpain GT Series Endurance Cup	Strakka Racing	2	0	0	0	0	6	41st
2018	24 Hours of Le Mans	CEFC TRSM Racing	1	0	0	0	0	N/A	DNF
2018	Intercontinental GT Challenge	Mercedes-AMG Team Strakka Racing	1	0	0	0	0	6	22nd
2018	Formula One	Williams Martini Racing	Development driver						
2018–19	Formula E	Nissan e.Dams	13	0	3	0	2	71	10th
2018–19	FIA World Endurance Championship	CEFC TRSM Racing	1	0	0	0	0	0	NC
2019–20	Formula E	Nissan e.Dams	11	1	1	1	1	83	5th
2020–21	Formula E	Nissan e.Dams	15	0	1	1	2	77	14th
2021–22	Formula E	Mahindra Racing	16	0	1	0	1	32	14th
2022–23	Formula E	Mahindra Racing	9	0	0	0	0	9	21st
2023–24	Formula E	Nissan Formula E Team	14	2	2	1	7	156	4th
2024–25	Formula E	Nissan Formula E Team	16	4	2 (Note: Qualifying was cancelled for round 8 of the 2024–25 Formula E season, with the grid being determined based on free practice 2 results. Since Rowland finished first in free practice, he started first; but was not awarded any points for pole position. Formula E is not considering it an official pole position.)	0	7	184	**1st**
2025–26	Formula E	Nissan Formula E Team	17	1	0	3	6	137	4th
2026–27	Formula E	Nissan Formula E Team	0	0	0	0	0	0	TBD

* Season still in progress.

=== Complete Formula Renault 2.0 UK Championship results ===
(key) (Races in bold indicate pole position) (Races in italics indicate fastest lap)

Year	Entrant	1	2	3	4	5	6	7	8	9	10	11	12	13	14	15	16	17	18	19	20	Pos	Points
2011	Fortec Motorsports	BRI; 1; 5	BRI; 2 Ret	DON; 1; 3	DON; 2; 3	THR; 1; 3	THR; 2; 3	OUL; 1; 4	OUL; 2; 2	CRO; 1; 3	CRO; 2 Ret	SNE; 1; 4	SNE; 2; 7	SIL1; 1; 5	SIL1; 2; 2	**ROC**; **1**; 1	ROC; 2; 2	**BHGP**; **1**; 1	**BHGP**; **2**; 1	SIL2; 1; 2	SIL2; 2; 1	2nd	475

=== Complete Eurocup Formula Renault 2.0 results ===
(key) (Races in bold indicate pole position) (Races in italics indicate fastest lap)

Year	Entrant	1	2	3	4	5	6	7	8	9	10	11	12	13	14	Pos	Points
2012	Fortec Motorsports	ALC; 1; 6	ALC; 2; 8	SPA; 1; 26	SPA; 2; 4	NÜR; 1; 8	NÜR; 2 Ret	MSC; 1; 3	MSC; 2; 3	HUN; 1; 16	HUN; 2; 6	LEC; 1; 15	LEC; 2; 6	CAT; 1; 5	CAT; 2; 1	3rd	109
2013	Manor MP Motorsport	ALC; 1; 10	ALC; 2; 3	SPA; 1; 1	SPA; 2; 33	MSC; 1; 2	MSC; 2; 1	RBR; 1; 5	**RBR**; **2**; 1	HUN; 1; 8	**HUN**; **2**; 3	LEC; 1; 6	LEC; 2; 3	CAT; 1; 2	CAT; 2; 28	2nd	179

=== Complete Formula Renault 2.0 NEC results ===
(key) (Races in bold indicate pole position) (Races in italics indicate fastest lap)

Year	Entrant	1	2	3	4	5	6	7	8	9	10	11	12	13	14	15	16	17	DC	Points
2013	Manor MP Motorsport	HOC; 1; 3	HOC; 2; 2	HOC; 3; 2	NÜR; 1	NÜR; 2	SIL; 1	SIL; 2	SPA; 1	SPA; 2	ASS; 1	ASS; 2	**MST**; **1**; 1	**MST**; **2**; 1	MST; 3; 3	**ZAN**; **1**; 1	**ZAN**; **2**; 1	ZAN; 3 C	4th	208

=== Complete Formula Renault 3.5 Series results ===
(key) (Races in bold indicate pole position) (Races in italics indicate fastest lap)

Year	Team	1	2	3	4	5	6	7	8	9	10	11	12	13	14	15	16	17	Pos	Points
2014	Fortec Motorsports	MNZ; 1; 6	MNZ; 2; 10	ALC; 1; 3	**ALC**; **2**; 1	MON; 1; 5	SPA; 1 Ret	SPA; 2; 3	MSC; 1 Ret	MSC; 2; 5	NÜR; 1; 4	NÜR; 2 Ret	**HUN**; **1**; 3	HUN; 2; 4	LEC; 1; 13	LEC; 2; 3	JER; 1; 2	**JER**; **2**; 1	4th	181
2015	Fortec Motorsports	ALC; 1; 1	ALC; 2; 3	MON; 1; 6	SPA; 1; 5	**SPA**; **2**; 1	**HUN**; **1**; 3	HUN; 2; 1	**RBR**; **1**; 1	RBR; 2; 2	SIL; 1; 2	SIL; 2; 1	**NÜR**; **1**; 1	**NÜR**; **2**; 10	**BUG**; **1**; 1	BUG; 2; 8	JER; 1; 1	**JER**; **2**; 2	1st	307

=== Complete GP2 Series/FIA Formula 2 Championship results ===
(key) (Races in bold indicate pole position) (Races in italics indicate fastest lap)

Year	Entrant	1	2	3	4	5	6	7	8	9	10	11	12	13	14	15	16	17	18	19	20	21	22	DC	Points
2015	MP Motorsport	BHR; FEA	BHR; SPR	CAT; FEA	CAT; SPR	MON; FEA	MON; SPR	RBR; FEA	RBR; SPR	SIL; FEA; 10	SIL; SPR; 7	HUN; FEA	HUN; SPR	SPA; FEA; NC	SPA; SPR; Ret	MNZ; FEA	MNZ; SPR	SOC; FEA	SOC; SPR					21st	3
2015	Status Grand Prix																			BHR; FEA; 22	BHR; SPR; Ret	YMC; FEA; 15	YMC; SPR; C	21st	3
2016	MP Motorsport	CAT; FEA; 10	CAT; SPR; 6	MON; FEA; 3	MON; SPR; 7	BAK; FEA; 4	BAK; SPR; 15†	RBR; FEA; 6	RBR; SPR; 2	SIL; FEA; 3	SIL; SPR; 3	HUN; FEA; 11	HUN; SPR; 6	HOC; FEA; 5	HOC; SPR; 5	SPA; FEA; 10	SPA; SPR; 6	MNZ; FEA; 9	MNZ; SPR; 9	SEP; FEA; 12	SEP; SPR; 8	YMC; FEA; Ret	YMC; SPR; 11	9th	107
2017	DAMS	BHR; FEA; 5	BHR; SPR; 3	CAT; FEA; 3	CAT; SPR; 2	MON; FEA; 1	MON; SPR; 9	BAK; FEA; 7	BAK; SPR; Ret	RBR; FEA; 4	RBR; SPR; 3	SIL; FEA; 3	SIL; SPR; 17	**HUN**; **FEA**; 1	HUN; SPR; 2	SPA; FEA; DSQ	SPA; SPR; 8	MNZ; FEA; Ret	MNZ; SPR; 11	JER; FEA; 2	JER; SPR; 3	YMC; FEA; DSQ	YMC; SPR; 7	3rd	191

^{†} Did not finish, but was classified as he had completed more than 90% of the race distance.

=== Complete Formula E results ===
(key) (Races in bold indicate pole position; races in italics indicate fastest lap)

Year	Team	Chassis	Powertrain	1	2	3	4	5	6	7	8	9	10	11	12	13	14	15	16	17	Pos	Points
2015–16	Mahindra Racing	Spark SRT01-e	Mahindra M2ELECTRO	BEI	PUT	PDE; 13	BUE	MEX	LBH	PAR	BER	LDN	LDN								21st	0
2018–19	Nissan e.dams	Spark SRT05e	Nissan IM01	ADR; 7	MRK; 15	SCL; Ret	MEX; 20†	HKG; Ret	**SYX**; 2	RME; 6	**PAR**; 12	**MCO**; 2	BER; 8	BRN; Ret	NYC; 14	NYC; 6					10th	71
2019–20	Nissan e.dams	Spark SRT05e	Nissan IM02	DIR; 4	DIR; 5	SCL; 17	MEX; 7	MRK; 9	BER; 14	BER; 7	BER; 6	BER; 5	**BER**; 1	BER; Ret							5th	83
2020–21	Nissan e.dams	Spark SRT05e	Nissan IM02/IM03	DIR; 6	DIR; 7	RME; 12	RME; 16	VLC; DSQ	VLC; 4	MCO; 6	PUE; DSQ	**PUE**; 3	NYC; 7	NYC; 19	LDN; DSQ	LDN; 18	BER; 13	BER; 2			14th	77
2021–22	Mahindra Racing	Spark SRT05e	Mahindra M7Electro	DRH; Ret	DRH; 8	MEX; 16	RME; Ret	RME; Ret	MCO; Ret	BER; 11	BER; 7	JAK; Ret	MRK; 10	NYC; 13	NYC; 14	LDN; Ret	LDN; Ret	**SEO**; 2	SEO; Ret		14th	32
2022–23	Mahindra Racing	Formula E Gen3	Mahindra M9Electro	MEX; 13	DRH; 19	DRH; Ret	HYD; 6	CAP; WD	SAP; 15	BER; 10	BER; 14	MCO; Ret	JAK	JAK	POR	RME	RME	LDN	LDN		21st	9
2023–24	Nissan Formula E Team	Formula E Gen3	Nissan e-4ORCE 04	MEX; 11	DRH; 13	**DRH**; 3	SAP; 3	**TOK**; 2	MIS; 1	MIS; Ret	MCO; 6	BER; 3	BER; 3	SHA; 4	SHA; 10	POR; WD	POR; WD	LDN; 15	LDN; 1		4th	156
2024–25	Nissan Formula E Team	Formula E Gen3 Evo	Nissan e-4ORCE 05	SAO; 14	MEX; 1	JED; 2	JED; 1	MIA; 10	MCO; 1	**MCO**; 2	TKO; 2	**TKO**; 1	SHA; 5	SHA; 13	JKT; 10	BER; Ret	BER; 4	LDN; 11	LDN; Ret		1st	184
2025–26	Nissan Formula E Team	Formula E Gen3 Evo	Nissan e-4ORCE 05	SAO; 2	MEX; 3	MIA; 12	JED; 17	JED; 3	MAD; 16	BER; 3	BER; 2	MCO; 15	MCO; 1	SAN; Ret	SHA; 12	SHA; 8	TKO; 7	TKO; 4	LDN; 10	LDN; 9	4th	137

^{†} Did not finish, but was classified as he had completed more than 90% of the race distance.
^{*} Season still in progress.

=== Complete FIA World Endurance Championship results ===
(key) (Races in bold indicate pole position; races in italics indicate fastest lap)

Year	Entrant	Class	Chassis	Engine	1	2	3	4	5	6	7	8	Rank	Points
2018–19	CEFC TRSM Racing	LMP1	Ginetta G60-LT-P1	Mecachrome V634P1 3.4 L Turbo V6	SPA; WD	LMS; Ret	SIL	FUJ	SHA	SEB	SPA	LMS	NC	0

=== 24 Hours of Le Mans Results ===
Year	Team	Co-Drivers	Car	Class	Laps	Pos.	Class Pos.
2018	(China) CEFC TRSM Racing	(United Kingdom) Alex Brundle (United Kingdom) Oliver Turvey	Ginetta G60-LT-P1-Mecachrome	LMP1	137	DNF	DNF

== Notes ==
Sporting positions
Preceded by Carlos Sainz Jr.	Formula Renault 3.5 Series; Champion; 2015	Succeeded by Tom Dillmann (Formula V8 3.5)
Awards
Preceded by Lewis Williamson	McLaren Autosport BRDC Award; 2011	Succeeded by Jake Dennis
