= Sean Gelael =

Indonesian racing driver (born 1996)

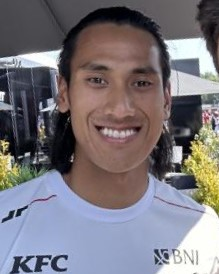
- Gelael in 2023
- Nationality: (Indonesia) Indonesian
- Born: Muhammad Sean Ricardo Gelael; 1 November 1996 (age 30) Jakarta, Indonesia
- Categorisation: FIA Silver

FIA World Endurance Championship career
- Debut season: 2016
- Current team: Team WRT
- Car number: 32
- Former teams: Extreme Speed Motorsports, Jota Sport, United Autosports
- Starts: 46
- Championships: 0
- Wins: 6
- Podiums: 16
- Poles: 4
- Fastest laps: 0
- Best finish: 2nd in 2021, 2022

Previous series
- 2017–20 2015–16 2015 2013–14 2013–14 2012 2012: FIA Formula 2 Championship; GP2 Series; Formula Renault 3.5 Series; FIA European Formula 3 British Formula 3 Formula Pilota China; Formula Abarth

Muhammad Sean Ricardo Gelael (born 1 November 1996) is an Indonesian racing driver who is currently competing with Team WRT in the FIA World Endurance Championship. He has scored two Le Mans class podiums as his respective teams' silver-ranked driver, finishing second with Jota in the LMP2 class in 2021 and second again with WRT in 2024's LMGT3 category.

== Early career ==
Gelael started racing in 2005, where he became the navigator of his father Ricardo Gelael in Rally of Indonesia. In 2007, he set a record from MURI for being the youngest racing navigator at the age of ten.

=== Karting ===
In 2011, Gelael competed in the Asian Karting Open Championship – Formula 125 Senior Open 2011, finishing third in the overall standings.

=== Lower formulae ===
Gelael began his car racing career in his native continent, competing in the Formula Pilota China in 2012. He finished his debut season fourth in the overall standings and second in the "Best Asian Trophy" standings. He raced for the BVM team in the last round of the 2012 Formula Abarth season at Monza.

=== FIA European Formula 3 Championship ===
==== 2013 ====
In 2013, Gelael participated in the 2013 FIA European Formula 3 Championship season, joining the Double R Racing team. During the same year, the Indonesian driver made an appearance in the Masters of Formula 3, although he was forced to retire from the race.

==== 2014 ====
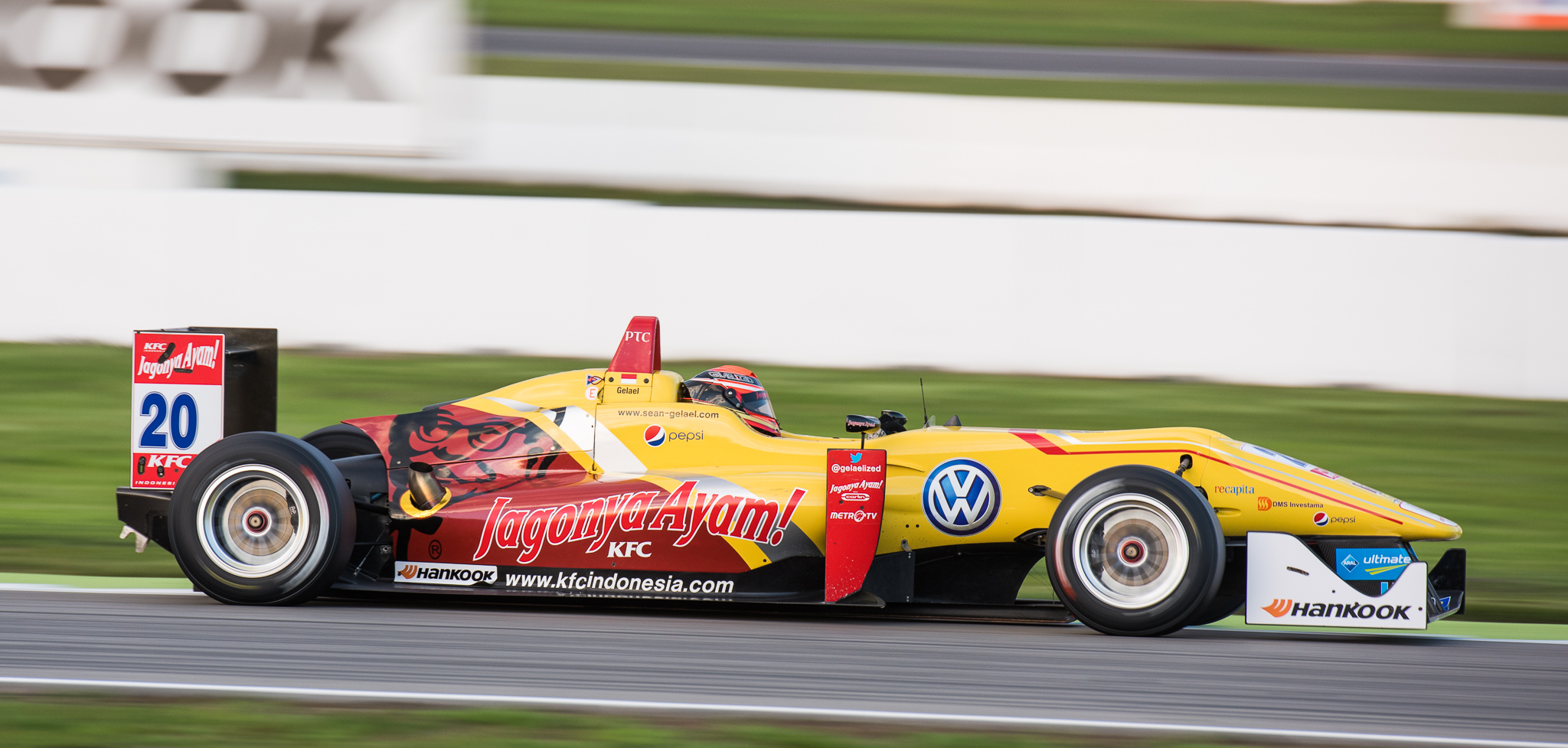
Gelael racing at the Hockenheimring in the 2014 FIA Formula 3 European Championship

In 2014, Gelael signed with Carlin for the 2014 season. On 10 May 2014, he scored his first ever point in the championship, finishing tenth and therefore scoring one point in the Pau Grand Prix. He finished the season in 18th position with 25 points.

=== British Formula 3 Championship ===
Gelael competed in the 2013 British Formula 3 International Series alongside Antonio Giovinazzi, driving for Double R Racing. He claimed his first podium in at Silverstone by finishing third in the second race. He finished eight in the final overall standings.

=== Formula Renault 3.5 Series ===
On 20 January 2015, it was announced that Gelael would compete in the 2015 Formula Renault 3.5 Series with Carlin partnering with Tom Dillmann. He finished 19th in the overall standings.

=== GP2 Series/FIA Formula 2 Championship ===
==== 2015 ====
Gelael made his GP2 Series debut with Carlin Motorsport in the Hungaroring in the 2015 season. He finished 18th in the feature race and 20th in the sprint race.

==== 2016 ====
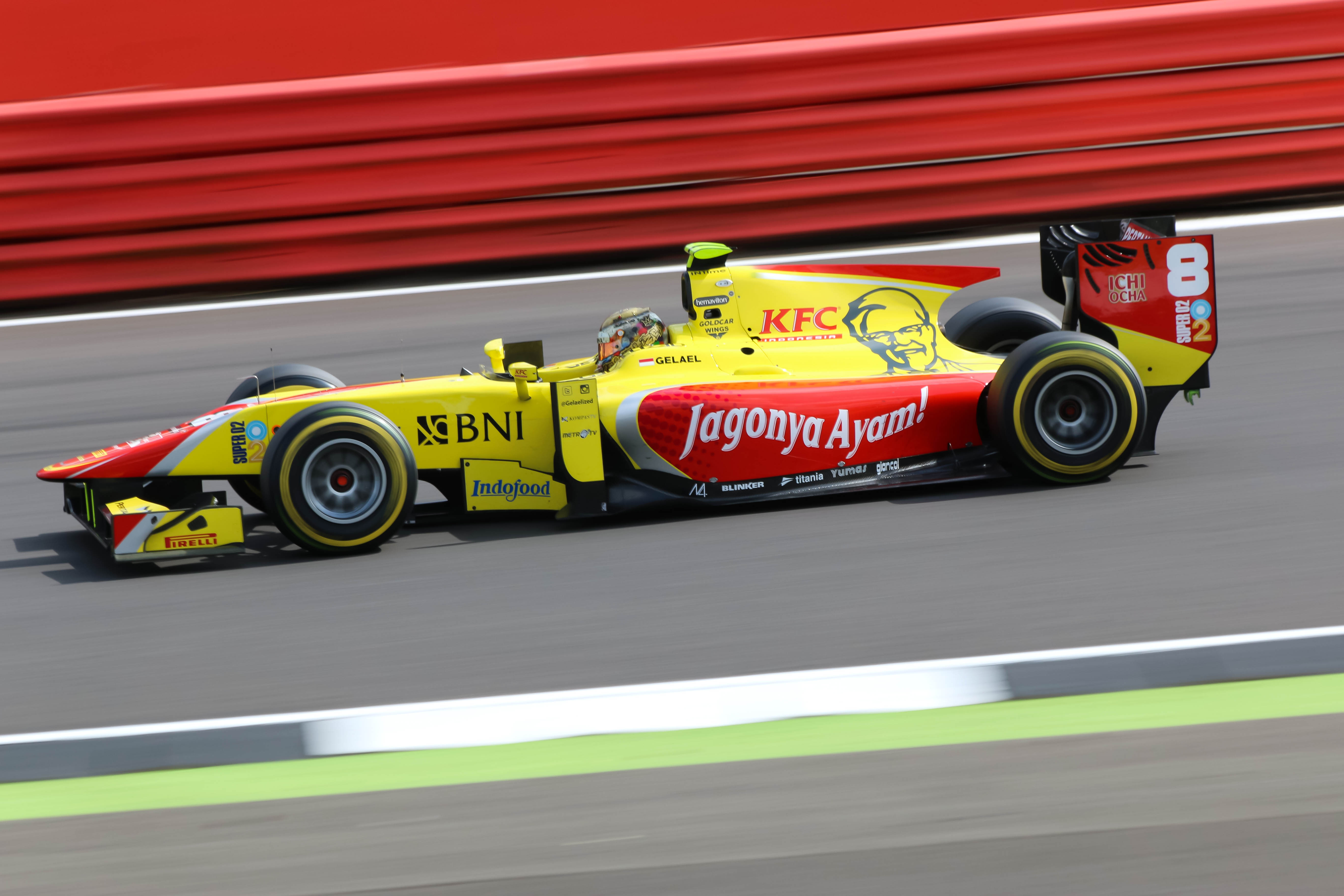
Gelael during the 2016 Silverstone GP2 Series round

In 2016, Gelael competed full-time in the GP2 Series with Campos Racing, partnering Mitch Evans. At Catalunya, he finished 19th in the feature race having started from 22nd on the grid. He scored his first podium at the Red Bull Ring, where he finished second behind his teammate Evans, who won the race.

==== 2017 ====
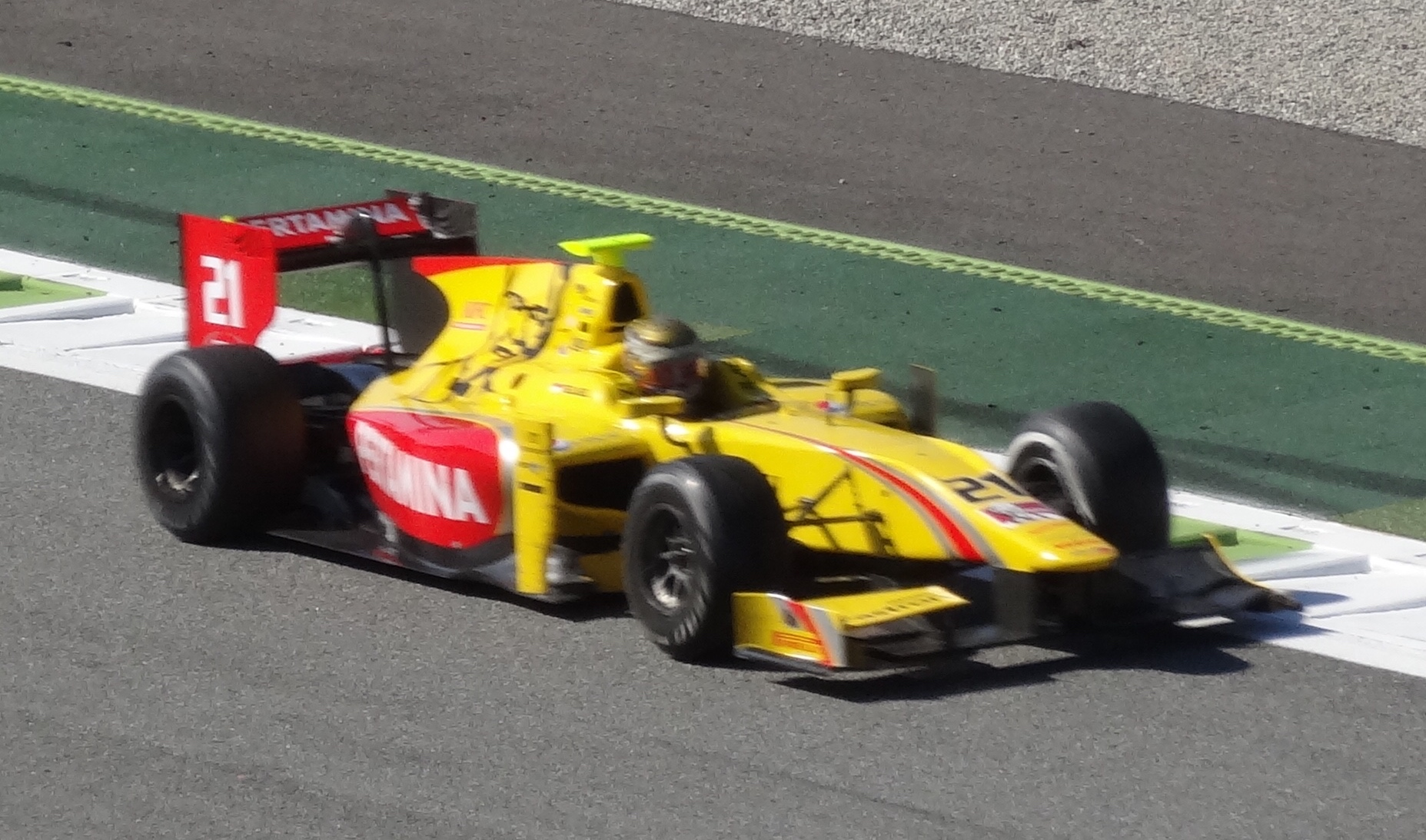
Gelael at the 2017 Monza Formula 2 round with Pertamina Arden

With the championship rebranded to the FIA Formula 2 Championship, Gelael moved to the Pertamina Arden team for the 2017 season, joining Norman Nato. Gelael lost the team battle, finishing in points-paying positions just in four races.

==== 2018 ====
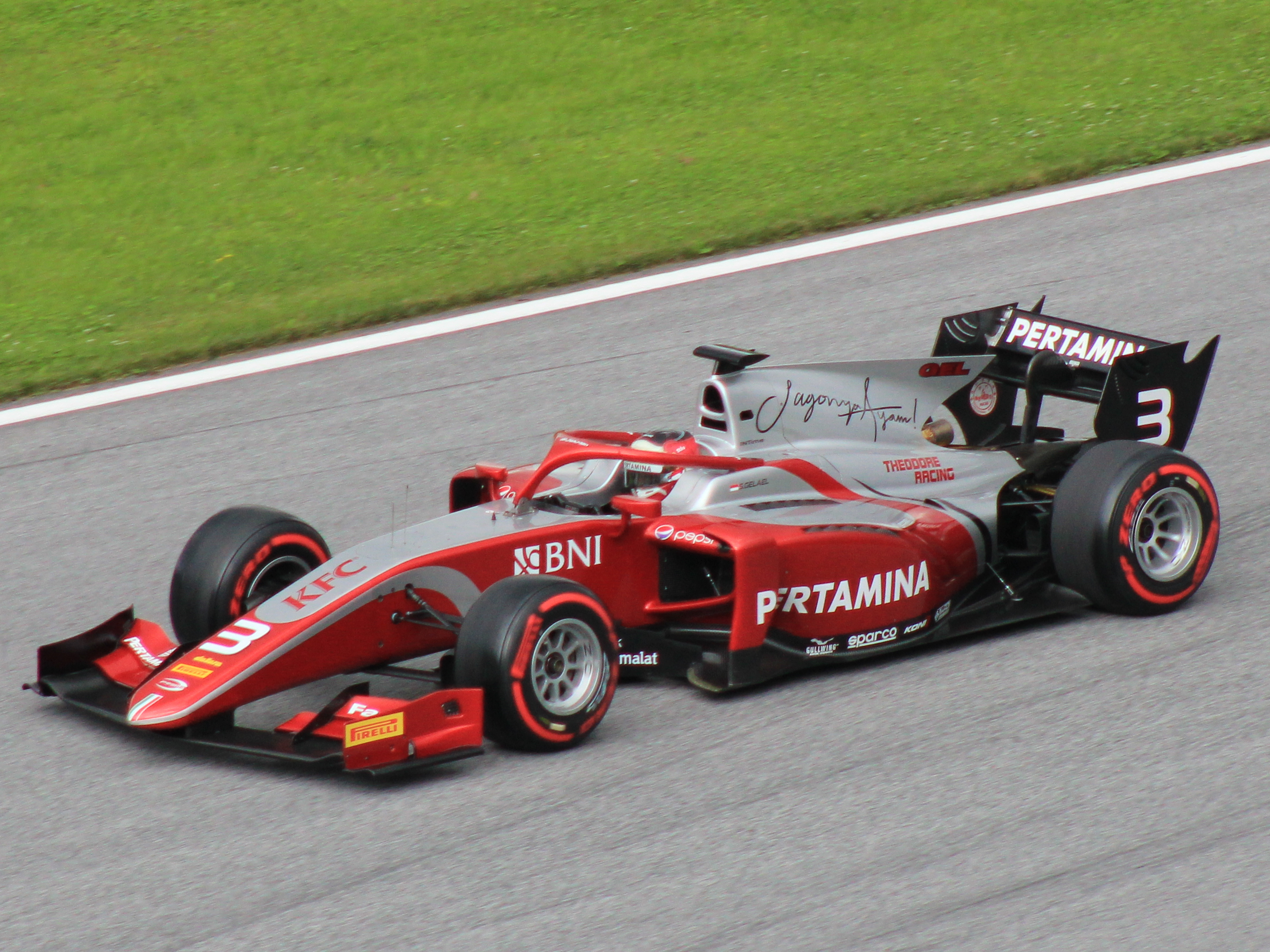
Gelael racing for Prema Racing at the 2018 Spielberg Formula 2 round

Gelael raced for Prema Racing in the 2018 season, joining Dutch driver Nyck de Vries. In the Monaco, he scored his only podium for the season, finishing second in the feature race. He failed to score points for the rest of the season following his podium finish. He placed 15th with 29 points in the overall standings.

==== 2019 ====
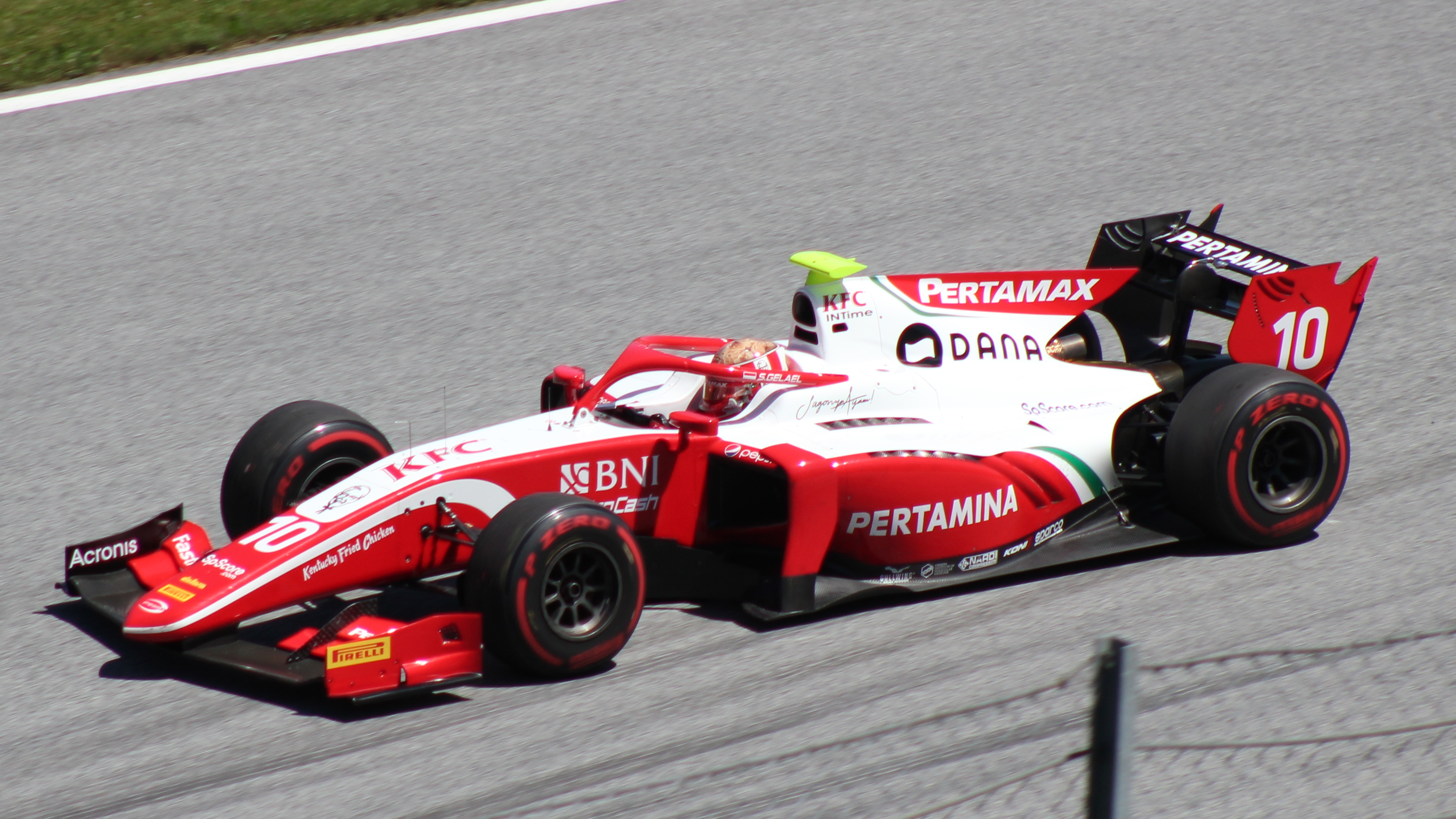
Gelael at the 2019 Spielberg Formula 2 round for his second season with Prema

For the 2019 season, Gelael remained with Prema, partnered by 2018 FIA Formula 3 European Championship winner Mick Schumacher. He lost the team battle, finishing in 17th position in the drivers' standings by scoring points in just five races.

==== 2020 ====
Gelael left Prema to join reigning FIA Formula 2 teams' champion DAMS for the 2020 season, replacing Sérgio Sette Câmara. He was joined by two-time Macau Grand Prix winner and Williams Driver Academy member Dan Ticktum. He scored points in both races of the second round at the Red Bull Ring, finishing tenth and seventh. He broke a vertebra from an impact with a kerb during the Barcelona feature race, and was unable to start the sprint race. He was replaced at DAMS by Red Bull Junior Team driver Jüri Vips for the next four rounds. At the time of his injury he had scored three points, compared to 61 points for teammate Ticktum.

==== FIA Formula 2 departure ====
Due to a string of accidents and technical failures, followed by Gelael's seldom points-scoring performances in FIA Formula 2 Championship that contributed to poor seasons, Gelael's father Ricardo Gelael announced that his son will no longer continue racing in Formula 2 after the 2020 season.

=== Formula One ===
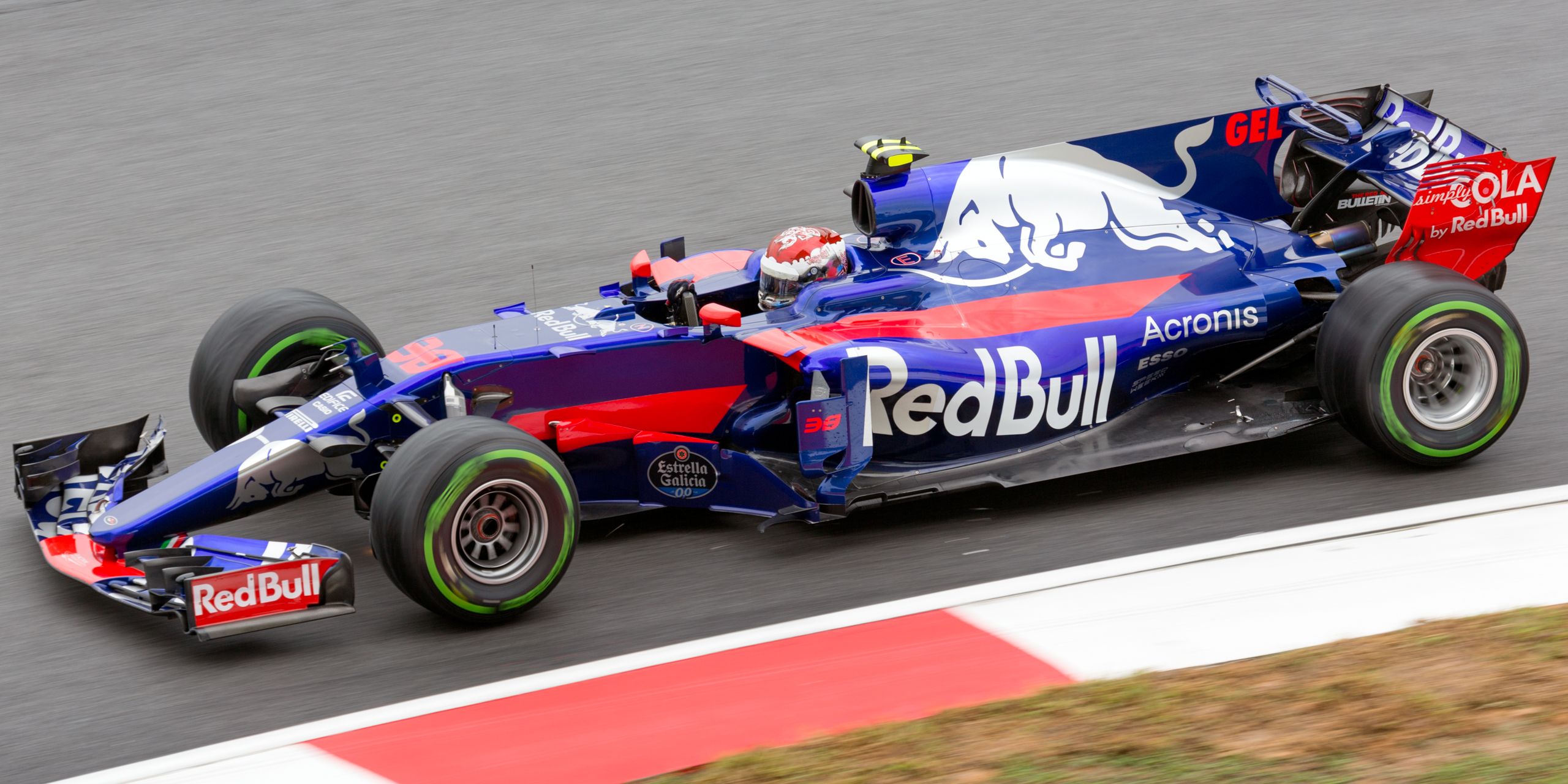
Gelael driving a Toro Rosso during free practice for the 2017 Malaysian Grand Prix

Gelael had his first experience of Formula One machinery, driving the Toro Rosso STR12 at the in-season test after the 2017 Bahrain Grand Prix, completing 78 laps. He continued to drive for Toro Rosso in a testing capacity throughout the 2017 season, including tests at the Hungaroring and Yas Marina Circuit as well as Friday practice appearances in Singapore, Malaysia, the United States and Mexico. He continued his association with Toro Rosso during the 2018 season, appearing at testing days in Spain, Hungary and Abu Dhabi, and at the Friday practice session of the United States Grand Prix. In 2019, Gelael again took part in the post-season tyre test for Toro Rosso in Abu Dhabi.

== Sportscar career ==
=== 2016: Debut success ===
Gelael stepped into the Asian Le Mans Series during the second half of 2015–16 season to gather his first experience in endurance racing. Competing for Jagonya Ayam with Eurasia alongside Antonio Giovinazzi, the pair won both races they drove in and finished third in the standings.

During the same year, Gelael would also make his FIA World Endurance Championship debut with Extreme Speed Motorsports, competing in the last three rounds of the season.

=== 2021: Title assaults ===
Following the conclusion to his time in Formula 2, Gelael returned to the ALMS for the entirety of the 2021 campaign, driving for Jota Sport alongside Formula E drivers Stoffel Vandoorne and Tom Blomqvist in the LMP2 category. He finished second and fifth in Dubai and won both races in Abu Dhabi, which placed him second in the standings.

Gelael's main focus for 2021 would lie in the World Endurance Championship, where he once again partnered Vandoorne and Blomqvist at Jota Sport. Following a pair of podiums at the beginning of the season, a strong performance from the team would see the trio finish second in class at the 24 Hours of Le Mans. Despite rounding off the season with two further appearances on the rostrum, Gelael and his teammates would miss out on the title to Team WRT, who had managed to win the final three races, which left Jota second in the LMP2 results. Following the end of the season, Gelael described the season as having been "really good", whilst equally ruing the team's missed opportunities to win races.

Gelael would make a guest appearance during the 4 Hours of Monza with Jota, finishing third alongside Malaysian driver Jazeman Jaafar.

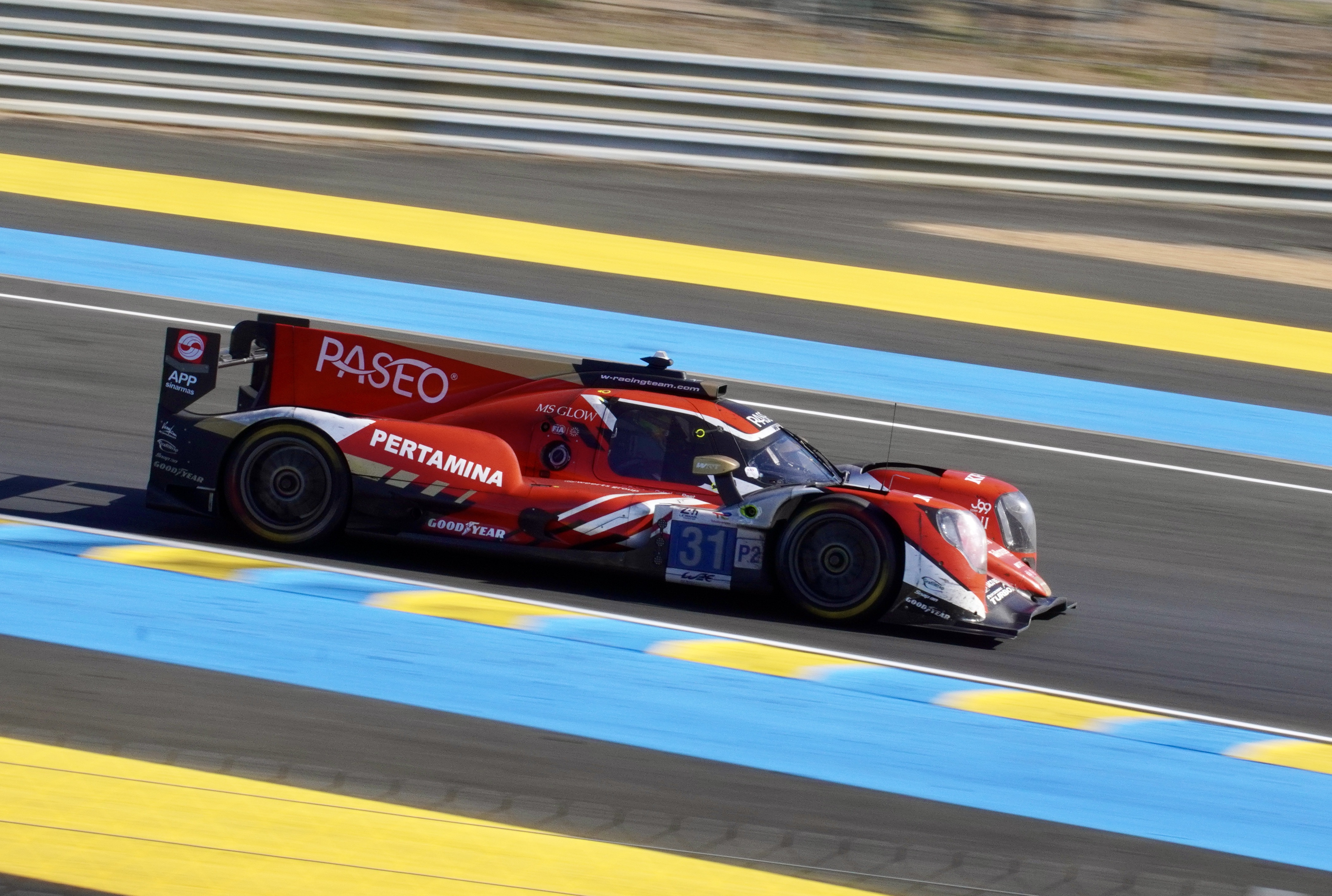
#31 Oreca 07 from Team WRT driven by Robin Frijns, Rene Rast and Sean Gelael

=== 2022: Adding victories ===
In 2022, Gelael continued to race in the World Endurance Championship, switching teams to previous year's champions WRT to drive alongside Robin Frijns and René Rast. After starting the season with a strong second place at a rain-shortened race in Sebring, the Indonesian took his maiden win in the category at the 6 Hours of Spa-Francorchamps. Dramatic scenes would occur at the 24 Hours of Le Mans, as, having started from pole due to an impressive lap from Frijns, the team was forced to retire with hours to go after the Dutchman had made an error and collided with the barriers. The outfit was set back further in Monza, where a twelfth place following a radiator issue made them miss out on points for the second race in a row. At the penultimate race in Fuji, Gelael, Frijns and substitute teammate Dries Vanthoor managed to win the race, having held off advances from the No. 38 Jota car in the dying embers of the event. Another victory at the 8 Hours of Bahrain would not be enough to take the title, as the team lost out to Jota by 21 points.

=== 2023: GT3 debut ===
At the start of 2023, Gelael teamed up with Valentino Rossi and three other drivers to compete in the Dubai 24 Hour event, driving a BMW M4 GT3 for WRT. The lineup experienced a positive weekend, completing a double-podium for the team by finishing third.

For a third year running, the World Endurance Championship would be the main destination for the Indonesian, who, along with Robin Frijns, remained at Team WRT to be partnered by Ferdinand Habsburg. The season proved to be a disappointment, as the No. 31 crew finished fourth in the teams' standings with a suspension problem denying them from a Le Mans podium and an engine failure costing them victory at Monza.

=== 2024: Full GT3 season ===
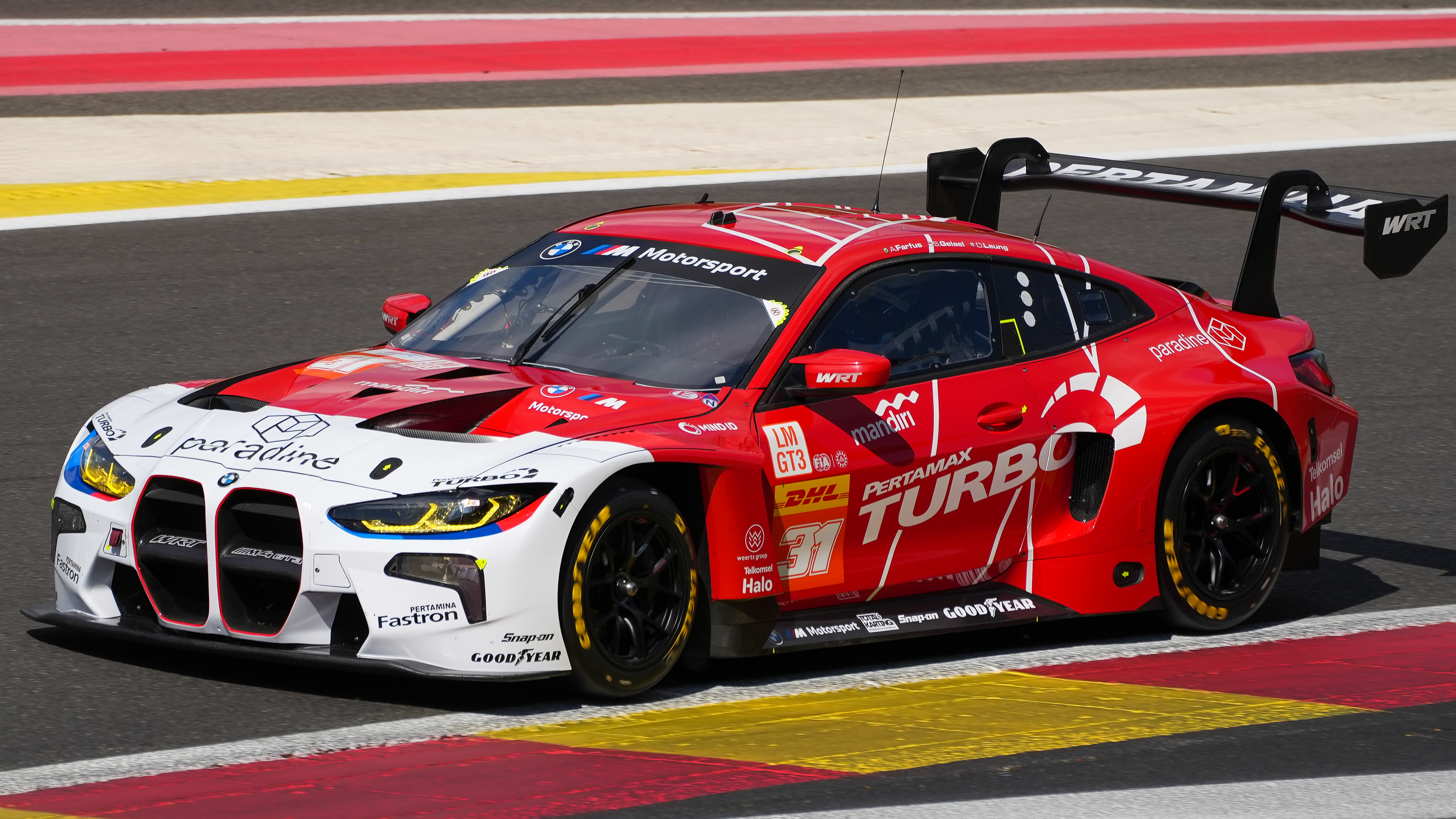
The No. 31 M4 GT3 driven by Gelael, Augusto Farfus, and Darren Leung during the 2024 6 Hours of Spa-Francorchamps

With the removal of LMP2 from the WEC, Gelael and WRT moved to the newly-formed LMGT3 class for the 2024 season. Alongside BMW factory driver Augusto Farfus and bronze-ranked Darren Leung, Gelael was able to take his first win in the category at Imola, before experiencing a hefty shunt caused by Earl Bamber on the Kemmel straight at Spa-Francorchamps from which the Indonesian escaped unharmed. Redemption came at the Le Mans 24 Hours, where the No. 31 turned out to be the only BMW entry to escape troubles, finishing second in class.

=== 2025: Move to United Autosports ===
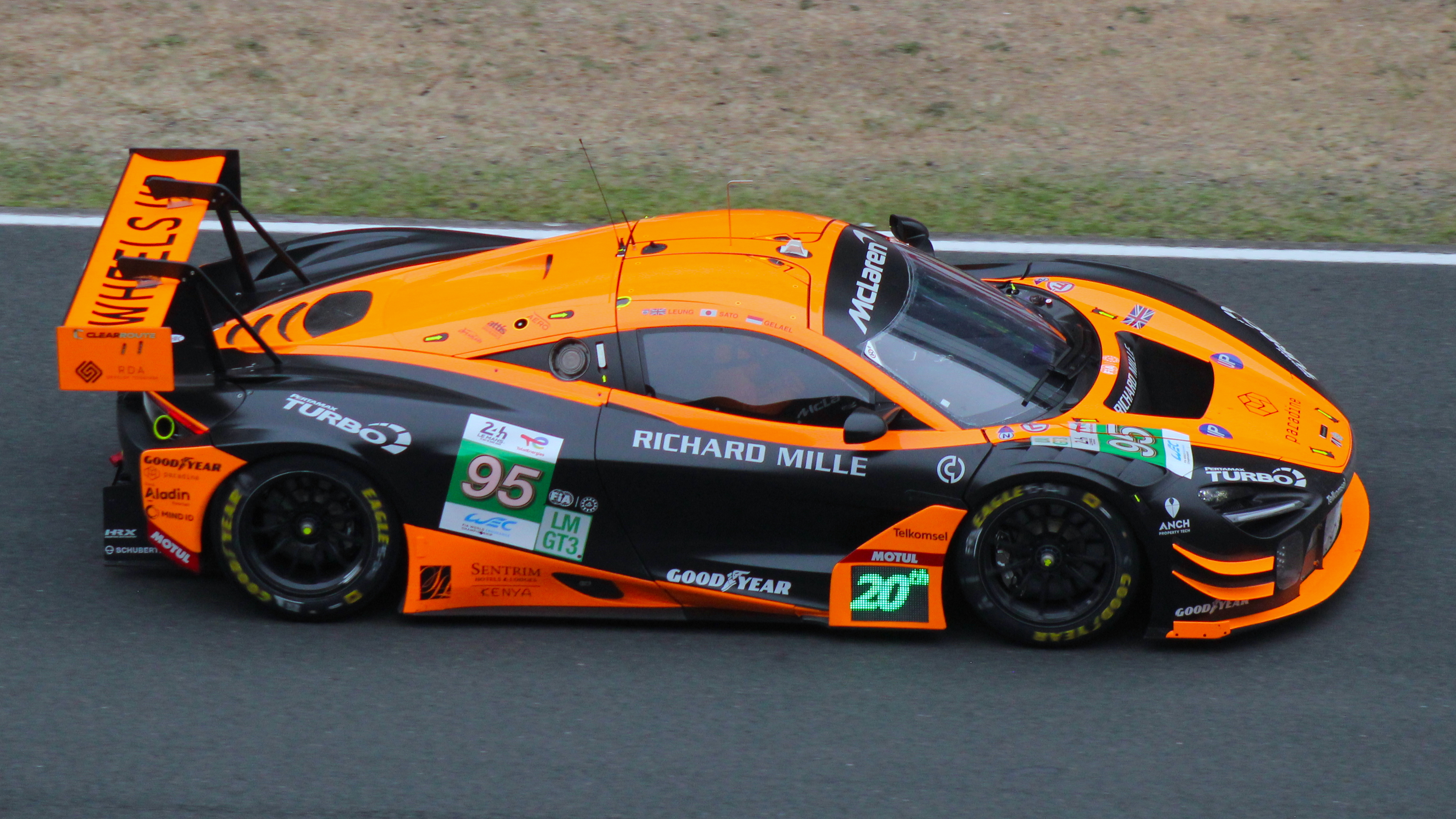
Gelael's No. 95 car at the 2025 24 Hours of Le Mans

On 3 January 2025, United Autosports confirmed that Gelael and his former WRT teammate Darren Leung would join the team for the 2025 season, partnering with Marino Sato in the No. 95 McLaren 720S GT3 Evo.

== Personal life ==
Gelael is the only son of the owner of Kentucky Fried Chicken's Indonesian franchise and former rally driver Ricardo Gelael and the youngest child of actress Rini S. Bono. He is the cousin of Indonesian tennis player Justin Barki. His late grandfather Dick Gelael is the founder of Gelael Supermarket and Multi Food Indonesia.

In October 2025, Gelael and actress Hana Malasan announced their engagement.

== Karting record ==
=== Karting career summary ===
| Season | Series | Team | Position |
|---|---|---|---|
| 2010 | CIK-FIA Asia-Pacific Championship — KF2 | Sean GP | 19th |
| 2010 | Bridgestone Cup European Final — KF2 | Sean GP | 26th |
| 2011 | Trofeo Grifone — KF2 | Sean GP | 4th |
| 2011 | Andrea Margutti Trophy — KF2 | Sean GP | 32nd |
| 2011 | Coppa Del Vesuvio — KF2 | Sean GP | 8th |
| 2011 | WSK Euro Series — KF2 | Sean GP | 49th |
| 2011 | CIK-FIA European Championship — KF2 | Sean GP | 7th |
| 2011 | CIK-FIA World Championship — KF2 | Sean GP | NC |
| 2011 | WSK Master Series — KF2 | Sean GP | NC |
| 2011 | Asian Karting Open Championship — Formula 125 Senior | Sean GP | 3rd |
| 2011 | Bridgestone Cup European Final — KF2 | Sean GP | NC |
| 2011 | CIK-FIA Asia-Pacific Championship — KF1 | Sean GP | 14th |
| 2012 | Indonesia Kart Prix — KF2 | Sean GP | 16th |
| 2012 | WSK Master Series — KF2 | Sean GP | 70th |
| 2012 | Andrea Margutti Trophy — KF2 | Sean GP | 50th |
| 2012 | WSK Euro Series — KF2 | Sean GP | 82nd |
| 2012 | CIK-FIA World Karting Championship — KF1 | Sean GP | 43rd |

== Racing record ==
=== Racing career summary ===
| Season | Series | Team | Races | Wins | Poles | F/Laps | Podiums | Points | Position |
|---|---|---|---|---|---|---|---|---|---|
| 2012 | Formula Pilota China | Eurasia Motorsport | 18 | 1 | 1 | 2 | 6 | 132 | 4th |
| 2012 | Formula Abarth | BVM | 3 | 0 | 0 | 0 | 0 | 0 | NC† |
| 2013 | FIA Formula 3 European Championship | Double R Racing | 30 | 0 | 0 | 0 | 0 | 0 | 28th |
| 2013 | British Formula 3 Championship | Double R Racing | 12 | 0 | 0 | 1 | 3 | 78 | 8th |
| 2013 | Masters of Formula 3 | Double R Racing | 1 | 0 | 0 | 0 | 0 | 0 | NC |
| 2014 | FIA Formula 3 European Championship | Jagonya Ayam with Carlin | 33 | 0 | 0 | 0 | 0 | 25 | 18th |
| 2014 | British Formula 3 Championship | Carlin | 3 | 0 | 0 | 0 | 3 | 0 | NC† |
| 2015 | Formula Renault 3.5 Series | Jagonya Ayam with Carlin | 17 | 0 | 0 | 0 | 0 | 7 | 19th |
| 2015 | GP2 Series | Carlin | 9 | 0 | 0 | 0 | 0 | 0 | 30th |
| 2015–16 | Asian Le Mans Series - LMP2 | Jagonya Ayam with Eurasia | 2 | 2 | 1 | 0 | 2 | 51 | 4th |
| 2016 | GP2 Series | Pertamina Campos Racing | 22 | 0 | 0 | 0 | 1 | 24 | 15th |
| 2016 | European Le Mans Series - LMP2 | SMP Racing | 1 | 0 | 0 | 0 | 0 | 10 | 24th |
| 2016 | FIA World Endurance Championship - LMP2 | Extreme Speed Motorsports | 3 | 0 | 0 | 0 | 1 | 40 | 12th |
| 2017 | FIA Formula 2 Championship | Pertamina Arden | 22 | 0 | 0 | 0 | 0 | 17 | 15th |
| 2017 | Formula One | Scuderia Toro Rosso | Test driver | | | | | | |
| 2018 | FIA Formula 2 Championship | Pertamina Prema Theodore Racing | 23 | 0 | 0 | 0 | 1 | 29 | 15th |
| 2018 | Formula One | Red Bull Toro Rosso Honda | Test driver | | | | | | |
| 2019 | FIA Formula 2 Championship | Prema Racing | 20 | 0 | 0 | 0 | 0 | 15 | 17th |
| 2019 | Formula One | Red Bull Toro Rosso Honda | Test driver | | | | | | |
| 2020 | FIA Formula 2 Championship | DAMS | 14 | 0 | 0 | 0 | 0 | 3 | 21st |
| 2021 | FIA World Endurance Championship - LMP2 | Jota Sport | 6 | 0 | 0 | 0 | 5 | 131 | **2nd** |
| 2021 | Asian Le Mans Series - LMP2 | Jota Sport | 4 | 2 | 0 | 0 | 3 | 78 | **2nd** |
| 2021 | 24 Hours of Le Mans - LMP2 | Jota Sport | 1 | 0 | 0 | 0 | 1 | N/A | **2nd** |
| 2021 | European Le Mans Series - LMP2 | Jota Sport | 1 | 0 | 0 | 0 | 1 | 0 | NC† |
| 2022 | FIA World Endurance Championship - LMP2 | WRT | 6 | 3 | 0 | 1 | 4 | 116 | **2nd** |
| 2022 | 24 Hours of Le Mans - LMP2 | WRT | 1 | 0 | 0 | 0 | 0 | N/A | DNF |
| 2022–23 | Middle East Trophy - GT3 | Monster VR46 with Team WRT | 1 | 0 | 0 | 0 | 1 | 0 | NC† |
| 2023 | FIA World Endurance Championship - LMP2 | Team WRT | 7 | 0 | 0 | 0 | 2 | 94 | 4th |
| 2023 | 24 Hours of Le Mans - LMP2 | Team WRT | 1 | 0 | 0 | 1 | 0 | N/A | 5th |
| 2023 | APRC - Asia Rally Cup | Jagonya Ayam | 2 | 1 | N/A | N/A | 1 | 43 | **2nd** |
| 2023–24 | Asian Le Mans Series - GT | Project 1 | 2 | 0 | 0 | 0 | 0 | 12 | 19th |
| 2023–24 | Asian Le Mans Series - GT | Saintéloc Racing | 1 | 0 | 0 | 0 | 0 | 12 | 19th |
| 2023–24 | Middle East Trophy - GT3 | Century Motorsport | 1 | 0 | 0 | 0 | 0 | 0 | NC† |
| 2024 | FIA World Endurance Championship - LMGT3 | Team WRT | 8 | 1 | 0 | 0 | 2 | 85 | 4th |
| 2024 | GT World Challenge Europe Sprint Cup | Team WRT | 2 | 0 | 0 | 0 | 0 | 0 | NC |
| 2024 | GT World Challenge Europe Sprint Cup - Silver Cup | Team WRT | 2 | 0 | 0 | 0 | 1 | 12 | 14th |
| 2025 | FIA World Endurance Championship - LMGT3 | United Autosports | 8 | 1 | 1 | 0 | 1 | 43 | 11th |
| 2025 | GT World Challenge Europe Endurance Cup | Paradine Competition | 5 | 0 | 0 | 0 | 0 | 0 | NC |
| 2025 | GT World Challenge Europe Endurance Cup - Bronze Cup | Paradine Competition | 5 | 0 | 0 | 0 | 1 | 46 | 7th |
| 2025–26 | Asian Le Mans Series - GT | AF Corse | 6 | 0 | 0 | 0 | 0 | 22 | 15th |
| 2026 | FIA World Endurance Championship - LMGT3 | Team WRT | 8 | 1 | 0 | 0 | 1 | 48 | 13th |
| 2026 | GT World Challenge Europe Endurance Cup | AF Corse | 4 | 0 | 0 | 0 | 0 | 10 | 24th |
| 2026 | GT World Challenge Asia | Garage 75 | 2 | 0 | 1 | 0 | 1 | 15 | 30th |

^{†} As Gelael was a guest driver, he was ineligible for points.

=== Complete Formula Pilota China results ===
(key) (Races in bold indicate pole position) (Races in italics indicate fastest lap)

| Year | Entrant | 1 | 2 | 3 | 4 | 5 | 6 | 7 | 8 | 9 | 10 | 11 | 12 | 13 | 14 | 15 | 16 | 17 | 18 | DC | Points |
|---|---|---|---|---|---|---|---|---|---|---|---|---|---|---|---|---|---|---|---|---|---|
| 2012 | Eurasia Motorsport | SHI; 1; 7 | SHI; 2; 5 | SHI; 3; 7 | ORD1; 1; 4 | ORD1; 2; 7 | ORD1; 3; 3 | ORD2; 1; 2 | ORD2; 2; 2 | **ORD2**; **3** Ret | GUA; 1; 4 | GUA; 2; 4 | GUA; 3; 3 | SEP1; 1; 7 | SEP1; 2; 4 | SEP1; 3; 9 | SEP2; 1 Ret | SEP2; 2; 3 | SEP2; 3; 1 | 4th | 132 |

=== Complete British Formula Three Championship results ===
(key) (Races in bold indicate pole position) (Races in italics indicate fastest lap)

| Year | Entrant | 1 | 2 | 3 | 4 | 5 | 6 | 7 | 8 | 9 | 10 | 11 | 12 | 13 | 14 | 15 | 16 | 17 | 18 | 19 | 20 | 21 | DC | Points |
|---|---|---|---|---|---|---|---|---|---|---|---|---|---|---|---|---|---|---|---|---|---|---|---|---|
| 2013 | Double R Racing | SIL; 1; 4 | SIL; 2; 3 | SIL; 3; 8 | SPA; 1; 3 | SPA; 2; 5 | SPA; 3; 8 | BRH; 1 Ret | BRH; 2; 6 | BRH; 3; 6 | NÜR; 1; 7 | NÜR; 2; 7 | NÜR; 3; 11 | | | | | | | | | | 8th | 78 |
| 2014 | Carlin | ROC; 1 | ROC; 2 | ROC; 3 | SIL; 1 | SIL; 2 | SIL; 3 | SNE; 1 | SNE; 2 | SNE; 3 | SPA; 1; 2 | SPA; 2; 3 | SPA; 3; 2 | THR; 1 | THR; 2 | THR; 3 | BRH; 1 | BRH; 2 | BRH; 3 | DON; 1 | DON; 2 | DON; 3 | NC† | 0 |

^{†} As Gelael was a guest driver, he was ineligible for points.

=== Complete FIA Formula 3 European Championship results ===
(key) (Races in bold indicate pole position) (Races in italics indicate fastest lap)

| Year | Entrant | 1 | 2 | 3 | 4 | 5 | 6 | 7 | 8 | 9 | 10 | 11 | 12 | 13 | 14 | 15 | 16 | 17 | 18 | 19 | 20 | 21 | 22 | 23 | 24 | 25 | 26 | 27 | 28 | 29 | 30 | 31 | 32 | 33 | DC | Points |
|---|---|---|---|---|---|---|---|---|---|---|---|---|---|---|---|---|---|---|---|---|---|---|---|---|---|---|---|---|---|---|---|---|---|---|---|---|
| 2013 | Double R Racing | MNZ; 1; 14 | MNZ; 2; 16 | MNZ; 3; 17 | SIL; 1; 24 | SIL; 2; 16 | SIL; 3; 18† | HOC; 1; 21 | HOC; 2; 27 | HOC; 3 Ret | BRH; 1; 23 | BRH; 2; 22 | BRH; 3 Ret | RBR; 1; 22 | RBR; 2; 17 | RBR; 3; 20† | NOR; 1 Ret | NOR; 2; 21 | NOR; 3; 15 | NÜR; 1; 20 | NÜR; 2; 18 | NÜR; 3; 13 | ZAN; 1; 17 | ZAN; 2; 20 | ZAN; 3; 20 | VAL; 1 Ret | VAL; 2; 21 | VAL; 3 Ret | HOC; 1; 25 | HOC; 2; 24 | HOC; 3; 13 | | | | 28th | 0 |
| 2014 | Jagonya Ayam with Carlin | SIL; 1; 15 | SIL; 2; 20 | SIL; 3 NC | HOC; 1; 13 | HOC; 2; 20 | HOC; 3; 22 | PAU; 1; 10 | PAU; 2 Ret | PAU; 3 Ret | HUN; 1; 10 | HUN; 2; 21 | HUN; 3; 13 | SPA; 1; 18 | SPA; 2; 13 | SPA; 3; 13 | NOR; 1; 9 | NOR; 2; 17 | NOR; 3; 6 | MSC; 1; 17 | MSC; 2; 17 | MSC; 3; 11 | RBR; 1; 12 | RBR; 2; 7 | RBR; 3; 10 | NÜR; 1; 16 | NÜR; 2; 21† | NÜR; 3; 11 | IMO; 1; 10 | IMO; 2; 16 | IMO; 3 Ret | HOC; 1; 10 | HOC; 2; 18 | HOC; 3; 8 | 18th | 25 |

^{†} Driver did not finish the race, but was classified as he completed over 90% of the race distance.

=== Complete Formula Renault 3.5 Series results ===
(key) (Races in bold indicate pole position) (Races in italics indicate fastest lap)

| Year | Team | 1 | 2 | 3 | 4 | 5 | 6 | 7 | 8 | 9 | 10 | 11 | 12 | 13 | 14 | 15 | 16 | 17 | Pos | Points |
|---|---|---|---|---|---|---|---|---|---|---|---|---|---|---|---|---|---|---|---|---|
| 2015 | Jagonya Ayam with Carlin | ALC; 1 Ret | ALC; 2; 15 | MON; 1; 8 | SPA; 1; 15 | SPA; 2; 12 | HUN; 1; 15 | HUN; 2 Ret | RBR; 1 Ret | RBR; 2 Ret | SIL; 1 Ret | SIL; 2; 10 | NÜR; 1; 15 | NÜR; 2; 16 | BUG; 1; 16 | BUG; 2; 17 | JER; 1; 16 | JER; 2; 9 | 19th | 7 |

=== Complete GP2 Series/FIA Formula 2 Championship results ===
(key) (Races in bold indicate pole position) (Races in italics indicate fastest lap)

| Year | Entrant | 1 | 2 | 3 | 4 | 5 | 6 | 7 | 8 | 9 | 10 | 11 | 12 | 13 | 14 | 15 | 16 | 17 | 18 | 19 | 20 | 21 | 22 | 23 | 24 | DC | Points |
|---|---|---|---|---|---|---|---|---|---|---|---|---|---|---|---|---|---|---|---|---|---|---|---|---|---|---|---|
| 2015 | Carlin | BHR; FEA | BHR; SPR | CAT; FEA | CAT; SPR | MON; FEA | MON; SPR | RBR; FEA | RBR; SPR | SIL; FEA | SIL; SPR | HUN; FEA; 18 | HUN; SPR; 20 | SPA; FEA; 20 | SPA; SPR; 21 | MNZ; FEA | MNZ; SPR | SOC; FEA; 19 | SOC; SPR; 21 | BHR; FEA; 23 | BHR; SPR; 15 | YMC; FEA; Ret | YMC; SPR; C | | | 30th | 0 |
| 2016 | Pertamina Campos Racing | CAT; FEA; 17 | CAT; SPR; 13 | MON; FEA; 13 | MON; SPR; Ret | BAK; FEA; 7 | BAK; SPR; Ret | RBR; FEA; 2 | RBR; SPR; Ret | SIL; FEA; 21 | SIL; SPR; 18 | HUN; FEA; 22 | HUN; SPR; 10 | HOC; FEA; Ret | HOC; SPR; Ret | SPA; FEA; 18 | SPA; SPR; 15 | MNZ; FEA; DSQ | MNZ; SPR; 16 | SEP; FEA; 16 | SEP; SPR; Ret | YMC; FEA; Ret | YMC; SPR; 21 | | | 15th | 24 |
| 2017 | Pertamina Arden | BHR; FEA; 17 | BHR; SPR; 17 | CAT; FEA; 15 | CAT; SPR; 16 | MON; FEA; 13 | MON; SPR; 12 | BAK; FEA; 14 | BAK; SPR; 10 | RBR; FEA; 10 | RBR; SPR; 11 | SIL; FEA; 9 | SIL; SPR; 16 | HUN; FEA; 14 | HUN; SPR; 10 | SPA; FEA; 15 | SPA; FEA; 17 | MNZ; FEA; 5 | MNZ; SPR; 6 | JER; FEA; 16 | JER; SPR; 16 | YMC; FEA; 15 | YMC; SPR; 14 | | | 15th | 17 |
| 2018 | Pertamina Prema Theodore Racing | BHR; FEA; 7 | BHR; SPR; 16 | BAK; FEA; 10 | BAK; SPR; Ret | CAT; FEA; Ret | CAT; SPR; 6 | MON; FEA; 2 | MON; SPR; Ret | LEC; FEA; Ret | LEC; SPR; 18 | RBR; FEA; 13 | RBR; SPR; Ret | SIL; FEA; Ret | SIL; SPR; 15 | HUN; FEA; 13 | HUN; SPR; 11 | SPA; FEA; 16 | SPA; SPR; Ret | MNZ; FEA; 11 | MNZ; SPR; Ret | SOC; FEA; DNS | SOC; SPR; 12 | YMC; FEA; 17 | YMC; SPR; Ret | 15th | 29 |
| 2019 | Prema Racing | BHR; FEA; Ret | BHR; SPR; 10 | BAK; FEA; 6 | BAK; SPR; 8 | CAT; FEA; 9 | CAT; SPR; 9 | MON; FEA; Ret | MON; SPR; 15 | LEC; FEA; Ret | LEC; SPR; 17 | RBR; FEA; 16 | RBR; SPR; 12 | SIL; FEA; WD | SIL; SPR; WD | HUN; FEA; 15 | HUN; SPR; 17 | SPA; FEA; C | SPA; SPR; C | MNZ; FEA; 9 | MNZ; SPR; Ret | SOC; FEA; 11 | SOC; SPR; 7 | YMC; FEA; 17 | YMC; SPR; Ret | 17th | 15 |
| 2020 | DAMS | RBR; FEA; Ret | RBR; SPR; Ret | RBR; FEA; 10 | RBR; SPR; 7 | HUN; FEA; 17 | HUN; SPR; 12 | SIL; FEA; 15 | SIL; SPR; Ret | SIL; FEA; Ret | SIL; SPR; DNS | CAT; FEA; 19† | CAT; SPR; DNS | SPA; FEA | SPA; SPR | MNZ; FEA | MNZ; SPR | MUG; FEA | MUG; SPR | SOC; FEA | SOC; SPR | BHR; FEA; 13 | BHR; SPR; 14 | BHR; FEA; 19 | BHR; SPR; 17 | 21st | 3 |

=== Complete Asian Le Mans Series results ===
| Year | Entrant | Class | Chassis | Engine | 1 | 2 | 3 | 4 | 5 | 6 | Rank | Points |
|---|---|---|---|---|---|---|---|---|---|---|---|---|
| 2015–16 | Jagonya Ayam with Eurasia | LMP2 | Oreca 03R | Nissan VK45DE 4.5 L V8 | FUJ | SEP1 | **BUR**; 1 | SEP2; 1 | | | 4th | 51 |
| 2021 | Jota | LMP2 | Oreca 07 | Gibson GK428 4.2 L V8 | DUB; 1; 2 | DUB; 2; 5 | ABU; 1; 1 | ABU; 2; 1 | | | 2nd | 78 |
| 2023–24 | Team Project 1 | GT | BMW M4 GT3 | BMW S58B30T0 3.0 L Turbo I6 | SEP; 1; 20 | SEP; 2; 18 | | | | | 19th | 12 |
| 2023–24 | Saintéloc Racing | GT | Audi R8 LMS Evo II | Audi DAR 5.2 L V10 | | | DUB; 1; 4 | ABU; 1 | ABU; 2 | | 19th | 12 |
| 2025–26 | AF Corse | GT | Ferrari 296 GT3 | Ferrari F163CE 3.0 L Turbo V6 | SEP; 1; 14 | SEP; 2; 4 | DUB; 1 Ret | DUB; 2; 14 | ABU; 1; 17 | ABU; 2; 5 | 15th | 22 |

=== Complete European Le Mans Series results ===
| Year | Entrant | Class | Chassis | Engine | 1 | 2 | 3 | 4 | 5 | 6 | Rank | Points |
|---|---|---|---|---|---|---|---|---|---|---|---|---|
| 2016 | SMP Racing | LMP2 | BR Engineering BR01 | Nissan VK45DE 4.5 L V8 | SIL; 5 | IMO | RBR | LEC | SPA | EST | 24th | 10 |
| 2021 | Jota Sport | LMP2 | Oreca 07 | Gibson GK428 4.2 L V8 | CAT | RBR | LEC | MNZ; 3 | SPA | ALG | NC† | 0† |

^{†} As Gelael was a guest driver, he was ineligible to score points.

=== Complete FIA World Endurance Championship results ===
| Year | Entrant | Class | Car | Engine | 1 | 2 | 3 | 4 | 5 | 6 | 7 | 8 | 9 | Rank | Points |
|---|---|---|---|---|---|---|---|---|---|---|---|---|---|---|---|
| 2016 | Extreme Speed Motorsports | LMP2 | Ligier JS P2 | Nissan VK45DE 4.5 L V8 | SIL | SPA | LMS | NÜR | MEX | COA | FUJ; 4 | SHA; 2 | BHR; 5 | 12th | 40 |
| 2021 | Jota Sport | LMP2 | Oreca 07 | Gibson GK428 4.2 L V8 | SPA; 3 | **ALG**; 2 | MNZ; 5 | LMS; 2 | **BHR**; 2 | BHR; 3 | | | | 2nd | 131 |
| 2022 | WRT | LMP2 | Oreca 07 | Gibson GK428 4.2 L V8 | SEB; 2 | SPA; 1 | **LMS**; Ret | MNZ; 12 | FUJ; 1 | BHR; 1 | | | | 2nd | 116 |
| 2023 | Team WRT | LMP2 | Oreca 07 | Gibson GK428 4.2 L V8 | SEB; 6 | ALG; 6 | SPA; 6 | LMS; 4 | MNZ; Ret | FUJ; 3 | BHR; 2 | | | 4th | 94 |
| 2024 | Team WRT | LMGT3 | BMW M4 GT3 | BMW P58 3.0 L I6 t | QAT; 6 | IMO; 1 | SPA; Ret | LMS; 2 | SÃO; 10 | COA; 5 | FUJ; 10 | BHR; 13 | | 4th | 85 |
| 2025 | United Autosports | LMGT3 | McLaren 720S GT3 Evo | McLaren M840T 4.0 L Turbo V8 | **QAT**; 7 | IMO; 9 | SPA; Ret | LMS; Ret | SÃO; 9 | COA; 1 | FUJ; 10 | BHR; 9 | | 11th | 43 |
| 2026 | Team WRT | LMGT3 | BMW M4 GT3 Evo | BMW P58 3.0 L I6 t | IMO; 5 | SPA; 14 | LMS; 7 | SÃO; 12 | COA; 16 | FUJ; 1 | CAT; 10 | MNZ; Ret | | 13th | 48 |

=== Complete Formula One participations ===
(key) (Races in bold indicate pole position; races in italics indicates fastest lap)

| Year | Entrant | Chassis | Engine | 1 | 2 | 3 | 4 | 5 | 6 | 7 | 8 | 9 | 10 | 11 | 12 | 13 | 14 | 15 | 16 | 17 | 18 | 19 | 20 | 21 | WDC | Points |
|---|---|---|---|---|---|---|---|---|---|---|---|---|---|---|---|---|---|---|---|---|---|---|---|---|---|---|
| 2017 | Scuderia Toro Rosso | Toro Rosso STR12 | Toro Rosso 1.6 V6 t | AUS | CHN | BHR | RUS | ESP | MON | CAN | AZE | AUT | GBR | HUN | BEL | ITA | SIN; TD | MAL; TD | JPN | USA; TD | MEX; TD | BRA | ABU | | – | – |
| 2018 | Red Bull Toro Rosso Honda | Toro Rosso STR13 | Honda RA618H 1.6 V6 t | AUS | BHR | CHN | AZE | ESP | MON | CAN | FRA | AUT | GBR | GER | HUN | BEL | ITA | SIN | RUS | JPN | USA; TD | MEX | BRA | ABU | – | – |

=== Complete 24 Hours of Le Mans results ===
| Year | Team | Co-Drivers | Car | Class | Laps | Pos. | Class Pos. |
|---|---|---|---|---|---|---|---|
| 2021 | (United Kingdom) Jota | (United Kingdom) Tom Blomqvist (Belgium) Stoffel Vandoorne | Oreca 07-Gibson | LMP2 | 363 | 7th | **2nd** |
| 2022 | (Belgium) Team WRT | (Netherlands) Robin Frijns (Germany) René Rast | Oreca 07-Gibson | LMP2 | 285 | DNF | DNF |
| 2023 | (Belgium) Team WRT | (Netherlands) Robin Frijns (Austria) Ferdinand Habsburg | Oreca 07-Gibson | LMP2 | 327 | 13th | 5th |
| 2024 | (Belgium) Team WRT | (Brazil) Augusto Farfus (United Kingdom) Darren Leung | BMW M4 GT3 | LMGT3 | 280 | 28th | **2nd** |
| 2025 | (United Kingdom) United Autosports | (United Kingdom) Darren Leung (Japan) Marino Sato | McLaren 720S GT3 Evo | LMGT3 | 80 | DNF | DNF |
| 2026 | (Belgium) Team WRT | (Brazil) Augusto Farfus (United Kingdom) Darren Leung | BMW M4 GT3 Evo | LMGT3 | 334 | 39th | 7th |

=== Complete GT World Challenge Europe results ===
==== GT World Challenge Europe Sprint Cup ====
| Year | Team | Car | Class | 1 | 2 | 3 | 4 | 5 | 6 | 7 | 8 | 9 | 10 | Pos. | Points |
|---|---|---|---|---|---|---|---|---|---|---|---|---|---|---|---|
| 2024 | Team WRT | BMW M4 GT3 | Silver | BRH; 1 | BRH; 2 | MIS; 1 | MIS; 2 | HOC; 1 | HOC; 2 | MAG; 1 | MAG; 2 | CAT; 1; 15 | CAT; 2; 14 | 14th | 18 |

==== GT World Challenge Europe Endurance Cup ====
| Year | Team | Car | Class | 1 | 2 | 3 | 4 | 5 | 6 | 7 | Pos. | Points |
|---|---|---|---|---|---|---|---|---|---|---|---|---|
| 2025 | Paradine Competition | BMW M4 GT3 Evo | Bronze | LEC; 27 | MNZ; 25 | SPA; 6H; 46 | SPA; 12H; 56 | SPA; 24H; Ret | NÜR; Ret | CAT; 26 | 7th | 46 |
| 2026 | AF Corse | Ferrari 296 GT3 Evo | Pro | LEC; 19 | MNZ; 11 | SPA; 6H; 22 | SPA; 12H; 12 | SPA; 24H; 5 | NÜR; 40 | ALG | 24th | 10 |

=== Complete GT World Challenge Asia results ===
(key) (Races in bold indicate pole position) (Races in italics indicate fastest lap)

| Year | Team | Car | 1 | 2 | 3 | 4 | 5 | 6 | 7 | 8 | 9 | 10 | 11 | 12 | Pos. | Points |
|---|---|---|---|---|---|---|---|---|---|---|---|---|---|---|---|---|
| 2026 | Garage 75 | Ferrari 296 GT3 | SEP; 1 | SEP; 2 | **MAN**; **1**; 3 | MAN; 2 Ret | SHA; 1 | SHA; 2 | FUJ; 1 | FUJ; 2 | OKA; 1 | OKA; 2 | BEI; 1 | BEI; 2 | 30th | 15 |
