= 2013 British Formula 3 International Series =

Open wheel racing series

Seasons
- ← 2012 2014 →

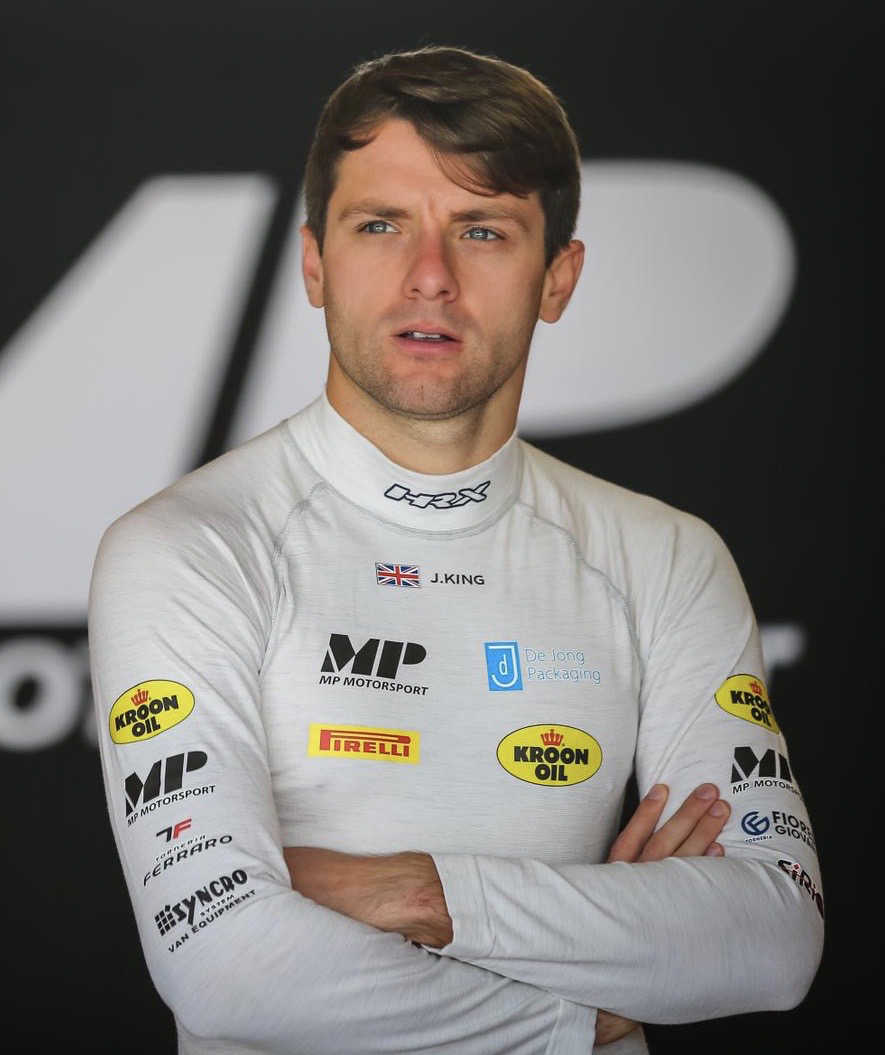
2013 Championship Class champion, Jordan King

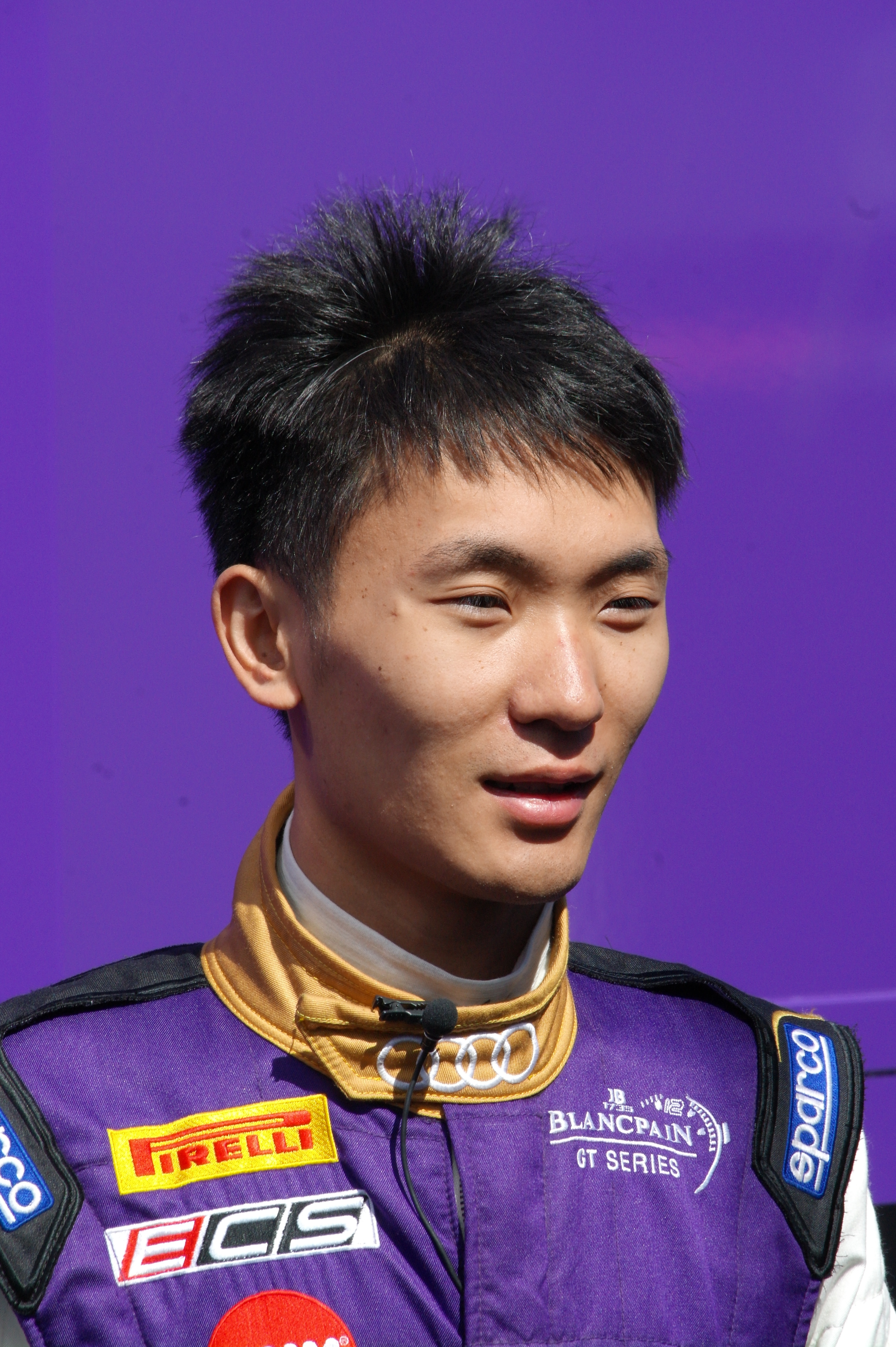
2013 National Class champion, Sun Zheng

The 2013 Cooper Tires British Formula 3 International Series season was the 63rd British Formula Three Championship season. The series, promoted by the Stéphane Ratel Organisation, began on 25 May at Silverstone and ended on 22 September at the Nürburgring after twelve races to be held at four meetings. The championship was won by Jordan King.

== Regulation changes ==
After all races awarded equal championship points during the 2012 season, the 2013 season saw the re-introduction of fewer points awarded to drivers in the second race. The first and third races awarded points using the same system as used in Formula One – with twenty-five points for the winner, down to one point for tenth place – with the reverse-grid race offering twelve points for the winner down to half a point for tenth place.

A five-race "mini-series" for older-specification Formula Three cars was also scheduled to be introduced for the 2013 season, after only two drivers competed in a full-season campaign in the Rookie class, in 2012. However, with the championship realignment in January 2013, older-specification cars were able to compete at every meeting.

== Drivers and teams ==
Team	Chassis	Engine	No.	Driver	Rounds
International Class
(United Kingdom) Carlin	Dallara F312	Volkswagen	1	(Canada) Nicholas Latifi	All
(United Kingdom) Carlin	Dallara F312	Volkswagen	2	(United Kingdom) Jordan King	All
(United Kingdom) Carlin	Dallara F312	Volkswagen	21	(United Kingdom) Jann Mardenborough	All
(United Kingdom) Carlin	Dallara F312	Volkswagen	22	(Malaysia) Jazeman Jaafar	3
(United Kingdom) Carlin	Dallara F312	Volkswagen	31	(China) Zhi Cong Li	3
(United Kingdom) Fortec Motorsport	Dallara F312	Mercedes HWA	3	(United Kingdom) William Buller	All
(United Kingdom) Fortec Motorsport	Dallara F312	Mercedes HWA	4	(Puerto Rico) Félix Serrallés	1
(United Kingdom) Fortec Motorsport	Dallara F312	Mercedes HWA	23	(Brazil) Felipe Guimarães	All
(United Kingdom) Fortec Motorsport	Dallara F312	Mercedes HWA	24	(Mexico) Alfonso Celis Jr.	4
(United Kingdom) Double R Racing	Dallara F312	Mercedes HWA	7	(Indonesia) Sean Gelael	All
(United Kingdom) Double R Racing	Dallara F312	Mercedes HWA	8	(Italy) Antonio Giovinazzi	All
(United Kingdom) Double R Racing	Dallara F312	Mercedes HWA	16	(Colombia) Tatiana Calderón	All
(United Kingdom) Threebond with T-Sport	Dallara F312	ThreeBond Nissan	15	(Australia) Spike Goddard	4
National Class
(United Kingdom) Team West-Tec F3	Dallara F312	Toyota	50	(Venezuela) Roberto La Rocca	1
(United Kingdom) Team West-Tec F3	Dallara F312	Toyota	53	(New Zealand) Chris Vlok	All
(United Kingdom) Team West-Tec F3	Dallara F312	Toyota	55	(China) Huan Zhu	1
(United Kingdom) Team West-Tec F3	Dallara F312	Toyota	58	(Australia) Jordan Oon	2
(United Kingdom) Team West-Tec F3	Dallara F312	Toyota	81	(United Kingdom) Ed Jones	1, 3
(United Kingdom) Team West-Tec F3	Dallara F308	Toyota	56	(Colombia) William Barbosa	4
(United Kingdom) Team West-Tec F3	Dallara F308	Toyota	66	(United Kingdom) Cameron Twynham	1, 3
(United Kingdom) Team West-Tec F3	Dallara F308	Toyota	77	(United Kingdom) Sean Walkinshaw	1
(United Kingdom) Team West-Tec F3	Dallara F308	Toyota	88	(South Africa) Liam Venter	1
(United Kingdom) CF Racing	Dallara F311	Mugen-Honda	87	(China) Sun Zheng	All
National B Class
(United Kingdom) Mark Bailey Racing	Dallara F306	Toyota	82	(United Kingdom) Alice Powell	1
Invitation Entries
(Sweden) Performance Racing Europe	Dallara F310-003	Volkswagen	51	(Sweden) John Bryant-Meisner	1

=== Driver changes ===
- Sun Zheng will join CF Racing for 2013 after competed China Touring Car Championship and Audi R8 LMS Cup in 2012 season.

== Race calendar and results ==
A provisional ten-round calendar was announced on 28 July 2012. This was later revised down to nine rounds – with series organisers SRO open to the addition of a tenth meeting – on 18 December 2012. In January 2013, SRO reduced the calendar yet further, to just four triple-header meetings; two events in the United Kingdom and two overseas, in Belgium and Germany.

Round		Circuit	Date	Pole position	Fastest lap	Winning driver	Winning team	National winner
1	R1	(United Kingdom) Silverstone Circuit	25 May	(Sweden) John Bryant-Meisner	(Canada) Nicholas Latifi (Note: Fastest lap recorded by John Bryant-Meisner, but he was ineligible to score the fastest lap point.)	(Sweden) John Bryant-Meisner	(Sweden) Performance Racing Europe	(United Kingdom) Ed Jones
1	R2	(United Kingdom) Silverstone Circuit	26 May		(United Kingdom) William Buller	(Italy) Antonio Giovinazzi	(United Kingdom) Double R Racing	(United Kingdom) Ed Jones
1	R3	(United Kingdom) Silverstone Circuit	26 May	(Sweden) John Bryant-Meisner	(United Kingdom) William Buller	(Sweden) John Bryant-Meisner	(Sweden) Performance Racing Europe	(United Kingdom) Ed Jones
2	R1	(Belgium) Circuit de Spa-Francorchamps	26 July	(Canada) Nicholas Latifi	(United Kingdom) William Buller	(United Kingdom) William Buller	(United Kingdom) Fortec Motorsports	(China) Sun Zheng
2	R2	(Belgium) Circuit de Spa-Francorchamps	26 July		(United Kingdom) William Buller	(United Kingdom) Jordan King	(United Kingdom) Carlin	(China) Sun Zheng
2	R3	(Belgium) Circuit de Spa-Francorchamps	27 July	(Canada) Nicholas Latifi	(Indonesia) Sean Gelael	(Italy) Antonio Giovinazzi	(United Kingdom) Double R Racing	(China) Sun Zheng
3	R1	(United Kingdom) Brands Hatch	10 August	(Malaysia) Jazeman Jaafar	(United Kingdom) William Buller	(Malaysia) Jazeman Jaafar	(United Kingdom) Carlin	(China) Sun Zheng
3	R2	(United Kingdom) Brands Hatch	11 August		(United Kingdom) William Buller	(Brazil) Felipe Guimarães	(United Kingdom) Fortec Motorsports	(United Kingdom) Ed Jones
3	R3	(United Kingdom) Brands Hatch	11 August	(Malaysia) Jazeman Jaafar	(United Kingdom) Jordan King	(Malaysia) Jazeman Jaafar	(United Kingdom) Carlin	(United Kingdom) Ed Jones
4	R1	(Germany) Nürburgring	21 September	(United Kingdom) Jordan King	(United Kingdom) Jordan King	(United Kingdom) Jordan King	(United Kingdom) Carlin	(China) Sun Zheng
4	R2	(Germany) Nürburgring	21 September		(Brazil) Felipe Guimarães	(Brazil) Felipe Guimarães	(United Kingdom) Fortec Motorsports	(New Zealand) Chris Vlok
4	R3	(Germany) Nürburgring	22 September	(United Kingdom) Jordan King	(United Kingdom) William Buller	(United Kingdom) Jordan King	(United Kingdom) Carlin	(China) Sun Zheng

== Championship standings ==
International class
Pos	Driver	SIL (United Kingdom)			SPA (Belgium)			BRH (United Kingdom)			NÜR (Germany)			Pts
1	(United Kingdom) Jordan King	Ret	6	2	2	1	3	2	4	2	1	5	1	176
2	(Italy) Antonio Giovinazzi	6	1	7	5	3	1	3	2	Ret	2	6	3	135
3	(United Kingdom) William Buller	2	2	3	1	2	7	6	9	12	13	Ret	2	134
4	(Brazil) Felipe Guimarães	3	8	6	Ret	7	5	7	1	4	3	1	7	109
5	(Canada) Nicholas Latifi	14	5	5	Ret	DNS	4	4	10	3	5	4	4	97
6	(United Kingdom) Jann Mardenborough	NC	10	4	Ret	6	2	5	5	5	4	Ret	6	85
7	(Colombia) Tatiana Calderón	5	7	9	4	4	6	8	7	7	6	3	8	79
8	(Indonesia) Sean Gelael	4	3	8	3	5	8	Ret	6	6	7	7	11	78
9	(Malaysia) Jazeman Jaafar							1	3	1				58
10	(Puerto Rico) Félix Serrallés	13	4	Ret										15
11	(Mexico) Alfonso Celis Jr.										9	8	5	15
12	(Australia) Spike Goddard										8	2	13	14
13	(China) Zhi Cong Li							11	12	10				7
Guest drivers ineligible for points
	(Sweden) John Bryant-Meisner	1	9	1										—
National Class
1	(China) Sun Zheng	8	15	11	6	8	9	9	11	Ret	10	10	9	205
2	(New Zealand) Chris Vlok	Ret	16	Ret	8	10	11	12	Ret	11	11	9	10	121
3	(United Kingdom) Ed Jones	7	11	10				Ret	8	8				103
4	(United Kingdom) Cameron Twynham	9	13	12				10	13	9				82
5	(Australia) Jordan Oon				7	9	10							45
6	(Colombia) William Barbosa										12	11	12	38
7	(Venezuela) Roberto La Rocca	10	12	13										33
8	(South Africa) Liam Venter	11	14	16										23
9	(United Kingdom) Sean Walkinshaw	15	17	14										20
10	(China) Huan Zhu	12	18	15										19
Guest drivers ineligible for points
	(United Kingdom) Alice Powell	Ret	19	17										—
Pos	Driver	SIL (United Kingdom)			SPA (Belgium)			BRH (United Kingdom)			NÜR (Germany)			Pts

Colour	Result
Gold	Winner
Silver	Second place
Bronze	Third place
Green	Points classification
Blue	Non-points classification
Blue	Non-classified finish (NC)
Purple	Retired, not classified (Ret)
Red	Did not qualify (DNQ)
Red	Did not pre-qualify (DNPQ)
Black	Disqualified (DSQ)
White	Did not start (DNS)
White	Withdrew (WD)
White	Race cancelled (C)
Blank	Did not practice (DNP)
Blank	Did not arrive (DNA)
Blank	Excluded (EX)
