= 2014 British Formula 3 International Series =

Seasons
- ← 2013 none →

The 2014 Cooper Tires British Formula 3 International Series season was a multi-event motor racing championship for open wheel, formula racing cars held across England, and one round in Belgium. The championship featured a mix of professional motor racing teams and privately funded drivers competing in 2 litre Formula Three single seat race cars that conformed to the technical regulations for the championship. The 2014 season was the 64th and final season British Formula Three Championship. The series, promoted by the Stéphane Ratel Organisation, began on 4 May at Rockingham Motor Speedway and concluded on 14 September at Donington Park after a 21 race schedule held at seven meetings.

In a season that saw only four drivers contest the entire championship, it was Chinese driver Martin Cao who won the championship, driving for Fortec Motorsports. Cao started the season with a run of seven successive second-place finishes to a series of drivers, but his consistent finishing kept him towards the top of the championship standings. Cao took his first win at Thruxton, and went on to take four overall wins – plus a further two class wins behind drivers who were ineligible to score championship points – in the final three race meetings, to ultimately win the championship title by two points, ahead of team-mate Matt Rao. Rao won five races over the course of the season, with one fewer podium finishes over the season, compared to Cao. Third place went to Camren Kaminsky, who took three podium finishes over his full season campaign.

Another Fortec driver, Sam MacLeod, finished fourth in the championship with four race victories, but he did not contest the whole campaign as his main focus for the season was in the German Formula Three championship with Van Amersfoort Racing. Marvin Kirchhöfer took two wins at Silverstone, when he was learning the circuit for the GP3 Series round at the circuit later in the season. Egor Orudzhev also won at Silverstone, while Roberto Merhi (two wins) and John Bryant-Meisner shared class victories at Spa-Francorchamps. Of the ineligible drivers, Ed Jones won all three races at Spa-Francorchamps, Santino Ferrucci won two out of three at Brands Hatch, while Sean Gelael finished second to Jones twice.

== Drivers and teams ==
Team	Chassis	Engine	No.	Driver	Rounds
(United Kingdom) Carlin	Dallara F308	Volkswagen	1	(China) Zhi Cong Li	All
(United Kingdom) Carlin	Dallara F308	Volkswagen	2	(United Kingdom) Alice Powell	1
(United Kingdom) Carlin	Dallara F308	Volkswagen	2	(Russia) Egor Orudzhev	2
(United Kingdom) Carlin	Dallara F308	Volkswagen	2	(United Kingdom) Sam MacLeod	4
(United Kingdom) Fortec Motorsport	Dallara F312	Mercedes HWA	3	(Germany) Marvin Kirchhöfer	2
(United Kingdom) Fortec Motorsport	Dallara F312	Mercedes HWA	7	(United Kingdom) Matt Rao	All
(United Kingdom) Fortec Motorsport	Dallara F312	Mercedes HWA	50	(United Kingdom) Sam MacLeod	1, 3
(United Kingdom) Fortec Motorsport	Dallara F312	Mercedes HWA	57	(China) Martin Cao	All
(United Kingdom) Double R Racing	Dallara F312	Mercedes HWA	8	(Macau) Wing Chung Chang	1–4
(United Kingdom) Double R Racing	Dallara F312	Mercedes HWA	9	(Spain) Roberto Merhi	4
(United Kingdom) Double R Racing	Dallara F312	Mercedes HWA	16	(United Kingdom) Dan Wells	6
(United Kingdom) Double R Racing	Dallara F312	Mercedes HWA	18	(United Kingdom) Max Marshall	5, 7
(United Kingdom) Double R Racing	Dallara F308	Mercedes HWA	18	(United Kingdom) Max Marshall	6
(United Kingdom) Double R Racing	Dallara F312	Mercedes HWA	34	(United States) Camren Kaminsky	All
(Italy) ADM Motorsport	Dallara F311	Volkswagen	10	(China) Kang Ling	4
(Italy) ADM Motorsport	Dallara F311	Volkswagen	72	(Russia) Nikita Zlobin	4
(Germany) Motopark	Dallara F311	Volkswagen	11	(Malaysia) Nabil Jeffri	4
(Germany) Motopark	Dallara F308	Volkswagen	24	(Netherlands) Indy Dontje	4
(Sweden) Performance Racing	Dallara F310	Volkswagen	12	(Sweden) John Bryant-Meisner	4
Invitation Entries
(United Kingdom) Fortec Motorsport	Dallara F312	Mercedes HWA	10	(United States) Santino Ferrucci	6
(United Kingdom) Carlin	Dallara F312	Volkswagen	20	(Indonesia) Sean Gelael	4
(United Kingdom) Carlin	Dallara F312	Volkswagen	21	(United Kingdom) Ed Jones	4

== Race calendar and results ==
A seven-round calendar was announced on 23 September 2013. In a change of direction from recent seasons, the championship held only a single round outside the UK, in Belgium, supporting the 2014 24 Hours of Spa. The remaining six rounds were all held in England. The three race format used in previous seasons was retained for all rounds of the championship.

After appearing on the 2013 calendar, the international round held at the Nürburgring was dropped from the 2014 calendar. Donington Park, Rockingham and Snetterton all returned to the calendar after a one-year hiatus, while Thruxton returned to the calendar for the first time since 2010.

Round		Circuit	Date	Pole position	Fastest lap	Winning driver	Winning team
1	R1	(United Kingdom) Rockingham Motor Speedway	4 May	(United Kingdom) Sam MacLeod	(United Kingdom) Sam MacLeod	(United Kingdom) Sam MacLeod	(United Kingdom) Fortec Motorsports
1	R2	(United Kingdom) Rockingham Motor Speedway	5 May		(United Kingdom) Sam MacLeod	(United Kingdom) Sam MacLeod	(United Kingdom) Fortec Motorsports
1	R3	(United Kingdom) Rockingham Motor Speedway	5 May	(United Kingdom) Sam MacLeod	(United Kingdom) Matt Rao	(United Kingdom) Matt Rao	(United Kingdom) Fortec Motorsports
2	R4	(United Kingdom) Silverstone Circuit	24 May	(China) Martin Cao	(Russia) Egor Orudzhev	(Russia) Egor Orudzhev	(United Kingdom) Carlin
2	R5	(United Kingdom) Silverstone Circuit	24 May		(Germany) Marvin Kirchhöfer	(Germany) Marvin Kirchhöfer	(United Kingdom) Fortec Motorsports
2	R6	(United Kingdom) Silverstone Circuit	25 May	(China) Martin Cao	(Germany) Marvin Kirchhöfer	(Germany) Marvin Kirchhöfer	(United Kingdom) Fortec Motorsports
3	R7	(United Kingdom) Snetterton Motor Racing Circuit	21 June	(United Kingdom) Sam MacLeod	(United Kingdom) Sam MacLeod	(United Kingdom) Sam MacLeod	(United Kingdom) Fortec Motorsports
3	R8	(United Kingdom) Snetterton Motor Racing Circuit	22 June		(United Kingdom) Sam MacLeod	(United Kingdom) Matt Rao	(United Kingdom) Fortec Motorsports
3	R9	(United Kingdom) Snetterton Motor Racing Circuit	22 June	(United Kingdom) Sam MacLeod	(United Kingdom) Sam MacLeod	(United Kingdom) Sam MacLeod	(United Kingdom) Fortec Motorsports
4	R10	(Belgium) Circuit de Spa-Francorchamps	25 July	(United Kingdom) Ed Jones	(Spain) Roberto Merhi (Note: Fastest lap recorded by Ed Jones, but he was ineligible to score the fastest lap point.)	(United Kingdom) Ed Jones	(United Kingdom) Carlin
4	R11	(Belgium) Circuit de Spa-Francorchamps	25 July		(Spain) Roberto Merhi	(United Kingdom) Ed Jones	(United Kingdom) Carlin
4	R12	(Belgium) Circuit de Spa-Francorchamps	26 July	(United Kingdom) Ed Jones	(Sweden) John Bryant-Meisner	(United Kingdom) Ed Jones	(United Kingdom) Carlin
5	R13	(United Kingdom) Thruxton Circuit	16 August	(United Kingdom) Matt Rao	(United Kingdom) Matt Rao	(China) Martin Cao	(United Kingdom) Fortec Motorsports
5	R14	(United Kingdom) Thruxton Circuit	17 August		(United Kingdom) Matt Rao	(China) Martin Cao	(United Kingdom) Fortec Motorsports
5	R15	(United Kingdom) Thruxton Circuit	17 August	(United Kingdom) Matt Rao	(United Kingdom) Matt Rao	(United Kingdom) Matt Rao	(United Kingdom) Fortec Motorsports
6	R16	(United Kingdom) Brands Hatch	30 August	(United States) Santino Ferrucci	(United Kingdom) Matt Rao (Note: Fastest lap recorded by Santino Ferrucci, but he was ineligible to score the fastest lap point.)	(United States) Santino Ferrucci	(United Kingdom) Fortec Motorsports
6	R17	(United Kingdom) Brands Hatch	31 August		(China) Martin Cao	(China) Martin Cao	(United Kingdom) Fortec Motorsports
6	R18	(United Kingdom) Brands Hatch	31 August	(China) Martin Cao	(United Kingdom) Matt Rao	(United States) Santino Ferrucci	(United Kingdom) Fortec Motorsports
7	R19	(United Kingdom) Donington Park	13 September	(China) Martin Cao	(United Kingdom) Matt Rao	(China) Martin Cao	(United Kingdom) Fortec Motorsports
7	R20	(United Kingdom) Donington Park	14 September		(United Kingdom) Matt Rao	(United Kingdom) Matt Rao	(United Kingdom) Fortec Motorsports
7	R21	(United Kingdom) Donington Park	14 September	(United Kingdom) Matt Rao	(United Kingdom) Matt Rao	(United Kingdom) Matt Rao	(United Kingdom) Fortec Motorsports

== Championship standings ==
Pos.	Driver	ROC (United Kingdom)			SIL (United Kingdom)			SNE (United Kingdom)			SPA (Belgium)			THR (United Kingdom)			BRH (United Kingdom)			DON (United Kingdom)			Pts
International Class
1	(China) Martin Cao	2	2	2	2	2	2	2	Ret	Ret	11	Ret	5	1	1	2	2	1	2	1	2	5	285
2	(United Kingdom) Matt Rao	Ret	4	1	5	Ret	3	3	1	3	8	6	4	2	2	1	4	2	3	3	1	1	283
3	(United States) Camren Kaminsky	4	5	4	6	Ret	4	4	Ret	4	12	8	13	Ret	5	3	6	5	5	4	3	3	161
4	(United Kingdom) Sam MacLeod	1	1	Ret				1	2	1	Ret	5	6										121
5	(China) Zhi Cong Li	Ret	7	5	7	3	Ret	5	Ret	5	9	Ret	9	3	3	5	7	6	Ret	5	4	4	118
6	(Macau) Wing Chung Chang	3	6	3	4	Ret	5	6	3	2	7	7	11										103
7	(United Kingdom) Max Marshall													4	4	4	5	Ret	6	2	5	2	93
8	(Germany) Marvin Kirchhöfer				3	1	1																54
9	(Sweden) John Bryant-Meisner										4	4	3										53
10	(United Kingdom) Dan Wells																3	4	4				41
11	(Spain) Roberto Merhi										3	2	DNS										39
12	(Russia) Egor Orudzhev				1	Ret	Ret																26
13	(Netherlands) Indy Dontje										5	DSQ	7										23
14	(Malaysia) Nabil Jeffri										6	DSQ	8										18
15	(United Kingdom) Alice Powell	5	3	Ret																			16
16	(Russia) Nikita Zlobin										10	Ret	10										6
17	(China) Kang Ling										13	9	12										5
Guest drivers ineligible for points
	(United Kingdom) Ed Jones										1	1	1										—
	(United States) Santino Ferrucci																1	3	1				—
	(Indonesia) Sean Gelael										2	3	2										—
Pos.	Driver	ROC (United Kingdom)			SIL (United Kingdom)			SNE (United Kingdom)			SPA (Belgium)			THR (United Kingdom)			BRH (United Kingdom)			DON (United Kingdom)			Pts

Colour	Result
Gold	Winner
Silver	Second place
Bronze	Third place
Green	Points classification
Blue	Non-points classification
Blue	Non-classified finish (NC)
Purple	Retired, not classified (Ret)
Red	Did not qualify (DNQ)
Red	Did not pre-qualify (DNPQ)
Black	Disqualified (DSQ)
White	Did not start (DNS)
White	Withdrew (WD)
White	Race cancelled (C)
Blank	Did not practice (DNP)
Blank	Did not arrive (DNA)
Blank	Excluded (EX)
