= Sun Zheng =

Chinese racing driver

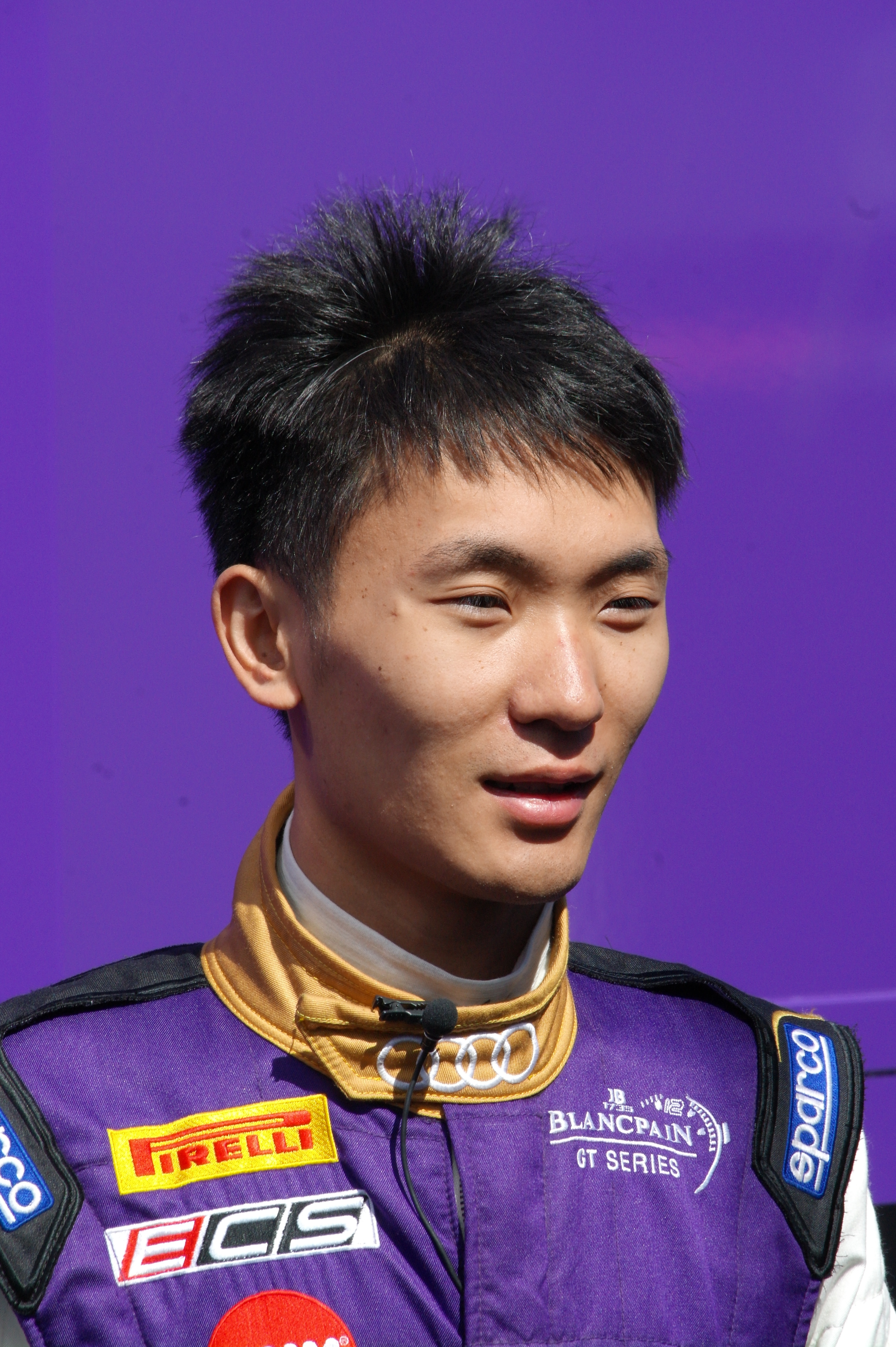
Sun Zheng at the Silverstone round of the 2014 Blancpain Endurance Series season.

Sun Zheng (孫正) is a Chinese racing driver. He won the national class of the British Formula Three Championship when chief rival Ed Jones decided against racing in the final round at the Nurburgring.

== Career ==
Sun was the 2012 China Formula Grand Prix series champion and finished fourth overall in 2012 Audi R8 LMS Cup.

Sun competed in the 2013 Macau Grand Prix, driving for Galaxy Double R Racing. He is the first F3 racer from mainland China to enter the race.

=== Complete Formula Renault 2.0 Alps Series results ===
(key) (Races in bold indicate pole position; races in italics indicate fastest lap)

Year	Team	1	2	3	4	5	6	7	8	9	10	11	12	13	14	Pos	Points
2014	China BRT by JCS	IMO; 1 DNS	IMO; 2 DNS	PAU; 1	PAU; 2	RBR; 1	RBR; 2	SPA; 1; 16	SPA; 2; 20	MNZ; 1 Ret	MNZ; 2; 17	MUG; 1	MUG; 2	JER; 1	JER; 2	30th	0
