= 2018 United States Grand Prix =

Race 18 of 21 in the 2018 Formula One World Championship
← Previous race	Next race →
- Layout of the Circuit of the Americas

Race details
- Date: October 21, 2018
- Official name: Formula 1 Pirelli 2018 United States Grand Prix
- Location: Circuit of the Americas; Austin, Texas, United States
- Course: Permanent racing facility
- Course length: 5.513 km (3.426 miles)
- Distance: 56 laps, 308.405 km (191.634 miles)
- Weather: Partly cloudy

Pole position
Driver	(United Kingdom) Lewis Hamilton	Mercedes
- Time: 1:32.237

Fastest lap
Driver	(United Kingdom) Lewis Hamilton	Mercedes
- Time: 1:37.392 on lap 40

Podium
First	(Finland) Kimi Räikkönen	Ferrari
Second	(Netherlands) Max Verstappen	Red Bull Racing-TAG Heuer
Third	(United Kingdom) Lewis Hamilton	Mercedes

The 2018 United States Grand Prix (officially known as the Formula 1 Pirelli 2018 United States Grand Prix) was a Formula One motor race held on October 21, 2018, at the Circuit of the Americas in Austin, Texas. It served as the eighteenth round of the 2018 Formula One World Championship and marked the seventh running of the United States Grand Prix at this circuit.

Kimi Räikkönen won the race after starting from second place on the grid, earning his first Grand Prix win since the 2013 Australian Grand Prix and ending a record 114-race winless streak. (Note: 114 Grands Prix took place between the 2013 Australian Grand Prix and this race. Räikkönen started 111 of these, as he was forced to miss the 2013 United States and Brazilian Grands Prix to undergo back surgery, and entered but did not start the 2017 Malaysian Grand Prix, due to a power unit issue.) It was his first victory with Ferrari since the 2009 Belgian Grand Prix, as well as the team's first win in the United States since 2006. The race would be the final victory of Räikkönen's F1 career, and was Ferrari's most recent win in the United States until the 2024 United States Grand Prix.

== Background ==
Mercedes driver Lewis Hamilton entered the round with a 67-point lead over Ferrari's Sebastian Vettel in the World Drivers' Championship, having widened his advantage in the championship considerably by winning the previous four races. He was eligible to secure the Drivers' Championship at this race if he outscored Vettel by a minimum of eight points. Hamilton's teammate, Valtteri Bottas, was third in the championship, 57 points behind Vettel. In the World Constructors' Championship, Mercedes held a lead of 78 points over Ferrari, with Red Bull Racing a further 141 points behind in third place.

Hamilton entered the weekend holding the record for the most Formula One wins at the Circuit of the Americas, having won five of the six races held at the track. He was vying to become the second driver to win a Grand Prix five years in a row, after Ayrton Senna, who won the Monaco Grand Prix every year between 1989 and 1993. Hamilton and Vettel were the only drivers on the grid for the 2018 race that had previously won the United States Grand Prix. While Hamilton had won more races, Vettel had taken the fastest lap at all but one F1 event at the track.

Lando Norris and Sean Gelael drove in the first practice session instead of Stoffel Vandoorne and Brendon Hartley for McLaren and Toro Rosso respectively. Nicholas Latifi was supposed to drive in the same session in place of Esteban Ocon at Force India, but this plan was cancelled ahead of the session. This race was the first time Charles Leclerc, Sergey Sirotkin, and Pierre Gasly had driven at the track.

The Circuit of the Americas was one of five tracks in the 2018 F1 calendar to run in an anticlockwise format. The track has a mainly smooth surface with two drag reduction system (DRS) zones, and for the 2018 race, new kerbs were installed at turns 16 and 17 along with new bumps at turn 1. Sole tyre supplier Pirelli brought the soft, supersoft and ultrasoft tyres for use at the event; the same as the previous year.

== Free practice ==
The first free practice session (FP1) began under rainy conditions, at 16:00 local time. Lewis Hamilton was fastest, setting a lap time over a second quicker than the second-placed driver, his teammate Valtteri Bottas. Ferrari used the session to test a floor upgrade, and resulting struggles meant Sebastian Vettel and Kimi Räikkönen placed fifth and sixth, behind the two Red Bulls. Lando Norris replaced Stoffel Vandoorne for McLaren and placed twelfth, two-tenths of a second behind Vandoorne's teammate Fernando Alonso. Toro Rosso's Brendon Hartley was replaced by Sean Gelael, who placed twentieth by a margin of eight-tenths. The session was briefly red-flagged when Charles Leclerc ran off the track into the gravel; Vettel was later given a three-place grid penalty for failing to slow sufficiently for the red flags.

The second session of free practice (FP2), scheduled to begin at 19:00, was delayed by 45 minutes because of heavy rain. Hartley, returning for FP2, was the first driver to leave his garage, followed soon after by Vandoorne. Most of the grid only completed a handful of laps, and five drivers (Carlos Sainz, Daniel Ricciardo, Romain Grosjean, Kevin Magnussen, and Valtteri Bottas) did not set a time. Hamilton was quickest again, over a second ahead of Pierre Gasly of Toro Rosso in second.

Ferrari were fastest in the third free practice session (FP3), which took place at 19:00 the next day under dry conditions. Vettel led the field ahead of Räikkönen, who was closely followed by Hamilton—the top three were separated by only seventy-three thousandths of a second. Bottas was behind them, and the two Red Bulls were fifth and sixth. FP3 was the only practice session of the weekend during which all race drivers set lap times.

== Qualifying ==
Qualifying began at 16:00 local time on October 20 and consisted of three sessions lasting 18, 15, and 12 minutes, with five drivers being eliminated in each of the first two sessions. Both McLarens were eliminated in the first qualifying session (Q1) for the third consecutive race, along with the two Williams drivers and Sauber's Marcus Ericsson. Max Verstappen placed third in Q1, but was forced to end his qualifying early after an impact with a kerb damaged his car's suspension.

Only twelve of the eligible fifteen cars participated in the second qualifying session (Q2). Pierre Gasly and Brendon Hartley of Toro Rosso had chosen to fit new power units for the race, thereby incurring grid penalties that would start them from the back of the grid regardless of their qualifying position. They did not set a time in Q2. As a result of his suspension damage in Q1, Verstappen was unable to participate in the session and also did not set a time. Therefore, only two cars were eliminated on track—the Haas of Kevin Magnussen and the Renault of Carlos Sainz, the latter of whom missed out on Q3 by two-thousandths of a second.

Lewis Hamilton took pole position in Q3, narrowly ahead of Sebastian Vettel and Kimi Räikkönen. Six-hundredths of a second separated the top three, while Valtteri Bottas qualified in fourth, three-tenths behind Räikkönen. Daniel Ricciardo and Esteban Ocon were fifth and sixth, and Nico Hülkenberg placed seventh—his joint-best qualifying result of the season. Romain Grosjean, Charles Leclerc, and Sergio Pérez completed the top ten.

As grid penalties are only applied after qualifying is complete, the final grid order was different from the qualifying classification. Vettel was penalised three places after failing to slow for red flags in FP1; he moved from second to fifth on the starting grid. Verstappen was given a five-place grid penalty for an unscheduled gearbox change. Gasly and Hartley both received 35-place grid penalties for using more than the maximum number of power units allowed. Hartley was also penalised a further five places for an unscheduled gearbox change.

=== Qualifying classification ===
Pos.	No.	Driver	Constructor	Qualifying times			Final grid
Pos.	No.	Driver	Constructor	Q1	Q2	Q3	Final grid
1	44	(United Kingdom) Lewis Hamilton	Mercedes	1:34.130	1:33.480	1:32.237	1
2	5	(Germany) Sebastian Vettel	Ferrari	1:34.569	1:33.079	1:32.298	5^{a}
3	7	(Finland) Kimi Räikkönen	Ferrari	1:34.703	1:32.884	1:32.307	2
4	77	(Finland) Valtteri Bottas	Mercedes	1:34.518	1:33.702	1:32.616	3
5	3	(Australia) Daniel Ricciardo	Red Bull Racing-TAG Heuer	1:34.755	1:34.185	1:33.494	4
6	31	(France) Esteban Ocon	Racing Point Force India-Mercedes	1:34.876	1:34.522	1:34.145	6
7	27	(Germany) Nico Hülkenberg	Renault	1:34.932	1:34.564	1:34.215	7
8	8	(France) Romain Grosjean	Haas-Ferrari	1:34.892	1:34.419	1:34.250	8
9	16	(Monaco) Charles Leclerc	Sauber-Ferrari	1:35.069	1:34.255	1:34.420	9
10	11	(Mexico) Sergio Pérez	Racing Point Force India-Mercedes	1:35.193	1:34.525	1:34.594	10
11	55	(Spain) Carlos Sainz Jr.	Renault	1:34.891	1:34.566		11
12	20	(Denmark) Kevin Magnussen	Haas-Ferrari	1:34.972	1:34.732		12
13	10	(France) Pierre Gasly	Scuderia Toro Rosso-Honda	1:34.850	No time		19^{b}
14	28	(New Zealand) Brendon Hartley	Scuderia Toro Rosso-Honda	1:35.206	No time		20^{c}
15	33	(Netherlands) Max Verstappen	Red Bull Racing-TAG Heuer	1:34.766	No time		18^{d}
16	14	(Spain) Fernando Alonso	McLaren-Renault	1:35.294			13
17	35	(Russia) Sergey Sirotkin	Williams-Mercedes	1:35.362			14
18	18	(Canada) Lance Stroll	Williams-Mercedes	1:35.480			15
19	9	(Sweden) Marcus Ericsson	Sauber-Ferrari	1:35.536			16
20	2	(Belgium) Stoffel Vandoorne	McLaren-Renault	1:35.735			17
107% time: 1:40.719

Notes

- ^a – Sebastian Vettel received a three-place grid penalty for failing to slow sufficiently during a red flag period in Free Practice 1.
- ^b – Pierre Gasly received a 35-place grid penalty for exceeding his quota of power unit elements.
- ^c – Brendon Hartley received a 40-place grid penalty: 35 places for exceeding his quota of power unit elements and 5 places for an unscheduled gearbox change.
- ^d – Max Verstappen received a five-place grid penalty for an unscheduled gearbox change.

== Race ==
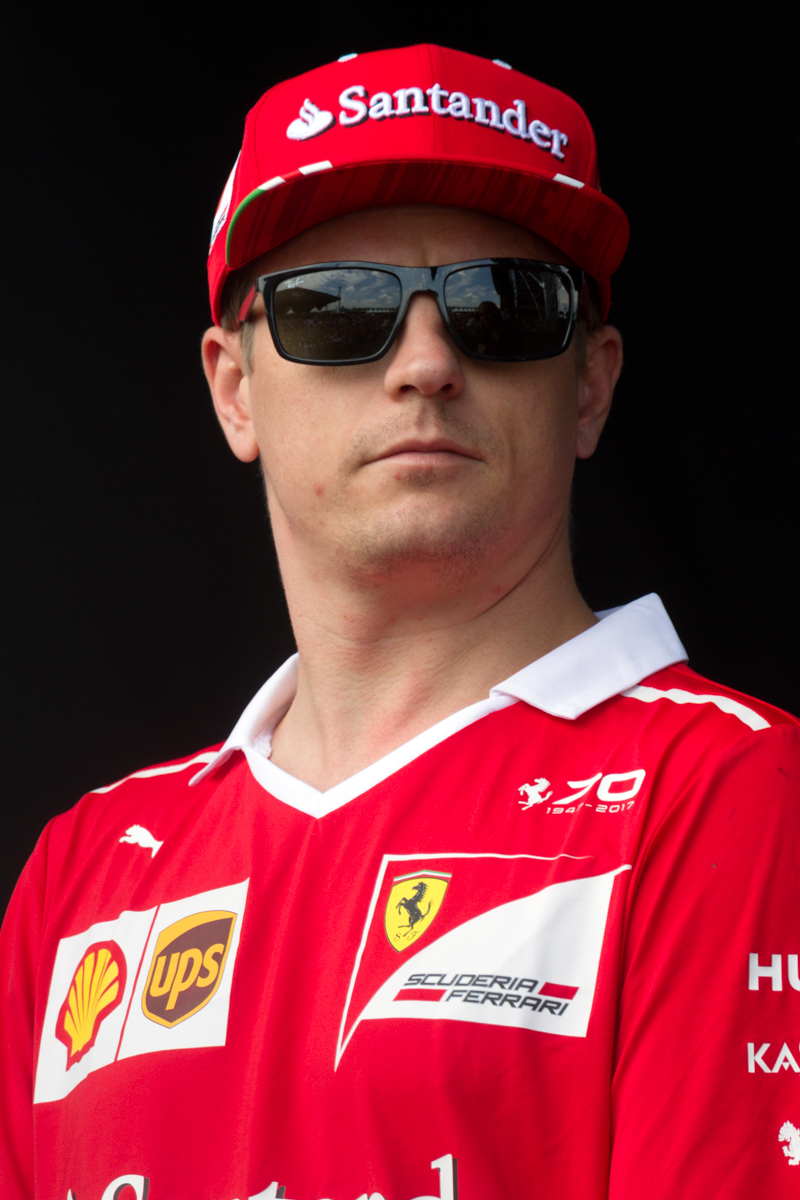
Kimi Räikkönen (pictured in 2017) won what would be the final victory of his Formula One career, after starting from second on the grid.

The race began at 13:10 local time on October 21 and lasted for 56 laps. Lewis Hamilton started the on pole position, but was overtaken before the first corner by Kimi Räikkönen, who was on softer tyres. A chaotic start saw multiple early collisions, with yellow flags waved for a first-lap incident between Lance Stroll and Fernando Alonso, the latter of whom was forced to retire with chassis damage. Stroll was handed a five-second drive-through penalty for causing the crash. Further up the grid, Romain Grosjean braked early while challenging Esteban Ocon, locking up and driving into Charles Leclerc. Grosjean retired his car, and was later given one penalty point and a three-place grid drop at the next race for his role in the incident.

Sebastian Vettel was also impacted on lap one, being spun by Daniel Ricciardo while competing for fourth position. His spin dropped him to fifteenth, boosting Hamilton's chances of securing the Drivers' Championship at the end of the race. Räikkönen was able to maintain his lead over Hamilton through the first lap; the first time he had gained a position on the opening lap of a Grand Prix since the 2016 Abu Dhabi Grand Prix.

On lap eight, Ricciardo retired with a power unit failure, causing the Virtual Safety Car to be deployed. Hamilton pitted under the safety car on lap 11, allowing him to swap tyres with less time lost to Räikkönen, who was instructed by the Ferrari pit wall to stay out. Räikkönen led the race from the resumption of racing until he entered the pit lane on lap 21, giving Hamilton the lead and rejoining the race in second. Max Verstappen, having fought his way up the field after starting eighteenth, undercut Valtteri Bottas for third position with a stop on lap 23; Bottas pitted a lap later. Following his early spin, Vettel had managed to return near to the top of the grid and pitted on lap 27, emerging fifth behind Hamilton, Räikkönen, Verstappen, and Bottas. Leclerc retired to the pits on lap 31, as a result of the damage sustained from his earlier collision with Grosjean.

Hamilton was eventually forced to make a second stop on lap 38 due to tyre wear, surrendering his lead and rejoining the race in fourth, ahead of Vettel. He overtook Bottas soon after his stop, but was unable to find a way past Verstappen, who defended aggressively. By lap 54, Hamilton was side-by-side with Verstappen, but ran wide at turn 18 with just over one lap left. On the penultimate lap, Vettel capitalised on Bottas' tyre wear, taking fourth position as the Mercedes driver ran wide at turn 12.

Räikkönen crossed the line first, having successfully orchestrated a one-stop strategy. Hamilton was unable to complete his overtake and finished behind Verstappen, who took second. Vettel and Bottas finished fourth and fifth, followed by the Renaults of Nico Hülkenberg and Carlos Sainz over a minute behind. Esteban Ocon, Kevin Magnussen, and Sergio Pérez rounded out the top ten.

=== Post-race ===
By winning, Räikkönen ended his record 114-race winless streak which had lasted since the 2013 Australian Grand Prix and included 14 second-place finishes. On his cooldown lap, Räikkönen thanked his engineers over the radio, noting his wait for the win with "fucking finally". In the post-race media conference, he was characteristically reserved, remarking "it doesn't change my life one bit" and that the victory "hadn't really been a big deal", but that he was pleased to have improved the record of his second Ferrari stint and delivered a win for the team.

Hamilton expressed his surprise and frustration at Mercedes' performance, saying they "made it so hard for [them]selves", and that he did not fully understand the team's race strategy. He pointed to the early first pit stop as being the source of his difficulties and that "once we had done a stop on [lap] 11, we knew that we would be doing a two stop", but praised Räikkönen's winning drive. Mercedes team principal Toto Wolff was also skeptical of the team's strategy and said it required them to "rethink whether [they] could have done something better".

Vettel was disappointed with his race, apologising for "letting the team down" and saying he "had the speed to win", but that he did not blame Ricciardo for the first-lap collision, which was later deemed a racing incident by the stewards. Sky Sports F1 commentator Martin Brundle was critical of Vettel's performance and said he "seems to be on the receiving end of contact every single time he gets into a squabble" and that he had "forgotten how to do wheel-to-wheel combat". Vettel's recovery from the spin and fifth-place finish meant that Hamilton only outscored him by three points (out of a necessary eight), extending the fight for the Drivers' Championship to the next race, the Mexican Grand Prix, where Hamilton eventually secured his fifth title with a fourth-place finish.

Two hours after the race had ended, Ocon and Kevin Magnussen were disqualified for fuel-related breaches of the technical regulations. Ocon's car was found to have exceeded the maximum fuel flow rate on the first lap, and Magnussen had exceeded the 105 kg fuel limit for the race. Their disqualifications meant all drivers finishing below them were promoted two places; Sergio Pérez was reclassified eighth, and Brendon Hartley and Marcus Ericsson were ninth and tenth, the latter two moving into the points after having finished outside them on track.

=== Race classification ===
Pos.	No.	Driver	Constructor	Laps	Time/Retired	Grid	Points
1	7	(Finland) Kimi Räikkönen	Ferrari	56	1:34:18.643	2	25
2	33	(Netherlands) Max Verstappen	Red Bull Racing-TAG Heuer	56	+1.281	18	18
3	44	(United Kingdom) Lewis Hamilton	Mercedes	56	+2.342	1	15
4	5	(Germany) Sebastian Vettel	Ferrari	56	+18.222	5	12
5	77	(Finland) Valtteri Bottas	Mercedes	56	+24.744	3	10
6	27	(Germany) Nico Hülkenberg	Renault	56	+1:27.210	7	8
7	55	(Spain) Carlos Sainz Jr.	Renault	56	+1:34.994	11	6
8	11	(Mexico) Sergio Pérez	Racing Point Force India-Mercedes	56	+1:41.080	10	4
9	28	(New Zealand) Brendon Hartley	Scuderia Toro Rosso-Honda	55	+1 lap	20	2
10	9	(Sweden) Marcus Ericsson	Sauber-Ferrari	55	+1 lap	16	1
11	2	(Belgium) Stoffel Vandoorne	McLaren-Renault	55	+1 lap	17	
12	10	(France) Pierre Gasly	Scuderia Toro Rosso-Honda	55	+1 lap	19	
13	35	(Russia) Sergey Sirotkin	Williams-Mercedes	55	+1 lap	14	
14	18	(Canada) Lance Stroll	Williams-Mercedes	54	+2 laps	15	
Ret	16	(Monaco) Charles Leclerc	Sauber-Ferrari	31	Collision damage	9	
Ret	3	(Australia) Daniel Ricciardo	Red Bull Racing-TAG Heuer	8	Battery	4	
Ret	8	(France) Romain Grosjean	Haas-Ferrari	2	Collision	8	
Ret	14	(Spain) Fernando Alonso	McLaren-Renault	1	Collision	13	
DSQ	31	(France) Esteban Ocon	Racing Point Force India-Mercedes	56	Fuel^{1}	6	
DSQ	20	(Denmark) Kevin Magnussen	Haas-Ferrari	56	Fuel^{2}	12	

Notes

- ^1 – Esteban Ocon originally finished eighth, but was disqualified for exceeding fuel flow limits on lap 1.
- ^2 – Kevin Magnussen originally finished ninth, but was disqualified for consuming more than 105 kg of fuel during the race.

== Championship standings after the race ==
Drivers' Championship standings

	Pos.	Driver	Points
	1	(United Kingdom) Lewis Hamilton*	346
	2	(Germany) Sebastian Vettel*	276
1	3	(Finland) Kimi Räikkönen	221
1	4	(Finland) Valtteri Bottas	217
	5	(Netherlands) Max Verstappen	191

Constructors' Championship standings

Pos.	Constructor	Points
1	(Germany) Mercedes*	563
2	(Italy) Ferrari*	497
3	(Austria) Red Bull Racing-TAG Heuer	337
4	(France) Renault	106
5	(United States) Haas-Ferrari	84

- Note: Only the top five positions are included for both sets of standings.
- Bold text and an asterisk indicates competitors who still had a theoretical chance of becoming World Champion.

== Notes ==
Previous race: 2018 Japanese Grand Prix	FIA Formula One World Championship; 2018 season	Next race: 2018 Mexican Grand Prix
Previous race: 2017 United States Grand Prix	United States Grand Prix	Next race: 2019 United States Grand Prix
