= 2018 Mexican Grand Prix =

19th round of the 2018 Formula One season

Race 19 of 21 in the 2018 Formula One World Championship
| ← Previous race | Next race → |

Race details
- Date: 28 October 2018
- Official name: Formula 1 Gran Premio de México 2018
- Location: Autódromo Hermanos Rodríguez, Mexico City, Mexico
- Course: Permanent racing facility
- Course length: 4.304 km (2.674 miles)
- Distance: 71 laps, 305.354 km (189.738 miles)
- Weather: Sunny
- Attendance: 334,946

Pole position
| Driver | (Australia) Daniel Ricciardo | Red Bull Racing-TAG Heuer |
- Time: 1:14.759

Fastest lap
| Driver | (Finland) Valtteri Bottas | Mercedes |
- Time: 1:18.741 on lap 65

Podium
| First | (Netherlands) Max Verstappen | Red Bull Racing-TAG Heuer |
| Second | (Germany) Sebastian Vettel | Ferrari |
| Third | (Finland) Kimi Räikkönen | Ferrari |

The 2018 Mexican Grand Prix (formally known as the Formula 1 Gran Premio de México 2018) was a Formula One motor race held on 28 October 2018 at the Autódromo Hermanos Rodríguez in Mexico City. The race was the nineteenth round of the 2018 Formula One World Championship and marked the 20th running of the Mexican Grand Prix, and the 19th time that the race had been run as a World Championship event since the inaugural season in 1950.

Mercedes driver Lewis Hamilton entered the round with a 70-point lead over Ferrari's Sebastian Vettel in the World Drivers' Championship. Vettel's team-mate, Kimi Räikkönen, was in third, a further 55 points behind. In the World Constructors' Championship, Mercedes held a lead of 66 points over Ferrari, with Red Bull Racing a further 160 points behind in third place.

The race was won by Max Verstappen (his second win of the season), while Lewis Hamilton finished in fourth position, thereby taking his fifth Drivers' World Championship.

== Qualifying ==
Daniel Ricciardo took pole position from teammate Verstappen and with Hamilton in third. This was Ricciardo's last pole position.

=== Qualifying classification ===
| Pos. | No. | Driver | Constructor | Qualifying times | | | Final grid |
| Pos. | No. | Driver | Constructor | Q1 | Q2 | Q3 | Final grid |
|---|---|---|---|---|---|---|---|
| 1 | 3 | (Australia) Daniel Ricciardo | Red Bull Racing-TAG Heuer | 1:15.866 | 1:15.845 | 1:14.759 | 1 |
| 2 | 33 | (Netherlands) Max Verstappen | Red Bull Racing-TAG Heuer | 1:15.756 | 1:15.640 | 1:14.785 | 2 |
| 3 | 44 | (United Kingdom) Lewis Hamilton | Mercedes | 1:15.673 | 1:15.644 | 1:14.894 | 3 |
| 4 | 5 | (Germany) Sebastian Vettel | Ferrari | 1:16.089 | 1:15.715 | 1:14.970 | 4 |
| 5 | 77 | (Finland) Valtteri Bottas | Mercedes | 1:15.580 | 1:15.923 | 1:15.160 | 5 |
| 6 | 7 | (Finland) Kimi Räikkönen | Ferrari | 1:16.446 | 1:15.996 | 1:15.330 | 6 |
| 7 | 27 | (Germany) Nico Hülkenberg | Renault | 1:16.498 | 1:16.126 | 1:15.827 | 7 |
| 8 | 55 | (Spain) Carlos Sainz Jr. | Renault | 1:16.813 | 1:16.188 | 1:16.084 | 8 |
| 9 | 16 | (Monaco) Charles Leclerc | Sauber-Ferrari | 1:16.862 | 1:16.320 | 1:16.189 | 9 |
| 10 | 9 | (Sweden) Marcus Ericsson | Sauber-Ferrari | 1:16.701 | 1:16.633 | 1:16.513 | 10 |
| 11 | 31 | (France) Esteban Ocon | Racing Point Force India-Mercedes | 1:16.252 | 1:16.844 | N/A | 11 |
| 12 | 14 | (Spain) Fernando Alonso | McLaren-Renault | 1:16.857 | 1:16.871 | N/A | 12 |
| 13 | 11 | (Mexico) Sergio Pérez | Racing Point Force India-Mercedes | 1:16.242 | 1:17.167 | N/A | 13 |
| 14 | 28 | (New Zealand) Brendon Hartley | Scuderia Toro Rosso-Honda | 1:16.682 | 1:17.184 | N/A | 14 |
| 15 | 10 | (France) Pierre Gasly | Scuderia Toro Rosso-Honda | 1:16.828 | No time | N/A | 20^{a} |
| 16 | 8 | (France) Romain Grosjean | Haas-Ferrari | 1:16.911 | N/A | N/A | 18^{b} |
| 17 | 2 | (Belgium) Stoffel Vandoorne | McLaren-Renault | 1:16.966 | N/A | N/A | 15 |
| 18 | 20 | (Denmark) Kevin Magnussen | Haas-Ferrari | 1:17.599 | N/A | N/A | 16 |
| 19 | 18 | (Canada) Lance Stroll | Williams-Mercedes | 1:17.689 | N/A | N/A | 17 |
| 20 | 35 | (Russia) Sergey Sirotkin | Williams-Mercedes | 1:17.886 | N/A | N/A | 19 |
107% time: 1:20.870

Notes

- ^a – Pierre Gasly received a 20-place grid penalty: 15 places for exceeding his quota of power unit elements and 5 places for an unscheduled gearbox change.
- ^b – Romain Grosjean received a three-place grid penalty for causing a collision in the previous round.

== Race ==
Max Verstappen won the race after taking the lead on lap 1, his teammate Ricciardo bogged down badly at the start. The two Ferraris of Vettel and Räikkönen completed the podium. Lewis Hamilton's fourth-place finish was enough for him to claim the 2018 World Drivers' Championship with two rounds to go. Pole sitter Ricciardo retired on lap 61, his eighth retirement of the year. Nico Hülkenberg finished a fine 6th place ahead of Charles Leclerc, while Stoffel Vandoorne equalled his best finish of the season in 8th place.

=== Post race ===
In the immediate aftermath of the race, Ricciardo insisted that his car was cursed and said that he "didn't see the point" in doing the final two races of the season.

=== Race classification ===
| Pos. | No. | Driver | Constructor | Laps | Time/Retired | Grid | Points |
|---|---|---|---|---|---|---|---|
| 1 | 33 | (Netherlands) Max Verstappen | Red Bull Racing-TAG Heuer | 71 | 1:38:28.851 | 2 | 25 |
| 2 | 5 | (Germany) Sebastian Vettel | Ferrari | 71 | +17.316 | 4 | 18 |
| 3 | 7 | (Finland) Kimi Räikkönen | Ferrari | 71 | +49.914 | 6 | 15 |
| 4 | 44 | (United Kingdom) Lewis Hamilton | Mercedes | 71 | +1:18.738 | 3 | 12 |
| 5 | 77 | (Finland) Valtteri Bottas | Mercedes | 70 | +1 lap | 5 | 10 |
| 6 | 27 | (Germany) Nico Hülkenberg | Renault | 69 | +2 laps | 7 | 8 |
| 7 | 16 | (Monaco) Charles Leclerc | Sauber-Ferrari | 69 | +2 laps | 9 | 6 |
| 8 | 2 | (Belgium) Stoffel Vandoorne | McLaren-Renault | 69 | +2 laps | 15 | 4 |
| 9 | 9 | (Sweden) Marcus Ericsson | Sauber-Ferrari | 69 | +2 laps | 10 | 2 |
| 10 | 10 | (France) Pierre Gasly | Scuderia Toro Rosso-Honda | 69 | +2 laps | 20 | 1 |
| 11 | 31 | (France) Esteban Ocon | Racing Point Force India-Mercedes | 69 | +2 laps | 11 | |
| 12 | 18 | (Canada) Lance Stroll | Williams-Mercedes | 69 | +2 laps | 17 | |
| 13 | 35 | (Russia) Sergey Sirotkin | Williams-Mercedes | 69 | +2 laps | 19 | |
| 14 | 28 | (New Zealand) Brendon Hartley | Scuderia Toro Rosso-Honda | 69 | +2 laps^{1} | 14 | |
| 15 | 20 | (Denmark) Kevin Magnussen | Haas-Ferrari | 69 | +2 laps | 16 | |
| 16 | 8 | (France) Romain Grosjean | Haas-Ferrari | 68 | +3 laps | 18 | |
| Ret | 3 | (Australia) Daniel Ricciardo | Red Bull Racing-TAG Heuer | 61 | Hydraulics | 1 | |
| Ret | 11 | (Mexico) Sergio Pérez | Racing Point Force India-Mercedes | 38 | Brakes | 13 | |
| Ret | 55 | (Spain) Carlos Sainz Jr. | Renault | 28 | Clutch | 8 | |
| Ret | 14 | (Spain) Fernando Alonso | McLaren-Renault | 3 | Water pressure | 12 | |

Notes

- ^1 – Brendon Hartley received a 5-second time penalty for causing a collision.

== Championship standings after the race ==
Drivers' Championship standings

| Pos. | Driver | Points |
|---|---|---|
| 1 | (United Kingdom) **Lewis Hamilton** | 358 |
| 2 | (Germany) Sebastian Vettel | 294 |
| 3 | (Finland) Kimi Räikkönen | 236 |
| 4 | (Finland) Valtteri Bottas | 227 |
| 5 | (Netherlands) Max Verstappen | 216 |

Constructors' Championship standings

| Pos. | Constructor | Points |
|---|---|---|
| 1 | (Germany) **Mercedes*** | 585 |
| 2 | (Italy) **Ferrari*** | 530 |
| 3 | (Austria) Red Bull Racing-TAG Heuer | 362 |
| 4 | (France) Renault | 114 |
| 5 | (United States) Haas-Ferrari | 84 |

- Note: Only the top five positions are included for both sets of standings.
- **Bold text** indicates the 2018 World Drivers' Champion.
- **Bold text** and an asterisk indicates competitors who still had a theoretical chance of becoming World Champion.

| Previous race: 2018 United States Grand Prix | FIA Formula One World Championship; 2018 season | Next race: 2018 Brazilian Grand Prix |
| Previous race: 2017 Mexican Grand Prix | Mexican Grand Prix | Next race: 2019 Mexican Grand Prix |
Awards
| Preceded by 2017 Mexican Grand Prix | Formula One Promotional Trophy for Race Promoter; 2018 | Succeeded by 2019 Mexican Grand Prix |
