= 2016 Hockenheimring GP2 Series round =

Motor race in Germany

(Germany) 2016 Hockenheimring GP2 round
Round details
- Round 7 of 11 rounds in the 2016 GP2 Series
- Layout of the Hockenheimring
- Location: Hockenheimring, Hockenheim, Germany
- Course: Permanent racing facility 4.574 km (2.842 mi)

GP2 Series

Feature race
- Date: 30 July 2016
- Laps: 38

Pole position
Driver	(Russia) Sergey Sirotkin	ART Grand Prix
- Time: 1:22.193

Podium
First	(Russia) Sergey Sirotkin	ART Grand Prix
Second	(Italy) Luca Ghiotto	Trident
Third	(Italy) Raffaele Marciello	Russian Time

Fastest lap
Driver	(Russia) Sergey Sirotkin	ART Grand Prix
- Time: 1:25.209 (on lap 31)

Sprint race
- Date: 31 July 2016
- Laps: 27

Podium
First	(United Kingdom) Alex Lynn	DAMS
Second	(Russia) Sergey Sirotkin	ART Grand Prix
Third	(France) Arthur Pic	Rapax

Fastest lap
Driver	(France) Pierre Gasly	Prema Racing
- Time: 1:26.081 (on lap 19)

The 2016 Hockenheimring GP2 Series round was a GP2 Series motor race held on 30 and 31 July 2016 at the Hockenheimring in Germany. It was the seventh round of the 2016 GP2 Series. The race weekend supported the 2016 German Grand Prix.

== Background ==
René Binder replaced Sergio Canamasas at Carlin GP2 team ahead of this round. This would be the second team Binder has driven for this year after having substituted for Nobuharu Matsushita in Austria for ART Grand Prix.

== Report ==
=== Qualifying ===
Sergey Sirotkin secured his third pole position of the year, marginally beating Pierre Gasly by sixteen-thousandths of a second, with Raffaele Marciello achieving third.

Pos.	No.	Driver	Team	Time	Gap	Grid
1	2	(Russia) Sergey Sirotkin	ART Grand Prix	1:22.193	–	1
2	21	(France) Pierre Gasly	Prema Racing	1:22.209	+0.016	2
3	9	(Italy) Raffaele Marciello	Russian Time	1:22.369	+0.176	3
4	20	(Italy) Antonio Giovinazzi	Prema Racing	1:22.384	+0.191	PL^{1}
5	22	(United Kingdom) Oliver Rowland	MP Motorsport	1:22.413	+0.220	4
6	5	(United Kingdom) Alex Lynn	DAMS	1:22.422	+0.229	5
7	3	(France) Norman Nato	Racing Engineering	1:22.489	+0.296	6
8	6	(Canada) Nicholas Latifi	DAMS	1:22.524	+0.331	7
9	4	(United Kingdom) Jordan King	Racing Engineering	1:22.548	+0.355	8
10	19	(Germany) Marvin Kirchhöfer	Carlin	1:22.796	+0.603	9
11	10	(Russia) Artem Markelov	Russian Time	1:22.805	+0.612	10
12	1	(Japan) Nobuharu Matsushita	ART Grand Prix	1:22.812	+0.619	11
13	11	(Sweden) Gustav Malja	Rapax	1:23.065	+0.872	12
14	15	(Italy) Luca Ghiotto	Trident	1:23.066	+0.873	13
15	7	(New Zealand) Mitch Evans	Campos Racing	1:23.398	+1.205	14
16	23	(Netherlands) Daniël de Jong	MP Motorsport	1:23.400	+1.207	15
17	18	(Austria) René Binder	Carlin	1:23.465	+1.272	16
18	12	(France) Arthur Pic	Rapax	1:23.469	+1.276	17
19	24	(Malaysia) Nabil Jeffri	Arden International	1:23.497	+1.304	18
20	25	(Sweden) Jimmy Eriksson	Arden International	1:23.535	+1.342	19
21	8	(Indonesia) Sean Gelael	Campos Racing	1:23.784	+1.591	20
22	14	(Indonesia) Philo Paz Armand	Trident	1:28.415	+2.206	21

^1 Antonio Giovinazzi was excluded from qualifying due to not complying with undertray requirements.

=== Feature Race ===
Sirotkin took his second victory in succession from Luca Ghiotto and Raffaele Marciello

Pos.	No.	Driver	Team	Laps	Time/Retired	Grid	Points
1	2	(Russia) Sergey Sirotkin	ART Grand Prix	38	1:00:28.437	1	25 (6)
2	15	(Italy) Luca Ghiotto	Trident	38	+13.146	13	18
3	9	(Italy) Raffaele Marciello	Russian Time	38	+17.783	3	15
4	12	(France) Arthur Pic	Rapax	38	+25.873	17	12
5	22	(United Kingdom) Oliver Rowland	MP Motorsport	38	+27.742	4	10
6	11	(Sweden) Gustav Malja	Rapax	38	+28.130	12	8
7	5	(United Kingdom) Alex Lynn	DAMS	38	+32.730	5	6
8	20	(Italy) Antonio Giovinazzi	Prema Racing	38	+36.051	PL	4
9	1	(Japan) Nobuharu Matsushita	ART Grand Prix	38	+38.838	11	2
10	19	(Germany) Marvin Kirchhöfer	Carlin	38	+43.798	9	1
11	24	(Malaysia) Nabil Jeffri	Arden International	38	+46.523	18	
12	25	(Sweden) Jimmy Eriksson	Arden International	38	+48.067	19	
13	18	(Austria) René Binder	Carlin	38	+50.706	16	
14	6	(Canada) Nicholas Latifi	DAMS	38	+52.389	7	
15	4	(United Kingdom) Jordan King	Racing Engineering	38	+53.034	8	
16	14	(Indonesia) Philo Paz Armand	Trident	38	+1:15.773	21	
Ret	3	(France) Norman Nato	Racing Engineering	28	Collision damage	6	
Ret	7	(New Zealand) Mitch Evans	Campos Racing	14	Brakes	14	
Ret	8	(Indonesia) Sean Gelael	Campos Racing	8	Collision	20	
Ret	23	(Netherlands) Daniël de Jong	MP Motorsport	8	Collision	15	
Ret	10	(Russia) Artem Markelov	Russian Time	6	Collision	10	
DSQ	21	(France) Pierre Gasly	Prema Racing	38	Disqualified	2	
Fastest lap: (Russia) Sergey Sirotkin (ART Grand Prix) – 1:31.703 (on lap 31)

=== Sprint Race ===
Alex Lynn took his first victory of the season after starting from the front row. It was also the first victory of the season for the DAMS outfit. Sirotkin finished second after a storming drive from eighth and Arthur Pic achieved third .

Pos.	No.	Driver	Team	Laps	Time/Retired	Grid	Points
1	5	(United Kingdom) Alex Lynn	DAMS	27	43:20.504	2	15
2	2	(Russia) Sergey Sirotkin	ART Grand Prix	27	+2.922	8	12
3	12	(France) Arthur Pic	Rapax	27	+4.688	5	10
4	15	(Italy) Luca Ghiotto	Trident	27	+6.206	7	8
5	22	(United Kingdom) Oliver Rowland	MP Motorsport	27	+8.187	4	6
6	21	(France) Pierre Gasly	Prema Racing	27	+8.486	17	4 (2)
7	9	(Italy) Raffaele Marciello	Russian Time	27	+9.259	2	2
8	11	(Sweden) Gustav Malja	Rapax	27	+10.292	3	1
9	10	(Russia) Artem Markelov	Russian Time	27	+14.404	PL	
10	7	(New Zealand) Mitch Evans	Campos Racing	27	+15.162	19	
11	4	(United Kingdom) Jordan King	Racing Engineering	27	+16.727	15	
12	1	(Japan) Nobuharu Matsushita	ART Grand Prix	27	+21.319	9	
13	25	(Sweden) Jimmy Eriksson	Arden International	27	+25.154	12	
14	19	(Germany) Marvin Kirchhöfer	Carlin	27	+25.292	10	
15	18	(Austria) René Binder	Carlin	27	+25.768	13	
16	23	(Netherlands) Daniël de Jong	MP Motorsport	27	+34.778	21	
17	6	(Canada) Nicholas Latifi	DAMS	27	+41.617	14	
18	3	(France) Norman Nato	Racing Engineering	26	+1 Lap	18	
19	8	(Indonesia) Sean Gelael	Campos Racing	24	+3 Laps	20	
Ret	14	(Indonesia) Philo Paz Armand	Trident	22	Handling	16	
Ret	20	(Italy) Antonio Giovinazzi	Prema Racing	13	Collision	1	
Ret	24	(Malaysia) Nabil Jeffri	Arden International	6	Collision damage	11	
Fastest lap: (France) Pierre Gasly (Prema Racing) – 1:26.081 (on lap 19)

== Standings after the round ==
Drivers' Championship standings

	Pos	Driver	Points
7	1	(Russia) Sergey Sirotkin	113
1	2	(France) Pierre Gasly	113
	3	(Italy) Raffaele Marciello	102
2	4	(Italy) Antonio Giovinazzi	100
1	5	(United Kingdom) Oliver Rowland	99

Teams' Championship standings

	Pos	Team	Points
	1	(Italy) Prema Racing	213
2	2	(France) ART Grand Prix	171
	3	(Russia) Russian Time	167
2	4	(Spain) Racing Engineering	161
1	5	(Netherlands) MP Motorsport	105

- Note: Only the top five positions are included for both sets of standings.

== See also ==
- 2016 German Grand Prix
- 2016 Hockenheimring GP3 Series round

Previous round: 2016 Hungaroring GP2 Series round	GP2 Series; 2016 season	Next round: 2016 Spa-Francorchamps GP2 Series round
Previous round: 2014 Hockenheimring GP2 Series round	Hockenheimring GP2 round	Next round: None
