= Sergey Sirotkin =

Russian racing driver (born 1995)

- Серге́й Сиро́ткин
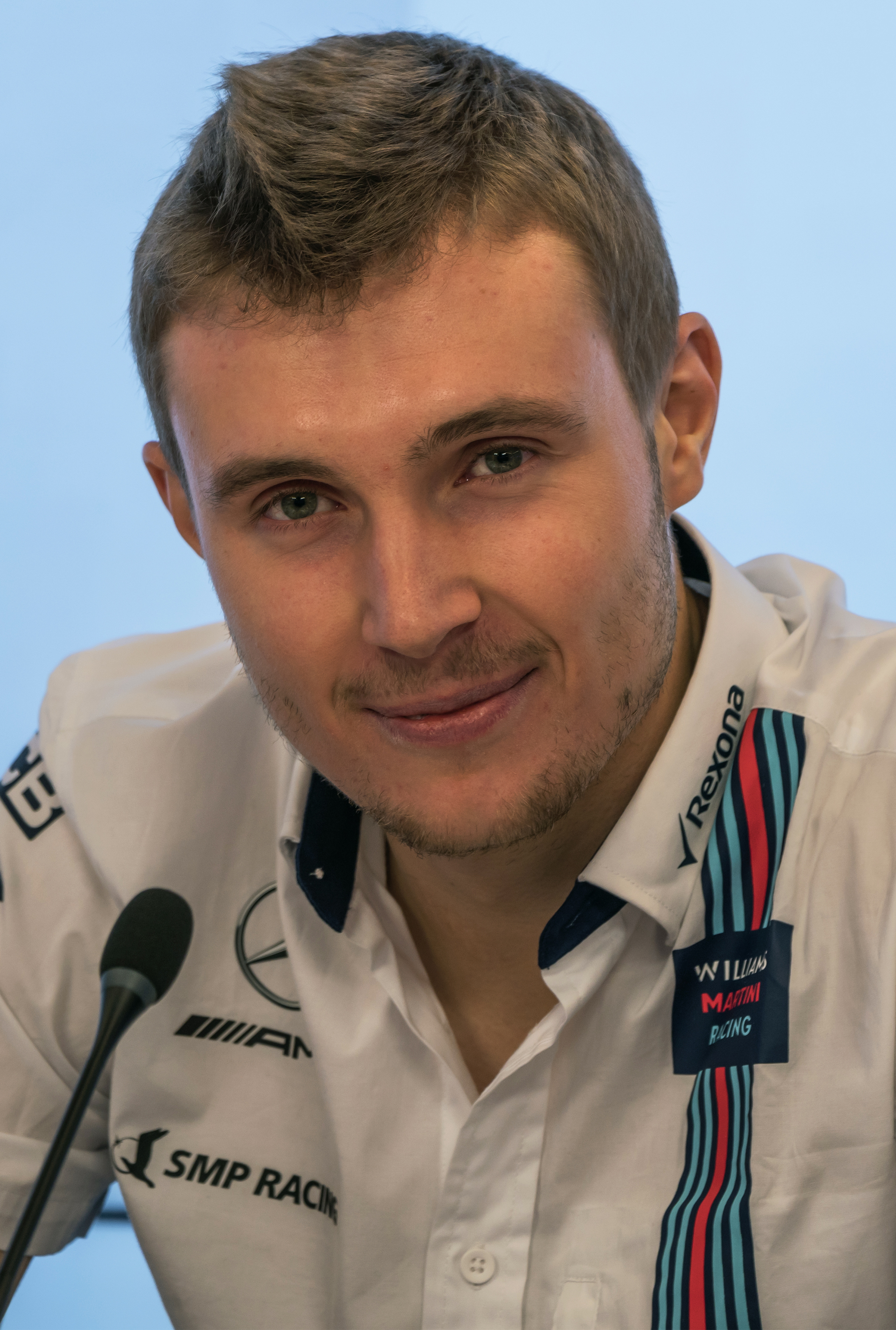
- Sirotkin in 2018
- Born: Sergey Olegovich Sirotkin; 27 August 1995 (age 31); Moscow, Russia

Middle East Trophy career
- Debut season: 2023–24
- Current team: SMP
- Categorisation: FIA Platinum
- Car number: 7
- Starts: 3
- Wins: 0
- Poles: 0
- Fastest laps: 0
- Best finish: 5th in 2025

Formula One World Championship career
- Nationality: (Russia) Russian
- Active years: 2018
- Team: Williams
- Car number: 35
- Entries: 21 (21 starts)
- Championships: 0
- Wins: 0
- Podiums: 0
- Career points: 1
- Pole positions: 0
- Fastest laps: 0
- First entry: 2018 Australian Grand Prix
- Last entry: 2018 Abu Dhabi Grand Prix

Previous series
- 2017 2015–16 2012–14 2012 2012 2010–11: FIA Formula 2 Championship; GP2 Series; Formula Renault 3.5 Series; Auto GP World Series; Italian Formula Three; Formula Abarth

Championship titles
- 2011: Formula Abarth European Series
- Website: Official website

Sergey Olegovich Sirotkin (Russian: Серге́й Оле́гович Сиро́ткин, IPA: [sʲɪrˈɡʲej ɐˈlʲeɡəvʲɪtɕ sʲɪˈrotkʲɪn]; born 27 August 1995) is a Russian racing driver, who most recently competed in the 2025 Middle East Trophy for SMP Racing. Sirotkin competed in Formula One in 2018.

Born and raised in Moscow, Sirotkin is the son of Oleg Sirotkin, former head of the NIAT in Russia. He began karting aged 12 before graduating to Formula Abarth in 2010, winning the European Championship and finishing runner-up in the Italian Championship the following season. After competing in Italian Formula 3 and Formula Renault 3.5, Sirotkin progressed to the GP2 Series with Rapax in 2015. Sirotkin twice finished third in the GP2 standings with Rapax and ART, taking several wins across his two full seasons in the series. Following this—having already served as a test driver for Sauber—Sirotkin was promoted to reserve driver at Renault in 2017. After impressing at the Yas Marina post-season test, Sirotkin signed for Williams in 2018, replacing Felipe Massa to partner Lance Stroll and making his Formula One debut at the Australian Grand Prix. He scored his maiden points finish in Italy, but was dropped by Williams at the end of the season after SMP withdrew his sponsorship due to performance concerns with the FW41. Sirotkin returned as a reserve driver for Renault and McLaren in 2019, remaining at the former for 2020 before his departure.

Since leaving Formula One, Sirotkin has moved into sportscar racing, competing in the FIA World Endurance Championship, GT World Challenge Europe, Intercontinental GT Challenge and the Middle East Trophy for SMP.

== Early and personal life ==
Sergey Olegovich Sirotkin was born on 27 August 1995 in Moscow, Russia. His father, Oleg Sirotkin, was head of the National Institute of Aviation Technologies, Russia. He graduated from Moscow Automobile and Road Construction University in 2017 with a degree in race car engineering.

== Junior racing career ==
=== Karting ===
Sirotkin began karting in 2008 and raced in various international series, working his way up from the junior ranks to progress through to the KF3 and KF2 category by 2010.

=== Formula Abarth ===
Having turned 15 years old, Sirotkin graduated to single-seaters, racing in the newly launched Formula Abarth series in Italy for Jenzer Motorsport. He made his début at Vallelunga, finishing the first race in the points and later added four more point-scoring finishes to finish 18th in the championship. Sirotkin remained in Formula Abarth, and with Jenzer, for a second season in 2011; the series splitting into two separate classifications for European and Italian championship races. But prior to the round at Spa, Sirotkin switched to the Euronova Racing by Fortec team. He won the European Series title with a race to spare, taking five wins in fourteen races. In the Italian Series, Sirotkin finished as runner-up with two race victories, losing out to former teammate Patric Niederhauser after an error in the final race at Autodromo Nazionale Monza.

=== Auto GP World Series ===
In 2012, Sirotkin continued his collaboration with Euronova Racing into the Auto GP World Series. His first round at Monza saw him qualify on the front row, losing pole position to Adrian Quaife-Hobbs by just 0.04 seconds. He stalled at the start of the first race, but recorded a finish of fourth place in the second race; he also set the fastest lap in both races. At Valencia, he again started behind points leader Quaife-Hobbs, but this time Sirotkin passed him before the first turn, and eventually scored his first win—again setting fastest lap—becoming the youngest Auto GP winner in the process. After another fastest lap in the second race, Sirotkin established a record of four consecutive fastest laps; breaking a record previously held by Romain Grosjean. Sirotkin went on to finish the season in third place overall, behind Quaife-Hobbs and Pål Varhaug. He finished the season with two race wins in Valencia and Sonoma, and seven podium finishes. He also recorded his first pole position at the Marrakech Street Circuit.

=== Formula Three ===
Sirotkin also participated in the Italian Formula Three Championship in 2012, driving for Euronova. He recorded two wins at the Hungaroring and Monza, and a further four podium finishes over the course of the season. He also scored points in twenty-two of the twenty-four races—after retiring from the second race at Vallelunga and being disqualified from the third race at Monza—and finished the season fifth overall in both the European and Italian Series championships.

=== Formula Renault 3.5 Series ===
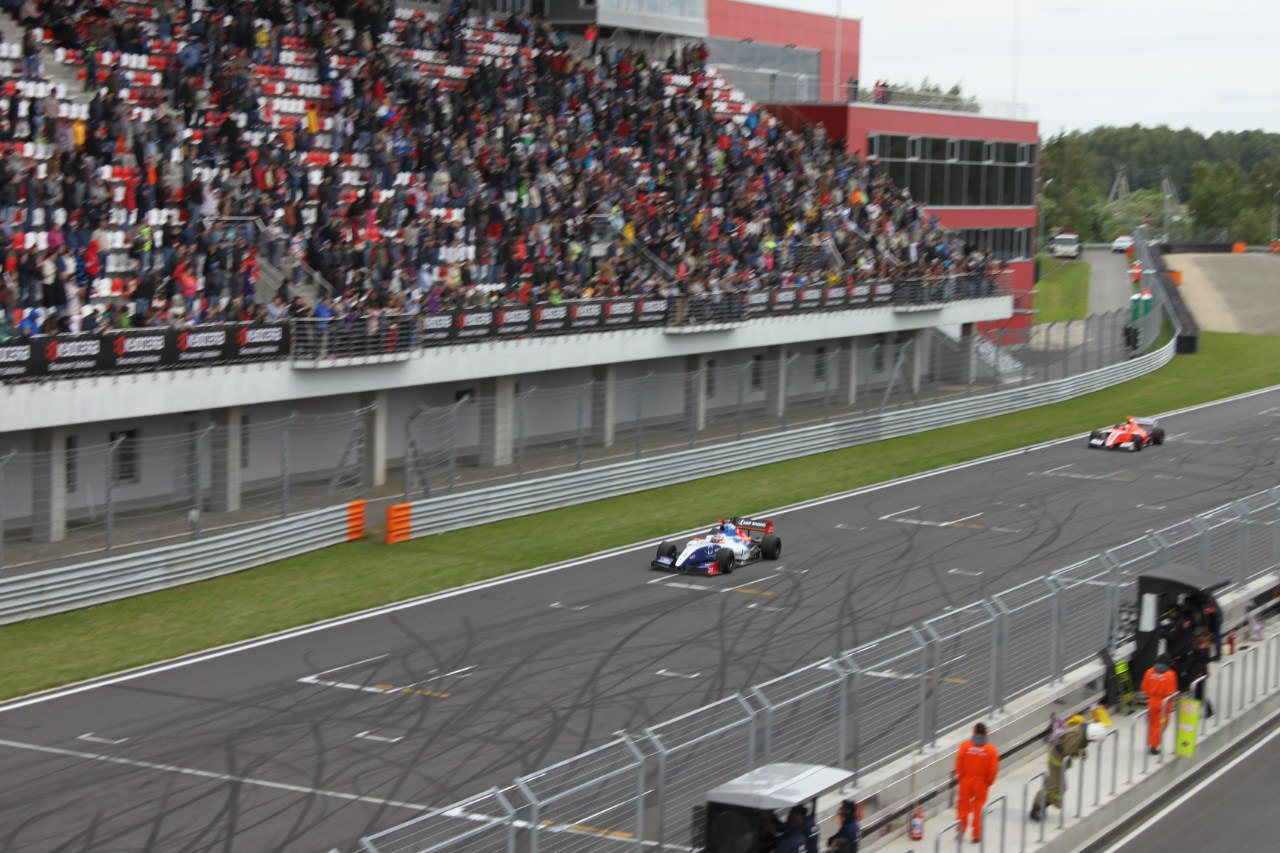
Sirotkin leads Zoël Amberg during Race 1 of the 2014 Formula Renault 3.5 Series at Moscow Raceway

Sirotkin made his Formula Renault 3.5 debut in his home event at the Moscow Raceway, partnering fellow Russian driver Nikolay Martsenko at BVM Target. He finished the first race of the meeting in twentieth place, before retiring from the second race.

Sirotkin expanded his Formula Renault 3.5 campaign to contest a full season in 2013, competing with ISR Racing. He had podiums at Alcañiz and Hungaroring with another three-point-scoring finishes to achieve the ninth place in the championship standings.

For 2014, Sirotkin switched to the Fortec Motorsport team and partnered there with Oliver Rowland. He scored his first pole position and won his first Formula Renault 3.5 Series race on his home soil at Moscow Raceway. Despite this, the second Forteс car often broke and he did not finish in five races. But whenever he finished a race, he usually did this in points, missing a points finish only once. Overall, he finished fifth in the championship, with 132 points.

=== GP2 Series ===
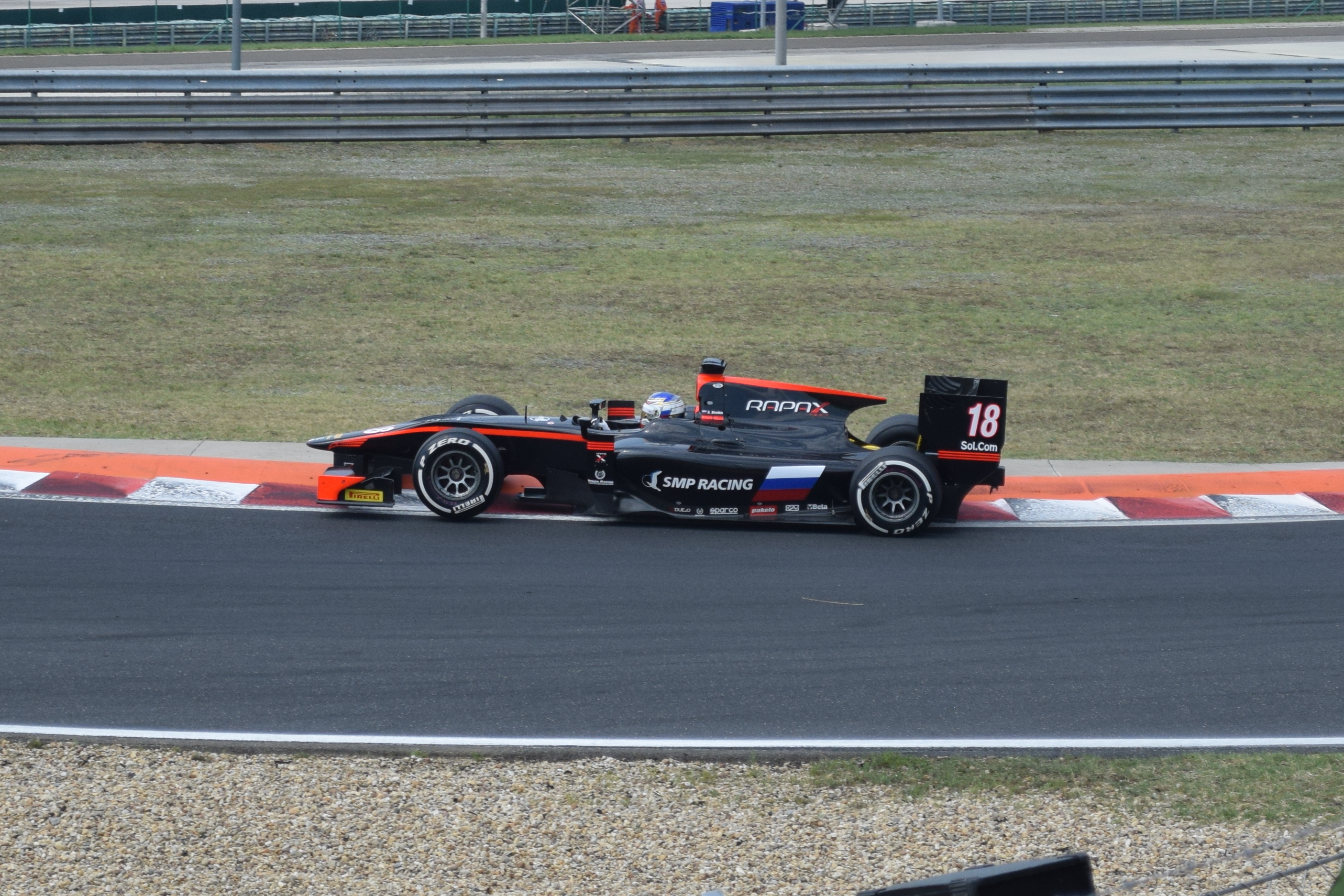
Sirotkin during the 2015 Hungaroring GP2 Series round

In February 2015, it was announced that Sirotkin would debut in the series with Rapax. He achieved his first victory at Silverstone on which he had no previous racing experience—when he won the feature race. During the season he had another four podium finishes. Though a GP2 rookie, Sirotkin finished third in the overall standings.

For the 2016 season, Sirotkin switched to defending champions ART Grand Prix. He had a tough start of the season, as he spun and stalled in the season opener at Barcelona. His problems continued in the Feature race in Monaco, where he had started from pole position but crashed into the wall. Sirotkin converted his pace to race results in Baku with double podium finish in both Feature and Sprint races. At Spielberg he took a pole position but had a poor start and was given a ten-second time penalty for failing to re-establish his original starting position before the safety car line and of failing to re-enter the pitlane. Sirotkin had another double podium finish in the Hungaroring round. He continued to win, repeating success in the feature Hockenheim race. He had technical issues with a car at Monza and Spa-Francorchamps before finishing second in Sepang. He finished third in the final race of the season at Abu Dhabi, tying with Raffaele Marciello in the drivers' standings. Sirotkin was classified third in the standings as he had achieved more wins than Marciello.

=== FIA Formula 2 Championship ===
Sirotkin had a one-round return to the wheel of the Dallara GP2/11 car in the 2017 FIA Formula 2 Championship at Baku. He replaced injured Alexander Albon in ART Grand Prix. He finished both races of the round in points.

In 2020, Sirotkin returned to Formula 2 with ART Grand Prix for pre-season testing as a replacement for the quarantined Christian Lundgaard.

== Formula One career ==
In July 2013, Sirotkin joined the Sauber Formula One team, with the aim of participating in Friday sessions in 2013 with a view to making his race début, and a full race seat for the 2014 season. He stayed in his role as test driver in 2014. Sirotkin participated in tests that took place in Bahrain on 8 April, where he completed 75 laps and covered a distance of over 300 kilometres, recording the 8th fastest time. This result allowed Sirotkin to get a Superlicence. Sirotkin made his race weekend debut in free practice at the 2014 Russian Grand Prix, where he recorded the 17th fastest time, some four-tenths of a second slower than his more experienced teammate Adrian Sutil. Sirotkin was unable to secure a contract with Sauber for 2015 because the team completely changed its structure and selected drivers with good financing.

In April 2016, Sirotkin's Formula One chances were revived when it was announced that he would act as a development driver for the Renault Sport F1 Team and would take part in the first free practice session of the Russian Grand Prix.

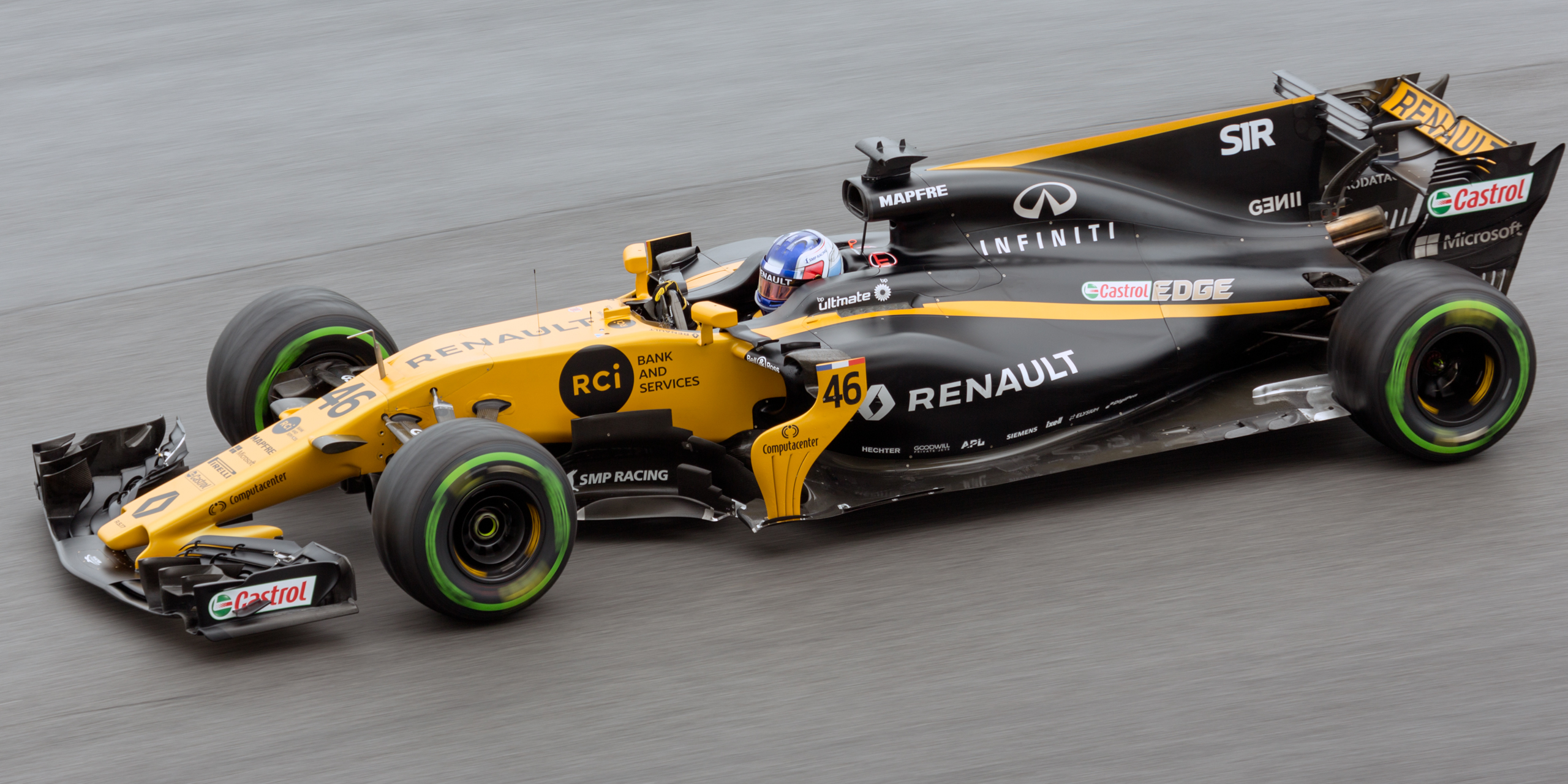
Sirotkin during the first free practice session of the 2017 Malaysian Grand Prix at Sepang.

He became a reserve driver for 2017, remaining with Renault. He took part in the first free practice sessions during the Russian, Spanish, Austrian and Malaysian Grands Prix and received positive feedback from Renault head Cyril Abiteboul.

=== Williams (2018) ===
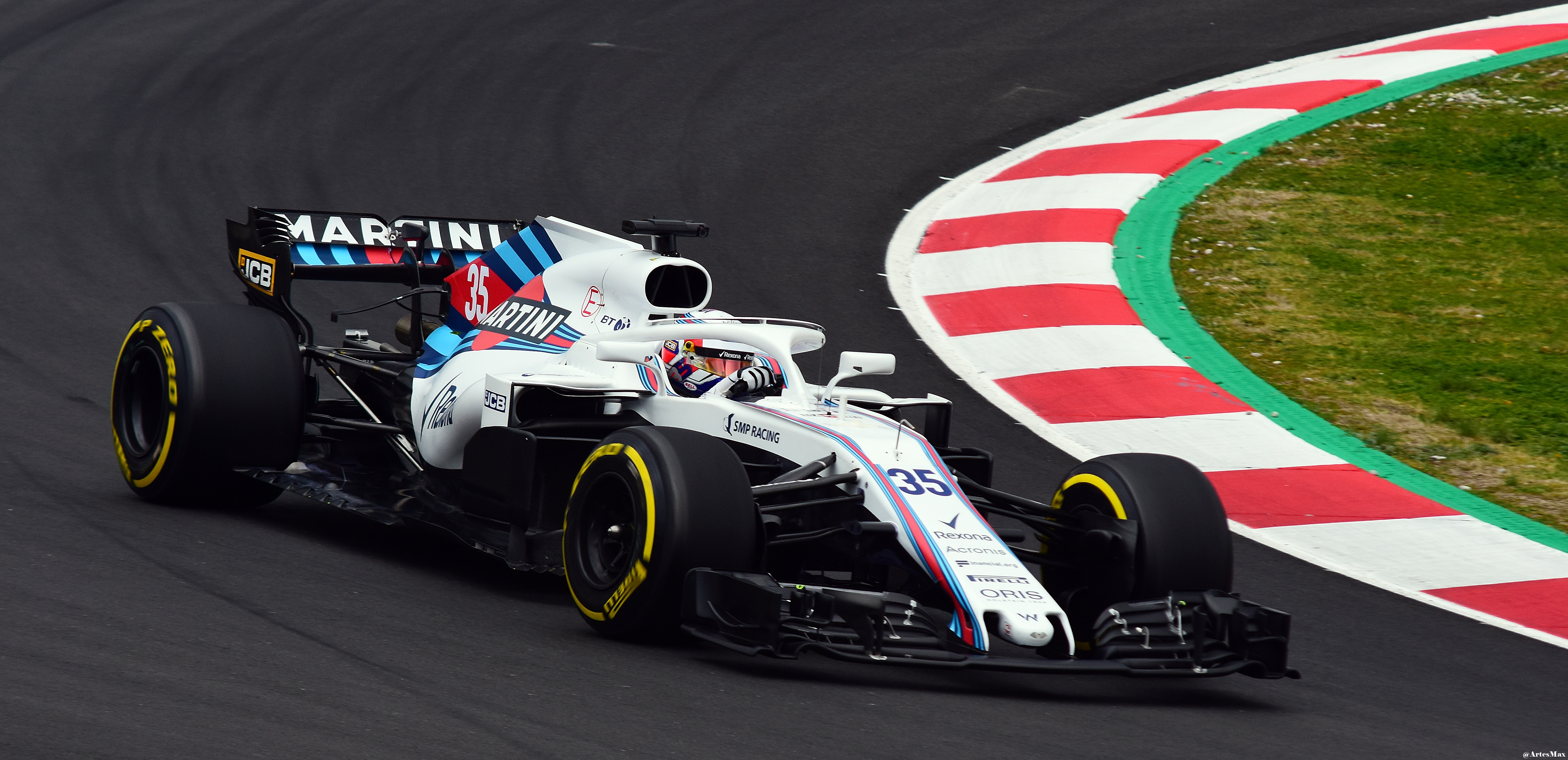
Sirotkin testing for Williams in 2018 at the Circuit de Barcelona-Catalunya

After the 2017 Abu Dhabi Grand Prix Sirotkin had a half-day test with Williams at the Yas Marina Circuit as the team evaluated potential drivers for the 2018 championship. Sirotkin impressed the team with his driving pace and talent, technical feedback and work ethic. In January 2018, he was announced by Williams as their new driver for the 2018 season as the teammate of Lance Stroll, replacing Felipe Massa, who retired from the sport.

Sirotkin qualified 19th for his first Grand Prix in Australia, but his first F1 race was ended shortly after a sandwich bag got into his Williams car brake system. For the next two races (Bahrain and China) he out-qualified Stroll, but finished just behind him in fifteenth place. He made it into the second qualifying segment for the first time at Baku, qualifying 12th, but his race was ended on the first lap after he was squeezed between Nico Hülkenberg and Fernando Alonso's cars and his car suffered front-left suspension damage. Prior to the accident he also collided with Sergio Pérez which led to the three-place grid penalty on the start of the Spanish Grand Prix. In Spain Sirotkin qualified ahead of Stroll, but lost his place on the grid to him after the penalty was applied. He had a seat problem during the race and was the last driver to cross the finish line. He again out-qualified Stroll at Monaco. Sirotkin passed Stoffel Vandoorne on the first lap but his race was ruined after the mechanics were not able to fit the tyres in time for the three-minute signal prior start of the race. He received a ten-second stop-and-go penalty for this, finishing the race second last, ahead of Stroll.

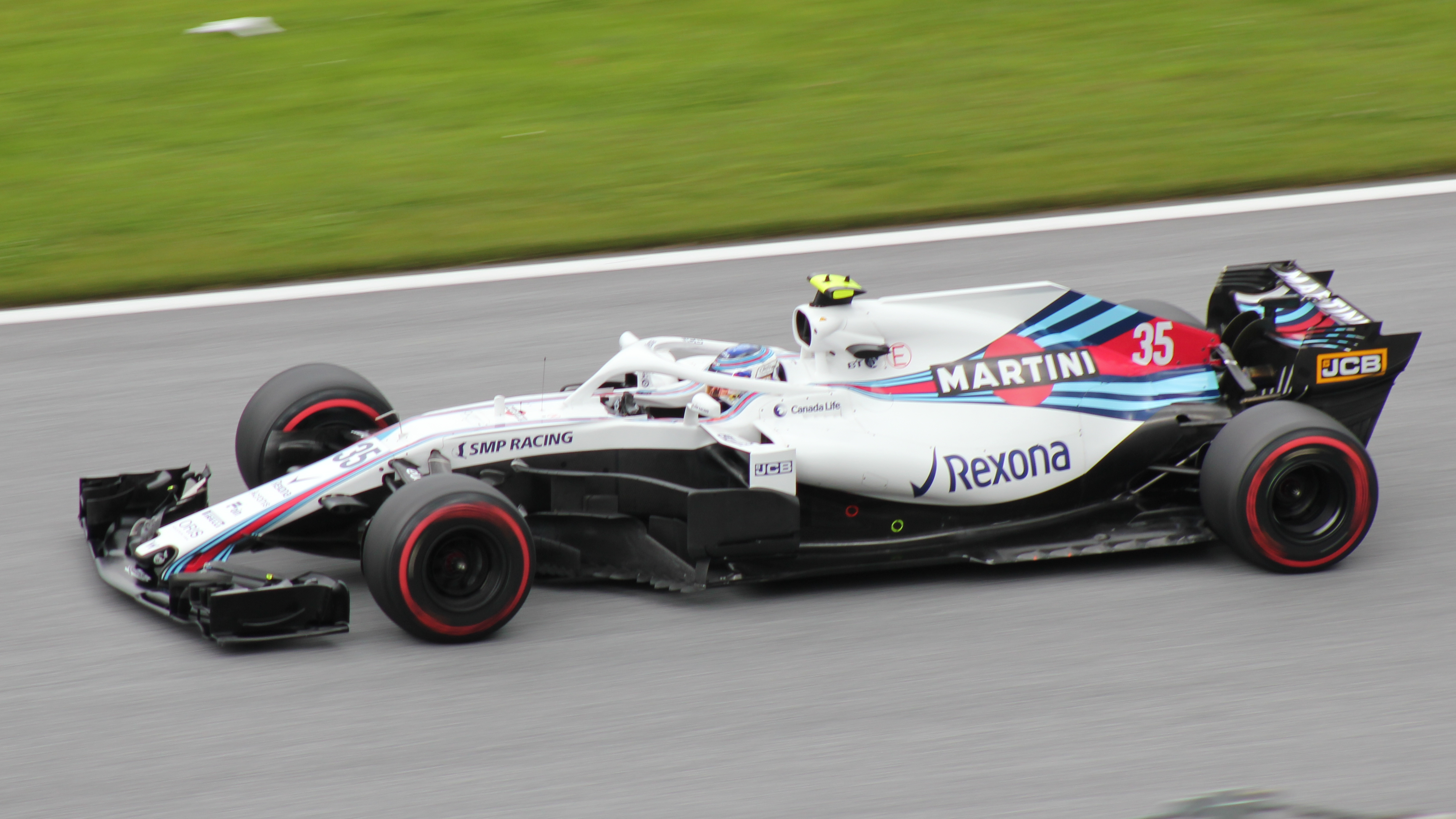
Sirotkin at the 2018 Austrian Grand Prix

Williams had the slowest car in the Canadian Grand Prix, Sirotkin finished 17th, at the back of the field. The situation with the car remained the same for the triple header (French, Austrian and British Grand Prix), where he was the last man to cross the finish line. The car was slightly improved for the German Grand Prix, allowing him to repeat the Baku grid position, but in the race he was forced to retire due to an engine oil leak. Sirotkin did not gain from the rain-affected qualifying of the Hungarian Grand Prix, finishing second last, just ahead of Stroll.

After the summer break, Sirotkin improved his finishing position for two races in a row. At Spa, he finished 12th ahead of Stroll, despite a collision at the start with Valtteri Bottas. While in the Italian Grand Prix, he finished eleventh but was promoted to tenth, scoring his first ever World Championship point after Romain Grosjean was disqualified for technical infringements.

Sirotkin out-qualified Stroll once again at the Singapore Grand Prix, but his race became complicated after the front wing of his car collected the wheel rim from Esteban Ocon's car. He was forced to make an early pit-stop, and had a long battle with Sergio Pérez, who turned into the Russian driver's car. Due to the damage, his car had problems during braking which led to him blocking Brendon Hartley's car. Sirotkin got a five second time penalty for the blocking and finished last. His home race, the Russian Grand Prix, where he started 13th ahead of Stroll, was ruined after his car was sandwiched between the cars of Carlos Sainz Jr. and Marcus Ericsson, and he finished last again. Sirotkin lost out to Stroll in qualifying for the Japanese Grand Prix but finished one place ahead of him in the race.

In the United States Grand Prix the qualifying and race battles with Stroll were won by Sirotkin. While in the Mexican Grand Prix the situation was opposite, with Sirotkin outpaced by Stroll in both qualifying and race. In the Brazilian Grand Prix Sirotkin surpassed Stroll again in qualifying and race.

Prior to the Abu Dhabi Grand Prix, it was announced that Sirotkin would not continue to race with Williams in 2019. His backer SMP Racing decided to stop their partnership with Williams due to lack of performance and development of the car. In qualifying, he was penultimate, ahead of Stroll. But at the start he lost a position and then had overheating problems, finishing last in the race and in the drivers' championship overall with the only point scored at Monza.

=== Reserve driver roles (2019–2020) ===
In 2019, Sirotkin served as reserve driver for the Formula One teams of both McLaren and Renault. He continued as reserve driver for Renault in 2020.

== Sportscar racing career ==
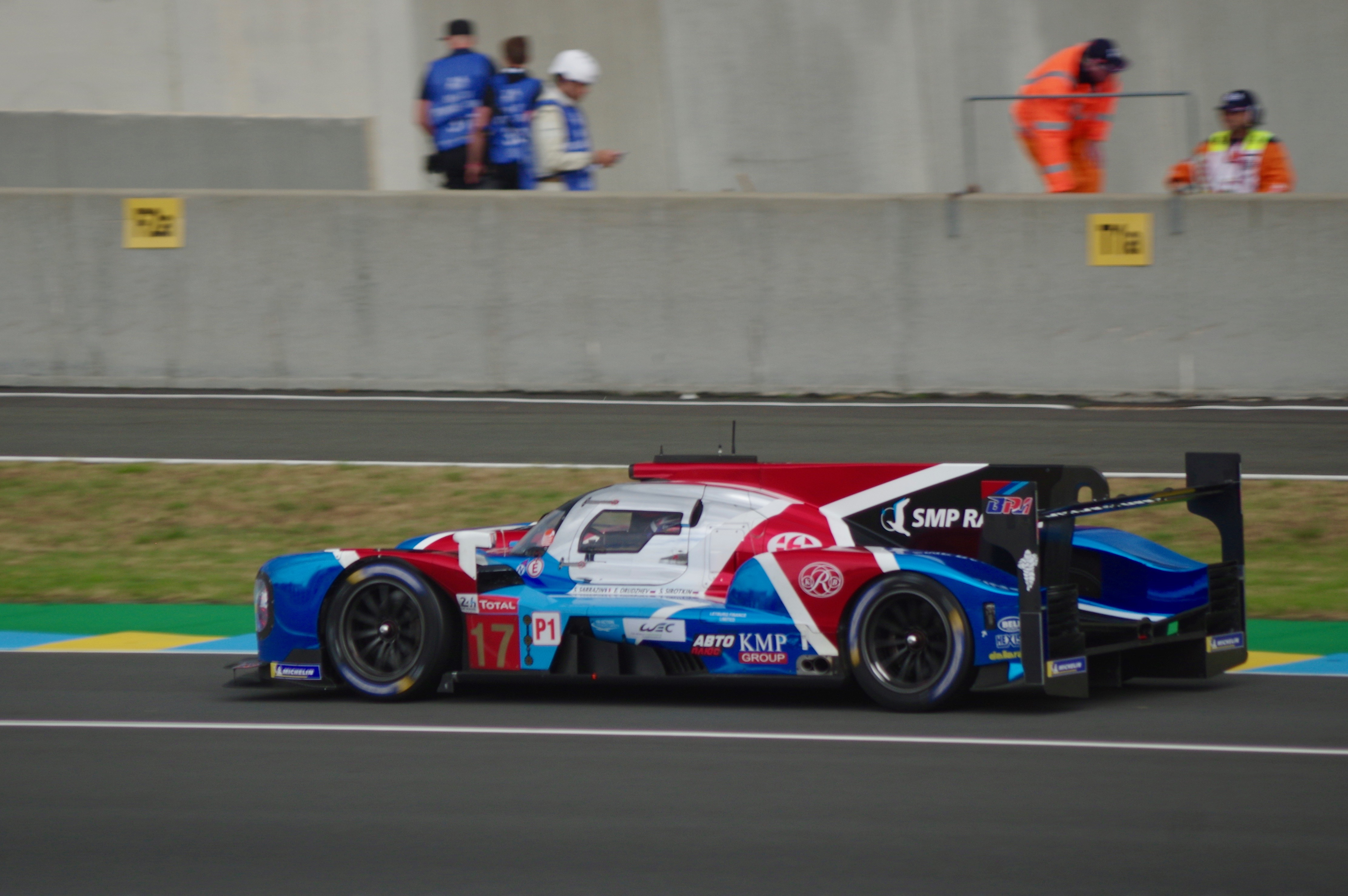
The BR Engineering BR1 driven by Sarrazin, and Orudzhev at the 2019 24 Hours of Le Mans

Sirotkin raced at the 2017 24 Hours of Le Mans for SMP Racing with Mikhail Aleshin and Viktor Shaytar, finishing 36 laps behind the LMP2 class winner. In 2019, he drove a LMP1-class BR1 together with Stéphane Sarrazin and Egor Orudzhev, the latter crashing mid-race.

In 2020, Sirotkin signed with AF Corse to drive a factory-supported Ferrari 488 GT3 at the GT World Challenge Europe Endurance Cup.

== Karting record ==
=== Karting career summary ===
Season	Series	Team	Position
2008	Silver Cup — KF3		11th
2008	Göteborgs Stora Pris — KF3	Ward Racing	1st
2008	CIK-FIA Viking Trophy — KF3	Ward Racing	27th
2008	CIK-FIA Monaco Kart Cup — KF3	Ward Racing	19th
2008	WSK International Series — KF3	Ward Racing	12th
2008	CIK-FIA Asia-Pacific Championship — KF3	Tony Kart Junior Racing Team	11th
2009	South Garda Winter Cup — KF3	Tony Kart Junior Racing Team	16th
2009	Andrea Margutti Trophy — KF3	Tony Kart Junior Racing Team	32nd
2009	WSK International Series — KF3	Tony Kart Junior Racing Team	22nd
2009	German Karting Championship — Junior	Ward Racing	20th
2009	CIK-FIA Viking Trophy — KF3	Ward Racing	3rd
2009	CIK-FIA World Cup — KF3	Ward Racing	26th
2010	South Garda Winter Cup — KF2	Energy Corse	16th
2010	CIK-FIA Viking Trophy — KF2	Ward Racing	4th
2010	CIK-FIA European Championship — KF2	Ward Racing	54th

== Racing record ==
=== Racing career summary ===
Season	Series	Team	Races	Wins	Poles	F/Laps	Podiums	Points	Position
2010	Formula Abarth	Jenzer Motorsport	6	0	0	0	0	12	18th
2011	Formula Abarth European Series	Jenzer Motorsport	14	5	1	3	10	175	**1st**
2011	Formula Abarth European Series	Euronova Racing by Fortec	14	5	1	3	10	175	**1st**
2011	Formula Abarth Italian Series	Jenzer Motorsport	14	2	1	1	9	136	**2nd**
2011	Formula Abarth Italian Series	Euronova Racing by Fortec	14	2	1	1	9	136	**2nd**
2012	Auto GP World Series	Euronova Racing	14	2	1	5	9	175	**3rd**
2012	Italian Formula 3 European Series	Euronova Racing by Fortec	24	2	0	1	6	166	5th
2012	Italian Formula 3 Italian Series	Euronova Racing by Fortec	18	0	0	0	5	116	6th
2012	Formula Renault 3.5 Series	BVM Target	2	0	0	0	0	0	35th
2013	Formula Renault 3.5 Series	ISR	15	0	0	0	2	61	9th
2013	Formula One	Sauber F1 Team	Test driver						
2014	Formula Renault 3.5 Series	Fortec Motorsports	17	1	1	0	4	132	5th
2014	Formula One	Sauber F1 Team	Test driver						
2015	GP2 Series	Rapax	22	1	1	1	5	139	**3rd**
2016	GP2 Series	ART Grand Prix	22	2	3	3	8	159	**3rd**
2016	Formula One	Renault Sport F1 Team	Development driver						
2017	FIA Formula 2 Championship	ART Grand Prix	2	0	0	0	0	9	20th
2017	24 Hours of Le Mans – LMP2	SMP Racing	1	0	0	0	0	—N/a	16th
2017	Formula One	Renault Sport F1 Team	Reserve driver						
2018	Formula One	Williams Martini Racing	21	0	0	0	0	1	20th
2018–19	FIA World Endurance Championship	SMP Racing	3	0	0	0	0	12	23rd
2019	24 Hours of Le Mans	SMP Racing	1	0	0	0	0	—N/a	NC
2019	Formula One	Renault F1 Team	Reserve driver						
2019	Formula One	McLaren F1 Team	Reserve driver						
2020	GT World Challenge Europe Endurance Cup	SMP Racing	4	0	1	0	0	7	20th
2020	Intercontinental GT Challenge	SMP Racing	1	0	0	0	0	0	NC
2020	Formula One	Renault DP World F1 Team	Reserve driver						
2023	SMP RSKG Endurance – Group F	SMP Racing	4	3	1	0	3	1098	**1st**
2023–24	Middle East Trophy – 992	SMP Racing	1	0	1	0	0	—N/a	NC†
2025	Middle East Trophy – GT3	SMP Racing	2	0	0	0	0	25	5th
2025–26	SMP F4 Winter Series	TEAMGARIS	1	0	0	0	0	0	NC†

=== Complete Formula Abarth results ===
(key) (Races in bold indicate pole position) (Races in italics indicate fastest lap)

Year	Entrant	1	2	3	4	5	6	7	8	9	10	11	12	13	14	Pos	Points
2010	Jenzer Motorsport	MIS; 1	MIS; 2	MGI; 1	MGI; 2	IMO; 1	IMO; 2	VAR; 1	VAR; 2	VLL; 1; 9	VLL; 2; 10	MUG; 1; 11	MUG; 2; 8	MNZ; 1; 13	MNZ; 2; 11	18th	12
2011	Jenzer Motorsport	VLL; 1; 14	VLL; 2; 3	VAR; 1; 3	VAR; 2; 3	MIS; 1; 2	MIS; 2; 5	IMO; 1; 3	IMO; 2 Ret							2nd	136
2011	Euronova Racing by Fortec									SPA; 1; 1	SPA; 2; 8	**MUG**; **1**; 3	MUG; 2; 3	MNZ; 1; 1	MNZ; 2 Ret	2nd	136

=== Complete Italian Formula Three Championship results ===
(key) (Races in bold indicate pole position) (Races in italics indicate fastest lap)

Year	Entrant	Chassis	1	2	3	4	5	6	7	8	9	10	11	12	13	14	15	16	17	18	19	20	21	22	23	24	Pos	Points
2012	Euronova Racing by Fortec	Dallara F308	VAL; 1; 4	VAL; 2; 6	VAL; 3; 2	HUN; 1; 6	HUN; 2; 6	HUN; 3; 1	MUG; 1; 4	MUG; 2; 8	MUG; 3; 2	MIS; 1; 4	MIS; 2; 5	MIS; 3; 10	RBR; 1; 8	RBR; 2; 5	RBR; 3; 6	IMO; 1; 3	IMO; 2; 7	IMO; 3; 3	VLL; 1 Ret	VLL; 2; 7	VLL; 3; 8	MNZ; 1; 5	MNZ; 2; 1	MNZ; 3 DSQ	5th	166

=== Complete Auto GP World Series results ===
(key) (Races in bold indicate pole position) (Races in italics indicate fastest lap)

Year	Entrant	1	2	3	4	5	6	7	8	9	10	11	12	13	14	Pos	Points
2012	Euronova Racing	MNZ; 1; 14	MNZ; 2; 4	VAL; 1; 1	VAL; 2; 3	**MAR**; **1**; 6	MAR; 2; 2	HUN; 1; 13	HUN; 2; 3	ALG; 1; 3	ALG; 2; 3	CUR; 1; 3	CUR; 2; 4	SON; 1; 3	SON; 2; 1	3rd	175

=== Complete Formula Renault 3.5 Series results ===
(key) (Races in bold indicate pole position) (Races in italics indicate fastest lap)

Year	Team	1	2	3	4	5	6	7	8	9	10	11	12	13	14	15	16	17	Pos	Points
2012	BVM Target	ARA; 1	ARA; 2	MON; 1	SPA; 1	SPA; 2	NÜR; 1	NÜR; 2	MSC; 1; 20	MSC; 2 Ret	SIL; 1	SIL; 2	HUN; 1	HUN; 2	LEC; 1	LEC; 2	CAT; 1	CAT; 2	35th	0
2013	ISR	MNZ; 1 Ret	MNZ; 2; 19†	ARA; 1; 4	ARA; 2; 2	MON; 1; 22	SPA; 1; 18	SPA; 2; 8	MSC; 1 DNS	MSC; 2; 11	RBR; 1 Ret	RBR; 2; 4	HUN; 1; 3	HUN; 2; 12	LEC; 1 WD	LEC; 2 Ret	CAT; 1 Ret	CAT; 2 Ret	9th	61
2014	Fortec Motorsports	MNZ; 1; 7	MNZ; 2; 3	ARA; 1; 8	ARA; 2 Ret	MON; 1 Ret	SPA; 1 Ret	SPA; 2 Ret	**MSC**; **1**; 1	MSC; 2; 4	NÜR; 1; 3	NÜR; 2; 4	HUN; 1; 14	HUN; 2 Ret	LEC; 1; 4	LEC; 2; 7	JER; 1; 3	JER; 2; 5	5th	132

^{†} Did not finish, but was classified as he had completed more than 90% of the race distance.

=== Complete GP2 Series/FIA Formula 2 Championship results ===
(key) (Races in bold indicate pole position) (Races in italics indicate fastest lap)

Year	Entrant	1	2	3	4	5	6	7	8	9	10	11	12	13	14	15	16	17	18	19	20	21	22	DC	Points
2015	Rapax	BHR; FEA; 12	BHR; SPR; 14	CAT; FEA; 16	CAT; SPR; 10	MON; FEA; 5	MON; SPR; 3	RBR; FEA; 2	RBR; SPR; 4	**SIL**; **FEA**; 1	SIL; SPR; 8	HUN; FEA; 3	HUN; SPR; 3	SPA; FEA; 9	SPA; SPR; 6	MNZ; FEA; Ret	MNZ; SPR; 5	SOC; FEA; 4	SOC; SPR; 21	BHR; FEA; 5	BHR; SPR; 4	YMC; FEA; 13	YMC; SPR; C	3rd	139
2016	ART Grand Prix	CAT; FEA; Ret	CAT; SPR; 11	**MON**; **FEA**; Ret	MON; SPR; Ret	BAK; FEA; 2	BAK; SPR; 3	**RBR**; **FEA**; 12	RBR; SPR; 6	SIL; FEA; 18	SIL; SPR; 21	HUN; FEA; 3	HUN; SPR; 1	**HOC**; **FEA**; 1	HOC; SPR; 2	SPA; FEA; 9	SPA; SPR; 16	MNZ; FEA; 14	MNZ; SPR; Ret	SEP; FEA; 2	SEP; SPR; Ret	YMC; FEA; 4	YMC; SPR; 3	3rd	159
2017	ART Grand Prix	BHR; FEA	BHR; SPR	CAT; FEA	CAT; SPR	MON; FEA	MON; SPR	BAK; FEA; 10	BAK; SPR; 4	RBR; FEA	RBR; SPR	SIL; FEA	SIL; SPR	HUN; FEA	HUN; SPR	SPA; FEA	SPA; SPR	MNZ; FEA	MNZ; SPR	JER; FEA	JER; SPR	YMC; FEA	YMC; SPR	20th	9

=== Complete Formula One results ===
(key) (Races in bold indicate pole position) (Races in italics indicates fastest lap)

Year	Entrant	Chassis	Engine	1	2	3	4	5	6	7	8	9	10	11	12	13	14	15	16	17	18	19	20	21	WDC	Points
2014	Sauber F1 Team	Sauber C33	Ferrari 059/3 1.6 V6 t	AUS	MAL	BHR	CHN	ESP	MON	CAN	AUT	GBR	GER	HUN	BEL	ITA	SIN	JPN	RUS; TD	USA	BRA	ABU			̶	̶
2016	Renault Sport F1 Team	Renault R.S.16	Renault R.E.16 1.6 V6 t	AUS	BHR	CHN	RUS; TD	ESP	MON	CAN	EUR	AUT	GBR	HUN	GER	BEL	ITA	SIN	MAL	JPN	USA	MEX	BRA; TD	ABU	̶	̶
2017	Renault Sport F1 Team	Renault R.S.17	Renault R.E.17 1.6 V6 t	AUS	CHN	BHR	RUS; TD	ESP; TD	MON	CAN	AZE	AUT; TD	GBR	HUN	BEL	ITA	SIN	MAL; TD	JPN	USA	MEX	BRA	ABU		̶	̶
2018	Williams Martini Racing	Williams FW41	Mercedes M09 EQ Power+ 1.6 V6 t	AUS; Ret	BHR; 15	CHN; 15	AZE; Ret	ESP; 14	MON; 16	CAN; 17	FRA; 15	AUT; 13	GBR; 14	GER; Ret	HUN; 16	BEL; 12	ITA; 10	SIN; 19	RUS; 18	JPN; 16	USA; 13	MEX; 13	BRA; 16	ABU; 15	20th	1

=== 24 Hours of Le Mans results ===
Year	Team	Co-drivers	Car	Class	Laps	Pos.	Class pos.
2017	(Russia) SMP Racing	(Russia) Mikhail Aleshin (Russia) Viktor Shaytar	Dallara P217-Gibson	LMP2	330	33rd	16th
2019	(Russia) SMP Racing	(Russia) Egor Orudzhev (France) Stéphane Sarrazin	BR Engineering BR1-AER	LMP1	163	DNF	DNF

=== Complete FIA World Endurance Championship results ===
Year	Entrant	Class	Chassis	Engine	1	2	3	4	5	6	7	8	Rank	Points
2018–19	SMP Racing	LMP1	BR Engineering BR1	AER P60B 2.4 L Turbo V6	SPA	LMS	SIL	FUJ	SHA	SEB; NC	SPA; 4	LMS; Ret	23rd	12

Sporting positions
Preceded by Brandon Maïsano; Formula Abarth	Formula Abarth European Series; Champion; 2011	Succeeded by Nicolas Costa
