= 2016 Sepang GP2 Series round =

(Malaysia) 2016 Sepang GP2 round
Round details
- Round 10 of 11 rounds in the 2016 GP2 Series
- Layout of the Sepang International Circuit
- Location: Sepang International Circuit, Kuala Lumpur, Malaysia
- Course: Permanent racing facility 5.543 km (3.444 mi)

GP2 Series

Feature race
- Date: 1 October 2016
- Laps: 29

Pole position
Driver	(France) Pierre Gasly	Prema Racing
- Time: 1:42.181

Podium
First	(Italy) Antonio Giovinazzi	Prema Racing
Second	(Russia) Sergey Sirotkin	ART Grand Prix
Third	(France) Norman Nato	Racing Engineering

Fastest lap
Driver	(Russia) Sergey Sirotkin	ART Grand Prix
- Time: 1:45.791 (on lap 10)

Sprint race
- Date: 2 October 2016
- Laps: 22

Podium
First	(Italy) Luca Ghiotto	Trident
Second	(Italy) Raffaele Marciello	Russian Time
Third	(France) Pierre Gasly	Prema Racing

Fastest lap
Driver	(France) Pierre Gasly	Prema Racing
- Time: 1:45.813 (on lap 18)

The 2016 Sepang GP2 Series round was a GP2 Series motor race held on 1 and 2 October 2016 at the Sepang International Circuit in Malaysia. It was the tenth round of the 2016 GP2 Series. The race weekend supported the 2016 Malaysian Grand Prix.

== Background ==
Johnny Cecotto Jr. made his return to GP2 for this round with the Rapax team, whilst Jimmy Eriksson pulled out of the round due to financial setbacks.

== Report ==
=== Qualifying ===
Pierre Gasly took another pole with teammate Antonio Giovinazzi in second making it another Prema Racing one-two for qualifying.

Pos.	No.	Driver	Team	Time	Gap	Grid
1	21	(France) Pierre Gasly	Prema Racing	1:42.181		1
2	20	(Italy) Antonio Giovinazzi	Prema Racing	1:42.263	+0.082	2
3	9	(Italy) Raffaele Marciello	Russian Time	1:42.526	+0.345	3
4	2	(Russia) Sergey Sirotkin	ART Grand Prix	1:42.528	+0.347	4
5	1	(Japan) Nobuharu Matsushita	ART Grand Prix	1:42.623	+0.442	5
6	5	(United Kingdom) Alex Lynn	DAMS	1:42.775	+0.594	6
7	3	(France) Norman Nato	Racing Engineering	1:42.800	+0.619	7
8	4	(United Kingdom) Jordan King	Racing Engineering	1:42.851	+0.670	8
9	22	(United Kingdom) Oliver Rowland	MP Motorsport	1:42.902	+0.721	9
10	10	(Russia) Artem Markelov	Russian Time	1:42.934	+0.753	10
11	15	(Italy) Luca Ghiotto	Trident	1:42.934	+0.753	11
12	6	(Canada) Nicholas Latifi	DAMS	1:43.130	+0.949	12
13	11	(Sweden) Gustav Malja	Rapax	1:43.224	+1.043	13
14	19	(Germany) Marvin Kirchhöfer	Carlin	1:43.290	+1.109	14
15	12	(Venezuela) Johnny Cecotto Jr.	Rapax	1:43.385	+1.204	15
16	7	(New Zealand) Mitch Evans	Campos Racing	1:43.606	+1.425	16
17	24	(Malaysia) Nabil Jeffri	Arden International	1:43.761	+1.580	17
18	23	(Netherlands) Daniël de Jong	MP Motorsport	1:43.965	+1.784	18
19	18	(Spain) Sergio Canamasas	Carlin	1:43.977	+1.796	19
20	8	(Indonesia) Sean Gelael	Campos Racing	1:44.087	+1.906	20
21	14	(Indonesia) Philo Paz Armand	Trident	1:44.578	+2.397	21

=== Feature Race ===
Pos.	No.	Driver	Constructor	Laps	Time/Retired	Grid	Points
1	20	(Italy) Antonio Giovinazzi	Prema Racing	29	52:18.049	2	25
2	2	(Russia) Sergey Sirotkin	ART Grand Prix	29	+5.858	4	18 (2)
3	3	(France) Norman Nato	Racing Engineering	29	+8.015	7	15
4	5	(United Kingdom) Alex Lynn	DAMS	29	+16.214	6	12
5	4	(United Kingdom) Jordan King	Racing Engineering	29	+18.742	8	10
6	9	(Italy) Raffaele Marciello	Russian Time	29	+20.694	3	8
7	15	(Italy) Luca Ghiotto	Trident	29	+24.964	11	6
8	7	(New Zealand) Mitch Evans	Campos Racing	29	+28.550	16	4
9	11	(Sweden) Gustav Malja	Rapax	29	+28.741	13	2
10	18	(Spain) Sergio Canamasas	Carlin	29	+33.209	19	1
11	21	(France) Pierre Gasly	Prema Racing	29	+35.538	1	(4)
12	22	(United Kingdom) Oliver Rowland	MP Motorsport	29	+35.550	9	
13	12	(Venezuela) Johnny Cecotto Jr.	Rapax	29	+35.703	15	
14	6	(Canada) Nicholas Latifi	DAMS	29	+41.169	12	
15	19	(Germany) Marvin Kirchhöfer	Carlin	29	+41.288	15	
16	8	(Indonesia) Sean Gelael	Campos Racing	29	+42.969	20	
17	23	(Netherlands) Daniël de Jong	MP Motorsport	29	+47.208	18	
18	24	(Malaysia) Nabil Jeffri	Arden International	29	+1:03.069	17	
19	14	(Indonesia) Philo Paz Armand	Trident	29	+1:06.464	21	
Ret	1	(Japan) Nobuharu Matsushita	ART Grand Prix	22	Retired	5	
DNS	10	(Russia) Artem Markelov	Russian Time	0	Did not start	10	
Fastest lap: (Russia) Sergey Sirotkin (ART Grand Prix) – 1:45.791 (on lap 10)

=== Sprint Race ===
Pos.	No.	Driver	Constructor	Laps	Time/Retired	Grid	Points
1	15	(Italy) Luca Ghiotto	Trident	22	40:22.211	2	15
2	9	(Italy) Raffaele Marciello	Russian Time	22	+0.694	3	12
3	21	(France) Pierre Gasly	Prema Racing	22	+4.786	11	10 (2)
4	20	(Italy) Antonio Giovinazzi	Prema Racing	22	+5.402	8	8
5	11	(Sweden) Gustav Malja	Rapax	22	+9.693	9	6
6	7	(New Zealand) Mitch Evans	Campos Racing	22	+13.333	1	4
7	1	(Japan) Nobuharu Matsushita	ART Grand Prix	22	+13.997	20	2
8	22	(United Kingdom) Oliver Rowland	MP Motorsport	22	+15.893	12	1
9	12	(Venezuela) Johnny Cecotto Jr.	Rapax	22	+17.623	13	
10	6	(Canada) Nicholas Latifi	DAMS	22	+24.245	14	
11	19	(Germany) Marvin Kirchhöfer	Carlin	22	+25.837	15	
12	5	(United Kingdom) Alex Lynn	DAMS	22	+27.198	5	
13	10	(Russia) Artem Markelov	Russian Time	22	+29.287	21	
14	4	(United Kingdom) Jordan King	Racing Engineering	22	+1:12.416	4	
15	18	(Spain) Sergio Canamasas	Carlin	22	+1:26.372	10	
Ret	14	(Indonesia) Philo Paz Armand	Trident	18	Retired	19	
Ret	24	(Malaysia) Nabil Jeffri	Arden International	18	Retired	18	
Ret	2	(Russia) Sergey Sirotkin	ART Grand Prix	13	Retired	7	
Ret	8	(Indonesia) Sean Gelael	Campos Racing	7	Retired	16	
Ret	3	(France) Norman Nato	Racing Engineering	1	Retired	6	
Ret	23	(Netherlands) Daniël de Jong	MP Motorsport	0	Retired	17	
Fastest lap: (France) Pierre Gasly (Prema Racing) – 1:45.813 (on lap 18)

== Standings after the round ==
Drivers' Championship standings

	Pos.	Driver	Points
1	1	(Italy) Antonio Giovinazzi	197
1	2	(France) Pierre Gasly	188
	3	(Italy) Raffaele Marciello	158
	4	(Russia) Sergey Sirotkin	135
	5	(United Kingdom) Jordan King	122

Teams' Championship standings

	Pos.	Team	Points
	1	(Italy) Prema Racing	385
1	2	(Spain) Racing Engineering	244
1	3	(Russia) Russian Time	240
	4	(France) ART Grand Prix	199
	5	(France) DAMS	126

- Note: Only the top five positions are included for both sets of standings.

== See also ==
- 2016 Malaysian Grand Prix
- 2016 Sepang GP3 Series round

Previous round: 2016 Monza GP2 Series round	GP2 Series; 2016 season	Next round: 2016 Yas Marina GP2 Series round
Previous round: 2013 Sepang GP2 Series round	Sepang GP2 round	Next round: None
