= 2016 Catalunya GP2 Series round =

2016 GP2 race held in Spain

(Spain) 2016 Catalunya GP2 round
Round details
- Round 1 of 11 rounds in the 2016 GP2 Series
- Layout of the Circuit de Catalunya
- Location: Circuit de Catalunya, Montmeló, Spain
- Course: Permanent racing facility 4.665 km (2.892 mi)

GP2 Series

Feature race
- Date: 14 May 2016
- Laps: 33

Pole position
Driver	(France) Pierre Gasly	Prema Racing
- Time: 1:27.807

Podium
First	(France) Norman Nato	Racing Engineering
Second	(Canada) Nicholas Latifi	DAMS
Third	(France) Pierre Gasly	Prema Racing

Fastest lap
Driver	(France) Norman Nato	Racing Engineering
- Time: 1:34.050 (on lap 28)

Sprint race
- Date: 15 May 2016
- Laps: 26

Podium
First	(United Kingdom) Alex Lynn	DAMS
Second	(France) Pierre Gasly	Prema Racing
Third	(United Kingdom) Jordan King	Racing Engineering

Fastest lap
Driver	(France) Pierre Gasly	Prema Racing
- Time: 1:33.263 (on lap 6)

The 2016 Catalunya GP2 Series round was a GP2 Series motor race on 14 and 15 May 2016 at the Circuit de Catalunya in Spain. It was the first round of the 2016 GP2 Series. The race weekend supported the 2016 Spanish Grand Prix.

== Background ==
The defending champions for GP2, Stoffel Vandoorne, were unable to defend their respective titles due to the ruling which forbids driver champions from returning to the series. Vandoorne remained as a McLaren reserve and test driver, where he stood in for the injured Fernando Alonso at the Bahrain Grand Prix, while also racing in the Super Formula series in Japan.

== Classification ==
=== Qualifying ===
A dramatic qualifying session saw Pierre Gasly take his first pole position of the season, his third in a row dating back to last season, and the fourth in his GP2 career. It was also the first pole position for Prema Racing, which they scored on their debut in the GP2 Series. Norman Nato grabbed his best-ever qualifying position in GP2 with a strong second place, with Alex Lynn behind in third.

Pos.	No.	Driver	Team	Time	Grid
1	21	(France) Pierre Gasly	Prema Racing	1:27.807	1
2	3	(France) Norman Nato	Racing Engineering	1:28.271	2
3	5	(United Kingdom) Alex Lynn	DAMS	1:28.458	3
4	6	(Canada) Nicholas Latifi	DAMS	1:28.563	4
5	2	(Russia) Sergey Sirotkin	ART Grand Prix	1:28.655	5
6	11	(Sweden) Gustav Malja	Rapax	1:28.695	6
7	22	(United Kingdom) Oliver Rowland	MP Motorsport	1:28.807	7
8	1	(Japan) Nobuharu Matsushita	ART Grand Prix	1:29.128	11^{1}
9	10	(Russia) Artem Markelov	Russian Time	1:29.129	8
10	15	(Italy) Luca Ghiotto	Trident	1:29.143	9
11	20	(Italy) Antonio Giovinazzi	Prema Racing	1:29.163	10
12	9	(Italy) Raffaele Marciello	Russian Time	1:29.274	12
13	4	(United Kingdom) Jordan King	Racing Engineering	1:29.322	13
14	12	(France) Arthur Pic	Rapax	1:29.385	14
15	18	(Spain) Sergio Canamasas	Carlin	1:29.397	15
16	19	(Germany) Marvin Kirchhöfer	Carlin	1:29.440	16
17	23	(Netherlands) Daniël de Jong	MP Motorsport	1:29.464	17
18	7	(New Zealand) Mitch Evans	Pertamina Campos Racing	1:29.478	18
19	25	(Sweden) Jimmy Eriksson	Arden International	1:29.942	19
20	24	(Malaysia) Nabil Jeffri	Arden International	1:30.254	20
21	8	(Indonesia) Sean Gelael	Pertamina Campos Racing	1:30.304	22^{2}
22	14	(Indonesia) Philo Paz Armand	Trident	1:30.609	21

1. – Matsushita received a three-place grid penalty for impeding a rival during the qualifying session.
2. – Gelael received a three-place grid penalty for impeding a rival during the qualifying session. However, since he was unable to serve his penalty in full, Gelael started from the pitlane.

=== Feature Race ===
Pierre Gasly got a good getaway from pole position, followed by Nato and the fast-starting ART car of Sergey Sirotkin. However, the safety car was called out when rookie Luca Ghiotto crashed at Turn 3. The restart on Lap 5 saw no positional changes up front. Soft-shod Alex Lynn and Jordan King started the pit stop cycle, but Gasly's blistering pace out front eradicated any potential strategic advantage. The battle for second raged on, with Nato holding off a charging Sirotkin. But Sirotkin's race quickly unravelled when he spun in Turn 2 on Lap 23 and stalled the engine, a rare mistake from the Russian driver. The safety car came out once again while Sirotkin's stricken car was retrieved. This proved advantageous for the drivers on the hard tyre, as they were awarded a "free" pit stop under the safety car. As such, Gasly, Nato, Nicholas Latifi, and Sergio Canamasas all emerged in front of Lynn.

The race restarted again on Lap 26, and this time, there were moves aplenty. Artem Markelov jumped ahead of both Lynn and King for P5, before Nato made a brave race-winning move in the final complex of corners to take the lead. Shortly after, the race became time-certain, which spurred on drivers to make more moves. Latifi passed Gasly on Lap 33 to claim second, while Markelov continued his charge to the front by deposing Canamasas for fourth.

The race ended under a bizarre set of circumstances: Prema Racing's Antonio Giovinazzi clattered into the back of Raffaele Marciello on Lap 34, sending him into the Turn 4 gravel. The safety car came out for the third time, with time running out just before the field crossed the line. Under GP2 rules, there is always one lap after the time runs out, but despite this rule, the checkered flag was accidentally waved one lap too early. Because of race control's gaffe, the results were rolled back to one lap before, which annulled the accident between Marciello and Giovinazzi. However, Giovinazzi was still awarded a twenty-second time penalty which relegated him to an 18th-place finish.

Pos.	No.	Driver	Team	Laps	Time/Retired	Grid	Points
1	3	(France) Norman Nato	Racing Engineering	33	58:51.044	2	25 (2)
2	6	(Canada) Nicholas Latifi	DAMS	33	+1:337	4	18
3	21	(France) Pierre Gasly	Prema Racing	33	+4.248	1	15 (4)
4	10	(Russia) Artem Markelov	Russian Time	33	+5.145	8	12
5	18	(Spain) Sergio Canamasas	Carlin	33	+7.294	15	10
6	5	(United Kingdom) Alex Lynn	DAMS	33	+7.596	3	8
7	4	(United Kingdom) Jordan King	Racing Engineering	33	+8.678	13	6
8	9	(Italy) Raffaele Marciello	Russian Time	33	+11.544	12	4
9	11	(Sweden) Gustav Malja	Rapax	33	+13.102	6	2
10	22	(United Kingdom) Oliver Rowland	MP Motorsport	33	+17.513	7	1
11	1	(Japan) Nobuharu Matsushita	ART Grand Prix	33	+18.526	11	
12	7	(New Zealand) Mitch Evans	Pertamina Campos Racing	33	+21.773	18	
13	12	(France) Arthur Pic	Rapax	33	+23.022	14	
14	23	(Netherlands) Daniël de Jong	MP Motorsport	33	+23.787	17	
15	19	(Germany) Marvin Kirchhöfer	Carlin	33	+24.125	16	
16	25	(Sweden) Jimmy Eriksson	Arden International	33	+24.348	19	
17	8	(Indonesia) Sean Gelael	Pertamina Campos Racing	33	+27.522	PL	
18	20	(Italy) Antonio Giovinazzi	Prema Racing	32	+1 Lap	10	
19	24	(Malaysia) Nabil Jeffri	Arden International	32	+1 Lap	20	
Ret	14	(Indonesia) Philo Paz Armand	Trident	28	Mechanical	21	
Ret	2	(Russia) Sergey Sirotkin	ART Grand Prix	23	Spun off	5	
Ret	15	(Italy) Luca Ghiotto	Trident	0	Accident	9	
Fastest lap: (France) Norman Nato (Racing Engineering) – 1:34.050 (on lap 28)

=== Sprint Race ===
Reverse-grid polesitter Raffaele Marciello got a clean start, holding off Jordan King into the first corner, but Alex Lynn got a great start from third and passed King into turn 2. It took Lynn merely two laps to catch and sail past Marciello, setting the Briton up for a dominant drive to victory. Behind him, Marciello plummeted to fourth, being passed by King and Pierre Gasly in quick succession. Gasly then overtook King for second on Lap 6 and set off in pursuit of his former teammate. Positions remained at the front of the field, but it was all change in the middle of the pack. Sergey Sirotkin and Luca Ghiotto chewed through almost half the field from their last-row starting positions.

The intense midfield battle came to an abrupt end on Lap 21, when Sean Gelael aggressively blocked Antonio Giovinazzi on the back straight, but Giovinazzi was already partially alongside the Indonesian driver. He was launched over Gelael's left-rear wheel and slid down the remainder of the straight, collecting an innocent Arthur Pic in Turn 10. Giovinazzi hurtled towards the barriers at unabated speed, skipping across the gravel before slamming the tyre wall side-on. He climbed out of his car visibly shaken, but otherwise uninjured, which was positive news after such a violent impact. The safety car was deployed, but a lengthy clean-up meant that it could only be recalled on the final lap. As a result, Lynn was able to take a second consecutive Spanish sprint race victory, while Gasly, King, Artem Markelov, Marciello, Oliver Rowland, Nicholas Latifi, and Nobuharu Matsushita also claimed points.

Pos.	No.	Driver	Team	Laps	Time/Retired	Grid	Points
1	5	(United Kingdom) Alex Lynn	DAMS	26	43:50.241	3	15
2	21	(France) Pierre Gasly	Prema Racing	26	+0.377	6	12 (2)
3	4	(United Kingdom) Jordan King	Racing Engineering	26	+1.120	2	10
4	10	(Russia) Artem Markelov	Russian Time	26	+2.168	5	8
5	9	(Italy) Raffaele Marciello	Russian Time	26	+3.382	1	6
6	22	(United Kingdom) Oliver Rowland	MP Motorsport	26	+3.990	10	4
7	6	(Canada) Nicholas Latifi	DAMS	26	+4.584	7	2
8	1	(Japan) Nobuharu Matsushita	ART Grand Prix	26	+5.647	11	1
9	18	(Spain) Sergio Canamasas	Carlin	26	+8.115	4	
10	11	(Sweden) Gustav Malja	Rapax	26	+8.419	9	
11	2	(Russia) Sergey Sirotkin	ART Grand Prix	26	+8.698	21	
12	15	(Italy) Luca Ghiotto	Trident	26	+8.828	22	
13	8	(Indonesia) Sean Gelael	Pertamina Campos Racing	26	+9.178	17	
14	7	(New Zealand) Mitch Evans	Pertamina Campos Racing	26	+9.650	12	
15	19	(Germany) Marvin Kirchhöfer	Carlin	26	+10.152	15	
16	3	(France) Norman Nato	Racing Engineering	26	+10.430	8	
17	23	(Netherlands) Daniël de Jong	MP Motorsport	26	+10.726	14	
18	24	(Malaysia) Nabil Jeffri	Arden International	26	+11.672	19	
19	25	(Sweden) Jimmy Eriksson	Arden International	25	+1 Lap	16	
Ret	12	(France) Arthur Pic	Rapax	20	Collision	13	
Ret	20	(Italy) Antonio Giovinazzi	Prema Racing	20	Accident	18	
Ret	14	(Indonesia) Philo Paz Armand	Trident	13	Retired	20	
Fastest lap: (France) Pierre Gasly (Prema Racing) – 1:33.263 (on lap 6)

== Standings after the round ==
Drivers' Championship standings

Pos	Driver	Points
1	(France) Pierre Gasly	33
2	(France) Norman Nato	27
3	(United Kingdom) Alex Lynn	23
4	(Canada) Nicholas Latifi	20
5	(Russia) Artem Markelov	20

Teams' Championship standings

Pos	Team	Points
1	(France) DAMS	43
2	(Spain) Racing Engineering	43
3	(Italy) Prema Racing	31
4	(Russia) Russian Time	30
5	(United Kingdom) Carlin	10

- Note: Only the top five positions are included for both sets of standings.

== See also ==
- 2016 Spanish Grand Prix
- 2016 Catalunya GP3 Series round

Previous round: 2015 Yas Marina GP2 Series round	GP2 Series; 2016 season	Next round: 2016 Monaco GP2 Series round
Previous round: 2015 Catalunya GP2 Series round	Catalunya GP2 round	Next round: 2017 Barcelona Formula 2 round
