= 2016 Spa-Francorchamps GP2 Series round =

Motor race in Belgium

(Belgium) 2016 Spa-Francorchamps GP2 round
Round details
- Round 8 of 11 rounds in the 2016 GP2 Series
- Layout of the Circuit de Spa-Francorchamps
- Location: Circuit de Spa-Francorchamps, Francorchamps, Belgium
- Course: Permanent racing facility 7.004 km (4.352 mi)

GP2 Series

Feature race
- Date: 27 August 2016
- Laps: 25

Pole position
Driver	(Italy) Antonio Giovinazzi	Prema Racing
- Time: 1:56.607

Podium
First	(France) Pierre Gasly	Prema Racing
Second	(United Kingdom) Jordan King	Racing Engineering
Third	(United Kingdom) Alex Lynn	DAMS

Fastest lap
Driver	(Russia) Artem Markelov	Russian Time
- Time: 2:01.187 (on lap 24)

Sprint race
- Date: 28 August 2016
- Laps: 18

Podium
First	(Italy) Antonio Giovinazzi	Prema Racing
Second	(Sweden) Gustav Malja	Rapax
Third	(Italy) Luca Ghiotto	Trident

Fastest lap
Driver	(Italy) Antonio Giovinazzi	Prema Racing
- Time: 2:01.329 (on lap 2)

The 2016 Spa-Francorchamps GP2 Series round was a GP2 Series motor race held on 27 and 28 August 2016 at the Circuit de Spa-Francorchamps in Belgium. It was the eighth round of the 2016 GP2 Series. The race weekend supported the 2016 Belgian Grand Prix.

== Background ==
Sergio Canamasas announced his return to Carlin for the round, replacing René Binder

== Report ==
=== Qualifying ===
Antonio Giovinazzi led a Prema Racing 1-2 in qualifying, once again showcasing Prema's run of dominance in GP2 as of late. Gustav Malja proved the surprise candidate for third, albeit half a second adrift of Giovinazzi.

Pos.	No.	Driver	Team	Time	Gap	Grid
1	20	(Italy) Antonio Giovinazzi	Prema Racing	1:56.607	–	1
2	21	(France) Pierre Gasly	Prema Racing	1:56.768	+0.161	2
3	11	(Sweden) Gustav Malja	Rapax	1:57.124	+0.517	3
4	3	(France) Norman Nato	Racing Engineering	1:57.211	+0.604	4
5	4	(United Kingdom) Jordan King	Racing Engineering	1:57.411	+0.804	5
6	12	(France) Arthur Pic	Rapax	1:57.462	+0.855	6
7	9	(Italy) Raffaele Marciello	Russian Time	1:57.512	+0.905	7
8	5	(United Kingdom) Alex Lynn	DAMS	1:57.658	+1.051	8
9	1	(Japan) Nobuharu Matsushita	ART Grand Prix	1:57.665	+1.058	9
10	19	(Germany) Marvin Kirchhöfer	Carlin	1:57.750	+1.143	10
11	6	(Canada) Nicholas Latifi	DAMS	1:57.768	+1.161	11
12	10	(Russia) Artem Markelov	Russian Time	1:57.906	+1.299	12
13	2	(Russia) Sergey Sirotkin	ART Grand Prix	1:57.927	+1.320	13
14	15	(Italy) Luca Ghiotto	Trident	1:57.964	+1.357	14
15	22	(United Kingdom) Oliver Rowland	MP Motorsport	1:57.987	+1.380	15
16	18	(Spain) Sergio Canamasas	Carlin	1:58.165	+1.558	16
17	8	(Indonesia) Sean Gelael	Campos Racing	1:58.252	+1.645	17
18	23	(Netherlands) Daniel de Jong	MP Motorsport	1:58.342	+1.735	18
19	7	(New Zealand) Mitch Evans	Campos Racing	1:58.386	+1.779	19
20	25	(Sweden) Jimmy Eriksson	Arden International	1:58.674	+2.067	20
21	24	(Malaysia) Nabil Jeffri	Arden International	1:59.292	+2.685	22^{1}
22	14	(Indonesia) Philo Paz Armand	Trident	1:59.577	+2.970	21

Notes
1. – Jeffri was given a grid penalty from the previous round in Hockenheim, after having been deemed to have caused a collision.

=== Feature Race ===
Pierre Gasly took another win with a dominant performance and with rival Sergey Sirotkin absent from the podium, he stretched his lead in the standings. Brits Jordan King and Alex Lynn took second and third respectively, comfortably ahead of the Russian Time pair of Raffaele Marciello and Artem Markelov

Pos.	No.	Driver	Team	Laps	Time/Retired	Grid	Points
1	21	(France) Pierre Gasly	Prema Racing	25	53:00.853	2	25
2	4	(United Kingdom) Jordan King	Racing Engineering	25	+11.262	5	18
3	5	(United Kingdom) Alex Lynn	DAMS	25	+15.519	8	15
4	9	(Italy) Raffaele Marciello	Russian Time	25	+19.163	7	12
5	10	(Russia) Artem Markelov	Russian Time	25	+20.723	12	10 (2)
6	20	(Italy) Antonio Giovinazzi	Prema Racing	25	+24.616	1	8 (4)
7	15	(Italy) Luca Ghiotto	Trident	25	+28.703	14	6
8	11	(Sweden) Gustav Malja	Rapax	25	+32.404	3	4
9	2	(Russia) Sergey Sirotkin	ART Grand Prix	25	+35.778	13	2
10	22	(United Kingdom) Oliver Rowland	MP Motorsport	25	+36.489	15	1
11	1	(Japan) Nobuharu Matsushita	ART Grand Prix	25	+36.620	9	
12	18	(Spain) Sergio Canamasas	Carlin	25	+36.819	16	
13	6	(Canada) Nicholas Latifi	DAMS	25	+41.909	11	
14	12	(France) Arthur Pic	Rapax	25	+46.297	6	
15	25	(Sweden) Jimmy Eriksson	Arden International	25	+47.842	20	
16	7	(New Zealand) Mitch Evans	Campos Racing	25	+51.263	19	
17	23	(Netherlands) Daniel de Jong	MP Motorsport	25	+59.821	18	
18	8	(Indonesia) Sean Gelael	Campos Racing	25	+1:10.120	17	
19	24	(Malaysia) Nabil Jeffri	Arden International	25	+1:11.915	22	
20	14	(Indonesia) Philo Paz Armand	Trident	25	+1:35.380	21	
Ret	3	(France) Norman Nato	Racing Engineering	18	Collision damage	4	
Ret	19	(Germany) Marvin Kirchhöfer	Carlin	1	Collision damage	10	
Fastest lap: (Russia) Artem Markelov (Russian Time) – 2:01.187 (on lap 24)

=== Sprint Race ===
Antonio Giovinazzi took the sprint race win to complete a dominant weekend for the Prema Racing outfit. Gustav Malja finished in second to record his best finish in GP2 and Luca Ghiotto achieved third for the Trident team.

Pos.	No.	Driver	Team	Laps	Time/Retired	Grid	Points
1	20	(Italy) Antonio Giovinazzi	Prema Racing	18	36:48.422	3	15 (2)
2	11	(Sweden) Gustav Malja	Rapax	18	+2.359	1	12
3	15	(Italy) Luca Ghiotto	Trident	18	+3.921	2	10
4	21	(France) Pierre Gasly	Prema Racing	18	+4.479	8	8
5	9	(Italy) Raffaele Marciello	Russian Time	18	+6.634	5	6
6	22	(United Kingdom) Oliver Rowland	MP Motorsport	18	+13.133	10	4
7	18	(Spain) Sergio Canamasas	Carlin	18	+16.274	12	2
8	3	(France) Norman Nato	Racing Engineering	18	+17.011	21	1
9	6	(Canada) Nicholas Latifi	DAMS	18	+18.821	13	
10	5	(United Kingdom) Alex Lynn	DAMS	18	+19.045^{1}	6	
11	1	(Japan) Nobuharu Matsushita	ART Grand Prix	18	+20.170	11	
12	4	(United Kingdom) Jordan King	Racing Engineering	18	+20.458^{2}	7	
13	7	(New Zealand) Mitch Evans	Campos Racing	18	+20.713	16	
14	19	(Germany) Marvin Kirchhöfer	Carlin	18	+24.657	22	
15	8	(Indonesia) Sean Gelael	Campos Racing	18	+34.203	18	
16	2	(Russia) Sergey Sirotkin	ART Grand Prix	18	+35.557^{3}	9	
17	23	(Netherlands) Daniël de Jong	MP Motorsport	18	+35.989^{4}	17	
18	24	(Malaysia) Nabil Jeffri	Arden International	18	+41.645^{5}	19	
19	14	(Indonesia) Philo Paz Armand	Trident	18	+43.500	20	
20	25	(Sweden) Jimmy Eriksson	Arden International	18	+1:36.962^{6}	15	
21	12	(France) Arthur Pic	Rapax	17	+1 Lap^{7}	14	
NC	10	(Russia) Artem Markelov	Russian Time	17	Collision	4	
Fastest lap: (Italy) Antonio Giovinazzi (Prema Racing) – 2:01.329 (on lap 2)

Notes
1. – Lynn, King, Pic, de Jong, Jeffri, Erikkson and Sirotkin were all given ten-second penalties after being found guilty of using their DRS on lap one.

== Standings after the round ==
Drivers' Championship standings

	Pos.	Driver	Points
1	1	(France) Pierre Gasly	144
2	2	(Italy) Antonio Giovinazzi	129
	3	(Italy) Raffaele Marciello	120
3	4	(Russia) Sergey Sirotkin	115
	5	(United Kingdom) Oliver Rowland	104

Teams' Championship standings

	Pos.	Team	Points
	1	(Italy) Prema Racing	273
1	2	(Russia) Russian Time	199
1	3	(Spain) Racing Engineering	180
2	4	(France) ART Grand Prix	173
	5	(Netherlands) MP Motorsport	110

- Note: Only the top five positions are included for both sets of standings.

== See also ==
- 2016 Belgian Grand Prix
- 2016 Spa-Francorchamps GP3 Series round

Previous round: 2016 Hockenheimring GP2 Series round	GP2 Series; 2016 season	Next round: 2016 Monza GP2 Series round
Previous round: 2015 Spa-Francorchamps GP2 Series round	Spa-Francorchamps GP2 round	Next round: 2017 Spa-Francorchamps Formula 2 round
