= 2016 Hungaroring GP2 Series round =

Motor race in Hungary

(Hungary) 2016 Hungaroring GP2 round
Round details
- Round 6 of 11 rounds in the 2016 GP2 Series
- Layout of the Hungaroring
- Location: Hungaroring, Mogyoród, Pest, Hungary
- Course: Permanent racing facility 4.381 km (2.722 mi)

GP2 Series

Feature race
- Date: 23 July 2016
- Laps: 37

Pole position
Driver	(France) Pierre Gasly	Prema Racing
- Time: 1:25.612

Podium
First	(France) Pierre Gasly	Prema Racing
Second	(Italy) Antonio Giovinazzi	Prema Racing
Third	(Russia) Sergey Sirotkin	ART Grand Prix

Fastest lap
Driver	(Japan) Nobuharu Matsushita	ART Grand Prix
- Time: 1:29.959 (on lap 36)

Sprint race
- Date: 24 July 2016
- Laps: 28

Podium
First	(Russia) Sergey Sirotkin	ART Grand Prix
Second	(United Kingdom) Jordan King	Racing Engineering
Third	(France) Norman Nato	Racing Engineering

Fastest lap
Driver	(France) Pierre Gasly	Prema Racing
- Time: 1:29.184 (on lap 27)

The 2016 Hungaroring GP2 Series round was a GP2 Series motor race held on 23 and 24 July 2016 at the Hungaroring in Mogyoród, Pest, Hungary. It was the sixth round of the 2016 GP2 Series. The race weekend supported the 2016 Hungarian Grand Prix.

== Report ==
=== Qualifying ===
Pierre Gasly secured his second pole position of the year in dominant fashion. With a time of 1:25.612, Gasly was over half a second faster than nearest competitor, Sergey Sirotkin. Prema Racing team-mate, Antonio Giovinazzi achieved third with a time eight-tenths adrift of Gasly's time.

Pos.	No.	Driver	Team	Time	Grid
1	21	(France) Pierre Gasly	Prema Racing	1:25.612	1
2	2	(Russia) Sergey Sirotkin	ART Grand Prix	1:26.182	2
3	20	(Italy) Antonio Giovinazzi	Prema Racing	1:26.438	3
4	1	(Japan) Nobuharu Matsushita	ART Grand Prix	1:26.483	4
5	3	(France) Norman Nato	Racing Engineering	1:26.521	5
6	15	(Italy) Luca Ghiotto	Trident	1:26.557	6
7	12	(France) Arthur Pic	Rapax	1:26.633	7
8	9	(Italy) Raffaele Marciello	Russian Time	1:26.657	8
9	4	(United Kingdom) Jordan King	Racing Engineering	1:26.667	9
10	19	(Germany) Marvin Kirchhöfer	Carlin	1:26.696	10
11	5	(United Kingdom) Alex Lynn	DAMS	1:26.795	11
12	6	(Canada) Nicholas Latifi	DAMS	1:26.819	12
13	11	(Sweden) Gustav Malja	Rapax	1:26.911	13
14	7	(New Zealand) Mitch Evans	Campos Racing	1:26.966	14
15	10	(Russia) Artem Markelov	Russian Time	1:27.068	15
16	18	(Spain) Sergio Canamasas	Carlin	1:27.078	16
17	22	(United Kingdom) Oliver Rowland	MP Motorsport	1:27.176	17
18	23	(Netherlands) Daniël de Jong	MP Motorsport	1:27.207	18
19	8	(Indonesia) Sean Gelael	Campos Racing	1:27.246	19
20	25	(Sweden) Jimmy Eriksson	Arden International	1:27.908	20
21	14	(Malaysia) Nabil Jeffri	Arden International	1:28.119	21
22	14	(Indonesia) Philo Paz Armand	Trident	1:28.415	22

=== Feature Race ===
Gasly took his second win of the season from Sergey Sirotkin and Antonio Giovinazzi.

Pos.	No.	Driver	Team	Laps	Time/Retired	Grid	Points
1	21	(France) Pierre Gasly	Prema Racing	36	55:29.672	1	25 (4)
2	20	(Italy) Antonio Giovinazzi	Prema Racing	36	+1.365	3	18
3	2	(Russia) Sergey Sirotkin	ART Grand Prix	36	+2.835	2	15
4	9	(Italy) Raffaele Marciello	Russian Time	36	+7.616	8	12
5	12	(France) Arthur Pic	Rapax	36	+9.908	7	10
6	1	(Japan) Nobuharu Matsushita	ART Grand Prix	36	+12.861	4	8 (2)
7	3	(France) Norman Nato	Racing Engineering	36	+17.713	5	6
8	4	(United Kingdom) Jordan King	Racing Engineering	36	+21.906	9	4
9	10	(Russia) Artem Markelov	Russian Time	29	+22.101	15	2
10	7	(New Zealand) Mitch Evans	Campos Racing	36	+23.980	14	1
11	22	(United Kingdom) Oliver Rowland	MP Motorsport	36	+29.377	17	
12	5	(United Kingdom) Alex Lynn	DAMS	36	+34.050	11	
13	11	(Sweden) Gustav Malja	Rapax	36	+34.197	13	
14	19	(Germany) Marvin Kirchhöfer	Carlin	36	+36.420	10	
15	23	(Netherlands) Daniël de Jong	MP Motorsport	36	+38.526	18	
16	6	(Canada) Nicholas Latifi	DAMS	36	+42.371	12	
17	15	(Italy) Luca Ghiotto	Trident	36	+51.757	6	
18	18	(Spain) Sergio Canamasas	Carlin	36	+1:03.546	16	
19	14	(Indonesia) Philo Paz Armand	Trident	36	+1:25.151	22	
20	24	(Malaysia) Nabil Jeffri	Arden International	36	+1:28.055	21	
21	25	(Sweden) Jimmy Eriksson	Arden International	35	+1 Lap	20	
22	8	(Indonesia) Sean Gelael	Campos Racing	35	+1 Lap	19	
Fastest lap: (Japan) Nobuharu Matsushita (ART Grand Prix) – 1:29.959 (on lap 36)

=== Sprint Race ===
Sirotkin controlled the race to take his first win of the season from the Racing Engineering pair of Jordan King and Norman Nato.

Pos.	No.	Driver	Team	Laps	Time/Retired	Grid	Points
1	2	(Russia) Sergey Sirotkin	ART Grand Prix	28	44:47.059	6	15
2	4	(United Kingdom) Jordan King	Racing Engineering	28	+4.953	1	12
3	3	(France) Norman Nato	Racing Engineering	28	+7.506	2	10
4	10	(Russia) Artem Markelov	Russian Time	28	+8.988	9	8
5	7	(New Zealand) Mitch Evans	Campos Racing	28	+14.146	10	6
6	22	(United Kingdom) Oliver Rowland	MP Motorsport	28	+15.283	11	4
7	21	(France) Pierre Gasly	Prema Racing	28	+16.662	8	2 (2)
8	9	(Italy) Raffaele Marciello	Russian Time	28	+20.939	5	1
9	18	(Spain) Sergio Canamasas	Carlin	28	+25.985	18	
10	8	(Indonesia) Sean Gelael	Campos Racing	28	+30.884	22	
11	23	(Netherlands) Daniël de Jong	MP Motorsport	28	+32.518	15	
12	6	(Canada) Nicholas Latifi	DAMS	28	+35.100	16	
13	19	(Germany) Marvin Kirchhöfer	Carlin	28	+36.913	14	
14	11	(Sweden) Gustav Malja	Rapax	28	+39.660	13	
15	14	(Indonesia) Philo Paz Armand	Jenzer Motorsport	28	+46.412	19	
16	24	(Malaysia) Nabil Jeffri	Arden International	28	+1:00.825	20	
17	20	(Italy) Antonio Giovinazzi	Prema Racing	27	Engine	7	
Ret	25	(Sweden) Jimmy Eriksson	Arden International	14	Gearbox	21	
Ret	1	(Japan) Nobuharu Matsushita	ART Grand Prix	0	Collision	3	
Ret	15	(Italy) Luca Ghiotto	Trident	0	Collision	17	
Ret	12	(France) Arthur Pic	Rapax	0	Collision	4	
Ret	5	(United Kingdom) Alex Lynn	DAMS	0	Collision	12	
Fastest lap: (France) Pierre Gasly (Prema Racing) – 1:29.184 (on lap 27)

== Standings after the round ==
Drivers' Championship standings

	Pos	Driver	Points
2	1	(France) Pierre Gasly	107
	2	(Italy) Antonio Giovinazzi	96
1	3	(Italy) Raffaele Marciello	85
3	4	(United Kingdom) Oliver Rowland	83
1	5	(France) Norman Nato	81

Teams' Championship standings

	Pos	Team	Points
	1	(Italy) Prema Racing	203
	2	(Spain) Racing Engineering	151
	3	(Russia) Russian Time	150
1	4	(France) ART Grand Prix	126
1	5	(Indonesia) Campos Racing	99

- Note: Only the top five positions are included for both sets of standings.

== See also ==
- 2016 Hungarian Grand Prix
- 2016 Hungaroring GP3 Series round

Previous round: 2016 Silverstone GP2 Series round	GP2 Series; 2016 season	Next round: 2016 Hockenheimring GP2 Series round
Previous round: 2015 Hungaroring GP2 Series round	Hungaroring GP2 round	Next round: 2017 Hungaroring Formula 2 round
