= 2016 Yas Marina GP2 Series round =

Motor racing event

(United Arab Emirates) 2016 Yas Marina GP2 round
Round details
- Round 11 of 11 rounds in the 2016 GP2 Series
- Layout of the Yas Marina Circuit
- Location: Yas Marina Circuit, Abu Dhabi, United Arab Emirates
- Course: Permanent racing facility 5.554 km (3.451 mi)

GP2 Series

Feature race
- Date: 26 November 2016
- Laps: 31

Pole position
Driver	(France) Pierre Gasly	Prema Racing
- Time: 1:47.476

Podium
First	(France) Pierre Gasly	Prema Racing
Second	(Japan) Nobuharu Matsushita	ART Grand Prix
Third	(Russia) Artem Markelov	Russian Time

Fastest lap
Driver	(Japan) Nobuharu Matsushita	ART Grand Prix
- Time: 1:51.175 (on lap 28)

Sprint race
- Date: 27 November 2016
- Laps: 22

Podium
First	(United Kingdom) Alex Lynn	DAMS
Second	(Venezuela) Johnny Cecotto Jr.	Rapax
Third	(Russia) Sergey Sirotkin	ART Grand Prix

Fastest lap
Driver	(Russia) Sergey Sirotkin	ART Grand Prix
- Time: 1:52.863 (on lap 14)

The 2016 Yas Marina GP2 Series round was a GP2 Series motor race held on 26 and 27 November 2016 at the Yas Marina Circuit in the United Arab Emirates. It was the final round of the 2016 GP2 Series. The race weekend supported the 2016 Abu Dhabi Grand Prix.

This was the final round run with the "GP2 Series" name, as the championship was rebranded as the FIA Formula 2 Championship from 2017. It was also originally planned to be the final race for the Dallara GP2/11 chassis that was first introduced in 2011 and the Mecachrome 4.0 litre V8 normally-aspirated engine package that had been used since the inaugural season of the series in 2005, before a new chassis and engine package was introduced for 2017, but both the current chassis and engine package had their services extended for one more season.

== Background ==
Carlin announced that Louis Delétraz would be replacing Marvin Kirchhöfer for the final round in Abu Dhabi. As well as Carlin, Arden International also announced that Emil Bernstorff would be replacing Jimmy Eriksson.

== Classification ==
=== Qualifying ===
Pierre Gasly took a crucial pole position which would help his bid to win the 2016 GP2 Series, with closest rival, Antonio Giovinazzi qualifying in sixth place.

Pos.	No.	Driver	Team	Time	Gap	Grid
1	21	(France) Pierre Gasly	Prema Racing	1:47.476		1
2	2	(Russia) Sergey Sirotkin	ART Grand Prix	1:47.804	+0.328	2
3	10	(Russia) Artem Markelov	Russian Time	1:47.901	+0.425	3
4	1	(Japan) Nobuharu Matsushita	ART Grand Prix	1:47.997	+0.521	4
5	22	(United Kingdom) Oliver Rowland	MP Motorsport	1:48.130	+0.654	5
6	20	(Italy) Antonio Giovinazzi	Prema Racing	1:48.288	+0.812	6
7	3	(France) Norman Nato	Racing Engineering	1:48.307	+0.831	7
8	9	(Italy) Raffaele Marciello	Russian Time	1:48.368	+0.892	8
9	5	(United Kingdom) Alex Lynn	DAMS	1:48.524	+1.048	9
10	7	(New Zealand) Mitch Evans	Campos Racing	1:48.559	+1.083	10
11	4	(United Kingdom) Jordan King	Racing Engineering	1:48.712	+1.236	11
12	15	(Italy) Luca Ghiotto	Trident	1:48.830	+1.354	12
13	12	(Venezuela) Johnny Cecotto Jr.	Rapax	1:48.976	+1.500	13
14	6	(Canada) Nicholas Latifi	DAMS	1:49.075	+1.599	14
15	11	(Sweden) Gustav Malja	Rapax	1:49.206	+1.730	15
16	18	(Spain) Sergio Canamasas	Carlin	1:49.779	+2.303	16
17	14	(Indonesia) Philo Paz Armand	Trident	1:49.950	+2.474	17
18	24	(Malaysia) Nabil Jeffri	Arden International	1:50.135	+2.659	18
19	8	(Indonesia) Sean Gelael	Campos Racing	1:50.233	+2.757	19
20	19	(Switzerland) Louis Delétraz	Carlin	1:50.234	+2.758	20
21	23	(Netherlands) Daniël de Jong	MP Motorsport	1:50.276	+2.800	21
22	25	(United Kingdom) Emil Bernstorff	Arden International	1:50.470	+2.994	22

=== Feature Race ===
Pos.	No.	Driver	Constructor	Laps	Time/Retired	Grid	Points
1	21	(France) Pierre Gasly	Prema Racing	31	59:14.764	1	25 (4)
2	1	(Japan) Nobuharu Matsushita	ART Grand Prix	31	+6.737	4	18 (2)
3	10	(Russia) Artem Markelov	Russian Time	31	+11.309	3	15
4	2	(Russia) Sergey Sirotkin	ART Grand Prix	31	+14.111	2	12
5	20	(Italy) Antonio Giovinazzi	Prema Racing	31	+20.172	6	10
6	3	(France) Norman Nato	Racing Engineering	31	+23.686	7	8
7	12	(Venezuela) Johnny Cecotto Jr.	Rapax	31	+26.630	13	6
8	5	(United Kingdom) Alex Lynn	DAMS	31	+35.974	9	4
9	6	(Canada) Nicholas Latifi	DAMS	31	+39.007	14	2
10	9	(Italy) Raffaele Marciello	Russian Time	31	+41.589	8	1
11	15	(Italy) Luca Ghiotto	Trident	31	+43.486	12	
12	18	(Spain) Sergio Canamasas	Carlin	31	+43.960	16	
13	4	(United Kingdom) Jordan King	Racing Engineering	31	+46.090	11	
14	23	(Netherlands) Daniël de Jong	MP Motorsport	31	+1:04.814	21	
15	7	(New Zealand) Mitch Evans	Campos Racing	31	+1:26.008	10	
16	14	(Indonesia) Philo Paz Armand	Trident	31	+1:27.892	17	
17	25	(United Kingdom) Emil Bernstorff	Arden International	31	+1:42.538	22	
Ret	19	(Switzerland) Louis Delétraz	Carlin	7	Retired	20	
Ret	8	(Indonesia) Sean Gelael	Campos Racing	6	Retired	19	
Ret	22	(United Kingdom) Oliver Rowland	MP Motorsport	6	Retired	5	
Ret	11	(Sweden) Gustav Malja	Rapax	5	Retired	15	
Ret	24	(Malaysia) Nabil Jeffri	Arden International	3	Retired	18	
Fastest lap: (Japan) Nobuharu Matsushita (ART Grand Prix) – 1:51.175 (on lap 28)

=== Sprint Race ===
Pos.	No.	Driver	Constructor	Laps	Time/Retired	Grid	Points
1	5	(United Kingdom) Alex Lynn	DAMS	22	41:36.580	1	15
2	12	(Venezuela) Johnny Cecotto Jr.	Rapax	22	+4.945	2	12
3	2	(Russia) Sergey Sirotkin	ART Grand Prix	22	+6.607	5	10 (2)
4	1	(Japan) Nobuharu Matsushita	ART Grand Prix	22	+8.078	7	8
5	3	(France) Norman Nato	Racing Engineering	22	+13.375	3	6
6	20	(Italy) Antonio Giovinazzi	Prema Racing	22	+16.716	4	4
7	10	(Russia) Artem Markelov	Russian Time	22	+17.807	6	2
8	7	(New Zealand) Mitch Evans	Campos Racing	22	+22.609	15	1
9	21	(France) Pierre Gasly	Prema Racing	22	+23.226	8	
10	4	(United Kingdom) Jordan King	Racing Engineering	22	+28.848	13	
11	22	(United Kingdom) Oliver Rowland	MP Motorsport	22	+30.312	19	
12	6	(Canada) Nicholas Latifi	DAMS	22	+33.447	9	
13	9	(Italy) Raffaele Marciello	Russian Time	22	+37.784	10	
14	11	(Sweden) Gustav Malja	Rapax	22	+38.996	20	
15	25	(United Kingdom) Emil Bernstorff	Arden International	22	+45.390	17	
16	18	(Spain) Sergio Canamasas	Carlin	22	+45.936	12	
17	19	(Switzerland) Louis Delétraz	Carlin	22	+46.716	18	
18	14	(Indonesia) Philo Paz Armand	Trident	22	+50.219	16	
19	15	(Italy) Luca Ghiotto	Trident	22	+1:08.896	11	
20	24	(Malaysia) Nabil Jeffri	Arden International	22	+1:10.410	21	
21	8	(Indonesia) Sean Gelael	Campos Racing	22	+1:27.122	22	
Ret	23	(Netherlands) Daniël de Jong	MP Motorsport	0	Retired	14	
Fastest lap: (Russia) Sergey Sirotkin (ART Grand Prix) – 1:52.863 (on lap 14)

== Standings after the round ==
Drivers' Championship standings

	Pos.	Driver	Points
1	1	(France) Pierre Gasly	219
1	2	(Italy) Antonio Giovinazzi	211
1	3	(Russia) Sergey Sirotkin	159
1	4	(Italy) Raffaele Marciello	159
1	5	(France) Norman Nato	136

Teams' Championship standings

Pos.	Team	Points
1	(Italy) Prema Racing	430
2	(Spain) Racing Engineering	258
3	(Russia) Russian Time	256
4	(France) ART Grand Prix	251
5	(France) DAMS	147

- Note: Only the top five positions are included for both sets of standings.

== See also ==
- 2016 Abu Dhabi Grand Prix
- 2016 Yas Marina GP3 Series round

Previous round: 2016 Sepang GP2 Series round	GP2 Series; 2016 season	Next round: 2017 Sakhir Formula 2 round
Previous round: 2015 Yas Marina GP2 Series round	Abu Dhabi GP2 round	Next round: 2017 Yas Marina Formula 2 round
