= 2016 Red Bull Ring GP2 Series round =

Motor racing series in Austria

(Austria) 2016 Red Bull Ring GP2 round
Round details
- Round 4 of 11 rounds in the 2016 GP2 Series
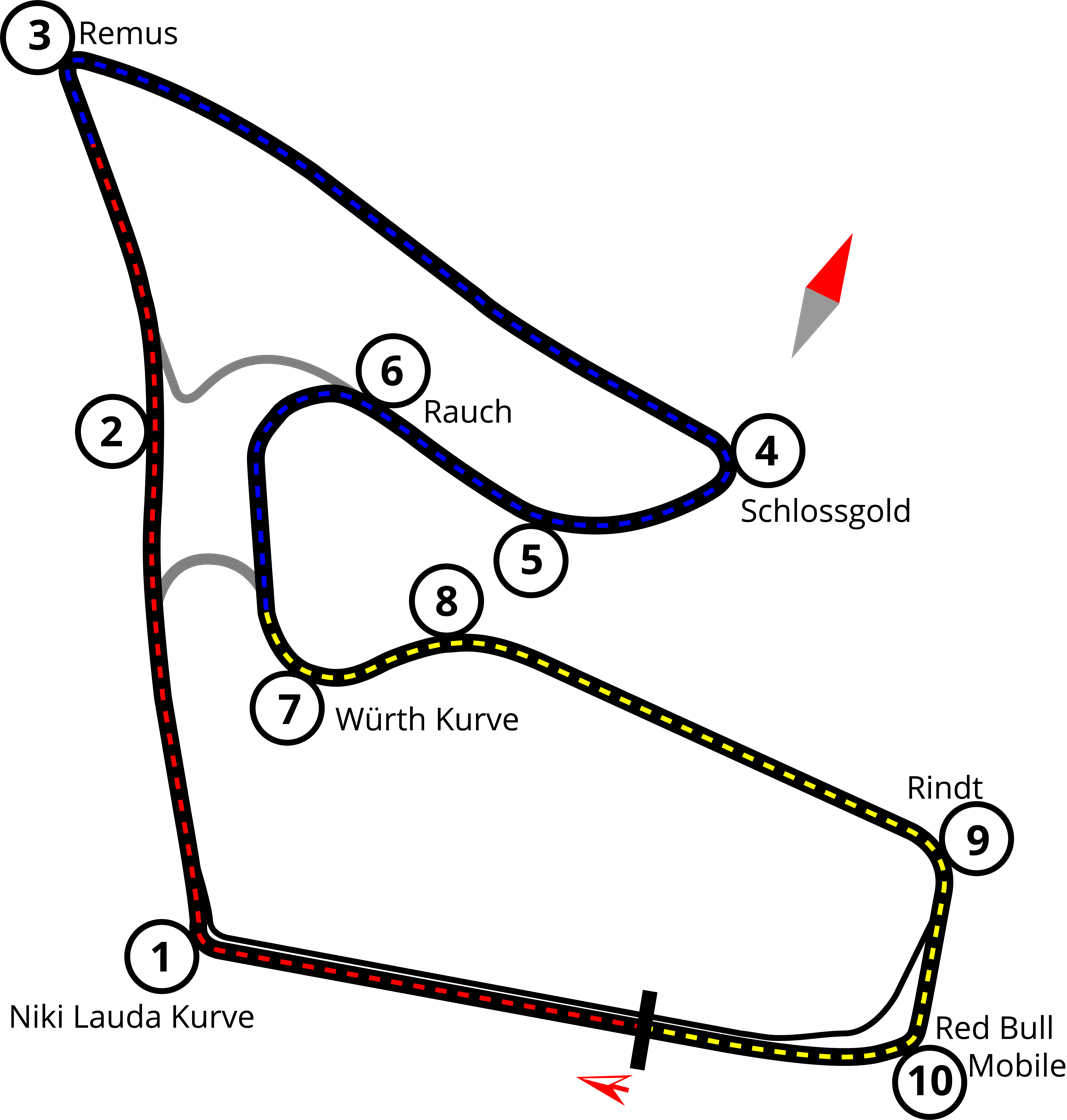
- Layout of the Red Bull Ring
- Location: Red Bull Ring, Spielberg, Styria, Austria
- Course: Permanent racing facility 4.326 km (2.688 mi)

GP2 Series

Feature race
- Date: 2 July 2016
- Laps: 40

Pole position
Driver	(Russia) Sergey Sirotkin	ART Grand Prix
- Time: 1:13.663

Podium
First	(New Zealand) Mitch Evans	Campos Racing
Second	(Indonesia) Sean Gelael	Campos Racing
Third	(Italy) Raffaele Marciello	Russian Time

Fastest lap
Driver	(New Zealand) Mitch Evans	Campos Racing
- Time: 1:15.534 (on lap 38)

Sprint race
- Date: 3 July 2016
- Laps: 28

Podium
First	(United Kingdom) Jordan King	Racing Engineering
Second	(United Kingdom) Oliver Rowland	MP Motorsport
Third	(United Kingdom) Alex Lynn	DAMS

Fastest lap
Driver	(United Kingdom) Jordan King	Racing Engineering
- Time: 1:25.150 (on lap 27)

The 2016 Red Bull Ring GP2 Series round was a GP2 Series motor race held on 2 and 3 July 2016 at the Red Bull Ring in Austria. It was the fourth round of the 2016 GP2 Series. The race weekend supported the 2016 Austrian Grand Prix.

== Background ==
Following the Baku round, Nobuharu Matsushita was suspended from competing in the Austrian GP2 round due to erratic driving that caused several collisions during the restarts. On 28 June, ART Grand Prix announced René Binder as Matsushita's replacement.

== Report ==
=== Qualifying ===
Arden International GP2 driver, Jimmy Eriksson will carry through a three-place grid penalty from the previous round after GP2 stewards deemed him to be at fault in the collision between himself and Jordan King.

Sergey Sirotkin achieved the fastest time of 1:13.663, thereby achieving his second pole position of the year. Antonio Giovinazzi narrowly missed out by six-thousandths of a second and Pierre Gasly occupied third. The session however, ended under yellow flags after Jimmy Eriksson's car stopped at turn seven.

Pos.	No.	Driver	Team	Time	Grid
1	2	(Russia) Sergey Sirotkin	ART Grand Prix	1:13.663	1
2	20	(Italy) Antonio Giovinazzi	Prema Racing	1:13.669	2
3	21	(France) Pierre Gasly	Prema Racing	1:13.803	3
4	15	(Italy) Luca Ghiotto	Trident	1:14.091	4
5	10	(Russia) Artem Markelov	Russian Time	1:14.099	5
6	9	(Italy) Raffaele Marciello	Russian Time	1:14.184	6
7	22	(United Kingdom) Oliver Rowland	MP Motorsport	1:14.316	7
8	5	(United Kingdom) Alex Lynn	DAMS	1:14.387	8
9	3	(France) Norman Nato	Racing Engineering	1:14.456	9
10	7	(New Zealand) Mitch Evans	Pertamina Campos Racing	1:14.574	10
11	24	(Malaysia) Nabil Jeffri	Arden International	1:14.626	14 ^{1}
12	19	(Germany) Marvin Kirchhöfer	Carlin	1:14.647	11
13	12	(France) Arthur Pic	Rapax	1:14.688	12
14	4	(United Kingdom) Jordan King	Racing Engineering	1:14.815	13
15	18	(Spain) Sergio Canamasas	Carlin	1:14.832	17 ^{2}
16	1	(Austria) René Binder	ART Grand Prix	1:14.886	15
17	6	(Canada) Nicholas Latifi	DAMS	1:14.958	20 ^{3}
18	11	(Sweden) Gustav Malja	Rapax	1:15.020	16
19	8	(Indonesia) Sean Gelael	Pertamina Campos Racing	1:15.112	18
20	23	(Netherlands) Daniël de Jong	MP Motorsport	1:15.307	19
21	25	(Sweden) Jimmy Eriksson	Arden International	1:15.531	PL ^{4}
22	14	(Indonesia) Philo Paz Armand	Trident	1:15.675	21

Notes
1. – Jeffri received a three-place grid penalty after having failed to slow down under yellow flag conditions.
2. – Canamasas received a three-place grid penalty after having been deemed to impede a fellow driver.
3. – Latifi received a three-place grid penalty after having been deemed to impede a fellow driver.
4. – Eriksson received a three-place grid penalty adhered from the previous round in Baku. Arden subsequently elected to start him from the pitlane.

=== Feature Race ===
The Feature Race for GP2 was delayed by 15 minutes due to incidents that occurred in the preceding Formula One qualifying session. The race saw changing conditions that effected the outcome of the race. While the bottom of the circuit would be dry, heavy rainfall would be at the top. Gasly spun from the lead which triggered a safety car and a flurry of pitstops. On lap 28, Marvin Kirchhöfer also spun, which triggered another safety car. Upon exiting the pitlane shortly thereafter, Artem Markelov hit the wall on pit exit, prompting a red flag due to damage to the track. After a lengthy delay, the race was restarted behind the safety car with the Campos pair of Mitch Evans and Sean Gelael leading and Philo Paz Armand, who incurred a penalty after overtaking the safety car. Raffaele Marciello began to charge through the field on fresh super soft tyres, but as the pace in the compound started to fade away, Evans took control and won his first race of the season.

Pos.	No.	Driver	Team	Laps	Time/Retired	Grid	Points
1	7	(New Zealand) Mitch Evans	Campos Racing	40	1:18:32.399	10	25 (2)
2	8	(Indonesia) Sean Gelael	Campos Racing	40	+4.600	18	18
3	9	(Italy) Raffaele Marciello	Russian Time	40	+10.789	6	15
4	15	(Italy) Luca Ghiotto	Trident	40	+12.363	4	12
5	25	(Sweden) Jimmy Eriksson	Arden International	40	+12.691	PL	10
6	22	(United Kingdom) Oliver Rowland	MP Motorsport	40	+15.557	7	8
7	3	(France) Norman Nato	Racing Engineering	40	+16.559	9	6
8	4	(United Kingdom) Jordan King	Racing Engineering	40	+22.762	13	4
9	12	(France) Arthur Pic	Rapax	40	+24.738	12	2
10	6	(Canada) Nicholas Latifi	DAMS	40	+25.629	20	1
11	5	(United Kingdom) Alex Lynn	DAMS	40	+27.000	8	
12 ^{1}	2	(Russia) Sergey Sirotkin	ART Grand Prix	40	+29.708	1	(4)
13 ^{2}	11	(Sweden) Gustav Malja	Rapax	40	+30.258	16	
14	23	(Netherlands) Daniël de Jong	MP Motorsport	39	+1 Lap	19	
15	14	(Indonesia) Philo Paz Armand	Trident	39	+1 Lap	21	
16	1	(Austria) René Binder	ART Grand Prix	38	+2 Laps	15	
Ret	20	(Italy) Antonio Giovinazzi	Prema Racing	29	Ignition	2	
Ret	10	(Russia) Artem Markelov	Russian Time	28	Accident	5	
Ret	19	(Germany) Marvin Kirchhöfer	Carlin	26	Spun off	11	
Ret	21	(France) Pierre Gasly	Prema Racing	17	Spun off	3	
Ret	24	(Malaysia) Nabil Jeffri	Arden International	1	Collision damage	14	
Ret	18	(Spain) Sergio Canamasas	Carlin	0	Collision	17	
Fastest lap: (New Zealand) Mitch Evans (Campos Racing) – 1:15.534 (on lap 38)

Notes
1. – Sirotkin was given a ten-second time penalty for failing to re-establish his original starting position before the safety car line and of failing to re-enter the pitlane.
2. – Malja was given a ten-second time penalty for passing several cars as well as the safety car between turns seven and eight during the safety car period without permission from the Race Director.

=== Sprint Race ===
The Sprint Race was held under atrocious conditions, with rain affecting the entire race. This would catch out drivers throughout the race and would lead to two safety cars. The first of which came as a result of Sean Gelael retiring after being hit by Arthur Pic on lap three. The second safety car came after Nicholas Latifi spun on the exit of turn one on lap ten. By this stage, the circuit was beginning to dry and some drivers elected to pit for dry tyres in an attempt to take advantage of the changing conditions. However, the track had not dried out sufficiently by this stage and so saw most of the competitors struggling for grip for the first few laps into the stint. As well as this, the restart was prompt and the group that had pitted for dry tyres were left far behind the leading pack by the time of the restart. In the end, Racing Engineering's Jordan King completed a dominant performance and earned his first GP2 win and Racing Engineering's second of the season.

Pos.	No.	Driver	Team	Laps	Time/Retired	Grid	Points
1	4	(United Kingdom) Jordan King	Racing Engineering	28	44:34.966	1	15 (2)
2	22	(United Kingdom) Oliver Rowland	MP Motorsport	28	+6.019	3	12
3	5	(United Kingdom) Alex Lynn	DAMS	28	+7.702	11	10
4	9	(Italy) Raffaele Marciello	Russian Time	28	+10.234	6	8
5	20	(Italy) Antonio Giovinazzi	Prema Racing	28	+10.417	17	6
6	2	(Russia) Sergey Sirotkin	ART Grand Prix	28	+11.821	12	4
7	21	(France) Pierre Gasly	Prema Racing	28	+12.594	20	2
8	7	(New Zealand) Mitch Evans	Campos Racing	28	+12.881	8	1
9	15	(Italy) Luca Ghiotto	Trident	28	+15.878	5	
10	18	(Spain) Sergio Canamasas	Carlin	28	+35.019	22	
11	10	(Russia) Artem Markelov	Russian Time	28	+57.740	18	
12	3	(France) Norman Nato	Racing Engineering	28	+1:00.076	2	
13	25	(Sweden) Jimmy Eriksson	Arden International	28	+1:00.107	4	
14	14	(Indonesia) Philo Paz Armand	Trident	28	+1:16.880	15	
15	1	(Austria) René Binder	ART Grand Prix	28	+1:17.325	16	
16	11	(Sweden) Gustav Malja	Rapax	27	+1 Lap	13	
17	24	(Malaysia) Nabil Jeffri	Arden International	27	+1 Lap	21	
18	12	(France) Arthur Pic	Rapax	27	+1 Lap	9	
19	19	(Germany) Marvin Kirchhöfer	Carlin	27	+1 Lap	19	
20	23	(Netherlands) Daniel de Jong	MP Motorsport	27	+1 Lap	14	
Ret	6	(Canada) Nicholas Latifi	DAMS	20	Spun off	10	
Ret	8	(Indonesia) Sean Gelael	Campos Racing	3	Collision damage	7	
Fastest lap: (United Kingdom) Jordan King (Racing Engineering) – 1:25.150 (on lap 27)

== Standings after the round ==
Drivers' Championship standings

	Pos	Driver	Points
4	1	(Italy) Raffaele Marciello	66
8	2	(New Zealand) Mitch Evans	56
1	3	(France) Norman Nato	55
3	4	(Russia) Artem Markelov	54
2	5	(United Kingdom) Oliver Rowland	54

Teams' Championship standings

	Pos	Team	Points
	1	(Russia) Russian Time	120
1	2	(Spain) Racing Engineering	100
1	3	(Italy) Prema Racing	99
3	4	(Indonesia) Campos Racing	80
	5	(France) DAMS	72

- Note: Only the top five positions are included for both sets of standings.

== See also ==
- 2016 Austrian Grand Prix
- 2016 Red Bull Ring GP3 Series round

Previous round: 2016 Baku GP2 Series round	GP2 Series; 2016 season	Next round: 2016 Silverstone GP2 Series round
Previous round: 2015 Red Bull Ring GP2 Series round	Red Bull Ring GP2 round	Next round: 2017 Spielberg Formula 2 round
