= 2016 German Grand Prix =

12th round of the 2016 Formula One season

Race 12 of 21 in the 2016 Formula One World Championship
← Previous race	Next race →
- The layout of the Hockenheimring

Race details
- Date: 31 July 2016
- Official name: Formula 1 Grosser Preis von Deutschland 2016
- Location: Hockenheimring, Hockenheim, Germany
- Course: Permanent racing facility
- Course length: 4.574 km (2.842 miles)
- Distance: 67 laps, 306.458 km (190.424 miles)
- Weather: Partially cloudy and dry
- Attendance: 60,000 (Race Day)

Pole position
Driver	(Germany) Nico Rosberg	Mercedes
- Time: 1:14.363

Fastest lap
Driver	(Australia) Daniel Ricciardo	Red Bull Racing-TAG Heuer
- Time: 1:18.442 on lap 48

Podium
First	(United Kingdom) Lewis Hamilton	Mercedes
Second	(Australia) Daniel Ricciardo	Red Bull Racing-TAG Heuer
Third	(Netherlands) Max Verstappen	Red Bull Racing-TAG Heuer

The 2016 German Grand Prix (formally known as the Formula 1 Grosser Preis von Deutschland 2016) was a Formula One motor race that took place on 31 July 2016. After a one-year absence, the race returned to the Hockenheimring near Hockenheim in the German state of Baden-Württemberg, which last held the race in 2014. It was the twelfth round of the 2016 FIA Formula One World Championship, and marked the seventy-sixth running of the German Grand Prix, and the sixty-second time the race has been run as a round of the Formula One World Championship.

Lewis Hamilton entered the round with a six-point lead in the World Drivers' Championship over teammate and defending race winner Nico Rosberg. Hamilton won the race and extended his lead over Rosberg to nineteen points. Their team, Mercedes, further extended its lead in the World Constructors' Championship.

== Report ==
In the week before the race, MRT driver Rio Haryanto was the subject of increased media scrutiny amidst reports that his primary sponsor—Indonesian petrochemical company Pertamina—had not met its financial obligations to the team, thus placing his future with MRT and in the sport in jeopardy. Haryanto was ultimately able to secure the seat for the race, but his long-term future with the team remained in doubt. This would eventually turn out to be his final F1 entry.

Following the handing out of several controversial penalties and extensive debate over the application of amendments to the sporting regulations, the FIA repealed all of the rules restricting pit-to-car communications.

This was the first Grand Prix that double yellow flags would be the same as a red flag in qualifying after the controversial qualifying in the Hungarian Grand Prix.

Tyre supplier Pirelli provided teams with the medium, soft and supersoft compounds.

In the race itself Lewis Hamilton won claiming his 4th victory in a row to move into a 19-point lead in the Championship, Daniel Ricciardo came home 2nd ahead of his teammate Max Verstappen, Nico Rosberg slipped back to 4th after being penalised for forcing Verstappen off the track.

== Classification ==
=== Qualifying ===
Pos.	Car no.	Driver	Constructor	Qualifying times			Final grid
Pos.	Car no.	Driver	Constructor	Q1	Q2	Q3	Final grid
1	6	(Germany) Nico Rosberg	Mercedes	1:15.485	1:14.839	1:14.363	1
2	44	(United Kingdom) Lewis Hamilton	Mercedes	1:15.243	1:14.748	1:14.470	2
3	3	(Australia) Daniel Ricciardo	Red Bull Racing-TAG Heuer	1:15.591	1:15.545	1:14.726	3
4	33	(Netherlands) Max Verstappen	Red Bull Racing-TAG Heuer	1:15.875	1:15.124	1:14.834	4
5	7	(Finland) Kimi Räikkönen	Ferrari	1:15.752	1:15.242	1:15.142	5
6	5	(Germany) Sebastian Vettel	Ferrari	1:15.927	1:15.630	1:15.315	6
7	27	(Germany) Nico Hülkenberg	Force India-Mercedes	1:16.301	1:15.623	1:15.510	8^{1}
8	77	(Finland) Valtteri Bottas	Williams-Mercedes	1:15.952	1:15.490	1:15.530	7
9	11	(Mexico) Sergio Pérez	Force India-Mercedes	1:16.169	1:15.500	1:15.537	9
10	19	(Brazil) Felipe Massa	Williams-Mercedes	1:16.503	1:15.699	1:15.615	10
11	21	(Mexico) Esteban Gutiérrez	Haas-Ferrari	1:15.987	1:15.883		11
12	22	(United Kingdom) Jenson Button	McLaren-Honda	1:16.172	1:15.909		12
13	55	(Spain) Carlos Sainz Jr.	Toro Rosso-Ferrari	1:16.317	1:15.989		15^{2}
14	14	(Spain) Fernando Alonso	McLaren-Honda	1:16.338	1:16.041		13
15	8	(France) Romain Grosjean	Haas-Ferrari	1:16.328	1:16.086		20^{3}
16	30	(United Kingdom) Jolyon Palmer	Renault	1:16.636	1:16.665		14
17	20	(Denmark) Kevin Magnussen	Renault	1:16.716			16
18	94	(Germany) Pascal Wehrlein	MRT-Mercedes	1:16.717			17
19	26	(Russia) Daniil Kvyat	Toro Rosso-Ferrari	1:16.876			18
20	88	(Indonesia) Rio Haryanto	MRT-Mercedes	1:16.977			19
21	12	(Brazil) Felipe Nasr	Sauber-Ferrari	1:17.123			21
22	9	(Sweden) Marcus Ericsson	Sauber-Ferrari	1:17.238			22
107% time: 1:20.114

Notes:

- ^1 – Nico Hülkenberg received a one-place grid penalty for incorrectly using his tyre allocation during the first part of qualifying.
- ^2 – Carlos Sainz Jr. received a three-place grid penalty for impeding Felipe Massa during qualifying.
- ^3 – Romain Grosjean received a five-place grid penalty for an unscheduled gearbox change.

=== Race ===
Pos.	No.	Driver	Constructor	Laps	Time/Retired	Grid	Points
1	44	(United Kingdom) Lewis Hamilton	Mercedes	67	1:30:44.200	2	25
2	3	(Australia) Daniel Ricciardo	Red Bull Racing-TAG Heuer	67	+6.996	3	18
3	33	(Netherlands) Max Verstappen	Red Bull Racing-TAG Heuer	67	+13.413	4	15
4	6	(Germany) Nico Rosberg	Mercedes	67	+15.845	1	12
5	5	(Germany) Sebastian Vettel	Ferrari	67	+32.570	6	10
6	7	(Finland) Kimi Räikkönen	Ferrari	67	+37.023	5	8
7	27	(Germany) Nico Hülkenberg	Force India-Mercedes	67	+1:10.049	8	6
8	22	(United Kingdom) Jenson Button	McLaren-Honda	66	+1 Lap	12	4
9	77	(Finland) Valtteri Bottas	Williams-Mercedes	66	+1 Lap	7	2
10	11	(Mexico) Sergio Pérez	Force India-Mercedes	66	+1 Lap	9	1
11	21	(Mexico) Esteban Gutiérrez	Haas-Ferrari	66	+1 Lap	11	
12	14	(Spain) Fernando Alonso	McLaren-Honda	66	+1 Lap	13	
13	8	(France) Romain Grosjean	Haas-Ferrari	66	+1 Lap	20	
14	55	(Spain) Carlos Sainz Jr.	Toro Rosso-Ferrari	66	+1 Lap	15	
15	26	(Russia) Daniil Kvyat	Toro Rosso-Ferrari	66	+1 Lap	18	
16	20	(Denmark) Kevin Magnussen	Renault	66	+1 Lap	16	
17	94	(Germany) Pascal Wehrlein	MRT-Mercedes	65	+2 Laps	17	
18	9	(Sweden) Marcus Ericsson	Sauber-Ferrari	65	+2 Laps	22	
19	30	(United Kingdom) Jolyon Palmer	Renault	65	+2 Laps	14	
20	88	(Indonesia) Rio Haryanto	MRT-Mercedes	65	+2 Laps	19	
Ret	12	(Brazil) Felipe Nasr	Sauber-Ferrari	57	Power unit	21	
Ret	19	(Brazil) Felipe Massa	Williams-Mercedes	36	Suspension	10	

== Championship standings after the race ==
Drivers' Championship standings

Pos.	Driver	Points
1	(United Kingdom) Lewis Hamilton	217
2	(Germany) Nico Rosberg	198
3	(Australia) Daniel Ricciardo	133
4	(Finland) Kimi Räikkönen	122
5	(Germany) Sebastian Vettel	120

Constructors' Championship standings

	Pos.	Constructor	Points
	1	(Germany) Mercedes	415
1	2	(Austria) Red Bull Racing-TAG Heuer	256
1	3	(Italy) Ferrari	242
	4	(United Kingdom) Williams-Mercedes	96
	5	Force India-Mercedes	81

- Note: Only the top five positions are included for both sets of standings.

== See also ==
- 2016 Hockenheimring GP2 Series round
- 2016 Hockenheimring GP3 Series round

Previous race: 2016 Hungarian Grand Prix	FIA Formula One World Championship; 2016 season	Next race: 2016 Belgian Grand Prix
Previous race: 2014 German Grand Prix	German Grand Prix	Next race: 2018 German Grand Prix
