= National Institute of Aviation Technologies (Moscow) =

Russian research institute

- Type: Open Joint Stock Company
- Founded: 1920
- Headquarters: Moscow, Russia
- Website: niat.ru

National Institute of Aviation Technologies (NIAT) (Russian: Национальный институт авиационных технологий) is a research institute based in Moscow, Russia.

NIAT is involved in the development of advanced production technologies for the aviation industry. It is also active in cryogenic engineering. It markets finished products in the form of numerically-controlled milling and welding machinery, melting and pouring equipment for magnesium and titanium alloy castings, liquid and gas storage tanks, several varieties of laser cooling systems, as well as alloy parts and manufacturing processes for composite materials prepreg manufacture. NIAT also provides services such as mathematical modelling of physical-mechanical processes and optimization of technological processes.
