= Gustav Malja =

Swedish racing driver (born 1995)

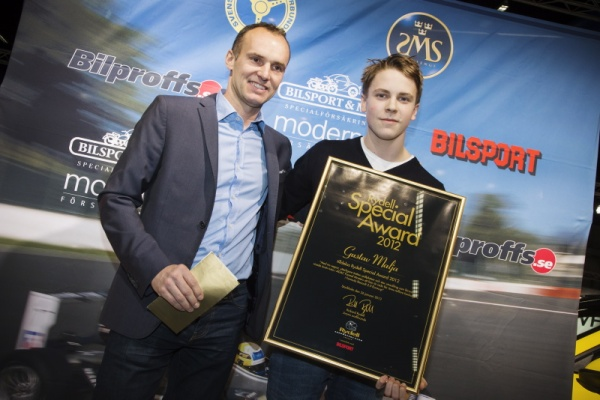
- Malja receiving the Rydell Special Award for the 2012 season.
- Nationality: (Sweden) Swedish
- Born: Gustav Koch Malja; 4 November 1995 (age 31) Malmö, Sweden

FIA Formula 2 Championship career
- Debut season: 2017
- Car number: 4
- Former teams: Racing Engineering
- Starts: 22
- Wins: 0
- Podiums: 1
- Poles: 0
- Fastest laps: 0
- Best finish: 13th in 2017

Previous series
- 2015-16 2015 2015 2013–2014 2013–2014 2012 2011–2012: GP2 Series; World Series Formula V8 3.5; FIA European F3 Championship; Eurocup Formula Renault 2.0; Formula Renault 2.0 NEC; FR2.0 BARC Winter Series; ADAC Formel Masters

Awards
- 2010, 2015 2011, 2012: Ronnie Peterson Memorial Award; Rydell Special Award

Gustav Koch Malja (born 4 November 1995) is a Swedish former racing driver.

== Career ==
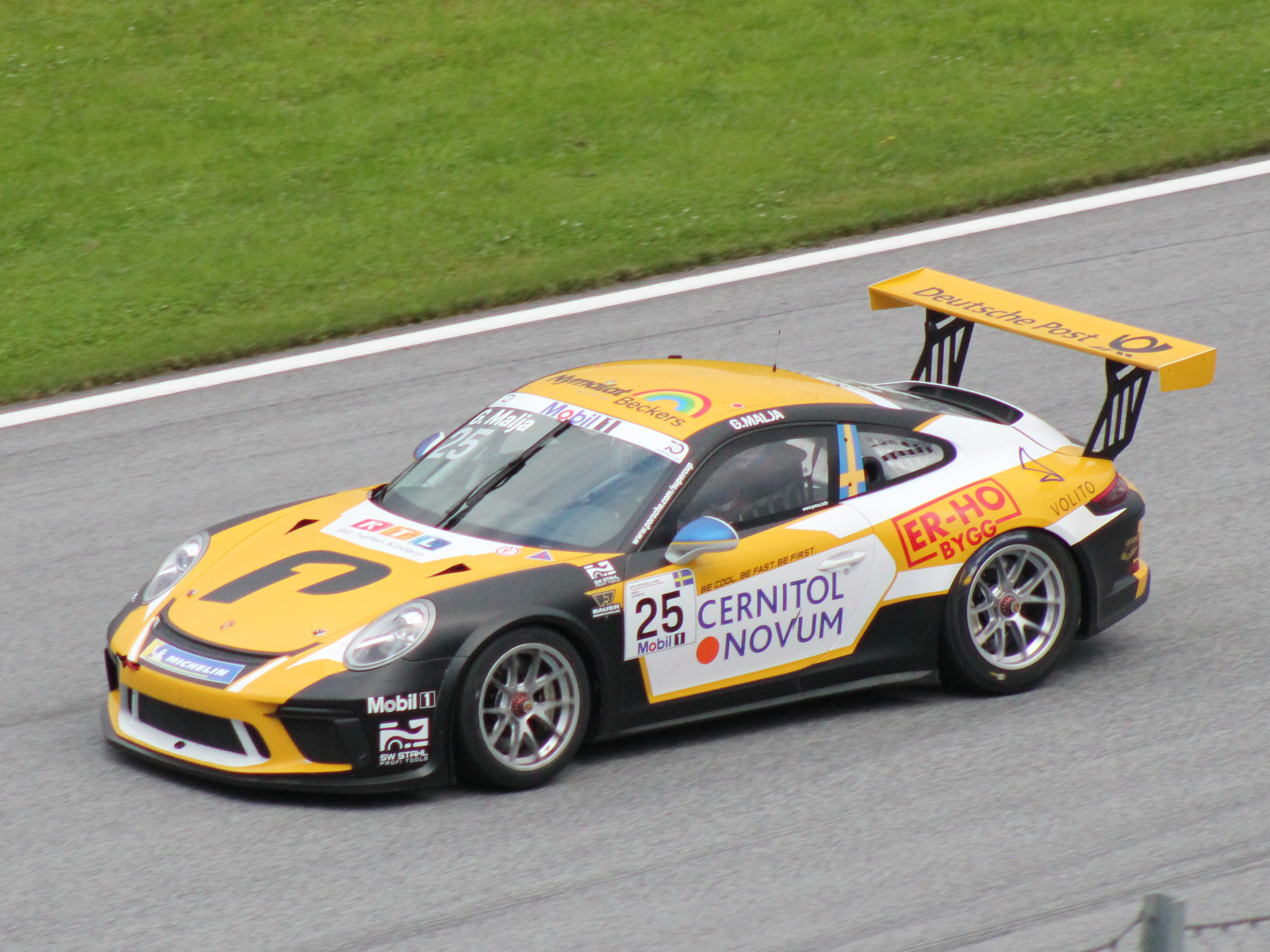
Gustav Malja at the Red Bull Ring in 2018

=== Karting ===
Born in Malmö, Sweden, Malja began his karting career in Formula Micro in 2006, winning the Gunnar Nilsson Memorial trophy the following year. By 2009 he had progressed up to the KF3 category, where he won the Swedish Championship and Gothenburg Grand Prix. In his final year of karting in 2010, Malja finished 22nd in the European KF3 Championship and fifth in the Junior Monaco Kart Cup.

=== ADAC Formel Masters ===
In 2011, Malja graduated to single-seaters, racing in the ADAC Formel Masters championship in Germany, despite being just 15 years of age. Driving for Neuhauser Racing, he took a single podium position at Assen to finish thirteenth in the standings. He continued with the team for a second season in 2012, taking three race wins and a further thirteen podium places to finish runner–up to champion Marvin Kirchhöfer.

=== Formula Renault 2.0 ===
For 2013, Malja stepped up to Formula Renault, racing in the Eurocup Formula Renault 2.0 and Formula Renault 2.0 NEC championships with Josef Kaufmann Racing. In the NEC championship, he contested eight races, taking podium places at the Nürburgring and Most to finish fifteenth in the standings. In the Eurocup he finished twentieth in the championship, taking a single points–position at Paul Ricard.

Malja remained with Josef Kaufmann Racing in both championships for a second season in 2014. He finished fifth in the NEC championship, taking race victories at Hockenheim and the Nürburgring and two further podium positions. In the Eurocup, he scored points on eight occasions to finish twelfth in the championship.

=== Formula Renault 3.5 Series ===
Malja stepped up to the Formula Renault 3.5 Series in 2015 and raced for British team Strakka Racing.

=== Formula Three ===
In May 2015, Malja took part in the Pau round of the FIA European Formula 3 Championship, racing for EuroInternational in the car originally intended for Marvin Kirchhöfer before he left the team prior to the start of the season. He retired from the opening race of the event before finishing 25th in the remaining two races.

=== GP2/Formula 2 ===
Malja contested in the Spa round of the 2015 season with Trident and the final two rounds with Rapax. In 2016, Malja joined the GP2 series campaign full-time for Rapax, finished on the podium twice and finished thirteenth overall.

For the 2017 F2 season, Malja switched to Racing Engineering. He finished third in the Monaco sprint race.

=== Formula 1 ===
Malja participated in the second 2017 Formula 1 in-season test at the Hungaroring during 1–2 August, following the Hungarian GP weekend. Malja drove a Sauber C36-Ferrari for the Sauber F1 Team during the first test day. He completed 108 laps. His best lap was 1.21.503, set during aerodynamic and mechanical development runs.

== Racing record ==
=== Career summary ===
Season	Series	Team	Races	Wins	Poles	F/Laps	Podiums	Points	Position
2011	ADAC Formel Masters	Neuhauser Racing	24	0	0	0	1	69	13th
2012	ADAC Formel Masters	Neuhauser Racing	23	3	1	9	16	307	**2nd**
2012	Formula Renault BARC Winter Series	MGR Motorsport	2	0	0	0	0	0	NC
2013	Eurocup Formula Renault 2.0	Josef Kaufmann Racing	14	0	0	0	0	4	20th
2013	Formula Renault 2.0 NEC	Josef Kaufmann Racing	8	0	0	0	2	98	15th
2014	Formula Renault 2.0 NEC	Josef Kaufmann Racing	14	2	1	2	4	193	5th
2014	Eurocup Formula Renault 2.0	Josef Kaufmann Racing	14	0	0	0	0	49	12th
2015	Formula Renault 3.5 Series	Strakka Racing	17	0	0	0	2	79	9th
2015	FIA Formula 3 European Championship	EuroInternational	3	0	0	0	0	0	42nd
2015	GP2 Series	Trident	2	0	0	0	0	1	25th
2015	GP2 Series	Rapax	3	0	0	0	0	1	25th
2016	GP2 Series	Rapax	22	0	0	0	2	53	13th
2017	FIA Formula 2 Championship	Racing Engineering	22	0	0	0	1	44	13th
2017	Formula One	Sauber F1 Team	Test driver						
2018	Porsche Supercup	Team Project 1	10	0	0	0	0	26	14th
2018	Porsche Carrera Cup Germany	Team Deutsche Post by Project 1	14	0	0	0	1	82	11th
2019	Porsche Carrera Cup Germany	Förch Racing	16	0	0	0	0	50.5	14th

=== Complete Eurocup Formula Renault 2.0 results ===
(key) (Races in bold indicate pole position; races in italics indicate fastest lap)

Year	Entrant	1	2	3	4	5	6	7	8	9	10	11	12	13	14	DC	Points
2013	Josef Kaufmann Racing	ALC; 1; 33	ALC; 2; 19	SPA; 1; 19	SPA; 2 Ret	MSC; 1; 17	MSC; 2; 19	RBR; 1; 12	RBR; 2 Ret	HUN; 1; 26	HUN; 2; 13	LEC; 1; 8	LEC; 2; 23	CAT; 1; 13	CAT; 2; 22	20th	4
2014	Josef Kaufmann Racing	ALC; 1; 6	ALC; 2; 10	SPA; 1; 32	SPA; 2; 21	MSC; 1; 14	MSC; 2; 17	NÜR; 1; 14	NÜR; 2; 12	HUN; 1; 5	HUN; 2; 4	LEC; 1; 9	LEC; 2; 7	JER; 1 Ret	JER; 2; 10	12th	49

=== Complete Formula Renault 2.0 NEC results ===
(key) (Races in bold indicate pole position) (Races in italics indicate fastest lap)

Year	Entrant	1	2	3	4	5	6	7	8	9	10	11	12	13	14	15	16	17	DC	Points
2013	Josef Kaufmann Racing	HOC; 1; 9	HOC; 2; 7	HOC; 3; 7	NÜR; 1; 28	NÜR; 2; 2	SIL; 1	SIL; 2	SPA; 1	SPA; 2	ASS; 1	ASS; 2	MST; 1; 3	MST; 2; 7	MST; 3 Ret	ZAN; 1	ZAN; 2	ZAN; 3	15th	98
2014	Josef Kaufmann Racing	MNZ; 1 Ret	MNZ; 2 Ret	SIL; 1; 4	SIL; 2 DNS	**HOC**; **1**; 1	HOC; 2; 9	HOC; 3; 4	SPA; 1; 6	SPA; 2; 3	ASS; 1; 3	ASS; 2; 5	MST; 1; 21	MST; 2; 6	MST; 3 C	NÜR; 1; 20	NÜR; 2; 1	NÜR; 3 C	5th	193

=== Complete Formula Renault 3.5 Series results ===
(key) (Races in bold indicate pole position) (Races in italics indicate fastest lap)

Year	Team	1	2	3	4	5	6	7	8	9	10	11	12	13	14	15	16	17	Pos.	Points
2015	Strakka Racing	ALC; 1; 10	ALC; 2; 20	MON; 1 Ret	SPA; 1; 8	SPA; 2; 14	HUN; 1; 10	HUN; 2; 3	RBR; 1; 7	RBR; 2; 7	SIL; 1; 6	SIL; 2; 8	NÜR; 1; 8	NÜR; 2; 2	BUG; 1; 11	BUG; 2; 9	JER; 1; 11	JER; 2; 5	9th	79

=== Complete FIA Formula 3 European Championship results ===
(key) (Races in bold indicate pole position) (Races in italics indicate fastest lap)

Year	Entrant	Engine	1	2	3	4	5	6	7	8	9	10	11	12	13	14	15	16	17	18	19	20	21	22	23	24	25	26	27	28	29	30	31	32	33	DC	Points
2015	EuroInternational	Mercedes	SIL; 1	SIL; 2	SIL; 3	HOC; 1	HOC; 2	HOC; 3	PAU; 1 Ret	PAU; 2; 25	PAU; 3; 25	MNZ; 1	MNZ; 2	MNZ; 3	SPA; 1	SPA; 2	SPA; 3	NOR; 1	NOR; 2	NOR; 3	RBR; 1	RBR; 2	RBR; 3	ZAN; 1	ZAN; 2	ZAN; 3	ALG; 1	ALG; 2	ALG; 3	NÜR; 1	NÜR; 2	NÜR; 3	HOC; 1	HOC; 2	HOC; 3	42nd	0

=== Complete GP2 Series/FIA Formula 2 results ===
(key) (Races in bold indicate pole position) (Races in italics indicate fastest lap)

Year	Entrant	1	2	3	4	5	6	7	8	9	10	11	12	13	14	15	16	17	18	19	20	21	22	DC	Points
2015	Trident	BHR; FEA	BHR; SPR	CAT; FEA	CAT; SPR	MON; FEA	MON; SPR	RBR; FEA	RBR; SPR	SIL; FEA	SIL; SPR	HUN; FEA	HUN; SPR	SPA; FEA; 10	SPA; SPR; 18	MNZ; FEA	MNZ; SPR	SOC; FEA	SOC; SPR					25th	1
2015	Rapax																			BHR; FEA; 16	BHR; SPR; 13	YMC; FEA; 16	YMC; SPR; C	25th	1
2016	Rapax	CAT; FEA; 9	CAT; SPR; 10	MON; FEA; 14	MON; SPR; 12	BAK; FEA; 10	BAK; SPR; Ret	RBR; FEA; 13	RBR; SPR; 16	SIL; FEA; 22	SIL; SPR; 19	HUN; FEA; 13	HUN; SPR; 14	HOC; FEA; 6	HOC; SPR; 8	SPA; FEA; 8	SPA; SPR; 2	MNZ; FEA; 3	MNZ; SPR; 7	SEP; FEA; 9	SEP; SPR; 5	YMC; FEA; Ret	YMC; SPR; 14	13th	53
2017	Racing Engineering	BHR; FEA; 18	BHR; SPR; 13	CAT; FEA; 7	CAT; SPR; 6	MON; FEA; 6	MON; SPR; 3	BAK; FEA; 11	BAK; SPR; 13	RBR; FEA; 12	RBR; SPR; 15	SIL; FEA; 14	SIL; SPR; 9	HUN; FEA; 13	HUN; SPR; NC	SPA; FEA; 4	SPA; SPR; 11	MNZ; FEA; 8	MNZ; SPR; 18	JER; FEA; 14	JER; SPR; 18	YMC; FEA; 11	YMC; SPR; 17	13th	44

=== Complete Porsche Supercup results ===
(key) (Races in bold indicate pole position) (Races in italics indicate fastest lap)

Year	Team	1	2	3	4	5	6	7	8	9	10	DC	Points
2018	Team Project 1	CAT; 15	MON; 13	RBR; 13	SIL; 17	HOC; 11	HUN; 15	SPA; 16	MNZ; 26†	MEX; 9	MEX; 18	14th	26

^{†} Driver did not finish the race, but was classified as he completed over 90% of the race distance.
