= Prema Racing =

Motorsport team from Italy

(Italy) Prema Racing
- Founded: 1983; 43 years ago
- Founder(s): Angelo Rosin; Giorgio Piccolo
- Base: Grisignano di Zocco, Veneto, Italy
- Team principal(s): Stephen Mitas
- Current drivers: Full list
- Teams' Championships: Full list
- Drivers' Championships: Full list
- Website: premaracing.com/en

Prema Racing (sometimes stylised as PREMA Racing), previously known as Prema Powerteam, is an Italian motorsport team, owned and operated through the DC Racing Solutions parent company. Founded in 1983, the team is based in Grisignano di Zocco and currently operates out of Italy and the United States. They are the sister team of Iron Lynx and its own sister team, Iron Dames.

Prema participate in various junior championships and have been a talent pool for several Formula 1 junior programs including: Toyota, Renault, Ferrari, Mercedes, Red Bull, and Williams. Their participation in motorsports is not limited to junior formulae though, as the team made their FIA World Endurance Championship and European Le Mans Series debuts in 2022, marking the beginning of their efforts in the endurance racing. They also started competing in the IndyCar Series during 2025.

As of 2025, Prema are fielding 29 drivers and participate in fourteen championships under various names. (Note: Prema operates cars for the Mumbai Falcons and Argenti's entries in the Formula Regional Middle East Championship, F4 Middle East Championship and GB3 Championship.)

== History ==
=== Junior formulae series ===
Prema Racing started operating in 1983 and joined the Italian Formula 3 Championship the following year. National F3 would be the main proving ground for the team in the early years. Among his first famous alumni stand future Touring Car star Fabrizio Giovanardi, multiple Le Mans winner Rinaldo Capello and Formula 1 World Champion Jacques Villeneuve. More Italian Formula 3 Championship titles came in 1990 with Roberto Colciago, in 1998 with Donny Crevels and in 1999 with Peter Sundberg. The team also made a one-season attempt at the International Formula 3000 Championship.

In 1988, the team made its first international foray at the Macau Grand Prix, a competition that would have seen it at the start for the most part of the following decades.

In 2000, Prema started competing in the modern-era Formula Renault races, winning the Formula Renault 2000 Eurocup Team Championship and the Italian Formula Renault 2000 championship with Ryan Briscoe in 2001. Other notable achievements include winning the 2005 Italian Formula Renault 2000 Championship with future F1 star. Over 10 Prema drivers have made it into Formula 1. Kamui Kobayashi.

In 2003, the team entered the Formula 3 Euro Series and won the inaugural edition with Ryan Briscoe. In the following years, the team struggled to achieve competitive results but rebounded by claiming the 2011 and 2012 titles with Roberto Mehri and Daniel Juncadella. The series then transitioned into the FIA Formula 3 European Championship, and Prema started almost complete domination, winning all the team titles from 2011 and 2018 and all the driver championships but one. Some of the Champions also went on to become Formula 1 drivers including Esteban Ocon, Lance Stroll, Andrea Kimi Antonelli, and Mick Schumacher. In 2011, the team claimed its first Macau Grand Prix win with Juncadella.

In the same period, the team started expanding towards the bottom and the top of the junior single-seater ladder. Between 2006 and 2009, the team took part in the World Series Formula V8 3.5 championship with a best placing of fourth in 2008 with Miguel Molina, and also competed in the short-lived Italian and European Formula Abarth championships.

With the FIA establishing a more strictly-regulated ladder toward Formula 1, Prema progressively expanded to encompass all its steps. While staying active in European Formula 3, the team embraced Formula 4, winning the first two editions of the Italian Formula 4 Championship with Lance Stroll and Ralf Aron. It also entered the GP2 Series in 2016, finishing 1–2 at debut with Red Bull Junior driver Pierre Gasly and Antonio Giovinazzi. In 2017, as the series evolved into the FIA Formula 2 Championship, Prema dominated again with Ferrari Driver Academy's Charles Leclerc claiming seven wins and seven poles en route to an early title.

For 2018 FIA Formula 2 Championship campaign the team fielded experienced drivers Sean Gelael and Nyck de Vries. In the 2018 FIA Formula 3 European Championship the team were represented by Ferrari Driver Academy members Marcus Armstrong, Robert Shwartzman and Guanyu Zhou. Their 2016 F3 driver Ralf Aron returned to the F3 team, as well as Mick Schumacher who went on to win the Formula. For their double ADAC and Italian F4 programme they signed Olli Caldwell and Ferrari Academy drivers Enzo Fittipaldi and Gianluca Petecof. Red Bull Junior Jack Doohan is scheduled to race with Prema for selected round in both championships.

In 2019 the team is represented in FIA Formula 2 by Sean Gelael and their FIA F3 European Champion Mick Schumacher. Whilst the team only finished 9th in the team championship in F2, they were the champions in the inaugural F3 Championship with the drivers Robert Shwartzman, Jehan Daruvala and Marcus Armstrong. Shwartzman would also end up winning the driver's title, with Armstrong and Daruvala coming second and third respectively. Prema also competed in Italian F4 in 2019, where they came second in both championships, being beaten comprehensively by Van Amersfoort Racing and the Norwegian driver Dennis Hauger.

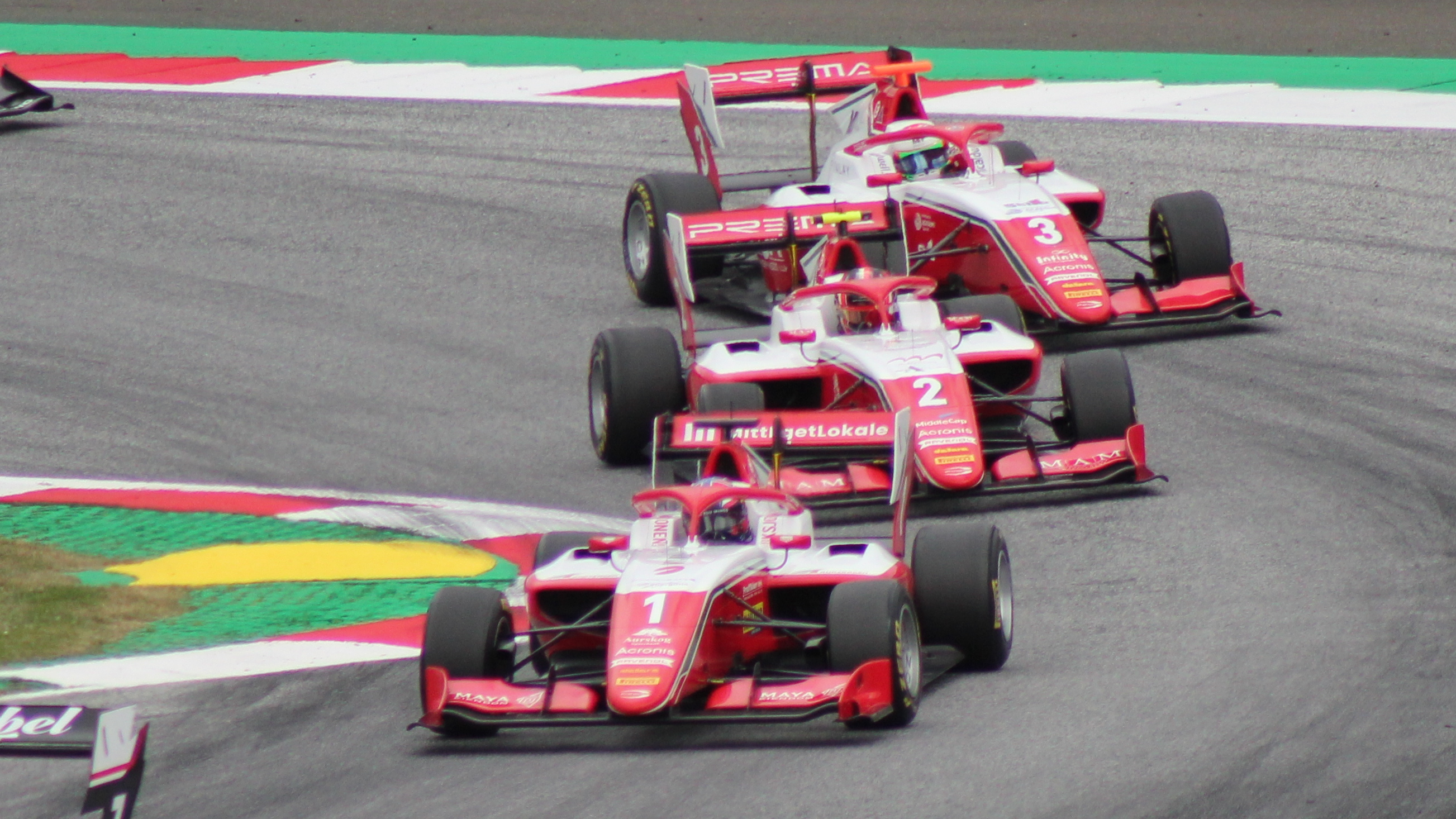
The Prema drivers during the FIA Formula 3 season (2021)

Mick Schumacher was retained and Shwartzman was promoted for the following F2 season. Schumacher would go on to win the drivers title, with Shwartzman finishing in 4th with the most wins. In the 2020 F3 season, the driver line up was Logan Sargeant, Prema's 2019 FREC winner Frederik Vesti, and Oscar Piastri. Piastri would win the drivers' championship, with Sargeant and Vesti 3rd and 4th respectively. For the 2020 FREC season, Prema's line up consisted of four full time drivers; past Prema F4 drivers Oliver Rasmussen and Gianluca Petecof, as well as Arthur Leclerc and Jamie Chadwick. The season was completely dominated by the team, with Petecof, Leclerc and Rasmussen finishing in the first three positions of the drivers' championship, and as in 2020 F3 season winning the teams' championship by a more than comfortable margin.

On 14 January 2026, it was reported that the Rosin family had left the team. On 6 February 2026, it was reported that Australian engineer Stephen Mitas was Prema's new team principal and CEO.

=== IndyCar Series ===
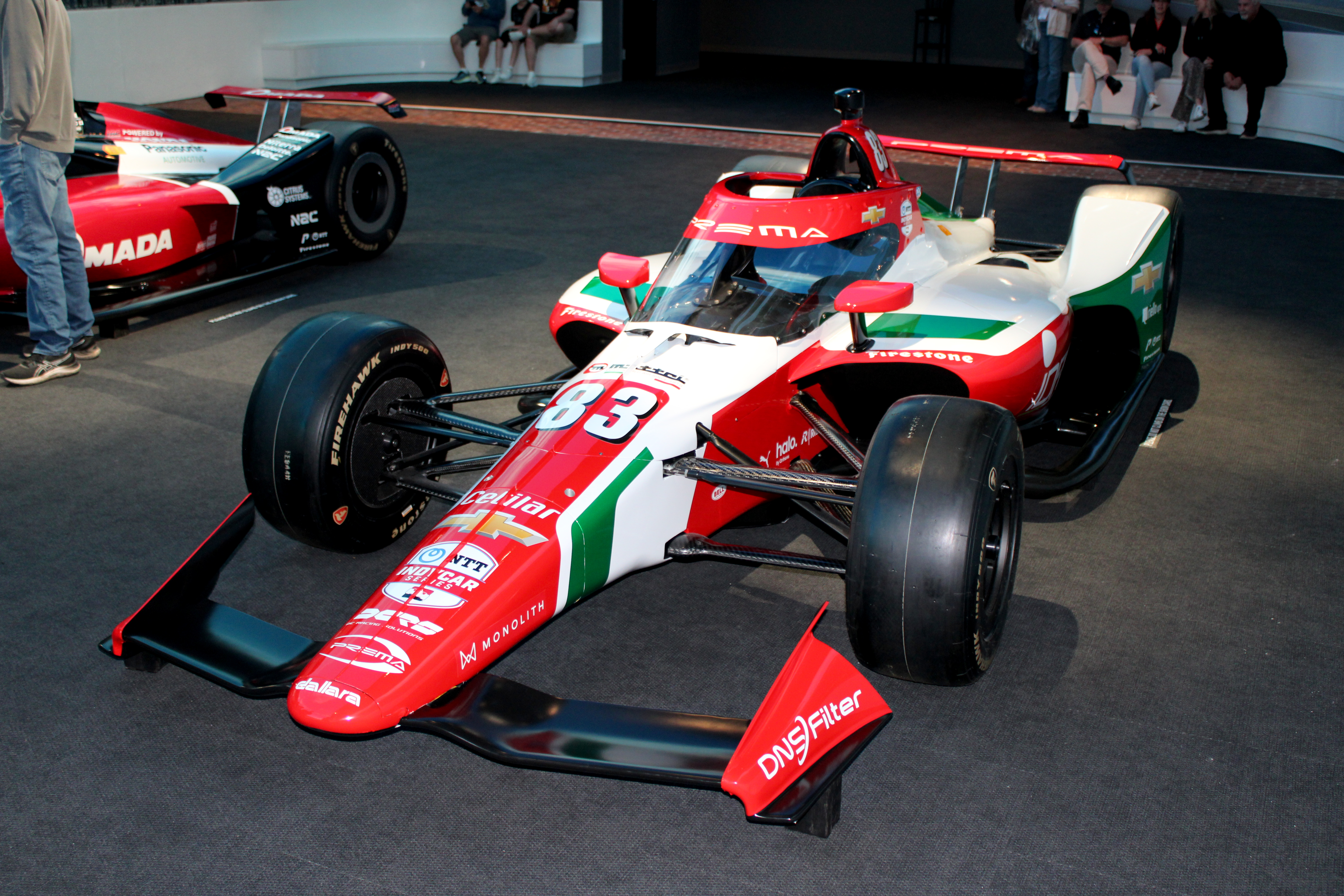
Robert Shwartzman's 2025 Prema Racing Dallara IR-18 on display at the Indianapolis Motor Speedway Museum

In early 2024, Prema expressed interest about joining IndyCar as early as 2025. In April of that year, the team confirmed their entry into the 2025 season, and are going to be supplied by Chevrolet engines. The team is set to have a two driver lineup, composed of Callum Ilott and former Prema F2 driver Robert Shwartzman.

The team secured its first pole position with Shwartzman for the 2025 Indianapolis 500. Shwartzman became the first rookie driver to win the pole in qualifying since the 1983 running of the event. Despite the rookie pole at Indianapolis in 2025, Prema Racing's continued involvement has been placed in doubt owing to media reports centering around the team's financial stability starting in November 2025 and sudden exit of the Rosin family in January 2026.

The official IndyCar Series entry list also does not list Prema Racing as an official entrant as of 1 February 2026.

== Current drivers ==
Drivers competing with Prema in 2026
Current series	No.	Driver
FIA Formula 2	11	(Colombia) Sebastián Montoya
FIA Formula 2	12	(Spain) Mari Boya
FIA Formula 3	20	(United States) Alex Powell
FIA Formula 3	21	(Australia) James Wharton
FIA Formula 3	22	(Mexico) José Garfias
FR European	51	(United Kingdom) Kean Nakamura-Berta
FR European	88	(Colombia) Salim Hanna
FR European	33	(Latvia) Tomass Štolcermanis
Italian F4	10	(Turkey) Alp Aksoy
Italian F4	27	(Ukraine) Oleksandr Bondarev
Italian F4	1	(Spain) Christian Costoya
Italian F4	19	(Italy) Niccolò Maccagnani
Italian F4	98	(Romania) David Cosma Cristofor
Italian F4	69	(China) Kingsley Zheng
Italian F4	4	(United Kingdom) Roman Kamyab
UAE4 Series	27	(Ukraine) Oleksandr Bondarev
UAE4 Series	1	(Spain) Christian Costoya
UAE4 Series	9	(United States) Payton Westcott
UAE4 Series	98	(Romania) David Cosma Cristofor
E4	10	(Turkey) Alp Aksoy
E4	27	(Ukraine) Oleksandr Bondarev
E4	1	(Spain) Christian Costoya
E4	19	(Italy) Niccolò Maccagnani
E4	98	(Switzerland) Georgiy Zasov
E4	69	(China) Kingsley Zheng
E4	4	(United Kingdom) Roman Kamyab
E4	73	(Bulgaria) Lyuboslav Ruykov
F1 Academy	8	(Germany) Mathilda Paatz
F1 Academy	9	(United States) Payton Westcott
F1 Academy	19	(Spain) Natalia Granada

== List of championships ==
- Defunct series in italics; reigning champions in **bold**.

=== List of Teams' Championships ===
Series	Year
Eurocup Formula Renault 2.0	2001
Italian Formula Renault	2001
Italian Formula Renault	2003
Formula Abarth	2010
Formula 3 Euro Series	2011
Formula 3 Euro Series	2012
Formula Renault 2.0 Alps	2013
FIA F3 European	2013
FIA F3 European	2014
FIA F3 European	2015
FIA F3 European	2016
FIA F3 European	2017
FIA F3 European	2018
**Italian F4**	2014
**Italian F4**	2015
**Italian F4**	2016
**Italian F4**	2018
**Italian F4**	2020
**Italian F4**	2022
**Italian F4**	2023
**Italian F4**	2024
**Italian F4**	2025
ADAC F4	2016
ADAC F4	2017
ADAC F4	2022
GP2	2016
FR European	2019
FR European	2020
FR European	2022
FR European	2023
FR European	2024
FIA Formula 3	2019
FIA Formula 3	2020
FIA Formula 3	2022
FIA Formula 3	2023
FIA Formula 3	2024
FIA Formula 2	2020
FIA Formula 2	2021
F3 Asian	2021
**F1 Academy**	2023
**F1 Academy**	2024
**F1 Academy**	2025
**E4** (**Euro 4**)	2023
**E4** (**Euro 4**)	2024
**E4** (**Euro 4**)	2025
**FR Middle East**	2023
**FR Middle East**	2025
**FR Middle East**	2026

=== List of Drivers' Championships ===
Series	Year	Driver
Italian Formula Three	1990	(Italy) Roberto Colciago
Italian Formula Three	1990	(Italy) Giuseppe Bugatti
Italian Formula Three	1998	(Netherlands) Donny Crevels
Italian Formula Three	1999	(Sweden) Peter Sundberg
Italian Formula Renault	2001	(Australia) Ryan Briscoe
Italian Formula Renault	2003	(France) Franck Perera
Italian Formula Renault	2005	(Japan) Kamui Kobayashi
Formula 3 Euro Series	2003	(Australia) Ryan Briscoe
Formula 3 Euro Series	2011	(Spain) Roberto Merhi
Formula 3 Euro Series	2012	(Spain) Daniel Juncadella
Eurocup Formula Renault 2.0	2005	(Japan) Kamui Kobayashi
F3 International Trophy	2011	(Spain) Roberto Merhi
FIA F3 European	2012	(Spain) Daniel Juncadella
FIA F3 European	2013	(Italy) Raffaele Marciello
FIA F3 European	2014	(France) Esteban Ocon
FIA F3 European	2015	(Sweden) Felix Rosenqvist
FIA F3 European	2016	(Canada) Lance Stroll
FIA F3 European	2018	(Germany) Mick Schumacher
Formula Renault 2.0 Alps	2013	(Italy) Antonio Fuoco
**Italian F4**	2014	(Canada) Lance Stroll
**Italian F4**	2015	(Estonia) Ralf Aron
**Italian F4**	2017	(New Zealand) Marcus Armstrong
**Italian F4**	2018	(Brazil) Enzo Fittipaldi
**Italian F4**	2020	(Italy) Gabriele Minì
**Italian F4**	2022	(Italy) Andrea Kimi Antonelli
**Italian F4**	2024	(United Kingdom) Freddie Slater
**Italian F4**	2025	(Japan) Kean Nakamura-Berta
GP2	2016	(France) Pierre Gasly
ADAC Formula 4	2017	(Estonia) Jüri Vips
ADAC Formula 4	2022	(Italy) Andrea Kimi Antonelli
FIA Formula 2	2017	(Monaco) Charles Leclerc
FIA Formula 2	2020	(Germany) Mick Schumacher
FIA Formula 2	2021	(Australia) Oscar Piastri
**FR European**	2019	(Denmark) Frederik Vesti
**FR European**	2020	(Italy) Gianluca Petecof
**FR European**	2022	(Sweden) Dino Beganovic
**FR European**	2023	(Italy) Andrea Kimi Antonelli
**FR European**	2024	(Brazil) Rafael Câmara
**FR European**	2025	(United Kingdom) Freddie Slater
FIA Formula 3	2019	(Russia) Robert Shwartzman
FIA Formula 3	2020	(Australia) Oscar Piastri
FIA Formula 3	2021	(Norway) Dennis Hauger
F3 Asian	2021	(China) Zhou Guanyu
**F1 Academy**	2023	(Spain) Marta García
**F1 Academy**	2025	(France) Doriane Pin
**E4** (**Euro 4**)	2023	(United States) Ugo Ugochukwu
**E4** (**Euro 4**)	2025	(Japan) Kean Nakamura-Berta
**FR Middle East**	2023	(Italy) Andrea Kimi Antonelli
**FR Middle East**	2026	(Japan) Kean Nakamura-Berta

== Current series results ==
=== FIA Formula 2 Championship ===
Year	Chassis	Engine	Tyres	Drivers	Races	Wins	Poles	F. Laps	Podiums	D.C.	Pts	T.C.	Pts
2017	Dallara; GP2/11	Mecachrome; V8108 V8	P	(Monaco) Charles Leclerc	22	7	8	4	10	1st	282	2nd	380
2017	Dallara; GP2/11	Mecachrome; V8108 V8	P	(Italy) Antonio Fuoco	22	1	0	1	5	8th	98	2nd	380
2018	Dallara; F2 2018	Mecachrome; V634T V6 t	P	(Indonesia) Sean Gelael	23	0	0	0	1	15th	29	5th	231
2018	Dallara; F2 2018	Mecachrome; V634T V6 t	P	(Netherlands) Nyck de Vries	24	3	2	4	6	4th	202	5th	231
2019	Dallara; F2 2018	Mecachrome; V634T V6 t	P	(Germany) Mick Schumacher	22	1	0	2	1	12th	53	9th	68
2019	Dallara; F2 2018	Mecachrome; V634T V6 t	P	(Indonesia) Sean Gelael	20	0	0	1	0	17th	15	9th	68
2020	Dallara; F2 2018	Mecachrome; V634T V6 t	P	(Germany) Mick Schumacher	24	2	0	2	10	1st	215	1st	392
2020	Dallara; F2 2018	Mecachrome; V634T V6 t	P	(Russia) Robert Shwartzman	24	4	0	1	6	4th	177	1st	392
2021	Dallara; F2 2018	Mecachrome; V634T V6 t	P	(Russia) Robert Shwartzman	23	2	0	3	8	2nd	192	1st	444.5
2021	Dallara; F2 2018	Mecachrome; V634T V6 t	P	(Australia) Oscar Piastri	23	6	5	6	11	1st	252.5	1st	444.5
2022	Dallara; F2 2018	Mecachrome; V634T V6 t	P	(Norway) Dennis Hauger	28	2	0	3	4	10th	115	4th	241
2022	Dallara; F2 2018	Mecachrome; V634T V6 t	P	(India) Jehan Daruvala	28	1	0	2	8	7th	126	4th	241
2023	Dallara; F2 2018	Mecachrome; V634T V6 t	P	(Denmark) Frederik Vesti	25	6	1	1	10	2nd	192	2nd	322
2023	Dallara; F2 2018	Mecachrome; V634T V6 t	P	(United Kingdom) Oliver Bearman	26	4	3	2	6	6th	130	2nd	322
2024	Dallara; F2 2024	Mecachrome; V634T V6 t	P	(United Kingdom) Oliver Bearman	24	3	0	1	3	12th	75	5th	194
2024	Dallara; F2 2024	Mecachrome; V634T V6 t	P	(Italy) Gabriele Minì	2	0	0	0	1	27th	6	5th	194
2024	Dallara; F2 2024	Mecachrome; V634T V6 t	P	(Italy) Andrea Kimi Antonelli	26	2	0	4	3	6th	113	5th	194
2025	Dallara; F2 2024	Mecachrome; V634T V6 t	P	(Colombia) Sebastián Montoya	27	0	0	2	3	12th	91	6th	163
2025	Dallara; F2 2024	Mecachrome; V634T V6 t	P	(Italy) Gabriele Minì	27	0	0	3	3	13th	72	6th	163
2026	Dallara; F2 2024	Mecachrome; V634T V6 t	P	(Colombia) Sebastián Montoya	24	0	0	1	1	17th	30	10th	51*
2026	Dallara; F2 2024	Mecachrome; V634T V6 t	P	(Spain) Mari Boya	25	0	0	0	0	20th	21	10th	51*

* Season still in progress.

==== In detail ====
(key)

Year	Drivers	1	2	3	4	5	6	7	8	9	10	11	12	13	14	15	16	17	18	19	20	21	22	23	24	25	26	27	28	29	T.C.	Points
2017		BHR; FEA	BHR; SPR	CAT; FEA	CAT; SPR	MCO; FEA	MCO; SPR	BAK; FEA	BAK; SPR	RBR; FEA	RBR; SPR	SIL; FEA	SIL; SPR	HUN; FEA	HUN; SPR	SPA; FEA	SPA; SPR	MNZ; FEA	MNZ; SPR	JER; FEA	JER; SPR	YAS; FEA	YAS; SPR								2nd	380
2017	(Monaco) Charles Leclerc	3^{P}	1^{F}	1^{P}	4	Ret^{P F}	18^{†}	1^{P F}	2^{F}	1^{P}	Ret	1^{P}	5^{F}	4	4	DSQ^{P}	5	17	9	1^{P}	7	2	1								2nd	380
2017	(Italy) Antonio Fuoco	9	11	13	Ret	11	10	Ret	12	3	5	16	12	Ret	17^{F}	3	7	1	3	3	5	DSQ	11								2nd	380
2018		BHR; FEA	BHR; SPR	BAK; FEA	BAK; SPR	CAT; FEA	CAT; SPR	MCO; FEA	MCO; SPR	LEC; FEA	LEC; SPR	RBR; FEA	RBR; SPR	SIL; FEA	SIL; SPR	HUN; FEA	HUN; SPR	SPA; FEA	SPA; SPR	MNZ; FEA	MNZ; SPR	SOC; FEA	SOC; SPR	YAS; FEA	YAS; SPR						5th	231
2018	(Indonesia) Sean Gelael	7	16	10	Ret	Ret	6	2	Ret	Ret	18	13	Ret	Ret	15	13	11	16	Ret	11	Ret	DNS	12	17	Ret						5th	231
2018	(Netherlands) Nyck de Vries	6	5^{F}	Ret	2	2	Ret	Ret	9	5^{F}	1	Ret	14	7	6	1	7	1^{P F}	4	9	17	3^{P F}	4	4	5						5th	231
2019		BHR; FEA	BHR; SPR	BAK; FEA	BAK; SPR	CAT; FEA	CAT; SPR	MCO; FEA	MCO; SPR	LEC; FEA	LEC; SPR	RBR; FEA	RBR; SPR	SIL; FEA	SIL; SPR	HUN; FEA	HUN; SPR	SPA; FEA	SPA; SPR	MNZ; FEA	MNZ; SPR	SOC; FEA	SOC; SPR	YAS; FEA	YAS; SPR						9th	68
2019	(Germany) Mick Schumacher	8	6	Ret	5	15	12	13	11	Ret	Ret	18	4	11	6	8	1	C	C	NC^{F}	6^{F}	Ret	Ret	9	11						9th	68
2019	(Indonesia) Sean Gelael	Ret	10	6	8	9	9	Ret	15^{F}	Ret	17	16	12	WD	WD	15	17	C	C	9	Ret	11	7	17	Ret						9th	68
2020		RBR; FEA	RBR; SPR	RBR; FEA	RBR; SPR	HUN; FEA	HUN; SPR	SIL; FEA	SIL; SPR	SIL; FEA	SIL; SPR	CAT; FEA	CAT; SPR	SPA; FEA	SPA; SPR	MNZ; FEA	MNZ; SPR	MUG; FEA	MUG; SPR	SOC; FEA	SOC; SPR	BHR; FEA	BHR; SPR	BHR; FEA	BHR; SPR						1st	392
2020	(Germany) Mick Schumacher	11	7	4	Ret	3	3	9	14	7	2	6	3	3	2	1	3	5	4	1	3	4	7	6^{F}	18^{F}						1st	392
2020	(Russia) Robert Shwartzman	3	4	1	Ret	1	4	14	13	8	13	2	13	5^{F}	1	9	5	Ret	9	11	10	8	1	4	5						1st	392
2021		BHR; SP1	BHR; SP2	BHR; FEA	MCO; SP1	MCO; SP2	MCO; FEA	BAK; SP1	BAK; SP2	BAK; FEA	SIL; SP1	SIL; SP2	SIL; FEA	MNZ; SP1	MNZ; SP2	MNZ; FEA	SOC; SP1	SOC; SP2	SOC; FEA	JED; SP1	JED; SP2	JED; FEA	YAS; SP1	YAS; SP2	YAS; FEA						1st	444.5
2021	(Russia) Robert Shwartzman	4	Ret	7^{F}	Ret	10^{F}	4	1	5	3	1	15	5	6	3	6	3	C	4	5^{F}	3	2	4	2	5						1st	444.5
2021	(Australia) Oscar Piastri	5	1	19^{†}	8	2	2	Ret	8^{F}	2	6^{F}	4^{F}	3^{P}	4	7^{F}	1^{P}	9	C	1^{P}	8	1^{F}	1^{P F}	3	Ret	1^{P}						1st	444.5
2022		BHR; SPR	BHR; FEA	JED; SPR	JED; FEA	IMO; SPR	IMO; FEA	CAT; SPR	CAT; FEA	MCO; SPR	MCO; FEA	BAK; SPR	BAK; FEA	SIL; SPR	SIL; FEA	RBR; SPR	RBR; FEA	LEC; SPR	LEC; FEA	HUN; SPR	HUN; FEA	SPA; SPR	SPA; FEA	ZAN; SPR	ZAN; FEA	MNZ; SPR	MNZ; FEA	YAS; SPR	YAS; FEA		4th	241
2022	(Norway) Dennis Hauger	9	19^{†}	16	6	3	Ret	12	13	1	7	Ret^{F}	1	15	Ret	9	4	12	16	Ret	19^{F}	10	12	3	4	9^{F}	4	4	4		4th	241
2022	(India) Jehan Daruvala	2	12	7	3	2	9^{F}	4	Ret	2	8	2	4	8	7	11	12	2	7	17	11	DNS	20^{F}	16	10	3	1	Ret	13		4th	241
2023		BHR; SPR	BHR; FEA	JED; SPR	JED; FEA	ALB; SPR	ALB; FEA	BAK; SPR	BAK; FEA	MCO; SPR	MCO; FEA	CAT; SPR	CAT; FEA	RBR; SPR	RBR; FEA	SIL; SPR	SIL; FEA	HUN; SPR	HUN; FEA	SPA; SPR	SPA; FEA	ZAN; SPR	ZAN; FEA	MNZ; SPR	MNZ; FEA	YAS; SPR	YAS; FEA				2nd	322
2023	(Denmark) Frederik Vesti	17	Ret	6	1	8	4^{F}	2	4	9	1^{P}	1	5	9	3	1	Ret	9	2	6	DNS	7	Ret	1	Ret	1	3				2nd	322
2023	(United Kingdom) Oliver Bearman	15^{F}	14	Ret	10	7	17	1^{F}	1^{P}	Ret	11	7	1^{P}	8	5	6	8	3	12	12	7^{P}	3	Ret	6	1	10	Ret				2nd	322
2024		BHR; SPR	BHR; FEA	JED; SPR	JED; FEA	ALB; SPR	ALB; FEA	IMO; SPR	IMO; FEA	MCO; SPR	MCO; FEA	CAT; SPR	CAT; FEA	RBR; SPR	RBR; FEA	SIL; SPR	SIL; FEA	HUN; SPR	HUN; FEA	SPA; SPR	SPA; FEA	MNZ; SPR	MNZ; FEA	BAK; SPR	BAK; FEA	LUS; SPR	LUS; FEA	YAS; SPR	YAS; FEA		5th	194
2024	(United Kingdom) Oliver Bearman	16	15	WD	WD	14	9	5	19	11	4	21	14	1	Ret	Ret	7	10	15	7	Ret	1	7			1	12^{F}	4	5		5th	194
2024	(Italy) Gabriele Minì																							3	Ret						5th	194
2024	(Italy) Andrea Kimi Antonelli	14	10	6	6	Ret	4	10	4	4^{F}	7	15	12^{F}	15	13	1^{F}	Ret	14	1^{F}	6	9	18	4	7	3	19†	Ret	WD	WD		5th	194
2025		ALB; SPR	ALB; FEA	BHR; SPR	BHR; FEA	JED; SPR	JED; FEA	IMO; SPR	IMO; FEA	MCO; SPR	MCO; FEA	CAT; SPR	CAT; FEA	RBR; SPR	RBR; FEA	SIL; SPR	SIL; FEA	SPA; SPR	SPA; FEA	HUN; SPR	HUN; FEA	MNZ; SPR	MNZ; FEA	BAK; SPR	BAK; FEA	LUS; SPR	LUS; FEA	YAS; SPR	YAS; FEA		6th	163
2025	(Colombia) Sebastián Montoya	6	C	Ret	19	13	Ret	9	8	6	3	11	2	5	4^{F}	2^{F}	5	15	21†	Ret	15	10	9	15	9	4	5	12	Ret		6th	163
2025	(Italy) Gabriele Minì	7^{F}	C	7	9	6	9	15	18^{F}	2	Ret	Ret	10	14†	Ret	14	Ret	3	6	14^{F}	17	7	7	7	4	12	13	9	3		6th	163
2026		ALB; SPR	ALB; FEA	MIA; SPR	MIA; FEA	MTL; SPR	MTL; FEA	MCO; SPR	MCO; FEA	CAT; SPR	CAT; FEA	RBR; SPR	RBR; FEA	SIL; SPR	SIL; FEA	SPA; SPR	SPA; FEA	HUN; SPR	HUN; FEA	MNZ; SPR	MNZ; FEA	MAD; SPR	MAD; FEA	BAK; SPR	BAK; FE1	BAK; FE2	LUS; SPR	LUS; FEA	YAS; SPR	YAS; FEA	10th	51*
2026	(Colombia) Sebastián Montoya	9	9	16	9	17†	4	13	8	10	16	2	Ret	Ret	Ret	9	11	Ret	16	14	18	17	13	7	DNS	17^{F}					10th	51*
2026	(Spain) Mari Boya	Ret	13	17	7	15	8	14	16	15	21	11	Ret	13	15	11	9	17	15	13	13	8	11	Ret	Ret	6					10th	51*

* Season still in progress.

=== FIA Formula 3 Championship ===
Year	Chassis	Engine	Tyres	Drivers	Races	Wins	Poles	F. Laps	Podiums	D.C.	Pts	T.C.	Pts
2019	Dallara; F3 2019	Mecachrome; V634 V6	P	(New Zealand) Marcus Armstrong	16	3	1	4	7	2nd	158	1st	527
2019	Dallara; F3 2019	Mecachrome; V634 V6	P	(India) Jehan Daruvala	16	2	1	1	7	3rd	157	1st	527
2019	Dallara; F3 2019	Mecachrome; V634 V6	P	(Russia) Robert Shwartzman	16	3	2	2	10	1st	212	1st	527
2020	Dallara; F3 2019	Mecachrome; V634 V6	P	(Australia) Oscar Piastri	18	2	0	3	6	1st	164	1st	470.5
2020	Dallara; F3 2019	Mecachrome; V634 V6	P	(Denmark) Frederik Vesti	18	3	1	2	4	4th	146.5	1st	470.5
2020	Dallara; F3 2019	Mecachrome; V634 V6	P	(United States) Logan Sargeant	18	2	3	2	6	3rd	160	1st	470.5
2021	Dallara; F3 2019	Mecachrome; V634 V6	P	(Norway) Dennis Hauger	20	4	3	4	9	1st	205	2nd	377
2021	Dallara; F3 2019	Mecachrome; V634 V6	P	(Monaco) Arthur Leclerc	20	2	1	2	3	10th	79	2nd	377
2021	Dallara; F3 2019	Mecachrome; V634 V6	P	(United Kingdom) Olli Caldwell	20	1	0	1	4	8th	93	2nd	377
2022	Dallara; F3 2019	Mecachrome; V634 V6	P	(Monaco) Arthur Leclerc	18	1	0	1	2	6th	114	1st	355
2022	Dallara; F3 2019	Mecachrome; V634 V6	P	(United States) Jak Crawford	18	1	0	2	5	7th	109	1st	355
2022	Dallara; F3 2019	Mecachrome; V634 V6	P	(United Kingdom) Oliver Bearman	18	1	0	1	8	3rd	132	1st	355
2023	Dallara; F3 2019	Mecachrome; V634 V6	P	(Estonia) Paul Aron	18	1	0	2	4	3rd	112	1st	327
2023	Dallara; F3 2019	Mecachrome; V634 V6	P	(Sweden) Dino Beganovic	18	0	0	1	4	6th	96	1st	327
2023	Dallara; F3 2019	Mecachrome; V634 V6	P	(United Kingdom) Zak O'Sullivan	18	4	1	3	5	2nd	119	1st	327
2024	Dallara; F3 2019	Mecachrome; V634 V6	P	(Sweden) Dino Beganovic	20	2	1	3	4	6th	109	1st	352
2024	Dallara; F3 2019	Mecachrome; V634 V6	P	(Italy) Gabriele Minì	20	1	1	1	5	2nd	130	1st	352
2024	Dallara; F3 2019	Mecachrome; V634 V6	P	(United Kingdom) Arvid Lindblad	20	4	0	1	5	4th	113	1st	352
2025	Dallara; F3 2025	Mecachrome; V634 V6	P	(Italy) Brando Badoer	19	0	0	0	0	25th	13	7th	92
2025	Dallara; F3 2025	Mecachrome; V634 V6	P	(Mexico) Noel León	19	0	0	1	2	17th	36	7th	92
2025	Dallara; F3 2025	Mecachrome; V634 V6	P	(United States) Ugo Ugochukwu	19	0	0	0	2	16th	43	7th	92
2026	Dallara; F3 2025	Mecachrome; V634 V6	P	(New Zealand) Louis Sharp	13	0	0	2	0	21st	21	7th	75
2026	Dallara; F3 2025	Mecachrome; V634 V6	P	(United States) Alex Powell	5	0	0	0	1	23rd	14	7th	75
2026	Dallara; F3 2025	Mecachrome; V634 V6	P	(Australia) James Wharton	18	1	0	3	2	17th	39	7th	75
2026	Dallara; F3 2025	Mecachrome; V634 V6	P	(Mexico) José Garfias	19	0	0	0	0	29th	1	7th	75

==== In detail ====
(key)

Year	Drivers	1	2	3	4	5	6	7	8	9	10	11	12	13	14	15	16	17	18	19	20	21	T.C.	Points
2019		CAT; FEA	CAT; SPR	LEC; FEA	LEC; SPR	RBR; FEA	RBR; SPR	SIL; FEA	SIL; SPR	HUN; FEA	HUN; SPR	SPA; FEA	SPA; SPR	MNZ; FEA	MNZ; SPR	SOC; FEA	SOC; SPR						1st	527
2019	(New Zealand) Marcus Armstrong	3	5	6	6^{F}	3^{P}	19	3	4	8	1^{F}	8	1^{F}	21	14	1	2^{F}						1st	527
2019	(India) Jehan Daruvala	7	1^{F}	1	3	4	2	2	28†	11	7	3^{P}	5	2	13	5	14						1st	527
2019	(Russia) Robert Shwartzman	1^{P}	4	2	1	5	3	5	2^{F}	5	Ret	2	3	1^{F}	8	2^{P}	3						1st	527
2020		RBR; FEA	RBR; SPR	RBR; FEA	RBR; SPR	HUN; FEA	HUN; SPR	SIL; FEA	SIL; SPR	SIL; FEA	SIL; SPR	CAT; FEA	CAT; SPR	SPA; FEA	SPA; SPR	MNZ; FEA	MNZ; SPR	MUG; FEA	MUG; SPR				1st	470.5
2020	(Australia) Oscar Piastri	1	8^{F}	4	5^{F}	2	2^{F}	2	Ret	7	6	6	1	5	6	3	Ret	11	7				1st	470.5
2020	(Denmark) Frederik Vesti	4	6	1^{P F}	8	Ret	Ret	5	4	4	8	Ret	21	6	2	1	23†	1	9^{F}				1st	470.5
2020	(United States) Logan Sargeant	2	27	6	2	6	4	3^{P}	5^{F}	1^{P}	Ret	3^{P}	5	8	1^{F}	26	24†	6	Ret				1st	470.5
2021		CAT; SP1	CAT; SP2	CAT; FEA	LEC; SP1	LEC; SP2	LEC; FEA	RBR; SP1	RBR; SP2	RBR; FEA	HUN; SP1	HUN; SP2	HUN; FEA	SPA; SP1	SPA; SP2	SPA; FEA	ZAN; SP1	ZAN; SP2	ZAN; FEA	SOC; SP1	SOC; SP2	SOC; FEA	2nd	377
2021	(Norway) Dennis Hauger	8	25^{F}	1^{P F}	9	2	2	1^{F}	3	2^{P}	5	5	1	14	9	8	7	27†	1^{P F}	2	C	24	2nd	377
2021	(Monaco) Arthur Leclerc	28	24	13	12	1	13	Ret	6^{F}	Ret	13	11	2^{P}	13	10	10	1	7	9	7	C	7^{F}	2nd	377
2021	(United Kingdom) Olli Caldwell	6	1	4	10	4	Ret	2	9	3	2	29^{F}	8	16	15	11	10	6	14	14	C	10	2nd	377
2022		BHR; SPR	BHR; FEA	IMO; SPR	IMO; FEA	CAT; SPR	CAT; FEA	SIL; SPR	SIL; FEA	RBR; SPR	RBR; FEA	HUN; SPR	HUN; FEA	SPA; SPR	SPA; FEA	ZAN; SPR	ZAN; FEA	MNZ; SPR	MNZ; FEA				1st	355
2022	(Monaco) Arthur Leclerc	5	2	13	4	4	16	8	1	4^{F}	4	27	8	5	11	12	12	8	5				1st	355
2022	(United States) Jak Crawford	27	7	3	2	2^{F}	6	10	6^{F}	1	22	20	5	11	17	9	6	7	3				1st	355
2022	(United Kingdom) Oliver Bearman	2	6	12^{F}	17	12	5	9	3	16	3	5	3	1	3	11	25	2	2				1st	355
2023		BHR; SPR	BHR; FEA	ALB; SPR	ALB; FEA	MCO; SPR	MCO; FEA	CAT; SPR	CAT; FEA	RBR; SPR	RBR; FEA	SIL; SPR	SIL; FEA	HUN; SPR	HUN; FEA	SPA; SPR	SPA; FEA	MNZ; SPR	MNZ; FEA				1st	327
2023	(Estonia) Paul Aron	5	12	3	6	10	3	5	5	1^{F}	25	12^{F}	4	4	5	3	8	Ret	7				1st	327
2023	(Sweden) Dino Beganovic	4	3	5	13	12	2	Ret	3	8	5^{F}	13	14	10	2	22	16	13	9				1st	327
2023	(United Kingdom) Zak O'Sullivan	12	11	1	5	13	7	1^{F}	8	4	1	16	18^{F}	22	1^{P F}	15	12	11	2				1st	327
2024		BHR; SPR	BHR; FEA	ALB; SPR	ALB; FEA	IMO; SPR	IMO; FEA	MCO; SPR	MCO; FEA	CAT; SPR	CAT; FEA	RBR; SPR	RBR; FEA	SIL; SPR	SIL; FEA	HUN; SPR	HUN; FEA	SPA; SPR	SPA; FEA	MNZ; SPR	MNZ; FEA		1st	352
2024	(Sweden) Dino Beganovic	29	13^{P F}	13	1^{F}	4	5	7^{F}	6	8	8	15	3	11	19	3	9	1	11	4	9		1st	352
2024	(Italy) Gabriele Minì	7	6	6	3	6	6	11	1^{P}	Ret	21	6	2	6	2^{F}	14	11	2	13	9	DSQ		1st	352
2024	(United Kingdom) Arvid Lindblad	1	8	2	11	8	7	Ret	4	9	1	Ret	7	1^{F}	1	15	28†	15	Ret	12	16		1st	352
2025		ALB; SPR	ALB; FEA	BHR; SPR	BHR; FEA	IMO; SPR	IMO; FEA	MCO; SPR	MCO; FEA	CAT; SPR	CAT; FEA	RBR; SPR	RBR; FEA	SIL; SPR	SIL; FEA	SPA; SPR	SPA; FEA	HUN; SPR	HUN; FEA	MNZ; SPR	MNZ; FEA		7th	92
2025	(Italy) Brando Badoer	19	26	22	21	16	19	20	Ret	17	Ret	23	Ret	Ret	12	9	C	6	7	27	14		7th	92
2025	(Mexico) Noel León	10	13	11	17	9	28†	Ret	Ret	10	18	10	11	7	3	15	C	Ret	17^{F}	19	3		7th	92
2025	(United States) Ugo Ugochukwu	12	10	Ret	27	8	14	13	14	22	20	16	4	5	21	2	C	2	Ret	9	Ret		7th	92
2026		ALB; SPR	ALB; FEA	MCO; SPR	MCO; FEA	CAT; SPR	CAT; FEA	RBR; SPR	RBR; FEA	SIL; SPR	SIL; FEA	SPA; SPR	SPA; FEA	HUN; SPR	HUN; FEA	MNZ; SPR	MNZ; FEA	MAD; SPR	MAD; FE1	MAD; FE2			7th	75
2026	(New Zealand) Louis Sharp	16^{F}	WD	17	12	9	19	14^{F}	13	8	4	13	16	12	8								7th	75
2026	(United States) Alex Powell															19	14	3	7	13			7th	75
2026	(Australia) James Wharton	7	WD	15^{F}	18^{F}	1^{F}	12	4	11	10	11	27	17	8	7	21	10	2	10	16			7th	75
2026	(Mexico) José Garfias	24	24	10	15	27	21	24	23	26	21	19	22	15	11	17	11	22	Ret	26			7th	75

=== Formula Regional European Championship ===
Year	Car	Drivers	Races	Wins	Poles	F. Laps	Podiums	D.C.	Pts	T.C.	Pts
2019	Tatuus F3 T-318- Alfa Romeo	(Denmark) Frederik Vesti	24	13	10	9	20	1st	467	1st	870
2019	Tatuus F3 T-318- Alfa Romeo	(United Kingdom) Olli Caldwell	24	1	1	0	7	5th	213	1st	870
2019	Tatuus F3 T-318- Alfa Romeo	(Brazil) Enzo Fittipaldi	24	2	2	5	13	2nd	336	1st	870
2020	Tatuus F3 T-318- Alfa Romeo	(Denmark) Oliver Rasmussen	22	6	5	3	13	3rd	343	1st	842
2020	Tatuus F3 T-318- Alfa Romeo	(Brazil) Gianluca Petecof	23	4	5	7	14	1st	359	1st	842
2020	Tatuus F3 T-318- Alfa Romeo	(Monaco) Arthur Leclerc	23	6	8	2	15	2nd	343	1st	842
2020	Tatuus F3 T-318- Alfa Romeo	(United Kingdom) Jamie Chadwick	23	0	0	0	1	9th	80	1st	842
2021	Tatuus F3 T-318- Alpine	(Estonia) Paul Aron	20	2	2	1	7	3rd	197	3rd	346
2021	Tatuus F3 T-318- Alpine	(Spain) David Vidales	20	1	1	1	3	10th	102	3rd	346
2021	Tatuus F3 T-318- Alpine	(Sweden) Dino Beganovic	20	0	1	2	1	13th	53	3rd	346
2022	Tatuus F3 T-318- Alpine	(Estonia) Paul Aron	19	6	7	4	9	3rd	241	1st	531
2022	Tatuus F3 T-318- Alpine	(Sweden) Dino Beganovic	20	4	4	2	13	1st	282	1st	531
2022	Tatuus F3 T-318- Alpine	(Colombia) Sebastián Montoya	20	0	0	0	0	13th	44	1st	531
2022	Tatuus F3 T-318- Alpine	(United Arab Emirates) Hamda Al Qubaisi	15	0	0	0	0	38th	0	1st	531
2022	Tatuus F3 T-318- Alpine	(United Arab Emirates) Amna Al Qubaisi†	4	0	0	0	0	NC	0	1st	531
2023	Tatuus F3 T-318- Alpine	(Spain) Lorenzo Fluxá	20	0	0	0	1	7th	88	1st	512
2023	Tatuus F3 T-318- Alpine	(Brazil) Rafael Câmara	20	2	3	1	5	5th	173	1st	512
2023	Tatuus F3 T-318- Alpine	(Italy) Andrea Kimi Antonelli	20	5	4	5	11	1st	300	1st	512
2024	Tatuus F3 T-318- Alpine	(United States) Ugo Ugochukwu	20	1	1	0	2	11th	76	1st	575
2024	Tatuus F3 T-318- Alpine	(Brazil) Rafael Câmara	20	7	7	7	12	1st	309	1st	575
2024	Tatuus F3 T-318- Alpine	(Australia) James Wharton	20	4	5	2	10	2nd	236	1st	575
2025	Tatuus F3 T-318- Alpine	(United Arab Emirates) Rashid Al Dhaheri	19	0	1	3	3	8th	105	2nd	434
2025	Tatuus F3 T-318- Alpine	(United Kingdom) Freddie Slater	20	8	6	7	12	1st	313	2nd	434
2025	Tatuus F3 T-318- Alpine	(France) Doriane Pin	8	0	0	0	0	30th	0	2nd	434
2025	Tatuus F3 T-318- Alpine	(United States) Alex Powell†	2	0	0	0	0	NC	0	2nd	434
2025	Tatuus F3 T-318- Alpine	(Australia) Jack Beeton	19	0	0	0	0	13th	32	2nd	434
2025	Tatuus F3 T-318- Alpine	(China) Yuanpu Cui†	4	0	0	0	0	NC	0	2nd	434
2026	Tatuus T-326-Toyota	(United Kingdom) Kean Nakamura-Berta (Note: Nakamura-Berta is a Japanese and Slovak driver racing under the British flag.)	19	3	5	2	8	3rd	201	3rd	323
2026	Tatuus T-326-Toyota	(Latvia) Tomass Štolcermanis	19	0	0	0	0	17th	32	3rd	323
2026	Tatuus T-326-Toyota	(Colombia) Salim Hanna	19	1	0	1	4	7th	92	3rd	323

† Guest driver ineligible to score points.

==== In detail ====
(key)

Year	Drivers	1	2	3	4	5	6	7	8	9	10	11	12	13	14	15	16	17	18	19	20	21	22	23	24	25	T.C.	Points
2019		LEC; 1	LEC; 2	LEC; 3	VLL; 1	VLL; 2	VLL; 3	HUN; 1	HUN; 2	HUN; 3	RBR; 1	RBR; 2	RBR; 3	IMO; 1	IMO; 2	IMO; 3	IMO; 4	CAT; 1	CAT; 2	CAT; 3	MUG; 1	MUG; 2	MUG; 3	MNZ; 1	MNZ; 2	MNZ; 3	1st	870
2019	(Denmark) Frederik Vesti	1	2	1^{P F}	5	1	C	1^{P F}	1^{P}	1^{P}	1^{P F}	1^{P F}	3^{P}	3^{F}	1^{P F}	3^{P F}	6^{F}	1	3	10	1^{P F}	1	4	2	3	1	1st	870
2019	(United Kingdom) Olli Caldwell	4	DSQ^{P}	4	8	3	C	3	3	2	7	Ret	7	2	2	Ret	1	7	6	4	9	11	10	5	8	7	1st	870
2019	(Brazil) Enzo Fittipaldi	2^{P F}	1^{F}	2	2^{F}	2	C	2	2^{F}	3	4	5	2	4	7	1	Ret	5^{P}	2	3	4	4	6	13†	4	2^{F}	1st	870
2020		MIS; 1	MIS; 2	MIS; 3	LEC; 1	LEC; 2	LEC; 3	RBR; 1	RBR; 2	RBR; 3	MUG; 1	MUG; 2	MUG; 3	MNZ; 1	MNZ; 2	MNZ; 3	CAT; 1	CAT; 2	CAT; 3	IMO; 1	IMO; 2	IMO; 3	VLL; 1	VLL; 2	VLL; 3		1st	842
2020	(Denmark) Oliver Rasmussen	1	3	3	6	5	4	3	1	3	3^{P}	6	3	4^{F}	1^{F}	4	1	1^{F}	5	DNS^{P}	6	6	3^{P}	C^{P}	1^{P}		1st	842
2020	(Brazil) Gianluca Petecof	4	2^{F}	1	2	1^{P}	2^{P F}	1^{P F}	2^{P F}	1^{P F}	4	3	2^{F}	2	6	2^{F}	5	6	3	8	3	4	4	C	5		1st	842
2020	(Monaco) Arthur Leclerc	Ret^{P}	1^{P}	2^{P F}	1^{P F}	2	1	2	3	2	1	1^{P}	1^{P}	3	9†	6^{P}	2	5	4	3	Ret^{P}	2	6	C	Ret		1st	842
2020	(United Kingdom) Jamie Chadwick	3	8	6	10	10†	9	Ret	10	5	9	7	8	10	Ret	8	10	9	10	Ret	9	10	8	C	7		1st	842
2021		IMO; 1	IMO; 2	CAT; 1	CAT; 2	MCO; 1	MCO; 2	LEC; 1	LEC; 2	ZAN; 1	ZAN; 2	SPA; 1	SPA; 2	RBR; 1	RBR; 2	VAL; 1	VAL; 2	MUG; 1	MUG; 2	MNZ; 1	MNZ; 2						3rd	346
2021	(Estonia) Paul Aron	4	2	3	4	3	Ret	14	26	4	7	18	8	3	13	4	12	1^{P}	1^{P F}	6	2						3rd	346
2021	(Spain) David Vidales	1^{P}	7^{F}	Ret	Ret	7	6	11	8	11	16	Ret	25	13	7	2	5	3	15	10	Ret						3rd	346
2021	(Sweden) Dino Beganovic	8	19	15	10	17	Ret	10	11	8	19	4	14	14	11	10	Ret^{F}	Ret	2	5	Ret^{P F}						3rd	346
2022		MNZ; 1	MNZ; 2	IMO; 1	IMO; 2	MCO; 1	MCO; 2	LEC; 1	LEC; 2	ZAN; 1	ZAN; 2	HUN; 1	HUN; 2	SPA; 1	SPA; 2	RBR; 1	RBR; 2	CAT; 1	CAT; 2	MUG; 1	MUG; 2						1st	531
2022	(Estonia) Paul Aron	27	1^{P F}	3	6	25	DNQ	1^{F}	3	1^{P}	1^{P F}	6	7	4^{F}	4^{P}	Ret^{P}	16	1^{P}	4	1^{P}	11						1st	531
2022	(Sweden) Dino Beganovic	1^{P F}	2	1	2^{F}	2	1^{P}	2^{P}	DSQ	4	3	7	16	1^{P}	3	4	2	11	10	4	3						1st	531
2022	(Colombia) Sebastián Montoya	8	8	4	Ret	17	14	11	11	6	4	16	8	16	13	32	17	13	15	12	20						1st	531
2022	(United Arab Emirates) Hamda Al Qubaisi	30	Ret	Ret	31	27	DNQ	29	26	30	27	31	26	26	Ret	29	24										1st	531
2022	(United Arab Emirates) Amna Al Qubaisi																	Ret	31	Ret	Ret						1st	531
2023		IMO; 1	IMO; 2	CAT; 1	CAT; 2	HUN; 1	HUN; 2	SPA; 1	SPA; 2	MUG; 1	MUG; 2	LEC; 1	LEC; 2	RBR; 1	RBR; 2	MNZ; 1	MNZ; 2	ZAN; 1	ZAN; 2	HOC; 1	HOC; 2						1st	512
2023	(Spain) Lorenzo Fluxá	4	Ret	4	11	9	2	5	20	7	Ret	11	Ret	11	8	18	4	8	8	12	9						1st	512
2023	(Brazil) Rafael Câmara	3	Ret	11	6	7	10	1^{P F}	5	6	2	8	12	1^{P}	Ret	Ret^{P}	2	7	Ret	4	4						1st	512
2023	(Italy) Andrea Kimi Antonelli	2	Ret	2^{P F}	2^{F}	5	6	4	1	2	1^{P F}	5	1^{P F}	4	3	11	1^{P}	2	1^{F}	6	6						1st	512
2024		HOC; 1	HOC; 2	SPA; 1	SPA; 2	ZAN; 1	ZAN; 2	HUN; 1	HUN; 2	MUG; 1	MUG; 2	LEC; 1	LEC; 2	IMO; 1	IMO; 2	RBR; 1	RBR; 2	CAT; 1	CAT; 2	MNZ; 1	MNZ; 2						1st	575
2024	(United States) Ugo Ugochukwu	7	Ret	15	21	28	10	8	3	10	13	DSQ	DSQ	15	5	8	20	Ret	8	1^{P}	7						1st	575
2024	(Brazil) Rafael Câmara	1^{P F}	2	1	1^{P F}	2^{F}	1^{P F}	3	6	5	5	1^{P F}	6^{P}	1^{P F}	9^{P}	11	16	3	4	2^{F}	1						1st	575
2024	(Australia) James Wharton	3	Ret^{P}	DNS	3	13^{P}	14	6	4	7	1	6	9	3	3	1^{P}	5	1^{P F}	1^{P F}	3	3						1st	575
2025		MIS; 1	MIS; 2	SPA; 1	SPA; 2	ZAN; 1	ZAN; 2	HUN; 1	HUN; 2	LEC; 1	LEC; 2	IMO; 1	IMO; 2	RBR; 1	RBR; 2	CAT; 1	CAT; 2	HOC; 1	HOC; 2	MNZ; 1	MNZ; 2						2nd*	434*
2025	(United Arab Emirates) Rashid Al Dhaheri	3	15	6	12^{P}	8	13	4	2^{F}	DNS	2^{F}	Ret	12	7	5^{F}	8	18	12	12	5	20						2nd*	434*
2025	(United Kingdom) Freddie Slater	Ret^{P}	2^{F}	1^{P F}	Ret	1^{F}	3	5	1	1^{P F}	1^{P}	2	DSQ	12	4	2^{P}	5	1^{F}	4	1^{F}	1^{P F}						2nd*	434*
2025	(France) Doriane Pin			19	Ret	20	24	19	17	17	Ret																2nd*	434*
2025	(United States) Alex Powell													22	21												2nd*	434*
2025	(Australia) Jack Beeton	6	7	8	10	9	17	14	Ret	10	Ret	21	Ret	23	6	9	11	18	14	Ret	DNS						2nd*	434*
2025	(China) Yuanpu Cui															18	25	13	20								2nd*	434*
2026		RBR; 1	RBR; 2	RBR; 3	ZAN; 1	ZAN; 2	SPA; 1	SPA; 2	SPA; 3	MNZ; 1	MNZ; 2	MNZ; 3	HUN; 1	HUN; 2	LEC; 1	LEC; 2	IMO; 1	IMO; 2	IMO; 3	HOC; 1	HOC; 2						3rd	323
2026	(United Kingdom) Kean Nakamura-Berta	1^{P}	6	25†^{P}	DSQ	2^{P F}	3^{F}	C	5	1^{P}	5	Ret	10	3	1^{P}	3	15	10	9	2	6						3rd	323
2026	(Latvia) Tomass Štolcermanis	23	14	20	DSQ	7	16	C	27	17	7	18	5	Ret	14	11	Ret	11	4	Ret	Ret						3rd	323
2026	(Colombia) Salim Hanna	11	10	4	2	14	11	C	21	3	2	8	13	Ret	17	12	8	1^{F}	Ret	7	5						3rd	323

=== Formula Regional Middle East Championship/Trophy ===
Year	Car	Drivers	Races	Wins	Poles	F. Laps	Podiums	Points	D.C.	T.C.
2023	Tatuus F3 T-318-Alfa Romeo	(United Kingdom) Aiden Neate	15	0	0	0	1	58	12th	6th
2023	Tatuus F3 T-318-Alfa Romeo	(South Korea) Michael Shin	15	0	0	0	1	35	14th	6th
2023	Tatuus F3 T-318-Alfa Romeo	(Italy) Andrea Kimi Antonelli	15	3	3	5	7	192	1st	1st (Note: Entered as Mumbai Falcons)
2023	Tatuus F3 T-318-Alfa Romeo	(Brazil) Rafael Câmara	15	0	0	0	6	131	3rd	1st
2023	Tatuus F3 T-318-Alfa Romeo	(Spain) Lorenzo Fluxá	15	0	0	0	3	122	4th	1st
2023	Tatuus F3 T-318-Alfa Romeo	(Sweden) Dino Beganovic	6	2	0	1	2	62	11th	1st
2023	Tatuus F3 T-318-Alfa Romeo	Kirill Smal	9	0	0	0	1	32	15th	1st
2024	Tatuus F3 T-318-Alfa Romeo	(Brazil) Rafael Câmara	15	2	1	2	2	128	3rd	3rd
2024	Tatuus F3 T-318-Alfa Romeo	(Australia) James Wharton	15	0	0	0	2	111	6th	3rd
2024	Tatuus F3 T-318-Alfa Romeo	(United States) Ugo Ugochukwu	15	0	0	0	3	105	7th	3rd
2024	Tatuus F3 T-318-Alfa Romeo	(United Kingdom) Arvid Lindblad	9	1	0	0	1	33	13th	3rd
2025	Tatuus F3 T-318-Alfa Romeo	(United Kingdom) Freddie Slater	15	4	4	4	5	228	2nd	1st
2025	Tatuus F3 T-318-Alfa Romeo	(United Arab Emirates) Rashid Al Dhaheri	15	0	0	0	3	144	6th	1st
2025	Tatuus F3 T-318-Alfa Romeo	(Australia) Jack Beeton	15	1	0	0	2	65	13th	1st
2025	Tatuus F3 T-318-Alfa Romeo	(United Kingdom) Reza Seewooruthun	9	0	0	0	0	28	17th	1st
2025	Tatuus F3 T-318-Alfa Romeo	(France) Doriane Pin	6	0	0	0	0	0	29th	1st
2026	Tatuus T-326	(United Kingdom) Kean Nakamura-Berta	11	2	3	3	6	151	1st	1st
2026	Tatuus T-326	(United States) Sebastian Wheldon	11	0	1	1	3	71	5th	1st
2026	Tatuus T-326	(Colombia) Salim Hanna	11	1	0	0	1	54	10th	1st

=== Italian F4 Championship ===
Italian F4 Championship
Year	Car	Drivers	Races	Wins	Poles	F. Laps	Podiums	Points	D.C.	T.C.
2014	Tatuus F4-T014	(Canada) Lance Stroll	18	7	5	11	13	331	1st	1st
2014	Tatuus F4-T014	(Japan) Takashi Kasai	16	0	0	0	1	83	8th	1st
2014	Tatuus F4-T014	(France) Brandon Maïsano	21	6	8	0	17	406	1st (Note: Italian F4 Trophy)	1st
2015	Tatuus F4-T014	(Estonia) Ralf Aron	21	9	7	6	13	331	1st	1st
2015	Tatuus F4-T014	(China) Guanyu Zhou	21	3	2	0	9	223	2nd	1st
2015	Tatuus F4-T014	(Brazil) Giuliano Raucci	21	0	0	1	0	45	13th	1st
2015	Tatuus F4-T014	(Germany) Tim Zimmermann	3	0	0	0	0	2	26th	1st
2016	Tatuus F4-T014	(Germany) Mick Schumacher	19	5	4	5	10	216	2nd	1st
2016	Tatuus F4-T014	(Estonia) Jüri Vips	19	1	2	3	7	140	5th	1st
2016	Tatuus F4-T014	(United States) Juan Manuel Correa	19	3	2	1	4	105.5	6th	1st
2017	Tatuus F4-T014	(New Zealand) Marcus Armstrong	21	3	5	0	13	283	1st	2nd
2017	Tatuus F4-T014	(Brazil) Enzo Fittipaldi	21	0	0	0	0	89	9th	2nd
2017	Tatuus F4-T014	(Estonia) Jüri Vips	9	1	2	1	5	114	NC	2nd
2017	Tatuus F4-T014	(United States) Juan Manuel Correa	6	0	0	0	0	10	NC	2nd
2017	Tatuus F4-T014	(Austria) Lukas Dunner	3	0	0	0	0	2	NC	2nd
2018	Tatuus F4-T014	(Brazil) Enzo Fittipaldi	21	7	9	5	12	303	1st	1st
2018	Tatuus F4-T014	(United Kingdom) Olli Caldwell	21	4	4	2	11	262	3rd	1st
2018	Tatuus F4-T014	(Brazil) Gianluca Petecof	18	1	0	1	5	186	4th	1st
2018	Tatuus F4-T014	(Australia) Jack Doohan	6	0	0	0	0	9	20th	1st
2018	Tatuus F4-T014	(United Arab Emirates) Amna Al Qubaisi	18	0	0	0	0	0	34th	1st
2019	Tatuus F4-T014	(Brazil) Gianluca Petecof	21	4	2	2	8	233	2nd	2nd
2019	Tatuus F4-T014	(Estonia) Paul Aron	21	2	1	0	8	226	3rd	2nd
2019	Tatuus F4-T014	(Denmark) Oliver Rasmussen	21	0	2	1	2	126	7th	2nd
2019	Tatuus F4-T014	(Venezuela) Alessandro Famularo	21	0	0	0	1	54	12th	2nd
2019	Tatuus F4-T014	(United Arab Emirates) Amna Al Qubaisi	21	0	0	0	0	0	31st	12th (Note: Entered as Abu Dhabi Racing by Prema)
2019	Tatuus F4-T014	(United Arab Emirates) Hamda Al Qubaisi	6	0	0	0	0	0	42nd	12th
2020	Tatuus F4-T014	(Italy) Gabriele Minì	20	4	9	2	12	284	1st	1st
2020	Tatuus F4-T014	(Sweden) Dino Beganovic	20	1	2	4	6	179	3rd	1st
2020	Tatuus F4-T014	(Brazil) Gabriel Bortoleto	20	1	4	1	5	157	5th	1st
2020	Tatuus F4-T014	(Colombia) Sebastián Montoya	20	0	0	1	0	81	11th	1st
2020	Tatuus F4-T014	(Russia) Kirill Smal (Note: Kirill Smal raced for R-ace GP for 3 races in 2020.)	8	0	0	0	1	30	15th	1st
2020	Tatuus F4-T014	(United Arab Emirates) Hamda Al Qubaisi	21	0	0	0	0	3	17th	11th
2021	Tatuus F4-T014	(Russia) Kirill Smal	21	1	1	2	5	198	3rd	2nd
2021	Tatuus F4-T014	(Colombia) Sebastián Montoya	21	0	2	4	9	194	4th	2nd
2021	Tatuus F4-T014	(Denmark) Conrad Laursen	20	0	0	1	0	60	9th	2nd
2021	Tatuus F4-T014	(Italy) Andrea Kimi Antonelli	9	0	0	0	3	54	10th	2nd
2021	Tatuus F4-T014	(United Arab Emirates) Hamda Al Qubaisi	21	0	0	0	1	24	17th	2nd
2021	Tatuus F4-T014	(Austria) Charlie Wurz	6	0	0	0	0	20	20th	2nd
2021	Tatuus F4-T014	(France) Macéo Capietto	6	0	0	0	0	2	32nd	2nd
2022	Tatuus F4-T421	(Italy) Andrea Kimi Antonelli	20	13	14	14	15	362	1st	1st
2022	Tatuus F4-T421	(Brazil) Rafael Câmara	20	2	4	3	10	239	3rd	1st
2022	Tatuus F4-T421	(Austria) Charlie Wurz	20	1	1	0	6	198	4th	1st
2022	Tatuus F4-T421	(Australia) James Wharton	20	0	0	0	5	166	5th	1st
2022	Tatuus F4-T421	(United States) Ugo Ugochukwu	6	0	0	0	4	84	10th	1st
2022	Tatuus F4-T421	(Denmark) Conrad Laursen	20	0	0	1	1	81	11th	1st
2023	Tatuus F4-T421	(United States) Ugo Ugochukwu	21	3	3	4	13	280	2nd	1st
2023	Tatuus F4-T421	(United Kingdom) Arvid Lindblad	21	6	4	3	10	263.5	3rd	1st
2023	Tatuus F4-T421	(Australia) James Wharton	21	2	3	2	8	205.5	4th	1st
2023	Tatuus F4-T421	(Finland) Tuukka Taponen	21	1	1	0	7	196	5th	1st
2023	Tatuus F4-T421	(Italy) Nicola Lacorte	21	1	1	0	2	75	9th	1st
2023	Tatuus F4-T421	(United Arab Emirates) Rashid Al Dhaheri	20	0	0	0	0	68	10th	1st
2023	Tatuus F4-T421	(Jamaica) Alex Powell	6	0	0	0	0	1	24th	1st
2023	Tatuus F4-T421	(Brazil) Aurelia Nobels	16	0	0	0	0	0	26th	1st
2023	Tatuus F4-T421	(Philippines) Bianca Bustamante	3	0	0	0	0	0	44th	1st
2024	Tatuus F4-T421	(United Kingdom) Freddie Slater	20	15	11	10	16	365	1st	1st
2024	Tatuus F4-T421	(United States) Alex Powell	21	0	1	0	6	176	5th	1st
2024	Tatuus F4-T421	(United Kingdom) Kean Nakamura-Berta	21	1	0	0	5	170	6th	1st
2024	Tatuus F4-T421	(Latvia) Tomass Štolcermanis	21	0	0	1	1	97	9th	1st
2024	Tatuus F4-T421	(United Arab Emirates) Rashid Al Dhaheri	21	0	0	1	1	95	10th	1st
2024	Tatuus F4-T421	(United Kingdom) Dion Gowda	21	0	0	0	2	62	11th	1st
2024	Tatuus F4-T421	(Ukraine) Oleksandr Bondarev	6	0	0	0	0	0	30th	1st
2025	Tatuus F4-T421	(Japan) Kean Nakamura-Berta	20	9	9	3	17	342	1st	1st
2025	Tatuus F4-T421	(United States) Sebastian Wheldon	20	6	3	5	9	256	3rd	1st
2025	Tatuus F4-T421	(Colombia) Salim Hanna	20	0	1	0	6	180	4th	1st
2025	Tatuus F4-T421	(Italy) Zhenrui Chi	20	1	0	0	4	162	5th	1st
2025	Tatuus F4-T421	(Ukraine) Oleksandr Bondarev	20	1	1	2	2	89	10th	1st
2025	Tatuus F4-T421	(Latvia) Tomass Štolcermanis	6	0	0	0	1	60	11th	1st
2025	Tatuus F4-T421	(Italy) Andrea Dupé (Note: Andrea Dupé raced for PHM Racing for 9 races in 2025.)†	17	0	0	0	0	20	22nd	1st
2026	Tatuus F4-T421	(Romania) David Cosma Cristofor	12	0	2	0	7	233*	2nd*	2nd*
2026	Tatuus F4-T421	(Turkey) Alp Aksoy	12	2	2	1	5	214*	3rd*	2nd*
2026	Tatuus F4-T421	(Italy) Niccolò Maccagnani	11	2	1	0	4	166*	6th*	2nd*
2026	Tatuus F4-T421	(Ukraine) Oleksandr Bondarev	12	0	0	0	2	135*	9th*	2nd*
2026	Tatuus F4-T421	(Spain) Christian Costoya	11	0	0	0	0	80*	18th*	2nd*
2026	Tatuus F4-T421	(United Kingdom) Roman Kamyab	8	0	0	0	0	22*	26th*	2nd*
2026	Tatuus F4-T421	(China) Kingsley Zheng	11	0	0	0	0	20*	30th*	2nd*
2026	Tatuus F4-T421	(Bulgaria) Lyuboslav Ruykov								2nd*
2026	Tatuus F4-T421	(Switzerland) Georgiy Zasov								2nd*
2026	Tatuus F4-T421	(Italy) Ginevra Panzeri								2nd*

* Season still in progress.

† Dupé drove for PHM Racing until round 3.

=== Euro 4 Championship ===
Euro 4 Championship
Year	Car	Drivers	Races	Wins	Poles	F. Laps	Podiums	Points	D.C.	T.C.
2023	Tatuus F4-T421	(United States) Ugo Ugochukwu	9	3	1	2	5	193	1st	1st
2023	Tatuus F4-T421	(Australia) James Wharton	9	2	1	1	5	169	2nd	1st
2023	Tatuus F4-T421	(United Kingdom) Arvid Lindblad	9	1	1	2	4	124	4th	1st
2023	Tatuus F4-T421	(Finland) Tuukka Taponen	9	0	0	0	2	102	5th	1st
2023	Tatuus F4-T421	(Italy) Nicola Lacorte	9	0	0	0	0	57.5	9th	1st
2023	Tatuus F4-T421	(United Kingdom) Freddie Slater	6	0	1	0	0	30	10th	1st
2023	Tatuus F4-T421	(United Arab Emirates) Rashid Al Dhaheri	9	0	0	0	0	27	12th	1st
2023	Tatuus F4-T421	(Brazil) Aurelia Nobels	8	0	0	0	0	0	22nd	1st
2024	Tatuus F4-T421	(United Kingdom) Freddie Slater	9	2	2	1	4	106	2nd	1st
2024	Tatuus F4-T421	(United Kingdom) Kean Nakamura-Berta	9	1	1	1	3	97	3rd	1st
2024	Tatuus F4-T421	(Latvia) Tomass Štolcermanis	9	0	1	0	2	83	5th	1st
2024	Tatuus F4-T421	(United States) Alex Powell	9	1	0	1	1	49	9th	1st
2024	Tatuus F4-T421	(United Arab Emirates) Rashid Al Dhaheri	6	0	0	0	2	35	11th	1st
2024	Tatuus F4-T421	(United Kingdom) Dion Gowda	9	0	0	1	0	16	14th	1st
2025	Tatuus F4-T421	(Japan) Kean Nakamura-Berta	9	4	7	1	8	181	1st	1st
2025	Tatuus F4-T421	(United States) Sebastian Wheldon	9	1	0	3	3	88	4th	1st
2025	Tatuus F4-T421	(Colombia) Salim Hanna	9	0	0	0	1	55	7th	1st
2025	Tatuus F4-T421	(Ukraine) Oleksandr Bondarev	9	0	0	0	0	30	9th	1st
2025	Tatuus F4-T421	(Italy) Zhenrui Chi	9	0	0	0	0	19	12th	1st
2025	Tatuus F4-T421	(Canada) Lucas Nanji	3	0	0	0	0	0	28th	1st
2025	Tatuus F4-T421	(Italy) Andrea Dupé	6	0	0	0	0	0	31st	1st

=== F1 Academy ===
Year	Car	Drivers	Races	Wins	Poles	F. Laps	Podiums	Points	D.C.	T.C.
2023	Tatuus F4-T421	(Spain) Marta García	21	7	5	6	12	278	1st	1st
2023	Tatuus F4-T421	(Philippines) Bianca Bustamante	21	2	1	0	4	116	7th	1st
2023	Tatuus F4-T421	(United Kingdom) Chloe Chong	21	0	0	1	0	25	14th	1st
2024	Tatuus F4-T421	(France) Doriane Pin	14	3	5	4	8	217	2nd	1st
2024	Tatuus F4-T421	(Netherlands) Maya Weug	14	1	0	1	8	177	3rd	1st
2024	Tatuus F4-T421	(Switzerland) Tina Hausmann	14	0	0	0	0	31	10th	1st
2024	Tatuus F4-T421	(Netherlands) Nina Gademan	2	0	0	0	0	13	16th	1st
2024	Tatuus F4-T421	(United Kingdom) Alisha Palmowski	1	0	0	0	0	10	17th	1st
2024	Tatuus F4-T421	(United Kingdom) Ella Lloyd	2	0	0	0	0	8	18th	1st
2024	Tatuus F4-T421	(United Arab Emirates) Logan Hannah	3	0	0	0	0	1	19th	1st
2024	Tatuus F4-T421	(United States) Courtney Crone	2	0	0	0	0	0	20th	1st
2024	Tatuus F4-T421	(Saudi Arabia) Reema Juffali	2	0	0	0	0	0	21st	1st
2025	Tatuus F4-T421	(France) Doriane Pin	14	4	0	7	8	172	1st	1st
2025	Tatuus F4-T421	(Netherlands) Nina Gademan	14	1	0	0	4	74	6th	1st
2025	Tatuus F4-T421	(Switzerland) Tina Hausmann	13	0	0	0	0	50	8th	1st
2026	Tatuus F4-T421	(Germany) Mathilda Paatz								
2026	Tatuus F4-T421	(United States) Payton Westcott								
2026	Tatuus F4-T421	(Spain) Natalia Granada								

*Season still in progress.

=== Formula Trophy UAE ===
Year	Car	Drivers	Races	Wins	Poles	F. Laps	Podiums	Points	D.C.	T.C.
2024	Tatuus F4-T421	(United Arab Emirates) Rashid Al Dhaheri	5	2	4	4	4	96	2nd	1st
2024	Tatuus F4-T421	(China) Zhenrui Chi	7	0	1	0	2	54	5th	1st
2024	Tatuus F4-T421	(Colombia) Salim Hanna	7	0	0	0	0	40	7th	1st
2024	Tatuus F4-T421	(United States) Sebastian Wheldon	2	1	1	1	1	37	9th	1st
2025	Tatuus F4-T421	(Turkey) Alp Aksoy	7	2	3	2	4	105	1st	1st
2025	Tatuus F4-T421	(Ukraine) Oleksandr Bondarev	2	2	2	2	2	50	8th	1st
2025	Tatuus F4-T421	(United States) Payton Westcott	5	1	0	0	1	30	10th	1st
2025	Tatuus F4-T421	(Brazil) Bernardo Bernoldi	7	0	0	0	0	0	23rd	1st

=== Formula 4 UAE Championship / F4 Middle East Championship / UAE4 Series ===
Year	Car	Drivers	Races	Wins	Poles	Fast laps	Podiums	Points	D.C.	T.C.
2016–17	Tatuus F4-T014	(United Arab Emirates) Amna Al Qubaisi	0	0	0	0	0	0	NC	NC (Note: Entered as Abu Dhabi Racing)
2020	Tatuus F4-T014	(United Arab Emirates) Hamda Al Qubaisi	19	3	7	6	12	258	4th	3rd
2021	Tatuus F4-T014	(United Arab Emirates) Hamda Al Qubaisi	19	3	1	2	7	221	4th	3rd
2022	Tatuus F4-T421	(Austria) Charlie Wurz	20	2	3	2	10	255	1st	1st
2022	Tatuus F4-T421	(Brazil) Rafael Câmara	16	6	4	5	8	210	2nd	1st
2022	Tatuus F4-T421	(Italy) Andrea Kimi Antonelli	8	2	1	3	5	117	8th	1st
2022	Tatuus F4-T421	(United Kingdom) Aiden Neate	20	0	0	2	9	199	3rd	2nd
2022	Tatuus F4-T421	(Australia) James Wharton	16	4	3	4	5	168	5th	2nd
2022	Tatuus F4-T421	(Italy) Andrea Kimi Antonelli	8	2	1	3	5	117	8th	2nd
2022	Tatuus F4-T421	(Denmark) Conrad Laursen	8	0	0	0	2	56	12th	2nd
2023	Tatuus F4-T421	(United States) Ugo Ugochukwu	15	5	2	4	8	185	3rd	3rd
2023	Tatuus F4-T421	(Italy) Nicola Lacorte	15	0	0	0	0	5	24th	3rd
2023	Tatuus F4-T421	(Philippines) Bianca Bustamante	15	0	0	0	0	3	27th	3rd
2023	Tatuus F4-T421	(Australia) James Wharton	15	4	4	5	11	232	1st	1st (Note: Entered as Mumbai Falcons Racing Limited)
2023	Tatuus F4-T421	(Finland) Tuukka Taponen	15	4	2	2	10	212	2nd	1st
2023	Tatuus F4-T421	(India) Muhammad Ibrahim	9	0	0	0	0	4	26th	1st
2023	Tatuus F4-T421	(India) Rishon Rajeev	6	0	0	0	0	0	35th	1st
2024	Tatuus F4-T421	(United Arab Emirates) Rashid Al Dhaheri	15	2	1	0	5	153	4th	2nd
2024	Tatuus F4-T421	(France) Doriane Pin	12	1	1	1	1	66	10th	2nd
2024	Tatuus F4-T421	(Latvia) Tomass Štolcermanis	6	0	0	0	1	19	18th	2nd
2024	Tatuus F4-T421	(United Kingdom) Freddie Slater	15	2	0	4	6	172	1st	1st
2024	Tatuus F4-T421	(United Kingdom) Kean Nakamura-Berta	15	2	2	3	7	168	2nd	1st
2024	Tatuus F4-T421	(United States) Alex Powell	14	1	1	1	4	105	6th	1st
2024	Tatuus F4-T421	(United Kingdom) Dion Gowda	15	0	0	0	1	65	11th	1st
2025	Tatuus F4-T421	(United States) Sebastian Wheldon	15	0	0	0	1	90	7th	5th
2025	Tatuus F4-T421	(Italy) Zhenrui Chi	15	0	0	0	0	78	9th	5th
2025	Tatuus F4-T421	(Ukraine) Oleksandr Bondarev	15	0	0	0	0	54	12th	5th
2025	Tatuus F4-T421	(United Kingdom) Kean Nakamura-Berta	15	1	0	2	10	273	3rd	2nd
2025	Tatuus F4-T421	(Latvia) Tomass Štolcermanis	15	1	0	1	5	212	4th	2nd
2025	Tatuus F4-T421	(Colombia) Salim Hanna	15	0	0	0	1	112	6th	2nd
2025	Tatuus F4-T421	(India) Arjun Chheda	15	0	0	0	0	7	16th	2nd
2026	Tatuus F4-T421	(Romania) David Cosma Cristofor	15	0	0	0	2	97	5th	3rd
2026	Tatuus F4-T421	(Spain) Christian Costoya	15	1	0	1	2	86	6th	3rd
2026	Tatuus F4-T421	(United States) Payton Westcott	9	0	0	0	0	6	21st	3rd
2026	Tatuus F4-T421	(Ukraine) Oleksandr Bondarev	15	4	2	4	7	191	1st	2nd
2026	Tatuus F4-T421	(Italy) Niccolò Maccagnani	15	2	0	0	3	98	4th	2nd
2026	Tatuus F4-T421	(Turkey) Alp Aksoy	15	0	0	0	1	70	8th	2nd
2026	Tatuus F4-T421	(Italy) Kingsley Zheng	9	0	0	0	0	13	19th	2nd

† Antonelli competed under the Prema Racing banner in Round 1 and under the Abu Dhabi Racing by Prema banner in Round 3.

=== GB3 Championship ===
Year	Car	Drivers	Races	Wins	Poles	F. Laps	Podiums	Points	D.C.	T.C.
2025	Tatuus-Cosworth MSV-025	(United Kingdom) Reza Seewooruthun	24	1	1	2	5	315	5th	6th
2025	Tatuus-Cosworth MSV-025	(Spain) Lucas Fluxá †	24	1	0	0	1	258	8th	6th
2025	Tatuus-Cosworth MSV-025	(China) Yuanpu Cui †	15	0	0	0	0	122	18th	6th
2025	Tatuus-Cosworth MSV-025	(Sweden) August Raber	6	0	0	0	0	24	30th	6th

*Season still in progress.

† Cui and Fluxá also drove for Hillspeed.

== Former series results ==
=== IndyCar Series ===
(key)

Year	Chassis	Engine	Drivers	No.	1	2	3	4	5	6	7	8	9	10	11	12	13	14	15	16	17	Pos.	Pts.
2025					STP	THE	LBH	BAR	IGP	INDY	DET	GTW	ROA	MOH	IOW		TOR	LAG	POR	MIL	NSH		
2025	Dallara DW12	Chevrolet IndyCar V6t	(Israel) Robert Shwartzman R	83	20	22	18	25	18	**26**	16	10	27	21	20	9	16	21	15	18	14	24th	**211**
2025	Dallara DW12	Chevrolet IndyCar V6t	(United Kingdom) Callum Ilott	90	19	26	21	23	22	33	26	18^{L}	15	13	23	21	8	6	6	25	9	21st	**218**

=== International Formula 3000 ===
International Formula 3000
Year	Car	Drivers	Races	Wins	Poles	Fast laps	Points	D.C.	T.C.
1998	Lola T96/50-Zytek Judd	(Portugal) André Couto	12	0	0	0	7	11th	N/A
1998	Lola T96/50-Zytek Judd	(Italy) Paolo Ruberti	6	0	0	0	0	39th	N/A
1998	Lola T96/50-Zytek Judd	(Italy) Thomas Biagi	6 (8)	0	0	0	0 (3)	15th	N/A

=== Eurocup Formula Renault ===
Formula Renault 2000 Eurocup
Year	Car	Drivers	Races	Wins	Poles	Fast laps	Points	D.C.	T.C.
2001	Tatuus Renault 2000	(Australia) Ryan Briscoe	6	2	1	2	102	4th	1st
2001	Tatuus Renault 2000	(Portugal) César Campaniço	8	0	1	2	122	**3rd**	1st
2002	Tatuus Renault 2000	(France) Franck Perera	7	0	0	0	24	13th	9th
2002	Tatuus Renault 2000	(Sweden) Alexander Storckenfeldt	7	0	0	0	0	NC	9th
2003	Tatuus Renault 2000	(Brazil) Roberto Streit	8	0	0	0	44	9th	5th
2003	Tatuus Renault 2000	(France) Franck Perera	8	0	1	0	40	10th	5th
2003	Tatuus Renault 2000	(Japan) Kohei Hirate	8	0	0	0	8	21st	5th

=== Formula 3 Euro Series ===
Formula 3 Euro Series
Year	Car	Drivers	Wins	Poles	F.Laps	Points	D.C.	T.C.
2003	Dallara F303-Mercedes HWA	(Australia) Ryan Briscoe	8	5	5	110	**1st**	**3rd**
2003	Dallara F303-Mercedes HWA	(Poland) Robert Kubica	1	1	1	31	12th	**3rd**
2003	Dallara F303-Mercedes HWA	(Brazil) Lucas di Grassi	0	0	0	5	21st	**3rd**
2003	Dallara F303-Mercedes HWA	(Japan) Katsuyuki Hiranaka	0	0	0	4	22nd	**3rd**
2004	Dallara F303-Mercedes HWA	(France) Franck Perera	0	0	0	48	8th	**3rd**
2004	Dallara F303-Mercedes HWA	(Brazil) Roberto Streit	0	0	0	28	10th	**3rd**
2004	Dallara F303-Mercedes HWA	(Japan) Katsuyuki Hiranaka	0	0	0	9	15th	**3rd**
2004	Dallara F303-Mercedes HWA	(Japan) Kohei Hirate	0	0	0	0	28th	**3rd**
2005	Dallara F305-Mercedes HWA	(France) Franck Perera	0	0	0	67	4th	**3rd**
2005	Dallara F305-Mercedes HWA	(Italy) Marco Bonanomi	0	0	0	21	11th	**3rd**
2005	Dallara F305-Mercedes HWA	(Belgium) Gregory Franchi	0	0	0	11	17th	**3rd**
2006	Dallara F306-Mercedes HWA	(Brazil) Roberto Streit	0	0	0	4	17th	9th
2006	Dallara F306-Mercedes HWA	(Portugal) João Urbano	0	0	0	1	19th	9th
2006	Dallara F306-Mercedes HWA	(Spain) Alejandro Nuñez	0	0	0	0	NC	9th
2006	Dallara F306-Mercedes HWA	(Italy) Paolo Maria Nocera	0	0	0	0	NC	9th
2006	Dallara F305-Mercedes HWA	(Republic of Ireland) Ronayne O'Mahony	0	0	0	0	NC	9th
2007	Dallara F306-Mercedes HWA	(Netherlands) Renger van der Zande	1	0	0	59	4th	5th
2007	Dallara F306-Mercedes HWA	(Australia) Michael Patrizi	0	0	0	1	18th	5th
2008	Dallara F308-Mercedes HWA	(Netherlands) Renger van der Zande	2	0	0	85	4th	4th
2008	Dallara F308-Mercedes HWA	(Spain) Dani Clos	0	0	0	16.5	14th	4th
2008	Dallara F308-Mercedes HWA	(United States) Charlie Kimball	0	0	0	8	17th	4th
2008	Dallara F308-Mercedes HWA	(Monaco) Stefano Coletti	1	0	2	6.5	20th	4th
2009	Dallara F308-Mercedes HWA	(Monaco) Stefano Coletti	1	0	1	19	10th	5th
2009	Dallara F308-Mercedes HWA	(Lebanon) Basil Shaaban	0	0	0	6	16th	5th
2009	Dallara F308-Mercedes HWA	(Italy) Matteo Chinosi	0	0	0	0	NC	5th
2009	Dallara F308-Mercedes HWA	(Germany) Tim Sandtler	0	0	0	0	NC	5th
2010	Dallara F309-Mercedes HWA	(Spain) Daniel Juncadella	1	1	3	35	8th	5th
2010	Dallara F308-Mercedes HWA	(France) Nicolas Marroc	0	0	0	10	11th	5th
2011	Dallara F308-Mercedes HWA	(Spain) Roberto Merhi	11	8	10	406	**1st**	**1st**
2011	Dallara F308-Mercedes HWA	(Canada) Gianmarco Raimondo	1	1	3	66	11th	**1st**
2011	Dallara F309-Mercedes HWA	(Spain) Daniel Juncadella	4	4	3	280	**3rd**	**1st**
2012	Dallara F312-Mercedes HWA	(Spain) Daniel Juncadella	5	5	6	240	**1st**	**1st**
2012	Dallara F312-Mercedes HWA	(Italy) Raffaele Marciello	6	2	6	219.5	**3rd**	**1st**
2012	Dallara F312-Mercedes HWA	(Germany) Sven Müller	1	2	1	172	6th	**1st**
2012	Dallara F312-Mercedes HWA	(United States) Michael Lewis	1	0	1	127	8th	**1st**

=== Eurocup Formula Renault 2.0 ===
Eurocup Formula Renault 2.0
Year	Car	Drivers	Races	Wins	Poles	F/laps	Points	D.C.	T.C.
2005	Tatuus Renault 2000	(Japan) Kamui Kobayashi	16	6	4	5	157	1st	3rd
2005	Tatuus Renault 2000	(Brazil) Patrick Rocha	16	0	0	1	26	13th	3rd
2005	Tatuus Renault 2000	(France) Tom Dillmann	10	0	0	0	0	NC	3rd
2005	Tatuus Renault 2000	(Romania) Mihai Marinescu	4	0	0	0	0	NC	3rd
2006	Tatuus Renault 2000	(Netherlands) Henkie Waldschmidt	14	0	0	0	19	15th	10th
2006	Tatuus Renault 2000	(Italy) Edoardo Mortara	14	0	0	0	8	22nd	10th
2006	Tatuus Renault 2000	(United Kingdom) Martin Plowman	14	0	0	0	7	23rd	10th
2007	Tatuus Renault 2000	(Netherlands) Henkie Waldschmidt	14	1	0	0	7	7th	5th
2007	Tatuus Renault 2000	(Italy) Andrea Caldarelli	14	0	0	0	2	24th	5th
2007	Tatuus Renault 2000	(United Kingdom) Martin Plowman	14	0	0	0	1	26th	5th
2008	Tatuus Renault 2000	(Italy) Sergio Campana	12	0	0	0	0	25th	9th
2008	Tatuus Renault 2000	(Italy) Patrick Reiterer	14	0	0	0	2	27th	9th
2008	Tatuus Renault 2000	(Lithuania) Kazimieras Vasiliauskas	10	0	0	0	0	NC	9th
2008	Tatuus Renault 2000	(Colombia) Carlos Muñoz	2	0	0	0	0	NC	9th
2008	Tatuus Renault 2000	(Spain) Victor Garcia	2	0	0	0	0	NC	9th
2013	Barazi-Epsilon FR2.0–10	(Italy) Luca Ghiotto	14	1	1	1	69	9th	7th
2013	Barazi-Epsilon FR2.0–10	(Brazil) Bruno Bonifacio	14	0	0	2	29	15th	7th
2013	Barazi-Epsilon FR2.0–10	(Italy) Antonio Fuoco	2	0	1	0	0	NC	7th
2013	Barazi-Epsilon FR2.0–10	(France) Aurélien Panis	8	0	0	0	0	NC	7th
2014	Tatuus FR2.0–13	(Norway) Dennis Olsen	14	2	2	3	124	2nd	**2nd**
2014	Tatuus FR2.0–13	(Brazil) Bruno Bonifacio	14	1	0	0	88	5th	**2nd**
2014	Tatuus FR2.0–13	(Estonia) Hans Villemi	14	0	0	0	38	14th	**2nd**
2014	Tatuus FR2.0–13	(Poland) Alex Bosak	2	0	0	0	0	NC	**2nd**

=== Formula Renault 3.5 Series ===
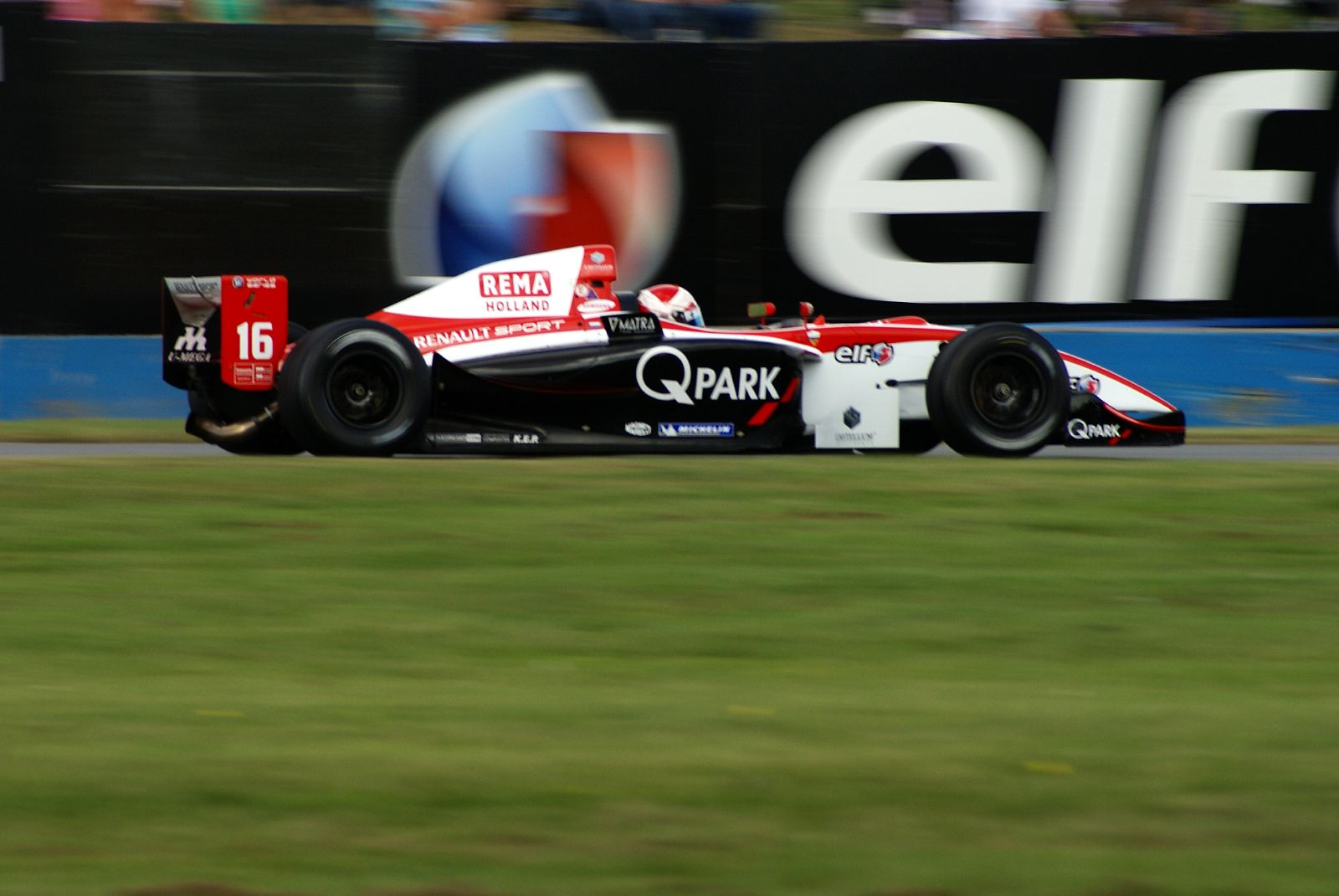
Xavier Maassen driving for Prema Powerteam at the Donington Park round of the 2007 World Series by Renault season.

Formula Renault 3.5 Series results
Year	Car	Drivers	Races	Wins	Poles	Fast laps	Points	D.C.	T.C.
2006	Dallara T05-Renault	(San Marino) Christian Montanari	17	1	2	1	58	7th	8th
2006	Dallara T05-Renault	(Belgium) Gregory Franchi	17	0	0	0	10	25th	8th
2007	Dallara T05-Renault	(United Kingdom) Ben Hanley	17	2	0	3	102	2nd	5th
2007	Dallara T05-Renault	(Netherlands) Xavier Maassen	17	1	1	0	0	32nd	5th
2008	Dallara T08-Renault	(Spain) Miguel Molina	17	2	1	0	79	4th	4th
2008	Dallara T08-Renault	(Spain) Álvaro Barba	17	0	0	0	58	10th	4th
2009	Dallara T08-Renault	(Colombia) Julián Leal	17	0	0	0	11	20th	13th
2009	Dallara T08-Renault	(Czech Republic) Filip Salaquarda	13	0	0	0	1	27th	13th
2009	Dallara T08-Renault	(Monaco) Stefano Coletti	1	0	0	0	1	28th	13th
2009	Dallara T08-Renault	(Italy) Francesco Provenzano	4	0	0	0	0	31st	13th

=== Formula Renault 2.0 Alps ===
Formula Renault 2.0 Alps
Year	Car	Drivers	Races	Wins	Poles	Fast laps	Points	D.C.	T.C.
2012	Barazi-Epsilon FR2.0–10	(Italy) Luca Ghiotto	4	0	0	0	22	19th	7th
2012	Barazi-Epsilon FR2.0–10	(Brazil) Bruno Bonifacio	4	0	0	0	16	20th	7th
2013	Barazi-Epsilon FR2.0–10	(Italy) Luca Ghiotto	14	5	2	6	210	**2nd**	**2nd**
2013	Barazi-Epsilon FR2.0–10	(Brazil) Bruno Bonifacio	14	3	6	2	145	**3rd**	**2nd**
2014	Tatuus FR2.0–13	(Poland) Alex Bosak	14	0	0	0	37	11th	8th
2014	Tatuus FR2.0–13	(Singapore) Andrew Tang	2	0	0	0	24	17th	8th
2014	Tatuus FR2.0–13	(Brazil) Bruno Bonifacio	6	1	1	1	0	NC	8th
2014	Tatuus FR2.0–13	(Estonia) Hans Villemi	4	0	0	0	0	NC	8th
2014	Tatuus FR2.0–13	(Norway) Dennis Olsen	6	0	0	0	0	NC	8th

=== Italian Formula Three Championship ===
Italian Formula Three Championship
Year	Car	Drivers	Races	Wins	Poles	Fast laps	Points	D.C.	T.C.
2002	Dallara F302-Spiess-Opel	(Portugal) César Campaniço	1	0	0	0	3	12th	6th
2002	Dallara F302-Spiess-Opel	(Australia) Ryan Briscoe	1	0	0	0	0	NC	6th
2002	Dallara F302-Spiess-Opel	(Japan) Kosuke Matsuura	1	0	0	0	6	9th	6th
2009	Dallara F308-FPT Fiat	(Italy) Francesco Castellacci	16	0	0	0	64	8th	**2nd**
2009	Dallara F308-FPT Fiat	(Spain) Daniel Campos-Hull	16	2	2	5	148	5th	**2nd**
2010	Dallara F308-FPT Fiat	(Italy) Samuele Buttarelli	10	0	0	1	50	8th	**2nd**
2010	Dallara F308-FPT Fiat	(France) Nicolas Marroc	6	0	0	0	30	12th	**2nd**
2010	Dallara F308-FPT Fiat	(Italy) Edoardo Liberati	16	0	0	1	44	9th	**2nd**
2010	Dallara F308-FPT Fiat	(Italy) Andrea Caldarelli	16	3	2	3	148	**3rd**	**2nd**
2011	Dallara F308-FPT Fiat	(United States) Michael Lewis	16	3	2	3	136	**2nd**	**2nd**
2011	Dallara F308-FPT Fiat	(Italy) Andrea Roda	16	0	0	0	20	12th	**2nd**
2011	Dallara F308-FPT Fiat	(Italy) Raffaele Marciello	16	2	1	2	123	**3rd**	**2nd**
2012	Dallara F308-FPT Fiat	(Italy) Eddie Cheever III	24	4	8	5	248	**2nd**	**1st**
2012	Dallara F308-FPT Fiat	(France) Brandon Maïsano	24	3	2	3	229	**3rd**	**1st**
2012	Dallara F308-FPT Fiat	(Brazil) Henrique Martins	24	3	0	3	180	4th	**1st**

=== GP2 Series ===
Year	Car	Drivers	Races	Wins	Poles	F.L.	Podiums	Points	D.C.	T.C.
2016	Dallara GP2/11-Mecachrome	(France) Pierre Gasly	22	4	5	3	9	219	**1st**	**1st**
2016	Dallara GP2/11-Mecachrome	(Italy) Antonio Giovinazzi	22	5	2	4	8	211	**2nd**	**1st**

==== In detail ====
(key) (Races in bold indicate pole position) (Races in italics indicate fastest lap)

Year	Chassis Engine Tyres	Drivers	1	2	3	4	5	6	7	8	9	10	11	12	13	14	15	16	17	18	19	20	21	22	T.C.	Points
2016	GP2/11; Mecachrome; **P**		CAT; FEA	CAT; SPR	MON; FEA	MON; SPR	BAK; FEA	BAK; SPR	RBR; FEA	RBR; SPR	SIL; FEA	SIL; SPR	HUN; FEA	HUN; SPR	HOC; FEA	HOC; SPR	SPA; FEA	SPA; SPR	MNZ; FEA	MNZ; SPR	SEP; FEA	SEP; SPR	YMC; FEA	YMC; SPR	1st	430
2016	GP2/11; Mecachrome; **P**	(Italy) Antonio Giovinazzi	18	Ret	11	18	**1**	1	Ret	5	2	4	2	17^{†}	8	Ret	**6**	1	1	3	1	4	5	6	1st	430
2016	GP2/11; Mecachrome; **P**	(France) Pierre Gasly	**3**	2	15	13	Ret	2	Ret	7	1	7	**1**	7	DSQ	6	1	4	**4**	2	**11**	3	**1**	9	1st	430

=== FIA European Formula 3 Championship ===
FIA Formula 3 European Championship
Year	Car	Drivers	Wins	Poles	F.Laps	Podiums	Points	D.C.	T.C.
2012	Dallara F312-Mercedes HWA	(Spain) Daniel Juncadella	5	5	5	10	252	**1st**	N/A
2012	Dallara F312-Mercedes HWA	(Italy) Raffaele Marciello	7	4	6	9	228.5	**2nd**	N/A
2012	Dallara F312-Mercedes HWA	(Germany) Sven Müller	0	4	2	3	109	8th	N/A
2012	Dallara F312-Mercedes HWA	(United States) Michael Lewis	0	0	2	3	101	9th	N/A
2013	Dallara F312-Mercedes HWA	(Italy) Raffaele Marciello	13	12	8	19	489.5	**1st**	**1st**
2013	Dallara F312-Mercedes HWA	(United Kingdom) Alex Lynn	3	5	4	14	339.5	**3rd**	**1st**
2013	Dallara F312-Mercedes HWA	(Austria) Lucas Auer	1	0	2	9	227	4th	**1st**
2013	Dallara F312-Mercedes HWA	(Italy) Eddie Cheever III	0	0	0	0	50	13th	**1st**
2014	Dallara F314-Mercedes HWA	(France) Esteban Ocon	9	15	7	21	478	**1st**	**1st**
2014	Dallara F314-Mercedes HWA	(Canada) Nicholas Latifi	0	0	0	1	128	10th	**1st**
2014	Dallara F312-Mercedes HWA	(Italy) Antonio Fuoco	2	0	2	10	255	5th	**1st**
2014	Dallara F312-Mercedes HWA	(Netherlands) Dennis van de Laar	0	0	0	0	38	14th	**1st**
2015	Dallara F315-Mercedes HWA	(Sweden) Felix Rosenqvist	13	16	13	24	518	**1st**	**1st**
2015	Dallara F315-Mercedes HWA	(United Kingdom) Jake Dennis	6	5	5	16	377	**3rd**	**1st**
2015	Dallara F312-Mercedes HWA	(Canada) Lance Stroll	1	0	0	6	231	5th	**1st**
2015	Dallara F312-Mercedes HWA	(Germany) Maximilian Günther	0	0	0	2	152	8th	**1st**
2015	Dallara F312-Mercedes HWA	(France) Brandon Maïsano	0	0	0	0	53	15th	**1st**
2015	Dallara F312-Mercedes HWA	(New Zealand) Nick Cassidy	0	0	0	2	43	16th	**1st**
2016	Dallara F316-Mercedes HWA	(Canada) Lance Stroll	11	12	11	20	432	**1st**	**1st**
2016	Dallara F315-Mercedes HWA	(Germany) Maximilian Günther	4	7	4	13	296	**2nd**	**1st**
2016	Dallara F315-Mercedes HWA	(Estonia) Ralf Aron	1	0	0	2	138	8th	**1st**
2016	Dallara F314-Mercedes HWA	(New Zealand) Nick Cassidy	1	1	1	8	227	4th	**1st**
2017	Dallara F316-Mercedes HWA	(Germany) Maximilian Günther	5	3	2	16	383	**3rd**	**1st**
2017	Dallara F314-Mercedes HWA	(United Kingdom) Callum Ilott	6	10	9	11	344	4th	**1st**
2017	Dallara F315-Mercedes HWA	(China) Guanyu Zhou	0	0	0	5	149	8th	**1st**
2017	Dallara F317-Mercedes HWA	(Germany) Mick Schumacher	0	0	0	1	94	12th	**1st**
2018	Dallara F318-Mercedes HWA	(Germany) Mick Schumacher	8	7	3	14	365	**1st**	**1st**
2018	Dallara F314-Mercedes HWA	(Russia) Robert Shwartzman	2	3	1	11	308	**3rd**	**1st**
2018	Dallara F317-Mercedes HWA	(New Zealand) Marcus Armstrong	3	1	3	9	260	5th	**1st**
2018	Dallara F317-Mercedes HWA	(Estonia) Ralf Aron	0	4	2	8	242.5	6th	**1st**
2018	Dallara F315-Mercedes HWA	(China) Guanyu Zhou	3	2	1	6	203	8th	**1st**

=== ADAC Formula 4 ===
Year	Car	Drivers	Races	Wins	Poles	Fast laps	Points	D.C.	T.C.
2015	Tatuus F4-T014	(Estonia) Ralf Aron	12	1	0	2	120	9th	N/A
2015	Tatuus F4-T014	(China) Guanyu Zhou	9	0	0	0	45	15th	N/A
2015	Tatuus F4-T014	(Brazil) Giuliano Raucci	3	0	0	0	0	41st	N/A
2016	Tatuus F4-T014	(Germany) Mick Schumacher	24	5	4	2	322	**2nd**	**1st**
2016	Tatuus F4-T014	(Estonia) Jüri Vips	24	0	0	0	138	6th	**1st**
2016	Tatuus F4-T014	(United States) Juan Manuel Correa	24	0	0	2	91	10th	**1st**
2017	Tatuus F4-T014	(Estonia) Jüri Vips	21	2	0	0	245.5	**1st**	**1st**
2017	Tatuus F4-T014	(New Zealand) Marcus Armstrong	21	3	2	1	241	**2nd**	**1st**
2017	Tatuus F4-T014	(United States) Juan Manuel Correa	15	0	0	1	76	9th	**1st**
2017	Tatuus F4-T014	(Brazil) Enzo Fittipaldi	3	0	0	0	0	NC	**1st**
2018	Tatuus F4-T014	(Brazil) Enzo Fittipaldi	20	1	2	3	223	**3rd**	**3rd**
2018	Tatuus F4-T014	(United Kingdom) Olli Caldwell	20	1	0	0	125	7th	**3rd**
2018	Tatuus F4-T014	(Brazil) Gianluca Petecof	20	0	0	0	92	10th	**3rd**
2018	Tatuus F4-T014	(Australia) Jack Doohan	8	0	0	1	35	12th	**3rd**
2018	Tatuus F4-T014	(Brazil) Caio Collet	3	0	0	0	18	16th	**3rd**
2019	Tatuus F4-T014	(Brazil) Gianluca Petecof	20	1	2	3	164	5th	**3rd**
2019	Tatuus F4-T014	(Estonia) Paul Aron	20	2	0	0	129	7th	**3rd**
2019	Tatuus F4-T014	(Denmark) Oliver Rasmussen	20	0	0	0	76	12th	**3rd**
2019	Tatuus F4-T014	(Venezuela) Alessandro Famularo	11	1	0	0	49	15th	**3rd**
2020	Tatuus F4-T014	(Italy) Gabriele Minì	6	1	2	2	82	10th	5th
2020	Tatuus F4-T014	(Colombia) Sebastián Montoya	6	0	0	1	10	17th	5th
2020	Tatuus F4-T014	(Sweden) Dino Beganovic	6	0	0	0	12	16th	5th
2021	Tatuus F4-T014	(Colombia) Sebastián Montoya	6	0	0	2	72	9th	4th
2021	Tatuus F4-T014	(Russia) Kirill Smal	6	1	0	1	70	10th	4th
2021	Tatuus F4-T014	(Denmark) Conrad Laursen	6	0	0	0	2	20th	4th
2021	Tatuus F4-T014	(United Arab Emirates) Hamda Al Qubaisi	6	0	0	0	0	21st	4th
2022	Tatuus F4-T421	(Italy) Andrea Kimi Antonelli	15	9	7	8	313	**1st**	**1st**
2022	Tatuus F4-T421	(Brazil) Rafael Câmara	12	1	2	2	193	**3rd**	**1st**
2022	Tatuus F4-T421	(Australia) James Wharton	15	1	0	2	146	5th	**1st**
2022	Tatuus F4-T421	(Denmark) Conrad Laursen	12	1	0	1	129	6th	**1st**
2022	Tatuus F4-T421	(Austria) Charlie Wurz	12	0	0	0	111	7th	**1st**
2022	Tatuus F4-T421	(United States) Ugo Ugochukwu	6	0	0	0	0	NC†	**1st**

=== F3 Asian Championship/Formula Regional Asian Championship ===
Year	Car	Drivers	Races	Wins	Poles	Fast Laps	Points	D.C.	T.C.
2020	Tatuus F3 T-318-Alfa Romeo	(United Arab Emirates) Khaled Al Qubaisi	3	0	0	0	2	18th	7th
2021	Tatuus F3 T-318-Alfa Romeo	(China) Guanyu Zhou	15	4	5	5	257	**1st**	**1st**
2021	Tatuus F3 T-318-Alfa Romeo	(Sweden) Dino Beganovic	9	0	0	0	88	7th	**1st**
2021	Tatuus F3 T-318-Alfa Romeo	(Spain) David Vidales	6	0	0	0	38	13th	**1st**
2021	Tatuus F3 T-318-Alfa Romeo	(United Arab Emirates) Amna Al Qubaisi	15	0	0	0	0	25th	**1st**
2021	Tatuus F3 T-318-Alfa Romeo	(United Arab Emirates) Khaled Al Qubaisi	6	0	0	0	0	26th	**1st**
2021	Tatuus F3 T-318-Alfa Romeo	(India) Jehan Daruvala	15	3	3	3	192	**3rd**	**3rd**
2021	Tatuus F3 T-318-Alfa Romeo	(India) Kush Maini	15	0	0	2	55	11th	**3rd**
2022	Tatuus F3 T-318-Alfa Romeo	(United States) Jak Crawford	15	0	0	1	113	6th	4th
2022	Tatuus F3 T-318-Alfa Romeo	(Estonia) Paul Aron	15	0	2	1	80	8th	4th
2022	Tatuus F3 T-318-Alfa Romeo	(United Arab Emirates) Amna Al Qubaisi	14	0	0	0	1	26th	4th
2022	Tatuus F3 T-318-Alfa Romeo	(United Arab Emirates) Hamda Al Qubaisi	15	0	0	0	0	28th	4th
2022	Tatuus F3 T-318-Alfa Romeo	(United Arab Emirates) Khaled Al Qubaisi	15	0	0	0	0	35th	4th
2022	Tatuus F3 T-318-Alfa Romeo	(Monaco) Arthur Leclerc	15	4	1	1	218	**1st**	**1st**
2022	Tatuus F3 T-318-Alfa Romeo	(Sweden) Dino Beganovic	15	1	0	2	130	5th	**1st**
2022	Tatuus F3 T-318-Alfa Romeo	(Colombia) Sebastián Montoya	9	2	3	2	92	7th	**1st**
2022	Tatuus F3 T-318-Alfa Romeo	(United Kingdom) Oliver Bearman	6	0	0	0	29	15th	**1st**

=== 24 Hours of Le Mans ===
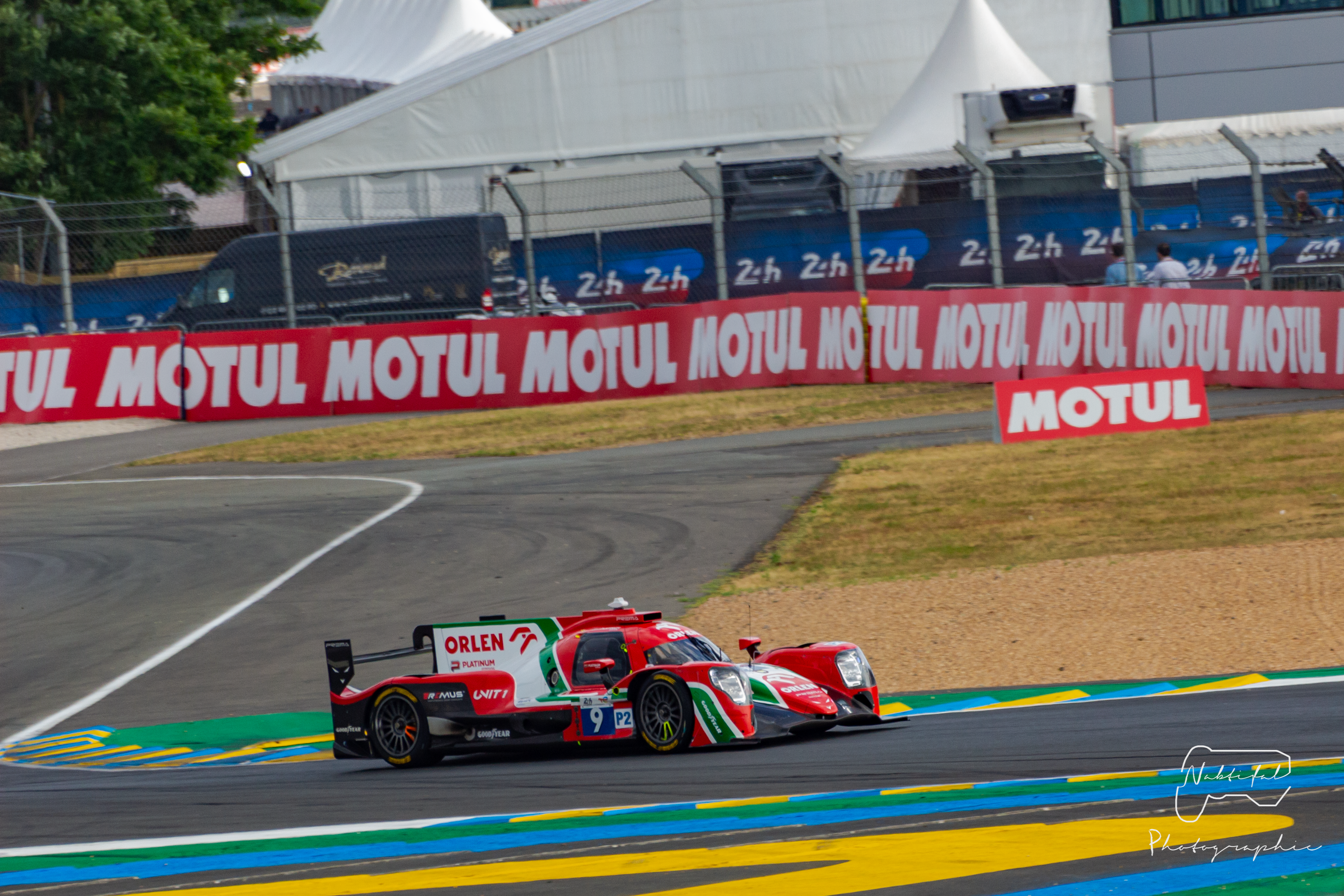
Prema Orlen Team Oreca 07 during the 2022 24 Hours of Le Mans

Year	Entrant	No.	Car	Drivers	Class	Laps	Pos.	Class Pos.
2022	(Italy) Prema Orlen Team	9	Oreca 07-Gibson	(Italy) Lorenzo Colombo (Switzerland) Louis Delétraz (Poland) Robert Kubica	LMP2	369	6th	**2nd**
2023	(Italy) Prema Racing	9	Oreca 07-Gibson	(United States) Juan Manuel Correa (Romania) Filip Ugran (Netherlands) Bent Viscaal	LMP2	310	34th	16th
2023	(Italy) Prema Racing	63	Oreca 07-Gibson	(Italy) Mirko Bortolotti; Daniil Kvyat (France) Doriane Pin	LMP2	113	DNF	DNF
2024	(Italy) Lamborghini Iron Lynx	19	Lamborghini SC63	(Italy) Matteo Cairoli (Italy) Andrea Caldarelli (France) Romain Grosjean	Hypercar	309	13th	13th
2024	(Italy) Lamborghini Iron Lynx	63	Lamborghini SC63	(Italy) Mirko Bortolotti; Daniil Kvyat (Italy) Edoardo Mortara	Hypercar	309	10th	10th

=== FIA World Endurance Championship ===
Year	Entrant	Class	No	Chassis	Engine	Drivers	1	2	3	4	5	6	7	8	Pos.	Pts
2022	(Italy) Prema Orlen Team	LMP2	9	Oreca 07	Gibson GK428 4.2L V8	(Italy) Lorenzo Colombo (Switzerland) Louis Delétraz (Poland) Robert Kubica	SEB; 4	SPA; 7	LMN; 2	MON; 6	FUJ; 6	BAH; 4			**5th**	**94**
2023	(Italy) Prema Racing	LMP2	9	Oreca 07	Gibson GK428 4.2L V8	(Romania) Filip Ugran (Netherlands) Bent Viscaal (Italy) Andrea Caldarelli (United States) Juan Manuel Correa	SEB; 7	POR; 5	SPA; 4	LMS; 16	MNZ; 9	FUJ; 8	BHR; 4		**9th**	**57**
2023	(Italy) Prema Racing	LMP2	63	Oreca 07	Gibson GK428 4.2L V8	(France) Doriane Pin (Italy) Mirko Bortolotti; Daniil Kvyat (Italy) Andrea Caldarelli (Switzerland) Mathias Beche	SEB; 2	POR; 4	SPA; 10	LMS; Ret	MNZ; 7	FUJ; 10	BHR; 5		**8th**	**63**
2024	(Italy) Lamborghini Iron Lynx	Hypercar	63	Lamborghini SC63	Lamborghini 3.8 L Turbo V8	(Italy) Mirko Bortolotti; Daniil Kvyat (Italy) Edoardo Mortara (Italy) Andrea Caldarelli	QAT; 13	IMO; 12	SPA; Ret	LMN; 10	SAP	COTA	FUJ	BHR	**8th**	**11**

=== European Le Mans Series ===
Year	Entrant	Class	No	Chassis	Engine	Drivers	1	2	3	4	5	6	Pos.	Pts
2022	(Italy) Prema Racing	LMP2	9	Oreca 07	Gibson GK428 4.2L V8	(United States) Juan Manuel Correa (Switzerland) Louis Delétraz (Austria) Ferdinand Habsburg (Italy) Lorenzo Colombo	LEC; 1	IMO; 1	MON; 5	CAT; 1	SPA; 3	ALG; 1	**1st**	**125**

=== Formula 4 South East Asia Championship ===
Year	Car	Drivers	Races	Wins	Poles	Fast laps	Points	D.C.	T.C.
2023	Tatuus F4-T421	(France) Doriane Pin	6	1	0	1	82	**2nd**	**3rd**
2023	Tatuus F4-T421	(United Kingdom) Kean Nakamura-Berta	6	0	2	2	48	6th	**3rd**
2023	Tatuus F4-T421	(Latvia) Tomass Štolcermanis	3	0	0	0	35	12th	**3rd**
2023	Tatuus F4-T421	(United Arab Emirates) Rashid Al Dhaheri	3	1	0	1	25	15th	**3rd**

== Timeline ==
Current series
Italian F4 Championship	2014–present
UAE4 Series	2016, 2020–present
FIA Formula 2 Championship	2017–present
FIA Formula 3 Championship	2019–present
Formula Regional European Championship	2019–present
Formula Regional Middle East Trophy	2023–present
F1 Academy	2023–present
Euro 4 Championship	2023–present
Karting	2023–present
Formula Trophy UAE	2024–present
Former series
Italian Formula Three Championship	1984–1999, 2002, 2009–2012
German Formula Three Championship	1996, 2000–2002
British Formula 3 International Series	1997, 1999, 2003, 2010–2012
International Formula 3000	1998
Italian Formula Renault Championship	2000–2008
French Formula Three Championship	2001–2002
Eurocup Formula Renault 2.0	2001–2003, 2005–2008, 2013–2014
Formula 3 Euro Series	2003–2012
Formula Renault 2000 Germany	2004
Formula Renault 3.5 Series	2006–2009
Formula Abarth	2010–2012
Formula Renault 2.0 Alps	2012–2014
FIA Formula 3 European Championship	2012–2018
ADAC Formula 4	2015–2022
GP2 Series	2016
European Le Mans Series	2022
Formula Regional Asian Championship	2020–2022
FIA World Endurance Championship	2022–2023
Formula 4 South East Asia Championship	2023
GB3 Championship	2025
IndyCar Series	2025

== Notes ==
Achievements
Preceded by JD Motorsport	Formula Renault 2000 Eurocup; 2001	Succeeded by Graff Racing
Preceded by Cram Competition	Formula Renault 2000 Italia Team's Champion; 2001	Succeeded by Cram Competition
Preceded by Cram Competition	Formula Renault 2000 Italia Team's Champion; 2003	Succeeded by Cram Competition
Preceded by Inaugural	Formula Abarth Teams' Champion; 2010	Succeeded by Jenzer Motorsport
Preceded by Signature Team	Formula 3 Euro Series Teams' Champion; 2011–2012	Succeeded by Folded
Preceded by Tech 1 Racing	Formula Renault 2.0 Alps Teams' Champion; 2012	Succeeded by Koiranen GP
Preceded by Inaugural	FIA Formula 3 European Teams' Champion; 2013–2018	Succeeded by Folded
Preceded by Inaugural	Italian F4 Teams' Champion; 2014–2016	Succeeded by Bhaitech
Preceded by ART Grand Prix	GP2 Series Teams' Champion; 2016	Succeeded by Russian Time (FIA Formula 2)
Preceded by Inaugural	ADAC Formula 4 Teams' Champion; 2016–2017	Succeeded by US Racing – CHRS
Preceded by Bhaitech	Italian F4 Teams' Champion; 2018	Succeeded by Van Amersfoort Racing
Preceded by Inaugural	FIA Formula 3 Teams' Champion; 2019–2020	Succeeded by Trident
Preceded by Inaugural	Formula Regional European Teams' Champion; 2019–2020	Succeeded by R-ace GP
Preceded by BlackArts Racing Team	F3 Asian Teams' Champion; 2021	Succeeded by Mumbai Falcons (Formula Regional Asian)
Preceded by Van Amersfoort Racing	Italian F4 Teams' Champion; 2020	Succeeded by Van Amersfoort Racing
Preceded by DAMS	FIA Formula 2 Teams' Champion; 2020–2021	Succeeded by MP Motorsport
Preceded by Van Amersfoort Racing	ADAC Formula 4 Teams' Champion; 2022	Folded
Preceded by Trident	FIA Formula 3 Teams' Champion; 2022-2024	Incumbent
Preceded by R-ace GP	Formula Regional European Teams' Champion; 2022–2024	Incumbent
Preceded by Van Amersfoort Racing	Italian F4 Teams' Champion; 2022–2024	Incumbent
