= Guillaume Le Goff =

Guillaume Le Goff (born 30 August 1984) is a French motorsport professional. He is the founder and director of The Grid Agency, a driver management and development company based in London.

== Early life and education ==
In 2007, Guillaume Le Goff graduated with a specialization in automotive engineering at École Supérieure des Techniques Aéronautiques et de Construction Automobile (ESTACA). Between 2015 and 2017, he earned a Master of Business Administration (MBA) from HEC Paris.

== Career ==
Le Goff began his career in motorsport as a race engineer at ART Grand Prix from 2006 to 2011, where he worked in junior single-seater categories. During his tenure, ART Grand Prix secured major team titles: the GP2 Series team championship in 2006 and the inaugural GP3 Series team championship in 2010. In January 2011, he co-founded AOTech, a company specializing in simulator and motorsport technologies, and from 2016 to 2017, held a position as a business unit manager in the automotive division of McLaren in the United Kingdom. In 2017, Le Goff established The Grid Agency, which provides driver management and support services. The agency's work includes contract negotiation, performance monitoring, and commercial development. The agency represents drivers across multiple racing categories, including Pierre Gasly, Nyck de Vries,, Andrea Dupé, Enzo Deligny, Kush Maini, Alessandro Giusti, and Frédéric Makowiecki. In September 2018, Le Goff became a co-founder and director of Soter Analytics Ltd. He served on the company's board from 2018 to 2023.
