= Andrea Dupé =

French racing driver (born 2008)

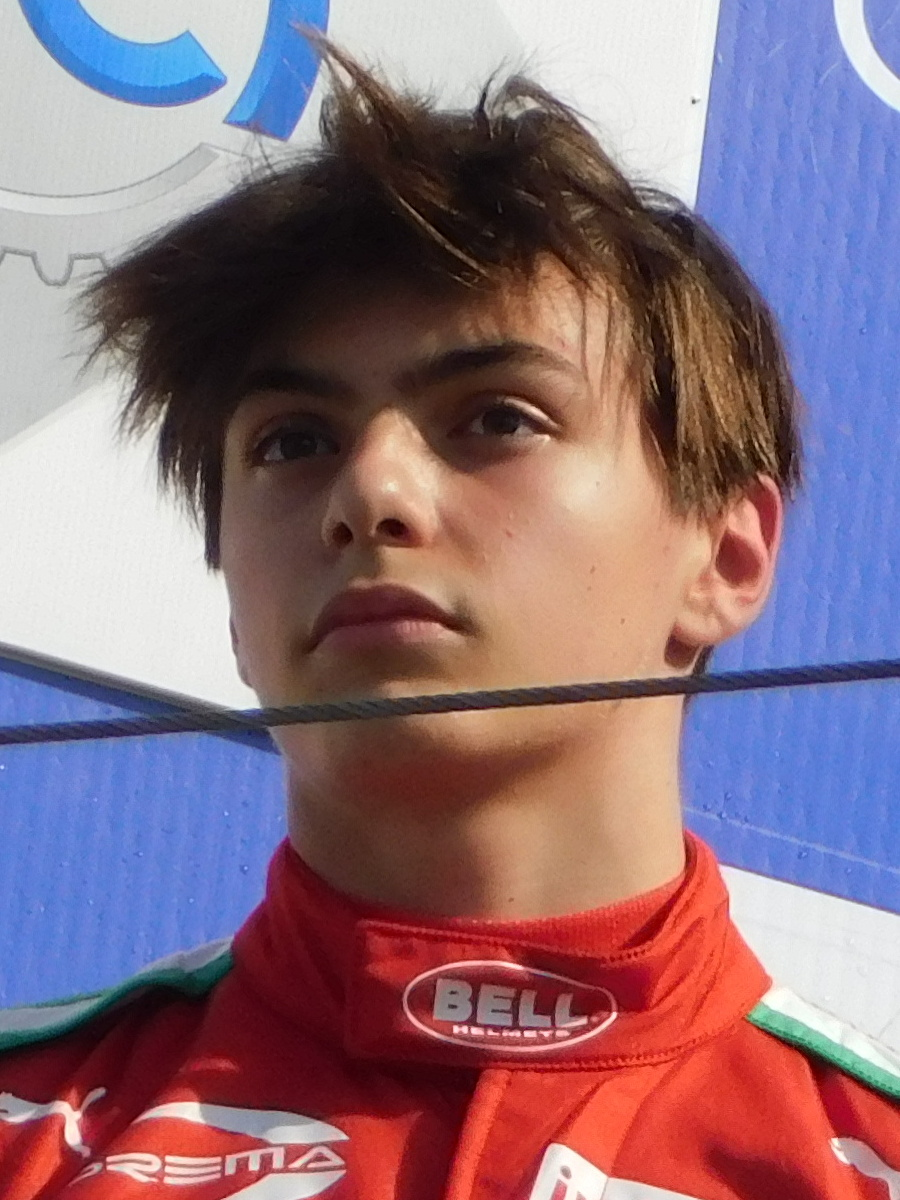
- Dupé in 2025
- Born: Andrea Charles Dupé Sebe; 12 July 2008 (age 18); Paris, France
- Nationality: (France) French

Formula Regional European Championship career
- Debut season: 2026
- Teams: Van Amersfoort Racing
- Car number: 19
- Starts: 7
- Wins: 0
- Podiums: 1
- Poles: 1
- Fastest laps: 0

Previous series
- 2026 2025 2025 2025: FR Middle East; E4; Italian F4; Formula Winter Series
- Website: www.andreadupe.com

Andrea Charles Dupé Sebe (born 12 July 2008) is a French racing driver who last competed in the Formula Regional European Championship with Van Amersfoort Racing.

Dupé is the vice-champion of the Italian ACI Karting Championship 2023 in the OK category.

== Career ==
=== Karting (2022–2024) ===
Dupé began his motorsport career at the age of eleven, competing in national and international karting events.

Dupé officially started competing in 2022 in the OK-Junior category with the Sodi Factory Team managed by Jean-Philippe Guignet At the CIK-FIA European Championship in Franciacorta, he qualified third. He later repeated this performance at the CIK-FIA World Championship in Sarno.

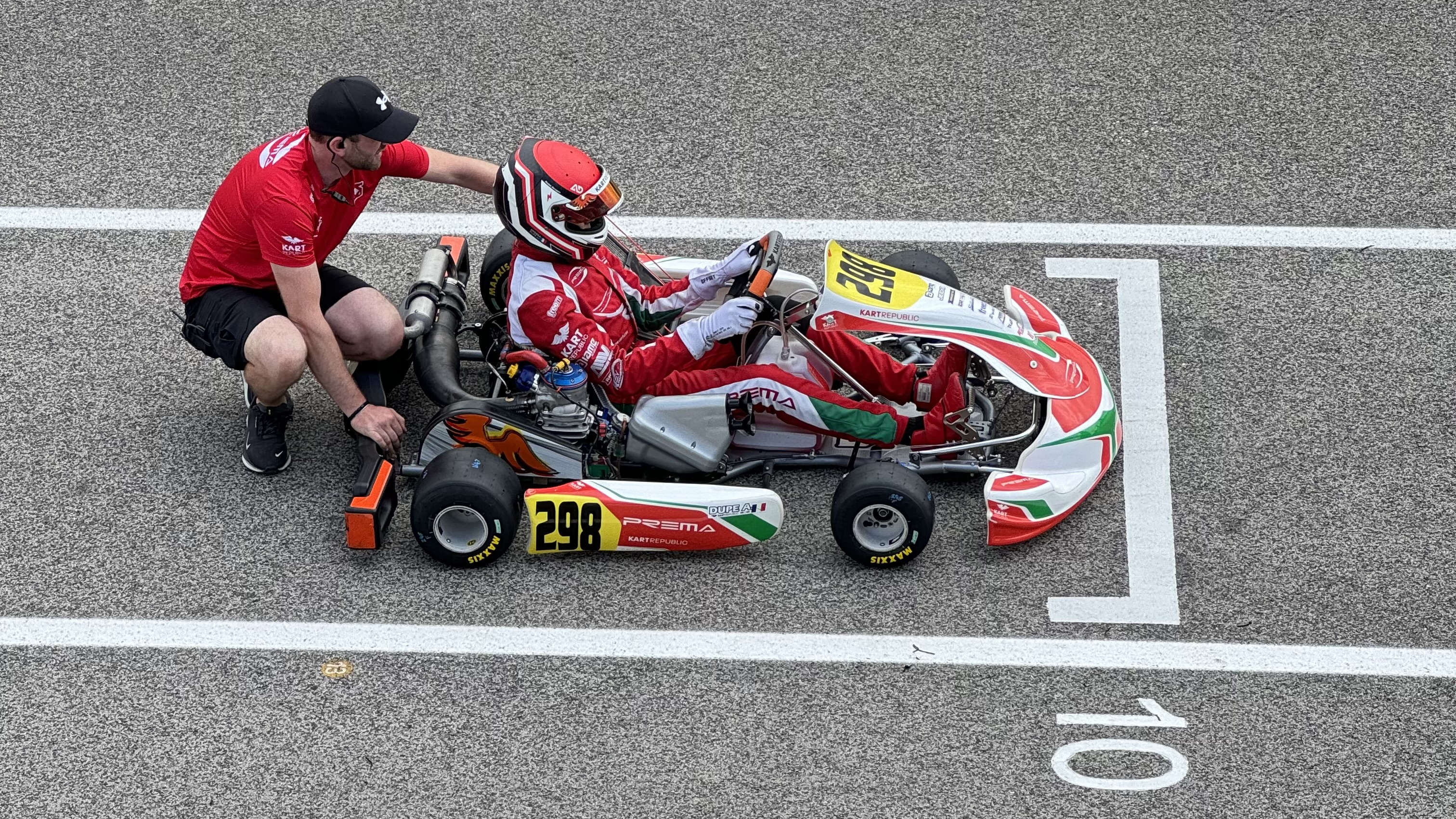
Andrea Dupé in Slovakia during 2024 European Championship final

In 2023, Dupé joined Kart Republic, a team managed by Dino Chiesa—mentor to champions such as Lewis Hamilton and Nico Rosberg. He ended the year as Vice Champion of the Italian Karting Championship in OK, ahead of fellow French drivers Maxens Verbrugge and Jules Caranta, the latter a member of the Red Bull Academy.

In 2024, Dupé joined the Prema Racing karting team.

However, a knee injury requiring surgery sidelined Dupé for much of the 2024 season. He returned at the European round in Slovakia, finished eighth at the Champions of the Future event, and he qualified for all the final rounds of the European and World Championships.

At the CIK-FIA World Championship at PFI (UK), Dupé qualified fourth in his group and finished 25th overall after an incident in the final. brought his karting career to an early close.

=== Formula 4 (2025) ===
==== 2024 ====
In 2024, Dupé tested a Formula 4 car for the first time at Cremona Circuit with AKM Motorsport, where he worked alongside Marco Antonelli and his son, Kimi Antonelli.

==== 2025 ====
Later in 2024, Dupé was selected to participate in the Richard Mille Young Talent Academy. He posted the fastest time in the pre-selection tests at Alcarràs Circuit, and finished fourth in the final shootout at Jerez, narrowly missing a fully funded seat with MP Motorsport in Spanish F4.

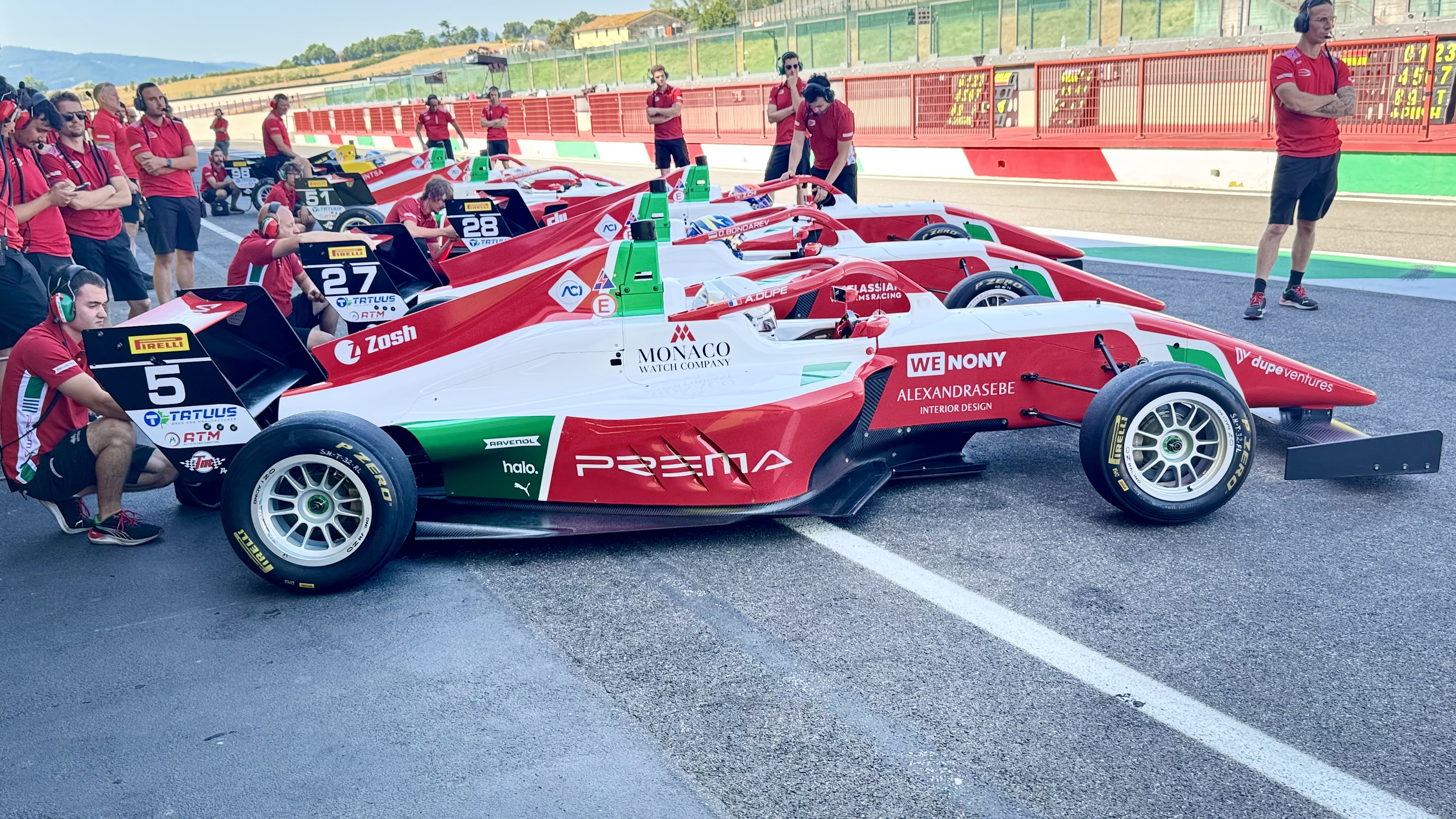
Andrea Dupé at Mugello Circuit

In early 2025, Dupé joined AS Motorsport for the Formula Winter Series. He scored points and contributed to the team's seventh-place finish in the team standings. He achieved multiple top-three finishes in the rookie classification, including a best result of eighth overall and second among rookies. Dupé then joined PHM Racing for the start of the 2025 Italian F4 Championship.

In July 2025, Dupé switched to Prema Racing for the remaining rounds of the Italian F4 Championship, competing alongside Kean Nakamura-Berta, Oleksandr Bondarev, Sebastian Wheldon, Zhenrui Chi, and Salim Hanna. He was committed to a full campaign in the 2025 E4 Championship.

=== Formula Regional (2026–) ===
==== 2026 ====
During pre-season, Dupé joined G4 Racing to contest the Formula Regional Middle East Trophy.

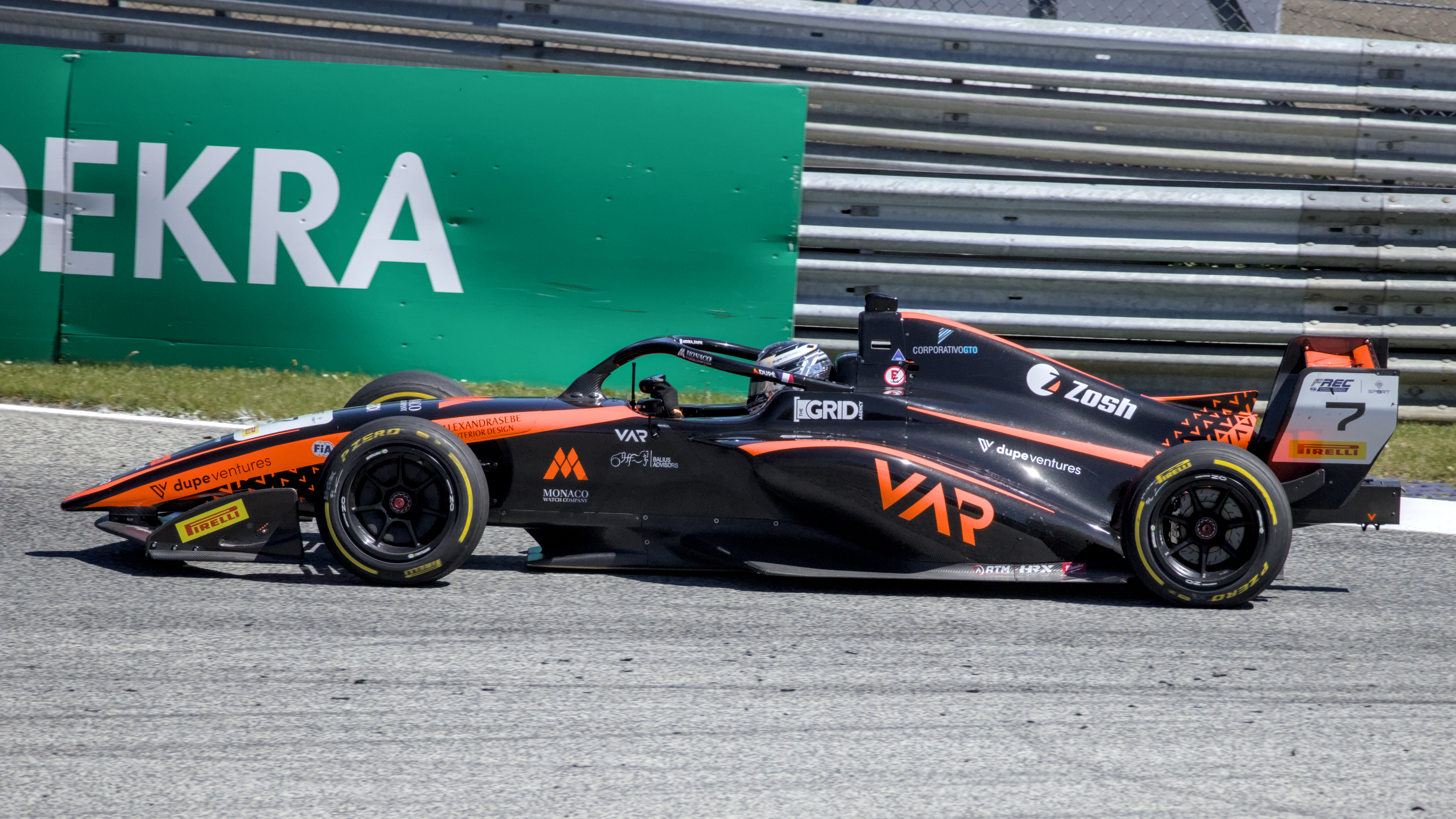
Dupé competing at the Red Bull Ring during the 2026 Formula Regional European Championship.

For his main campaign, Dupé joined Van Amersfoort Racing, racing in the Formula Regional European Championship. Ahead of the opening round, Auto Hebdo published a profile highlighting his progression through karting and junior single-seaters, as well as his resilience following several physical setbacks.

At Monza in June 2026, Dupé secured his first podium in the 2026 Formula Regional European Championship, finishing third after Sebastian Wheldon received two post-race five-second penalties.

At the end of the year, Dupe joined G4 Racing to compete in the Macau Grand Prix.

== Personal life ==
Dupé is coached by former French racing driver Bruno Besson.

As of January 2026, Dupé is a member of The Grid Agency, led by Guillaume Le Goff, and is managed by Jeremy Satis alongside Pierre Gasly and Isack Hadjar.

== Karting record ==
=== Karting career summary ===
Season	Series	Track	Category	Team	Position
2022	CIK-FIA World Championship	Sarnot - Italia	OK-Junior	Sodi Factory	P49 Semi-Final
2022	CIK-FIA European Championship	Franciacorta - Italia	OK-Junior	Sodi Factory	P34 Final
2022	Champions of the Future	Franciacorta - Italia	OK-Junior	Sodi Factory	P78 Semi-Final
2022	Italian ACI Championship	Franciacorta - Italia	X30 Junior	Team Driver	P23 Final
2022	IAME – Euro Series	Mariembourg - Belgium	X30 Junior	Team Driver	P23 Final
2022	Andrea Margutti Trophy	Lonato - Italia	X30 Junior	Team Driver	P31 Final
2022	IAME – Euro Series	Zuera - Spain	X30 Junior	Team Driver	P13 Final
2022	IAME – Winter Series	Valencia - Spain	X30 Junior	Team Driver	P29 Final
2023	WSK Final Cup	Lonato - Italia	OK	Kart Republic	P21 Final
2023	WSK Euro Series	Sarno - Italia	OK	Kart Republic	P1 Final
2023	CIK-FIA World Championship	Franciacorta - Italia	OK	Kart Republic	P23 Final
2023	Italian ACI Championship	Franciacorta - Italia	OK	Kart Republic	P2 Final
2023	CIK-FIA European Championship	Cremona - Italia	OK	Kart Republic	P43 Semi-Final
2023	CIK-FIA European Championship	Rodby - Danemark	OK	Sodi Factory	P50 Semi-Final
2023	CIK-FIA European Championship	Trinec - Czech	OK	Sodi Factory	P30 Final
2023	CIK-FIA European Championship	Valencia - Spain	OK	Sodi Factory	P31 Final
2024	CIK-FIA World Championship	PFI - United Kingdom	OK	Prema Racing	P25 Final
2024	CIK-FIA European Championship	Kristianstad - Sweden	OK	Prema Racing	P17 Final
2024	WSK Euro Series	Franciacorta - Italia	OK	Prema Racing	P8 Final
2024	CIK-FIA European Championship	Slovakia Ring - Slovakia	OK	Prema Racing	P20 Final
2024	Champions of the Future	Slovakia Ring - Slovakia	OK	Prema Racing	P8 Final

== Racing record ==
=== Racing career summary ===
Season	Series	Team	Races	Wins	Poles	F/Laps	Podiums	Points	Position
2025	Formula Winter Series	AS Motorsport	12	0	0	0	3	6	17th
2025	Italian F4 Championship	PHM Racing	8	0	0	0	0	20	22nd
2025	Italian F4 Championship	Prema Racing	9	0	0	0	0	20	22nd
2025	E4 Championship	Prema Racing	6	0	0	0	0	0	31st
2026	Formula Regional Middle East Trophy	G4 Racing	11	0	0	0	0	1	23rd
2026	Macau Grand Prix	G4 Racing	0	0	0	0	0	—N/a	TBD
2026	Formula Regional European Championship	Van Amersfoort Racing	19	0	0	0	1	8	26th

* Season still in progress.

=== Complete Formula Winter Series results ===
(key) (Races in bold indicate pole position) (Races in italics indicate fastest lap)

Year	Team	1	2	3	4	5	6	7	8	9	10	11	12	DC	Points
2025	AS Motorsport	POR; 1; 11	POR; 2; 18	POR; 3; 21	CRT; 1; 13	CRT; 2; 19	CRT; 3; 29†	ARA; 1; 11	ARA; 2; 13	ARA; 3; 12	CAT; 1; 10	CAT; 2; 8	CAT; 3; 15	17th	6

=== Complete Italian F4 Championship results ===
(key) (Races in bold indicate pole position; races in italics indicate fastest lap)

Year	Team	1	2	3	4	5	6	7	8	9	10	11	12	13	14	15	16	17	18	19	20	21	22	DC	Points
2025	PHM Racing	MIS1; 1; 14	MIS1; 2; 23	MIS1; 3 DNS	VLL; 1; 12	VLL; 2; 21	VLL; 3; 30	MNZ; 1 Ret	MNZ; 2; 21	MNZ; 3 Ret														22nd	20
2025	Prema Racing										MUG; 1; 35†	MUG; 2 WD	MUG; 3 WD	IMO; 1; 14	IMO; 2 C	IMO; 3 Ret	CAT; 1; 21	CAT; 2; 9	CAT; 3 C	MIS2; 1; 6	MIS2; 2; 6	MIS2; 3; 9	MIS2; 4; 31†	22nd	20

=== Complete E4 Championship results ===
(key) (Races in bold indicate pole position; races in italics indicate fastest lap)

Year	Team	1	2	3	4	5	6	7	8	9	DC	Points
2025	Prema Racing	LEC; 1	LEC; 2	LEC; 3	MUG; 1; 14	MUG; 2; 14	MUG; 3 Ret	MNZ; 1 Ret	MNZ; 2; 29†	MNZ; 3; 15	31st	0

=== Complete Formula Regional Middle East Trophy results ===
(key) (Races in bold indicate pole position) (Races in italics indicate fastest lap)

Year	Entrant	1	2	3	4	5	6	7	8	9	10	11	12	DC	Points
2026	G4 Racing	YMC1; 1; 20	YMC1; 2; 11	YMC1; 3; 23	YMC2; 1; 15	YMC2; 2; 26	YMC2; 3; 15	DUB; 1; 14	DUB; 2; 10	DUB; 3; 11	LUS; 1; 13	LUS; 2 C	LUS; 3; 20	23rd	1

=== Complete Formula Regional European Championship results ===
(key) (Races in bold indicate pole position) (Races in italics indicate fastest lap)

Year	Team	1	2	3	4	5	6	7	8	9	10	11	12	13	14	15	16	17	18	19	20	DC	Points
2026	Van Amersfoort Racing	RBR; 1; 27	RBR; 2; 20	RBR; 3; 17	ZAN; 1; 18	ZAN; 2; 11	SPA; 1; 22	SPA; 2 C	SPA; 3; 15	MNZ; 1; 18	MNZ; 2; 3	MNZ; 3; 16	HUN; 1; 28	HUN; 2; 15	LEC; 1; 22	LEC; 2; 22	IMO; 1; 25†	IMO; 2; 24	IMO; 3; 19	HOC; 1; 25	HOC; 2; 19	26th	8

=== Complete Macau Grand Prix results ===
Year	Team	Car	Qualifying	Quali Race	Main Race
2026	(Switzerland) G4 Racing	Tatuus T-326	TBD	TBD	TBD
