= Silverstone GP2 round =

(United Kingdom) Silverstone GP2 round

GP2 Series
- Venue: Silverstone Circuit
- Location: Silverstone, United Kingdom
- First race: 2005
- Last race: 2016
- Most wins (driver): (United Kingdom) Lewis Hamilton (Venezuela) Pastor Maldonado (2)
- Most wins (team): (France) ART Grand Prix (6)
- Lap record: 1:42.297 ( (New Zealand) Mitch Evans, RT Russian Time, GP2/11, 2014)

2005–2009 (Note: Bridge Grand Prix layout of the Silverstone Circuit, which held GP2 race in 2005–2009.)
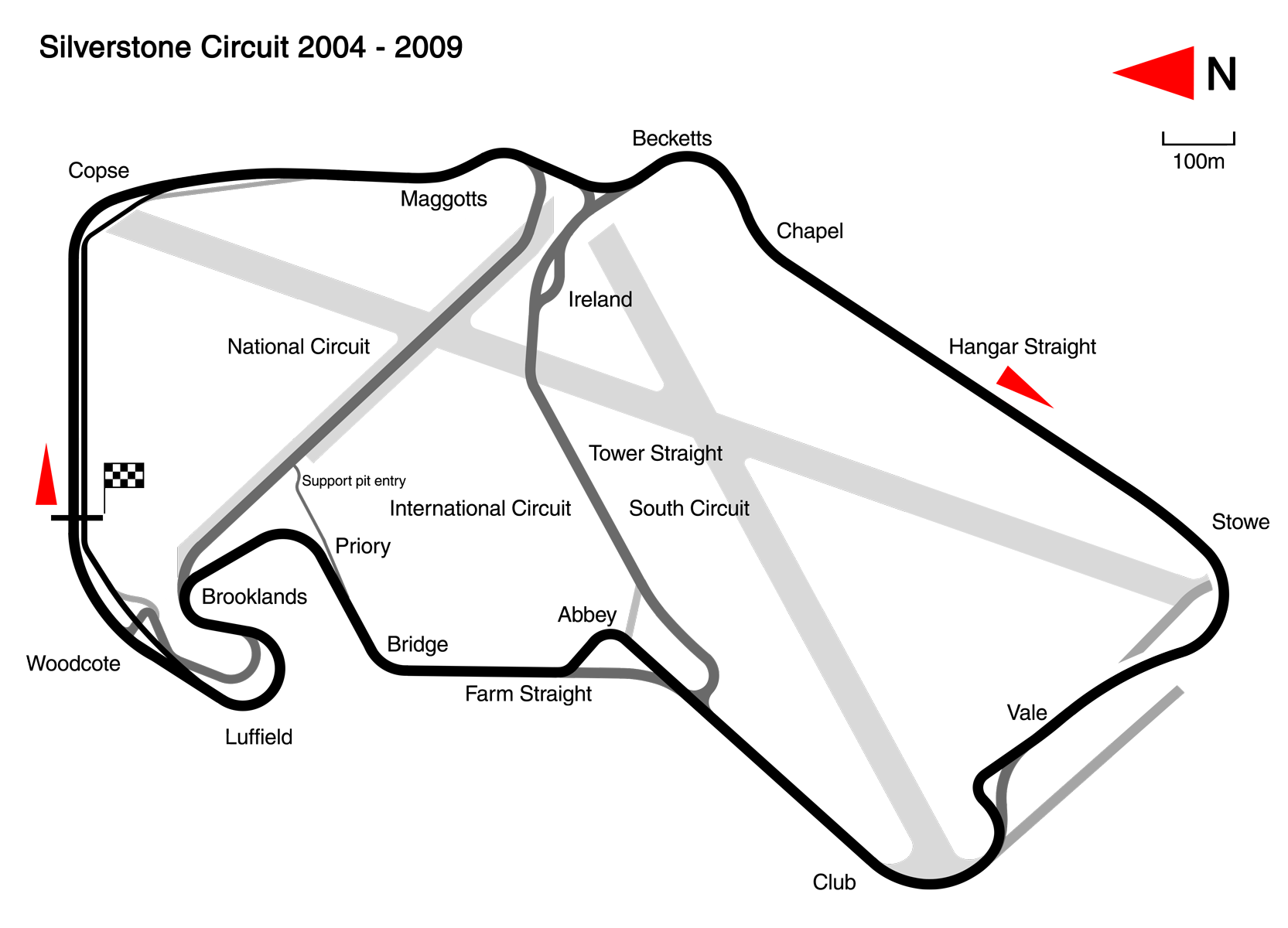
- Lap record: 1.29.069 ( (Brazil) Lucas di Grassi, Racing Engineering, GP2/08, 2009)

2010 (Note: Arena Grand Prix layout of the Silverstone Circuit, which held GP2 race in 2010.)
- Lap record: 1.41.610 ( (Mexico) Sergio Pérez, Barwa Addax Team, GP2/08, 2010)

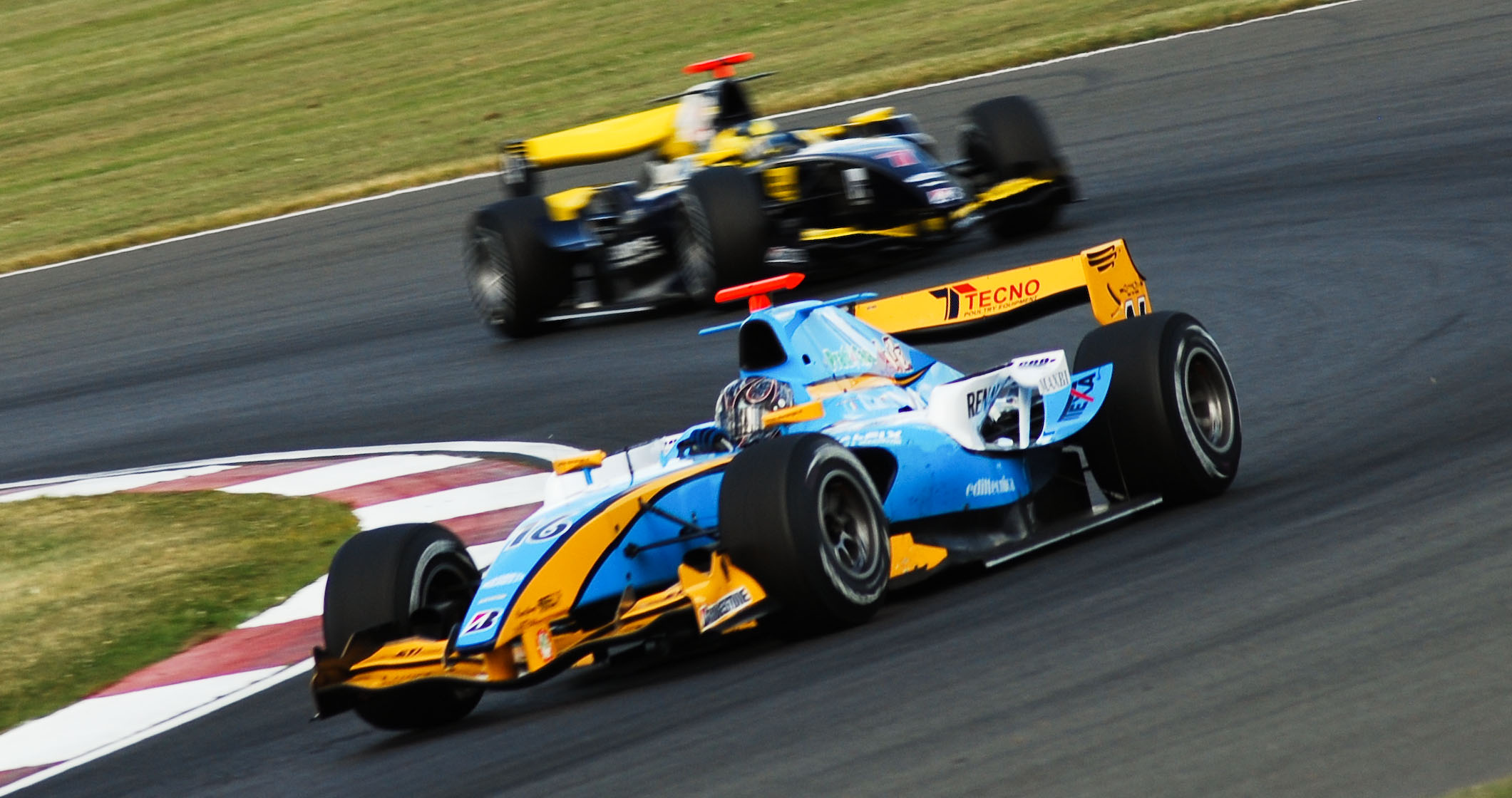
Davide Valsecchi in 2008.

The Silverstone GP2 round was a GP2 Series race that ran from on the Silverstone Circuit track in Silverstone, United Kingdom.

== Winners ==
Year	Race	Driver	Team	Report
2005	Feature	(Germany) Nico Rosberg	ART Grand Prix	Report
2005	Sprint	(France) Olivier Pla	DPR	Report
2006	Feature	(United Kingdom) Lewis Hamilton	ART Grand Prix	Report
2006	Sprint	(United Kingdom) Lewis Hamilton	ART Grand Prix	Report
2007	Feature	(United Arab Emirates) Andreas Zuber	iSport International	Report
2007	Sprint	(United Kingdom) Adam Carroll	Petrol Ofisi FMS International	Report
2008	Feature	(Italy) Giorgio Pantano	Racing Engineering	Report
2008	Sprint	(Brazil) Bruno Senna	iSport International	Report
2009	Feature	(Brazil) Alberto Valerio	Piquet GP	Report
2009	Sprint	(Venezuela) Pastor Maldonado	ART Grand Prix	Report
2010	Feature	(Venezuela) Pastor Maldonado	Rapax	Report
2010	Sprint	(Mexico) Sergio Pérez	Barwa Addax Team	Report
2011	Feature	(France) Jules Bianchi	Lotus ART	Report
2011	Sprint	(France) Romain Grosjean	DAMS	Report
2012	Feature	(Mexico) Esteban Gutiérrez	Lotus GP	Report
2012	Sprint	(Brazil) Luiz Razia	Arden International	Report
2013	Feature	(United Kingdom) Sam Bird	Russian Time	Report
2013	Sprint	(United Kingdom) Jon Lancaster	Hilmer Motorsport	Report
2014	Feature	(New Zealand) Mitch Evans	RT Russian Time	Report
2014	Sprint	(Brazil) Felipe Nasr	Carlin	Report
2015	Feature	(Russia) Sergey Sirotkin	Rapax	Report
2015	Sprint	(Indonesia) Rio Haryanto	Campos Racing	Report
2016	Feature	(France) Pierre Gasly	Prema Racing	Report
2016	Sprint	(United Kingdom) Jordan King	Racing Engineering	Report

== See also ==
- British Grand Prix
- Silverstone Formula 2 round
