= List of GP2 Series race winners =

GP2 Series, was the support series of the FIA Formula One World Championship. The GP2 Series season consisted of a series of races, divided to Feature (long distance) and Sprint (short races). Each winner was presented with a trophy and the results of each race were combined to determine two annual Championships, one for drivers and one for teams.

Stoffel Vandoorne holds the record for the most Grand Prix victories, having won eleven times. Pastor Maldonado is second with ten wins and Romain Grosjean with Giorgio Pantano are sharing third with nine wins. Luca Filippi holds the distinction of having the longest time between his first win and his last. He won his first GP2 race in 2007 GP2 Series in the Bahrain International Circuit, and his last in 2012 GP2 Series at Monza, a span of five years. Lewis Hamilton, Nelson Piquet Jr., Nico Hülkenberg and Davide Valsecchi sharing the record for the most consecutive wins, having won three races in a row.

The first GP2 race winner was Heikki Kovalainen in the 2005 Imola Feature race, and the last driver to score his first GP2 race win was Luca Ghiotto.

== By driver ==
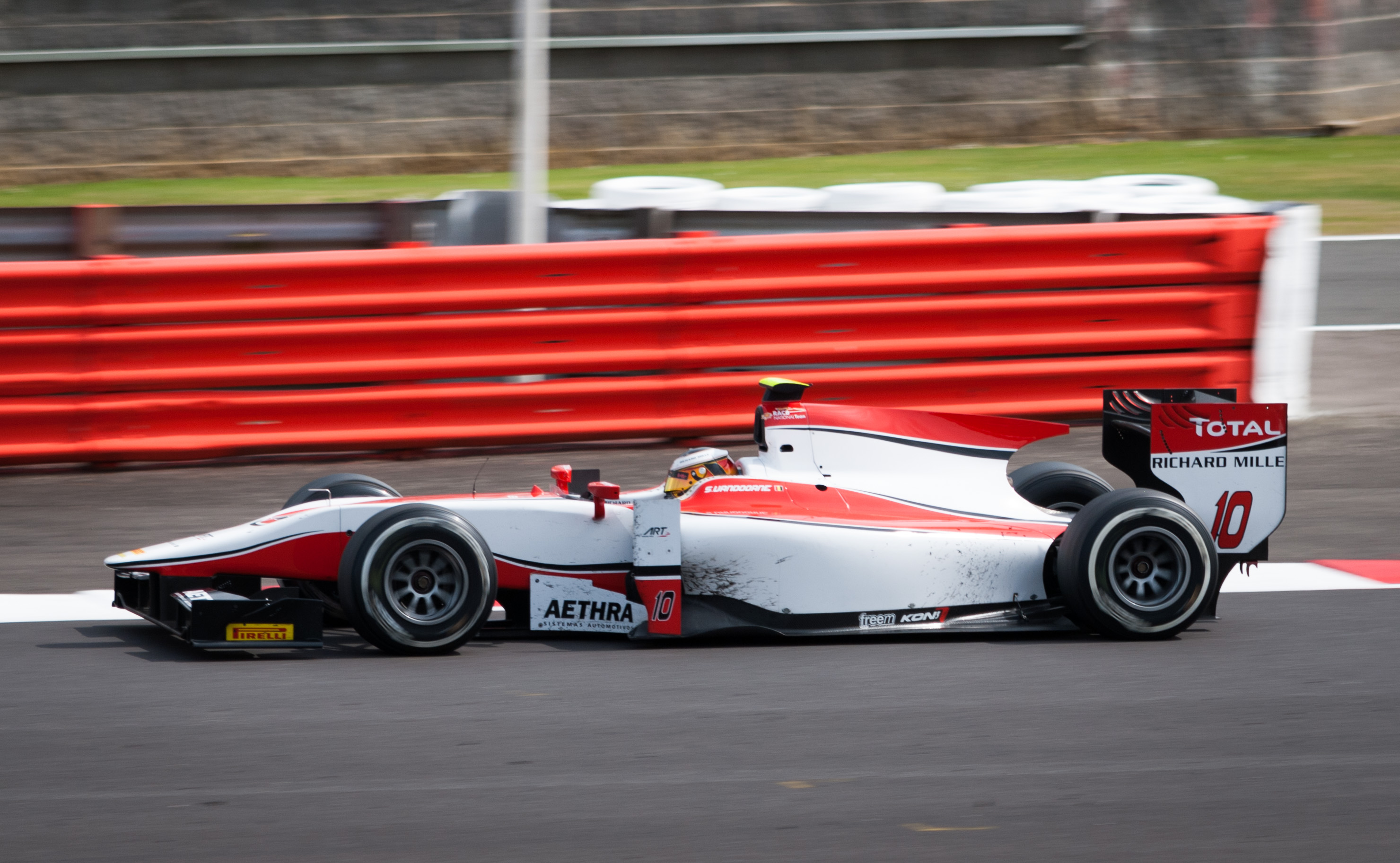
Stoffel Vandoorne won a record eleven races during his GP2 commitment.

Key
**Bold**	GP2 Series Champion

GP2 Series Race Winners
Rank	Country	Driver	Wins	Seasons active	First win	Last win
1	Belgium	**Stoffel Vandoorne**	11	2014–2015	2014 Bahrain Feature	2015 Yas Marina Feature
2	Venezuela	**Pastor Maldonado**	10	2007–2010	2007 Monaco Feature	2010 Spa Feature
3	France	**Romain Grosjean**	9	2008–2011	2008 Istanbul Park Sprint	2011 Hungaroring Feature
3	Italy	**Giorgio Pantano**	9	2005–2008	2006 Magny-Cours Sprint	2008 Hockenheim Feature
5	Monaco	Stefano Coletti	7	2009–2014	2011 Istanbul Park Sprint	2014 Yas Marina Sprint
5	Germany	**Timo Glock**	7	2006–2007	2006 Magny-Cours Feature	2007 Valencia Sprint
5	United Kingdom	**Jolyon Palmer**	7	2011–2014	2012 Monaco Sprint	2014 Sochi Feature
5	Italy	**Davide Valsecchi**	7	2008–2012	2008 Monza Sprint	2012 Monza Sprint
9	United Kingdom	Sam Bird	6	2010–2011; 2013	2010 Monza Feature	2013 Marina Bay Sprint
9	Italy	Luca Filippi	6	2006–2012	2007 Bahrain Feature	2012 Monza Feature
11	United Kingdom	Adam Carroll	5	2005–2008; 2011	2005 Imola Sprint	2007 Hungaroring Feature
11	Brazil	Lucas di Grassi	5	2006–2009	2007 Istanbul Park Feature	2009 Istanbul Park Sprint
11	New Zealand	Mitch Evans	5	2013–2016	2014 Silverstone Feature	2016 Red Bull Ring Feature
11	Italy	Antonio Giovinazzi	5	2016	2016 Baku Feature	2016 Sepang Feature
11	United Kingdom	**Lewis Hamilton**	5	2006	2006 Nürburgring Feature	2006 Silverstone Sprint
11	Germany	**Nico Hülkenberg**	5	2009	2009 Nürburgring Feature	2009 Algarve Feature
11	Finland	Heikki Kovalainen	5	2005	2005 Imola Feature	2005 Monza Feature
11	Switzerland	**Fabio Leimer**	5	2010–2013	2010 Catalunya Sprint	2013 Monza Feature
11	United Kingdom	Alex Lynn	5	2015–2016	2015 Catalunya Sprint	2016 Yas Marina Sprint
11	Mexico	Sergio Pérez	5	2009–2010	2010 Monaco Feature	2010 Yas Marina Feature
11	Brazil	Nelson Piquet Jr.	5	2005–2006	2005 Spa Feature	2006 Istanbul Park Feature
11	Brazil	Luiz Razia	5	2009–2012	2009 Monza Sprint	2012 Silverstone Sprint
11	Germany	**Nico Rosberg**	5	2005	2005 Magny-Cours Sprint	2005 Bahrain Sprint
11	Netherlands	Giedo van der Garde	5	2009–2012	2009 Hungaroring Sprint	2012 Marina Bay Sprint
25	United Kingdom	James Calado	4	2012–2013	2012 Sepang Sprint	2013 Yas Marina Sprint
25	Venezuela	Johnny Cecotto Jr.	4	2009–2015	2012 Monaco Feature	2014 Red Bull Ring Sprint
25	France	**Pierre Gasly**	4	2015–2016	2016 Silverstone Feature	2016 Yas Marina Feature
25	Mexico	Esteban Gutiérrez	4	2011–2012	2011 Valencia Sprint	2012 Hungaroring Sprint
25	Brazil	Felipe Nasr	4	2012–2014	2014 Catalunya Sprint	2014 Spa Sprint
25	Russia	Vitaly Petrov	4	2006–2009	2007 Valencia Feature	2009 Valencia Feature
25	United States	Alexander Rossi	4	2013–2015	2013 Yas Marina Feature	2015 Sochi Feature
32	Italy	Gianmaria Bruni	3	2005–2006	2005 Catalunya Feature	2006 Hockenheim Feature
32	Sweden	Marcus Ericsson	3	2010–2013	2010 Valencia Sprint	2013 Nürburgring Feature
32	Indonesia	Rio Haryanto	3	2012–2015	2015 Bahrain Sprint	2015 Silverstone Sprint
32	France	Charles Pic	3	2010–2011	2010 Catalunya Feature	2011 Monaco Sprint
32	France	Alexandre Prémat	3	2005–2006	2005 Hungaroring Sprint	2006 Catalunya Feature
32	Brazil	Bruno Senna	3	2007–2008	2007 Catalunya Feature	2008 Silverstone Sprint
32	Russia	Sergey Sirotkin	3	2015–2016	2015 Silverstone Feature	2016 Hockenheim Feature
32	Germany	Christian Vietoris	3	2010–2011	2010 Monza Sprint	2011 Monza Sprint
32	Spain	Javier Villa	3	2006–2009	2007 Magny-Cours Sprint	2007 Hungaroring Sprint
41	Switzerland	Sébastien Buemi	2	2007–2008	2008 Magny-Cours Sprint	2008 Hungaroring Sprint
41	India	Karun Chandhok	2	2007–2009	2007 Spa Sprint	2008 Hockenheim Sprint
41	United Kingdom	Max Chilton	2	2010–2012	2012 Hungaroring Feature	2012 Marina Bay Feature
41	Switzerland	Neel Jani	2	2005–2006	2005 Hungaroring Feature	2005 Monza Sprint
41	United Kingdom	Jordan King	2	2015–2016	2016 Red Bull Ring Sprint	2016 Silverstone Sprint
41	United Kingdom	Jon Lancaster	2	2012–2014	2013 Silverstone Sprint	2013 Nürburgring Sprint
41	France	Nicolas Lapierre	2	2005–2007	2007 Bahrain Sprint	2007 Spa Feature
41	Japan	Nobuharu Matsushita	2	2015–2016	2015 Hungaroring Sprint	2016 Monaco Sprint
41	France	Norman Nato	2	2015–2016	2016 Catalunya Feature	2016 Monza Sprint
41	Portugal	Alvaro Parente	2	2008–2011	2008 Catalunya Feature	2009 Spa Feature
41	France	Olivier Pla	2	2005–2007	2005 Silverstone Sprint	2005 Hockenheim Sprint
41	New Zealand	Richie Stanaway	2	2015	2015 Monaco Sprint	2015 Sochi Sprint
41	Venezuela	Ernesto Viso	2	2005–2007	2006 Imola Sprint	2006 Catalunya Sprint
41	United Arab Emirates	Andreas Zuber (Note: Zuber is an Austrian driver who competed under an Emirati racing licence.)	2	2006–2009	2006 Istanbul Park Sprint	2007 Silverstone Feature
55	Germany	Michael Ammermüller	1	2006–2007	2006 Valencia Sprint	
55	France	Nathanaël Berthon	1	2012–2015	2013 Hungaroring Sprint	
55	France	Jules Bianchi	1	2010–2011	2011 Silverstone Feature	
55	Spain	Dani Clos	1	2009–2013	2010 Istanbul Park Sprint	
55	United Kingdom	Mike Conway	1	2006–2008	2008 Monaco Sprint	
55	Belgium	Jérôme d'Ambrosio	1	2008–2010	2010 Monaco Sprint	
55	France	Tom Dillmann	1	2012–2014	2012 Bahrain 2 Sprint	
55	Netherlands	Robin Frijns	1	2013	2013 Catalunya Feature	
55	Italy	Luca Ghiotto	1	2016	2016 Sepang Sprint	
55	Japan	Kamui Kobayashi	1	2008–2009	2008 Catalunya Sprint	
55	Czech Republic	Josef Král	1	2010–2012	2012 Spa Sprint	
55	France; Argentina	José María López (Note: López is an Argentine driver who competed under a French racing licence in 2005.)	1	2005–2006	2005 Catalunya Sprint	
55	Italy	Raffaele Marciello	1	2014–2016	2014 Spa Feature	
55	Russia	Artem Markelov	1	2015–2016	2016 Monaco Feature	
55	Italy	Edoardo Mortara	1	2009	2009 Catalunya Sprint	
55	France	Arthur Pic	1	2014–2016	2014 Hungaroring Feature	
55	Monaco	Clivio Piccione	1	2005–2006	2005 Nürburgring Sprint	
55	United Kingdom	Adrian Quaife-Hobbs	1	2013–2014	2013 Monza Sprint	
55	Italy	Giacomo Ricci	1	2008–2010	2010 Hungaroring Sprint	
55	Monaco	Stéphane Richelmi	1	2011–2014	2014 Monaco Sprint	
55	Denmark	Marco Sørensen	1	2014–2015	2014 Sochi Sprint	
55	Brazil	Alberto Valerio	1	2008–2010	2009 Silverstone Feature	

== By nationality ==
List of races won by nationality of driver
Rank	Country	Wins	Driver(s)
1	United Kingdom	40	11
2	Italy	34	9
3	France	30	12
4	Brazil	23	6
5	Germany	21	5
6	Venezuela	16	3
7	Belgium	12	2
8	Mexico	9	2
8	Monaco	9	3
8	Switzerland	9	3
11	Russia	8	3
12	New Zealand	7	2
13	Netherlands	6	2
14	Finland	5	1
15	United States	4	1
15	Spain	4	2
17	Indonesia	3	1
17	Sweden	3	1
17	Japan	3	2
20	Portugal	2	1
20	India	2	1
20	United Arab Emirates	2	1
23	Czech Republic	1	1
23	Denmark	1	1

== By team ==
Key
**Bold**	GP2 Series Team Champion

Rank	Country	Team	Wins	Seasons active	First win	Last win
1	France	**ART Grand Prix**	48	2005–2016	2005 Magny-Cours Sprint	2016 Hockenheimring Feature
2	Spain	**Racing Engineering**	27	2005–2016	2005 Hungaroring Feature	2016 Monza Sprint
3	France	**DAMS**	25	2005–2016	2005 Catalunya Sprint	2016 Yas Marina Sprint
4	United Kingdom	**iSport International**	19	2005–2012	2005 Imola Feature	2012 Spa Feature
5	Netherlands; United Kingdom	Arden International	15	2005–2016	2005 Imola Feature	2013 Silverstone Sprint
6	Spain	**Addax Team**	14	2009–2013	2009 Catalunya Feature	2012 Spa Sprint
7	Spain; Indonesia	**Campos Racing**	12	2005–2008; 2014–2016	2007 Magny-Cours Feature	2016 Red Bull Ring Feature
7	Italy	**Rapax**	12	2010–2016	2010 Istanbul Park Feature	2015 Silverstone Feature
9	Italy	Coloni Motorsport	11	2005–2012	2005 Catalunya Feature	2012 Monza Feature
9	Italy	Trident Racing	11	2006–2016	2006 Imola Feature	2016 Sepang Sprint
11	Russia	**Russian Time**	10	2013–2016	2013 Bahrain Feature	2016 Monaco Feature
12	Italy	**Prema Racing**	9	2016	2016 Baku Feature	2016 Yas Marina Feature
13	United Kingdom	Carlin	8	2011–2016	2012 Hungaroring Feature	2014 Spa Sprint
14	United Kingdom	Super Nova Racing	7	2005–2011	2005 Imola Sprint	2010 Valencia Sprint
14	United Kingdom; Brazil	Piquet GP	7	2005–2009	2005 Spa Feature	2009 Silverstone Feature
16	Malaysia	Caterham Racing	4	2011–2014	2011 Monaco Feature	2013 Yas Marina Feature
16	Germany	Hilmer Motorsport	4	2013–2015	2013 Catalunya Feature	2013 Monza Sprint
18	Italy	Durango	3	2005–2009	2005 Nürburgring Sprint	2008 Monza Sprint
18	United Kingdom	DPR	3	2005–2010	2005 Silverstone Sprint	2010 Hungaroring Sprint
20	Portugal	Ocean Racing Technology	2	2009–2012	2009 Spa Feature	2010 Catalunya Sprint
20	Canada	Status Grand Prix	2	2015	2015 Monaco Sprint	2015 Sochi Sprint
22	Netherlands	MP Motorsport	1	2013–2016	2014 Sochi Sprint	2014 Sochi Sprint
