= Sepang GP2 round =

(Malaysia) Sepang GP2 round

GP2 Series
- Venue: Sepang International Circuit
- Location: Sepang, Malaysia
- First race: 2012
- Last race: 2016
- Lap record: 1:45.066 ( (Spain) Sergio Canamasas, Carlin, GP2/11, 2016)

(Malaysia) Sepang GP2 Asia round
GP2 Asia Series
- First race: 2008
- Last race: 2009
- Most wins (driver): (Russia) Vitaly Petrov (2)
- Most wins (team): (Spain) Barwa International Campos Team (2)
- Lap record: 1:46.405 ( (France) Romain Grosjean, ART Grand Prix, GP2/05, 2008)

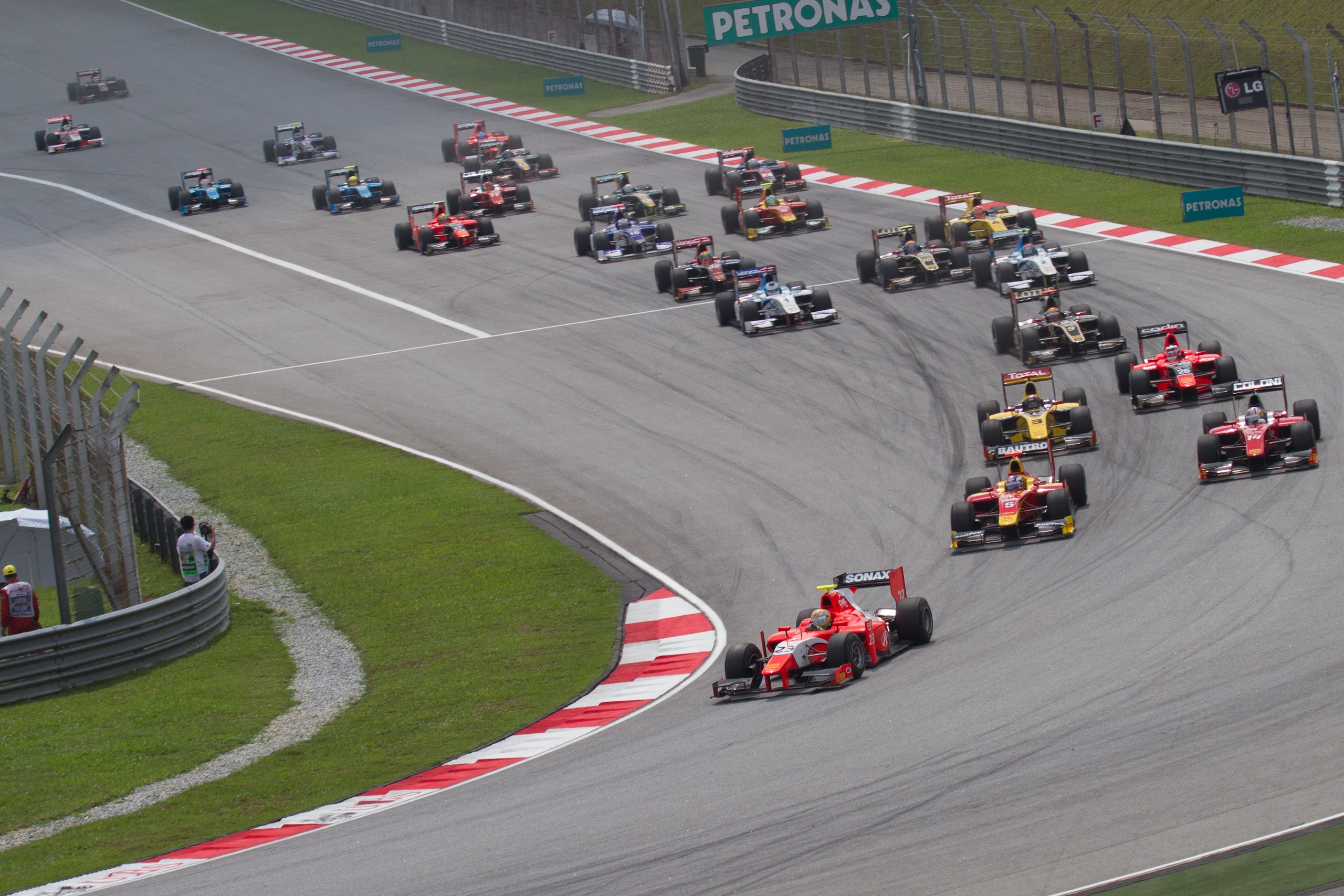
The start of the feature race at Sepang 2012.

The Sepang GP2 round was a GP2 Series race that ran from on the Sepang International Circuit track in Sepang, Malaysia.

== Winners ==
A green background indicates an event which was part of the GP2 Asia Series event.

Year	Race	Driver	Team	Report
2008	Feature	(Russia) Vitaly Petrov	Barwa International Campos Team	Report
2008	Sprint	(Japan) Kamui Kobayashi	DAMS	Report
2009	Feature	(Brazil) Diego Nunes	Piquet GP	Report
2009	Sprint	(Russia) Vitaly Petrov	Barwa International Campos Team	Report
2012	Feature	(Brazil) Luiz Razia	Arden International	Report
2012	Sprint	(United Kingdom) James Calado	Lotus GP	Report
2013	Feature	(Switzerland) Fabio Leimer	Racing Engineering	Report
2013	Sprint	(Monaco) Stefano Coletti	Rapax	Report
2016	Feature	(Italy) Antonio Giovinazzi	Prema Racing	Report
2016	Sprint	(Italy) Luca Ghiotto	Trident	Report

=== Fastest Laps ===
Year	Race	Driver	Team	Time	Lap
2008	Feature	(France) Romain Grosjean	ART Grand Prix	1:46.405	33
2008	Sprint	(Brazil) Bruno Senna	iSport International	1:46.548	20
2009	Feature	(Spain) Javier Villa Javier Villa (Note: Javier Villa set the fastest lap, but did not finish in the top 10, so was ineligible to be the point-scorer for the fastest lap. James Jakes was the point-scorer instead for setting the fastest lap of those finishing in the top 10.)	Super Nova Racing	1:48.208	21
2009	Sprint	(Portugal) Álvaro Parente	My Team Qi-Meritus Mahara	2:03.508	20
2012	Feature	(Italy) Davide Valsecchi	DAMS	1:49.246	24
2012	Sprint	(Italy) Fabrizio Crestani (Note: Fabrizio Crestani set the fastest lap, but did not finish in the top 10, so was ineligible to be the point-scorer for the fastest lap. Rio Haryanto was the point-scorer instead for setting the fastest lap of those finishing in the top 10.)	Venezuela GP Lazarus	1:50.690	8
2013	Feature	(United Kingdom) Sam Bird	Russian Time	1:48.777	16
2013	Sprint	(France) Nathanaël Berthon (Note: Nathanaël Berthon set the fastest lap, but did not finish in the top 10, so was ineligible to be the point-scorer for the fastest lap. Stefano Coletti was the point-scorer instead for setting the fastest lap of those finishing in the top 10.)	Trident Racing	1:48.780	18
2016	Feature	(Japan) Nobuharu Matsushita (Note: Nobuharu Matsushita set the fastest lap, but did not finish in the top 10, so was ineligible to be the point-scorer for the fastest lap. Sergey Sirotkin was the point-scorer instead for setting the fastest lap of those finishing in the top 10.)	ART Grand Prix	1:45.417	15
2016	Sprint	(Spain) Sergio Canamasas (Note: Sergio Canamasas set the fastest lap, but did not finish in the top 10, so was ineligible to be the point-scorer for the fastest lap. Pierre Gasly was the point-scorer instead for setting the fastest lap of those finishing in the top 10.)	Carlin	1:45.066	20

=== Pole Positions ===
Year	Driver	Team	Time
2008	(France) Romain Grosjean	ART Grand Prix	1:44.182
2009	(Belgium) Jérôme d'Ambrosio	DAMS	1:45.410
2012	(Italy) Davide Valsecchi	DAMS	1:45.494
2013	(Monaco) Stefano Coletti	Rapax	1:44.280
2016	(France) Pierre Gasly	Prema Racing	1:42.181
