= Imola Formula 2 round =

(Italy) Imola Formula 2 round

FIA Formula 2 Championship
- Venue: Autodromo Internazionale Enzo e Dino Ferrari
- Location: Imola, Emilia-Romagna, Italy
- First race: 2022
- Last race: 2025
- Lap record: 1:28.353 ( (India) Jehan Daruvala, (Italy) Prema Racing, Dallara F2 2018, 2022)

Imola GP2 Asia Series round
GP2 Asia Series
- Lap record: 1:28.097 ( (France) Romain Grosjean, DAMS, Dallara GP2/11, 2011)

Imola GP2 Series round

GP2 Series
- First race: 2005
- Last race: 2006
- Lap record: 1:34.231 ( (France) Nicolas Lapierre, Arden International, Dallara GP2/05, 2005)

The Imola Formula 2 round, formerly Imola GP2 Series round and Imola GP2 Asia Series round, was a FIA Formula 2 Championship series race that was run on the Autodromo Internazionale Enzo e Dino Ferrari in Imola, Emilia-Romagna, Italy.

== Winners ==
A green background indicates an event which was part of the GP2 Series or GP2 Asia Series event.

Year	Race	Driver	Team	Report
2005	Feature	(Finland) Heikki Kovalainen	Arden International	Report
2005	Sprint	(United Kingdom) Adam Carroll	Super Nova International	Report
2006	Feature	(Italy) Gianmaria Bruni	Trident	Report
2006	Sprint	(Venezuela) E. J. Viso	iSport International	Report
2011	Feature	(France) Romain Grosjean	DAMS	Report
2011	Sprint	(Spain) Dani Clos	Racing Engineering	Report
2022	Sprint	(New Zealand) Marcus Armstrong	Hitech Grand Prix	Report
2022	Feature	(France) Théo Pourchaire	ART Grand Prix	Report
2024	Sprint	(Argentina) Franco Colapinto	MP Motorsport	Report
2024	Feature	(France) Isack Hadjar	Campos Racing	Report
2025	Sprint	(United States) Jak Crawford	DAMS Lucas Oil	Report
2025	Feature	(Republic of Ireland) Alex Dunne	Rodin Motorsport	Report

== See also ==
- Emilia Romagna Grand Prix
