= GP2 Series =

Open wheel motor racing competitions

- Category: Single seaters
- Region: International
- Inaugural season: 2005
- Folded: 2016
- Chassis suppliers: Dallara
- Engine suppliers: Mecachrome (Note: In 2005-2010 Mecachrome engines were badged as "Renault".)
- Tyre suppliers: Pirelli
- Last Drivers' champion: (France) Pierre Gasly
- Last Teams' champion: (Italy) Prema Racing
- Official website: gp2series.com

The GP2 Series was a form of open wheel motor racing introduced in 2005 following the discontinuation of the long-term Formula One feeder series, Formula 3000. The GP2 format was conceived by Bernie Ecclestone and Flavio Briatore, while Ecclestone also has the rights to the name GP1. The series was organized by Bruno Michel. In 2010, the GP3 Series class was launched, as a feeder class for the GP2 series. In 2017, the series was rebranded as the FIA Formula 2 Championship.

Designed to make racing affordable for the teams and to make it a better training ground for life in Formula One, GP2 made it mandatory for all of the teams to use the same chassis, engine and tyre supplier so that true driver ability is reflected. All but three races had taken place as support races at Formula One race weekends to boost the series' profile, to give drivers experience of the Grand Prix environment, and to take advantage of the infrastructure (marshals, medical facilities etc.) in place for a Formula One event. GP2 mainly raced on European circuits, but also appeared on other international race tracks such as the Sepang International Circuit in Malaysia and the Marina Bay Street Circuit in Singapore.

Many drivers have used GP2 as a stepping stone into Formula One. The 2005 Champion Nico Rosberg was hired by the Williams team for the 2006 F1 campaign, 2006 GP2 winner Lewis Hamilton made the transition to F1 the following year with McLaren and the 2007 Champion Timo Glock to Toyota for the 2008 F1 season. 2009 GP2 champion Nico Hülkenberg moved up to a Williams F1 race drive in the 2010 Formula 1 season. In addition, Heikki Kovalainen (2005), Nelson Piquet Jr. (2006) and Lucas di Grassi (2007)—all runners up—became Renault test drivers the following year. All three earned F1 seats, but have since been replaced.

Karun Chandhok, Bruno Senna and Vitaly Petrov were also granted an F1 seat in 2010. For 2011 Pastor Maldonado was granted a seat at Williams, for 2012 Romain Grosjean at Lotus F1 Team. Sergio Pérez was given the drive alongside Kamui Kobayashi, another former GP2 driver and GP2 Asia Series winner, at Sauber. Jérôme d'Ambrosio got his Virgin Racing drive for the 2011 season. Some drivers however have reached Formula One without competing in GP2, including Sebastian Vettel, Paul di Resta, Daniel Ricciardo, Jean-Éric Vergne, Valtteri Bottas, Kevin Magnussen and Max Verstappen.

GP2 and GP2 Asia Series were later combined to make a single, longer GP2 series in 2012.

== GP2 Series and role ==
=== Progression to Formula One ===
Current Formula One drivers that have graduated from the GP2 series include Lewis Hamilton and Pierre Gasly (who triumphed in the 2016 staging amongst various others). Lewis Hamilton stepping straight into the McLaren team and Nico Rosberg, Nico Hülkenberg, Pastor Maldonado and Kazuki Nakajima going straight to Williams have particularly highlighted how F1 teams take GP2 seriously, and Hamilton's Formula One World Championship title in only his second year in F1 is probably the strongest example of the series creating highly competitive racers.

By the end of the 2016 season, nine of the twelve GP2 champions so far had been able to secure a seat in Formula 1, i.e. 75%.

== Race weekend ==
On Friday, drivers had a 45-minute free practice session and a 30-minute qualifying session. The qualifying session decided the grid order for Saturday's race which had a length of 180 kilometres (112 miles).

During Saturday's race, each driver had to make a pit stop in which at least two tyres have to be changed.

On Sunday there was a sprint race of 120 kilometres (75 miles). The grid was decided by the Saturday result with top 8 being reversed, so the driver who finished 8th on Saturday started from pole position and the winner started from 8th place. At 2005 Nürburgring, the sprint race was extended from 80 to 120 kilometres. This coincided with F1 dropping its second qualifying session on Sunday morning.

=== Points system ===
2005–2011

The one who drove the pole position to Saturday's races got two points.

Fastest lap: 1 point in each race (with one exception: in the 2005 season, it was 2 points for each race). Driver recording fastest lap has to drive 90% of race laps. As of 2006 season must the driver must now also start the race from his allocated grid position and as of 2008 must finish in the top ten of the race to be eligible for the fastest lap point.

With this points system, the most points anyone could score in one round is 20 by claiming pole position, winning both races with the fastest lap in each race. This feat was only achieved twice: Nelson Piquet Jr. in the 9th round of the 2006 season at the Hungaroring and Nico Hülkenberg in the 5th round of the 2009 season at the Nürburgring.

Point system for Feature Race
1st	2nd	3rd	4th	5th	6th	7th	8th	Pole	FL
10	8	6	5	4	3	2	1	2	2 (2005); 1 (2006–2011)

Point system for Sprint Race
1st	2nd	3rd	4th	5th	6th	FL
6	5	4	3	2	1	1

2012–2016

From the 2012 season the GP2 series changed its scoring system. Feature races ran with a scoring system similar to the one used in Formula One.

Pole position for the feature race was worth 4 points, and 2 points was given for the fastest lap in each race. Therefore, the maximum number of points a driver can score at any round will be 48.

Point system for Feature Race
1st	2nd	3rd	4th	5th	6th	7th	8th	9th	10th	Pole	FL
25	18	15	12	10	8	6	4	2	1	4	2

Point system for Sprint Race
1st	2nd	3rd	4th	5th	6th	7th	8th	FL
15	12	10	8	6	4	2	1	2

== Car specifications ==
The GP2 Series car was used by all of the teams, and features a Dallara carbon-fiber monocoque chassis powered by a Mecachrome normally-aspirated fuel-injected V8 engine and Pirelli dry slick and rain treaded tyres. Overall weight is 688 kg including driver.

=== Chassis ===
The 2011 specification GP2 Series car was designed by Dallara Automobili. The 2006 GP2 car featured a biplane rear wing, with the triplane rear wing used in previous seasons only to be used at the Monaco race. The front upper and lower wishbones have been reinforced, as have the front and rear suspension uprights. The Dallara GP2/11 were the obsolete chassis since the debut in 2011 and would be used until end of 2017 season. The price of Dallara GP2/11 FIA Formula 2 Championship cars are approximately up to €1.5 million-€2 million per car (including wheels, tyres, wings, steering wheel and other components excluding engine).

=== Engine ===
The 4.0-litre naturally-aspirated electronic indirect fuel-injected Mecachrome V8 engine features internal, cartographic and software upgrades designed to improve performance and fuel consumption. The engine produces 612 hp and 500 Nm (380 ft-lb) of torque @ 8500 rpm. FIA Formula 2 Championship Series engines are rev-limited to 10000 rpm and need a rebuild after 4000 to 4500 km. The valve train is a dual overhead camshaft configuration with four valves per cylinder. The Mecachrome V8 engine weight is 326 lb (148 kg). The crankshaft is made of alloy steel, with five main bearing caps. The pistons are forged aluminum alloy, while the connecting rods are machined alloy steel. The electronic engine management system is supplied by Magneti Marelli, firing a high-power inductive (coil-controlled) ignition system. The engine lubrication is a dry sump type, cooled by a single water pump.

Mecachrome came to the GP2 Series in 2005, and by 2005 was clearly the dominant engine manufacturer. Starting in 2005, they became the only engine manufacturer in the GP2 Series, and continued in that capacity through 2016. Mecachrome also has a mutually beneficial technical relationship with Teos Engineering of Montigny-le-Bretonneux. They will continue working together for on-going research and development, engine maintenance and trackside support for the Mecachrome GP2 V8 racing engine at all GP2 Series venues.

During that time, since the GP2 Series had only one engine manufacturer, Mecachrome still focusing on minimizing engine failure and minimizing costs instead of defeating rivals. As such, the engines were moderately de-tuned. The engines proved themselves to be quite durable—there had been no engine failures at all F2 tracks from 2005 to present, which also lowered the number of crashes. Most of the engines, including those used for the Monaco race, are used for multiple races and were intended to last 1,100 miles between rebuilds. The Mecachrome engines were only available via lease arrangement from Mecachrome currently.

Mecachrome V8 GP2 engines were crated and shipped to all GP2 teams on a serial-number basis as determined by the sanctioning body (FIA) to ensure equality and fairness in distribution.

=== Fuel and lubricants components ===
Since 2005, Elf exclusively provide the LMS 102 unleaded fuel and also Elf HTX 840 0W-40 lubricants for all GP2 Series cars (except Total Quartz 9000 with ART Grand Prix).

=== Gearbox ===
The current gearbox has been manufactured by Hewland and features an 8-position barrel with ratchet body and software upgrades as well as a new transverse shafts fixing system designed to facilitate improved gear selection. The GP2 gearbox used a 6-speed sequential gearbox configuration with electronically controlled paddle-shifters + reverse gear operated by a button on the steering wheel.

=== Wheel rims ===
O.Z. Racing exclusively supplied wheel rims for all GP2 Series cars from 2005 until the final season.

=== Tyres ===
Similar to the 2011 change for Formula 1, Pirelli was the sole tyre supplier for the series. The GP2 Series runs the same compounds as F1. The front tyre size are 245/660-R13 and rear tyre size are 325/660-R13. Previously Bridgestone was the official tyre partner of GP2 Series in 2005 until 2010.

=== Brakes ===
Brembo supplied monobloc brake calipers and disc bells, which are exclusive to the GP2 Series. Hitco also supplies carbon brake discs and pads for FIA Formula 2 Championship. The brake discs are 278 x 28 mm in size (similar to Formula One).

=== Other parts ===
The car also features internal cooling upgrades, a new water radiator, radiator duct, oil/water heat exchanger, modified oil degasser, new oil and water pipes and new heat exchanger fixing brackets.

=== Steering wheel ===
From 2011, XAP Technology exclusively provided the XAP single-seater GP2 Series steering wheel as well as XAP SX steering wheel dash display. The XAP steering wheel features 6 buttons in the front with 5 paddles (DRS, gear shift and clutch) in the back of steering wheel.

=== Performance ===
According to research and pre-season stability tests, the 2005 model can go 0 to 200 km/h (124 mph) in 6.7 seconds. The car has a top speed of 320 km/h (198 mph) meaning that it is the fastest single seater racing car behind Formula One and IndyCar Series. The 2011 model can go 0 to 200 km/h (124 mph) in 6.6 seconds. The car has a top speed of 332 km/h (208 mph) with the Monza aero configuration.

=== Specifications (2011–2016) ===
- Engine displacement: 4.0 L (244 cu in) DOHC V8
- Gearbox: 6-speed paddle shift sequential gearbox (must have reverse)
- Weight: 1,517 lb (688 kg) (including driver)
- Power output: 612 hp (456 kW)
- Fuel: Elf LMS 102 RON unleaded
- Fuel capacity: 33 US gallons (125 litres)
- Fuel delivery: Fuel injection
- Aspiration: Naturally aspirated
- Length: 5,065 mm (199 in)
- Width: 1,800 mm (71 in)
- Wheelbase: 3,120 mm (123 in)
- Steering: Non-assisted rack and pinion

== Champions ==
=== Drivers ===
Season	Driver	Team	Poles	Wins	Podiums	Fastest laps	Points	% points achievable	Clinched	Margin	Ref
2005	(Germany) Nico Rosberg	(France) ART Grand Prix	4	5	12	5	120	52.288	2005 Bahrain Feature Race	15	
2006	(United Kingdom) Lewis Hamilton	(France) ART Grand Prix	1	5	14	7	114	53.521	2006 Monza Feature Race	12	
2007	(Germany) Timo Glock	(United Kingdom) iSport International	4	5	10	4	88	41.315	2007 Valencia Sprint Race	11	
2008	(Italy) Giorgio Pantano	(Spain) Racing Engineering	4	4	7	4	76	38.000	2008 Monza Feature Race	12	
2009	(Germany) Nico Hülkenberg	(France) ART Grand Prix	3	5	10	5	100	50.000	2009 Monza Sprint Race	25	
2010	(Venezuela) Pastor Maldonado	(Italy) Rapax	4	4	7	4	87	43.500	2010 Monza Sprint Race	12	
2011	(France) Romain Grosjean	(France) DAMS	1	5	10	6	89	49.444	2011 Spa-Francorchamps Feature Race	35	
2012	(Italy) Davide Valsecchi	(France) DAMS	2	4	10	5	247	42.882	2012 Marina Bay Feature Race	25	
2013	(Switzerland) Fabio Leimer	(Spain) Racing Engineering	1	3	7	1	201	38.068	2013 Yas Marina Feature Race	20	
2014	(United Kingdom) Jolyon Palmer	(France) DAMS	3	4	12	7	276	52.272	2014 Sochi Feature Race	47	
2015	(Belgium) Stoffel Vandoorne	(France) ART Grand Prix	4	7	16	7	341.5	68.643	2015 Sochi Sprint Race	160	
2016	(France) Pierre Gasly	(Italy) Prema Racing	4	4	9	3	219	41.477	2016 Yas Marina Sprint Race	8	

=== Teams ===
Season	Team	Poles	Wins	Podiums	Fastest laps	Points	Clinched	Margin	Ref
2005	(France) ART Grand Prix	5	7	19	7	187	2005 Spa-Francorchamps Sprint Race	61	
2006	(France) ART Grand Prix	1	6	22	9	180	2006 Istanbul Park Feature Race	12	
2007	(United Kingdom) iSport International	5	6	13	6	118	2007 Valencia Feature Race	31	
2008	(Spain) Barwa International Campos Team	0	4	9	3	103	2008 Monza Sprint Race	8	
2009	(France) ART Grand Prix	3	7	22	6	180	2009 Algarve Feature Race	65	
2010	(Italy) Rapax	5	4	9	5	115	2010 Yas Marina Sprint Race	5	
2011	(Spain) Barwa Addax Team	4	2	9	1	101	2011 Monza Sprint Race	12	
2012	(France) DAMS	2	4	14	5	342	2012 Marina Bay Sprint Race	6	
2013	(Russia) Russian Time	3	5	9	5	273	2013 Yas Marina Sprint Race	0	
2014	(France) DAMS	4	5	14	7	349	2014 Yas Marina Feature Race	57	
2015	(France) ART Grand Prix	4	8	19	8	410	2015 2nd Bahrain Feature Race	160	
2016	(Italy) Prema Racing	6	9	17	5	430	2016 Sepang Feature Race	172	

== Drivers graduated to F1 ==
As of the 2020 Formula One season, 35 out of 174 drivers have raced in Formula One (20.1%).

Driver	GP2					Formula 1					Other major titles after GP2
Driver	Seasons	Races	Wins	Podiums	Best pos.	Seasons	First team	Races	Wins	Podiums	Other major titles after GP2
(Germany) Nico Rosberg	2005	23	5	12	**1st**	2006–2016	Williams	206	23	57	Formula One (2016)
(United States) Scott Speed	2005	23	0	5	**3rd**	2006–2007	Toro Rosso	28	0	0	Global RallyCross Championship (2015, 2016, 2017)
(United Kingdom) **Lewis Hamilton**	2006	21	5	14	**1st**	2007–2026	McLaren	401	106	209	Formula One (2008, 2014–2015, 2017–2020)
(Finland) Heikki Kovalainen	2005	23	5	12	**2nd**	2007–2013	Renault	111	1	4	Super GT (2016)
(Japan) Sakon Yamamoto	2007–2008	21	0	0	23rd	2006–2007, 2010	Super Aguri	21	0	0	
(Japan) Kazuki Nakajima	2007	21	0	6	5th	2007–2009	Williams	36	0	0	Formula Nippon (2012), Super Formula (2014), FIA WEC (2018-19), 24 Hours of Le Mans (2018, 2019, 2020)
(Germany) Timo Glock	2006–2007	40	7	15	**1st**	2004, 2008–2012	Jordan	91	0	3	
(Brazil) Nelson Piquet Jr.	2005–2006	43	5	13	**2nd**	2008–2009	Renault	28	0	1	Formula E (2014–15)
(Switzerland) Sébastien Buemi	2007–2008	30	2	5	6th	2009–2011	Toro Rosso	55	0	0	FIA WEC (2014, 2018-19, 2022, 2023), 24 Hours of Le Mans (2018, 2019, 2020, 2022), Formula E (2015–16)
(France) Romain Grosjean	2008–2011	58	9	21	**1st**	2009, 2012–2020	Renault	179	0	10	
(Japan) Kamui Kobayashi	2008–2009	40	1	2	16th	2009–2012, 2014	Toyota	75	0	1	FIA WEC (2019-20, 2021), 24 Hours of Le Mans (2021, 2026)
(Germany) **Nico Hülkenberg**	2009	20	5	10	**1st**	2010, 2012–2020, 2022–2026	Williams	270	0	1	24 Hours of Le Mans (2015)
(Russia) Vitaly Petrov	2006–2009	69	4	11	**2nd**	2010–2012	Renault	57	0	1	
(Brazil) Lucas di Grassi	2006–2009	75	5	21	**2nd**	2010	Virgin	18	0	0	Formula E (2016–17)
(Brazil) Bruno Senna	2007–2008	41	3	9	**2nd**	2010–2012	HRT	46	0	0	
(India) Karun Chandhok	2007–2009	61	2	5	10th	2010–2011	HRT	11	0	0	
(Venezuela) Pastor Maldonado	2007–2010	72	10	18	**1st**	2011–2015	Williams	95	1	1	
(Mexico) **Sergio Perez**	2009–2010	40	5	9	**2nd**	2011–2024,2026	Sauber	302	6	39	
(Belgium) Jérôme d'Ambrosio	2008–2010	58	1	7	9th	2011–2012	Virgin	20	0	0	
(France) Charles Pic	2010–2011	37	3	7	4th	2012–2013	Marussia	39	0	0	
(Mexico) Esteban Gutiérrez	2011–2012	41	4	9	**3rd**	2013–2014, 2016	Sauber	59	0	0	
(France) Jules Bianchi	2010–2011	37	1	10	**3rd**	2013–2014	Marussia	34	0	0	
(United Kingdom) Max Chilton	2010–2012	62	2	4	4th	2013–2014	Marussia	35	0	0	
(Netherlands) Giedo van der Garde	2009–2012	82	5	18	5th	2013	Caterham	19	0	0	European Le Mans Series (2016)
(Sweden) Marcus Ericsson	2010–2013	84	3	13	6th	2014–2018	Caterham	97	0	0	2022 Indianapolis 500
(United States) Alexander Rossi	2013–2015	53	4	11	**2nd**	2014–2015	Marussia	5	0	0	2016 Indianapolis 500
(Brazil) Felipe Nasr	2012–2014	68	4	20	**3rd**	2015–2016	Sauber	39	0	0	IMSA SportsCar Championship (2018, 2021, 2024)
(United Kingdom) Jolyon Palmer	2011–2014	84	7	18	**1st**	2016–2017	Renault	35	0	0	
(Indonesia) Rio Haryanto	2012–2015	89	3	7	4th	2016	Manor	12	0	0	
(Belgium) Stoffel Vandoorne	2014–2015	43	11	26	**1st**	2016–2018	McLaren	41	0	0	Formula E (2021–22)
(Italy) Antonio Giovinazzi	2016	22	5	8	**2nd**	2017, 2019–2021	Sauber	62	0	0	24 Hours of Le Mans (2023), FIA WEC (2025)
(France) **Pierre Gasly**	2014–2016	49	4	13	**1st**	2017–2026	Toro Rosso	198	1	5	
(New Zealand) Brendon Hartley	2010–2012	12	0	0	19th	2017–2018	Toro Rosso	25	0	0	FIA WEC (2015, 2017, 2022, 2023), 24 Hours of Le Mans (2017, 2020, 2022)
(Russia) Sergey Sirotkin	2015–2016	43	3	13	**3rd**	2018	Williams	21	0	0	
(Canada) Nicholas Latifi	2014–2016	31	0	1	16th	2020–2022	Williams	61	0	0	

Notes:

- **Bold** denotes an active Formula One driver.
- Glock had four Grand Prix starts in 2004 for Jordan; his first Formula One team after driving in GP2 2006–07 was Toyota.
- Romain Grosjean returned to GP2 after losing his 2010 Formula One seat. He signed a contract with Lotus Renault for 2012 and returned to Formula One.
- Alexander Rossi occupied Roberto Merhi's seat at Manor for five of the last seven races of the 2015 Formula 1 season.
- 2008 GP2 champion Giorgio Pantano drove the 2004 season in Formula One for Jordan before driving in GP2. He had previously driven in F3000.
- Gianmaria Bruni and Antônio Pizzonia also both raced in Formula One before making race appearance in GP2.
- Sakon Yamamoto raced in F1 with Super Aguri in 2006. For 2007, he moved down to GP2, before returning to F1 with Spyker mid-season. He then joined HRT in 2010.
- The table is up to 2026 Las Vegas Grand Prix

== History of previous seasons ==
=== 2005 ===
The 2005 Season was the first of the series, succeeding the now defunct Formula 3000 championship. Arden International won the last F3000 titles, thus starting as one of the favourites.

The 2005 season began on April 23, 2005, on the weekend of the San Marino Grand Prix at the Autodromo Enzo e Dino Ferrari in Imola, Italy. In the pre-season test to decide the inaugural season's car numbers, the iSport International and HiTech/Piquet Racing teams showed a competitive edge. The latter team was largely funded by the former Formula One world champion Nelson Piquet in order to aid his son's route to the premier Formula sport.

The championship lasted 23 rounds, two races occurring a weekend with the exception of a single race in Monaco. It was won by German Nico Rosberg, who was subsequently hired by the WilliamsF1 Team, with Heikki Kovalainen finishing second.

It was also notable for being the only season that GP2 used grooved tyres like F1 cars rather than slicks.

=== 2006 ===
The 2006 season was the second of the series. After championship holder Nico Rosberg's move to the Williams F1 team, and runner-up Heikki Kovalainen's move to be reserve driver at Renault F1, Nelson Piquet Jr. in the Piquet Sports car was installed as the early title favourite, though the ART Grand Prix cars of Alexandre Prémat and Lewis Hamilton also had fairly short odds, given ART were reigning champions.

For the first time, the season began on a calendar separate to the 2006 Formula One calendar, starting out at the Circuit de Valencia, in Valencia, Spain on April 8, 2006, with Piquet Jr. the first victor.

Piquet raced into an early lead before Lewis Hamilton came back into the fray. A dominant run by the Briton took him into the championship lead before the balance came back into Piquet Jr.'s favour.

After an exciting championship battle lasting 20 races, Hamilton claimed the title in the penultimate race, at the Autodromo Nazionale Monza, in Monza, Italy, and celebrated with a second place in the 21st and final round.

=== 2007 ===
The 2007 GP2 Series began on 13 April at the Bahrain International Circuit, and completed on 30 September at the Circuit de Valencia (which was the only race that wasn't on the F1 calendar). Eventual champion Timo Glock was a driving force throughout the series but came under stiff competition from Lucas di Grassi in the closing stages- however, with a convincing win at the last race in Valencia, Glock sealed the championship. The season was the last with the first-generation chassis, the GP2/05.

=== 2008 ===
The 2008 GP2 Series featured the same teams as in previous seasons. This was also the first time that the calendar supported all of the F1 races in Europe with a late deal to run at the Valencia Street Circuit. It was the first season to feature a new car design from Dallara, the GP2/08, the only non-F1 car to pass the 2007 FIA crash test in full. In the United Kingdom, the 2008 GP2 Series was exclusively aired on ITV4 from April 2008. It was won by Giorgio Pantano for Racing Engineering, with Bruno Senna finishing distant runner-up.

=== 2009 ===
The 2009 season began and ended on the Iberian peninsula, with the first race weekend at Circuit de Catalunya (9–10 May) and ending in the stand-alone headline event (i.e. not supporting a corresponding Formula One event) at Portugal's Autódromo Internacional do Algarve (19–20 September). The title was won by German rookie Nico Hülkenberg at the penultimate round of the championship at Monza, the second time the championship had been won before the last race.

=== 2010 ===
The 2010 season contained ten rounds, all of which were supporting F1 World Championship. The series started in May at Catalunya and concluded at Abu Dhabi in November.

Pastor Maldonado won the title in his fourth season in the series. He won a record-breaking six successive feature races mid-season. Sergio Pérez was his closest rival, but the title was sealed already in the penultimate round at Monza. It was the last season for the Dallara GP2/08 chassis and Bridgestone as the series' official tyre supplier.

=== 2011 ===
The 2011 season contained nine rounds and a final tenth round with no points, all of which were supporting F1 World Championship. The series started in May at Istanbul and concluded at Abu Dhabi in November.

The championship was won by reigning GP2 Asia champion Romain Grosjean at the penultimate round of the series. Following a three-year cycle, the previous GP2 chassis was replaced by a brand new car, the GP2/11, built by Italian racing car manufacturer Dallara. The series will change tyre supplier from Bridgestone to Pirelli for 2011–13. The 2011 season saw the addition of two new teams to the grid, Carlin and Team AirAsia. Meanwhile, DPR was not selected to continue in the series.

=== 2012 ===
The 2012 season contained twelve rounds, eleven of which supported the F1 World Championship and one stand alone round in Bahrain. The series started on March 24 in Malaysia and concluded in Singapore on September 23. Davide Valsecchi (DAMS) won the title by 25 points from Arden's Luiz Razia, with Lotus GP's Esteban Gutiérrez third.

For the 2012 season, Team Lazarus replaced Super Nova Racing using the name "Venezuela GP Lazarus". Lotus ART was renamed "Lotus Grand Prix", reflecting their increased relationship with title sponsor 'Lotus Cars'.

=== 2013 ===
The 2013 season contained eleven rounds, all of which supported the F1 World Championship. The series started on March 23 in Malaysia and concluded in Abu Dhabi on November 3.

Fabio Leimer won the title driving for Racing Engineering, with a total of 201 points and 3 wins. Sam Bird, driving for Russian Time, finished runner-up. The season was originally proposed to be the final season for the GP2/11 chassis introduced in 2011, but the series organisers decided to use this chassis for a further three seasons to keep costs down.

=== 2014 ===
The 2014 GP2 Series contained eleven rounds, all of which supported the F1 World Championship. The series started on April 5 in Bahrain and concluded in Abu Dhabi on November 23.

Jolyon Palmer won the title in Sochi driving for DAMS. Stoffel Vandoorne, driving for ART Grand Prix, finished runner-up in Abu Dhabi.

=== 2015 ===
The 2015 season contained eleven rounds, supporting the F1 World Championship and the final round of the World Endurance Championship at the 6 Hours of Bahrain. It started in Bahrain on 18 April and finished in Abu Dhabi on 29 November.

While still continuing to use the Dallara GP2/11 chassis introduced in 2011, this season saw the series introduce the Drag Reduction System (DRS) used in Formula One. The series used the same detection and activation points at each circuit as Formula One, and followed the same rules for activation, requiring drivers to be within one second of the car in front at the detection point for DRS to become available.

Stoffel Vandoorne won the title in Sochi driving for ART Grand Prix. Alexander Rossi, driving for Racing Engineering, finished runner-up.

=== 2016 ===
The 2016 season contained eleven rounds, supporting the F1 World Championship. It started in Spain on May 14 and finished in Abu Dhabi on November 27. It was also again proposed to be the final season for the Dallara GP2/11 chassis package that débuted in 2011 and the Mecachrome 4.0 litre (244 cu in) V8 naturally-aspirated engine package that débuted in the series' first season in 2005 before a brand new chassis and engine package was introduced for the 2017 season, but due to another cost-cutting, the series organisers decided to use the current chassis and engine package for a further season.

Pierre Gasly won the title driving for Prema Racing (who won the team's championship in their debut season). Antonio Giovinazzi, also driving for Prema, finished runner up.

== Television rights ==
The television rights are held by Formula One Management, which also manages the rights to Formula One.

Sky Sports F1 broadcast every race live in the UK and Ireland, while Setanta Sports also broadcast in Ireland.

The races were also broadcast in the United States on Comcast's NBC Sports Network, while in Brazil it is broadcast by cable TV channel SportTV. In Venezuela MeridianoTV broadcast, and in the rest of Latin America, the races from 2012 were shown on delay in South Cone and live in North Cone on Fox Sports +.

Other European countries: In Spain, races were broadcast by MarcaTV, Antena 3 and TV3. In Germany, PayTV Channel Sky broadcast all races live, and in Finland Pay-TV-channel MTV3 MAX broadcast all races and qualifying live. RAI broadcast only the races.

In the UK, races were being shown on Setanta Sports until the channel ceased broadcasting in June 2009. Setanta took up coverage of the series from ITV, who had shown GP2 in all four seasons to date (highlights only for 2005–2007, live coverage for 2008). However, by the German GP, Setanta GB had gone into administration so UK viewers could have been left without a GP2 broadcaster, but British Eurosport subsequently picked up the UK rights to GP2 for the next two and a half years. Setanta Ireland continues to operate for the Irish market and retains GP2 rights for that country. In February 2012, it was announced that Sky Sports F1 had secured the broadcasting rights to the GP2 series and will broadcast every race live in the United Kingdom and Ireland. Formula One pundit Will Buxton provided commentary for the UK broadcast until he departed at the end of the 2014 season and was succeeded by Alex Jacques.

== Circuits ==
Number	Countries, rounds	Circuits	Years
1	(Italy) Imola GP2 round	Imola Circuit	2005–2006
2	(Spain) Catalunya GP2 round	Circuit de Barcelona-Catalunya	2005–2016
3	Monaco GP2 round	Circuit de Monaco	2005–2016
4	(Germany) Nürburgring GP2 round	Nürburgring	2005–2007, 2009, 2011, 2013
5	(France) Magny-Cours GP2 round	Circuit de Nevers Magny-Cours	2005–2008
6	(United Kingdom) Silverstone GP2 round	Silverstone Circuit	2005–2016
7	(Germany) Hockenheimring GP2 round	Hockenheimring	2005–2006, 2008, 2010, 2012, 2014, 2016
8	(Hungary) Hungaroring GP2 round	Hungaroring	2005–2016
9	(Turkey) Istanbul Park GP2 round	Istanbul Park	2005–2011
10	(Italy) Monza GP2 round	Autodromo Nazionale di Monza	2005–2016
11	(Belgium) Spa-Francorchamps GP2 round	Circuit de Spa-Francorchamps	2005, 2007–2016
12	Bahrain GP2 round	Bahrain International Circuit	2005, 2007, 2012–2015
13	(Spain) Valencia GP2 round	Circuit Ricardo Tormo	2006–2007
14	(Spain) Valencia GP2 round	Valencia Street Circuit	2008–2012
15	(Portugal) Algarve GP2 round	Algarve International Circuit	2009
16	(United Arab Emirates) Yas Marina GP2 round	Yas Marina Circuit	2010–2011, 2013–2016
17	(Malaysia) Sepang GP2 round	Sepang International Circuit	2012–2013, 2016
18	(Singapore) Marina Bay GP2 round	Marina Bay Street Circuit	2012–2013
19	(Austria) Red Bull Ring GP2 round	Red Bull Ring	2014–2016
20	(Russia) Sochi GP2 round	Sochi Autodrom	2014–2015
21	(Azerbaijan) Baku GP2 round	Baku City Circuit	2016

== See also ==
- List of GP2 Series drivers
- List of GP2 Series race winners
- List of GP2 Series driver records
- GP2 Asia Series
- 2011 GP2 Final
- GP3 Series
- Formula One
- Formula Two
- FIA Formula Two Championship (2009–2012)
- FIA Formula 2 Championship
- Formula Three
- Formula 3000

== Notes ==
Awards
Preceded by SAFER barrier	Autosport; Pioneering and Innovation Award; 2005	Succeeded by Audi R10
