= Silverstone Formula 2 round =

(United Kingdom) Silverstone Formula 2 round
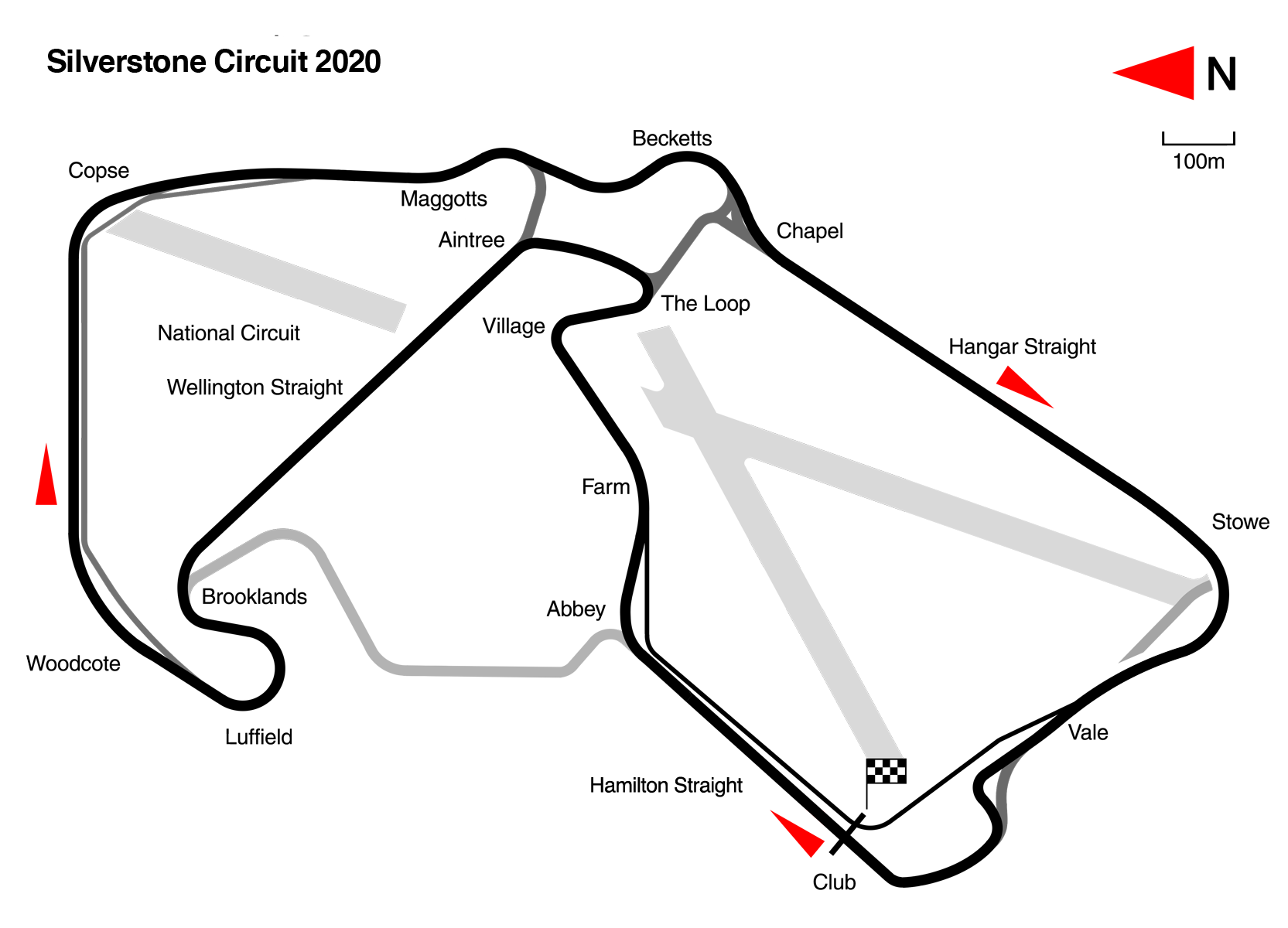

FIA Formula 2 Championship
- Venue: Silverstone Circuit
- Location: Silverstone, United Kingdom
- First race: 2017
- Most wins (driver): (Bulgaria) Nikola Tsolov (2)
- Most wins (team): (United Kingdom) Virtuosi Racing (Italy) Prema Racing (France) DAMS (Spain) Campos Racing (4)

Circuit information
- Length: 5.891 km (3.660 mi)
- Lap record: 1:39.993 ( (United Kingdom) Jack Aitken, Dallara F2 2018, 2019)

The Silverstone Formula 2 round is a FIA Formula 2 Championship series race that is run on the Silverstone Circuit in the United Kingdom.

== Winners ==
Year	Race	Driver	Team	Report
2017	Feature	(Monaco) Charles Leclerc	Prema Racing	Report
2017	Sprint	(Canada) Nicholas Latifi	DAMS	Report
2018	Feature	(Thailand) Alex Albon	DAMS	Report
2018	Sprint	(Germany) Maximilian Günther	BWT Arden	Report
2019	Feature	(Italy) Luca Ghiotto	UNI-Virtuosi	Report
2019	Sprint	(United Kingdom) Jack Aitken	Campos Racing	Report
2020	Feature	(Russia) Nikita Mazepin	Hitech Grand Prix	Report
2020	Sprint	(United Kingdom) Dan Ticktum	DAMS	Report
2020	Feature	(United Kingdom) Callum Ilott	UNI-Virtuosi	Report
2020	Sprint	(Japan) Yuki Tsunoda	Carlin	Report
2021	Sprint 1	(Russia) Robert Shwartzman	Prema Racing	Report
2021	Sprint 2	(Netherlands) Richard Verschoor	MP Motorsport	Report
2021	Feature	(China) Guanyu Zhou	UNI-Virtuosi	Report
2022	Sprint	(Australia) Jack Doohan	Virtuosi Racing	Report
2022	Feature	(United States) Logan Sargeant	Carlin	Report
2023	Sprint	(Denmark) Frederik Vesti	Prema Racing	Report
2023	Feature	(France) Victor Martins	ART Grand Prix	Report
2024	Sprint	(Italy) Kimi Antonelli	Prema Racing	Report
2024	Feature	(France) Isack Hadjar	Campos Racing	Report
2025	Sprint	(Italy) Leonardo Fornaroli	Invicta Racing	Report
2025	Feature	(United States) Jak Crawford	DAMS Lucas Oil	Report
2026	Sprint	(Bulgaria) Nikola Tsolov	Campos Racing	Report
2026	Feature	(Bulgaria) Nikola Tsolov	Campos Racing	Report

== See also ==
- British Grand Prix
- 70th Anniversary Grand Prix
- Silverstone GP2 round
