= Sepang International Circuit =

Motorsport race track in Sepang, Selangor, Malaysia

Petronas Sepang International Circuit
- Circuit logo (November 2023–present)

- Grand Prix Circuit (1999–present)
- Location: Sepang, Selangor, Malaysia
- Coordinates: 2°45′38″N 101°44′15″E
- Capacity: 130,000
- FIA Grade: 1 (Grand Prix); 2 (North)
- Broke ground: 1 November 1997; 29 years ago
- Opened: 7 March 1999; 27 years ago
- Architect: Hermann Tilke
- Former names: Sepang International Circuit (March 1999–October 2023)
- Major events: Current: Formula One; Bahrain Grand Prix in Malaysia (2026); Malaysian Grand Prix (1999–2017); Grand Prix motorcycle racing Malaysian motorcycle Grand Prix (1999–2019, 2022–present); GT World Challenge Asia (2017–2019, 2022–present); TCR Asia (2015–2019, 2024–present); Asia Road Racing Championship (2003–2015, 2019–2020, 2022–present); Sepang 1000 km (2009–2019, 2021–present); Future: Super GT (2002, 2004–2013, 2025, 2027); Former: Asian Le Mans Series; 4 Hours of Sepang (2013–2020, 2023–2025); WTCR Race of Malaysia (2019); FIM EWC (2019); World SBK (2014–2016); Formula Nippon (2004)
- Website: https://www.sepangcircuit.com/home

Grand Prix Circuit (1999–present)
- Length: 5.543 km (3.444 mi)
- Turns: 15
- Race lap record: 1:34.080 ( (Germany) Sebastian Vettel, Ferrari SF70H, 2017, F1)

North Circuit (1999–present)
- Length: 2.706 km (1.681 mi)
- Turns: 9
- Race lap record: 0:59.761 ( (New Zealand) Earl Bamber, Tatuus FRV6, 2008, FR 3.5)

South Circuit (1999–present)
- Length: 2.609 km (1.621 mi)
- Turns: 8

Sepang International Circuit Sdn Bhd
- Type: Government-linked company
- Founded: 1997; 29 years ago
- Headquarters: Jalan Pekeliling, 64000 Sepang, Selangor, Malaysia
- Key people: Datin Anita Azrina Abdul Aziz; Azhan Shafriman Hanif, Chief Executive Officer
- Parent: Minister of Finance (Incorporated)
- Website: www.sepangcircuit.com

Sepang International Circuit (/səˈpæŋ/ sə-PANG, Malay pronunciation: [ˈsəpaŋ]; abbr. SIC, Malay: Litar Antarabangsa Sepang), known as Petronas Sepang International Circuit for commercial reasons, is a 5.543 km (3.444 mi) motorsport race track in Sepang, Selangor, Malaysia. It is located approximately 45 km (28 mi) south of Kuala Lumpur, close to Kuala Lumpur International Airport. It hosted the Formula One Malaysian Grand Prix from 1999 to 2017 and a relocated Bahrain Grand Prix in 2026, and is also the venue for the Malaysian Motorcycle Grand Prix, the Malaysia Merdeka Endurance Race, and other major motorsport events.

Previously known as the Sepang F1 Circuit, it was renamed the Sepang International Circuit. On 31 October 2023, it was announced that Petronas has acquired the naming rights to the circuit for three years in an undisclosed fee. On 26 July 2026, it was announced that Sepang would return to the Formula One calendar as the host of the 2026 Bahrain Grand Prix, to be named the "Gulf Air Bahrain Grand Prix in Malaysia 2026", after the conflict in the Middle East rendered Bahrain unsafe to host the race. Bahrain will retain all ticket pricing rights and race proceeds.

== History ==
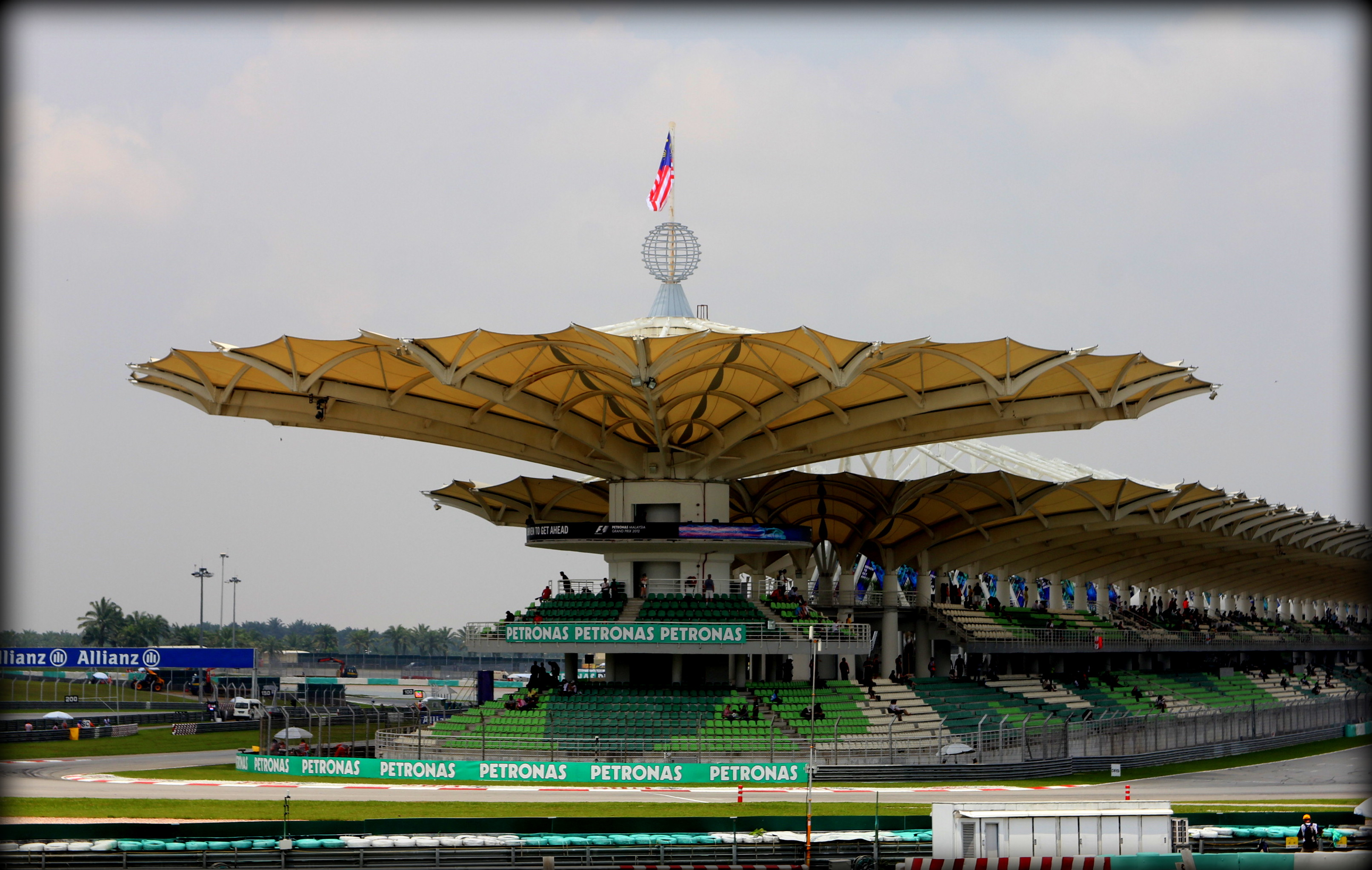
Sepang International Circuit grandstand, and its iconic umbrella shade.

The circuit was designed by German designer Hermann Tilke, who would subsequently design circuits including in Shanghai, Sakhir, Istanbul, Marina Bay, and Yas Marina. As part of a series of major infrastructure projects in the 1990s in Malaysia, the Sepang International Circuit was constructed between 1997 and 1999 close to Putrajaya, the then-newly founded administrative capital of the country, with the intent of hosting the Malaysian Grand Prix. The Malaysian climate means the circuit is known for its unpredictable humid tropical weather, varying from clear hot days to tropical rain-storms.

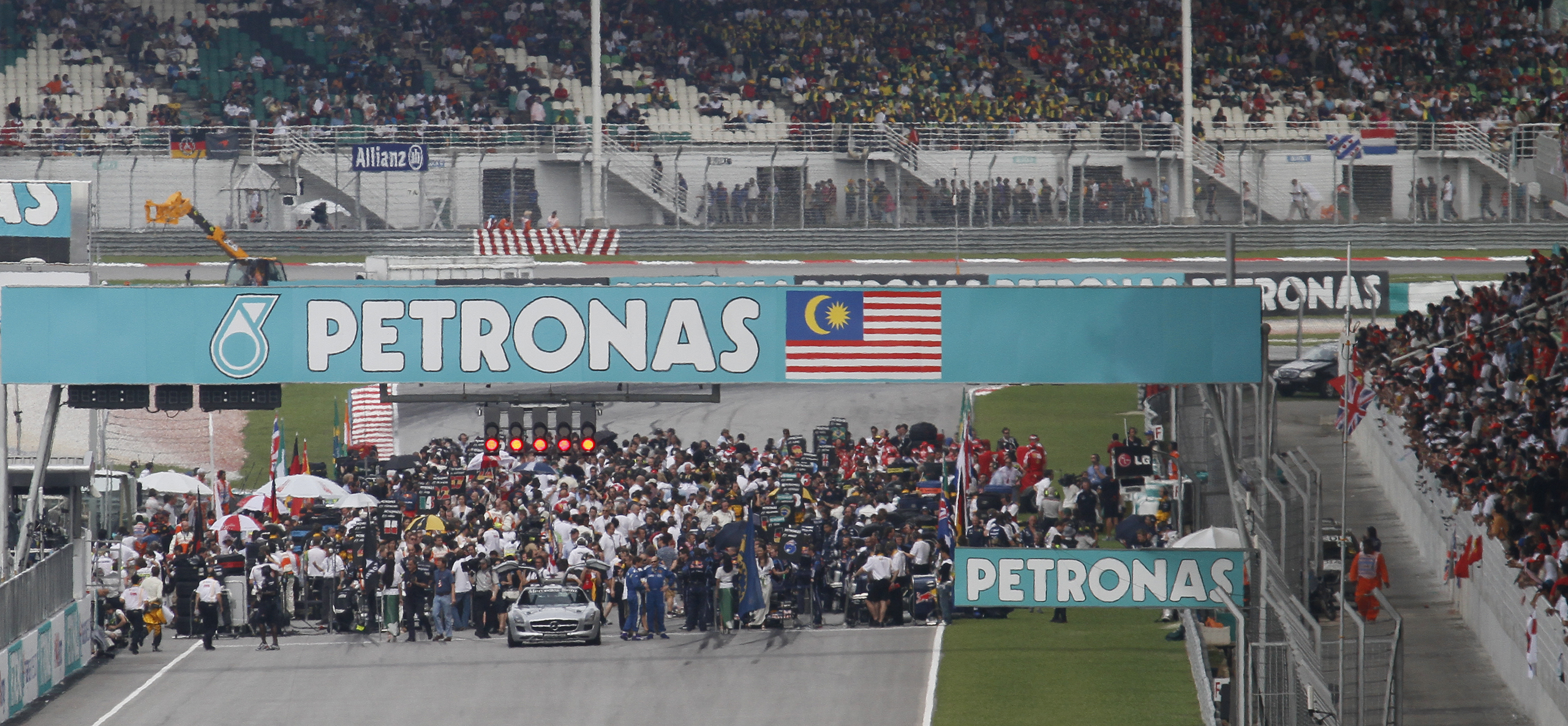
Petronas sponsored the Formula One Malaysian Grand Prix as the title sponsor since its inaugural race in 1999.

The circuit was officially inaugurated on 7 March 1999 at 20:30 MST (UTC+08:00).

On 23 October 2011, on the second lap of the MotoGP Shell Advance Malaysian Grand Prix, the Italian motorcycle racer Marco Simoncelli died following a crash in turn 11 on Lap 2, resulting in an abandonment of the race.

The track was completely resurfaced in 2016 with the support of Italian designers Dromo, with several corners reprofiled to emphasize mechanical, rather than aerodynamic grip. Notably, the final corner was raised by approximately 1 meter, which officials claimed would force drivers to take a later apex and explore different racing lines through the hairpin. In October 2016, it was rumoured that the Sepang circuit may be dropped from the Formula One calendar due to dwindling ticket sales, and held its nineteenth and last World Championship Grand Prix in 2017. The race's contract was due to expire in 2018, but its future had been under threat due to rising hosting fees and declining ticket sales.

In July 2026, SIC announced that Malaysia would host the 2026 Bahrain Grand Prix, officially titled the "Formula 1 Gulf Air Bahrain Grand Prix in Malaysia", from 2 to 4 October. Reports indicated that Bahrain would cover most of the rescheduling costs. The Grand Prix had originally been scheduled to take place at the Bahrain International Circuit in April, but its original date was called off because of the 2026 Iran war before the event was relocated to Sepang. The 2026 Saudi Arabian Grand Prix, which had been called off at the same time, remained cancelled.

== Layout ==
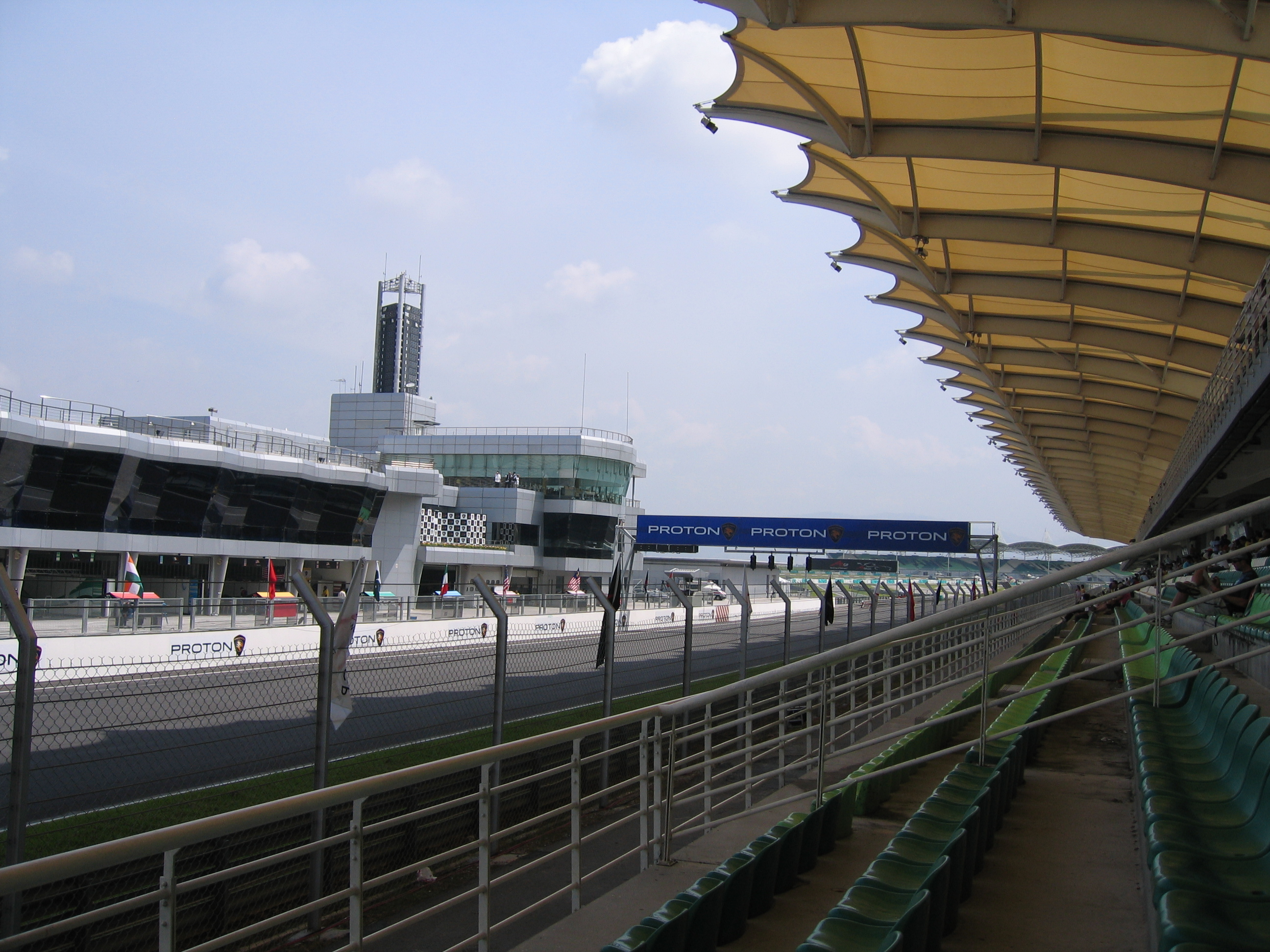
View from Mall Area, Main Grandstand North, Lower Tier.

The main circuit, normally raced in a clockwise direction, is 5.543 km (3.444 mi) long, and is noted for its sweeping corners and wide straights from 16–22 m (52–72 ft). The layout is quite unusual, with a 0.927 km (0.576 mi) long back straight separated from the pit straight by just one very tight hairpin.

Other configurations of the Sepang circuit can also be used. The north circuit is also raced in a clockwise direction. It is basically the first half of the main circuit. The course turns back towards the pit straight after turn 6 and is 2.706 km (1.681 mi) long in total.

The south circuit is the other half of the racecourse. The back straight of the main circuit becomes the pit straight when the south circuit is in use, and joins onto turn 8 of the main circuit to form a hairpin turn. Also run clockwise, this circuit is 2.609 km (1.621 mi) in length.

Sepang International Circuit also features kart racing and motocross facilities.

=== Track configurations ===
Sepang International Circuit layout configurations
Grand Prix Circuit (1999–present)

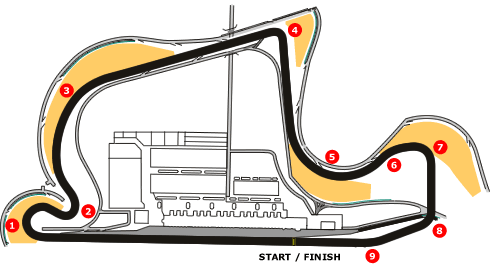
North Circuit (1999–present)

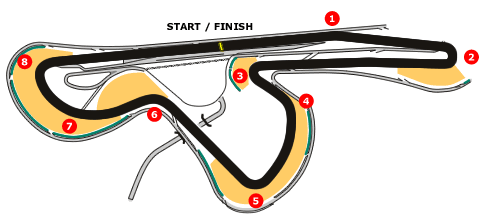
South Circuit (1999–present)

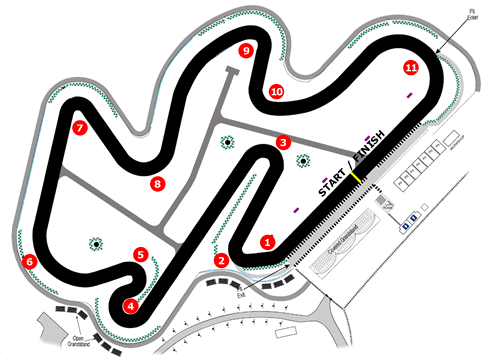
Kart Circuit (1999–present)

== A lap in a Formula One car ==
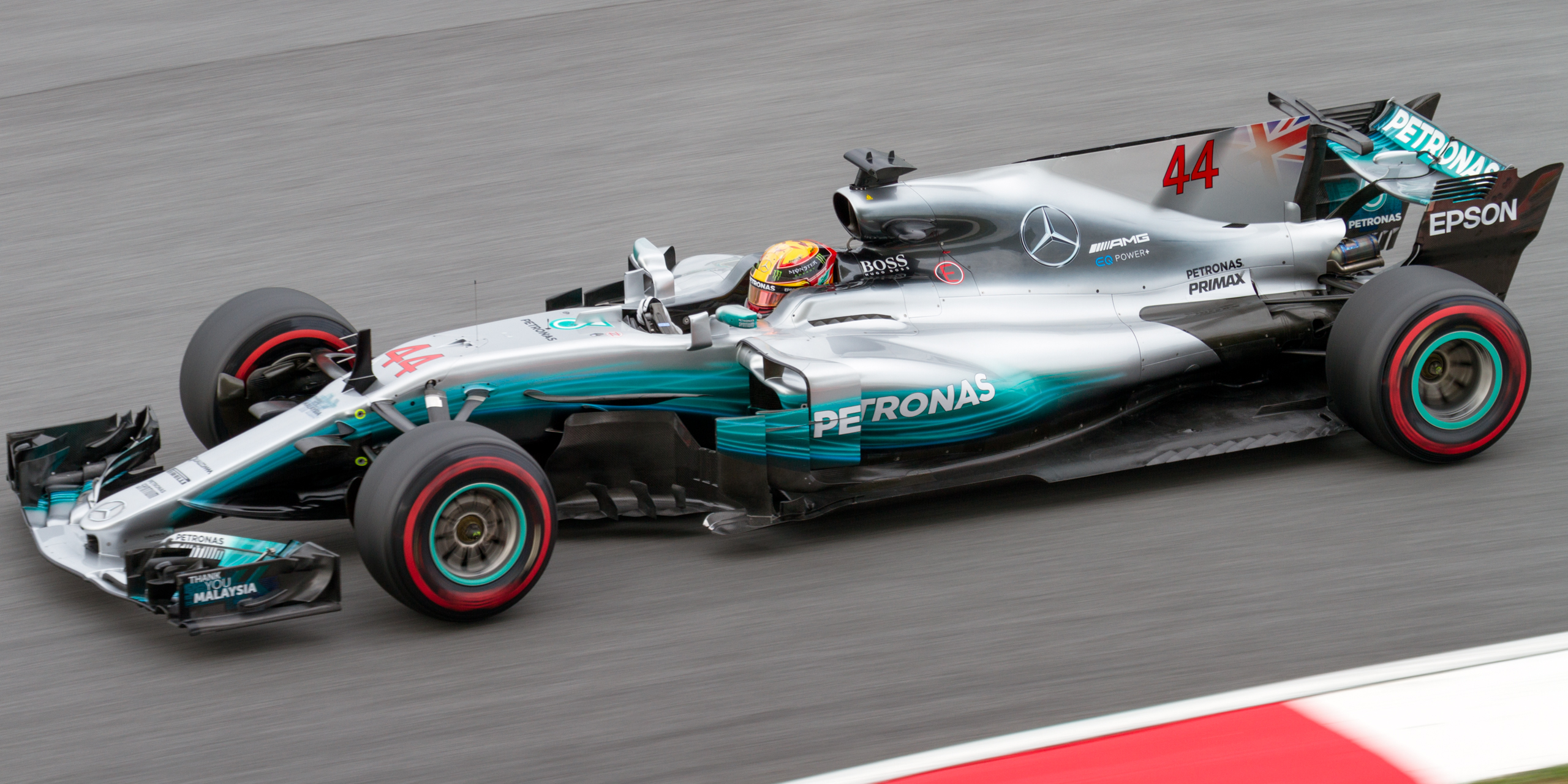
Lewis Hamilton during the 2017 Malaysian Grand Prix.

Sepang starts with a long pit straight where the DRS zone exists – crucial for drivers to get a good exit out of the last corner to gain as much speed as possible. Turn 1 is a very long, slow corner taken in second gear. Most drivers brake incredibly late and lose speed gradually as they file round the corner, similar to Shanghai's first turn but slower. Turn 1 leads straight into Turn 2, a tight left hairpin which goes downhill quite significantly. The first two corners are quite bumpy, making it hard to put power onto the track. Turn 3 is a long flat out right hander which leads into Turn 4 – known locally as the Langkawi Curve – a second gear, right-angle right-hander. Turns 5 and 6 make up an incredibly high-speed, long chicane that hurts tyres and puts a lot of stress on drivers due to high G-Force. It is locally known as the Genting Curve. Turns 7 and 8 (the KLIA curve) make up a long, medium-speed, double-apex right hander, and a bump can cause the car to lose balance here. Turn 9 is a very slow left-hand hairpin (the Berjaya Tioman Corner), similar to turn two but uphill. Turn 10 leads into a challenging, medium-speed right hander at turn 11, requiring braking and turning simultaneously. Turn 12 is a flat-out, bumpy left which immediately leads into the flat right at turn 13, then the challenging 'Sunway Lagoon' curve at turn 14. Similar to turn 11, it requires hard-braking and steering at the same time. It is taken in second gear. The long back straight can be a good place for drivers to overtake as they brake hard into turn 15, a left-handed, second-geared hairpin but drivers are advised by experts to be careful not to get re-overtaken as they come into turn 1.

== Events ==
Current

- April: GT World Challenge Asia, Asia Road Racing Championship, Lamborghini Super Trofeo Asia
- August: Porsche Carrera Cup Asia, Thailand Super Series, Moto4 Asia Cup
- September: Asia Road Racing Championship
- October: Formula One Bahrain Grand Prix in Malaysia
- November: Grand Prix motorcycle racing Malaysian motorcycle Grand Prix, Moto4 Asia Cup, Sepang 1000 km, China GT Championship
- December: Sepang 12 Hours, TCR Asia Series, TCR China Touring Car Championship

Future

- Formula Regional Asian Championship (2018–2020, 2027)
- Super GT (2002, 2004–2013, 2025, 2027)

Former

- 24H Series Middle East
  - 12H Malaysia (2025)
- A1 Grand Prix (2005–2008)
- Asian Formula Renault (2004–2008, 2014–2015, 2017–2019)
- Asian Le Mans Series
  - 4 Hours of Sepang (2013–2020, 2023–2025)
- Asian Le Mans Sprint Cup (2016–2017)
- Asian Touring Car Series (2000–2011)
- Aston Martin Asia Cup (2008–2009)
- Audi R8 LMS Cup (2013–2019)
- F3 Asian Championship (2018–2020)
- Ferrari Challenge Asia-Pacific (2011–2017, 2019)
- FIM Endurance World Championship
  - 8 Hours of Sepang (2019)
- Formula 4 Australian Championship (2024)
- Formula 4 South East Asia Championship (2016–2019, 2023, 2025)
- Formula Asia (2000–2001)
- Formula Masters China (2011–2017)
- Formula Nippon (2004)
- Formula One
  - Malaysian Grand Prix (1999–2017)
- GP2 Asia Series
  - Sepang GP2 Asia round (2008–2009)
- GP2 Series
  - Sepang GP2 round (2012–2013, 2016)
- GP3 Series (2016)
- Intercontinental GT Challenge
  - Sepang 12 Hours (2016)
- JK Racing Asia Series (2006–2012)
- Lamborghini Super Trofeo World Final (2014)
- Porsche Carrera Cup Australia (2017)
- Porsche Sprint Challenge Indonesia (2025)
- Speedcar Series (2008)
- Superbike World Championship (2014–2016)
- Supersport World Championship (2014–2016)
- TCR International Series (2015–2016)
- TCR Malaysia Touring Car Championship (2019–2020)
- World Touring Car Cup
  - FIA WTCR Race of Malaysia (2019)

== Lap records ==
The official lap record for the Sepang International Circuit is 1:34.080, set by Sebastian Vettel during the 2017 Malaysian Grand Prix. As of November 2026, the fastest official race lap records at the Sepang International Circuit are listed as:

Category	Time	Driver	Vehicle	Event
Grand Prix Circuit (1999–present): 5.543 km (3.444 mi)
Formula One	1:34.080	Sebastian Vettel	Ferrari SF70H	2017 Malaysian Grand Prix
GP2	1:45.066	Sergio Canamasas	Dallara GP2/11	2016 Sepang GP2 Series round
GP2 Asia	1:46.405	Romain Grosjean	Dallara GP2/05	2008 Malaysian GP2 Asia Series round
A1GP	1:48.550	Neel Jani	A1GP Powered by Ferrari	2008 Sepang A1GP round
GP3	1:51.520	Antonio Fuoco	Dallara GP3/16	2016 Sepang GP3 Series round
LMP2	1:52.991	Louis Delétraz	Oreca 07	2023 4 Hours of Sepang
Super GT (GT500)	1:54.127	Yuji Kunimoto	Toyota GR Supra GT500	2025 Super GT Sepang 300 km
MotoGP	1:58.873	Álex Márquez	Ducati Desmosedici GP24	2025 Malaysian motorcycle Grand Prix
Formula Renault 3.5	1:59.153	James Grunwell	Tatuus FRV6	2008 2nd Sepang Formula V6 Asia round
LMP3	2:00.525	Josh Burdon	Ligier JS P3	2018 4 Hours of Sepang
Formula Regional	2:01.151	Yifei Ye	Tatuus F3 T-318	2019 2nd Sepang F3 Asia Winter Series round
World SBK	2:03.637	Tom Sykes	Kawasaki ZX-10R	2016 Sepang World SBK round
GT3	2:03.659	Christopher Haase	Audi R8 LMS GT3 EVO II	2024 Sepang 12 Hours
Formula Renault 2.0	2:03.747	Bruno Carneiro	Tatuus FR2.0/13	2019 1st Sepang Asian Formula Renault round
Super GT (GT300)	2:04.081	Shunji Okumoto	Mercedes-AMG GT3 Evo	2025 Super GT Sepang 300 km
Moto2	2:04.422	David Alonso	Kalex Moto2	2026 Malaysian motorcycle Grand Prix
Lamborghini Super Trofeo	2:04.695	Afiq Ikhwan Yazid	Lamborghini Huracán Super Trofeo	2017 Sepang Lamborghini Super Trofeo Asia round
Formula Abarth	2:05.765	Taylor Cockerton	Tatuus FA010	2017 1st Sepang Formula Masters China round
500cc	2:06.618	Valentino Rossi	Honda NSR500	2001 Malaysian motorcycle Grand Prix
CN	2:07.113	Kurt Hill	Ligier JS53	2017 2nd Sepang Asian Le Mans Sprint Cup round
Porsche Carrera Cup	2:07.595	Martin Ragginger	Porsche 911 (991 II) GT3 Cup	2019 Sepang Porsche Carrera Cup Asia round
250cc	2:07.597	Hiroshi Aoyama	Honda RS250RW	2009 Malaysian motorcycle Grand Prix
Formula 4	2:08.301	Rashid Al Dhaheri	Tatuus F4-T421	2023 2nd Sepang F4 SEA round
World SSP	2:09.178	Kev Coghlan	Yamaha YZF-R6	2014 Sepang World SSP round
Formula Nippon	2:09.302	Richard Lyons	Lola B03/51	2004 Sepang Formula Nippon round
Ferrari Challenge	2:09.394	Philippe Prette	Ferrari 488 Challenge	2017 Sepang Ferrari Challenge Asia–Pacific round
LM GTE	2:09.990	Akira Iida	Ferrari 458 Italia GT2	2013 3 Hours of Sepang
Moto3	2:10.967	Álvaro Carpe	KTM RC250GP	2026 Malaysian motorcycle Grand Prix
Formula BMW	2:11.139	Richard Bradley	Mygale FB02	2010 1st Sepang Formula BMW Pacific round
Stock car racing	2:12.234	Jean Alesi	Speedcar V8	2008 Malaysian Speedcar Series round
125cc	2:13.118	Álvaro Bautista	Aprilia RS125R	2006 Malaysian motorcycle Grand Prix
GT4	2:13.998	Todd Kingsford	Porsche 718 Cayman GT4 RS Clubsport	2025 Sepang Porsche Sprint Challenge Indonesia round
Asian Formula 2000	2:14.410	Parthiva Sureshwaren	Argo Formula Asia	2000 Sepang Asian Formula 2000 round
N-GT	2:14.461	Hideo Fukuyama	Porsche 911 (996) GT3 R	2000 TMTouch Japan GT Championship Malaysia
TCR Touring Car	2:16.338	Daniel Lloyd	Honda Civic Type R TCR (FK8)	2020 3rd Sepang TCR Malaysia round
Asia Productions 250	2:22.443	Rheza Danica Ahrens	Honda CBR250RR	2023 Sepang ARRC round
Super 2000	2:27.381	Charoensukawattana Nattavude	Peugeot 306 GTi	2000 Sepang ATCC round
Asia Underbone 150	2:32.953	Syafiq Rosli	Yamaha Y15 ZR	2024 Sepang ARRC round
North Circuit (1999–present): 2.706 km (1.681 mi)
Formula Renault 3.5	0:59.761	Earl Bamber	Tatuus FRV6	2008 1st Sepang Formula V6 Asia round

== Fatalities ==
- Marco Simoncelli – 2011 Malaysian Motorcycle Grand Prix
- Mohamad Izzat – 2013 Malaysian Super Series
- Amaluddin Abd Rahman – 2014 Malaysian Super Series
- Milton Poh – 2014 Malaysian Super Series
- Afridza Munandar – 2019 Sepang Asia Talent Cup round

== See also ==
- List of Formula One circuits
- List of sporting venues with a highest attendance of 100,000 or more
