= 2016 GP2 Series =

Season of Formula One feeder championship

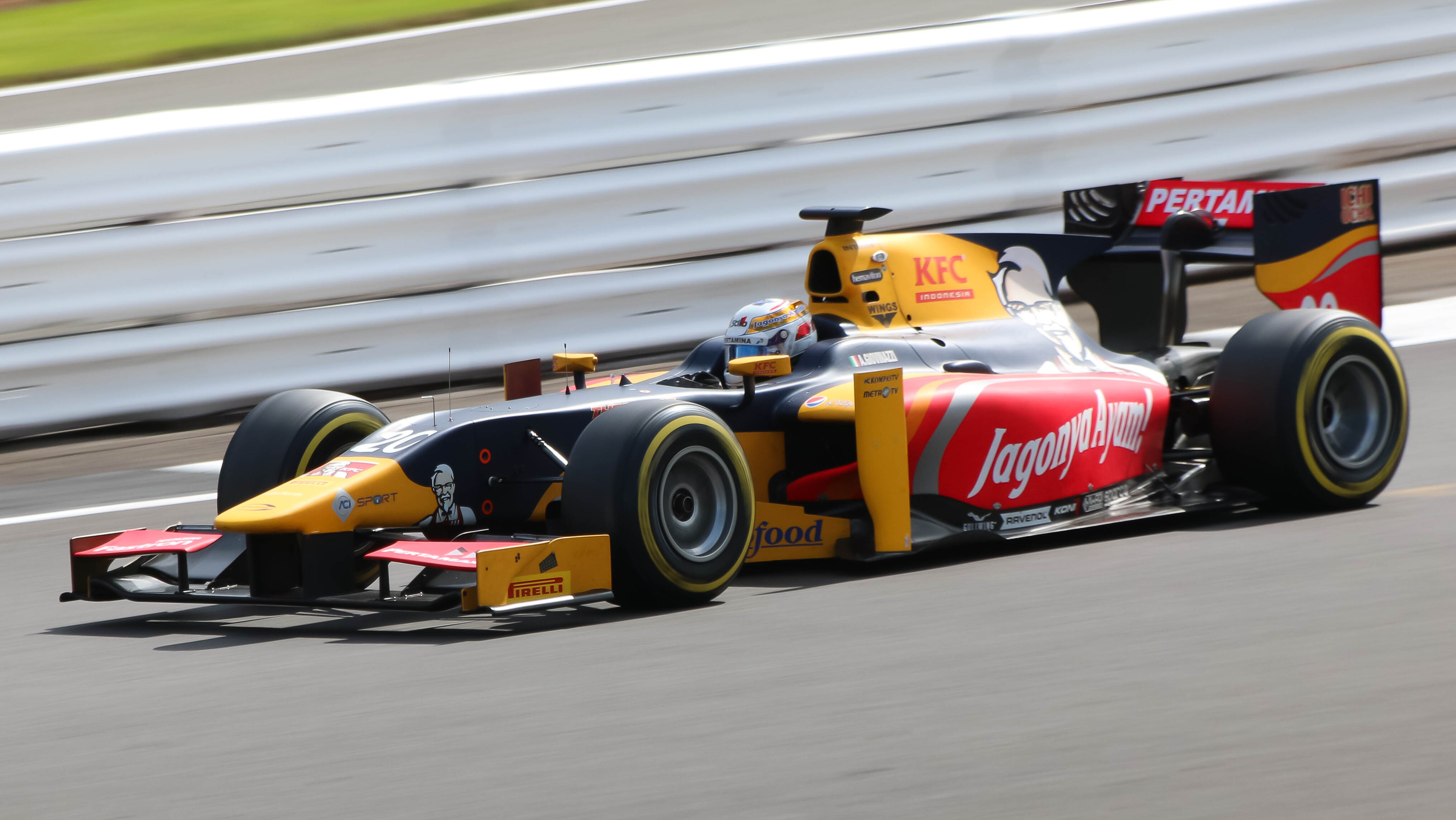
Prema Racing won the Teams' Championship

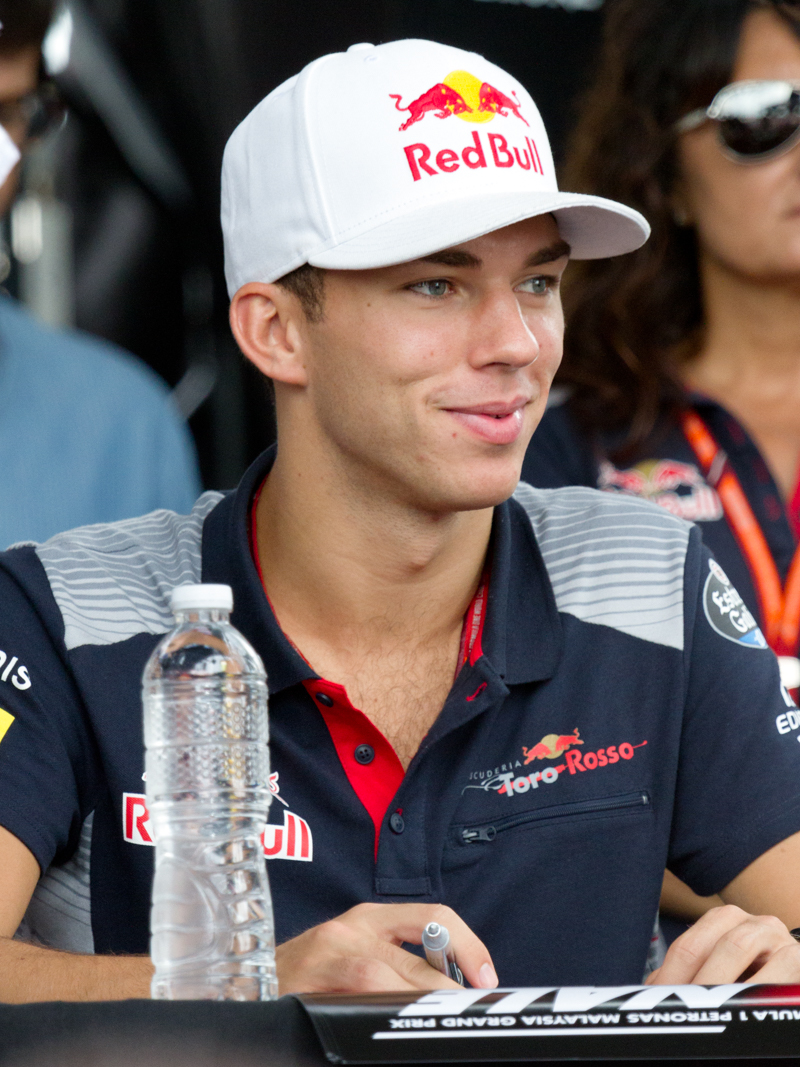
Pierre Gasly (pictured in 2017) won the championship

The 2016 GP2 Series season was the fiftieth season of the second-tier of Formula One feeder championship and also twelfth and final season under the GP2 Series moniker, a motor racing feeder series that was run in support of the 2016 FIA Formula One World Championship. It was the final season run under the "GP2 Series" name, with the championship being rebranded as the FIA Formula 2 Championship from 2017. It was also originally scheduled to be the final season for the Dallara GP2/11 chassis that was introduced in 2011 and the Mecachrome 4.0 litre V8 normally-aspirated engine package that débuted in the maiden season of the series in 2005 before a brand new chassis and engine package was introduced for 2017, however due to another cost-cutting, the series announced it would keep the current chassis and engine package for one more season.

ART Grand Prix started the season as the defending teams' champions after securing the title–their fourth in the championship–at the series' second visit to the Bahrain International Circuit in 2015. Prema Racing won the Teams' championship, their first in the series and first attempt, while Pierre Gasly won the Drivers' championship.

Pierre Gasly took 4 race wins and the championship. The most races were won by Gasly’s teammate Antonio Giovinazzi, who took 5 victories, Sergey Sirotkin took victories at Mogyoród in the sprint race, and in Hockenheim - he took pole position and won the race. Alex Lynn got 3 sprint races wins, Racing Engineering drivers Jordan King and Norman Nato took 2 race wins each, and Luca Ghiotto, Artem Markelov, Mitch Evans and Nobuharu Matsushita each got 1 race win.

== Teams and drivers ==
Team	No.	Driver name	Rounds
(France) ART Grand Prix	1	(Japan) Nobuharu Matsushita	1–3, 5–11
(France) ART Grand Prix	1	(Austria) René Binder	4
(France) ART Grand Prix	2	(Russia) Sergey Sirotkin	All
(Spain) Racing Engineering	3	(France) Norman Nato	All
(Spain) Racing Engineering	4	(United Kingdom) Jordan King	All
(France) DAMS	5	(United Kingdom) Alex Lynn	All
(France) DAMS	6	(Canada) Nicholas Latifi	All
(Indonesia) Pertamina Campos Racing (Note: Pertamina Campos Racing competed under a Spanish licence in round 1 and an Indonesian licence for the rest of the season.)	7	(New Zealand) Mitch Evans	All
(Indonesia) Pertamina Campos Racing	8	(Indonesia) Sean Gelael	All
(Russia) Russian Time	9	(Italy) Raffaele Marciello	All
(Russia) Russian Time	10	(Russia) Artem Markelov	All
(Italy) Rapax	11	(Sweden) Gustav Malja	All
(Italy) Rapax	12	(France) Arthur Pic	1–9
(Italy) Rapax	12	(Venezuela) Johnny Cecotto Jr. (Note: Cecotto competed under a state Venezuelan racing licence.)	10–11
(Italy) Trident	14	(Indonesia) Philo Paz Armand	All
(Italy) Trident	15	(Italy) Luca Ghiotto	All
(United Kingdom) Carlin	18	(Spain) Sergio Canamasas	1–6, 8–11
(United Kingdom) Carlin	18	(Austria) René Binder	7
(United Kingdom) Carlin	19	(Germany) Marvin Kirchhöfer	1–10
(United Kingdom) Carlin	19	(Switzerland) Louis Delétraz	11
(Italy) Prema Racing	20	(Italy) Antonio Giovinazzi	All
(Italy) Prema Racing	21	(France) Pierre Gasly	All
(Netherlands) MP Motorsport	22	(United Kingdom) Oliver Rowland	All
(Netherlands) MP Motorsport	23	(Netherlands) Daniël de Jong	All
(United Kingdom) Arden International	24	(Malaysia) Nabil Jeffri	All
(United Kingdom) Arden International	25	(Sweden) Jimmy Eriksson	1–9
(United Kingdom) Arden International	25	(United Kingdom) Emil Bernstorff	11

=== Team changes ===
- Lazarus left the series at the end of the 2015 season, with their place taken by Prema Racing.
- Hilmer Motorsport left the series at the end of the 2015 season. As no replacement team could be found, the grid was left at twenty-two cars.
- Status Grand Prix also left the series before the 2016 season due to not being able to find any well-budgeted drivers and also lack of sponsorship for their second season. With the demise of the team, there were no number #16 and #17 cars on the grid.

=== Driver changes ===
Changing teams

- Sergio Canamasas, who raced for MP Motorsport, Hilmer Motorsport and Daiko Team Lazarus in 2015, switched to Carlin.
- Mitch Evans and Sean Gelael, who drove for Russian Time and Carlin respectively in 2015, moved to Campos Racing.
- Pierre Gasly, who spent the 2015 season with DAMS, moved to newcomers Prema Racing.
- Nicholas Latifi, who took part in three rounds of the 2015 season with MP Motorsport, switched to a full-time seat with DAMS.
- Gustav Malja, who raced for Trident and Rapax in 2015, switched Formula Renault 3.5 Series to race full-time with Rapax.
- Raffaele Marciello, who raced for Trident in 2015, moved to Russian Time.
- Norman Nato, who raced for Arden International in 2015, switched to Racing Engineering.
- Arthur Pic, who raced for Campos in 2014 and 2015, switched to Rapax.
- Oliver Rowland, who previously raced part-time for MP Motorsport and Status Grand Prix, is contesting the full season with MP Motorsport, with backing from Renault.
- Sergey Sirotkin, who finished third in 2015, moved from Rapax to defending champions ART Grand Prix.

Entering GP2

- 2015 Formula Renault 3.5 Series competitor Philo Paz Armand joined the series with Trident.
- GP3 Series race winner Jimmy Eriksson made his series début with Arden International.
- 2015 GP3 runner-up Luca Ghiotto graduated to the series with Trident.
- 2015 European Formula 3 runner-up Antonio Giovinazzi made his début in the series with Prema Racing.
- Nabil Jeffri joined the series with Arden International.
- Marvin Kirchhöfer, who placed third in the 2014 and 2015 GP3 Series joined the series with Carlin.

Leaving GP2

- Nathanaël Berthon left Lazarus and the series to join the FIA World Endurance Championship with G-Drive Racing.
- Rene Binder left MP Motorsport to join Lotus in Formula V8 3.5 Series.
- Rio Haryanto left Campos Racing and the series to join Formula One team Manor Racing.
- André Negrão and Dean Stoneman left Arden and Carlin and the series to join the Indy Lights with Schmidt Peterson Motorsports and Andretti Autosport.
- Richie Stanaway and Marco Sørensen, who raced for Status Grand Prix and Carlin, left to join the FIA World Endurance Championship with Aston Martin Racing.
- 2015 season champion Stoffel Vandoorne left the series as the reigning champion is not permitted to continue competing in the series. He joined the Super Formula with Docomo Team Dandelion Racing.

Mid-season changes

- ART Grand Prix driver Nobuharu Matsushita was suspended for the fourth round of the season in Austria due to erratic driving at the previous event in Baku. He was replaced by René Binder. Binder later joined Carlin, replacing Sergio Canamasas.

== Calendar ==
On 4 March 2016, the full calendar was revealed with eleven rounds taking place.

Round		Circuit/Location	Country	Date	Supporting
1	Feature	Circuit de Barcelona-Catalunya, Montmeló	Spain	14 May	Spanish Grand Prix
1	Sprint	Circuit de Barcelona-Catalunya, Montmeló	Spain	15 May	Spanish Grand Prix
2	Feature	Circuit de Monaco, Monaco	Monaco	27 May	Monaco Grand Prix
2	Sprint	Circuit de Monaco, Monaco	Monaco	28 May	Monaco Grand Prix
3	Feature	Baku City Circuit, Baku	Azerbaijan	18 June	European Grand Prix
3	Sprint	Baku City Circuit, Baku	Azerbaijan	19 June	European Grand Prix
4	Feature	Red Bull Ring, Spielberg	Austria	2 July	Austrian Grand Prix
4	Sprint	Red Bull Ring, Spielberg	Austria	3 July	Austrian Grand Prix
5	Feature	Silverstone Circuit, Silverstone	United Kingdom	9 July	British Grand Prix
5	Sprint	Silverstone Circuit, Silverstone	United Kingdom	10 July	British Grand Prix
6	Feature	Hungaroring, Mogyoród	Hungary	23 July	Hungarian Grand Prix
6	Sprint	Hungaroring, Mogyoród	Hungary	24 July	Hungarian Grand Prix
7	Feature	Hockenheimring, Hockenheim	Germany	30 July	German Grand Prix
7	Sprint	Hockenheimring, Hockenheim	Germany	31 July	German Grand Prix
8	Feature	Circuit de Spa-Francorchamps, Stavelot	Belgium	27 August	Belgian Grand Prix
8	Sprint	Circuit de Spa-Francorchamps, Stavelot	Belgium	28 August	Belgian Grand Prix
9	Feature	Autodromo Nazionale Monza, Monza	Italy	3 September	Italian Grand Prix
9	Sprint	Autodromo Nazionale Monza, Monza	Italy	4 September	Italian Grand Prix
10	Feature	Sepang International Circuit, Sepang	Malaysia	1 October	Malaysian Grand Prix
10	Sprint	Sepang International Circuit, Sepang	Malaysia	2 October	Malaysian Grand Prix
11	Feature	Yas Marina Circuit, Abu Dhabi	United Arab Emirates	26 November	Abu Dhabi Grand Prix
11	Sprint	Yas Marina Circuit, Abu Dhabi	United Arab Emirates	27 November	Abu Dhabi Grand Prix

=== Calendar changes ===
- The series returned to the Hockenheimring in support of the German Grand Prix, and the Sepang International Circuit.
  - With the return to Germany, the second Bahrain round—which had filled in as a replacement event in 2015—was removed from the calendar.
- The rounds at the Bahrain International Circuit and the Sochi Autodrom were discontinued after the Bahrain and Russian Grands Prix were brought forward to the start of the Formula One season.
- The series made its début at the Baku City Circuit in support of the returning European Grand Prix.

== Results and standings ==
=== Season summary ===
Round		Circuit	Pole position	Fastest Lap	Winning driver	Winning team	Report
1	F	(Spain) Circuit de Barcelona-Catalunya	(France) Pierre Gasly	(France) Norman Nato	(France) Norman Nato	(Spain) Racing Engineering	Report
1	S	(Spain) Circuit de Barcelona-Catalunya		(France) Pierre Gasly	(United Kingdom) Alex Lynn	(France) DAMS	Report
2	F	Circuit de Monaco	(Russia) Sergey Sirotkin	(France) Pierre Gasly (Note: Pierre Gasly set the fastest lap, but did not finish in the top 10, so was ineligible to be the point-scorer for the fastest lap. Artem Markelov was the point-scorer instead for setting the fastest lap of those finishing in the top 10.)	(Russia) Artem Markelov	(Russia) Russian Time	Report
2	S	Circuit de Monaco		(Japan) Nobuharu Matsushita	(Japan) Nobuharu Matsushita	(France) ART Grand Prix	Report
3	F	(Azerbaijan) Baku City Circuit	(Italy) Antonio Giovinazzi	(Japan) Nobuharu Matsushita	(Italy) Antonio Giovinazzi	(Italy) Prema Racing	Report
3	S	(Azerbaijan) Baku City Circuit		(Italy) Antonio Giovinazzi	(Italy) Antonio Giovinazzi	(Italy) Prema Racing	Report
4	F	(Austria) Red Bull Ring	(Russia) Sergey Sirotkin	(New Zealand) Mitch Evans	(New Zealand) Mitch Evans	(Indonesia) Pertamina Campos Racing	Report
4	S	(Austria) Red Bull Ring		(France) Norman Nato (Note: Norman Nato set the fastest lap, but did not finish in the top 10, so was ineligible to be the point-scorer for the fastest lap. Jordan King was the point-scorer instead for setting the fastest lap of those finishing in the top 10.)	(United Kingdom) Jordan King	(Spain) Racing Engineering	Report
5	F	(United Kingdom) Silverstone Circuit	(France) Norman Nato	(New Zealand) Mitch Evans	(France) Pierre Gasly	(Italy) Prema Racing	Report
5	S	(United Kingdom) Silverstone Circuit		(Italy) Luca Ghiotto	(United Kingdom) Jordan King	(Spain) Racing Engineering	Report
6	F	(Hungary) Hungaroring	(France) Pierre Gasly	(United Kingdom) Oliver Rowland (Note: Oliver Rowland set the fastest lap, but did not finish in the top 10, so was ineligible to be the point-scorer for the fastest lap. Nobuharu Matsushita was the point-scorer instead for setting the fastest lap of those finishing in the top 10.)	(France) Pierre Gasly	(Italy) Prema Racing	Report
6	S	(Hungary) Hungaroring		(France) Pierre Gasly	(Russia) Sergey Sirotkin	(France) ART Grand Prix	Report
7	F	(Germany) Hockenheimring	(Russia) Sergey Sirotkin	(Russia) Sergey Sirotkin	(Russia) Sergey Sirotkin	(France) ART Grand Prix	Report
7	S	(Germany) Hockenheimring		(Russia) Artem Markelov (Note: Artem Markelov set the fastest lap, but did not finish in the top 10, so was ineligible to be the point-scorer for the fastest lap. Pierre Gasly was the point-scorer instead for setting the fastest lap of those finishing in the top 10.)	(United Kingdom) Alex Lynn	(France) DAMS	Report
8	F	(Belgium) Circuit de Spa-Francorchamps	(Italy) Antonio Giovinazzi	(Japan) Nobuharu Matsushita (Note: Nobuharu Matsushita set the fastest lap, but did not finish in the top 10, so was ineligible to be the point-scorer for the fastest lap. Artem Markelov was the point-scorer instead for setting the fastest lap of those finishing in the top 10.)	(France) Pierre Gasly	(Italy) Prema Racing	Report
8	S	(Belgium) Circuit de Spa-Francorchamps		(Italy) Antonio Giovinazzi	(Italy) Antonio Giovinazzi	(Italy) Prema Racing	Report
9	F	(Italy) Autodromo Nazionale Monza	(France) Pierre Gasly	(Italy) Luca Ghiotto	(Italy) Antonio Giovinazzi	(Italy) Prema Racing	Report
9	S	(Italy) Autodromo Nazionale Monza		(Russia) Artem Markelov	(France) Norman Nato	(Spain) Racing Engineering	Report
10	F	(Malaysia) Sepang International Circuit	(France) Pierre Gasly	(Japan) Nobuharu Matsushita (Note: Nobuharu Matsushita set the fastest lap, but did not finish in the top 10, so was ineligible to be the point-scorer for the fastest lap. Sergey Sirotkin was the point-scorer instead for setting the fastest lap of those finishing in the top 10.)	(Italy) Antonio Giovinazzi	(Italy) Prema Racing	Report
10	S	(Malaysia) Sepang International Circuit		(Spain) Sergio Canamasas (Note: Sergio Canamasas set the fastest lap, but did not finish in the top 10, so was ineligible to be the point-scorer for the fastest lap. Pierre Gasly was the point-scorer instead for setting the fastest lap of those finishing in the top 10.)	(Italy) Luca Ghiotto	(Italy) Trident	Report
11	F	(United Arab Emirates) Yas Marina Circuit	(France) Pierre Gasly	(Japan) Nobuharu Matsushita	(France) Pierre Gasly	(Italy) Prema Racing	Report
11	S	(United Arab Emirates) Yas Marina Circuit		(Italy) Luca Ghiotto (Note: Luca Ghiotto set the fastest lap, but did not finish in the top 10, so was ineligible to be the point-scorer for the fastest lap. Sergey Sirotkin was the point-scorer instead for setting the fastest lap of those finishing in the top 10.)	(United Kingdom) Alex Lynn	(France) DAMS	Report

=== Scoring system ===
Points were awarded to the top 10 classified finishers in the Feature race, and to the top 8 classified finishers in the Sprint race. The pole-sitter in the feature race also received four points, and two points were given to the driver who set the fastest lap inside the top ten in both the feature and sprint races. No extra points were awarded to the pole-sitter in the sprint race.

Feature race points

Position	**1st**	**2nd**	**3rd**	**4th**	**5th**	**6th**	**7th**	**8th**	**9th**	**10th**	**Pole**	**FL**
Points	25	18	15	12	10	8	6	4	2	1	4	2

Sprint race points

Points were awarded to the top 8 classified finishers.

Position	**1st**	**2nd**	**3rd**	**4th**	**5th**	**6th**	**7th**	**8th**	**FL**
Points	15	12	10	8	6	4	2	1	2

=== Drivers' championship ===
Pos.	Driver	CAT (Spain)		MON (Monaco)		BAK (Azerbaijan)		RBR (Austria)		SIL (United Kingdom)		HUN (Hungary)		HOC (Germany)		SPA (Belgium)		MNZ (Italy)		SEP (Malaysia)		YMC (United Arab Emirates)		Points
1	(France) Pierre Gasly	**3**	2	15	13	Ret	2	Ret	7	1	7	**1**	7	DSQ	6	1	4	**4**	2	**11**	3	**1**	9	219
2	(Italy) Antonio Giovinazzi	18	Ret	11	18	**1**	1	Ret	5	2	4	2	17†	8	Ret	**6**	1	1	3	1	4	5	6	211
3	(Russia) Sergey Sirotkin	Ret	11	**Ret**	Ret	2	3	**12**	6	18	21	3	1	**1**	2	9	16	14	Ret	2	Ret	4	3	159
4	(Italy) Raffaele Marciello	8	5	6	3	3	11	3	4	9	6	4	8	3	7	4	5	2	14	6	2	10	13	159
5	(France) Norman Nato	1	16	2	6	Ret	Ret	7	12	**7**	22†	7	3	Ret	18	Ret	8	5	1	3	Ret	6	5	136
6	(United Kingdom) Alex Lynn	6	1	4	5	Ret	9	11	3	16	14	12	Ret	7	1	3	10	12	5	4	12	8	1	124
7	(United Kingdom) Jordan King	7	3	Ret	16	12†	4	8	1	8	1	8	2	15	11	2	12	7	4	5	14	13	10	122
8	(Italy) Luca Ghiotto	Ret	12	Ret	14	9	12	4	9	5	2	17	Ret	2	4	7	3	6	Ret	7	1	11	19	111
9	(United Kingdom) Oliver Rowland	10	6	3	7	4	15†	6	2	3	3	11	6	5	5	10	6	9	9	12	8	Ret	11	107
10	(Russia) Artem Markelov	4	4	1	8	Ret	5	Ret	11	10	12	9	4	Ret	9	5	21†	10	10	DNS	13	3	7	97
11	(Japan) Nobuharu Matsushita	11	8	8	1	6	Ret	EX	EX	6	5	6	Ret	9	12	11	11	11	6	Ret	7	2	4	92
12	(New Zealand) Mitch Evans	12	14	5	4	5	Ret	1	8	4	13	10	5	Ret	10	16	13	8	Ret	8	6	15	8	90
13	(Sweden) Gustav Malja	9	10	14	12	10	Ret	13	16	22	19	13	14	6	8	8	2	3	7	9	5	Ret	14	53
14	(France) Arthur Pic	13	Ret	10	9	Ret	8	9	18	14	11	5	Ret	4	3	14	22†	Ret	11					36
15	(Indonesia) Sean Gelael	17	13	13	Ret	7	Ret	2	Ret	21	18	22	10	Ret	Ret	18	15	DSQ	16	16	Ret	Ret	21	24
16	(Canada) Nicholas Latifi	2	7	Ret	Ret	Ret	13	10	Ret	11	10	16	12	14	17	13	9	16	15	14	10	9	12	23
17	(Germany) Marvin Kirchhöfer	15	15	7	2	Ret	10	Ret	19	12	8	14	13	10	14	Ret	14	18	8	15	11			21
18	(Venezuela) Johnny Cecotto Jr.																			13	9	7	2	18
19	(Spain) Sergio Canamasas	5	9	12	10	Ret	6	Ret	10	13	9	18	9			12	7	Ret	13	10	15	12	16	17
20	(Sweden) Jimmy Eriksson	16	19	Ret	15	11†	Ret	5	13	15	17	21†	Ret	12	13	15	20	15	18†					10
21	(Netherlands) Daniël de Jong	14	17	9	11	8	14	14	20	19	16	15	11	Ret	16	17	17	17	19	17	Ret	14	Ret	6
22	(Malaysia) Nabil Jeffri	19	18	Ret	17	Ret	7	Ret	17	17	15	20	16	11	Ret	19	18	13	12	18	Ret	Ret	20	2
23	(Austria) René Binder							16	15					13	15									0
24	(Indonesia) Philo Paz Armand	Ret	Ret	16	Ret	Ret	Ret	15	14	20	20	19	15	16	Ret	20	19	19	17	19	Ret	16	18	0
25	(United Kingdom) Emil Bernstorff																					17	15	0
26	(Switzerland) Louis Delétraz																					Ret	17	0
Pos.	Driver	CAT (Spain)		MON (Monaco)		BAK (Azerbaijan)		RBR (Austria)		SIL (United Kingdom)		HUN (Hungary)		HOC (Germany)		SPA (Belgium)		MNZ (Italy)		SEP (Malaysia)		YMC (United Arab Emirates)		Points

Key
Colour	Result
Gold	Winner
Silver	2nd place
Bronze	3rd place
Green	Other points position
Blue	Other classified position
Blue	Not classified, finished (NC)
Purple	Not classified, retired (Ret)
Red	Did not qualify (DNQ)
Red	Did not pre-qualify (DNPQ)
Black	Disqualified (DSQ)
White	Did not start (DNS)
White	Race cancelled (C)
Blank	Did not practice (DNP)
Blank	Excluded (EX)
Blank	Did not arrive (DNA)
Blank	Withdrawn (WD)
Text formatting	Meaning
**Bold**	Pole position point(s)
Italics	Fastest lap point(s)

Notes:

- † — Drivers did not finish the race, but were classified as they completed over 90% of the race distance.

=== Teams' championship ===
Pos.	Team	No.	CAT (Spain)		MON (Monaco)		BAK (Azerbaijan)		RBR (Austria)		SIL (United Kingdom)		HUN (Hungary)		HOC (Germany)		SPA (Belgium)		MNZ (Italy)		SEP (Malaysia)		YMC (United Arab Emirates)		Points
1	(Italy) Prema Racing	20	18	Ret	11	18	**1**	1	Ret	5	2	4	2	17†	8	Ret	**6**	1	1	3	1	4	**1**	6	430
1	(Italy) Prema Racing	21	**3**	2	15	13	Ret	2	Ret	7	1	7	**1**	7	DSQ	6	1	4	**4**	2	**11**	3	5	9	430
2	(Spain) Racing Engineering	3	1	16	2	6	Ret	Ret	7	13	**7**	22†	7	3	Ret	18	Ret	8	5	1	3	Ret	6	5	258
2	(Spain) Racing Engineering	4	7	3	Ret	16	12†	4	8	1	8	1	8	2	15	11	2	12	7	4	5	14	13	10	258
3	(Russia) Russian Time	9	8	5	6	3	3	11	3	4	9	6	4	8	3	7	4	5	2	14	6	2	10	13	256
3	(Russia) Russian Time	10	4	4	1	8	Ret	5	Ret	12	10	12	9	4	Ret	9	5	21†	10	10	DNS	13	3	7	256
4	(France) ART Grand Prix	1	11	8	8	1	6	Ret	16	15	6	5	6	Ret	9	12	11	11	11	6	Ret	7	2	4	251
4	(France) ART Grand Prix	2	Ret	11	**Ret**	Ret	2	3	**12**	6	18	21	3	1	**1**	2	9	16	14	Ret	2	Ret	4	3	251
5	(France) DAMS	5	6	1	4	5	Ret	9	11	3	16	14	12	Ret	7	1	3	10	12	5	4	12	8	1	147
5	(France) DAMS	6	2	7	Ret	Ret	Ret	13	10	Ret	11	10	16	12	14	17	13	9	16	15	14	10	9	12	147
6	(Indonesia) Pertamina Campos Racing	7	12	14	5	4	5	Ret	1	8	4	13	10	5	Ret	10	16	13	8	Ret	8	6	15	8	114
6	(Indonesia) Pertamina Campos Racing	8	17	13	13	Ret	7	Ret	2	Ret	21	18	22†	10	Ret	Ret	18	15	DSQ	16	16	Ret	Ret	21	114
7	(Netherlands) MP Motorsport	22	10	6	3	7	4	15†	6	2	3	3	11	6	5	5	10	6	9	9	12	8	Ret	11	113
7	(Netherlands) MP Motorsport	23	14	17	9	11	8	14	14	20	19	16	15	11	Ret	16	17	17	17	19	17	Ret	14	Ret	113
8	(Italy) Trident	14	Ret	Ret	16	Ret	Ret	Ret	15	14	20	20	19	15	16	Ret	20	19	19	17	19	Ret	16	18	111
8	(Italy) Trident	15	Ret	12	Ret	14	9	12	4	9	5	2	17	Ret	2	4	7	3	6	Ret	7	1	11	19	111
9	(Italy) Rapax	11	9	10	14	12	10	Ret	13	16	22	19	13	14	6	8	8	2	3	7	9	5	Ret	14	107
9	(Italy) Rapax	12	13	Ret	10	9	Ret	8	9	18	14	11	5	Ret	4	3	14	22†	Ret	11	13	9	7	2	107
10	(United Kingdom) Carlin	18	5	9	12	10	Ret	6	Ret	10	13	9	18	9	13	15	12	7	Ret	13	10	15	12	16	38
10	(United Kingdom) Carlin	19	15	15	7	2	Ret	10	Ret	19	12	8	14	13	10	14	Ret	14	18	8	15	11	Ret	17	38
11	(United Kingdom) Arden International	24	19	18	Ret	17	Ret	7	Ret	17	17	15	20	16	11	Ret	19	18	13	12	18	Ret	Ret	20	12
11	(United Kingdom) Arden International	25	16	19	Ret	15	11†	Ret	5	11	15	17	21†	Ret	12	13	15	20	15	18†			17	15	12
Pos.	Team	No.	CAT (Spain)		MON (Monaco)		BAK (Azerbaijan)		RBR (Austria)		SIL (United Kingdom)		HUN (Hungary)		HOC (Germany)		SPA (Belgium)		MNZ (Italy)		SEP (Malaysia)		YMC (United Arab Emirates)		Points

Key
Colour	Result
Gold	Winner
Silver	2nd place
Bronze	3rd place
Green	Other points position
Blue	Other classified position
Blue	Not classified, finished (NC)
Purple	Not classified, retired (Ret)
Red	Did not qualify (DNQ)
Red	Did not pre-qualify (DNPQ)
Black	Disqualified (DSQ)
White	Did not start (DNS)
White	Race cancelled (C)
Blank	Did not practice (DNP)
Blank	Excluded (EX)
Blank	Did not arrive (DNA)
Blank	Withdrawn (WD)
Text formatting	Meaning
**Bold**	Pole position point(s)
Italics	Fastest lap point(s)

Notes:

- † — Drivers did not finish the race, but were classified as they completed over 90% of the race distance.
