= Morsang =

Morsang is the name or part of the name of two communes of France:

- Morsang-sur-Orge in the Essonne département
- Morsang-sur-Seine in the Essonne département
