= ART Grand Prix =

French motor racing team

(France) ART Grand Prix
- Founded: 1996 (as ASM)
- Founder(s): Frédéric Vasseur; Nicolas Todt
- Base: Saint-Pierre-du-Perray, France
- Team principal(s): Sébastien Philippe
- Current series: FIA Formula 2 Championship; FIA Formula 3 Championship; Formula Regional European Championship; F1 Academy; GT World Challenge Europe Endurance Cup
- Former series: GP2 Series; FR 2.0 France; French Formula Three Championship; Formula 3 Euro Series; GP2 Asia Series; FFSA GT Championship; European Le Mans Series; GT4 European Series; Blancpain Endurance Series; Formula Renault 2.0 Northern European Cup; GP3 Series; Formula Renault Eurocup; DTM
- Current drivers: Formula 2; 16. (India) Kush Maini; 17. (Thailand) Tasanapol Inthraphuvasak; Formula 3; 10. (Japan) Taito Kato; 11. (Poland) Maciej Gładysz; 12. (Japan) Kanato Le; Formula Regional European Championship; TBA. (Singapore) Kabir Anurag; TBA. (Monaco) Matteo Giaccardi; F1 Academy; 14. (France) Lisa Billard; 91. (United States) Kaylee Countryman; 95. (France) Jade Jacquet
- Teams' Championships: French Formula Three Championship : 1998, 2002; Formula 3 Euro Series: 2005–09; GP2 Series: 2005–06, 2009, 2015; GP2 Asia Series: 2008; GP3 Series: 2010–13, 2015–18; Formula Renault Eurocup: 2020; FIA Formula 2 Championship: 2023
- Drivers' Championships: French Formula Three Championship: 1998: David Saelens; 2002: Tristan Gommendy; Championnat de France Formula Renault 2.0: 2002: Alexandre Prémat; Formula 3 Euro Series: 2004: Jamie Green; 2005: Lewis Hamilton; 2006: Paul di Resta; 2007: Romain Grosjean; 2008: Nico Hülkenberg; 2009: Jules Bianchi; GP2 Series: 2005 Nico Rosberg; 2006: Lewis Hamilton; 2009: Nico Hülkenberg; 2015: Stoffel Vandoorne; GP2 Asia Series: 2008: Romain Grosjean; GP3 Series: 2010: Esteban Gutiérrez; 2011: Valtteri Bottas; 2015: Esteban Ocon; 2016: Charles Leclerc; 2017: George Russell; FIA Formula 2 Championship: 2018: George Russell; 2019: Nyck de Vries; 2023: Théo Pourchaire; Formula Renault Eurocup: 2020: Victor Martins; Formula Regional European Championship: 2021: Grégoire Saucy; FIA Formula 3 Championship: 2022: Victor Martins
- Website: http://www.art-grandprix.com/

ART Grand Prix is a French motor racing team that competes in formula single-seaters in Europe. In 2012, it competed in the GP2 Series and GP3 Series as Lotus GP to reflect sponsorship from British sports and racing car manufacturer Lotus. The team competed as Lotus ART in 2011.

== Corporate history ==
ART Grand Prix was created in 2005 as a collaborative project between Frédéric Vasseur, the principal of ASM Formule 3, and Nicolas Todt, the son of the then Scuderia Ferrari team principal and eventually Fédération Internationale de l'Automobile (FIA) president Jean Todt. Vasseur wanted to expand his championship-winning Formula Three team into the newly created GP2 Series, while Nicolas Todt had expressed an interest in team management. He had become involved in motorsport as a driver manager, and was notable for representing Felipe Massa. Todt took charge of the new team's commercial and promotional interests, while Vasseur ran it day-to-day. ART operated from Villeneuve-la-Guyard before moving to Saint-Pierre-du-Perray in January 2024. In April 2007, Bahrain Crown Prince Salman bin Hamad Al Khalifa bought 30% of the team.

Todt sold his shares in December 2018.

== Racing history ==
=== Formula Renault and Formula Three ===
ASM had already competed in European and French Formula Renault 2.0 before expanding its operations to include the Formula 3 Euroseries in 2003. In 2004, the team dominated, with drivers Jamie Green and Alexandre Prémat finishing first and second in the drivers' championship – the latter also winning the 2004 Macau Grand Prix. The trend continued after ART was formed: the team won five straight teams' titles from the award's inauguration in 2005 to 2009, and won the drivers' championships in these years with Lewis Hamilton, Paul di Resta, Romain Grosjean, Nico Hülkenberg and Jules Bianchi respectively. Future Formula One drivers Adrian Sutil, Sebastian Vettel and Kamui Kobayashi also achieved success with the team. In 2010, ART's stranglehold on the championship was broken by French rivals Signature, who fielded Edoardo Mortara to victory in a Volkswagen-powered car, ahead of ART's lead driver Valtteri Bottas, who was the lead Mercedes-powered driver. At the end of the season, ART withdrew from the F3 Euroseries to concentrate on the GP2 and GP3 Series.

In September 2019, ART stated their intention to return to the Formula Renault Eurocup championship for the 2020 season and were subsequently confirmed two months later. The team entered the season with series regular Grégoire Saucy and Mercedes junior Paul Aron.

=== GP2 Series ===
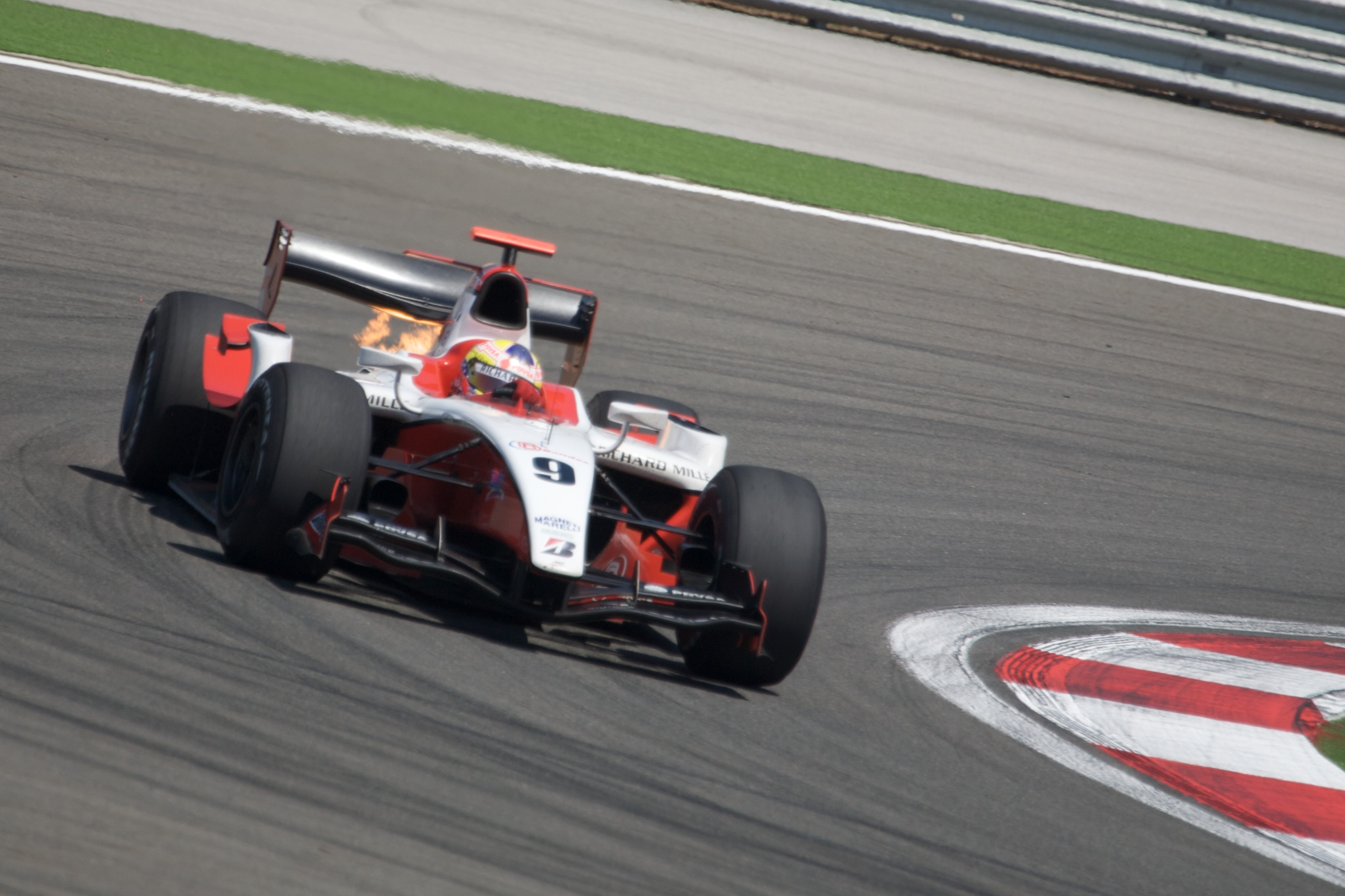
Pastor Maldonado driving for ART at the Turkish round of the 2009 GP2 Series season.

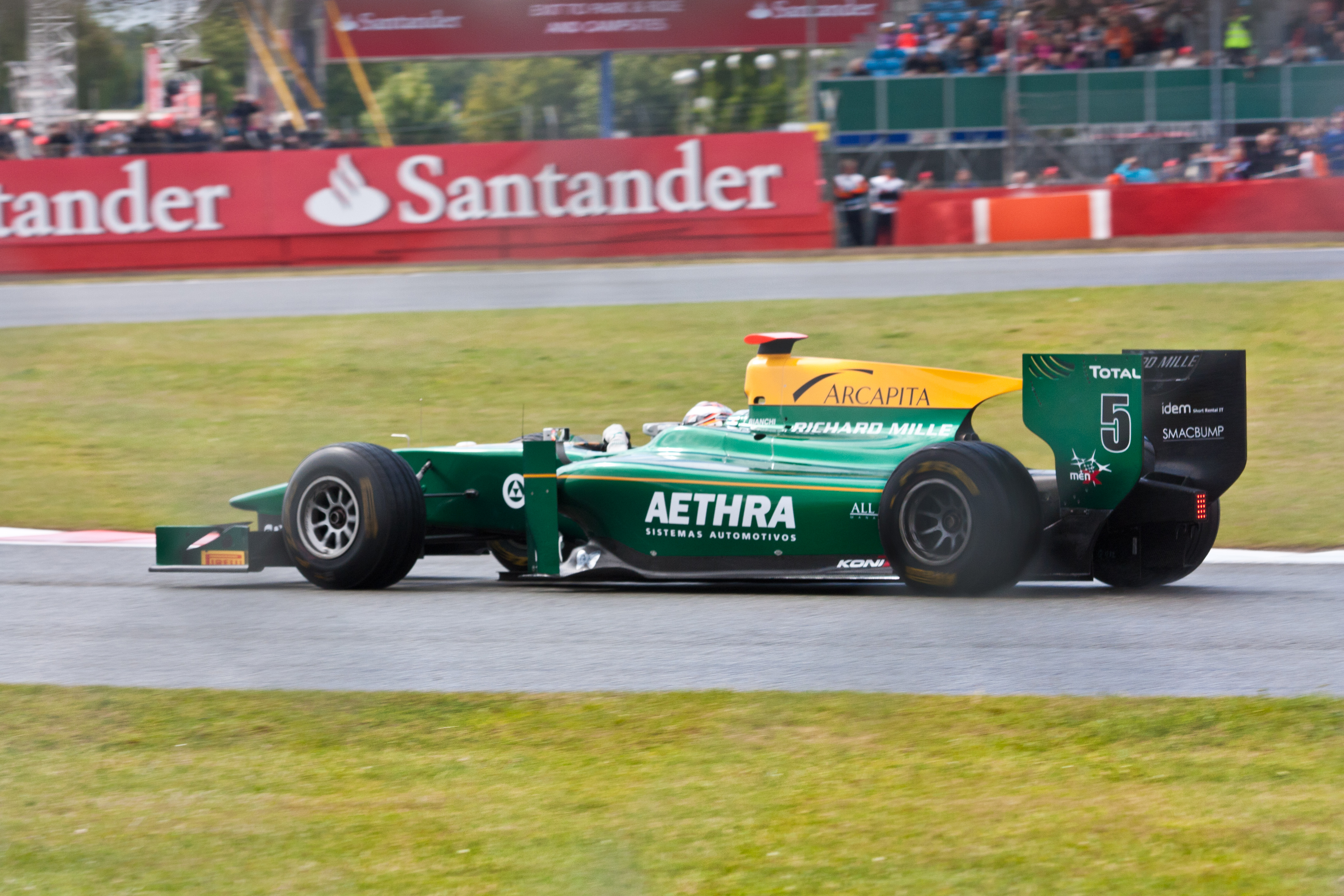
Jules Bianchi driving for ART during the Silverstone round of the 2011 season.

ART Grand Prix was one of several teams to enter the new GP2 Series in 2005. In the team's debut season, it employed F3 Euroseries graduates Alexandre Prémat, of France, and Nico Rosberg, of Germany. Against drivers who had prior experience at this level, from Formula 3000, Rosberg became the inaugural GP2 Drivers' Champion. He showed consistency, with points scoring results at every race meeting, and his championship challenge became stronger as the year progressed. Prémat was 4th in the championship, which was enough to provide ART with the Teams' Championship title. Rosberg's increasingly rapid rise to the top continued when he graduated to Formula One with Williams.

Prémat remained with ART in 2006, and was joined by Britain's Lewis Hamilton. He was a logical choice, having dominated the F3 Euroseries with ASM Formule 3, ART's sister team. Hamilton took an impressive title in his debut season, though his performances faltered slightly mid-season against an increased challenge from the eventual runner-up, Nelson Piquet Jr. Prémat was a consistent and reliable number two to Hamilton; his third position in the Drivers' Championship contributed to ART's second consecutive Teams' title.

For the 2007 season, ART signed Michael Ammermüller and Lucas di Grassi. Ammermüller's campaign was hampered by injury, and he was later dropped in favour of Sébastien Buemi, with Mikhail Aleshin also deputising. Di Grassi emerged as the team's leader, his consistent finishing record allowing him to finish as runner-up in the drivers' championship to Timo Glock despite winning only a single race. The points he accumulated also allowed ART to salvage second in the teams' championship, in spite of the fact that the drivers of the team's other car scored a mere ten points between them.

ART's driver line-up changed again for 2008, with the experienced Luca Filippi partnered by series rookie Romain Grosjean. Grosjean quickly established himself as the number one, winning two races and taking several additional podium finishes en route to fourth in the drivers' championship, only 14 points behind champion Giorgio Pantano. By contrast, Filippi was dropped after scoring points just twice in the first half of the year; he was replaced by Sakon Yamamoto, who also failed to trouble the leading runners despite his Formula One experience. The team slipped to fifth in the championship.

The 2009 season saw another complete overhaul of the team's driving strength, with Pastor Maldonado joining from Minardi Piquet Sports and Nico Hülkenberg graduating to the series as the reigning Formula 3 Euroseries champion. The season soon developed into a contest between Hülkenberg and the two Addax drivers, Grosjean and Vitaly Petrov. Grosjean left the series mid-season after being called up by the Renault F1 team, and Hülkenberg prevailed over Petrov with a total of five victories and 100 points. Maldonado started the year brightly with two sprint-race wins in the first half of the season, but his form tailed off later on, restricting him to sixth in the championship. Nevertheless, ART's tally of points was enough for the outfit to win its third teams' championship in five years.

Another clear-out for the 2010 season resulted in the team signing Jules Bianchi and Sam Bird, two rookies from the F3 Euroseries, which Bianchi had won the previous season with ART. The two were closely matched and featured at or near the front of the field for much of the season, but their inexperience precluded them from challenging for the championship as the GP2 Series became more established with a growing number of experienced drivers. They finished third (Bianchi) and fifth (Bird) in the drivers' championship, with ART finishing in third place in the teams' championship.

For the 2011 season, ART reached an agreement with Lotus Cars to run under the Lotus ART moniker. The team switched from its traditional white-and-red livery to a Team Lotus-inspired green-and-yellow scheme, although this was somewhat confusing as Lotus Cars (sponsoring the Renault team) was involved in a legal dispute in Formula One with a new incarnation of Team Lotus (now Caterham) over the use of the name. Team Lotus was also competing with a green-and-yellow livery, whereas Renault (competing as Lotus Renault GP) was running a black-and-gold colour scheme reminiscent of the original Team Lotus's association with John Player Specials. As for the drivers, Bianchi was retained alongside Esteban Gutiérrez, who was promoted to GP2 after winning the inaugural GP3 Series championship with ART. Bianchi retained his third place in the championship but his season was slightly disappointing as he failed to mount a championship challenge despite his greater experience and his status as a pre-season favourite, whilst Gutiérrez played himself in with a single victory on his way to 13th place in the championship. ART again slipped to fifth in the teams' championship.

The deal with Lotus was extended for the 2012 season, with the team name adjusted to Lotus GP and the colour scheme now altered to match the black-and-gold livery used by the Lotus F1 team, the Renault name having been dropped and the dispute with Caterham solved. With Bianchi moving to the Formula Renault 3.5 Series, another ART GP3 graduate, James Calado, was signed to partner Gutiérrez. The second-year driver improved to third place in the drivers' championship with three victories, albeit someway behind title protagonists Davide Valsecchi and Luiz Razia, whilst Calado impressed by winning twice and finishing fifth overall as the season's top rookie driver. In 2014, the team finished 3rd in the constructor's championship whilst rookie Stoffel Vandoorne finished as GP2 runner-up.

The team entered the 2015 season with Vandoorne and McLaren protégé Nobuharu Matsushita as their drivers. The team scored eight victories, with Vandoorne claiming the driver's title at Sochi, and claimed its first Team Championship since 2009.

The team went into the 2016 season with Matsushita and Sergey Sirotkin racing with them. They finished fourth in the constructors standings with Sirotkin finishing third in the drivers championship.

=== FIA Formula 2 Championship ===
In 2017 GP2 Series was renamed into FIA Formula 2 Championship, Matsushita remained with the team for a third season in a Dallara GP2/11 car with 2016 GP3 runner-up Alexander Albon joining him.

For 2018 the team promoted their 2017 GP3 Series drivers Jack Aitken and George Russell.

In 2019 the team will be represented by 2018 GP3 Series driver Nikita Mazepin and their 2016 GP3 Series driver Nyck de Vries. Jack Aitken left the team to switch to Campos. While Mazepin struggled to replicate his GP3 performances, de Vries scored four victories and sealed the title in Sochi, while the team finished third in the teams' standings.

The team went into the new decade with Ferrari and Renault juniors Marcus Armstrong and Christian Lundgaard contesting the 2020 championship.

=== GP3 Series ===
ART signed up for the first season of the new GP3 Series, the feeder category of GP2, in 2010. The team immediately replicated its success in other series, with Esteban Gutiérrez becoming the inaugural champion. Team-mates Alexander Rossi and Pedro Nunes finished fourth and 24th respectively, and ART won the teams' championship. The 2011 season saw ART's success continue, with the championship distilling into a battle between its two leading drivers, ART F3 Euroseries graduate Valtteri Bottas and James Calado, with the former winning by seven points. The remaining seat was initially taken by Nunes, but he was dropped after a disappointing run and replaced by Richie Stanaway, who also scored points and helped ART to its second straight teams' championship. All three of ART's 2012 drivers were competitive, securing a third straight teams' championship, but neither won the drivers' title: Daniel Abt's late-season charge brought him up just short of victor Mitch Evans, whilst his early-season rival Aaro Vainio fell away to take fourth, and Conor Daly was also a consistent frontrunner in sixth place overall.

In 2013, Daly was retained with Facu Regalia and British F3 champion Jack Harvey joining the team. The team claimed their fourth constructors championship title, with Daly finishing third in the overall standings and Regalia finishing runner-up to Arden's Daniil Kvyat.

2014 saw ART race with Alex Fontana, Dino Zamparelli and GP3 debutant Marvin Kirchhöfer. By losing the titles to Alex Lynn and Carlin, 2014 also marked the first time ART failed to win the constructor's title.

For 2015, Kirchhöfer was retained with Alfonso Celis Jr. joining from Status Grand Prix and 2014 FIA Formula 3 European champion Esteban Ocon making his GP3 debut with the team. The team secured the team's title in Bahrain, with Ocon securing the championship in the following round after a close duel with Trident's Luca Ghiotto.

The following season, McLaren junior Nyck de Vries, Ferrari junior Charles Leclerc, Nirei Fukuzumi and Alexander Albon formed the team's driver line-up. The team claimed their sixth constructors title at Monza, with Leclerc and Albon claiming the roles of champion and vice-champion respectively.

In 2017, Fukuzumi was retained while Renault Sport Academy member Jack Aitken, Mercedes junior George Russell and Anthoine Hubert were signed to the team.

For the last season of the GP3 Series, the squad retained Hubert and signed trio of FIA Formula 3 European Championship drivers Jake Hughes, Callum Ilott and Nikita Mazepin.

=== FIA Formula 3 Championship ===
In October 2018, ART was listed among ten teams to compete in the inaugural FIA Formula 3 Championship. In December, the team named David Beckmann as their first driver, with Renault juniors Christian Lundgaard and Max Fewtrell confirmed the following month. The team ended its maiden season third in the teams standing, with Lundgaard claiming their sole win in the feature race at the Hungaroring.

The following season, the team signed Formula Renault Eurocup race winner Aleksandr Smolyar and reigning ADAC Formula 4 champion Théo Pourchaire.

=== Deutsche Tourenwagen Masters ===
After a successful single-seaters racing category for many years, ART Grand Prix expanded their involvement into Deutsche Tourenwagen Masters as it was proposed on 29 November 2014 and later announced on 22 April 2015 and thus fielded two Mercedes-Benz AMG C63 Class Coupé DTM cars and thus provided full-works support from Mercedes-AMG. In 2015, Mercedes Team ART Grand Prix was fielded by British driver Gary Paffett and Austrian rookie driver Lucas Auer. Mercedes Team ART Grand Prix was scored only one pole position courtesy of Gary Paffett in Hockenheim race 2 qualifying. In 2016, Mercedes Team ART Grand Prix once again involved in DTM. Gary Paffett and Esteban Ocon were the drivers. Ocon was replaced by Felix Rosenqvist from Moscow round due to his departure to Formula One with Manor Racing as a replacement for Rio Haryanto who was cut short due to personal sponsorship funding problems. Mercedes Team ART Grand Prix once again was scored only one pole position courtesy of Gary Paffett in Moscow race 1 qualifying and 2 podiums. Due to DTM reducing their competitors from 24 to 18 cars (6 per manufacturer) from 2017 season as well as concentrating on junior single-seater formulas, ART Grand Prix officially ceased their DTM operations after just two seasons.

On 13 February 2020 it was announced that the ART Grand Prix team would return to Deutsche Tourenwagen Masters after three-year hiatus and thus hiring former BMW Sauber Formula One driver Robert Kubica as a full-time Deutsche Tourenwagen Masters rookie for 2020 season.

=== FIA World Endurance Championship ===
The team provided technical support for SMP Racing in the LMP1 Class of the 2018 FIA World Endurance Championship.

=== Formula One entry bid ===
ART launched an entry into Formula One as one of many candidates to fill in the 13th slot for the 2011 Formula One season with a possible partnership from the now-defunct Toyota Racing Grand Prix team. The team also announced that it was going to phase out its Formula 3 operation because it wanted to focus only on GP3 and GP2. The 2010 Formula 3 season proved to be ART Grand Prix's last. ART Grand Prix announced their entry bid for F1 on 13 May 2010.

On 24 June 2010, Autosport magazine said that ART were set to become the 13th team for 2011. However, on 7 July 2010, ART announced in its official statement the withdrawal of its entry bid, declaring that "ART Grand Prix had forged strong bonds with several technical and financial partners but with unfavourable economic conditions they could not gather the necessary guarantees to ensure the stability of the project in the long term." As revealed by one of the Formula One insiders during the Czech TV NOVA live coverage of the 2010 British Grand Prix, one of the crucial partners was Michelin, who did not succeed in their efforts to become an official Formula One tyre supplier from 2011.

=== GPX Racing ===
ART Grand Prix also provide technical support to United Arab Emirates-based endurance racing team GP Extreme (GPX) Racing.

== Current series results ==
=== FIA Formula 2 Championship ===
Year	Chassis	Engine	Tyres	Drivers	Races	Wins	Poles	F. Laps	Podiums	D.C.	Pts	T.C.	Pts
2017	Dallara; GP2/11	Mecachrome; V8108 V8	P	(Japan) Nobuharu Matsushita	22	2	1	2	4	6th	131	4th	222
2017	Dallara; GP2/11	Mecachrome; V8108 V8	P	(Thailand) Alexander Albon	20	0	0	1	2	10th	86	4th	222
2017	Dallara; GP2/11	Mecachrome; V8108 V8	P	(Russia) Sergey Sirotkin	2	0	0	0	0	20th	9	4th	222
2018	Dallara; F2 2018	Mecachrome; V634T V6 t	P	(United Kingdom) Jack Aitken	24	1	0	1	2	11th	63	2nd	350
2018	Dallara; F2 2018	Mecachrome; V634T V6 t	P	(United Kingdom) George Russell	24	7	5	5	11	1st	287	2nd	350
2019	Dallara; F2 2018	Mecachrome; V634T V6 t	P	(Russia) Nikita Mazepin	24	0	0	0	0	18th	11	3rd	277
2019	Dallara; F2 2018	Mecachrome; V634T V6 t	P	(Netherlands) Nyck de Vries	24	4	5	3	12	1st	266	3rd	277
2020	Dallara; F2 2018	Mecachrome; V634T V6 t	P	(New Zealand) Marcus Armstrong	24	0	0	0	2	13th	52	5th	201
2020	Dallara; F2 2018	Mecachrome; V634T V6 t	P	(Denmark) Christian Lundgaard	24	2	1	2	6	7th	149	5th	201
2021	Dallara; F2 2018	Mecachrome; V634T V6 t	P	(Denmark) Christian Lundgaard	23	0	0	0	3	12th	50	5th	190
2021	Dallara; F2 2018	Mecachrome; V634T V6 t	P	(France) Théo Pourchaire	23	2	1	4	3	5th	140	5th	190
2022	Dallara; F2 2018	Mecachrome; V634T V6 t	P	(Denmark) Frederik Vesti	28	1	1	1	5	9th	117	3rd	281
2022	Dallara; F2 2018	Mecachrome; V634T V6 t	P	(France) Théo Pourchaire	28	3	0	0	7	2nd	164	3rd	281
2023	Dallara; F2 2018	Mecachrome; V634T V6 t	P	(France) Théo Pourchaire	26	1	2	2	10	1st	203	1st	353
2023	Dallara; F2 2018	Mecachrome; V634T V6 t	P	(France) Victor Martins	26	1	3	6	9	5th	150	1st	353
2024	Dallara; F2 2024	Mecachrome; V634T V6 t	P	(France) Victor Martins	28	1	1	3	5	7th	107	7th	173
2024	Dallara; F2 2024	Mecachrome; V634T V6 t	P	(United Kingdom) Zak O'Sullivan	22	2	0	1	2	16th	59	7th	173
2024	Dallara; F2 2024	Mecachrome; V634T V6 t	P	(United Kingdom) Luke Browning	6	0	0	0	0	26th	7	7th	173
2025	Dallara; F2 2024	Mecachrome; V634T V6 t	P	(France) Victor Martins	27	1	2	1	3	11th	97	8th	127
2025	Dallara; F2 2024	Mecachrome; V634T V6 t	P	(Japan) Ritomo Miyata	27	0	0	0	1	17th	30	8th	127
2026	Dallara; F2 2024	Mecachrome; V634T V6 t	P	(India) Kush Maini	25	1	2	1	3	9th	90	6th	161*
2026	Dallara; F2 2024	Mecachrome; V634T V6 t	P	(Thailand) Tasanapol Inthraphuvasak	23	0	0	0	1	11th	71	6th	161*

* Season still in progress.

==== In detail ====
(key)

Year	Drivers	1	2	3	4	5	6	7	8	9	10	11	12	13	14	15	16	17	18	19	20	21	22	23	24	25	26	27	28	29	T.C.	Points
2017		BHR; FEA	BHR; SPR	CAT; FEA	CAT; SPR	MON; FEA	MON; SPR	BAK; FEA	BAK; SPR	RBR; FEA	RBR; SPR	SIL; FEA	SIL; SPR	HUN; FEA	HUN; SPR	SPA; FEA	SPA; SPR	MNZ; FEA	MNZ; SPR	JER; FEA	JER; SPR	YMC; FEA	YMC; SPR								4th	222
2017	(Japan) Nobuharu Matsushita	8	14	4	1	3	7	12	6	6^{F}	14	10^{F}	8	5	1	16	Ret	2^{P}	7	18	11	6	4								4th	222
2017	(Thailand) Alexander Albon	6	7	5	8	4	6			5	2	18	10	8	7	12	18	14	8	12	9	7^{F}	2								4th	222
2017	(Russia) Sergey Sirotkin							10	4																						4th	222
2018		BHR; FEA	BHR; SPR	BAK; FEA	BAK; SPR	CAT; FEA	CAT; SPR	MON; FEA	MON; SPR	LEC; FEA	LEC; SPR	RBR; FEA	RBR; SPR	SIL; FEA	SIL; SPR	HUN; FEA	HUN; SPR	SPA; FEA	SPA; SPR	MNZ; FEA	MNZ; SPR	SOC; FEA	SOC; SPR	YMC; FEA	YMC; SPR						2nd	350
2018	(United Kingdom) Jack Aitken	9	18	2	11^{F}	6	1	7	Ret	11	DNS	Ret	18	13	12	4	10	11	10	17†	8	14	Ret	10	13						2nd	350
2018	(United Kingdom) George Russell	5	19	12^{F}	1	1	4^{F}	Ret	Ret	1^{P}	17	1^{P}	2	2^{P F}	2	Ret	8	3	7	4^{P}	1	4	1^{F}	1^{P}	4^{F}						2nd	350
2019		BHR; FEA	BHR; SPR	BAK; FEA	BAK; SPR	CAT; FEA	CAT; SPR	MON; FEA	MON; SPR	LEC; FEA	LEC; SPR	RBR; FEA	RBR; SPR	SIL; FEA	SIL; SPR	HUN; FEA	HUN; SPR	SPA; FEA	SPA; SPR	MNZ; FEA	MNZ; SPR	SOC; FEA	SOC; SPR	YMC; FEA	YMC; SPR						3rd	277
2019	(Russia) Nikita Mazepin	19	13	8	Ret	17	14	10	8	Ret	16	12	11	16†	12	12	15	C	C	11	9	8	Ret	10	17†						3rd	277
2019	(Netherlands) Nyck de Vries	6	7^{F}	2	4	5	1	1^{P}	7	1^{F}	10	3^{P}	3^{F}	6	3	2^{P}	6	C^{P}	C	3	3	1^{P}	2	13	13						3rd	277
2020		RBR; FEA	RBR; SPR	RBR; FEA	RBR; SPR	HUN; FEA	HUN; SPR	SIL; FEA	SIL; SPR	SIL; FEA	SIL; SPR	CAT; FEA	CAT; SPR	SPA; FEA	SPA; SPR	MNZ; FEA	MNZ; SPR	MUG; FEA	MUG; SPR	SOC; FEA	SOC; SPR	BHR; FEA	BHR; SPR	BHR; FEA	BHR; SPR						5th	201
2020	(New Zealand) Marcus Armstrong	2	Ret	7	3	Ret	9	16	10	14	14	Ret	15	15	Ret	14	18	9	11	9	14	7	4	11	14						5th	201
2020	(Denmark) Christian Lundgaard	4	5	6	1	Ret	13	4	2^{F}	2	21^{F}	11	11	17	7	3	2	6^{P}	1	Ret	13	19	6	21	12						5th	201
2021		BHR; SP1	BHR; SP2	BHR; FEA	MON; SP1	MON; SP2	MON; FEA	BAK; SP1	BAK; SP2	BAK; FEA	SIL; SP1	SIL; SP2	SIL; FEA	MNZ; SP1	MNZ; SP2	MNZ; FEA	SOC; SP1	SOC; SP2	SOC; FEA	JED; SP1	JED; SP2	JED; FEA	YMC; SP1	YMC; SP2	YMC; FEA						5th	190
2021	(Denmark) Christian Lundgaard	6	2	12	Ret	Ret	12	11	Ret	9	3	13	21	3	14	10	7	C	9	6	15	7	15	18	15						5th	190
2021	(France) Théo Pourchaire	Ret	6	8	7	4	1^{P}	5^{F}	9	Ret	5	10	8	1^{F}	10	4	5^{F}	C	2	Ret	6	Ret	7	9	4^{F}						5th	190
2022		BHR; SPR	BHR; FEA	JED; SPR	JED; FEA	IMO; SPR	IMO; FEA	CAT; SPR	CAT; FEA	MON; SPR	MON; FEA	BAK; SPR	BAK; FEA	SIL; SPR	SIL; FEA	RBR; SPR	RBR; FEA	LEC; SPR	LEC; FEA	HUN; SPR	HUN; FEA	SPA; SPR	SPA; FEA	ZAN; SPR	ZAN; FEA	MNZ; SPR	MNZ; FEA	YMC; SPR	YMC; FEA		3rd	281
2022	(Denmark) Frederik Vesti	13	Ret	12	18†	10	6	7	3	11	14	1	7	6	5	12	14^{P}	5	3	5	4	15	11	11	15^{F}	2	2	11	11		3rd	281
2022	(France) Théo Pourchaire	Ret	1	13	Ret	7	1	5	8	6	2	7	11	4	2	2	13	7	2	9	1	6	Ret	20	9	17	Ret	9	19†		3rd	281
2023		BHR; SPR	BHR; FEA	JED; SPR	JED; FEA	ALB; SPR	ALB; FEA	BAK; SPR	BAK; FEA	MCO; SPR	MCO; FEA	CAT; SPR	CAT; FEA	RBR; SPR	RBR; FEA	SIL; SPR	SIL; FEA	HUN; SPR	HUN; FEA	SPA; SPR	SPA; FEA	ZAN; SPR	ZAN; FEA	MNZ; SPR	MNZ; FEA	YMC; SPR	YMC; FEA				1st	353
2023	(France) Théo Pourchaire	5	1^{P}	Ret	13	18†	2	15†	3	8	2	2^{F}	7	14	7	2	3	4	6	2	2	19	Ret	4	3^{P F}	7	5				1st	353
2023	(France) Victor Martins	3	Ret	2^{F}	Ret^{P}	15	18	13†	DSQ	7	8^{F}	3	3	2	9^{P}	7	1^{P F}	7	3	4	5	2	9	2^{F}	Ret	20^{F}	2^{F}				1st	353
2024		BHR; SPR	BHR; FEA	JED; SPR	JED; FEA	ALB; SPR	ALB; FEA	IMO; SPR	IMO; FEA	MCO; SPR	MCO; FEA	CAT; SPR	CAT; FEA	RBR; SPR	RBR; FEA	SIL; SPR	SIL; FEA	HUN; SPR	HUN; FEA	SPA; SPR	SPA; FEA	MNZ; SPR	MNZ; FEA	BAK; SPR	BAK; FEA	LUS; SPR	LUS; FEA	YMC; SPR	YMC; FEA		7th	173
2024	(France) Victor Martins	11	Ret	Ret	11	7	8	12	9^{F}	Ret	9	1	Ret	10	11	Ret	5	2	2	12	Ret	2^{F}	6	4	2	9	NC	19^{F}	4^{P}		7th	173
2024	(United Kingdom) Zak O'Sullivan	7	4	16†	Ret	8	Ret	9	13	10	1	9	15	9	9	Ret	11	19	14	1^{F}	4	Ret	13								7th	173
2024	(United Kingdom) Luke Browning																							11	7	11	15	6	15		7th	173
2025		ALB; SPR	ALB; FEA	BHR; SPR	BHR; FEA	JED; SPR	JED; FEA	IMO; SPR	IMO; FEA	MCO; SPR	MCO; FEA	CAT; SPR	CAT; FEA	RBR; SPR	RBR; FEA	SIL; SPR	SIL; FEA	SPA; SPR	SPA; FEA	HUN; SPR	HUN; FEA	MNZ; SPR	MNZ; FEA	BAK; SPR	BAK; FEA	LUS; SPR	LUS; FEA	YMC; SPR	YMC; FEA		8th	127
2025	(France) Victor Martins	Ret	C^{P}	14	5	8	3	4	12	17^{F}	Ret	5	8	7	7	8	19†^{P}	2	8	4	Ret	19	Ret	8	15	11	1	7	Ret		8th	127
2025	(Japan) Ritomo Miyata	12	C	9	14	19	16	6	16	10	Ret	13	9	8	Ret	20	15	8	2	15	18	11	14	12	10	16	Ret	13	8		8th	127
2026		ALB; SPR	ALB; FEA	MIA; SPR	MIA; FEA	MTL; SPR	MTL; FEA	MCO; SPR	MCO; FEA	CAT; SPR	CAT; FEA	RBR; SPR	RBR; FEA	SIL; SPR	SIL; FEA	SPA; SPR	SPA; FEA	HUN; SPR	HUN; FEA	MNZ; SPR	MNZ; FEA	MAD; SPR	MAD; FEA	BAK; SPR	BAK; FE1	BAK; FE2	LUS; SPR	LUS; FEA	YAS; SPR	YAS; FEA	6th	161*
2026	(India) Kush Maini	12	16	Ret	5^{P}	12	9	7	4	1^{F}	9	7	12	4	3	15	16	5	2^{P}	20	17	Ret	Ret	8	10	12					6th	161*
2026	(Thailand) Tasanapol Inthraphuvasak	4	6	Ret	15	WD	WD	NC	13	9	12	Ret	5	5	10	12	2	6	5	19	8	15	6	11	11	Ret					6th	161*

* Season still in progress.

=== FIA Formula 3 Championship ===
Year	Chassis	Engine	Tyres	Drivers	Races	Wins	Poles	F. Laps	Podiums	D.C.	Pts	T.C.	Pts
2019	Dallara; F3 2019	Mecachrome; V634 V6	P	(Denmark) Christian Lundgaard	16	1	2	3	2	6th	97	3rd	174
2019	Dallara; F3 2019	Mecachrome; V634 V6	P	(United Kingdom) Max Fewtrell	16	0	0	0	2	10th	57	3rd	174
2019	Dallara; F3 2019	Mecachrome; V634 V6	P	(Germany) David Beckmann	14	0	0	0	0	14th	20	3rd	174
2020	Dallara; F3 2019	Mecachrome; V634 V6	P	(France) Théo Pourchaire	18	2	0	0	8	2nd	161	3rd	251
2020	Dallara; F3 2019	Mecachrome; V634 V6	P	(Russia) Alexander Smolyar	18	0	1	0	1	11th	59	3rd	251
2020	Dallara; F3 2019	Mecachrome; V634 V6	P	(Spain) Sebastian Fernandez	18	0	1	0	0	14th	31	3rd	251
2021	Dallara; F3 2019	Mecachrome; V634 V6	P	(Denmark) Frederik Vesti	20	1	1	0	5	4th	138	3rd	256
2021	Dallara; F3 2019	Mecachrome; V634 V6	P	(Russia) Alexander Smolyar	20	2	0	2	4	6th	107	3rd	256
2021	Dallara; F3 2019	Mecachrome; V634 V6	P	(United States) Juan Manuel Correa	20	0	0	0	0	21st	11	3rd	256
2022	Dallara; F3 2019	Mecachrome; V634 V6	P	(France) Victor Martins	18	2	0	1	6	1st	139	3rd	208
2022	Dallara; F3 2019	Mecachrome; V634 V6	P	(Switzerland) Grégoire Saucy	18	0	0	0	1	15th	30	3rd	208
2022	Dallara; F3 2019	Mecachrome; V634 V6	P	(United States) Juan Manuel Correa	16	0	0	0	1	13th	39	3rd	208
2023	Dallara; F3 2019	Mecachrome; V634 V6	P	(United States) Kaylen Frederick	18	0	0	0	0	21st	11	8th	71
2023	Dallara; F3 2019	Mecachrome; V634 V6	P	(Switzerland) Grégoire Saucy	18	0	1	2	2	14th	54	8th	71
2023	Dallara; F3 2019	Mecachrome; V634 V6	P	(Bulgaria) Nikola Tsolov	18	0	0	0	0	22nd	6	8th	71
2024	Dallara; F3 2019	Mecachrome; V634 V6	P	(Australia) Christian Mansell	20	0	1	0	5	5th	112	3rd	245
2024	Dallara; F3 2019	Mecachrome; V634 V6	P	(Netherlands) Laurens van Hoepen	20	0	1	1	3	13th	58	3rd	245
2024	Dallara; F3 2019	Mecachrome; V634 V6	P	(Bulgaria) Nikola Tsolov	18	3	0	1	3	11th	75	3rd	245
2024	Dallara; F3 2019	Mecachrome; V634 V6	P	(Finland) Tuukka Taponen	2	0	0	0	0	31st	0	3rd	245
2025	Dallara; F3 2025	Mecachrome; V634 V6	P	(Netherlands) Laurens van Hoepen	19	0	0	1	2	12th	60	4th	152
2025	Dallara; F3 2025	Mecachrome; V634 V6	P	(Finland) Tuukka Taponen	19	0	0	0	3	9th	67	4th	152
2025	Dallara; F3 2025	Mecachrome; V634 V6	P	(Australia) James Wharton	19	1	0	0	1	18th	25	4th	152
2026	Dallara; F3 2025	Mecachrome; V634 V6	P	(Japan) Taito Kato	19	1	1	0	4	4th	105	4th	189
2026	Dallara; F3 2025	Mecachrome; V634 V6	P	(Poland) Maciej Gładysz	19	1	0	0	1	12th	54	4th	189
2026	Dallara; F3 2025	Mecachrome; V634 V6	P	(Japan) Kanato Le	19	0	0	0	1	20th	30	4th	189

==== In detail ====
(key)

Year	Drivers	1	2	3	4	5	6	7	8	9	10	11	12	13	14	15	16	17	18	19	20	21	T.C.	Points
2019		CAT; FEA	CAT; SPR	LEC; FEA	LEC; SPR	RBR; FEA	RBR; SPR	SIL; FEA	SIL; SPR	HUN; FEA	HUN; SPR	SPA; FEA	SPA; SPR	MNZ; FEA	MNZ; SPR	SOC; FEA	SOC; SPR						3rd	174
2019	(Denmark) Christian Lundgaard	2^{F}	6	Ret	15	26	17^{F}	7	5	1^{P F}	5	4	4	13^{P}	9	14	9						3rd	174
2019	(United Kingdom) Max Fewtrell	5	8	Ret	18	2	4	19	12	2	24	9	Ret	14	21	11	11						3rd	174
2019	(Germany) David Beckmann	4	7	10	Ret	15	10	11	6	28†	19	10	12	Ret	28†	WD	WD						3rd	174
2020		RBR; FEA	RBR; SPR	RBR; FEA	RBR; SPR	HUN; FEA	HUN; SPR	SIL; FEA	SIL; SPR	SIL; FEA	SIL; SPR	CAT; FEA	CAT; SPR	SPA; FEA	SPA; SPR	MNZ; FEA	MNZ; SPR	MUG; FEA	MUG; SPR				3rd	251
2020	(France) Théo Pourchaire	13	26	9	1	1	6	12	8	6	3	7	6	2	5	2	2	3	3				3rd	251
2020	(Russia) Alexander Smolyar	9	7	Ret	20	Ret^{P}	7	10	6	13	14	11	12	4	4	20	3	7	10				3rd	251
2020	(Spain) Sebastián Fernández	Ret^{P}	13	13	9	5	8	7	21	24	13	15	13	11	10	Ret	11	9	8				3rd	251
2021		CAT; SP1	CAT; SP2	CAT; FEA	LEC; SP1	LEC; SP2	LEC; FEA	RBR; SP1	RBR; SP2	RBR; FEA	HUN; SP1	HUN; SP2	HUN; FEA	SPA; SP1	SPA; SP2	SPA; FEA	ZAN; SP1	ZAN; SP2	ZAN; FEA	SOC; SP1	SOC; SP2	SOC; FEA	3rd	256
2021	(Denmark) Frederik Vesti	7	3	7	15	10	6^{P}	7	2	1	Ret	16	7	4	6	6	9	3	8	8	C	2	3rd	256
2021	(Russia) Alexander Smolyar	1^{F}	Ret	11	1	7	8	14	25	4	6	4	6	10	8	3	24^{F}	14	3	22	C	23	3rd	256
2021	(United States) Juan Manuel Correa	15	10	14	6	16	9	10	24	14	14	14	14	22	18	21	28	17	27	9	C	11	3rd	256
2022		BHR; SPR	BHR; FEA	IMO; SPR	IMO; FEA	CAT; SPR	CAT; FEA	SIL; SPR	SIL; FEA	RBR; SPR	RBR; FEA	HUN; SPR	HUN; FEA	SPA; SPR	SPA; FEA	ZAN; SPR	ZAN; FEA	MNZ; SPR	MNZ; FEA				3rd	208
2022	(France) Victor Martins	Ret	1	2	9	Ret	1^{F}	2	7	8	2	6	10	21	Ret	7	2	10	4				3rd	208
2022	(Switzerland) Grégoire Saucy	Ret	3	Ret	23†	11	11	18	23	11	14	7	11	12	Ret	5	Ret	6	28†				3rd	208
2022	(United States) Juan Manuel Correa	9	4			5	10	21	Ret	Ret	10	12	6	17	15	2	24	13	24				3rd	208
2023		BHR; SPR	BHR; FEA	ALB; SPR	ALB; FEA	MCO; SPR	MCO; FEA	CAT; SPR	CAT; FEA	RBR; SPR	RBR; FEA	SIL; SPR	SIL; FEA	HUN; SPR	HUN; FEA	SPA; SPR	SPA; FEA	MNZ; SPR	MNZ; FEA				8th	71
2023	(United States) Kaylen Frederick	28	7	10	Ret	24	25	14	17	7	26	22	19	12	Ret	13	15	20	Ret				8th	71
2023	(Switzerland) Grégoire Saucy	7	4	8	2^{F}	3	10	23	27	20	27^{P}	21	9	9	15	10	20^{F}	22	Ret				8th	71
2023	(Bulgaria) Nikola Tsolov	26	15	11	21	14	11	13	19	16	16	15	11	Ret	25	7	17	9	12				8th	71
2024		BHR; SPR	BHR; FEA	ALB; SPR	ALB; FEA	IMO; SPR	IMO; FEA	MCO; SPR	MCO; FEA	CAT; SPR	CAT; FEA	RBR; SPR	RBR; FEA	SIL; SPR	SIL; FEA	HUN; SPR	HUN; FEA	SPA; SPR	SPA; FEA	MNZ; SPR	MNZ; FEA		3rd	245
2024	(Australia) Christian Mansell	14	2	10	10	12	20	Ret	2	11	2^{P}	3	4	12	13	5	4	16	21	22	3		3rd	245
2024	(Netherlands) Laurens van Hoepen	2^{F}	15	3	13	7	13	3	Ret	5	29†	5	8	9	11	9	DSQ^{P}	10	12	13	8		3rd	245
2024	(Bulgaria) Nikola Tsolov	4	11	20	19	13	26	1	27	13	6	1^{F}	6	5	15	29	1			19	17		3rd	245
2024	(Finland) Tuukka Taponen																	14	Ret				3rd	245
2025		ALB; SPR	ALB; FEA	BHR; SPR	BHR; FEA	IMO; SPR	IMO; FEA	MCO; SPR	MCO; FEA	CAT; SPR	CAT; FEA	RBR; SPR	RBR; FEA	SIL; SPR	SIL; FEA	SPA; SPR	SPA; FEA	HUN; SPR	HUN; FEA	MNZ; SPR	MNZ; FEA		4th	152
2025	(Netherlands) Laurens van Hoepen	Ret	12	16	12	17	10	3	6	4	4	12	DSQ	4	7^{F}	23	C	19	8	3	23		4th	152
2025	(Finland) Tuukka Taponen	14	20	3	4	7	4	2	7	Ret	19	Ret	20	18	10	18	C	11	3	11	15		4th	152
2025	(Australia) James Wharton	Ret	21	13	28	22	13	21	11	8	16	1	14	16	6	20	C	5	27†	16	16		4th	152
2026		ALB; SPR	ALB; FEA	MCO; SPR	MCO; FEA	CAT; SPR	CAT; FEA	RBR; SPR	RBR; FEA	SIL; SPR	SIL; FEA	SPA; SPR	SPA; FEA	HUN; SPR	HUN; FEA	MNZ; SPR	MNZ; FEA	MAD; SPR	MAD; FE1	MAD; FE2			4th	189
2026	(Japan) Taito Kato	5	3	16	11	15	9	7	6	18	25	5	6	14	13	1	3	9	2^{P}	4			4th	189
2026	(Poland) Maciej Gładysz	6	5	8	24	23	10	13	Ret	6	1	12	5	Ret	Ret	Ret	18	19	Ret	22			4th	189
2026	(Japan) Kanato Le	28	Ret	9	17	14	13	DSQ	10	16	6	18	23	2	Ret	24†	5	24	13	19			4th	189

=== Formula Regional European Championship ===
Year	Car	Drivers	Races	Wins	Poles	F. Laps	Podiums	D.C.	Pts	T.C.	Pts
2021	Tatuus F3 T-318	(Finland) Patrik Pasma	10	0	0	0	0	12th	11 (Note: Points scored driving for ART Grand Prix. Pasma scored 45 points driving for other teams.)	2nd	422
2021	Tatuus F3 T-318	(Netherlands) Thomas ten Brinke	8	0	0	0	0	17th	28	2nd	422
2021	Tatuus F3 T-318	(Switzerland) Grégoire Saucy	20	8	8	2	10	1st	277	2nd	422
2021	Tatuus F3 T-318	(Italy) Gabriele Minì	20	0	0	0	4	7th	122	2nd	422
2022	Tatuus F3 T-318	(Netherlands) Laurens van Hoepen	20	0	0	0	0	21st	15	3rd	315
2022	Tatuus F3 T-318	(Italy) Gabriele Minì	20	3	3	5	9	2nd	242	3rd	315
2022	Tatuus F3 T-318	(Spain) Mari Boya	12	0	0	2	1	10th	64 (Note: Points scored driving for ART Grand Prix. Boya scored 3 points driving for other teams.)	3rd	315
2022	Tatuus F3 T-318	(France) Esteban Masson	8	0	0	0	0	24th	0 (Note: Points scored driving for ART Grand Prix. Masson scored 1 point driving for other teams.)	3rd	315
2023	Tatuus F3 T-318	(France) Hadrien David	2	0	0	0	0	29th (Note: David raced as a guest driver for ART Grand Prix and was therefore ineligible for a championship position. He later made appearances as a classified driver for Monolite Racing.)	0	8th	98
2023	Tatuus F3 T-318	(Austria) Charlie Wurz	10	0	0	0	0	26th	1	8th	98
2023	Tatuus F3 T-318	(France) Evan Giltaire	4	0	0	0	0	NC	0	8th	98
2023	Tatuus F3 T-318	(Netherlands) Laurens van Hoepen	20	0	0	0	2	10th	71	8th	98
2023	Tatuus F3 T-318	(France) Marcus Amand	20	0	1	0	1	18th	26	8th	98
2024	Tatuus F3 T-318	(France) Alessandro Giusti	20	2	0	2	7	4th	195	4th	292
2024	Tatuus F3 T-318	(Switzerland) Léna Bühler	11	0	0	0	0	38th	0	4th	292
2024	Tatuus F3 T-318	(France) Evan Giltaire	20	1	0	1	2	7th	97	4th	292
2024	Tatuus F3 T-318	(Ukraine) Yaroslav Veselaho	18	0	0	0	0	35th	0	4th	292
2025	Tatuus F3 T-318	(Japan) Kanato Le	20	0	0	0	0	14th	30	4th	313
2025	Tatuus F3 T-318	(France) Taito Kato (Note: Kato is a Japanese driver who competed under a French licence.)	20	0	0	0	2	7th	107	4th	313
2025	Tatuus F3 T-318	(France) Evan Giltaire	20	1	2	0	5	5th	185	4th	313
2026	Tatuus T-326	(Singapore) Kabir Anurag	19	0	0	0	0	21st	21	7th	83
2026	Tatuus T-326	(Monaco) Matteo Giaccardi	19	0	0	0	0	27th	6	7th	83
2026	Tatuus T-326	(France) Alexandre Munoz	19	1	1	0	2	13th	56	7th	83

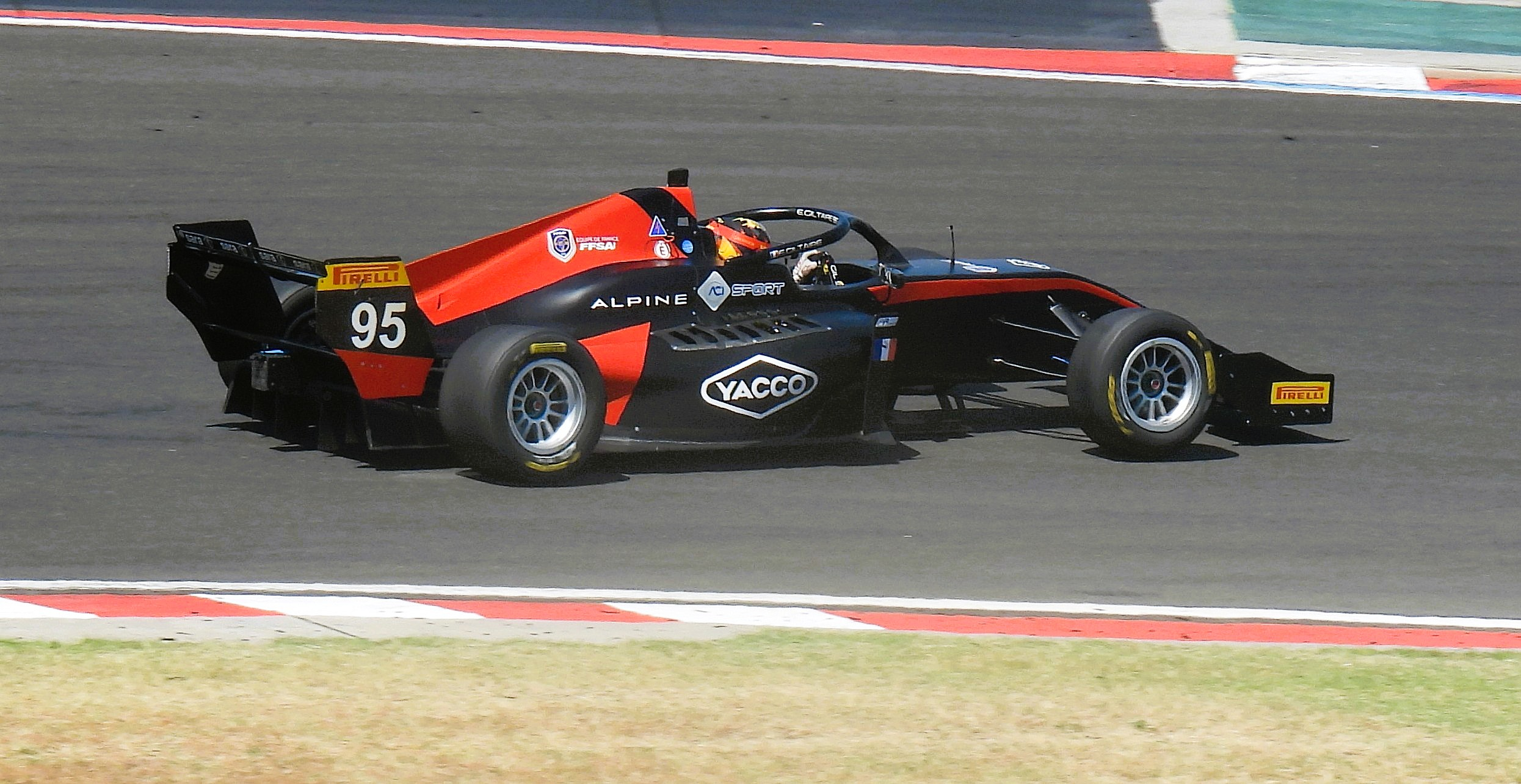
Evan Giltaire driving for ART Grand Prix in the 2025 Formula Regional European Championship

==== In detail ====
(key)

Year	Drivers	1	2	3	4	5	6	7	8	9	10	11	12	13	14	15	16	17	18	19	20	T.C.	Points
2021		IMO; 1	IMO; 2	CAT; 1	CAT; 2	MCO; 1	MCO; 2	LEC; 1	LEC; 2	ZAN; 1	ZAN; 2	SPA; 1	SPA; 2	RBR; 1	RBR; 2	VAL; 1	VAL; 2	MUG; 1	MUG; 2	MNZ; 1	MNZ; 2	2nd	422
2021	(Finland) Patrik Pasma											5	11	17	10	33	22	16	18	16	Ret	2nd	422
2021	(Netherlands) Thomas ten Brinke	WD	WD	8	6	16	7	8	9	19	21											2nd	422
2021	(Switzerland) Grégoire Saucy	5	1^{P}	1^{P F}	1^{P}	22	Ret	DSQ^{P}	1^{P}	1^{P F}	1^{P}	8	1^{P}	5	1	12	3	5	3	4	10	2nd	422
2021	(Italy) Gabriele Minì	11	6	2	5	10	10	3	Ret	2	3	6	4	11	12	14	10	9	Ret	Ret	5	2nd	422
2022		MNZ; 1	MNZ; 2	IMO; 1	IMO; 2	MCO; 1	MCO; 2	LEC; 1	LEC; 2	ZAN; 1	ZAN; 2	HUN; 1	HUN; 2	SPA; 1	SPA; 2	RBR; 1	RBR; 2	CAT; 1	CAT; 2	MUG; 1	MUG; 2	3rd	315
2022	(Netherlands) Laurens van Hoepen	Ret	Ret	20	13	8	8	18	13	19	21	11	15	20	15	8	Ret	18	19	10	17	3rd	315
2022	(Italy) Gabriele Minì	15	3	28^{P F}	1^{P}	4	3	5	1^{P}	3	2	2	2^{F}	DSQ	6	7	4^{F}	5	7	Ret^{F}	1^{F}	3rd	315
2022	(Spain) Mari Boya	7	6	2	21	7^{F}	7^{F}	7	7	5	12	12	14									3rd	315
2022	(France) Esteban Masson													17	22	22	Ret	19	16	19	22	3rd	315
2023		IMO; 1	IMO; 2	CAT; 1	CAT; 2	HUN; 1	HUN; 2	SPA; 1	SPA; 2	MUG; 1	MUG; 2	LEC; 1	LEC; 2	RBR; 1	RBR; 2	MNZ; 1	MNZ; 2	ZAN; 1	ZAN; 2	HOC; 1	HOC; 2	8th	98
2023	(France) Hadrien David							16	4													8th	98
2023	(Austria) Charlie Wurz	26	10	16	18	22	22			18	13	Ret	27									8th	98
2023	(France) Evan Giltaire																	21	11	22	15	8th	98
2023	(Netherlands) Laurens van Hoepen	11	12	10	9	13	5	19	16	16	22†	6	Ret	17	20	7	5	3	3	9	18	8th	98
2023	(France) Marcus Amand	18	8	22	20	29	21	21	18	19	11	16	15	24	Ret	13	9	13	2^{P}	16	Ret	8th	98
2024		HOC; 1	HOC; 2	SPA; 1	SPA; 2	ZAN; 1	ZAN; 2	HUN; 1	HUN; 2	MUG; 1	MUG; 2	LEC; 1	LEC; 2	IMO; 1	IMO; 2	RBR; 1	RBR; 2	CAT; 1	CAT; 2	MNZ; 1	MNZ; 2	4th	292
2024	(France) Alessandro Giusti	8	14	7	4	3	3	4	7	11	8	7	1	5	1^{F}	3	Ret	8	2	Ret	2^{F}	4th	292
2024	(Switzerland) Léna Bühler	26	Ret	27	25	27	26	Ret	25	Ret	28	DNS	22									4th	292
2024	(France) Evan Giltaire	Ret	1^{F}	12	6	5	11	5	13	22	21	8	4	14	Ret	2	11	15	12	5	11	4th	292
2024	(Ukraine) Yaroslav Veselaho	Ret	26	25	26	29	28	23	28	27	29	23	28	26	20	Ret	WD	DNS	26	22	23	4th	292
2025		MIS; 1	MIS; 2	SPA; 1	SPA; 2	ZAN; 1	ZAN; 2	HUN; 1	HUN; 2	LEC; 1	LEC; 2	IMO; 1	IMO; 2	RBR; 1	RBR; 2	CAT; 1	CAT; 2	HOC; 1	HOC; 2	MNZ; 1	MNZ; 2	4th	313
2025	(Japan) Kanato Le	11	16	9	4	12	12	11	6	Ret	11	9	19	18	16	10	10	10	9	14	19	4th	313
2025	(France) Taito Kato	5	17	10	3	15	8	12	9	3	13	6	8	14	14	6	8	9	6	4	4	4th	313
2025	(France) Evan Giltaire	2	1^{P}	4	13	4	16	7	5	9	7	15	6	9	7	7	4	4	3	2^{P}	3	4th	313
2026		RBR; 1	RBR; 2	RBR; 3	ZAN; 1	ZAN; 2	SPA; 1	SPA; 2	SPA; 3	MNZ; 1	MNZ; 2	MNZ; 3	HUN; 1	HUN; 2	LEC; 1	LEC; 2	IMO; 1	IMO; 2	IMO; 3	HOC; 1	HOC; 2	7th	83
2026	(Singapore) Kabir Anurag	16	16	18	26	18	21	C	25	20	8	25†	9	12	12	10	6	5	20	20	10	7th	83
2026	(Monaco) Matteo Giaccardi	21	24	15	14	19	14	C	14	Ret	14	20	25	23	Ret	20	7	14	17	21	17	7th	83
2026	(France) Alexandre Munoz	26	18	8	20	8	1^{P}	C	9	12	Ret	11	11	17	15	16	3	21	8	12	16	7th	83

=== F1 Academy ===
Year	Chassis	Tyres	Drivers	Races	Wins	Poles	F. Laps	Podiums	D.C.	Pts	T.C.	Pts
2023	Tatuus F4-T421	P	(Switzerland) Léna Bühler	21	2	2	1	13	2nd	222	4th	312
2023	Tatuus F4-T421	P	(Germany) Carrie Schreiner	21	1	0	0	1	11th	56	4th	312
2023	Tatuus F4-T421	P	(United Kingdom) Chloe Grant	19	0	0	0	0	12th	34	4th	312
2024	Tatuus F4-T421	P	(Philippines) Bianca Bustamante	14	0	0	1	1	7th	73	5th	144
2024	Tatuus F4-T421	P	(United States) Lia Block	14	0	0	0	0	8th	44	5th	144
2024	Tatuus F4-T421	P	(Brazil) Aurelia Nobels	14	0	0	0	0	12th	29	5th	144
2025	Tatuus F4-T421	P	(United States) Lia Block	14	1	0	0	2	9th	37	5th	57
2025	Tatuus F4-T421	P	(Brazil) Aurelia Nobels	14	0	0	0	1	13th	17	5th	57
2025	Tatuus F4-T421	P	(United States) Courtney Crone	14	0	0	0	0	19th	3	5th	57
2026	Tatuus F4-T421	P	(France) Lisa Billard									
2026	Tatuus F4-T421	P	(United States) Kaylee Countryman									
2026	Tatuus F4-T421	P	(France) Jade Jacquet									

==== In detail ====
(key)

Year	Drivers	1	2	3	4	5	6	7	8	9	10	11	12	13	14	15	16	17	18	19	20	21	T.C.	Points
2023		RBR; 1	RBR; 2	RBR; 3	VAL; 1	VAL; 2	VAL; 3	CAT; 1	CAT; 2	CAT; 3	ZAN; 1	ZAN; 2	ZAN; 3	MNZ; 1	MNZ; 2	MNZ; 3	LEC; 1	LEC; 2	LEC; 3	COA; 1	COA; 2	COA; 3	4th	312
2023	(Switzerland) Léna Bühler	Ret	2	6	3	2	4	Ret^{F}	4	1^{P}	2	3	3	2	1	10	4	2	2^{P}	3	2	4	4th	312
2023	(Germany) Carrie Schreiner	Ret	10	7	12	11	8	9	10	13	6	1	8	Ret	4	6	9	6	8	11	11	14	4th	312
2023	(United Kingdom) Chloe Grant	10	Ret	9	4	7	11	7	7	11	12	12	7	Ret	WD	WD	10	11	13	Ret	9	9	4th	312
2024		JED; 1	JED; 2	MIA; 1	MIA; 2	CAT; 1	CAT; 2	ZAN; 1	ZAN; 2	SIN; 1	SIN; 2	LUS; 1	LUS; 2	YMC; 1	YMC; 2	YMC; 3							5th	144
2024	(Philippines) Bianca Bustamante	5	6	9^{F}	2	4	7	14	11	16	14	16	C	5	7	14							5th	144
2024	(United States) Lia Block	16†	11	15	10	10	6	9	15	4	4	6	C	12	12	15							5th	144
2024	(Brazil) Aurelia Nobels	7	Ret	13	13	13	14	7	5	14	12	9	C	10	11	8							5th	144
2025		SHA; 1	SHA; 2	JED; 1	JED; 2	MIA; 1	MIA; 2	MTL; 1	MTL; 2	MTL; 3	ZAN; 1	ZAN; 2	SIN; 1	SIN; 2	LVG; 1	LVG; 2							5th*	56*
2025	(United States) Lia Block	9	9	12	14	10	C	4	8	Ret	2	12	1	17	5								5th*	56*
2025	(Brazil) Aurelia Nobels	Ret	Ret	10	11	6	C	9	13	Ret	9	14	4	12	3								5th*	56*
2025	(United States) Courtney Crone	12	12	Ret	12	9	C	11	12	Ret	13	11	13	10	7								5th*	56*

* Season still in progress.

=== Italian F4 Championship ===
Year	Chassis	Drivers	Races	Wins	Poles	F. Laps	Podiums	Pts	D.C.	Pts	T.C.
2024	Tatuus F4-T421	(United States) Lia Block	3	0	0	0	0	0	49th	0	13th
2024	Tatuus F4-T421	(Philippines) Bianca Bustamante	3	0	0	0	0	0	52nd	0	13th

=== Euro 4 Championship ===
Year	Chassis	Drivers	Races	Wins	Poles	F. Laps	Podiums	Pts	D.C.	Pts	T.C.
2024	Tatuus F4-T421	(Brazil) Aurelia Nobels	3	0	0	0	0	0	29th	0	10th
2024	Tatuus F4-T421	(Philippines) Bianca Bustamante	3	0	0	0	0	0	34th	0	10th

=== Formula Regional Middle East Championship ===
Year	Chassis	Drivers	Races	Wins	Poles	F. Laps	Podiums	Pts	D.C.	Pts	T.C.
2025	Tatuus F3 T-318	(France) Evan Giltaire	14	3	5	2	8	254	1st	349	3rd
2025	Tatuus F3 T-318	(Japan) Kanato Le	15	1	0	1	1	119	8th	349	3rd
2025	Tatuus F3 T-318	(Japan) Taito Kato	15	0	0	0	1	75	12th	349	3rd

== Former series results ==
=== Formula 3 Euro Series ===
Year	Car	Drivers	Wins	Poles	F.L.	D.C.	T.C.	Points
2003	Dallara F303-Mercedes HWA	(France) Olivier Pla	0	3	0	**3rd**	N/A	N/A
2003	Dallara F303-Mercedes HWA	(France) Alexandre Prémat	1	2	2	7th	N/A	N/A
2003	Dallara F303-Mercedes HWA	(Canada) Bruno Spengler	0	0	0	10th	N/A	N/A
2003	Dallara F303-Mercedes HWA	(United Kingdom) Jamie Green	0	0	0	20th	N/A	N/A
2004	Dallara F303-Mercedes HWA	(United Kingdom) Jamie Green	7	6	8	**1st**	N/A	N/A
2004	Dallara F303-Mercedes HWA	(France) Alexandre Prémat	3	4	3	**2nd**	N/A	N/A
2004	Dallara F303-Mercedes HWA	(France) Eric Salignon	3	2	3	6th	N/A	N/A
2005	Dallara F305-Mercedes HWA	(United Kingdom) Lewis Hamilton	15	8	10	**1st**	**1st**	**261**
2005	Dallara F305-Mercedes HWA	(Germany) Adrian Sutil	2	1	3	**2nd**	**1st**	**261**
2006	Dallara F305-Mercedes HWA	(United Kingdom) Paul di Resta	5	3	1	**1st**	**1st**	**197**
2006	Dallara F305-Mercedes HWA	(Germany) Sebastian Vettel	4	1	5	**2nd**	**1st**	**197**
2006	Dallara F305-Mercedes HWA	(Netherlands) Giedo van der Garde	1	1	0	6th	**1st**	**197**
2006	Dallara F305-Mercedes HWA	(Japan) Kamui Kobayashi	0	1	1	8th	**1st**	**197**
2007	Dallara F305-Mercedes HWA	(France) Romain Grosjean	6	4	7	**1st**	**1st**	**229**
2007	Dallara F305-Mercedes HWA	(Germany) Nico Hülkenberg	4	2	3	**3rd**	**1st**	**229**
2007	Dallara F305-Mercedes HWA	(Japan) Kamui Kobayashi	1	1	0	4th	**1st**	**229**
2007	Dallara F305-Mercedes HWA	(France) Tom Dillmann	0	0	0	9th	**1st**	**229**
2008	Dallara F308-Mercedes HWA	(Germany) Nico Hülkenberg	7	6	7	**1st**	**1st**	**159**
2008	Dallara F308-Mercedes HWA	(France) Jules Bianchi	2	2	1	**3rd**	**1st**	**159**
2008	Dallara F308-Mercedes HWA	(United Kingdom) Jon Lancaster	1	0	2	12th	**1st**	**159**
2008	Dallara F308-Mercedes HWA	(United Kingdom) James Jakes	1	1	2	13th	**1st**	**159**
2009	Dallara F308-Mercedes HWA	(France) Jules Bianchi	9	6	7	**1st**	**1st**	**183**
2009	Dallara F308-Mercedes HWA	(Finland) Valtteri Bottas	2	0	1	**3rd**	**1st**	**183**
2009	Dallara F308-Mercedes HWA	(Mexico) Esteban Gutiérrez	0	0	0	9th	**1st**	**183**
2009	Dallara F308-Mercedes HWA	(France) Adrien Tambay	0	0	0	23rd	**1st**	**183**
2010	Dallara F308-Mercedes HWA	(Finland) Valtteri Bottas	2	1	4	**3rd**	**2nd**	**148**
2010	Dallara F308-Mercedes HWA	(United Kingdom) Alexander Sims	1	0	0	4th	**2nd**	**148**
2010	Dallara F308-Mercedes HWA	(France) Jim Pla	1	0	0	10th	**2nd**	**148**

- ART Grand Prix competed under the name **ASM Formule 3** from 2003 to 2007.

=== GP2 Series ===
Year	Car	Drivers	Races	Wins	Poles	F.L.	D.C.	T.C.	Points
2005	Dallara GP2/05-Mecachrome	(Germany) Nico Rosberg	23	5	4	4	**1st**	**1st**	**187**
2005	Dallara GP2/05-Mecachrome	(France) Alexandre Prémat	23	2	1	2	4th	**1st**	**187**
2006	Dallara GP2/05-Mecachrome	(United Kingdom) Lewis Hamilton	21	5	1	7	**1st**	**1st**	**180**
2006	Dallara GP2/05-Mecachrome	(France) Alexandre Prémat	21	1	0	1	**3rd**	**1st**	**180**
2007	Dallara GP2/05-Mecachrome	(Brazil) Lucas di Grassi	21	1	0	0	**2nd**	**2nd**	**87**
2007	Dallara GP2/05-Mecachrome	(Switzerland) Sébastien Buemi	11	0	0	2	21st	**2nd**	**87**
2007	Dallara GP2/05-Mecachrome	(Russia) Mikhail Aleshin	4	0	0	0	25th	**2nd**	**87**
2007	Dallara GP2/05-Mecachrome	(Germany) Michael Ammermüller	6	0	0	1	26th	**2nd**	**87**
2008	Dallara GP2/08-Mecachrome	(France) Romain Grosjean	20	2	1	2	4th	5th	70
2008	Dallara GP2/08-Mecachrome	(Italy) Luca Filippi	10	0	0	0	19th	5th	70
2008	Dallara GP2/08-Mecachrome	(Japan) Sakon Yamamoto	10	0	0	0	23rd	5th	70
2009	Dallara GP2/08-Mecachrome	(Germany) Nico Hülkenberg	20	5	3	6	**1st**	**1st**	**136**
2009	Dallara GP2/08-Mecachrome	(Venezuela) Pastor Maldonado	20	2	0	1	6th	**1st**	**136**
2010	Dallara GP2/08-Mecachrome	(France) Jules Bianchi	20	0	3	1	**3rd**	**3rd**	**100**
2010	Dallara GP2/08-Mecachrome	(United Kingdom) Sam Bird	20	1	1	4	5th	**3rd**	**100**
2011 (Note: ART Grand Prix competed under the name Lotus ART in 2011.)	Dallara GP2/11-Mecachrome	(France) Jules Bianchi	18	1	1	0	**3rd**	5th	68
2011	Dallara GP2/11-Mecachrome	(Mexico) Esteban Gutiérrez	17	1	0	1	13th	5th	68
2012 (Note: ART Grand Prix competed under the name Lotus GP in 2012.)	Dallara GP2/11-Mecachrome	(Mexico) Esteban Gutiérrez	24	3	0	5	**3rd**	**2nd**	**336**
2012	Dallara GP2/11-Mecachrome	(United Kingdom) James Calado	24	2	2	1	5th	**2nd**	**336**
2013	Dallara GP2/11-Mecachrome	(United Kingdom) James Calado	22	2	0	2	**3rd**	5th	168
2013	Dallara GP2/11-Mecachrome	(Germany) Daniel Abt	22	0	0	0	22nd	5th	168
2014	Dallara GP2/11-Mecachrome	(Belgium) Stoffel Vandoorne	22	4	4	4	**2nd**	**3rd**	**255**
2014	Dallara GP2/11-Mecachrome	(Japan) Takuya Izawa	22	0	0	1	18th	**3rd**	**255**
2015	Dallara GP2/11-Mecachrome	(Belgium) Stoffel Vandoorne	21	7	5	7	**1st**	**1st**	**410**
2015	Dallara GP2/11-Mecachrome	(Japan) Nobuharu Matsushita	21	1	3	1	9th	**1st**	**410**
2016	Dallara GP2/11-Mecachrome	(Russia) Sergey Sirotkin	22	2	3	3	**3rd**	4th	251
2016	Dallara GP2/11-Mecachrome	(Japan) Nobuharu Matsushita	20	1	0	3	11th	4th	251
2016	Dallara GP2/11-Mecachrome	(Austria) René Binder	2	0	0	0	23rd	4th	251

==== In detail ====
(key) (Races in bold indicate pole position) (Races in italics indicate fastest lap)

Year	Chassis Engine Tyres	Drivers	1	2	3	4	5	6	7	8	9	10	11	12	13	14	15	16	17	18	19	20	21	22	23	24	T.C.	Points
2005	GP2/05; Renault; **B**		SMR; FEA	SMR; SPR	CAT; FEA	CAT; SPR	MON; FEA	NÜR; FEA	NÜR; SPR	MAG; FEA	MAG; SPR	SIL; FEA	SIL; SPR	HOC; FEA	HOC; SPR	HUN; FEA	HUN; SPR	IST; FEA	IST; SPR	MNZ; FEA	MNZ; SPR	SPA; FEA	SPA; SPR	BHR; FEA	BHR; SPR		1st	187
2005	GP2/05; Renault; **B**	(Germany) Nico Rosberg	8	Ret	9	4	3	3	4	7	1	**1**	4	**1**	4	5	2	**17**	3	2	2	3	5	**1**	1		1st	187
2005	GP2/05; Renault; **B**	(France) Alexandre Prémat	7	2	10	Ret	Ret	4	Ret	**9**	Ret	3	5	2	9	4	1	1	14	Ret	18	Ret	12	2	3		1st	187
2006	GP2/05; Renault; **B**		VAL; FEA	VAL; SPR	SMR; FEA	SMR; SPR	NÜR; FEA	NÜR; SPR	CAT; FEA	CAT; SPR	MON; FEA	SIL; FEA	SIL; SPR	MAG; FEA	MAG; SPR	HOC; FEA	HOC; SPR	HUN; FEA	HUN; SPR	IST; FEA	IST; SPR	MNZ; FEA	MNZ; SPR				1st	180
2006	GP2/05; Renault; **B**	(France) Alexandre Prémat	9	Ret	4	Ret	2	17	1	3	3	6	Ret	2	3	19	Ret	6	3	3	7	5	Ret				1st	180
2006	GP2/05; Renault; **B**	(United Kingdom) Lewis Hamilton	2	6	DSQ	10	1	1	2	4	**1**	1	1	19	5	2	3	10	2	2	2	3	2				1st	180
2007	GP2/05; Renault; **B**		BHR; FEA	BHR; SPR	CAT; FEA	CAT; SPR	MON; FEA	MAG; FEA	MAG; SPR	SIL; FEA	SIL; SPR	NÜR; FEA	NÜR; SPR	HUN; FEA	HUN; SPR	IST; FEA	IST; SPR	MNZ; FEA	MNZ; SPR	SPA; FEA	SPA; SPR	VAL; FEA	VAL; SPR				2nd	87
2007	GP2/05; Renault; **B**	(Germany) Michael Ammermüller	10	7				Ret	19	10	12																2nd	87
2007	GP2/05; Renault; **B**	(Russia) Mikhail Aleshin			6	Ret																9	20				2nd	87
2007	GP2/05; Renault; **B**	(Switzerland) Sébastien Buemi					7					Ret	20	15	17	Ret	13	7	14	10	Ret						2nd	87
2007	GP2/05; Renault; **B**	(Brazil) Lucas di Grassi	5	Ret	3	3	5	2	4	4	4	2	6	4	4	1	11	13	4	3	3	Ret	13				2nd	87
2008	GP2/08; Renault; **B**		CAT; FEA	CAT; SPR	IST; FEA	IST; SPR	MON; FEA	MON; FEA	MAG; FEA	MAG; SPR	SIL; FEA	SIL; SPR	HOC; FEA	HOC; SPR	HUN; FEA	HUN; SPR	VAL; FEA	VAL; SPR	SPA; FEA	SPA; SPR	MNZ; FEA	MNZ; SPR					5th	70
2008	GP2/08; Renault; **B**	(Italy) Luca Filippi	11	Ret	16	14	Ret	12	10	3	8	Ret															5th	70
2008	GP2/08; Renault; **B**	(Japan) Sakon Yamamoto											12^{†}	NC	10	4	Ret	Ret	18	Ret	Ret	Ret					5th	70
2008	GP2/08; Renault; **B**	(France) Romain Grosjean	5	13	2	1	Ret	10	Ret	Ret	5	8	2	4	**17**	12	3	Ret	1	9	4	3					5th	70
2009	GP2/08; Renault; **B**		CAT; FEA	CAT; SPR	MON; FEA	MON; FEA	IST; FEA	IST; SPR	SIL; FEA	SIL; SPR	NÜR; FEA	NÜR; SPR	HUN; FEA	HUN; SPR	VAL; FEA	VAL; SPR	SPA; FEA	SPA; SPR	MNZ; FEA	MNZ; SPR	ALG; FEA	ALG; SPR					1st	136
2009	GP2/08; Renault; **B**	(Venezuela) Pastor Maldonado	5	6	8	1	6	5	7	1	Ret	9	4	Ret	DSQ	8	4	Ret	Ret	15^{†}	11	20					1st	136
2009	GP2/08; Renault; **B**	(Germany) Nico Hülkenberg	9	14	5	3	**5**	4	3	5	**1**	1	1	7	**2**	1	2	Ret	6	3	1	16					1st	136
2010	GP2/08; Renault; **B**		CAT; FEA	CAT; SPR	MON; FEA	MON; SPR	IST; FEA	IST; SPR	VAL; FEA	VAL; SPR	SIL; FEA	SIL; SPR	HOC; FEA	HOC; SPR	HUN; FEA	HUN; SPR	SPA; FEA	SPA; SPR	MNZ; FEA	MNZ; SPR	YMC; FEA	YMC; SPR					3rd	100
2010	GP2/08; Renault; **B**	(France) Jules Bianchi	**Ret**	12	4	3	Ret	13	2	Ret	**2**	5	5	4	Ret	DNS	14	Ret	**2**	4	18	7					3rd	100
2010	GP2/08; Renault; **B**	(United Kingdom) Sam Bird	9	4	18	10	3	10	3	10	4	DNS	14	5	**13**	Ret	Ret	12	1	3	3	Ret					3rd	100
2011	GP2/11; Mecachrome; **P**		IST; FEA	IST; SPR	CAT; FEA	CAT; SPR	MON; FEA	MON; SPR	VAL; FEA	VAL; SPR	SIL; FEA	SIL; SPR	NÜR; FEA	NÜR; SPR	HUN; FEA	HUN; SPR	SPA; FEA	SPA; SPR	MNZ; FEA	MNZ; SPR							5th	68
2011	GP2/11; Mecachrome; **P**	(France) Jules Bianchi	3	7	7	Ret	Ret	19	Ret	7	**1**	5	4	2	7	6	2	2	8	3							5th	68
2011	GP2/11; Mecachrome; **P**	(Mexico) Esteban Gutiérrez	Ret	11	Ret	12	12	DNS	7	1	10	8	12	Ret	Ret	2	14	7	9	6							5th	68
2012	GP2/11; Mecachrome; **P**		SEP; FEA	SEP; SPR	BHR1; FEA	BHR1; SPR	BHR2; FEA	BHR2; SPR	CAT; FEA	CAT; SPR	MON; FEA	MON; SPR	VAL; FEA	VAL; SPR	SIL; FEA	SIL; SPR	HOC; FEA	HOC; SPR	HUN; FEA	HUN; SPR	SPA; FEA	SPA; SPR	MNZ; FEA	MNZ; SPR	MRN; FEA	MRN; SPR	2nd	336
2012	GP2/11; Mecachrome; **P**	(United Kingdom) James Calado	8	1	5	3	16	12	**2**	4	7	Ret	**8**	2	Ret	20^{†}	8	1	4	6	2	3	12	14	Ret	10	2nd	336
2012	GP2/11; Mecachrome; **P**	(Mexico) Esteban Gutiérrez	7	2	3	2	10	4	10	7	23^{†}	8	1	Ret	1	4	10	5	8	1	11	13	9	Ret	2	6	2nd	336
2013	GP2/11; Mecachrome; **P**		SEP; FEA	SEP; SPR	BHR; FEA	BHR; SPR	CAT; FEA	CAT; SPR	MON; FEA	MON; SPR	SIL; FEA	SIL; SPR	NÜR; FEA	NÜR; SPR	HUN; FEA	HUN; SPR	SPA; FEA	SPA; SPR	MNZ; FEA	MNZ; SPR	MRN; FEA	MRN; SPR	YMC; FEA	YMC; SPR			5th	168
2013	GP2/11; Mecachrome; **P**	(United Kingdom) James Calado	2	Ret	12	5	Ret	11	5	5	9	3	2	2	9	6	8	1	6	26	3	20	6	1			5th	168
2013	GP2/11; Mecachrome; **P**	(Germany) Daniel Abt	Ret	16	14	7	11	8	16	22	15	Ret	21	18	24^{†}	14	16	16	17	22	13	DSQ	9	5			5th	168
2014	GP2/11; Mecachrome; **P**		BHR; FEA	BHR; SPR	CAT; FEA	CAT; SPR	MON; FEA	MON; SPR	RBR; FEA	RBR; SPR	SIL; FEA	SIL; SPR	HOC; FEA	HOC; SPR	HUN; FEA	HUN; SPR	SPA; FEA	SPA; SPR	MNZ; FEA	MNZ; SPR	SOC; FEA	SOC; SPR	YMC; FEA	YMC; SPR			3rd	255
2014	GP2/11; Mecachrome; **P**	(Japan) Takuya Izawa	6	12	20	13	Ret	Ret	9	8	16	23^{†}	13	19	3	21^{†}	16	22	Ret	14	20	22	13	10			3rd	255
2014	GP2/11; Mecachrome; **P**	(Belgium) Stoffel Vandoorne	1	22	13	10	14	13	2	15	3	9	2	3	7	1	**2**	6	**1**	13	**5**	2	**1**	5			3rd	255
2015	GP2/11; Mecachrome; **P**		BHR; FEA	BHR; SPR	CAT; FEA	CAT; SPR	MON; FEA	MON; SPR	RBR; FEA	RBR; SPR	SIL; FEA	SIL; SPR	HUN; FEA	HUN; SPR	SPA; FEA	SPA; SPR	MNZ; FEA	MNZ; SPR	SOC; FEA	SOC; SPR	BHR; FEA	BHR; SPR	YMC; FEA	YMC; SPR			1st	410
2015	GP2/11; Mecachrome; **P**	(Belgium) Stoffel Vandoorne	**1**	2	**1**	2	1	8	**1**	2	3	9	5	2	**1**	4	2	3	3	4	1	2	1	C			1st	410
2015	GP2/11; Mecachrome; **P**	(Japan) Nobuharu Matsushita	10	6	11	18	Ret	19	4	3	Ret	19	8	1	Ret	15	Ret	15	10	7	2	Ret	11	C			1st	410
2016	GP2/11; Mecachrome; **P**		CAT; FEA	CAT; SPR	MON; FEA	MON; SPR	BAK; FEA	BAK; SPR	RBR; FEA	RBR; SPR	SIL; FEA	SIL; SPR	HUN; FEA	HUN; SPR	HOC; FEA	HOC; SPR	SPA; FEA	SPA; SPR	MNZ; FEA	MNZ; SPR	SEP; FEA	SEP; SPR	YMC; FEA	YMC; SPR			4th	251
2016	GP2/11; Mecachrome; **P**	(Japan) Nobuharu Matsushita	11	8	8	1	6	Ret	EX	EX	6	5	6	Ret	9	12	11	11	11	6	Ret	7	2	4			4th	251
2016	GP2/11; Mecachrome; **P**	(Austria) René Binder							16	15																	4th	251
2016	GP2/11; Mecachrome; **P**	(Russia) Sergey Sirotkin	Ret	11	**Ret**	Ret	2	3	**12**	6	18	21	3	1	**1**	2	9	16	14	Ret	2	Ret	4	3			4th	251

=== GP2 Final ===
(key) (Races in bold indicate pole position) (Races in italics indicate fastest lap)

Year	Chassis Engine Tyres	Drivers	1	2	T.C.	Points
2011	GP2/11; Mecachrome; **P**		YMC; FEA	YMC; SPR	**3rd**	**9**
2011	GP2/11; Mecachrome; **P**	(United Kingdom) James Calado	8	1	**3rd**	**9**
2011	GP2/11; Mecachrome; **P**	(Mexico) Esteban Gutiérrez	21	5	**3rd**	**9**

=== GP2 Asia Series ===
Year	Car	Drivers	Races	Wins	Poles	F/Laps	D.C.	T.C.	Points
2008	Dallara GP2/05-Mecachrome	(France) Romain Grosjean	10	4	4	4	**1st**	**1st**	**61**
2008	Dallara GP2/05-Mecachrome	(United Kingdom) Stephen Jelley	9	0	0	0	24th	**1st**	**61**
2008–09	Dallara GP2/05-Mecachrome	(Germany) Nico Hülkenberg	4	1	2	1	6th	4th	47
2008–09	Dallara GP2/05-Mecachrome	(Japan) Sakon Yamamoto	11	0	0	0	9th	4th	47
2008–09	Dallara GP2/05-Mecachrome	(Venezuela) Pastor Maldonado	5	0	0	0	15th	4th	47
2008–09	Dallara GP2/05-Mecachrome	(France) Nelson Philippe	2	0	0	0	34th	4th	47
2009–10	Dallara GP2/05-Mecachrome	(United Kingdom) Sam Bird	8	0	0	1	7th	5th	20
2009–10	Dallara GP2/05-Mecachrome	(France) Jules Bianchi	6	0	1	0	12th	5th	20
2009–10	Dallara GP2/05-Mecachrome	(Sweden) Marcus Ericsson	2	0	0	0	24th	5th	20
2011 (Note: ART Grand Prix competed under the name Lotus ART in 2011.)	Dallara GP2/11-Mecachrome	(France) Jules Bianchi	4	1	0	2	**2nd**	**2nd**	**22**
2011	Dallara GP2/11-Mecachrome	(Mexico) Esteban Gutiérrez	4	0	0	0	11th	**2nd**	**22**

==== In detail ====
(key) (Races in bold indicate pole position) (Races in italics indicate fastest lap)

Year	Chassis Engine Tyres	Drivers	1	2	3	4	5	6	7	8	9	10	11	12	T.C.	Points
2008	GP2/05; Renault; **B**		DUB1; FEA	DUB1; SPR	SEN; FEA	SEN; SPR	SEP; FEA	SEP; SPR	BHR; FEA	BHR; SPR	DUB2; FEA	DUB2; SPR			1st	61
2008	GP2/05; Renault; **B**	(United Kingdom) Stephen Jelley	15	12	DSQ	Ret	Ret	18	16	9	18	DNS			1st	61
2008	GP2/05; Renault; **B**	(France) Romain Grosjean	**1**	1	4	4	**9**	2	**1**	Ret	**1**	Ret			1st	61
2008–09	GP2/05; Renault; **B**		SHI; FEA	SHI; SPR	DUB3; FEA	DUB3; SPR	BHR1; FEA	BHR1; SPR	LSL; FEA	LSL; SPR	SEP; FEA	SEP; SPR	BHR2; FEA	BHR2; SPR	4th	47
2008–09	GP2/05; Renault; **B**	(Japan) Sakon Yamamoto	3	14	8	C	17	11	Ret	14	12	Ret	6	4	4th	47
2008–09	GP2/05; Renault; **B**	(France) Nelson Philippe	17	13											4th	47
2008–09	GP2/05; Renault; **B**	(Venezuela) Pastor Maldonado			Ret	C					7	2	Ret	Ret	4th	47
2008–09	GP2/05; Renault; **B**	(Germany) Nico Hülkenberg					**4**	4	**1**	3					4th	47
2009–10	GP2/05; Renault; **B**		YMC1; FEA	YMC1; SPR	YMC2; FEA	YMC2; SPR	BHR1; FEA	BHR1; SPR	BHR2; FEA	BHR2; SPR					5th	20
2009–10	GP2/05; Renault; **B**	(Sweden) Marcus Ericsson	11	12											5th	20
2009–10	GP2/05; Renault; **B**	(France) Jules Bianchi			3	7	**10**	NC	10	Ret					5th	20
2009–10	GP2/05; Renault; **B**	(United Kingdom) Sam Bird	18^{†}	18	Ret	Ret	13	4	6	2					5th	20
2011	GP2/11; Mecachrome; **P**		YMC; FEA	YMC; SPR	IMO; FEA	IMO; SPR									2nd	22
2011	GP2/11; Mecachrome; **P**	(France) Jules Bianchi	1	8	3	Ret									2nd	22
2011	GP2/11; Mecachrome; **P**	(Mexico) Esteban Gutiérrez	Ret	12	11	4									2nd	22

=== GP3 Series ===
Year	Car	Drivers	Races	Wins	Poles	F.L.	D.C.	T.C.	Points
2010	Dallara GP3/10-Renault	(Mexico) Esteban Gutiérrez	16	5	3	7	**1st**	1st	130
2010	Dallara GP3/10-Renault	(United States) Alexander Rossi	16	2	0	1	4th	1st	130
2010	Dallara GP3/10-Renault	(Brazil) Pedro Nunes	16	0	0	0	24th	1st	130
2011 (Note: ART Grand Prix competed under the name Lotus ART in 2011.)	Dallara GP3/10-Renault	(Finland) Valtteri Bottas	16	4	1	2	**1st**	1st	124
2011	Dallara GP3/10-Renault	(United Kingdom) James Calado	16	1	1	2	**2nd**	1st	124
2011	Dallara GP3/10-Renault	(New Zealand) Richie Stanaway	4	1	0	0	20th	1st	124
2011	Dallara GP3/10-Renault	(Brazil) Pedro Nunes	12	0	0	0	32nd	1st	124
2012 (Note: ART Grand Prix competed under the name Lotus GP in 2012.)	Dallara GP3/10-Renault	(Germany) Daniel Abt	16	2	0	0	**2nd**	1st	378.5
2012	Dallara GP3/10-Renault	(Finland) Aaro Vainio	16	1	1	0	4th	1st	378.5
2012	Dallara GP3/10-Renault	(United States) Conor Daly	16	1	0	0	6th	1st	378.5
2013	Dallara GP3/13-AER	(Argentina) Facu Regalia	16	1	1	2	**2nd**	1st	378
2013	Dallara GP3/13-AER	(United States) Conor Daly	16	1	1	1	**3rd**	1st	378
2013	Dallara GP3/13-AER	(United Kingdom) Jack Harvey	16	2	0	1	5th	1st	378
2014	Dallara GP3/13-AER	(Germany) Marvin Kirchhöfer	18	1	2	4	**3rd**	2nd	347
2014	Dallara GP3/13-AER	(United Kingdom) Dino Zamparelli	18	0	0	2	7th	2nd	347
2014	Dallara GP3/13-AER	(Switzerland) Alex Fontana	18	0	0	1	11th	2nd	347
2015	Dallara GP3/13-AER	(France) Esteban Ocon	18	1	2	4	**1st**	1st	477
2015	Dallara GP3/13-AER	(Germany) Marvin Kirchhöfer	18	5	1	1	**3rd**	1st	477
2015	Dallara GP3/13-AER	(Mexico) Alfonso Celis Jr.	16	0	0	0	12th	1st	477
2016	Dallara GP3/16-Mecachrome	(Monaco) Charles Leclerc	18	3	4	4	**1st**	1st	588
2016	Dallara GP3/16-Mecachrome	(Thailand) Alexander Albon	18	4	3	3	**2nd**	1st	588
2016	Dallara GP3/16-Mecachrome	(Netherlands) Nyck de Vries	18	2	1	1	6th	1st	588
2016	Dallara GP3/16-Mecachrome	(Japan) Nirei Fukuzumi	18	0	0	0	7th	1st	588
2017	Dallara GP3/16-Mecachrome	(United Kingdom) George Russell	15	4	4	5	**1st**	1st	578
2017	Dallara GP3/16-Mecachrome	(United Kingdom) Jack Aitken	15	1	2	2	**2nd**	1st	578
2017	Dallara GP3/16-Mecachrome	(Japan) Nirei Fukuzumi	15	2	2	0	**3rd**	1st	578
2017	Dallara GP3/16-Mecachrome	(France) Anthoine Hubert	15	0	0	4	4th	1st	578
2018	Dallara GP3/16-Mecachrome	(France) Anthoine Hubert	18	2	2	4	**1st**	1st	640
2018	Dallara GP3/16-Mecachrome	(Russia) Nikita Mazepin	18	4	1	5	**2nd**	1st	640
2018	Dallara GP3/16-Mecachrome	(United Kingdom) Callum Ilott	18	2	1	2	**3rd**	1st	640
2018	Dallara GP3/16-Mecachrome	(United Kingdom) Jake Hughes	18	1	0	0	8th	1st	640

=== In detail ===
(key) (Races in bold indicate pole position) (Races in italics indicate fastest lap)

Year	Chassis Engine Tyres	Drivers	1	2	3	4	5	6	7	8	9	10	11	12	13	14	15	16	17	18	T.C.	Points
2010	GP3/10; Renault; **P**		CAT; FEA	CAT; SPR	IST; FEA	IST; SPR	VAL; FEA	VAL; SPR	SIL; FEA	SIL; SPR	HOC; FEA	HOC; SPR	HUN; FEA	HUN; SPR	SPA; FEA	SPA; SPR	MNZ; FEA	MNZ; SPR			1st	130
2010	GP3/10; Renault; **P**	(United States) Alexander Rossi	8	1	4	3	Ret	Ret	5	2	Ret	8	8	1	13	2	Ret	15			1st	130
2010	GP3/10; Renault; **P**	(Mexico) Esteban Gutiérrez	3	3	1	7	**1**	7	**1**	3	4	1	2	5	16	7	**1**	Ret			1st	130
2010	GP3/10; Renault; **P**	(Brazil) Pedro Nunes	12	6	Ret	19	15	11	Ret	20	14	6	19	Ret	7	19	24	Ret			1st	130
2011	GP3/10; Renault; **P**		IST; FEA	IST; SPR	CAT; FEA	CAT; SPR	VAL; FEA	VAL; SPR	SIL; FEA	SIL; SPR	NÜR; FEA	NÜR; SPR	HUN; FEA	HUN; SPR	SPA; FEA	SPA; SPR	MNZ; FEA	MNZ; SPR			1st	124
2011	GP3/10; Renault; **P**	(Brazil) Pedro Nunes	22	26^{†}	15	26^{†}	Ret	15	Ret	17	23	Ret	18	14							1st	124
2011	GP3/10; Renault; **P**	(New Zealand) Richie Stanaway													8	1	10	19			1st	124
2011	GP3/10; Renault; **P**	(Finland) Valtteri Bottas	4	8	10	7	7	3	15	12	3	1	**1**	2	1	19	1	17			1st	124
2011	GP3/10; Renault; **P**	(United Kingdom) James Calado	17	13	2	21	8	1	6	5	4	6	25	3	**2**	2	2	14			1st	124
2012	GP3/10; Renault; **P**		CAT; FEA	CAT; SPR	MON; FEA	MON; SPR	VAL; FEA	VAL; SPR	SIL; FEA	SIL; SPR	HOC; FEA	HOC; SPR	HUN; FEA	HUN; SPR	SPA; FEA	SPA; SPR	MNZ; FEA	MNZ; SPR			1st	378.5
2012	GP3/10; Renault; **P**	(Germany) Daniel Abt	13	6	6	3	6	2	4	Ret	**7**	2	2	11	1	5	1	2			1st	378.5
2012	GP3/10; Renault; **P**	(United States) Conor Daly	6	1	23	Ret	11	Ret	5	2	2	3	6	9	7	3	4	11			1st	378.5
2012	GP3/10; Renault; **P**	(Finland) Aaro Vainio	3	4	**1**	7	2	7	3	Ret	5	6	**5**	7	6	14	11	14			1st	378.5
2013	GP3/13; AER; **P**		CAT; FEA	CAT; SPR	VAL; FEA	VAL; SPR	SIL; FEA	SIL; SPR	NÜR; FEA	NÜR; SPR	HUN; FEA	HUN; SPR	SPA; FEA	SPA; SPR	MNZ; FEA	MNZ; SPR	YMC; FEA	YMC; SPR			1st	378
2013	GP3/13; AER; **P**	(United States) Conor Daly	3	5	**1**	8	22	Ret	10	9	2	8	2	2	Ret	8	4	3			1st	378
2013	GP3/13; AER; **P**	(Argentina) Facu Regalia	24^{†}	14	2	7	3	5	**1**	Ret	6	4	3	3	3	4	15	16			1st	378
2013	GP3/13; AER; **P**	(United Kingdom) Jack Harvey	6	6	10	12	1	7	3	10	4	5	Ret	Ret	7	1	5	4			1st	378
2014	GP3/13; AER; **P**		CAT; FEA	CAT; SPR	RBR; FEA	RBR; SPR	SIL; FEA	SIL; SPR	HOC; FEA	HOC; SPR	HUN; FEA	HUN; SPR	SPA; FEA	SPA; SPR	MNZ; FEA	MNZ; SPR	SOC; FEA	SOC; SPR	YMC; FEA	YMC; SPR	2nd	330
2014	GP3/13; AER; **P**	(Switzerland) Alex Fontana	11	19	Ret	17	15	Ret	11	13	14	13	6	3	Ret	10	3	Ret	6	15	2nd	330
2014	GP3/13; AER; **P**	(Germany) Marvin Kirchhöfer	5	5	5	DNS	3	4	**1**	Ret	11	9	DNS	17	3	3	2	3	**2**	11	2nd	330
2014	GP3/13; AER; **P**	(United Kingdom) Dino Zamparelli	6	3	15	8	8	7	6	2	8	2	2	7	2	9	18	13	3	4	2nd	330
2015	GP3/13; AER; **P**		CAT; FEA	CAT; SPR	RBR; FEA	RBR; SPR	SIL; FEA	SIL; SPR	HUN; FEA	HUN; SPR	SPA; FEA	SPA; SPR	MNZ; FEA	MNZ; SPR	SOC; FEA	SOC; SPR	BHR; FEA	BHR; SPR	YMC; FEA	YMC; SPR	1st	477
2015	GP3/13; AER; **P**	(Mexico) Alfonso Celis Jr.	10	10	15	Ret	13	11	18	15	6	3			13	12	8	8	Ret	19	1st	477
2015	GP3/13; AER; **P**	(Germany) Marvin Kirchhöfer	5	1	6	2	**1**	8	3	5	3	Ret	4	1	9	7	1	6	1	7	1st	477
2015	GP3/13; AER; **P**	(France) Esteban Ocon	1	7	3	DSQ	6	2	2	2	2	2	2	2	**2**	2	**3**	2	**4**	3	1st	477
2016	GP3/16; Mecachrome; **P**		CAT; FEA	CAT; SPR	RBR; FEA	RBR; SPR	SIL; FEA	SIL; SPR	HUN; FEA	HUN; SPR	HOC; FEA	HOC; SPR	SPA; FEA	SPA; SPR	MNZ; FEA	MNZ; SPR	SEP; FEA	SEP; SPR	YMC; FEA	YMC; SPR	1st	578
2016	GP3/16; Mecachrome; **P**	(Monaco) Charles Leclerc	1	9	**1**	Ret	2	3	6	3	5	3	**1**	6	**4**	Ret	**3**	5	Ret	9	1st	578
2016	GP3/16; Mecachrome; **P**	(Japan) Nirei Fukuzumi	3	13	7	Ret	11	7	4	4	Ret	11	Ret	15	5	Ret	7	2	5	3	1st	578
2016	GP3/16; Mecachrome; **P**	(Thailand) Alexander Albon	6	1	2	2	**1**	14	7	1	**4**	Ret	9	10	6	2	1	8	**Ret**	Ret	1st	578
2016	GP3/16; Mecachrome; **P**	(Netherlands) Nyck de Vries	9	5	3	4	5	8	**20**	13	2	8	3	8	7	1	13	6	1	11	1st	578
2017	GP3/16; Mecachrome; **P**		CAT; FEA	CAT; SPR	RBR; FEA	RBR; SPR	SIL; FEA	SIL; SPR	HUN; FEA	HUN; SPR	SPA; FEA	SPA; SPR	MNZ; FEA	MNZ; SPR	JER; FEA	JER; SPR	YMC; FEA	YMC; SPR			1st	590
2017	GP3/16; Mecachrome; **P**	(United Kingdom) Jack Aitken	**Ret**	12	2	5	4	2	**1**	Ret	2	18	2	C	3	6	14	8			1st	590
2017	GP3/16; Mecachrome; **P**	(Japan) Nirei Fukuzumi	1	6	3	3	Ret	16	2	Ret	3	4	**DNS**	C	**1**	5	15	14			1st	590
2017	GP3/16; Mecachrome; **P**	(United Kingdom) George Russell	4	5	**1**	6	**1**	4	DNS	11	**1**	2	1	C	2	4	**2**	4			1st	590
2017	GP3/16; Mecachrome; **P**	(France) Anthoine Hubert	5	4	4	7	2	8	3	5	Ret	7	3	C	5	3	11	5			1st	590
2018	GP3/16; Mecachrome; **P**		CAT; FEA	CAT; SPR	LEC; FEA	LEC; SPR	RBR; FEA	RBR; SPR	SIL; FEA	SIL; SPR	HUN; FEA	HUN; SPR	SPA; FEA	SPA; SPR	MNZ; FEA	MNZ; SPR	SOC; FEA	SOC; SPR	YMC; FEA	YMC; SPR	1st	640
2018	GP3/16; Mecachrome; **P**	(United Kingdom) Callum Ilott	3	7	8	1	**1**	6	3	5	6	2	6	3	3	DSQ	13	18	4	4	1st	640
2018	GP3/16; Mecachrome; **P**	(France) Anthoine Hubert	2	2	1	7	17	9	**1**	4	**3**	3	3	2	2	DSQ	3	4	3	Ret	1st	640
2018	GP3/16; Mecachrome; **P**	(Russia) Nikita Mazepin	1	10	2	5	13	7	2	7	1	12	5	1	5	3	2	Ret	**5**	1	1st	640
2018	GP3/16; Mecachrome; **P**	(United Kingdom) Jake Hughes	13	3	10	17	5	1	Ret	8	16	14	7	4	9	4	7	16	7	2	1st	640

=== 24 Hours of Le Mans ===
Year	Entrant	No.	Car	Drivers	Class	Laps	Pos.	Class Pos.
2018	(Russia) SMP Racing	11	BR Engineering BR1-AER	(Russia) Mikhail Aleshin (United Kingdom) Jenson Button (Russia) Vitaly Petrov	LMP1	315	DNF	DNF
2018	(Russia) SMP Racing	17	BR Engineering BR1-AER	(Russia) Matevos Isaakyan (Russia) Egor Orudzhev (France) Stéphane Sarrazin	LMP1	123	DNF	DNF
2019	(Russia) SMP Racing	11	BR Engineering BR1-AER	(Russia) Mikhail Aleshin (Russia) Vitaly Petrov (Belgium) Stoffel Vandoorne	LMP1	379	**3rd**	**3rd**
2019	(Russia) SMP Racing	17	BR Engineering BR1-AER	(Russia) Egor Orudzhev (France) Stéphane Sarrazin (Russia) Sergey Sirotkin	LMP1	163	DNF	DNF

=== Deutsche Tourenwagen Masters ===
Year	Car	Engine	Tyres	Drivers	1	2	3	4	5	6	7	8	9	10	11	12	13	14	15	16	17	18	DC	TC	Pts
2015	Mercedes-AMG C-Coupé C63 DTM	Mercedes V8	H	HOC1	HOC2	LAU1	LAU2	NOR1	NOR2	ZAN1	ZAN2	SPL1	SPL2	MSC1	MSC2	OSC1	OSC2	NÜR1	NÜR2	HOC1	HOC2				
2015	Mercedes-AMG C-Coupé C63 DTM	Mercedes V8	H	(United Kingdom) Gary Paffett	Ret	3	23	Ret	3	7	11	10	7	2	7	6	Ret	13	4	Ret	Ret	**9**	9th	10th	107
2015	Mercedes-AMG C-Coupé C63 DTM	Mercedes V8	H	(Austria) Lucas Auer	Ret	DNS	21	Ret	15	9	17	20	21	6	13	19	15	17	**6**	19	16	19	23rd	10th	107
2016	Mercedes-AMG C-Coupé C63 DTM	Mercedes V8	H		HOC1	HOC2	SPL1	SPL2	LAU1	LAU2	NOR1	NOR2	ZAN1	ZAN2	MSC1	MSC2	NÜR1	NÜR2	HUN1	HUN2	HOC1	HOC2			
2016	Mercedes-AMG C-Coupé C63 DTM	Mercedes V8	H	(United Kingdom) Gary Paffett	11	4	18	13	14	5	14	DSQ	4	2	**3**	18	19	7	20	16	19	15	11th	10th	80
2016	Mercedes-AMG C-Coupé C63 DTM	Mercedes V8	H	(Sweden) Felix Rosenqvist											10	20	12	18	8	11	Ret	Ret	25th	10th	80
2016	Mercedes-AMG C-Coupé C63 DTM	Mercedes V8	H	(France) Esteban Ocon	Ret	Ret	20	18	23	15	Ret	13	9	18									26th	10th	80
2017-2019: ART Grand Prix did not compete.
2020	BMW M4 Turbo DTM	BMW P48 Turbo I-4t	H		SPA1	SPA2	LAU1	LAU2	LAU1	LAU2	ASS1	ASS2	NÜR1	NÜR2	NÜR1	NÜR2	ZOL1	ZOL2	ZOL1	ZOL2	HOC1	HOC2			
2020	BMW M4 Turbo DTM	BMW P48 Turbo I-4t	H	(Poland) Robert Kubica	14	14	13	13	16	16	10	14	16	12	13	Ret	14	12	Ret	3	8	15	15th	8th	20

=== Formula Renault Eurocup ===
Formula Renault Eurocup
Year	Car	Drivers	Races	Wins	Poles	F/laps	Podiums	T.C.	Points
2002	Tatuus Renault 2000	(Portugal) Nicolas Armindo	4	0	0	0	0	7th	80
2002	Tatuus Renault 2000	(Belgium) Mike den Tandt	6	0	0	0	1	7th	80
2002	Tatuus Renault 2000	(France) Alexandre Prémat	4	0	0	0	1	7th	80
2002	Tatuus Renault 2000	(France) Simon Pagenaud	1	0	0	0	0	7th	80
2003	Tatuus Renault 2000	(France) Simon Pagenaud	8	1	0	1	2	**3rd**	**118**
2003	Tatuus Renault 2000	(Portugal) Nicolas Armindo	4	0	0	0	0	**3rd**	**118**
2003	Tatuus Renault 2000	(France) Johan-Boris Scheier	8	0	0	0	0	**3rd**	**118**
2003	Tatuus Renault 2000	(Mexico) David Martinez Leon	2	0	0	0	0	**3rd**	**118**
2004-2019: **ART Grand Prix did not compete.**
2020	Tatuus F.3 T-318	(Estonia) Paul Aron	19	0	0	0	1	**1st**	**471.5**
2020	Tatuus F.3 T-318	(Switzerland) Grégoire Saucy	20	0	0	0	2	**1st**	**471.5**
2020	Tatuus F.3 T-318	(France) Victor Martins	20	6	10	8	14	**1st**	**471.5**

*Season in progress.

- ART Grand Prix competed under the name **ASM** from 2002 to 2003.

== Timeline ==
Current series
FIA Formula 2 Championship	2017–present
FIA Formula 3 Championship	2019–present
Formula Regional European Championship	2021–present
F1 Academy	2023–present
Euro 4 Championship	2024–present
Formula Regional Middle East Trophy	2025–present
Former series
French Formula Three Championship	1997–2002
British Formula 3 International Series	1997, 1999–2000, 2009–2010
Championnat de France Formula Renault 2.0	2001–2003
Formula Renault Eurocup	2002–2003, 2020
Formula 3 Euro Series	2003–2010
A1 Grand Prix	2005–2006
GP2 Series	2005–2016
GP2 Asia Series	2008–2011
GP3 Series	2010–2018
GT World Challenge Europe Endurance Cup	2013–2014, 2021–2022
Formula Renault Northern European Cup	2013–2015
European Le Mans Series	2014
Deutsche Tourenwagen Masters	2015–2016, 2020
GT4 European Series Northern Cup	2017
GT4 European Series Southern Cup	2017
Intercontinental GT Challenge	2021–2022
Extreme E	2021–2024
Italian F4 Championship	2024

== Notes ==
Achievements
Preceded by none	Formula 3 Euro Series Teams' Champion; 2005–2009	Succeeded by Signature Team
Preceded by Arden International (F3000)	GP2 Series Teams' Champion; 2005–2006	Succeeded by iSport International
Preceded by none	GP2 Asia Series Teams' Champion; 2008	Succeeded by DAMS
Preceded by Campos Racing	GP2 Series Teams' Champion; 2009	Succeeded by Rapax
Preceded by none	GP3 Series Teams' Champion; 2010–2013	Succeeded by Carlin
Preceded by Carlin	GP3 Series Teams' Champion; 2015–2018	Succeeded by Prema Racing; FIA Formula 3 Championship
Preceded by DAMS	GP2 Series Teams' Champion; 2015	Succeeded by Prema Racing
