= Tigery =

Commune in Île-de-France, France

- Commune
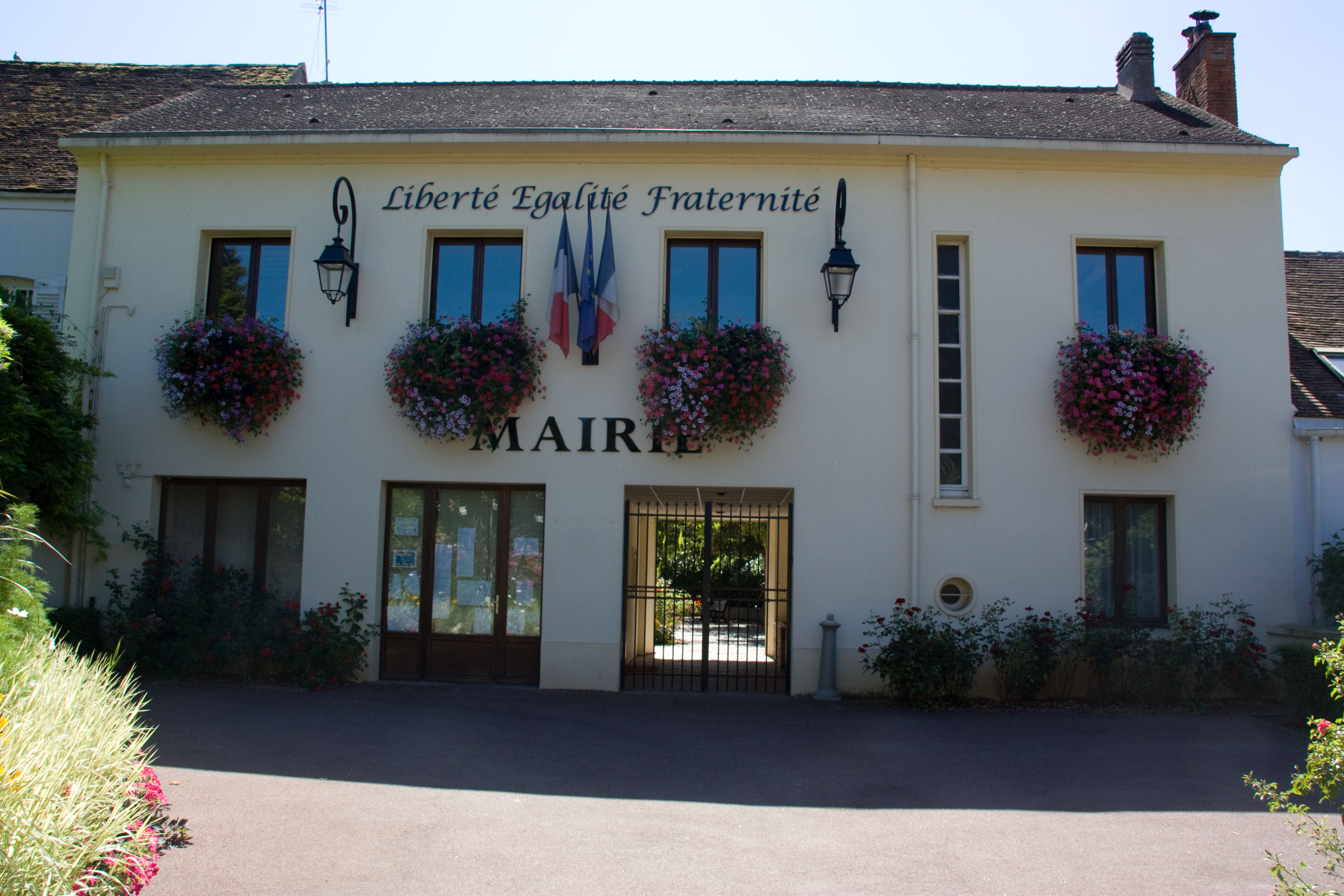
- The town hall in Tigery
- Location of Tigery
- Location within France Location within Île-de-France (region)
- Coordinates: 48°38′21″N 2°30′26″E
- Country: France
- Region: Île-de-France
- Department: Essonne
- Arrondissement: Évry
- Canton: Épinay-sous-Sénart
- Intercommunality: CA Grand Paris Sud Seine-Essonne-Sénart

Government
  - Mayor (2020–2026): Germain Dupont
- Area^{1}: 8.64 km^{2} (3.34 sq mi)
- Highest elevation: 88 m (289 ft)
- Lowest elevation: 58 m (190 ft)
- Population (2023): 4,333
  - Density: 502/km^{2} (1,300/sq mi)
- Time zone: UTC+01:00 (CET)
  - Summer (DST): UTC+02:00 (CEST)
- INSEE/Postal code: 91617 /91250
- ^{1} French Land Register data, which excludes lakes, ponds, glaciers > 1 km^{2} (0.386 sq mi or 247 acres) and river estuaries.

Tigery (French pronunciation: [tiʒʁi]) is a commune in the Essonne department in Île-de-France in northern France.

== Population ==
Historical population
Year	Pop.	±% p.a.
1968	472	—
1975	430	−1.32%
1982	439	+0.30%
1990	1,140	+12.67%
1999	1,257	+1.09%
2007	2,062	+6.38%
2012	3,118	+8.62%
2017	4,017	+5.20%
2023	4,333	+1.27%
Source: INSEE

Inhabitants of Tigery are known as Tigeriens in French.

== See also ==
- Communes of the Essonne department
