= Communauté d'agglomération Grand Paris Sud Seine-Essonne-Sénart =

Coordinates: 48.62°N 2.41°E

Grand Paris Sud Seine-Essonne-Sénart
- Communauté d'agglomération
- Country: France
- Region: Île-de-France
- Department: Essonne, Seine-et-Marne
- No. of communes: {{{nbcomm}}}
- Established: 2016
- Area: 221.2 km^{2} (85.4 sq mi)
- Population (2018): 352,123
  - Density: 1,592/km^{2} (4,123/sq mi)

The Communauté d'agglomération Grand Paris Sud Seine-Essonne-Sénart is the communauté d'agglomération, an intercommunal structure, in the southern suburbs of Paris. It is located in the Essonne and Seine-et-Marne departments, in the Île-de-France region, northern France. It was created in January 2016. Its seat is in Courcouronnes. Its area is 221.2 km^{2}. Its population was 352,123 in 2018.

== Composition ==
The communauté d'agglomération consists of the following 23 communes, of which 8 (Cesson, Combs-la-Ville, Lieusaint, Moissy-Cramayel, Nandy, Réau, Savigny-le-Temple and Vert-Saint-Denis) are in the Seine-et-Marne department:

1. Bondoufle
2. Cesson
3. Combs-la-Ville
4. Corbeil-Essonnes
5. Le Coudray-Montceaux
6. Étiolles
7. Évry-Courcouronnes
8. Grigny
9. Lieusaint
10. Lisses
11. Moissy-Cramayel
12. Morsang-sur-Seine
13. Nandy
14. Réau
15. Ris-Orangis
16. Saint-Germain-lès-Corbeil
17. Saint-Pierre-du-Perray
18. Saintry-sur-Seine
19. Savigny-le-Temple
20. Soisy-sur-Seine
21. Tigery
22. Vert-Saint-Denis
23. Villabé
