= Saintry-sur-Seine =

Commune in Île-de-France, France

- Commune
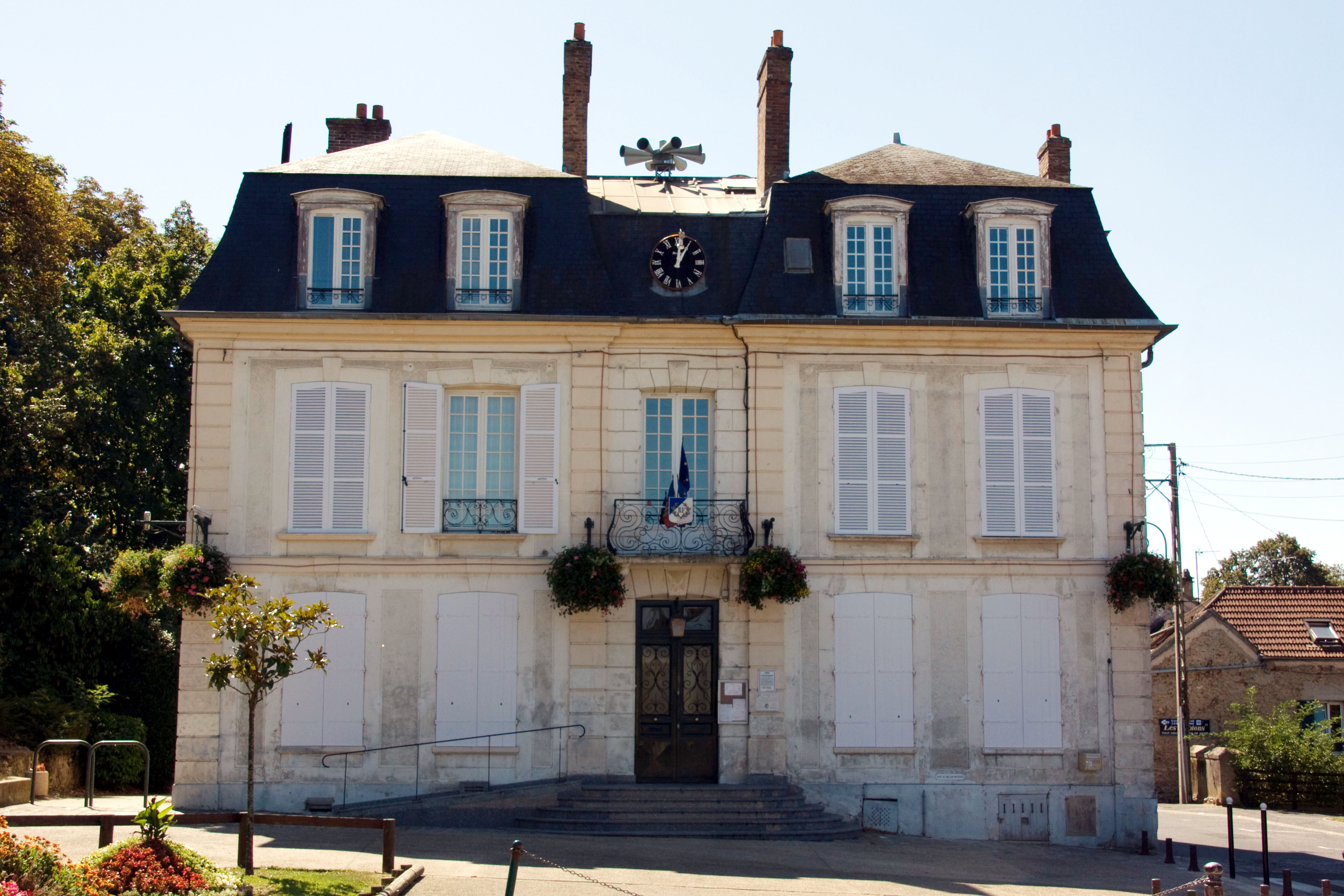
- The town hall in Saintry-sur-Seine

- Coat of arms
- Location of Saintry-sur-Seine
- Location within France Location within Île-de-France (region)
- Coordinates: 48°35′46″N 2°29′34″E
- Country: France
- Region: Île-de-France
- Department: Essonne
- Arrondissement: Évry
- Canton: Épinay-sous-Sénart
- Intercommunality: CA Grand Paris Sud Seine-Essonne-Sénart

Government
  - Mayor (2024–2026): Patrick Rauscher
- Area^{1}: 3.29 km^{2} (1.27 sq mi)
- Highest elevation: 92 m (302 ft)
- Lowest elevation: 32 m (105 ft)
- Population (2023): 5,882
  - Density: 1,790/km^{2} (4,630/sq mi)
- Time zone: UTC+01:00 (CET)
  - Summer (DST): UTC+02:00 (CEST)
- INSEE/Postal code: 91577 /91250
- ^{1} French Land Register data, which excludes lakes, ponds, glaciers > 1 km^{2} (0.386 sq mi or 247 acres) and river estuaries.

Saintry-sur-Seine (French pronunciation: [sɛ̃tʁi syʁ sɛn], literally Saintry on Seine) is a commune in the Essonne department in Île-de-France in northern France.

== Population ==
Inhabitants of Saintry-sur-Seine are known as Saintryens in French.

Historical population
Year	Pop.	±% p.a.
1968	1,909	—
1975	3,046	+6.90%
1982	3,642	+2.59%
1990	4,929	+3.85%
1999	4,998	+0.15%
2007	5,190	+0.47%
2012	5,193	+0.01%
2017	5,720	+1.95%
2023	5,882	+0.47%
Source: INSEE

== See also ==
- Communes of the Essonne department
