= Canton of Épinay-sous-Sénart =

Coordinates: 48.697°N 2.524°E

The canton of Épinay-sous-Sénart is an administrative division of the Essonne department, Île-de-France region, northern France. Its borders were modified at the French canton reorganisation which came into effect in March 2015. Its seat is in Épinay-sous-Sénart.

It consists of the following communes:

1. Boussy-Saint-Antoine
2. Brunoy (partly)
3. Épinay-sous-Sénart
4. Morsang-sur-Seine
5. Quincy-sous-Sénart
6. Saint-Pierre-du-Perray
7. Saintry-sur-Seine
8. Tigery
9. Varennes-Jarcy
