= Saint-Pierre-du-Perray =

Commune in Île-de-France, France

- Commune
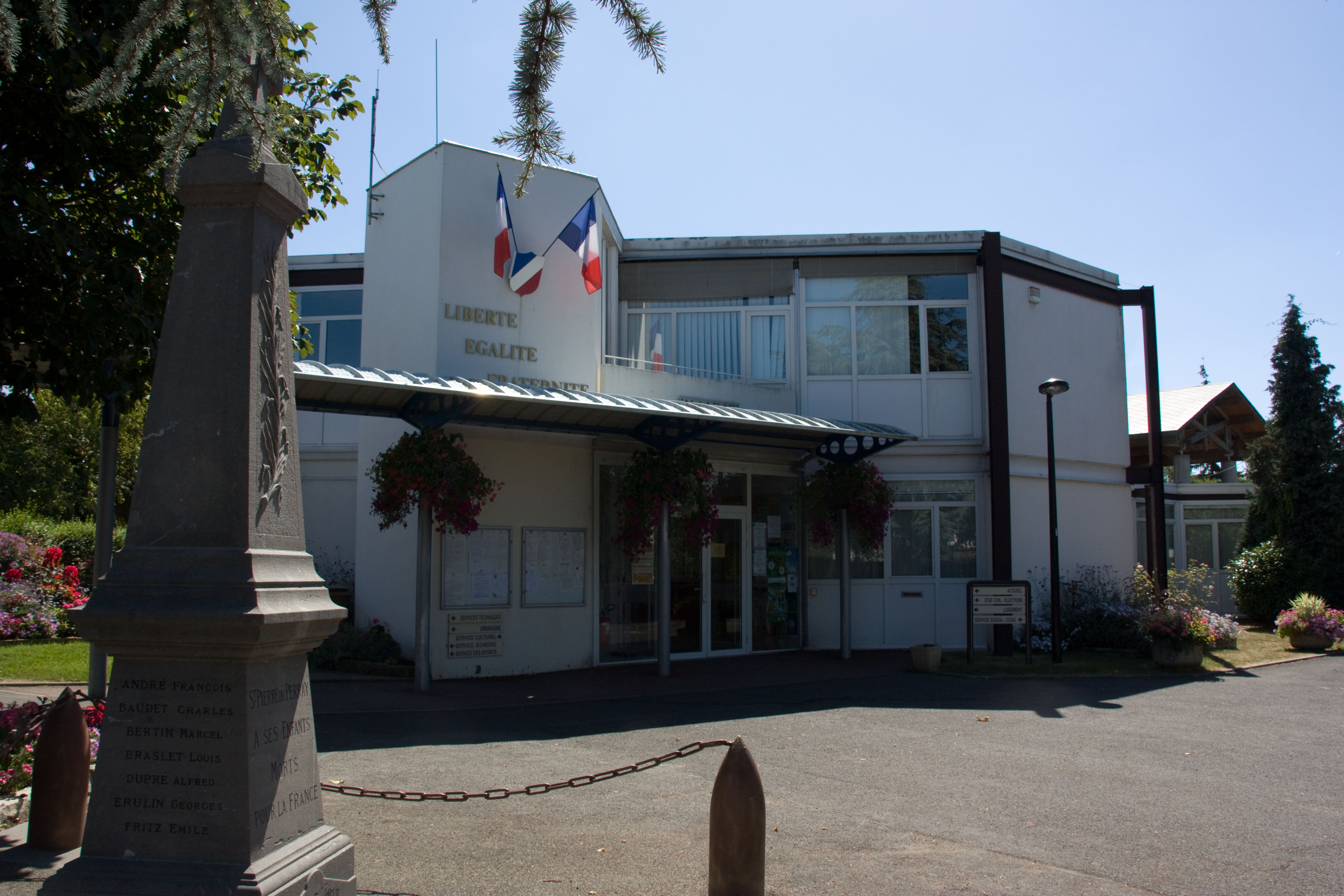
- The town hall in Saint-Pierre-du-Perray

- Coat of arms
- Location of Saint-Pierre-du-Perray
- Location within France Location within Île-de-France (region)
- Coordinates: 48°36′44″N 2°29′43″E
- Country: France
- Region: Île-de-France
- Department: Essonne
- Arrondissement: Évry
- Canton: Épinay-sous-Sénart
- Intercommunality: CA Grand Paris Sud Seine-Essonne-Sénart

Government
  - Mayor (2020–2026): Dominique Verots
- Area^{1}: 11.59 km^{2} (4.47 sq mi)
- Highest elevation: 93 m (305 ft)
- Lowest elevation: 32 m (105 ft)
- Population (2023): 11,993
  - Density: 1,035/km^{2} (2,680/sq mi)
- Time zone: UTC+01:00 (CET)
  - Summer (DST): UTC+02:00 (CEST)
- INSEE/Postal code: 91573 /91280
- ^{1} French Land Register data, which excludes lakes, ponds, glaciers > 1 km^{2} (0.386 sq mi or 247 acres) and river estuaries.

Saint-Pierre-du-Perray (French pronunciation: [sɛ̃ pjɛʁ dy pɛʁɛ]) is a commune in the Essonne department in Île-de-France in northern France.

== Population ==
Inhabitants of Saint-Pierre-du-Perray are known as Saint-Perreyens in French.

Historical population
| Year | Pop. | ±% p.a. |
|---|---|---|
| 1968 | 611 | — |
| 1975 | 1,360 | +12.11% |
| 1982 | 1,849 | +4.49% |
| 1990 | 3,342 | +7.68% |
| 1999 | 5,801 | +6.32% |
| 2007 | 7,818 | +3.80% |
| 2012 | 9,370 | +3.69% |
| 2017 | 10,835 | +2.95% |
| 2023 | 11,993 | +1.71% |
Source: INSEE

== See also ==
- Communes of the Essonne department
