= Morsang-sur-Seine =

Commune in Île-de-France, France

- Commune
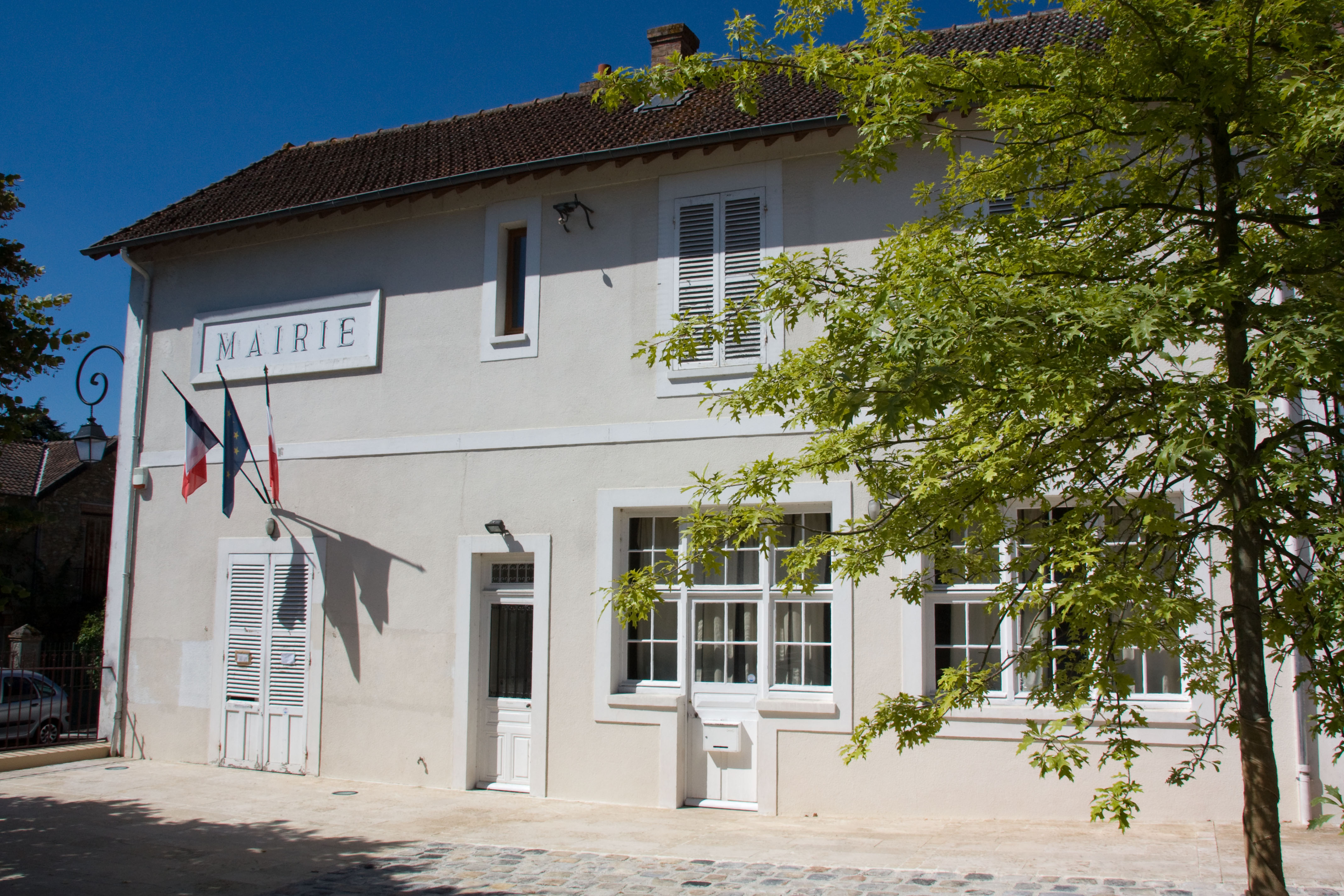
- The town hall in Morsang-sur-Seine

- Coat of arms
- Location of Morsang-sur-Seine
- Location within France Location within Île-de-France (region)
- Coordinates: 48°34′13″N 2°29′37″E
- Country: France
- Region: Île-de-France
- Department: Essonne
- Arrondissement: Évry
- Canton: Épinay-sous-Sénart
- Intercommunality: CA Grand Paris Sud Seine-Essonne-Sénart

Government
  - Mayor (2020–2026): Olivier Perrin
- Area^{1}: 4.39 km^{2} (1.69 sq mi)
- Highest elevation: 93 m (305 ft)
- Lowest elevation: 32 m (105 ft)
- Population (2023): 583
  - Density: 133/km^{2} (344/sq mi)
- Demonym: Morsandiaux
- Time zone: UTC+01:00 (CET)
  - Summer (DST): UTC+02:00 (CEST)
- INSEE/Postal code: 91435 /91250
- ^{1} French Land Register data, which excludes lakes, ponds, glaciers > 1 km^{2} (0.386 sq mi or 247 acres) and river estuaries.

Morsang-sur-Seine (French pronunciation: [mɔʁsɑ̃ syʁ sɛn]; lit. 'Morsang-on-Seine') is a rural commune in the Essonne department in Île-de-France in northern France. Inhabitants of Morsang-sur-Seine are known as Morsandiaux.

The orientalist Rubens Duval (1839–1911) was born in Morsang-sur-Seine.

== Geography ==
=== Situation ===
Located right bank of the Seine, on a bend of the Seine and backed by the forest of Rougeau, Morsang-sur-seine is a rural Department of Essonne.

Village life as naturally turned toward the river (plant water production, shipbuilding, water sports, camping, fishing) to the forest (logging, sports, hunting).

Type of occupation	Percentage	Area (in hectare)
Urban space builds	9,8 %	43,59
Urban no constructed	12,2 %	54,12
Rural space	78,0 %	347,18
Source : Iaurif

=== Climate ===
Morsang-sur-Seine, situated in Île-de-France, benefit from an oceanic climate fresh winters and soft summer, with regular precipitation on the whole year. On average annual, the temperature becomes established in 10,8 °C, with an annual maximal average of 15,2 °C and a minimal average of 6,4 °C. The record of the lowest temperature was established on January 17, 1985 with 19,8 °C. The slightest urban population density explains a constant negative difference from two to three degrees raised(found) between Auvernaux and Paris. The period of sunshine adding up 1 798 hours is comparable to all the regions in the North of the Loire but lesser than in the North of the department by the frequent presence of tablecloth of mist near the Seine, fields and vast forests. The precipitation become established in annual 598,3 millimeters, with a monthly average close to fifty millimeters and a point(headland) in sixty three millimeters in May.

== See also ==
- Communes of the Essonne department
