= 2011 Nürburgring GP3 Series round =

(Germany) 2011 German GP3 round
Round details
- Round 5 of 8 rounds in the 2011 GP3 Series
- Location: Nürburgring, Nürburg, Germany
- Course: Permanent racing facility 5.148 km (3.199 mi)

GP3 Series

Race 1
- Date: 23 July 2011
- Laps: 15

Pole position
| Driver | (New Zealand) Mitch Evans | MW Arden |
- Time: 1:49.366

Podium
| First | (Indonesia) Rio Haryanto | Marussia Manor Racing |
| Second | (United Kingdom) Lewis Williamson | MW Arden |
| Third | (Finland) Valtteri Bottas | Lotus ART |

Fastest lap
| Driver | (United Kingdom) Lewis Williamson | MW Arden |
- Time: 1:50.985

Race 2
- Date: 24 July 2011
- Laps: 14 (15 scheduled)

Podium
| First | (Finland) Valtteri Bottas | Lotus ART |
| Second | (United Kingdom) Alexander Sims | Status Grand Prix |
| Third | (Netherlands) Nigel Melker | RSC Mücke Motorsport |

Fastest lap
| Driver | (Netherlands) Nigel Melker | RSC Mücke Motorsport |
- Time: 2:07.892 (on lap 12)

The 2011 Nürburgring GP3 Series round was a GP3 Series motor race held on July 23 and 24, 2011 at Nürburgring, Germany. It is the fifth round of the 2011 GP3 Series. The race supported the 2011 German Grand Prix.

== Classification ==
=== Race 1 ===
| Pos | No. | Driver | Team | Laps | Time/Retired | Grid | Points |
|---|---|---|---|---|---|---|---|
| 1 | 11 | (Indonesia) Rio Haryanto | Marussia Manor Racing | 15 | 29:48.703 | 3 | 10 |
| 2 | 28 | (United Kingdom) Lewis Williamson | MW Arden | 15 | +2.404 | 8 | 8+1 |
| 3 | 2 | (Finland) Valtteri Bottas | Lotus ART | 15 | +3.183 | 11 | 6 |
| 4 | 3 | (United Kingdom) James Calado | Lotus ART | 15 | +3.611 | 9 | 5 |
| 5 | 10 | (United Kingdom) Adrian Quaife-Hobbs | Marussia Manor Racing | 15 | +4.948 | 6 | 4 |
| 6 | 14 | (United States) Conor Daly | Carlin | 15 | +18.223 | 16 | 3 |
| 7 | 17 | (Finland) Aaro Vainio | Tech 1 Racing | 15 | +19.692 | 5 | 2 |
| 8 | 19 | (Hungary) Tamás Pál Kiss | Tech 1 Racing | 15 | +21.387 | 18 | 1 |
| 9 | 27 | (Switzerland) Simon Trummer | MW Arden | 15 | +23.635 | 13 | |
| 10 | 31 | (Netherlands) Nigel Melker | RSC Mücke Motorsport | 15 | +32.818 | 27 | |
| 11 | 6 | (Russia) Ivan Lukashevich | Status Grand Prix | 15 | +37.554 | 24 | |
| 12 | 4 | (United Kingdom) Alexander Sims | Status Grand Prix | 15 | +39.025 | 7 | |
| 13 | 9 | (Italy) Vittorio Ghirelli | Jenzer Motorsport | 15 | +44.359 | 20 | |
| 14 | 12 | (Finland) Matias Laine | Marussia Manor Racing | 15 | +47.159 | 23 | |
| 15 | 7 | (Switzerland) Nico Müller | Jenzer Motorsport | 15 | +51.928 | 19 | |
| 16 | 21 | (United Kingdom) Nick Yelloly | ATECH CRS GP | 15 | +59.456 | 21 | |
| 17 | 16 | (Brazil) Leonardo Cordeiro | Carlin | 15 | +1:01.306 | 29 | |
| 18 | 18 | (Netherlands) Thomas Hylkema | Tech 1 Racing | 15 | +1:05.865 | 30 | |
| 19 | 26 | (New Zealand) Mitch Evans | MW Arden | 15 | +1:09.673 | 1 | 2 |
| 20 | 8 | (Russia) Maxim Zimin | Jenzer Motorsport | 15 | +1:20.469 | 26 | |
| 21 | 22 | (Switzerland) Zoël Amberg | ATECH CRS GP | 15 | +1:22.044 | 10 | |
| 22 | 23 | (France) Tom Dillmann | Addax Team | 15 | +1:22.921 | 4 | |
| 23 | 1 | (Brazil) Pedro Nunes | Lotus ART | 15 | +1:29.296^{5} | 17 | |
| 24 | 25 | (United Kingdom) Dean Smith | Addax Team | 15 | +1:39.214 | 25 | |
| 25 | 29 | (United Kingdom) Luciano Bacheta | RSC Mücke Motorsport | 15 | +3:22.519 | 12 | |
| 26 | 30 | (Denmark) Michael Christensen | RSC Mücke Motorsport | 14 | Retired | 14 | |
| 27 | 24 | (Colombia) Gabriel Chaves | Addax Team | 14 | Retired | 15 | |
| 28 | 5 | (Portugal) António Félix da Costa | Status Grand Prix | 14 | +1 lap | 2 | |
| 29 | 15 | (United Kingdom) Callum MacLeod | Carlin | 14 | +1 lap | 28 | |
| Ret | 20 | (Philippines) Marlon Stöckinger | ATECH CRS GP | 11 | Retired | 22 | |
Fastest lap: Lewis Williamson (MW Arden) 1:50.985

Notes

- ^5 – Nunes was penalised after the race with a 20-second addition to his race time for causing a collision.

=== Race 2 ===
| Pos | No. | Driver | Team | Laps | Time/Retired | Grid | Points |
|---|---|---|---|---|---|---|---|
| 1 | 2 | (Finland) Valtteri Bottas | Lotus ART | 14 | 30:25.297 | 6 | 6 |
| 2 | 4 | (United Kingdom) Alexander Sims | Status Grand Prix | 14 | +1.473 | 12 | 5 |
| 3 | 31 | (Netherlands) Nigel Melker | RSC Mücke Motorsport | 14 | +2.717 | 10 | 4+1 |
| 4 | 19 | (Hungary) Tamás Pál Kiss | Tech 1 Racing | 14 | +21.550 | 1 | 3 |
| 5 | 23 | (France) Tom Dillmann | Addax Team | 14 | +24.379 | 22 | 2 |
| 6 | 3 | (United Kingdom) James Calado | Lotus ART | 14 | +32.578 | 5 | 1 |
| 7 | 7 | (Switzerland) Nico Müller | Jenzer Motorsport | 14 | +34.073 | 15 | |
| 8 | 14 | (United States) Conor Daly | Carlin | 14 | +39.255 | 3 | |
| 9 | 21 | (United Kingdom) Nick Yelloly | ATECH CRS GP | 14 | +44.551 | 16 | |
| 10 | 11 | (Indonesia) Rio Haryanto | Marussia Manor Racing | 14 | +46.898 | 8 | |
| 11 | 9 | (Italy) Vittorio Ghirelli | Jenzer Motorsport | 14 | +49.147 | 13 | |
| 12 | 30 | (Denmark) Michael Christensen | RSC Mücke Motorsport | 14 | +50.967 | 26 | |
| 13 | 17 | (Finland) Aaro Vainio | Tech 1 Racing | 14 | +51.244 | 2 | |
| 14 | 28 | (United Kingdom) Lewis Williamson | MW Arden | 14 | +54.054 | 7 | |
| 15 | 8 | (Russia) Maxim Zimin | Jenzer Motorsport | 14 | +56.964 | 20 | |
| 16 | 27 | (Switzerland) Simon Trummer | MW Arden | 14 | +59.224 | 9 | |
| 17 | 24 | (Colombia) Gabriel Chaves | Addax Team | 14 | +1:00.668 | 27 | |
| 18 | 6 | (Russia) Ivan Lukashevich | Status Grand Prix | 14 | +1:03.961 | 11 | |
| 19 | 16 | (Brazil) Leonardo Cordeiro | Carlin | 14 | +1:11.060 | 17 | |
| 20 | 22 | (Switzerland) Zoël Amberg | ATECH CRS GP | 14 | +1:18.562 | 21 | |
| 21 | 15 | (United Kingdom) Callum MacLeod | Carlin | 14 | +1:18.647 | 29 | |
| 22 | 26 | (New Zealand) Mitch Evans | MW Arden | 14 | +1:42.208 | 19 | |
| 23 | 12 | (Finland) Matias Laine | Marussia Manor Racing | 14 | +2:04.432 | 14 | |
| 24 | 18 | (Netherlands) Thomas Hylkema | Tech 1 Racing | 13 | Spun off | 18 | |
| 25 | 29 | (United Kingdom) Luciano Bacheta | RSC Mücke Motorsport | 13 | 1 Lap | 25 | |
| Ret | 1 | (Brazil) Pedro Nunes | Lotus ART | 11 | Retired | 23 | |
| Ret | 5 | (Portugal) António Félix da Costa | Status Grand Prix | 7 | Retired | 28 | |
| Ret | 10 | (United Kingdom) Adrian Quaife-Hobbs | Marussia Manor Racing | 5 | Retired | 4 | |
| Ret | 25 | (United Kingdom) Dean Smith | Addax Team | 1 | Collision | 24 | |
| DNS | 20 | (Philippines) Marlon Stöckinger | ATECH CRS GP | 0 | Not started | 30 | |
Fastest lap: Nigel Melker (RSC Mücke Motorsport) 2:07.892 (lap 12)

== Standings after the round ==
Drivers' Championship standings

| Pos | Driver | Points |
|---|---|---|
| 1 | (United Kingdom) Alexander Sims | 34 |
| 2 | (United Kingdom) Lewis Williamson | 28 |
| 3 | (New Zealand) Mitch Evans | 28 |
| 4 | (United Kingdom) James Calado | 27 |
| 5 | (Netherlands) Nigel Melker | 27 |

Teams' Championship standings

| Pos | Team | Points |
|---|---|---|
| 1 | (Australia) MW Arden | 56 |
| 2 | (France) Lotus ART | 51 |
| 3 | (Republic of Ireland) Status Grand Prix | 41 |
| 4 | (France) Tech 1 Racing | 39 |
| 5 | (Germany) RSC Mücke Motorsport | 38 |

- Note: Only the top five positions are included for both sets of standings.

== See also ==
- 2011 German Grand Prix
- 2011 Nürburgring GP2 Series round

| Previous round: 2011 Silverstone GP3 Series round | GP3 Series; 2011 season | Next round: 2011 Hungaroring GP3 Series round |
| Previous round: 2010 Hockenheimring GP3 Series round | German GP3 round | Next round: 2012 Hockenheimring GP3 Series round |
