= 2011 Silverstone GP3 Series round =

(United Kingdom) 2011 Silverstone GP3 round
Round details
- Round 4 of 8 rounds in the 2011 GP3 Series
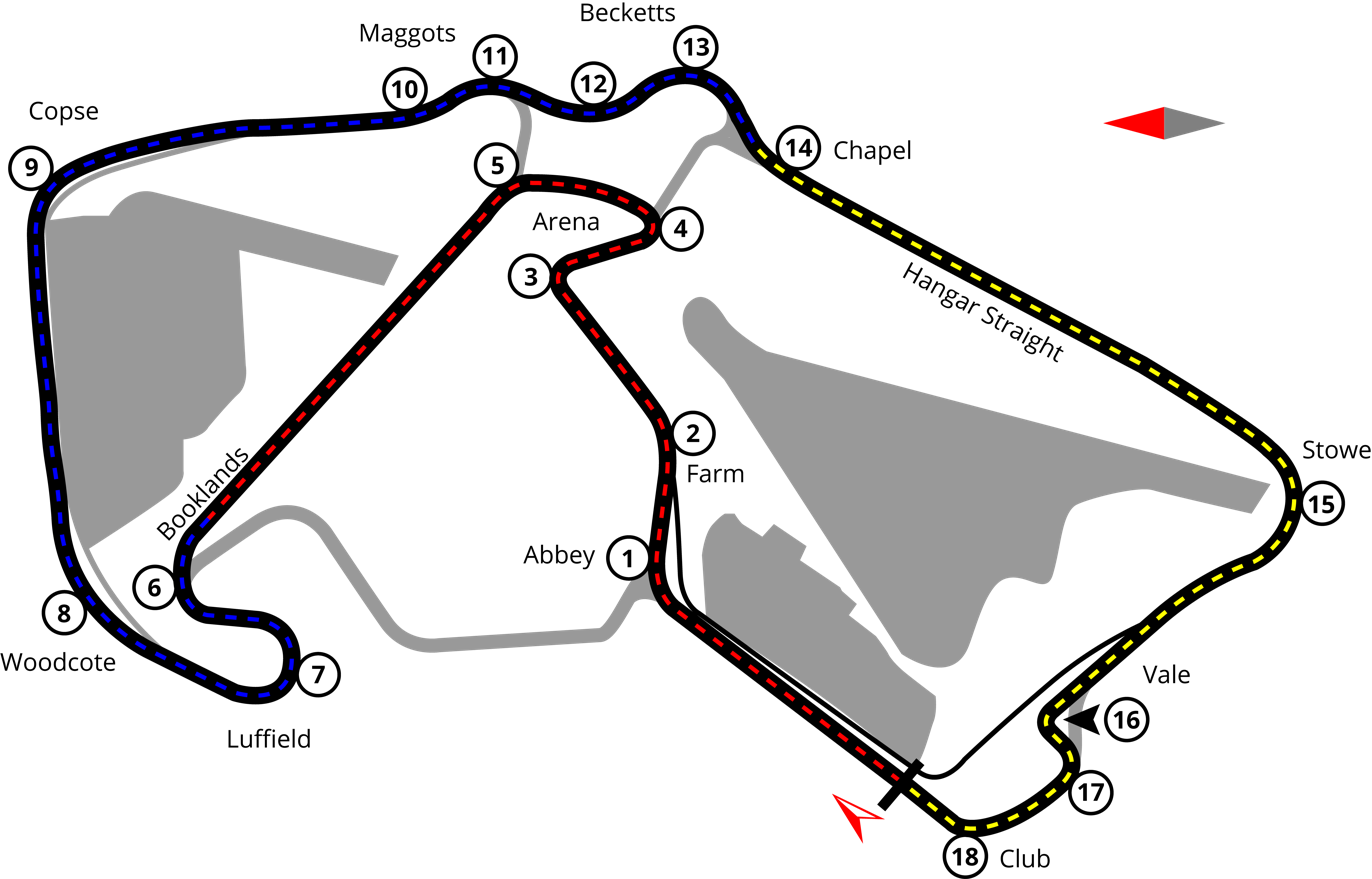
- Silverstone Circuit
- Location: Silverstone Circuit; Northamptonshire, England
- Course: Permanent racing facility 5.901 km (3.667 mi)

GP3 Series

Race 1
- Date: 9 July 2011
- Laps: 14

Pole position
Driver	(United Kingdom) Adrian Quaife-Hobbs	Marussia Manor Racing
- Time: 1:51.190

Podium
First	(Switzerland) Nico Müller	Jenzer Motorsport
Second	(United Kingdom) Alexander Sims	Status Grand Prix
Third	(United Kingdom) Nick Yelloly	ATECH CRS GP

Fastest lap
Driver	(United Kingdom) Alexander Sims	Status Grand Prix
- Time: 2:05.985

Race 2
- Date: 10 July 2011
- Laps: 14

Podium
First	(United Kingdom) Lewis Williamson	MW Arden
Second	(United Kingdom) Dean Smith	Addax Team
Third	(United Kingdom) Alexander Sims	Status Grand Prix

Fastest lap
Driver	(United Kingdom) Adrian Quaife-Hobbs	Marussia Manor Racing
- Time: 1:52.916

The 2011 Silverstone GP3 Series round was a GP3 Series motor race held on 9 and 10 July 2011 at Silverstone Circuit in Silverstone, United Kingdom. It was the fourth round of the 2011 GP3 Series. The race supported the 2011 British Grand Prix.

== Classification ==
=== Race 1 ===
Pos	No.	Driver	Team	Laps	Time/Retired	Grid	Points
1	7	(Switzerland) Nico Müller	Jenzer Motorsport	14	30:40.239	6	10
2	4	(United Kingdom) Alexander Sims	Status Grand Prix	14	+2.814	5^{5}	8+1
3	21	(United Kingdom) Nick Yelloly	ATECH CRS GP	14	+4.751	18	6
4	10	(United Kingdom) Adrian Quaife-Hobbs	Marussia Manor Racing	14	+7.400	1^{5}	5+2
5	29	(United Kingdom) Luciano Bacheta	RSC Mücke Motorsport	14	+15.227	23	4
6	3	(United Kingdom) James Calado	Lotus ART	14	+18.644	2^{5}	3
7	28	(United Kingdom) Lewis Williamson	MW Arden	14	+19.315	3^{5}	2
8	25	(United Kingdom) Dean Smith	Addax Team	14	+24.705	25	1
9	26	(New Zealand) Mitch Evans	MW Arden	14	+27.838	4^{5}	
10	11	(Indonesia) Rio Haryanto	Marussia Manor Racing	14	+29.706	17^{4} ^{5}	
11	17	(Finland) Aaro Vainio	Tech 1 Racing	14	+30.351	12^{5}	
12	27	(Switzerland) Simon Trummer	MW Arden	14	+31.185	14^{5}	
13	14	(United States) Conor Daly	Carlin	14	+35.791	29^{5}	
14	9	(Italy) Vittorio Ghirelli	Jenzer Motorsport	14	+40.397	19	
15	2	(Finland) Valtteri Bottas	Lotus ART	14	+54.998	7^{5}	
16	20	(Philippines) Marlon Stöckinger	ATECH CRS GP	14	+57.352^{6}	21	
17	16	(Brazil) Leonardo Cordeiro	Carlin	14	+1:18.171	28^{5}	
18	6	(Russia) Ivan Lukashevich	Status Grand Prix	14	+1:20.044	20^{5}	
19	5	(Portugal) António Félix da Costa	Status Grand Prix	14	+1:43.499	9^{5}	
20	18	(Netherlands) Thomas Hylkema	Tech 1 Racing	13	+1 lap	30^{4} ^{5}	
DSQ	8	(Russia) Maxim Zimin	Jenzer Motorsport	14	Disqualified^{7}	15	
Ret	23	(France) Tom Dillmann	Addax Team	11	Spun off	8^{5}	
Ret	24	(Colombia) Gabriel Chaves	Addax Team	11	Spun off	11^{5}	
Ret	22	(Switzerland) Zoël Amberg	ATECH CRS GP	8		27	
Ret	1	(Brazil) Pedro Nunes	Lotus ART	3		26	
Ret	30	(Denmark) Michael Christensen	RSC Mücke Motorsport	1	Collision	10	
Ret	19	(Hungary) Tamás Pál Kiss	Tech 1 Racing	1		13^{5}	
Ret	31	(Netherlands) Nigel Melker	RSC Mücke Motorsport	0	Collision	16^{4}	
Ret	12	(Finland) Matias Laine	Marussia Manor Racing	0	Accident	24^{4}	
DNS	15	(Canada) Daniel Morad	Carlin			22	
Fastest lap: Alexander Sims (Status Grand Prix) 2:05.985

Notes

1. – Ten grid position penalty for Laine (ignoring yellow flag during free practice); the same penalty to Haryanto, Melker and Hylkema (causing collisions during Race 2 in Valencia).
2. – Most drivers elected to start the warm-up lap with slicks. Due to increasing rain, several drivers pitted for wet-weather tyres from the warm-up lap.
3. – Stöckinger was given a 30 seconds time penalty after the race for ignoring yellow flags.
4. – Zimin was excluded from the race results because of forcing Laine off the track; Zimin was also suspended from Race 2.

=== Race 2 ===
Pos	No.	Driver	Team	Laps	Time/Retired	Grid	Points
1	28	(United Kingdom) Lewis Williamson	MW Arden	14	26:51.435	2	6
2	25	(United Kingdom) Dean Smith	Addax Team	14	+5.090	1	5+1
3	4	(United Kingdom) Alexander Sims	Status Grand Prix	14	+7.202	7	4
4	11	(Indonesia) Rio Haryanto	Marussia Manor Racing	14	+8.178	10	3
5	3	(United Kingdom) James Calado	Lotus ART	14	+11.238	3	2
6	21	(United Kingdom) Nick Yelloly	ATECH CRS GP	14	+11.619	6	1
7	14	(United States) Conor Daly	Carlin	14	+12.080	13	
8	31	(Netherlands) Nigel Melker	RSC Mücke Motorsport	14	+13.051	27	
9	5	(Portugal) António Félix da Costa	Status Grand Prix	14	+14.660	19	
10	27	(Switzerland) Simon Trummer	MW Arden	14	+20.947	12	
11	7	(Switzerland) Nico Müller	Jenzer Motorsport	14	+22.574	8	
12	2	(Finland) Valtteri Bottas	Lotus ART	14	+23.987	15	
13	30	(Denmark) Michael Christensen	RSC Mücke Motorsport	14	+25.338	25	
14	24	(Colombia) Gabriel Chaves	Addax Team	14	+30.864	22	
15	10	(United Kingdom) Adrian Quaife-Hobbs	Marussia Manor Racing	14	+32.965	5	
16	22	(Switzerland) Zoël Amberg	ATECH CRS GP	14	+35.349	23	
17	1	(Brazil) Pedro Nunes	Lotus ART	14	+37.013	24	
18	17	(Finland) Aaro Vainio	Tech 1 Racing	14	+38.579	11	
19	29	(United Kingdom) Luciano Bacheta	RSC Mücke Motorsport	14	+39.642	4	
20	19	(Hungary) Tamás Pál Kiss	Tech 1 Racing	14	+41.457	26	
21	18	(Netherlands) Thomas Hylkema	Tech 1 Racing	14	+41.759	20	
22	9	(Italy) Vittorio Ghirelli	Jenzer Motorsport	14	+42.038	14	
23	16	(Brazil) Leonardo Cordeiro	Carlin	14	+45.566	17	
24	6	(Russia) Ivan Lukashevich	Status Grand Prix	14	+49.993	18	
25	23	(France) Tom Dillmann	Addax Team	13	Retired	21	
Ret	20	(Philippines) Marlon Stöckinger	ATECH CRS GP	8	Spun off	16	
Ret	12	(Finland) Matias Laine	Marussia Manor Racing	3	Retired	28	
Ret	26	(New Zealand) Mitch Evans	MW Arden	0	Retired	9	
DNS	15	(Canada) Daniel Morad	Carlin				
EX	8	(Russia) Maxim Zimin	Jenzer Motorsport		Excluded		
Fastest lap: Adrian Quaife-Hobbs (Marussia Manor Racing) 1:52.916

== Standings after the round ==
Drivers' Championship standings

Pos	Driver	Points
1	(United Kingdom) Alexander Sims	29
2	(New Zealand) Mitch Evans	26
3	(Netherlands) Nigel Melker	22
4	(United Kingdom) James Calado	21
5	(Italy) Andrea Caldarelli	20

Teams' Championship standings

Pos	Team	Points
1	(Australia) MW Arden	45
2	(Republic of Ireland) Status Grand Prix	36
3	(Germany) RSC Mücke Motorsport	33
4	(France) Tech 1 Racing	33
5	(France) Lotus ART	33

- Note: Only the top five positions are included for both sets of standings.

== See also ==
- 2011 British Grand Prix
- 2011 Silverstone GP2 Series round

Previous round: 2011 Valencia GP3 Series round	GP3 Series; 2011 season	Next round: 2011 Nürburgring GP3 Series round
Previous round: 2010 Silverstone GP3 Series round	British GP3 round	Next round: 2012 Silverstone GP3 Series round
