= 2011 Hungaroring GP3 Series round =

Motor racing competition

(Hungary) 2011 Hungaroring GP3 round
Round details
- Round 6 of 8 rounds in the 2011 GP3 Series
- Location: Hungaroring, Mogyoród, Pest, Hungary
- Course: Permanent racing facility 4.381 km (2.724 mi)

GP3 Series

Race 1
- Date: 30 July 2011
- Laps: 16

Pole position
Driver	(Finland) Valtteri Bottas	Lotus ART
- Time: 1:36.763

Podium
First	(Finland) Valtteri Bottas	Lotus ART
Second	(Denmark) Michael Christensen	RSC Mücke Motorsport
Third	(United Kingdom) Adrian Quaife-Hobbs	Marussia Manor Racing

Fastest lap
Driver	(Denmark) Michael Christensen	RSC Mücke Motorsport
- Time: 1:38.664

Race 2
- Date: 31 July 2011
- Laps: 14 (16 scheduled)

Podium
First	(Indonesia) Rio Haryanto	Marussia Manor Racing
Second	(Finland) Valtteri Bottas	Lotus ART
Third	(United Kingdom) James Calado	Lotus ART

Fastest lap
Driver	(Netherlands) Nigel Melker	RSC Mücke Motorsport
- Time: 1:59.057 (on lap 8)

The 2011 Hungaroring GP3 Series round was a GP3 Series motor race held on July 30 and 31, 2011 at Hungaroring, Hungary. It was the sixth round of the 2011 GP3 Series. The race supported the 2011 Hungarian Grand Prix.

== Classification ==
=== Race 1 ===
Pos	No.	Driver	Team	Laps	Time/Retired	Grid	Points
1	2	(Finland) Valtteri Bottas	Lotus ART	16	26:32.020	1	10+2
2	30	(Denmark) Michael Christensen	RSC Mücke Motorsport	16	+0.986	5	8+1
3	10	(United Kingdom) Adrian Quaife-Hobbs	Marussia Manor Racing	16	+9.203	9	6
4	7	(Switzerland) Nico Müller	Jenzer Motorsport	16	+10.218	7	5
5	17	(Finland) Aaro Vainio	Tech 1 Racing	16	+11.243	4	4
6	28	(United Kingdom) Lewis Williamson	MW Arden	16	+11.522	15	3
7	23	(France) Tom Dillmann	Addax Team	16	+15.454	8	2
8	31	(Netherlands) Nigel Melker	RSC Mücke Motorsport	16	+15.820	14	1
9	11	(Indonesia) Rio Haryanto	Marussia Manor Racing	16	+16.404	6	
10	19	(Hungary) Tamás Pál Kiss	Tech 1 Racing	16	+26.154	18	
11	5	(Portugal) António Félix da Costa	Status Grand Prix	16	+28.358	22	
12	20	(Philippines) Marlon Stöckinger	ATECH CRS GP	16	+31.399	17	
13	14	(United States) Conor Daly	Carlin	16	+34.130	13	
14	12	(Finland) Matias Laine	Marussia Manor Racing	16	+37.376	16	
15	22	(Switzerland) Zoël Amberg	ATECH CRS GP	16	+40.368	19	
16	27	(Switzerland) Simon Trummer	MW Arden	16	+40.629	12	
17	29	(United Kingdom) Luciano Bacheta	RSC Mücke Motorsport	16	+41.510	20	
18	1	(Brazil) Pedro Nunes	Lotus ART	16	+42.932	10	
19	8	(Russia) Maxim Zimin	Jenzer Motorsport	16	+43.295	24	
20	16	(Brazil) Leonardo Cordeiro	Carlin	16	+43.596	27	
21	21	(United Kingdom) Nick Yelloly	ATECH CRS GP	16	+44.355	25	
22	9	(Italy) Vittorio Ghirelli	Jenzer Motorsport	16	+44.443	26	
23	24	(Colombia) Gabriel Chaves	Addax Team	16	+44.630	30	
24	25	(United Kingdom) Dean Smith	Addax Team	16	+45.325	21	
25	3	(United Kingdom) James Calado	Lotus ART	16	+45.831	2	
26	15	(United Kingdom) Callum MacLeod	Carlin	16	+46.747	28	
27	18	(Netherlands) Thomas Hylkema	Tech 1 Racing	16	+47.330	29	
28	6	(Russia) Ivan Lukashevich	Status Grand Prix	15	+1 lap	23	
DSQ	4	(United Kingdom) Alexander Sims	Status Grand Prix	16	Disqualified^{4}	11	
Ret	26	(New Zealand) Mitch Evans	MW Arden	1	Collision damage	3	
Fastest lap: Michael Christensen (RSC Mücke Motorsport) 1:38.664

Notes

- ^4 – Sims was Disqualified from Race 1 results because his car did not comply with the technical regulations.

=== Race 2 ===
Pos	No.	Driver	Team	Laps	Time/Retired	Grid	Points
1	11	(Indonesia) Rio Haryanto	Marussia Manor Racing	14	30:06.456	9	6
2	2	(Finland) Valtteri Bottas	Lotus ART	14	+1.344	8	5
3	3	(United Kingdom) James Calado	Lotus ART	14	+3.799	25	4
4	31	(Netherlands) Nigel Melker	RSC Mücke Motorsport	14	+5.264	1	3+1
5	7	(Switzerland) Nico Müller	Jenzer Motorsport	14	+7.158	5	2
6	5	(Portugal) António Félix da Costa	Status Grand Prix	14	+9.991	11	1
7	17	(Finland) Aaro Vainio	Tech 1 Racing	14	+10.741	4	
8	8	(Russia) Maxim Zimin	Jenzer Motorsport	14	+11.336	19	
9	4	(United Kingdom) Alexander Sims	Status Grand Prix	14	+13.059	30	
10	10	(United Kingdom) Adrian Quaife-Hobbs	Marussia Manor Racing	14	+13.339	6	
11	14	(United States) Conor Daly	Carlin	14	+15.057	13	
12	27	(Switzerland) Simon Trummer	MW Arden	14	+16.949	16	
13	30	(Denmark) Michael Christensen	RSC Mücke Motorsport	14	+18.071	7	
14	1	(Brazil) Pedro Nunes	Lotus ART	14	+19.075	18	
15	16	(Brazil) Leonardo Cordeiro	Carlin	14	+19.986	20	
16	22	(Switzerland) Zoël Amberg	ATECH CRS GP	14	+21.114	15	
17	20	(Philippines) Marlon Stöckinger	ATECH CRS GP	14	+21.636	12	
18	15	(United Kingdom) Callum MacLeod	Carlin	14	+22.551	26	
19	25	(United Kingdom) Dean Smith	Addax Team	14	+22.845	24	
20	19	(Hungary) Tamás Pál Kiss	Tech 1 Racing	14	+25.458	10	
21	12	(Finland) Matias Laine	Marussia Manor Racing	14	+27.214	14	
22	23	(France) Tom Dillmann	Addax Team	14	+28.808^{5}	2	
23	6	(Russia) Ivan Lukashevich	Status Grand Prix	14	+42.863	28	
24	26	(New Zealand) Mitch Evans	MW Arden	12	Retired	29	
Ret	18	(Netherlands) Thomas Hylkema	Tech 1 Racing	9	Retired	27	
Ret	29	(United Kingdom) Luciano Bacheta	RSC Mücke Motorsport	8	Retired	17	
Ret	21	(United Kingdom) Nick Yelloly	ATECH CRS GP	2	Retired	21	
Ret	28	(United Kingdom) Lewis Williamson	MW Arden	1	Retired	3	
Ret	9	(Italy) Vittorio Ghirelli	Jenzer Motorsport	1	Retired	22	
Ret	24	(Colombia) Gabriel Chaves	Addax Team	0	Retired	23	
Fastest lap: Nigel Melker (RSC Mücke Motorsport) 1:59.057 (on lap 8)

Notes

- ^5 – Dillmann received a twenty-second penalty after the race for not respecting the track limits and gaining an advantage whilst trying to overtake under yellow waved flags.

== Standings after the round ==
Drivers' Championship standings

Pos	Driver	Points
1	(Finland) Valtteri Bottas	41
2	(United Kingdom) Alexander Sims	34
3	(Netherlands) Nigel Melker	32
4	(United Kingdom) Lewis Williamson	31
5	(United Kingdom) James Calado	31

Teams' Championship standings

Pos	Team	Points
1	(France) Lotus ART	72
2	(Australia) MW Arden	59
3	(Germany) RSC Mücke Motorsport	52
4	(United Kingdom) Marussia Manor Racing	47
5	(France) Tech 1 Racing	43

- Note: Only the top five positions are included for both sets of standings.

== See also ==
- 2011 Hungarian Grand Prix
- 2011 Hungaroring GP2 Series round

Previous round: 2011 Nürburgring GP3 Series round	GP3 Series; 2011 season	Next round: 2011 Spa-Francorchamps GP3 Series round
Previous round: 2010 Hungaroring GP3 Series round	Hungarian GP3 round	Next round: 2012 Hungaroring GP3 Series round
