= Rio Haryanto =

Indonesian racing driver (born 1993)

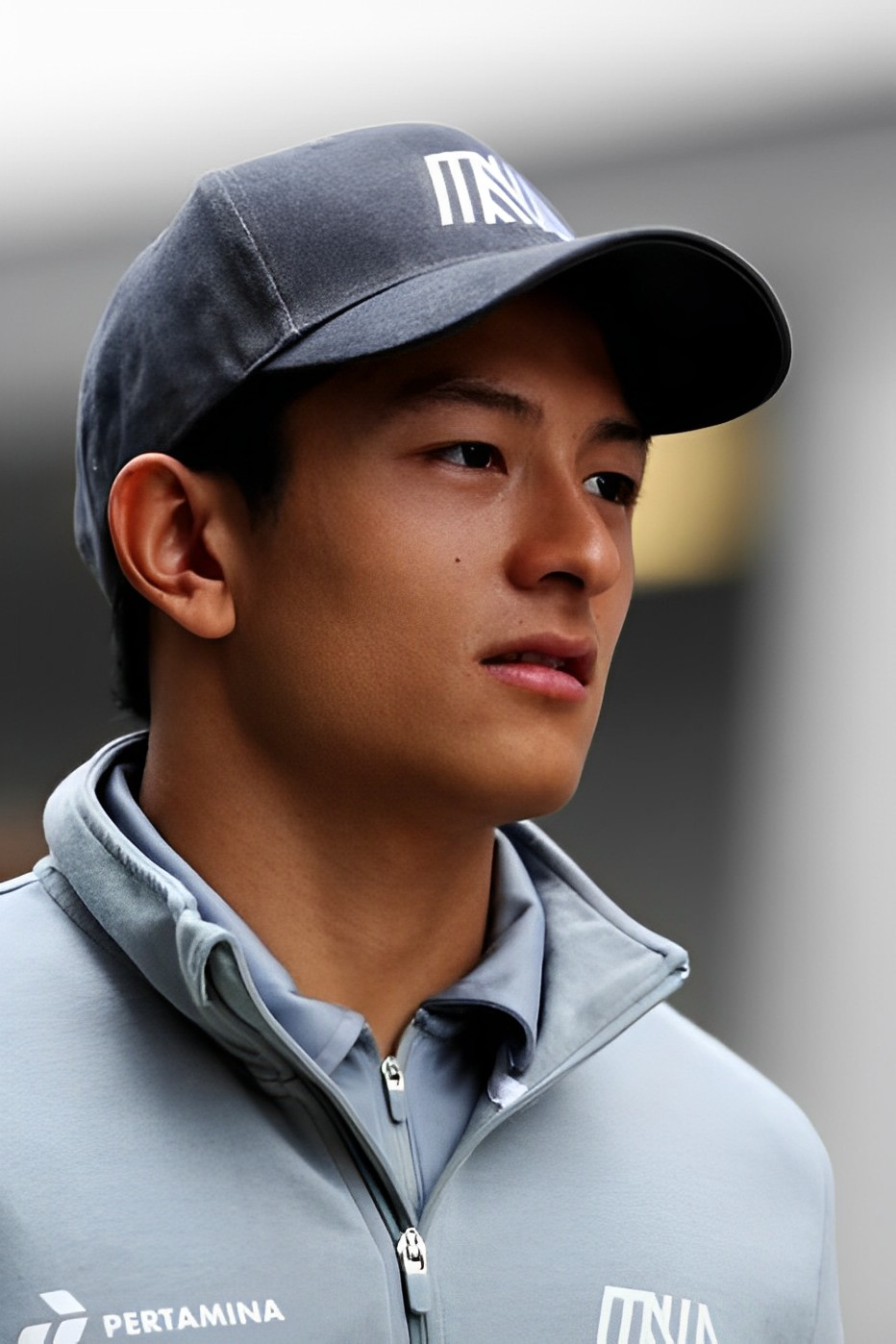
- Haryanto at the 2016 Russian Grand Prix
- Born: 22 January 1993 (age 33); Surakarta, Central Java, Indonesia

Formula One World Championship career
- Nationality: (Indonesia) Indonesian
- Active years: 2016
- Team: Manor
- Car number: 88
- Entries: 12 (12 starts)
- Championships: 0
- Wins: 0
- Podiums: 0
- Career points: 0
- Pole positions: 0
- Fastest laps: 0
- First entry: 2016 Australian Grand Prix
- Last entry: 2016 German Grand Prix

Previous series
- 2019–2020 2019 2012–2015 2010–2011 2011 2008–2009 2009 2009 2008–2009 2008: Asian Le Mans Series; GTWC Asia; GP2 Series; GP3 Series; Auto GP; Formula BMW Pacific; Australian F3; Formula BMW Europe; Asian Formula Renault; Formula Asia 2.0

Championship titles
- 2009: Formula BMW Pacific

Rio Haryanto (born 22 January 1993) is an Indonesian former racing driver who competed in Formula One in 2016. As of 2026, Haryanto remains the only Indonesian driver to compete in Formula One.

Born and raised in Surakarta, Haryanto began his career in karting, winning multiple continental championships before progressing to junior formulae in 2008. He won his first title at the Formula BMW Pacific Championship in 2009 with Meritus.

== Early career ==
=== Asian series ===
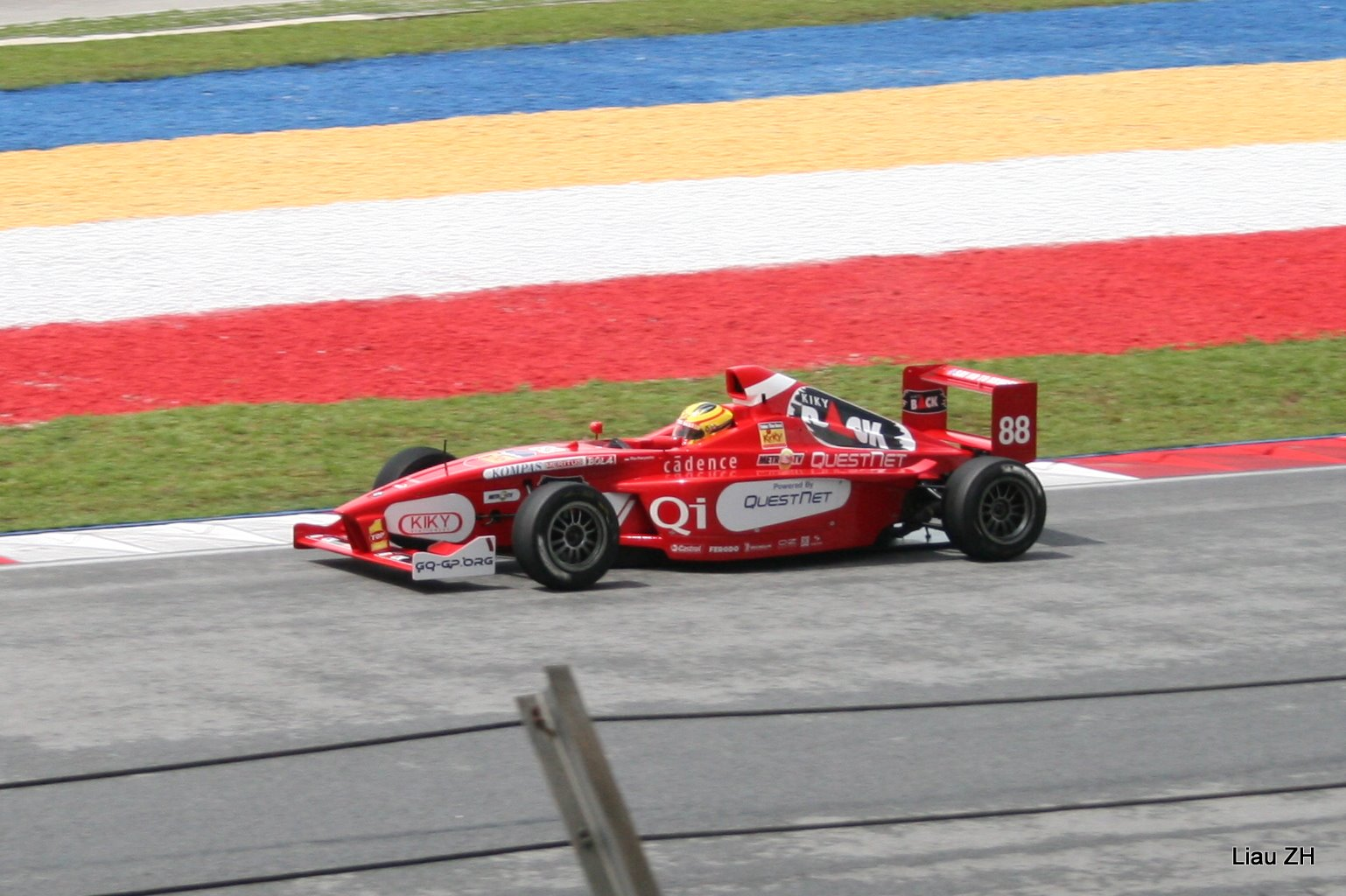
Haryanto competed in Formula BMW Pacific in 2009

Haryanto began his car racing career competing in three Asian-based series during 2008: the Asian Formula Renault Challenge, Formula Asia 2.0, and Formula BMW Pacific. He was most competitive in the FAsia 2.0 series, winning two races to finish third overall in the championship behind expatriate European drivers Felix Rosenqvist and Matthias Beche.

In 2009, Haryanto again competed in a variety of series, including the Australian Drivers' Championship and the Asian Formula Renault Challenge once more. His main focus this year, however, was the Formula BMW Pacific championship, which he dominated with 11 victories from the 15 races (although five of these races were won outright by invitational drivers who were not entered in the championship), driving for the Malaysian Meritus team. This included a perfect run of four outright victories, pole positions and fastest laps in the four consecutive races held at his home circuit of Sentul. He also competed in a round of the equivalent European FBMW series, himself a guest driver on this occasion.

=== GP3 Series ===
Haryanto stepped up to the more competitive European racing scene full-time for 2010 by joining the Manor Racing team for the Formula One-supporting GP3 Series. His three teammates during the season were James Jakes, Adrien Tambay and Adrian Quaife-Hobbs. In an impressive first season at this level, he won a race at Istanbul Park and took two further podium placings to finish fifth place in the drivers' championship, the leading Manor driver. His form was "one of the surprises of the season", according to the Autosport magazine. He remained with the team for 2011, now badged as Marussia Manor Racing, alongside Quaife-Hobbs and Matias Laine. Despite increasing his victory count to two, with wins at the Nürburgring and the Hungaroring, his inconsistency—including a run of seven races without scoring points at the start of the year—saw him slip to seventh place in the championship, behind Quaife-Hobbs. Both of his victories were in rainy conditions, giving him something of a reputation as a wet-weather specialist.

=== Auto GP ===
In addition to his GP3 duties, Haryanto also drove for the DAMS team in the Auto GP series, competing in all but one round of the championship as it clashed with the GP3 schedule. Driving alongside Sergey Afanasyev and part-timer Tambay, he took a win at the Circuit Ricardo Tormo in Valencia and finished seventh in the drivers' standings. The efforts of Haryanto, Afanasyev, Tambay, and Haryanto's substitute, Kevin Korjus, were enough for DAMS to win the teams' championship.

=== GP2 Series ===
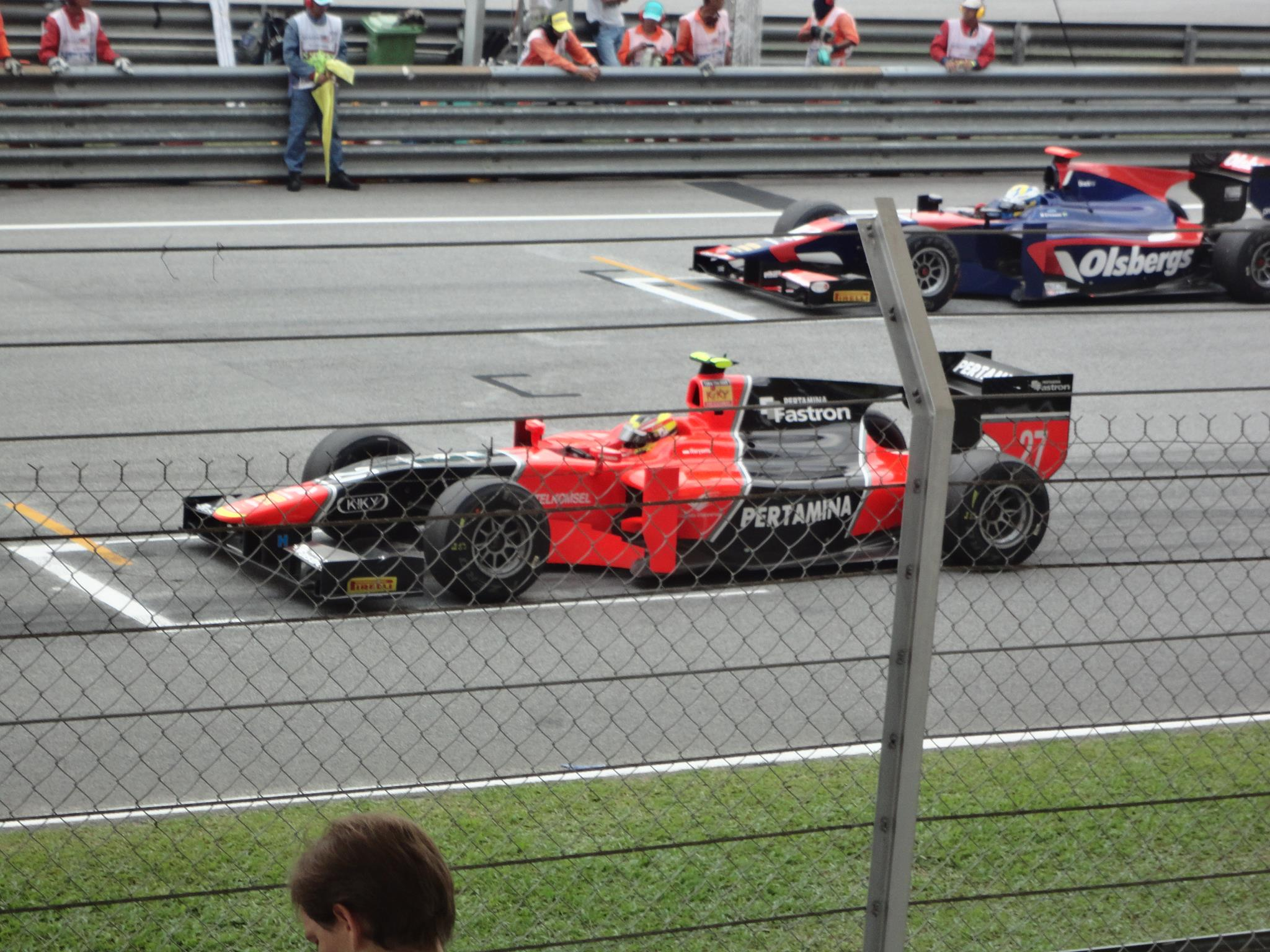
Haryanto lining up alongside Marcus Ericsson during his first GP2 Series event in 2012 Sepang GP2 Series round, driving for Carlin.

Haryanto made his GP2 Series début with DAMS at the non-championship season finale at Yas Marina in 2011. He was in the series full-time for 2012 with the Marussia-backed Carlin team, where he partnered Max Chilton. He was the first Indonesian to compete at this level of motorsport since Ananda Mikola competed in International Formula 3000 during 2000 and 2001. In his first season of GP2, Haryanto secured a single fastest lap, a single pole position—in wet conditions at Spa, confirming his reputation as a wet-weather specialist—and a best race finish of fifth in the feature race at Valencia, securing 14th place in the championship at season's end.

Haryanto raced in the 2013 GP2 Series for the Barwa Addax Team alongside teammate Jake Rosenzweig. On 30 June 2013, he gained his first podium in the GP2 Series at Silverstone and the same time, first podium for the Barwa Addax Team in the 2013 GP2 season.

For the 2014 GP2 Series, Haryanto moved to EQ8 Caterham Racing, partnering with Alexander Rossi. On 24 May 2014, he gained his second podium in the GP2 Series at Monaco and, at the same time, first podium in the 2014 GP2 season.

Haryanto switched to Campos for the 2015 GP2 Series season. After taking second place at the feature race in Bahrain, Haryanto took his first win in GP2 in the following day's sprint race. He achieved his second victory in the sprint race at the Red Bull Ring despite a damaged front wing. Haryanto finished the 2015 GP2 Series season in fourth place with 138 points.

== Formula One career ==
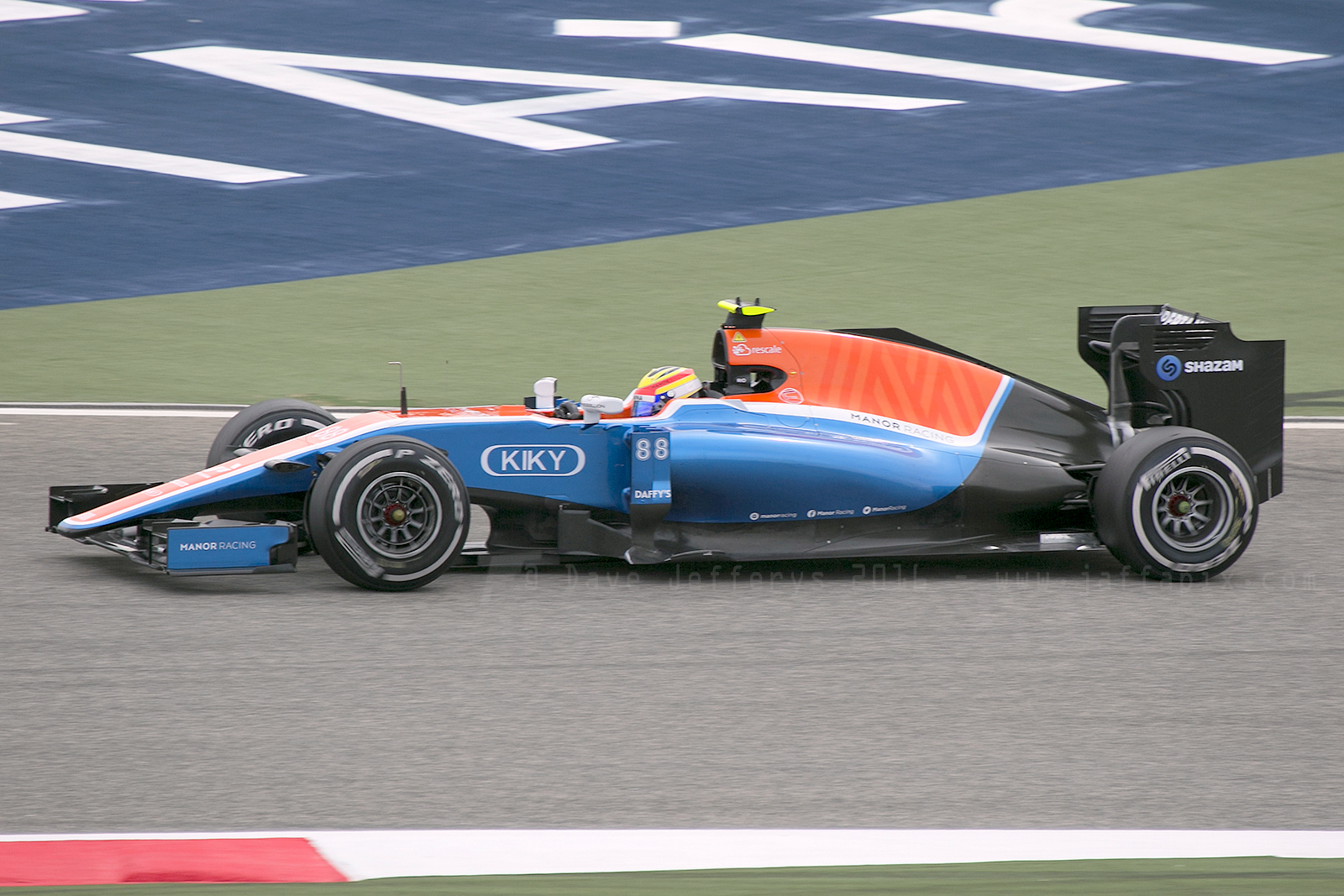
Haryanto participating in the 2016 Bahrain Grand Prix during free practice

Haryanto had been linked to the Virgin Racing/Marussia F1/Manor Racing team since his first GP3 season with Manor in 2010, as he had driven for junior teams with its backing since then. In the autumn of that year, he won the right to test with Virgin at the end of the 2010 season due to his finishing position as the highest ranked Manor driver in the GP3 final standings. He tested for Virgin in Abu Dhabi on 16 November. Suffering gearbox problems, he posted the slowest time of the thirteen runners in the morning session. He did not receive the prize test in 2011 because teammate Adrian Quaife-Hobbs beat him in the standings on this occasion.

Haryanto and 2012 GP2 Series teammate Max Chilton drove for Marussia in the first young driver tests of 2012, held in-season at Silverstone. Running over the course of two days, Haryanto completed three hundred kilometres of testing, satisfying one of the conditions to be eligible for a superlicence and becoming the first Indonesian driver to qualify for one.

=== Manor (2016) ===
On 18 February 2016, Haryanto was confirmed as a driver of Manor Racing for the 2016 Formula One season alongside 2015 DTM Champion Pascal Wehrlein. He made his debut at the 2016 Australian Grand Prix, however got off to a rocky start with an incident involving Romain Grosjean when they collided in the pit lane during practice. Haryanto was later issued a three-place grid penalty for the incident, as well as two penalty points added to his licence. Haryanto retired from his debut race due to a drive link problem on the 18th lap. Haryanto was the most-voted driver in Formula One's newly introduced Driver of the Day vote, before it was discovered that an Indonesian IP address had attempted to rig the results in his favour – Romain Grosjean was ultimately awarded the honour.

Haryanto was the second driver to be eliminated from qualifying for the 2016 Bahrain Grand Prix, ahead of Felipe Nasr. However, this meant a grid place of 20th due to Renault's Kevin Magnussen having to start from the pitlane after failing to stop for weighing during practice. He was the last car to finish the race, in 17th place and one lap down. He managed to beat the other Renault driver Jolyon Palmer to 21st in China, before he became tangled up in a first-lap crash in Russia that involved Nico Hülkenberg and Esteban Gutiérrez. Haryanto repeated his Bahrain performance in Spain, with his next race in Monaco bringing him a career-best 15th, albeit 4 laps down and once again the last classified finisher. He remained the last classified car in the next two races, with 19th and 18th places, before a 16th-place finish in Austria brought attention to the gap in talent between himself and teammate Wehrlein, who scored Manor's only point of the season in the same race. He spun off in the wet in Britain, whilst what would turn out to be his final two races again saw him the last classified finisher as his future became unclear due to a lack of sponsorship.

On 10 August 2016, Manor confirmed that they were demoting Haryanto to reserve driver due to a lack of sponsorship. This was because the promised funds from the Indonesian Ministry of Youth and Sport had been blocked by the Parliament, citing invalid procedures of funding procurements by Minister of Youth and Sport Imam Nahrawi. Esteban Ocon was announced as his replacement. When the parent company of the team collapsed at the end of the season, Haryanto was the only driver of the team not to make the 2017 grid, with Ocon and Wehrlein moving to Force India and Sauber respectively.

== Sports car racing ==
=== 2018 ===
Haryanto participated in the 2018 SIC888 Race at Shanghai International Circuit. He teamed up with fellow Indonesians, Anderson Tanoto and Audi R8 LMS Cup champion Andrew Haryanto (no relation), driving an Audi R8 LMS GT4. The trio finished the 6-hour race in 5th position.

=== 2019 ===
Haryanto competed in the 2019 Blancpain GT World Challenge Asia with T2 Motorsports, driving the No. 75 Ferrari 488 GT3 alongside Indonesian compatriot David Tjiptobiantoro in all but the third round, where Tjiptobiantoro was replaced by Singaporean driver Gregory Teo. He finished 31st overall and 12th in the Pro-Am Cup.

Haryanto also raced in the 2019-20 Asian Le Mans Series, again with T2 Motorsports, driving the No. 75 Ferrari 488 GT3 with Tjiptobiantoro and Italian driver Christian Colombo. He finished 9th in the driver's championship.

== Personal life ==
Haryanto was born in Solo to Sinyo Haryanto and Indah Pennywati, both Surakarta locals of Chinese-Indonesian descent. His three older brothers are Roy, Ricky and Rian. The three of them also had careers in national racing events with their father who was also active in racing until 2003.

In 2014, Haryanto earned a business degree from Anglia Ruskin University, studying at their Singaporean campus. At the beginning of 2017, he entered the business field as he was assigned by his father to oversee the security printing division at his family's printing company Kiky. During Haryanto's Formula One career, Kiky were involved in a lawsuit over copyright infringement with Spanish cartoonist Adaco as they were claimed to have used Adacos' works in their printing without permission. Haryanto is well known for owning Grandis Barn Restaurant in Surakarta, and Teakyard Restaurant in Colomadu, Central Java.

Haryanto and his family are devout Muslims. Whenever he races, he would adhere the Throne Verse on his car cockpit and read it as part of his race ritual. Haryanto's family owns a Pesantren (Islamic Boarding School).

Haryanto supported his hometown football club Persis Solo.

On 5 December 2024, Haryanto married Athina Papadimitriou, who is the niece of Sandiaga Uno.

== Racing record ==
=== Karting career summary ===
Season	Series	Position
2005	Open Belgian Championship — Cadet	33rd
2005	Grand Prix Karting FFSA — Junior	42nd
2006	Rotax Max Challenge Grand Finals — Junior	23rd
2006	Asian Karting Open Championship — Formula 125 Junior Open	**1st**
2006	Asian Karting Open Championship — ROK Junior	**1st**
2007	Rotax Max Challenge Asia — Junior	**2nd**
2008	Asian Karting Open Championship — Rotax Max Junior	5th
2008	Rotax Max Challenge Grand Finals — Junior	4th

=== Racing career summary ===
Season	Series	Team	Races	Wins	Poles	F/laps	Podiums	Points	Position
2008	Asian Formula Renault Challenge	Asia Racing Team	10	2	1	2	3	160	6th
2008	Formula Asia 2.0	Asia Racing Team	13	1	1	2	7	121	**3rd**
2008	Formula BMW Pacific	Pacific Racing	5	0	0	0	0	0†	NC†
2009	Australian Drivers' Championship – National A	PHR Scuderia	2	0	1	1	0	29	11th
2009	Australian Drivers' Championship – Gold Star	Astuti Motorsport	2	0	0	0	0	18	8th
2009	Asian Formula Renault Challenge	Asia Racing Team	2	0	0	0	2	48	11th
2009	Formula BMW Europe	Scuderia Coloni	2	0	0	0	0	0†	NC†
2009	Formula BMW Pacific	Questnet Team Qi-Meritus	15	11	7	9	12	250	**1st**
2010	GP3 Series	Manor Racing	16	1	0	0	3	27	5th
2010	British Formula 3 International Series	CF Racing Manor Motorsport	6	0	0	0	0	0	20th
2010	Masters of Formula 3	CF Racing Manor Motorsport	1	0	0	0	0	N/A	10th
2010	Macau Grand Prix	Räikkönen Robertson Racing	1	0	0	0	0	N/A	NC
2010	Formula One	Marussia Virgin Racing	Test driver						
2011	GP3 Series	Marussia Manor Racing	16	2	0	1	4	31	7th
2011	Auto GP	DAMS	14	1	1	2	3	82	7th
2011	GP2 Final	DAMS	2	0	0	0	0	0	17th
2012	GP2 Series	Carlin	24	0	1	1	0	38	14th
2012	Formula One	Marussia F1 Team	Test driver						
2013	GP2 Series	Barwa Addax Team	22	0	0	0	1	22	19th
2014	GP2 Series	EQ8 Caterham Racing	22	0	0	0	1	28	15th
2015	GP2 Series	Campos Racing	22	3	0	1	5	138	4th
2015	Formula One	Manor Marussia F1 Team	Test driver						
2016	Formula One	Pertamina Manor Racing MRT	12	0	0	0	0	0	24th
2016–17	Formula E	Formula E Racing	Test driver						
2018	Audi R8 LMS Cup - Invitational Race	Absolute Racing	1	0	0	0	0	N/A	5th
2019	Blancpain GT World Challenge Asia	T2 Motorsports	12	0	0	0	0	11	31st
2019	Blancpain GT World Challenge Asia - Pro-Am	T2 Motorsports	12	0	0	0	1	62	12th
2019–20	Asian Le Mans Series - GT	T2 Motorsports	4	0	1	0	0	41	9th

^{†} As Haryanto was a guest driver, he was ineligible for points.

=== Complete Formula Asia 2.0 results ===
(key) (Races in bold indicate pole position) (Races in italics indicate fastest lap)

Year	Entrant	1	2	3	4	5	6	7	8	9	10	11	12	13	14	15	Pos	Points
2008	Asia Racing Team	SEP1; 1; 8	SEP1; 2; 6	SEP1; 3; 10	SEP2; 1; 8	SEP2; 2; 7	BIR1; 1; 4	BIR1; 2; 2	BIR2; 1; 4	BIR2; 2; 2	SHI1; 1; 3	SHI1; 2; 1	SHI2; 1; 1	SHI2; 2; 2	SHI2; 3; 4	SHI2; 4; 3	3rd	121

=== Complete Asian Formula Renault Challenge results ===
(key) (Races in bold indicate pole position) (Races in italics indicate fastest lap)

Year	Entrant	1	2	3	4	5	6	7	8	9	10	11	12	13	14	Pos	Points
2008	Asia Racing Team	ZIC1; 1 Ret	ZIC1; 2; 4	SHI1; 1; 9	SHI1; 2; 9	SHI2; 1	SHI2; 2	SEP; 1; 3	SEP; 2; 4	ZIC2; 1	ZIC2; 2	**ZIC3**; **1**; 1	ZIC3; 2; 1	ZIC4; 1; 7	ZIC4; 2; 4	6th	160
2009	Asia Racing Team	ZIC1; 1	ZIC1; 2	SHI1; 1; 2	SHI1; 2; 2	BEI; 1	BEI; 2	SHI2; 1	SHI2; 2	CHE; 1	CHE; 2	ZIC2; 1	ZIC2; 2	ZIC3; 1	ZIC3; 2	11th	48

=== Complete Formula BMW Pacific results ===
(key) (Races in bold indicate pole position) (Races in italics indicate fastest lap)

Year	Entrant	1	2	3	4	5	6	7	8	9	10	11	12	13	14	15	Pos	Points
2009	Questnet Team Qi-Meritus	SEP1; 1; 3	SEP1; 2; 1	SEP2; 1 Ret	SEP2; 2; 3	SEP2; 3; 4	SEP2; 4; 1	**SEN**; **1**; 1	**SEN**; **2**; 1	**SEN**; **3**; 1	**SEN**; **4**; 1	**SGP**; **1**; 2	SGP; 1; 4	OKA; 1; 2	**OKA**; **1**; 2	**MAC**; 3	1st	250

=== Complete Eurocup Formula Renault 2.0 results ===
(key) (Races in bold indicate pole position; races in italics indicate fastest lap)

Year	Entrant	1	2	3	4	5	6	7	8	9	10	11	12	13	14	15	16	DC	Points
2010	Team Firstair	ALC; 1	ALC; 2	SPA; 1	SPA; 2	BRN; 1	BRN; 2	MAG; 1	MAG; 2	HUN; 1; 19	HUN; 2; 16	HOC; 1	HOC; 2	SIL; 1	SIL; 2	CAT; 1	CAT; 2	NC†	0

† As Haryanto was a guest driver, he was ineligible for points

=== Complete GP3 Series results ===
(key) (Races in bold indicate pole position) (Races in italics indicate fastest lap)

Year	Entrant	1	2	3	4	5	6	7	8	9	10	11	12	13	14	15	16	DC	Points
2010	Manor Racing	CAT; FEA; 20	CAT; SPR; 25	IST; FEA; 8	IST; SPR; 1	VAL; FEA; 6	VAL; SPR; 4	SIL; FEA; 2	SIL; SPR; Ret	HOC; FEA; Ret	HOC; SPR; Ret	HUN; FEA; 20	HUN; SPR; 11	SPA; FEA; 18	SPA; SPR; 18	MNZ; FEA; 3	MNZ; SPR; 23	5th	27
2011	Marussia Manor Racing	IST; FEA; 26	IST; SPR; 10	CAT; FEA; 20	CAT; SPR; 11	VAL; FEA; 19	VAL; SPR; 22†	SIL; FEA; 10	SIL; SPR; 4	NÜR; FEA; 1	NÜR; SPR; 10	HUN; FEA; 9	HUN; SPR; 1	SPA; FEA; 12	SPA; SPR; 9	MNZ; FEA; 3	MNZ; SPR; 2	7th	31

^{†} Driver did not finish the race, but was classified as he completed over 90% of the race distance.

=== Complete Auto GP results ===
(key) (Races in bold indicate pole position) (Races in italics indicate fastest lap)

Year	Entrant	1	2	3	4	5	6	7	8	9	10	11	12	13	14	Pos	Points
2011	DAMS	MNZ; 1 Ret	MNZ; 2; 11	HUN; 1; 10	HUN; 2; 5	**BRN**; **1**; 6	BRN; 2; 2	DON; 1; 11	DON; 2; 11	OSC; 1	OSC; 2	VAL; 1; 5	VAL; 2; 1	MUG; 1; 5	MUG; 2; 2	7th	82

=== Complete GP2 Series results ===
(key) (Races in bold indicate pole position) (Races in italics indicate fastest lap)

Year	Entrant	1	2	3	4	5	6	7	8	9	10	11	12	13	14	15	16	17	18	19	20	21	22	23	24	DC	Points
2012	Carlin	SEP; FEA; 12	SEP; SPR; 10	BHR1; FEA; 9	BHR1; SPR; 15	BHR2; FEA; 6	BHR2; SPR; 6	CAT; FEA; 16	CAT; SPR; 15	MON; FEA; 14	MON; SPR; 11	VAL; FEA; 5	VAL; SPR; Ret	SIL; FEA; 10	SIL; SPR; 12	HOC; FEA; 17	HOC; SPR; 11	HUN; FEA; 12	HUN; SPR; 7	**SPA**; **FEA**; 10	SPA; SPR; 7	MNZ; FEA; 19	MNZ; SPR; 12	MRN; FEA; 9	MRN; SPR; 11	14th	38
2013	Barwa Addax Team	SEP; FEA; 20	SEP; SPR; 18	BHR; FEA; 15	BHR; SPR; 24	CAT; FEA; 9	CAT; SPR; 24	MON; FEA; Ret	MON; SPR; 16	SIL; FEA; 7	SIL; SPR; 2	NÜR; FEA; 18	NÜR; SPR; 14	HUN; FEA; 11	HUN; SPR; 10	SPA; FEA; 19	SPA; SPR; 25	MNZ; FEA; 14	MNZ; SPR; 7	MRN; FEA; 20	MRN; SPR; 11	YMC; FEA; 14	YMC; SPR; 12			19th	22
2014	EQ8 Caterham Racing	BHR; FEA; 16	BHR; SPR; 16	CAT; FEA; 5	CAT; SPR; Ret	MON; FEA; 7	MON; SPR; 3	RBR; FEA; 11	RBR; SPR; 17	SIL; FEA; 21	SIL; SPR; Ret	HOC; FEA; 22†	HOC; SPR; 10	HUN; FEA; Ret	HUN; SPR; 17	SPA; FEA; Ret	SPA; SPR; 16	MNZ; FEA; 16	MNZ; SPR; 15	SOC; FEA; 18	SOC; SPR; 15	YMC; FEA; 9	YMC; SPR; 12			15th	28
2015	Campos Racing	BHR; FEA; 2	BHR; SPR; 1	CAT; FEA; 4	CAT; SPR; 6	MON; FEA; 16	MON; SPR; Ret	RBR; FEA; 7	RBR; SPR; 1	SIL; FEA; 8	SIL; SPR; 1	HUN; FEA; 4	HUN; SPR; 5	SPA; FEA; 13	SPA; SPR; 10	MNZ; FEA; 13	MNZ; SPR; 11	SOC; FEA; 5	SOC; SPR; 2	BHR; FEA; 7	BHR; SPR; 18	YMC; FEA; 7	YMC; SPR; C			4th	138

^{†} Driver did not finish the race, but was classified as he completed over 90% of the race distance.

==== Complete GP2 Final results ====
(key) (Races in bold indicate pole position) (Races in italics indicate fastest lap)

Year	Entrant	1	2	DC	Points
2011	DAMS	YMC; FEA; 12	YMC; SPR; 24	17th	0

=== Complete Formula One results ===
(key) (Races in bold indicate pole position; races in italics indicate fastest lap)

Year	Entrant	Chassis	Engine	1	2	3	4	5	6	7	8	9	10	11	12	13	14	15	16	17	18	19	20	21	WDC	Points
2016	Pertamina Manor Racing MRT	Manor MRT05	Mercedes PU106C Hybrid 1.6 V6 t	AUS; Ret	BHR; 17	CHN; 21	RUS; Ret	ESP; 17	MON; 15	CAN; 19	EUR; 18	AUT; 16	GBR; Ret	HUN; 21	GER; 20	BEL	ITA	SIN	MAL	JPN	USA	MEX	BRA	ABU	24th	0

=== Complete Blancpain GT World Challenge Asia results ===
(key) (Races in bold indicate pole position) (Races in italics indicate fastest lap)

Year	Entrant	1	2	3	4	5	6	7	8	9	10	11	12	Pos	Points	Ref
2019	T2 Motorsports	SEP; 1; 17	SEP; 2; 18	CHA; 1; 7	CHA; 2; 16	SUZ; 1; 18	SUZ; 2; 16	FUJ; 1; 10	FUJ; 2 Ret	KOR; 1 Ret	KOR; 2; 13	SHA; 1; 16	SHA; 2; 8	31st	11	

=== Asian Le Mans Series results ===
(key) (Races in bold indicate pole position) (Races in italics indicate fastest lap)

Year	Entrant	Class	Make	Engine	1	2	3	4	Pos	Points	Ref(s)
2019–20	T2 Motorsports	GT	Ferrari 488 GT3	Ferrari F154CB 3.9 L Turbo V8	SHA; 7	BEN; 4	SEP; 4	**CHA**; 5	9th	41	

Sporting positions
Preceded by Ross Jamison	Formula BMW Pacific; Champion; 2009	Succeeded by Richard Bradley
