= 2011 GP3 Series =

Season of motor racing competitions

The 2011 GP3 Series season was the second season of the GP3 Series, a feeder series for the GP2 Series. The season began at Istanbul Park on 7 May and concluded at Autodromo Nazionale Monza on 11 September after eight rounds made up of two races each and all in support of European Formula 1 Grands Prix. The 2010 champion Esteban Gutiérrez graduated to the GP2 Series so did not defend his title.

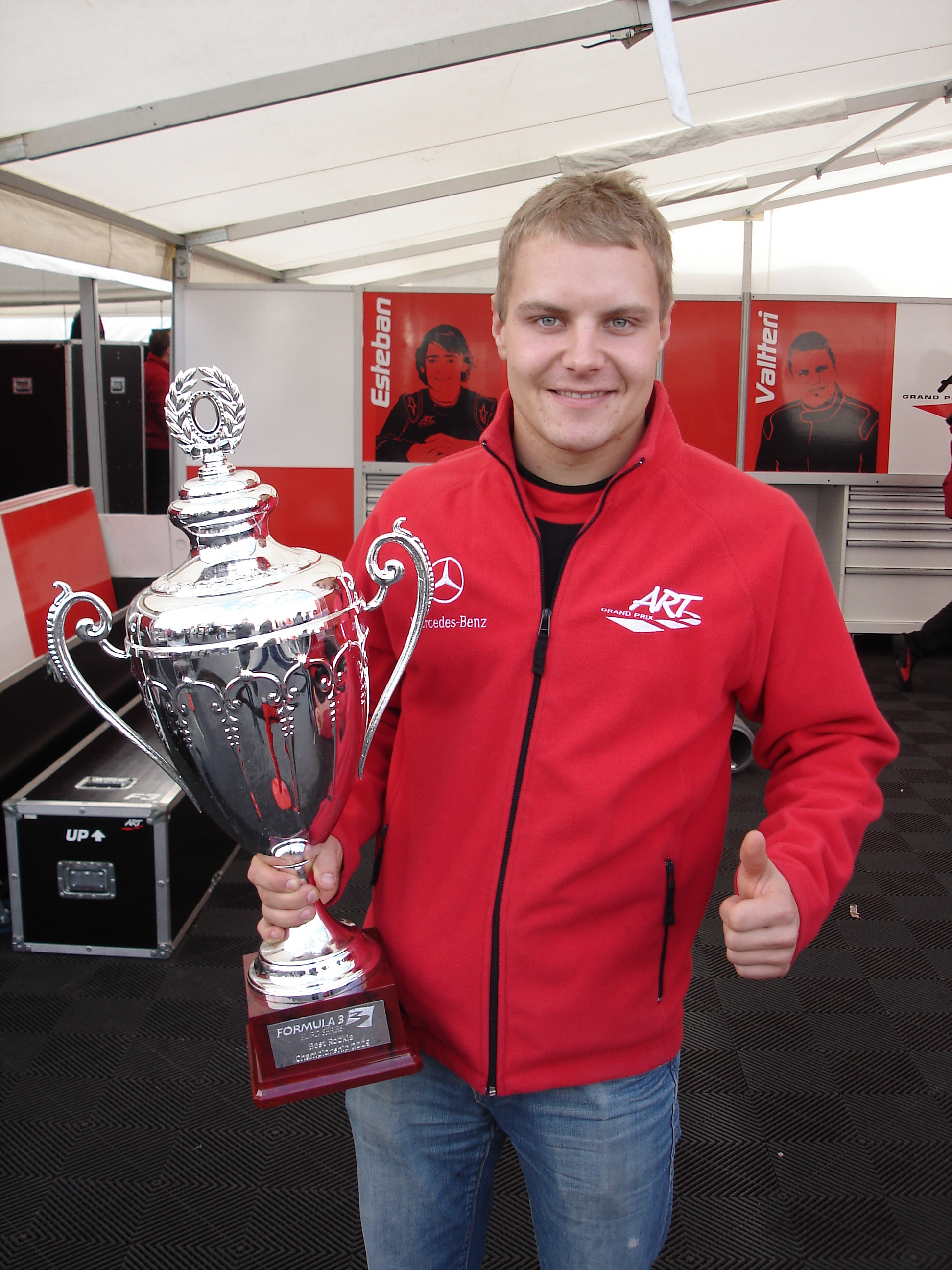
Valtteri Bottas (pictured in 2009), won the 2011 championship

After the early rounds, the likes of Mitch Evans, Nigel Melker, Andrea Caldarelli and Alexander Sims were fighting for the championship lead. However, Caldarelli had to retire from the series due to failing to raise a sufficient budget for the whole season. Sims then held the lead after consistent podium finishes in both Valencia and Silverstone. This was not to last though, as the Finn Valtteri Bottas started to find his speed at Nürburgring, taking the top spot after winning the first race at Hungaroring while Sims was disqualified due rear floor height check. Bottas led the championship with 7 points from Sims. Total of 6 drivers were within 13 points from Bottas at that time.

Bottas was able to secure the title in the first race of Monza. In that race he took the chequered flag and his closest rival and team-mate James Calado was left to second place. As 7 points is the maximum from Sunday's race and Bottas had more victories than Calado, the 7-point gap between them was enough for Bottas to clinch the title with one race still to go.

== Teams and drivers ==
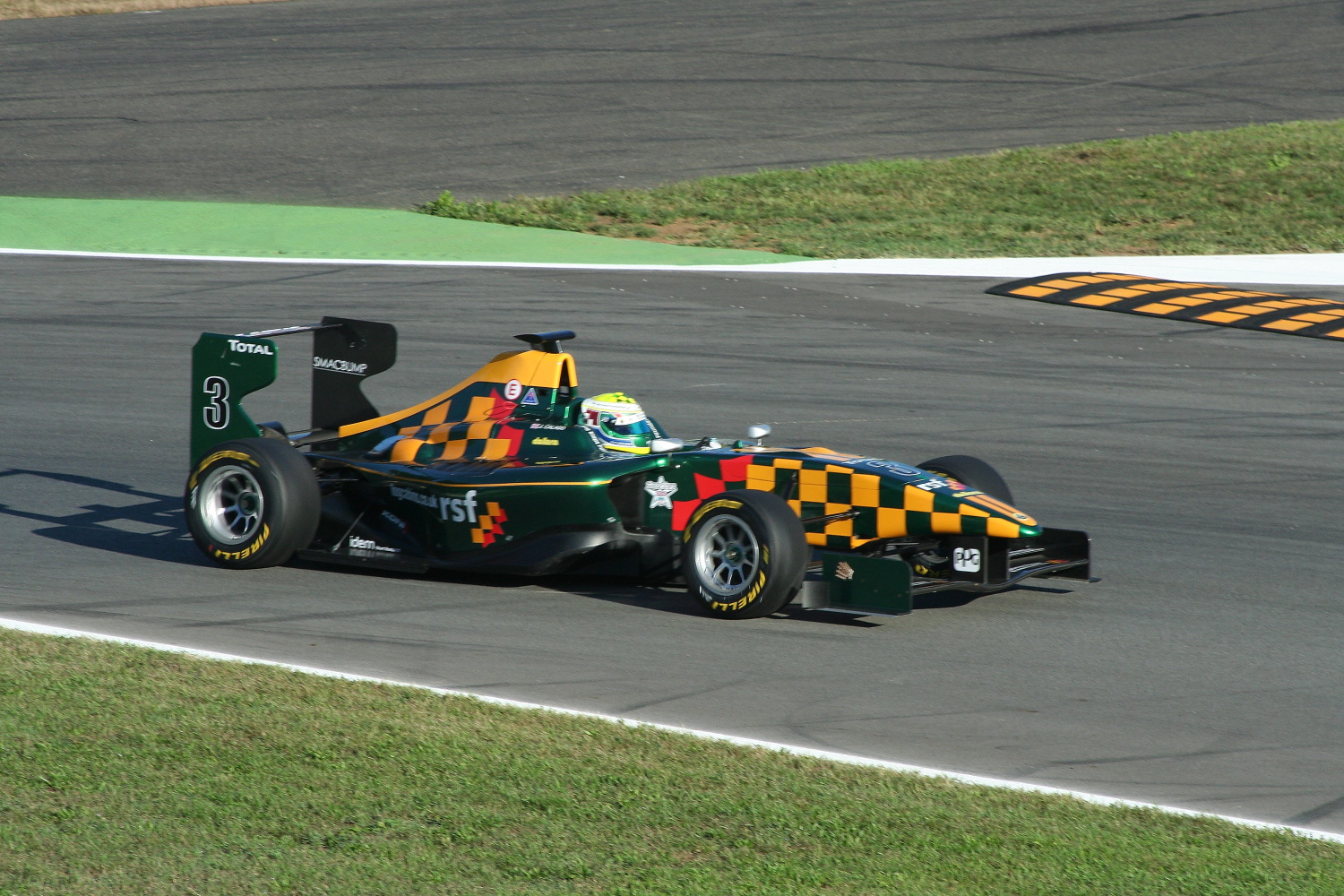
Championship runner-up James Calado

All of the teams used the Dallara GP3/10 chassis with and a Renault four-cylinder 2.0 litre (122 cu in) turbocharged engines order and with tyres supplied by Pirelli.

Team	No.	Driver	Rounds
(France) Lotus ART	1	(Brazil) Pedro Nunes	1–6
(France) Lotus ART	1	(New Zealand) Richie Stanaway	7–8
(France) Lotus ART	2	(Finland) Valtteri Bottas	All
(France) Lotus ART	3	(United Kingdom) James Calado	All
(Republic of Ireland) Status Grand Prix (Note: Status Grand Prix competed under a Ireland license.)	4	(United Kingdom) Alexander Sims	All
(Republic of Ireland) Status Grand Prix	5	(Portugal) António Félix da Costa	All
(Republic of Ireland) Status Grand Prix	6	(Russia) Ivan Lukashevich	All
(Switzerland) Jenzer Motorsport	7	(Switzerland) Nico Müller	All
(Switzerland) Jenzer Motorsport	8	(Russia) Maxim Zimin	All
(Switzerland) Jenzer Motorsport	9	(Italy) Vittorio Ghirelli	1–6
(Switzerland) Jenzer Motorsport	9	(Switzerland) Alex Fontana	7
(Switzerland) Jenzer Motorsport	9	(Switzerland) Christophe Hurni	8
(United Kingdom) Marussia Manor Racing	10	(United Kingdom) Adrian Quaife-Hobbs	All
(United Kingdom) Marussia Manor Racing	11	(Indonesia) Rio Haryanto	All
(United Kingdom) Marussia Manor Racing	12	(Finland) Matias Laine	All
(United Kingdom) Carlin	14	(United States) Conor Daly	All
(United Kingdom) Carlin	15	(France) Tom Dillmann	1
(United Kingdom) Carlin	15	(Canada) Daniel Morad	2–4
(United Kingdom) Carlin	15	(United Kingdom) Callum MacLeod	5–8
(United Kingdom) Carlin	16	(Brazil) Leonardo Cordeiro	All
(France) Tech 1 Racing	17	(Finland) Aaro Vainio	All
(France) Tech 1 Racing	18	(Italy) Andrea Caldarelli	1–2
(France) Tech 1 Racing	18	(Netherlands) Thomas Hylkema	3–8
(France) Tech 1 Racing	19	(Hungary) Tamás Pál Kiss	All
(United Kingdom) Atech CRS GP	20	(Philippines) Marlon Stöckinger	All
(United Kingdom) Atech CRS GP	21	(United Kingdom) Nick Yelloly	All
(United Kingdom) Atech CRS GP	22	(Switzerland) Zoël Amberg	All
(Spain) Addax Team	23	(New Zealand) Dominic Storey	1–2
(Spain) Addax Team	23	(France) Tom Dillmann	3–8
(Spain) Addax Team	24	(Colombia) Gabriel Chaves	All
(Spain) Addax Team	25	(United Kingdom) Dean Smith	1–7
(Spain) Addax Team	25	(Italy) Vittorio Ghirelli	8
(Australia) MW Arden (Note: Arden International competed under a Australia license.)	26	(New Zealand) Mitch Evans	All
(Australia) MW Arden	27	(Switzerland) Simon Trummer	All
(Australia) MW Arden	28	(United Kingdom) Lewis Williamson	All
(Germany) RSC Mücke Motorsport	29	(United Kingdom) Luciano Bacheta	1–6
(Germany) RSC Mücke Motorsport	29	(Italy) Daniel Mancinelli	7–8
(Germany) RSC Mücke Motorsport	30	(Denmark) Michael Christensen	All
(Germany) RSC Mücke Motorsport	31	(Netherlands) Nigel Melker	All

=== Driver changes ===
Changed teams

- Michael Christensen moved from MW Arden to RSC Mücke Motorsport. Team-mate Leonardo Cordeiro also changed teams, moving to Carlin.
- After racing with Carlin in two meetings in 2010, António Félix da Costa moved into the series full-time with Status Grand Prix after claiming top rookie honours in the Formula 3 Euro Series. Another Carlin driver, Dean Smith, moved to the Addax Team.
- Vittorio Ghirelli switched from Atech CRS GP to Jenzer Motorsport.
- After missing the opening round, Daniel Morad joined Carlin from Status Grand Prix.
- Simon Trummer, who finished 25th in 2010 with Jenzer Motorsport, moved to MW Arden.

Entering/Re-Entering GP3 Series

- Formula Renault MEC champion Zoël Amberg joined the series with Atech CRS GP.
- Luciano Bacheta, the Formula Renault Eurocup runner-up, joined the series with RSC Mücke Motorsport.
- Valtteri Bottas joined the championship, having finished third in the Formula 3 Euro Series. He will continue with the Lotus ART team that he drove for in the Euro Series.
- James Calado joined the championship, having finished runner-up to Jean-Éric Vergne in British Formula 3 with Carlin. He will join Bottas at Lotus ART.
- Andrea Caldarelli, who finished third in Italian Formula Three, moved into the championship with Tech 1 Racing. Aaro Vainio joined him, having driven for the French squad in the Formula Renault Eurocup, finishing fourth in the standings.
- Gabriel Chaves stepped up from Italian Formula Three to GP3 with the Addax Team. He was joined by Dominic Storey, who moved over from a one-off drive in the Formula Renault 3.5 Series.
- Star Mazda champion Conor Daly joined the series for Carlin. He was joined by German Formula Three champion Tom Dillmann for the first round of the series in Istanbul Park.
- Having competed in Australian Formula Three and the Toyota Racing Series since the start of 2010, Mitch Evans joined MW Arden.
- Matias Laine made his debut in the series with Manor Racing, having competed in the Formula 3 Euro Series for Motopark Academy in 2010.
- Formula Renault UK race-winners Tamás Pál Kiss, Marlon Stöckinger, Lewis Williamson and Nick Yelloly all joined the series. Pál Kiss drove for Tech 1 Racing, Williamson drove for MW Arden while Stöckinger and Yelloly drove for Atech CRS GP.
- Alexander Sims made his debut in the series with Status Grand Prix, having finished fourth in the Formula 3 Euro Series for ART Grand Prix.
- Maxim Zimin joined the series with Jenzer Motorsport, having competed with the team in Formula Abarth.

Leaving GP3 Series

- Mirko Bortolotti, who finished eleventh for Barwa Addax, and Tobias Hegewald, who finished 22nd with RSC Mücke Motorsport, both returned to Formula Two for 2011. They were joined by Miki Monrás, who was tenth for MW Arden.
- Stefano Coletti and Pål Varhaug joined the GP2 Series with Trident Racing and DAMS respectively. 2010 champion Esteban Gutiérrez also joined GP2 with Lotus ART as well as being reserve driver for Formula One team Sauber.
- James Jakes, after initially signing to race in GP2 with Scuderia Coloni, raced in the IndyCar Series with Dale Coyne Racing.
- Josef Newgarden returned to his native United States to compete in Indy Lights for Sam Schmidt Motorsports.
- Alexander Rossi and Robert Wickens moved into the Formula Renault 3.5 Series. Rossi, who finished fourth in 2010 with ART Grand Prix, drove for Fortec Motorsport while championship runner-up Wickens drove for Carlin.

== 2011 Schedule ==
The 2011 calendar was announced on 18 January 2011. The series consisted of eight rounds. A prospective ninth round in Monaco was dropped on 2 February 2011 due to a lack of paddock space. It supported every other European Formula One event.

Round		Location	Circuit	Date	Supporting
1	R1	Istanbul, Turkey	Istanbul Racing Circuit	7 May	Turkish Grand Prix
1	R2	Istanbul, Turkey	Istanbul Racing Circuit	8 May	Turkish Grand Prix
2	R1	Catalunya, Spain	Circuit de Catalunya	21 May	Spanish Grand Prix
2	R2	Catalunya, Spain	Circuit de Catalunya	22 May	Spanish Grand Prix
3	R1	Valencia. Spain	Valencia Street Circuit	25 June	European Grand Prix
3	R2	Valencia. Spain	Valencia Street Circuit	26 June	European Grand Prix
4	R1	(United Kingdom) Silverstone, UK	Silverstone Circuit	9 July	British Grand Prix
4	R2	(United Kingdom) Silverstone, UK	Silverstone Circuit	10 July	British Grand Prix
5	R1	Nürburg, Germany	Nürburgring	23 July	German Grand Prix
5	R2	Nürburg, Germany	Nürburgring	24 July	German Grand Prix
6	R1	Budapest, Hungary	Hungaroring	30 July	Hungarian Grand Prix
6	R2	Budapest, Hungary	Hungaroring	31 July	Hungarian Grand Prix
7	R1	Spa, Belgium	Circuit de Spa-Francorchamps	27 August	Belgian Grand Prix
7	R2	Spa, Belgium	Circuit de Spa-Francorchamps	28 August	Belgian Grand Prix
8	R1	Monza, Italy	Autodromo Nazionale Monza	10 September	Italian Grand Prix
8	R2	Monza, Italy	Autodromo Nazionale Monza	11 September	Italian Grand Prix

The following rounds were included on the provisional calendars published by the FIA but were cancelled:

Round	Location	Circuit	Date	Supporting
R1	Monte Carlo, Monaco	Circuit de Monaco	27 May	Monaco Grand Prix
R2	Monte Carlo, Monaco	Circuit de Monaco	28 May	Monaco Grand Prix

== Results ==
Round		Circuit	Pole position	Fastest lap	Winning driver	Winning team	Report
1	R1	(Turkey) Istanbul Park	(France) Tom Dillmann	(Italy) Andrea Caldarelli	(Netherlands) Nigel Melker	(Germany) RSC Mücke Motorsport	Report
1	R2	(Turkey) Istanbul Park		(United Kingdom) Alexander Sims	(United Kingdom) Alexander Sims	(Republic of Ireland) Status Grand Prix	Report
2	R1	(Spain) Circuit de Catalunya	(New Zealand) Mitch Evans	(Finland) Valtteri Bottas	(New Zealand) Mitch Evans	(Australia) MW Arden	Report
2	R2	(Spain) Circuit de Catalunya		(Italy) Andrea Caldarelli	(Hungary) Tamás Pál Kiss	(France) Tech 1 Racing	Report
3	R1	(Spain) Valencia Street Circuit	(United Kingdom) Lewis Williamson	(United Kingdom) Adrian Quaife-Hobbs	(United Kingdom) Adrian Quaife-Hobbs	(United Kingdom) Marussia Manor Racing	Report
3	R2	(Spain) Valencia Street Circuit		(United Kingdom) James Calado	(United Kingdom) James Calado	(France) Lotus ART	Report
4	R1	(United Kingdom) Silverstone Circuit	(United Kingdom) Adrian Quaife-Hobbs	(United Kingdom) Alexander Sims	(Switzerland) Nico Müller	(Switzerland) Jenzer Motorsport	Report
4	R2	(United Kingdom) Silverstone Circuit		(United Kingdom) Adrian Quaife-Hobbs (Note: Adrian Quaife-Hobbs set the fastest lap, but did not finish in the top 10, so was ineligible to be the point-scorer for the fastest lap. Dean Smith was the point-scorer instead for setting the fastest lap of those finishing in the top 10.)	(United Kingdom) Lewis Williamson	(Australia) MW Arden	Report
5	R1	(Germany) Nürburgring	(New Zealand) Mitch Evans	(United Kingdom) Lewis Williamson	(Indonesia) Rio Haryanto	(United Kingdom) Marussia Manor Racing	Report
5	R2	(Germany) Nürburgring		(Netherlands) Nigel Melker	(Finland) Valtteri Bottas	(France) Lotus ART	Report
6	R1	(Hungary) Hungaroring	(Finland) Valtteri Bottas	(Denmark) Michael Christensen	(Finland) Valtteri Bottas	(France) Lotus ART	Report
6	R2	(Hungary) Hungaroring		(Netherlands) Nigel Melker	(Indonesia) Rio Haryanto	(United Kingdom) Marussia Manor Racing	Report
7	R1	(Belgium) Circuit de Spa-Francorchamps	(United Kingdom) James Calado	(Finland) Valtteri Bottas	(Finland) Valtteri Bottas	(France) Lotus ART	Report
7	R2	(Belgium) Circuit de Spa-Francorchamps		(United Kingdom) James Calado	(New Zealand) Richie Stanaway	(France) Lotus ART	Report
8	R1	(Italy) Autodromo Nazionale Monza	(United Kingdom) Adrian Quaife-Hobbs	(Indonesia) Rio Haryanto	(Finland) Valtteri Bottas	(France) Lotus ART	Report
8	R2	(Italy) Autodromo Nazionale Monza		(Finland) Valtteri Bottas (Note: Valtteri Bottas set the fastest lap, but did not finish in the top 10, so was ineligible to be the point-scorer for the fastest lap. Callum MacLeod was the point-scorer instead for setting the fastest lap of those finishing in the top 10.)	(Portugal) António Félix da Costa	(Republic of Ireland) Status Grand Prix	Report

== Championship standings ==
=== Drivers' Championship ===
Pos	Driver	IST (Turkey)		CAT (Spain)		VAL (Spain)		SIL (United Kingdom)		NÜR (Germany)		HUN (Hungary)		SPA (Belgium)		MNZ (Italy)		Points
1	(Finland) Valtteri Bottas	4	8	10	7	7	3	15	12	3	1	**1**	2	1	19	1	17	62
2	(United Kingdom) James Calado	17	13	2	21	8	1	6	5	4	6	25	3	**2**	2	2	14	55
3	(Netherlands) Nigel Melker	1	3	6	2	Ret	19	Ret	8	10	3	8	4	3	Ret	9	Ret	38
4	(Switzerland) Nico Müller	11	15	5	Ret	Ret	14	1	11	15	7	4	5	7	3	4	3	36
5	(United Kingdom) Adrian Quaife-Hobbs	24	16	11	23	1	8	**4**	15	5	Ret	3	10	4	Ret	**Ret**	6	36
6	(United Kingdom) Alexander Sims	8	1	Ret	Ret	6	2	2	3	12	2	DSQ	9	Ret	Ret	21†	Ret	34
7	(Indonesia) Rio Haryanto	26	10	20	11	19	22†	10	4	1	10	9	1	12	9	3	2	31
8	(United Kingdom) Lewis Williamson	Ret	20	14	9	**2**	6	7	1	2	14	6	Ret	9	DNS	18	10	31
9	(New Zealand) Mitch Evans	6	7	**1**	5	3	4	9	Ret	**19**	22	Ret	24†	11	Ret	8	Ret	29
10	(Italy) Andrea Caldarelli	2	5	4	4													20
11	(Denmark) Michael Christensen	7	2	18	12	Ret	Ret	Ret	13	26†	12	2	13	15	4	12	11	19
12	(United Kingdom) Dean Smith	9	6	7	3	5	11	8	2	24	Ret	24	19	20	20			18
13	(Portugal) António Félix da Costa	5	4	12	17	Ret	20†	19	9	28	Ret	11	6	Ret	11	7	1	16
14	(France) Tom Dillmann	**3**	9			20	Ret	Ret	25†	22	5	7	22	6	Ret	Ret	9	15
15	(Finland) Aaro Vainio	15	Ret	3	20	Ret	Ret	11	18	7	13	5	7	13	Ret	22†	8	12
16	(Hungary) Tamás Pál Kiss	16	18	8	1	16	13	Ret	20	8	4	10	20	17	14	Ret	12	11
17	(United States) Conor Daly	21	25	21	22	12	7	13	7	6	8	13	11	5	7	6	Ret	10
18	(Switzerland) Simon Trummer	19	21	27	25†	Ret	Ret	12	10	9	16	16	12	19	5	5	4	9
19	(Colombia) Gabriel Chaves	10	12	13	6	4	5	Ret	14	27†	17	23	Ret	16	16	17	7	8
20	(New Zealand) Richie Stanaway													8	1	10	19	7
21	(United Kingdom) Nick Yelloly	13	11	25	18	9	12	3	6	16	9	21	Ret	Ret	13	Ret	Ret	7
22	(United Kingdom) Luciano Bacheta	Ret	19	22	16	18	10	5	19	25	25	17	Ret					4
23	(United Kingdom) Callum MacLeod									29	21	26	18	Ret	Ret	11	5	3
24	(Switzerland) Alex Fontana													14	6			1
25	(Italy) Vittorio Ghirelli	25	Ret	9	8	13	9	14	22	13	11	22	Ret			Ret	18	0
26	(Russia) Ivan Lukashevich	14	24	17	13	Ret	Ret	18	24	11	18	28	23	10	8	Ret	Ret	0
27	(Russia) Maxim Zimin	23	17	Ret	19	Ret	21†	DSQ	EX	20	15	19	8	Ret	15	Ret	16	0
28	(Switzerland) Zoël Amberg	12	14	16	10	11	18	Ret	16	21	20	15	16	Ret	12	Ret	Ret	0
29	(Philippines) Marlon Stöckinger	Ret	23	26	Ret	14	16	16	Ret	Ret	DNS	12	17	Ret	10	19	13	0
30	(Brazil) Leonardo Cordeiro	Ret	22	23	15	10	17	17	23	17	19	20	15	21	18	13	Ret	0
31	(Finland) Matias Laine	18	Ret	19	24	17	Ret	Ret	Ret	14	23	14	21	18	Ret	20	Ret	0
32	(Brazil) Pedro Nunes	22	26†	15	26†	Ret	15	Ret	17	23	Ret	18	14					0
33	(Canada) Daniel Morad			24	14	15	Ret	DNS	DNS									0
34	(Netherlands) Thomas Hylkema					Ret	Ret	20	21	18	24†	27	Ret	22	21	14	Ret	0
35	(Italy) Daniel Mancinelli													Ret	17	15	15	0
36	(Switzerland) Christophe Hurni															16	20	0
37	(New Zealand) Dominic Storey	20	Ret	Ret	27†													0
Pos	Driver	IST (Turkey)		CAT (Spain)		VAL (Spain)		SIL (United Kingdom)		NÜR (Germany)		HUN (Hungary)		SPA (Belgium)		MNZ (Italy)		Points

Key
Colour	Result
Gold	Winner
Silver	2nd place
Bronze	3rd place
Green	Other points position
Blue	Other classified position
Blue	Not classified, finished (NC)
Purple	Not classified, retired (Ret)
Red	Did not qualify (DNQ)
Red	Did not pre-qualify (DNPQ)
Black	Disqualified (DSQ)
White	Did not start (DNS)
White	Race cancelled (C)
Blank	Did not practice (DNP)
Blank	Excluded (EX)
Blank	Did not arrive (DNA)
Blank	Withdrawn (WD)
Text formatting	Meaning
**Bold**	Pole position point(s)
Italics	Fastest lap point(s)

=== Teams' Championship ===
Pos	Team	Car No.	IST (Turkey)		CAT (Spain)		VAL (Spain)		SIL (United Kingdom)		NÜR (Germany)		HUN (Hungary)		SPA (Belgium)		MNZ (Italy)		Points
1	(France) Lotus ART	1	22	26†	15	26†	Ret	15	Ret	17	23	Ret	18	14	8	1	10	19	124
1	(France) Lotus ART	2	4	8	10	7	7	3	15	12	3	1	**1**	2	1	19	1	17	124
1	(France) Lotus ART	3	17	13	2	21	8	1	6	5	4	6	25	3	**2**	2	2	14	124
2	(Australia) MW Arden	26	6	7	**1**	5	3	4	9	Ret	**19**	22	Ret	24†	11	Ret	8	Ret	69
2	(Australia) MW Arden	27	19	21	27	25†	Ret	Ret	12	10	9	16	16	12	19	5	5	4	69
2	(Australia) MW Arden	28	Ret	20	14	9	**2**	6	7	1	2	14	6	Ret	9	DNS	18	10	69
3	(United Kingdom) Marussia Manor Racing	10	24	16	11	23	1	8	**4**	15	5	Ret	3	10	4	Ret	**Ret**	6	67
3	(United Kingdom) Marussia Manor Racing	11	26†	10	20	11	19	22†	10	4	1	10	9	1	12	9	3	2	67
3	(United Kingdom) Marussia Manor Racing	12	18	Ret	19	24	17	Ret	Ret	Ret	14	23	14	21	18	Ret	20	Ret	67
4	(Germany) RSC Mücke Motorsport	29	Ret	19	22	16	18	10	5	19	25	25	17	Ret	Ret	17	15	15	61
4	(Germany) RSC Mücke Motorsport	30	7	2	18	12	Ret	Ret	Ret	13	26†	12	2	13	15	4	12	11	61
4	(Germany) RSC Mücke Motorsport	31	1	3	6	2	Ret	19	Ret	8	10	3	8	4	3	Ret	9	Ret	61
5	(Republic of Ireland) Status Grand Prix	4	8	1	Ret	Ret	6	2	2	3	12	2	DSQ	9	Ret	Ret	21†	Ret	50
5	(Republic of Ireland) Status Grand Prix	5	5	4	12	17	Ret	20†	19	9	28	Ret	11	6	Ret	11	7	1	50
5	(Republic of Ireland) Status Grand Prix	6	14	24	17	13	Ret	Ret	18	24	11	18	28	23	10	8	Ret	Ret	50
6	(France) Tech 1 Racing	17	15	Ret	3	20	Ret	Ret	11	18	7	13	5	7	13	Ret	22†	8	43
6	(France) Tech 1 Racing	18	2	5	4	4	Ret	Ret	20	21	18	24†	27	Ret	22	21	14	Ret	43
6	(France) Tech 1 Racing	19	16	18	8	1	16	13	Ret	20	8	4	10	20	17	14	Ret	12	43
7	(Switzerland) Jenzer Motorsport	7	11	15	5	Ret	Ret	14	1	11	15	7	4	5	7	3	4	3	37
7	(Switzerland) Jenzer Motorsport	8	23	17	Ret	19	Ret	21†	DSQ	EX	20	15	19	8	Ret	15	Ret	16	37
7	(Switzerland) Jenzer Motorsport	9	25	Ret	9	8	13	9	14	22	13	11	22	Ret	14	6	16	20	37
8	(Spain) Addax Team	23	20	Ret	Ret	27†	20	Ret	Ret	25†	22	5	7	22	6	Ret	Ret	9	33
8	(Spain) Addax Team	24	10	12	13	6	4	5	Ret	14	27†	17	23	Ret	16	16	17	7	33
8	(Spain) Addax Team	25	9	6	7	3	5	11	8	2	24	Ret	24	19	20	20	Ret	18	33
9	(United Kingdom) Carlin	14	21	25	21	22	12	7	13	7	6	8	13	11	5	7	6	Ret	21
9	(United Kingdom) Carlin	15	**3**	9	24	14	15	Ret	DNS	DNS	29	21	26	18	Ret	Ret	11	5	21
9	(United Kingdom) Carlin	16	Ret	22	23	15	10	17	17	23	17	19	20	15	21	18	13	Ret	21
10	(United Kingdom) Atech CRS GP	20	Ret	23	26	Ret	14	16	16	Ret	Ret	DNS	12	17	Ret	10	19	13	7
10	(United Kingdom) Atech CRS GP	21	13	11	25	18	9	12	3	6	16	9	21	Ret	Ret	13	Ret	Ret	7
10	(United Kingdom) Atech CRS GP	22	12	14	16	10	11	18	Ret	16	21	20	15	16	Ret	12	Ret	Ret	7
Pos	Team	Car No.	IST (Turkey)		CAT (Spain)		VAL (Spain)		SIL (United Kingdom)		NÜR (Germany)		HUN (Hungary)		SPA (Belgium)		MNZ (Italy)		Points

Key
Colour	Result
Gold	Winner
Silver	2nd place
Bronze	3rd place
Green	Other points position
Blue	Other classified position
Blue	Not classified, finished (NC)
Purple	Not classified, retired (Ret)
Red	Did not qualify (DNQ)
Red	Did not pre-qualify (DNPQ)
Black	Disqualified (DSQ)
White	Did not start (DNS)
White	Race cancelled (C)
Blank	Did not practice (DNP)
Blank	Excluded (EX)
Blank	Did not arrive (DNA)
Blank	Withdrawn (WD)
Text formatting	Meaning
**Bold**	Pole position point(s)
Italics	Fastest lap point(s)

- Drivers who did not finish the race but were classified are marked with †.
