= T Cars =

British motor racing series

- Category: Saloon car
- Country: United Kingdom
- Inaugural season: 1999
- Folded: 2007
- Constructors: Ford
- Last Drivers' champion: (United Kingdom) Daniel Brown

T Cars was a saloon car-based motor racing series based in the United Kingdom, open exclusively to drivers between the ages of 14 and 17. The series was set up in 1999 and was the first championship in the UK to allow drivers under the age of 16 to drive racing cars. The series was dropped in 2008, due to poor grid entries, and was finally replaced by the new Fiesta Junior Championship for the 2010 season.

== Champions ==
Season	Champion
1999	(United Kingdom) Tom Boardman
2000	(United Kingdom) Tom Kimber-Smith
2000	(United Kingdom) Stuart Hall
2001	(United Kingdom) Ben Reeves
2002	(United Kingdom) Matthew Wilson
2003	(United Kingdom) Simon Walker-Hansell
2004	(United Kingdom) Will Bratt
2005	(United Kingdom) Adrian Quaife-Hobbs
2006	(United Kingdom) Luciano Bacheta
2007	(United Kingdom) Daniel Brown
