= Maxim Zimin =

Russian racing driver

- Nationality: Russian
- Born: Maxim Igorevich Zimin; 28 April 1994 (age 32) Barnaul, Altai Krai, Russia

GP3 Series
- Years active: 2011
- Teams: Jenzer Motorsport
- Starts: 16
- Wins: 0
- Poles: 0
- Fastest laps: 0
- Best finish: 27th in 2011

Previous series
- 2009 2010: Formula Renault 2.0 Italy; Formula Abarth

Maxim Igorevich Zimin (born 28 April 1994 in Barnaul) is a Russian former racing driver. He has previously competed in the GP3 Series.

== Racing record ==
=== Career summary ===
Season	Series	Team	Races	Wins	Poles	F/Laps	Podiums	Points	Position
2009	Formula Renault 2.0 Italia	Jenzer Motorsport	2	0	0	0	0	14	27th
2009	Eurocup Formula Renault 2.0	Jenzer Motorsport	2	0	0	0	0	0	NC†
2010	Formula Abarth	Jenzer Motorsport	14	0	1	3	4	80	5th
2010	Formula Renault 2.0 MEC	Jenzer Motorsport	10	0	0	1	2	131	5th
2011	GP3 Series	Jenzer Motorsport	15	0	0	0	0	0	27th

† As he was a guest driver, Zimin was ineligible to score points.

=== Complete Eurocup Formula Renault 2.0 results ===
(key) (Races in bold indicate pole position; races in italics indicate fastest lap)

Year	Entrant	1	2	3	4	5	6	7	8	9	10	11	12	13	14	DC	Points
2009	Jenzer Motorsport	CAT; 1	CAT; 2	SPA; 1	SPA; 2	HUN; 1	HUN; 2	SIL; 1	SIL; 2	LMS; 1	LMS; 2	NÜR; 1	NÜR; 2	ALC; 1; 23	ALC; 2; 21	NC†	0

† As Zimin was a guest driver, he was ineligible for points

=== Complete GP3 Series results ===
(key) (Races in bold indicate pole position) (Races in italics indicate fastest lap)

Year	Entrant	1	2	3	4	5	6	7	8	9	10	11	12	13	14	15	16	DC	Points
2011	Jenzer Motorsport	IST; FEA; 23	IST; SPR; 17	CAT; FEA; Ret	CAT; SPR; 19	VAL; FEA; Ret	VAL; SPR; 21†	SIL; FEA; DSQ	SIL; SPR; EX	NÜR; FEA; 20	NÜR; SPR; 15	HUN; FEA; 19	HUN; SPR; 8	SPA; FEA; Ret	SPA; SPR; 15	MNZ; FEA; Ret	MNZ; SPR; 16	27th	0
