= Thomas Hylkema =

Dutch racing driver

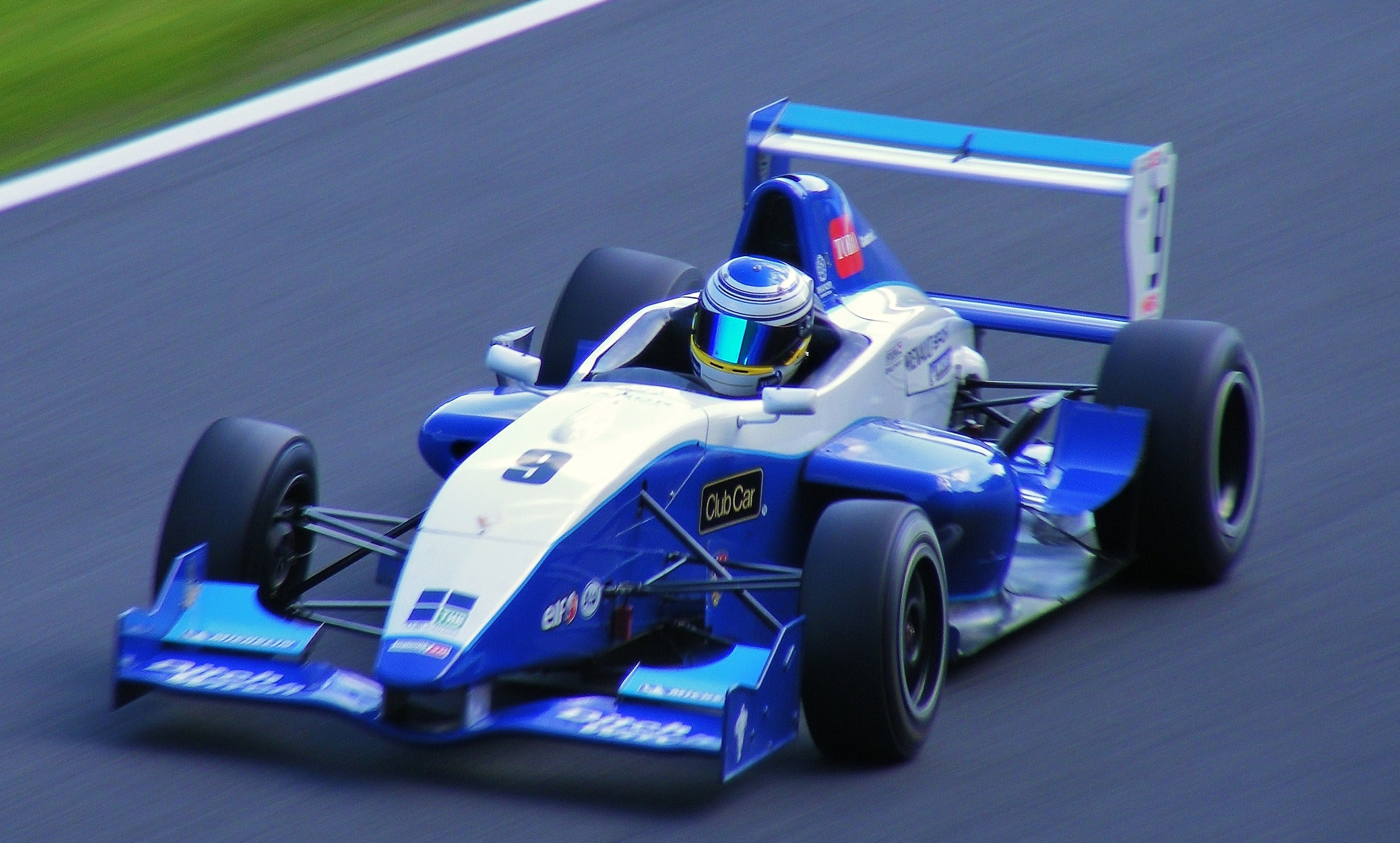
- Nationality: (Netherlands) Dutch
- Born: 20 August 1988 (age 38) Maarn,Utrecht,Netherlands
- Relatives: Bart Hylkema (brother),

Previous series
- GP3 Series

Thomas Hylkema (born 20 August 1988) is a Dutch former racing driver, who drove for Tech 1 Racing in the GP3 Series in 2011. He is the brother of Bart Hylkema, a British Formula 3 racer.

== Career ==
Like most racing drivers, Hylkema started his career in karting, where he was active until 2005. In 2006, he moved to Touring Car racing, where he was 14th in the BRL Light. Hylkema then moved to Formula Racing. He raced in several Formula Renault championships.

=== GP3 Series ===
In 2011 GP3 Series season, Hylkema moved to the GP3 Series. He replaced Andrea Caldarelli at Tech 1 Racing.

=== Complete GP3 Series results ===
(key) (Races in bold indicate pole position) (Races in italics indicate fastest lap)

Year	Entrant	1	2	3	4	5	6	7	8	9	10	11	12	13	14	15	16	DC	Points
2011	Tech 1 Racing	IST; FEA	IST; SPR	CAT; FEA	CAT; SPR	VAL; FEA; Ret	VAL; SPR; Ret	SIL; FEA; 20	SIL; SPR; 21	NÜR; FEA; 18	NÜR; SPR; 24†	HUN; FEA; 27	HUN; SPR; Ret	SPA; FEA; 22	SPA; SPR; 21	MNZ; FEA; 14	MNZ; SPR; Ret	34th	0
