= Lewis Williamson =

British racing driver (born 1989)

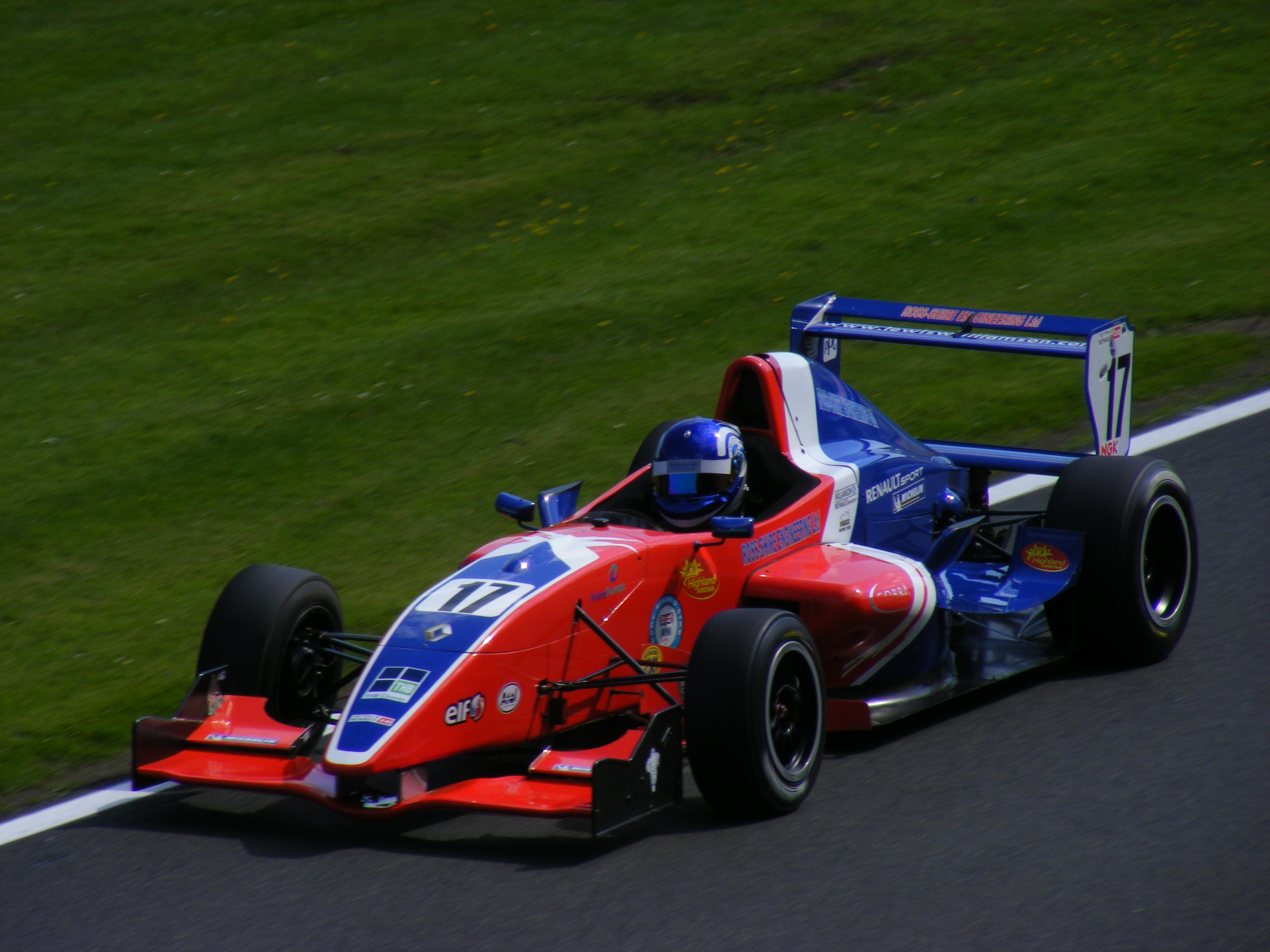
- Lewis Williamson (2009)
- Nationality: (United Kingdom) British
- Born: 11 November 1989 (age 36) Dundee, Scotland

GP3 Series career
- Debut season: 2011
- Current team: Bamboo Engineering
- Categorisation: FIA Silver (until 2017); FIA Gold (2018–)
- Car number: 17
- Former teams: Status Grand Prix; MW Arden
- Starts: 23
- Wins: 1
- Poles: 1
- Fastest laps: 1
- Best finish: 8th in 2011

Previous series
- 2011–12 2009–10 2008 2008 2008: Formula Renault 3.5 Series; Formula Renault UK; FR2.0 Portugal Winter Series; FR2.0 UK Winter Series; Formula Jedi

Championship titles
- 2018: Blancpain Endurance Pro-Am Cup

Awards
- 2010 2009: McLaren Autosport Award; BRDC Rising Star

Lewis Williamson (born 11 November 1989) is a British racing driver from Scotland.

== Career ==
=== Karting ===
Born in Dundee, Williamson began karting at the age of eight, and spent a successful decade racing in the various classes around the United Kingdom. By that time, Williamson moved into the junior formulae in 2008, he had claimed three Scottish karting championship titles at Cadet and MiniMax levels, before taking a clean sweep in 2008. The first driver to record such a feat, Williamson won the British Open, British Grand Prix Super Kart, the Scottish Open, as well as the 125 ICC Championship.

=== Formula Renault ===
After a guest drive in Formula Jedi at Brands Hatch in which he won one of the two races, Williamson moved up into Formula Renault, contesting the 2008 Formula Renault UK Winter Series after Highland Arena Ltd, an organisation set up by three family friends helping to promote sporting talent from the Scottish Highlands – where Williamson resides – leased a car from CR Scuderia. In his second race in the category at Croft, Williamson finished on the podium, taking a third-place finish behind James Calado and Henry Surtees. He added another third place in the final race at Rockingham Motor Speedway, finishing behind Surtees and Dean Stoneman, to end up in sixth place in the championship standings, a point behind fifth-placed William Buller. He also contested the Estoril round of the Portuguese Formula Renault 2.0 Winter Series, taking second and fifth-place finishes for CR Scuderia.

CR Scuderia, under their new name of CRS Racing, signed Williamson for the 2009 season as part of a four-car team alongside Harry Tincknell, Matias Laine and Joshua Scott. Williamson's Winter Series campaign ruled him ineligible for the Graduates Cup for drivers aged nineteen or under. During the season, Williamson finished 17 of the 20 races, taking a third place at Donington Park and a second place at Brands Hatch en route to a tenth place championship finish.

Williamson moved to defending champions Manor Competition for the 2010 season, again as part of a four-car team with Will Stevens, Thomas Hylkema and Josh Mulholland, with Ollie Millroy replacing Mulholland during the season. In the first round of the season at Thruxton, Williamson claimed the first pole position, and thus became the first driver to take pole in the Barazi-Epsilon-designed car introduced for the 2010 season. Several races later at Brands Hatch, Williamson threw away a chance at his first victory, spinning out of the lead and eventually finishing seventh. The first victory came a month later at Oulton Park, overtaking Tom Blomqvist at the start of the first race and was never headed.

Williamson took further wins at Croft and Silverstone – a rescheduled race from Brands Hatch which Williamson had qualified on pole for – as he and Blomqvist commenced their battle for the championship along with Tamás Pál Kiss and Will Stevens. Williamson trailed Pál Kiss by 27 points and Blomqvist by 15 before the World Series by Renault meeting at Silverstone. Williamson won both races from pole position, to trail Blomqvist by one point on dropped scores heading into the final round at Brands Hatch. In the first race, Williamson finished second, ahead of Blomqvist in third, but Blomqvist claimed fastest lap to draw level with Williamson before the final race. In the final race, Blomqvist made a better start and with team-mate Alex Lynn acting as rear gunner, Blomqvist won the championship with his second place. Despite this, Williamson was nominated for the McLaren Autosport BRDC Award due to his performances in the series. On 5 December 2010, after the evaluation tests held at Silverstone, Williamson was named as the winner of the award, taking the £100,000 cash prize and a Formula One test with McLaren.

=== GP3 Series ===
After the end of his Formula Renault campaign, Williamson took part in the post-season GP3 Series test in Estoril, Portugal. Driving for Atech CRS GP, Williamson set the fastest time in the afternoon session on the second and third days, having arrived at the circuit the day before after a chance conversation with team boss David Hayle. Williamson was eventually signed by MW Arden to graduate into GP3 in February 2011.

Williamson competed in the 2013 GP3 Series with Bamboo Engineering. He did not compete in the final round at Yas Marina Circuit, and finished the season in 12th position, his best finish being 3rd place.

=== Formula Renault 3.5 Series ===
After testing for ISR Racing during the final test session of 2010, Williamson took part in the opening round of the 2011 season for the team at Motorland Aragón, deputising for regular driver Daniel Ricciardo who was on third driver duties for Scuderia Toro Rosso at the Chinese Grand Prix.

== Personal life ==
Williamson combines his racing with an apprenticeship at Ross-Shire Engineering, working as a fabrication engineer in Muir of Ord, a 100-mile round trip from his home in Golspie.

== Racing record ==
=== Career summary ===
Season	Series	Team	Races	Wins	Poles	F/Laps	Podiums	Points	Position
2008	Formula Renault UK Winter Series	Highland Arena Ltd.	4	0	0	0	2	57	6th
2008	Formula Renault 2.0 Portugal Winter Series	CR Scuderia	2	0	0	0	1	18	4th
2008	Formula Jedi	Team Jedi	2	1	2	0	1	?	?
2009	Formula Renault UK	CRS Racing	20	0	0	0	2	229	10th
2010	Formula Renault UK	Manor Competition	20	5	5	4	9	459	**2nd**
2011	GP3 Series	MW Arden	16	1	0	1	2	31	8th
2011	Formula Renault 3.5 Series	ISR Racing	4	0	0	0	0	0	33rd
2012	GP3 Series	Status Grand Prix	8	0	0	0	0	11	17th
2012	Formula Renault 3.5 Series	Arden Caterham	5	0	0	0	0	0	32nd
2013	GP3 Series	Bamboo Engineering	14	0	0	0	1	44	12th
2016	Renault Sport Trophy - Pro	Strakka Racing	3	1	2	1	2	43	6th
2016	Renault Sport Endurance Trophy	Strakka Racing	2	0	1	1	1	21	15th
2016	FIA World Endurance Championship - LMP2	Strakka Racing	4	0	0	0	0	32	18th
2017	Blancpain GT Series Sprint Cup	Strakka Racing	10	0	0	0	0	0	NC
2017	Blancpain GT Series Sprint Cup - Silver Cup	Strakka Racing	10	3	3	3	8	110	**2nd**
2017	Blancpain GT Series Endurance Cup	Strakka Racing	5	0	0	0	0	4	37th
2017	Blancpain GT Series Endurance Cup - Pro-Am	Strakka Racing	4	0	0	0	0	12	29th
2018	Blancpain GT Series Endurance Cup	Strakka Racing	5	0	0	0	0	2	44th
2018	Blancpain GT Series Endurance Cup - Pro-Am	Strakka Racing	5	0	1	2	2	92	**1st**
2018	Intercontinental GT Challenge	Mercedes-AMG Team Strakka Racing	4	0	0	0	1	30	10th
2019	Blancpain GT Series Endurance Cup	Strakka Racing	4	0	0	0	0	10	23rd
2019	Intercontinental GT Challenge	Mercedes-AMG Team Strakka Racing	4	0	0	0	0	2	24th
2020	GT World Challenge Europe Endurance Cup	Ema Group/Team 59Racing	1	0	0	0	0	0	NC
2022	British GT Championship - GT3	2 Seas Motorsport	9	0	1	0	2	114	4th
2022	Lamborghini Super Trofeo Europe - Pro-Am	Oregon Team	12	5	4	0	10	142	**1st**
2023	GT World Challenge Europe Endurance Cup	GetSpeed	1	0	0	0	0	0	NC
2024	GT World Challenge Europe Endurance Cup	2 Seas Motorsport	2	0	0	0	0	0	NC
2025	GT World Challenge Europe Endurance Cup	2 Seas Motorsport	1	0	0	0	0	0	NC
2026	GT World Challenge Europe Endurance Cup	2 Seas Motorsport	1	0	0	0	0	0	NC

^{*} Season still in progress.

=== Complete GP3 Series results ===
(key) (Races in bold indicate pole position) (Races in italics indicate fastest lap)

Year	Entrant	1	2	3	4	5	6	7	8	9	10	11	12	13	14	15	16	DC	Points
2011	MW Arden	IST; FEA; Ret	IST; SPR; 20	CAT; FEA; 14	CAT; SPR; 9	**VAL**; **FEA**; 2	VAL; SPR; 6	SIL; FEA; 7	SIL; SPR; 1	NÜR; FEA; 2	NÜR; SPR; 14	HUN; FEA; 6	HUN; SPR; Ret	SPA; FEA; 9	SPA; SPR; DNS	MNZ; FEA; 18	MNZ; SPR; 10	8th	31
2012	Status Grand Prix	CAT; FEA	CAT; SPR	MON; FEA	MON; SPR	VAL; FEA	VAL; SPR	SIL; FEA	SIL; SPR	HOC; FEA; 13	HOC; SPR; Ret	HUN; FEA; 10	HUN; SPR; 5	SPA; FEA; 8	SPA; SPR; 7	MNZ; FEA; 19	MNZ; SPR; Ret	17th	11
2013	Bamboo Engineering	CAT; FEA; 11	CAT; SPR; 7	VAL; FEA; 19	VAL; SPR; 17	SIL; FEA; 25†	SIL; SPR; 14	NÜR; FEA; 4	NÜR; SPR; 4	HUN; FEA; 24	HUN; SPR; Ret	SPA; FEA; 14	SPA; SPR; 10	MNZ; FEA; 4	MNZ; SPR; 3	YMC; FEA	YMC; SPR	11th	44

=== Complete Formula Renault 3.5 Series results ===
(key) (Races in bold indicate pole position) (Races in italics indicate fastest lap)

Year	Team	1	2	3	4	5	6	7	8	9	10	11	12	13	14	15	16	17	Pos	Points
2011	ISR Racing	ALC; 1; 15	ALC; 2; 20	SPA; 1	SPA; 2	MNZ; 1	MNZ; 2	MON; 1	NÜR; 1	NÜR; 2	HUN; 1	HUN; 2	SIL; 1	SIL; 2	LEC; 1	LEC; 2	CAT; 1; 18	CAT; 2 Ret	33rd	0
2012	Arden Caterham	ALC; 1; 14	ALC; 2 Ret	MON; 1; 13	SPA; 1; 19	SPA; 2; 16	NÜR; 1	NÜR; 2	MSC; 1	MSC; 2	SIL; 1	SIL; 2	HUN; 1	HUN; 2	LEC; 1	LEC; 2	CAT; 1	CAT; 2	32nd	0

=== Complete FIA World Endurance Championship results ===
Year	Entrant	Class	Car	Engine	1	2	3	4	5	6	7	8	9	Rank	Points
2016	Strakka Racing	LMP2	Gibson 015S	Nissan VK45DE 4.5 L V8	SIL	SPA	LMS	NÜR; 4	MEX; 4	COA; Ret	FUJ; 6	SHA	BHR	18th	32

=== Complete GT World Challenge Europe results ===
==== GT World Challenge Europe Endurance Cup ====
Year	Team	Car	Class	1	2	3	4	5	6	7	Pos.	Points
2017	Strakka Racing	McLaren 650S GT3	Pro-Am	MNZ; Ret		LEC; 38	SPA; 6H; 28	SPA; 12H; 48	SPA; 24H; Ret	CAT; 22	29th	12
2017	Strakka Racing	McLaren 650S GT3	Pro		SIL; 8						37th	4
2018	Strakka Racing	Mercedes-AMG GT3	Pro-Am	MNZ; 25	SIL; 24	LEC; 26	SPA; 6H; 8	SPA; 12H; 6	SPA; 24H; 17	**CAT**; 39	1st	92
2019	Strakka Racing	Mercedes-AMG GT3	Pro	MNZ; 22	SIL; 5	LEC; Ret	SPA; 6H; 32	SPA; 12H; 12	SPA; 24H; 10	CAT	23rd	10
2020	Ema Group/Team 59Racing	McLaren 720S GT3	Pro	IMO; 35	NÜR	SPA; 6H	SPA; 12H	SPA; 24H	LEC		NC	0
2023	GetSpeed	Mercedes-AMG GT3 Evo	Pro-Am	MNZ	LEC	SPA; 6H; 60	SPA; 12H; Ret	SPA; 24H; Ret	NÜR	CAT	20th	3
2024	2 Seas Motorsport	Mercedes-AMG GT3 Evo	Gold	LEC; 33	SPA; 6H; 20	SPA; 12H; 53	SPA; 24H; 42	NÜR	MNZ	JED	8th	39
2025	2 Seas Motorsport	Mercedes-AMG GT3 Evo	Bronze	LEC	MNZ	SPA; 6H; 56	SPA; 12H; 40	SPA; 24H; 26	NÜR	CAT	34th	6
2026	2 Seas Motorsport	Mercedes-AMG GT3 Evo	Bronze	LEC	MNZ	SPA; 6H; 61	SPA; 12H; 53	SPA; 24H; 44	NÜR	ALG	35th	4

==== GT World Challenge Europe Sprint Cup ====
Year	Team	Car	Class	1	2	3	4	5	6	7	8	9	10	Pos.	Points
2017	Strakka Racing	McLaren 650S GT3	Silver	**MIS**; **QR**; 19	MIS; CR; 13	**BRH**; **QR**; 14	BRH; CR; 11	**ZOL**; **QR**; 11	ZOL; CR; 25	HUN; QR; 25	HUN; CR; Ret	NÜR; QR; 17	NÜR; CR; 13	2nd	110

=== Complete British GT Championship results ===
(key) (Races in bold indicate pole position) (Races in italics indicate fastest lap)

Year	Team	Car	Class	1	2	3	4	5	6	7	8	9	DC	Points
2022	2 Seas Motorsport	Mercedes-AMG GT3 Evo	GT3	OUL; 1; 5	OUL; 2 Ret	SIL; 1 Ret	DON; 1; 2	SNE; 1; 4	SNE; 2; 7	SPA; 1; 2	**BRH**; **1**; 4	DON; 1; 9	4th	114

Sporting positions
Preceded by Jonathan Adam; Ahmad Al Harthy	Blancpain GT Series Endurance Cup; Pro-Am Champion; 2018; With: Nick Leventis & Chris Buncombe	Succeeded by Charlie Eastwood; Ahmad Al Harthy; Salih Yoluç
Awards
Preceded by Dean Smith	McLaren Autosport BRDC Award; 2010	Succeeded by Oliver Rowland
