= Adrian Quaife-Hobbs =

British racing driver (born 1991)

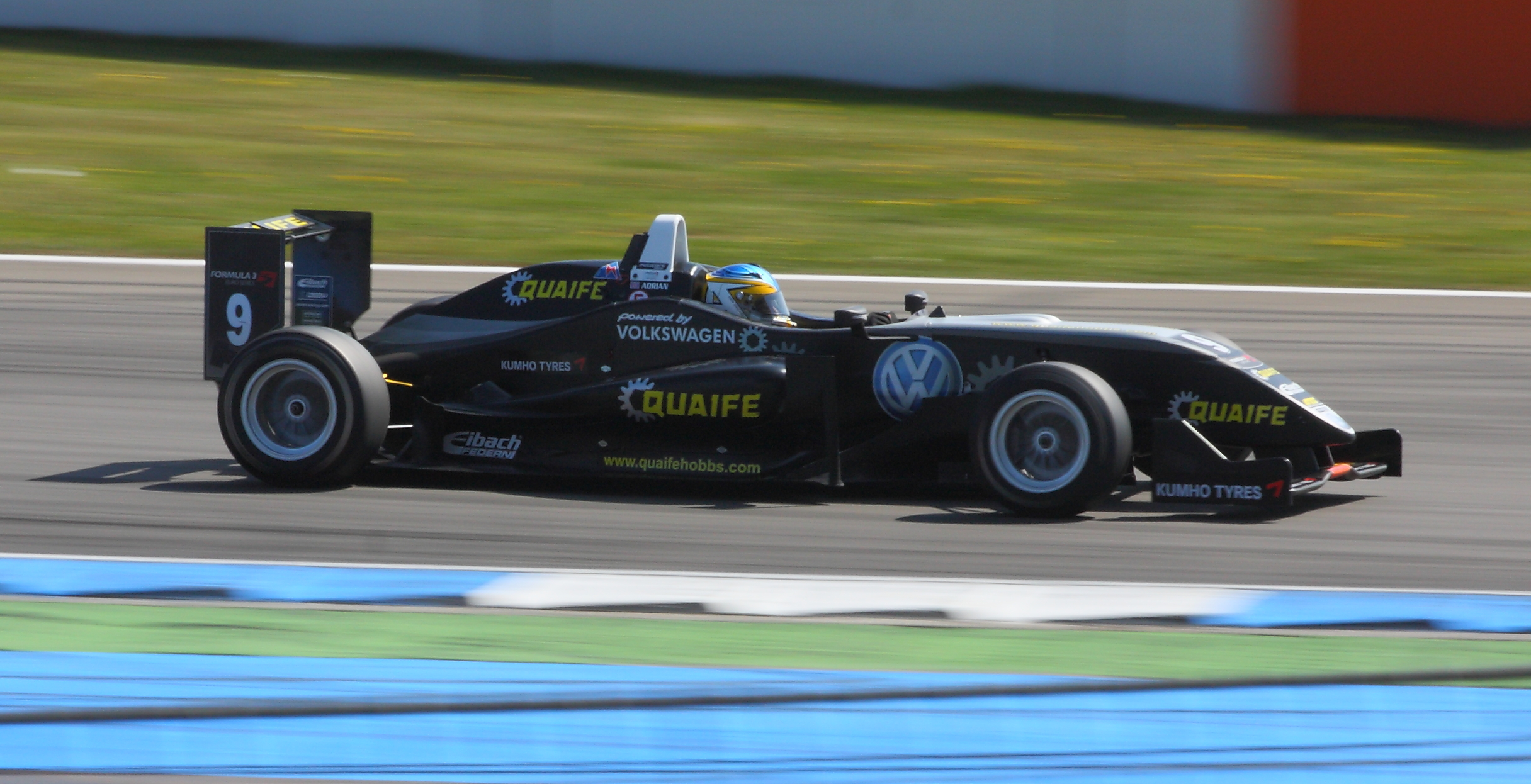
- Nationality: British
- Born: Adrian Rodney Quaife-Hobbs; 3 February 1991 (age 35) Pembury, United Kingdom
- Relatives: Rod Quaife (father); Phil Quaife (cousin)

Blancpain Endurance Series career
- Debut season: 2015
- Current team: Von Ryan Racing
- Categorisation: FIA Gold
- Car number: 59

Previous series
- 2013–14 2012 2010–11 2010 2008 2008 2007, 2009 2007–09 2007 2005–06 2005: GP2 Series; Auto GP World Series; GP3 Series; Formula 3 Euro Series; Portuguese FR2.0 W. Series; Formula Renault 2.0 Italia; Formula Renault 2.0 NEC; Eurocup Formula Renault 2.0; Formula BMW UK; T Cars; T Cars Autumn Trophy

Championship titles
- 2012 2005 2005: Auto GP World Series; T Cars; T Cars Autumn Trophy

Awards
- 2007 2006: MSA British Race Elite; BRDC Rising Star Award

Adrian Rodney Quaife-Hobbs (born 3 February 1991) is a British former racing driver, notable for being the youngest driver to win the T Cars championship and the youngest ever winner of a MSA-sanctioned car racing series. He is the son of Rod Quaife, founder of Quaife Electronics.

== Career ==
=== Early career ===
Quaife-Hobbs was born in Pembury. He began his career in 2002, racing in the Honda cadets category, winning four races in his first season and coming second in the Formula 6 Championship. 2003 saw Quaife-Hobbs move up to the more powerful Mini Max category where he took several podium finishes and a race victory. Quaife-Hobbs continued racing in the Mini Max series for 2004, winning the Bayford Meadows Championship. At the age of 14, Quaife-Hobbs moved up to the T Cars category where he won both the main T Cars Championship title, becoming the youngest Champion in the series' history at 14 years and eight months old, and winning the Autumn Trophy title as well. In 2006, Quaife-Hobbs competed in the first few T-car races and got a double win in the opening rounds and also won his last race at Rockingham before deciding to focus on a 2007 campaign in Formula BMW. 2006 also saw Quaife-Hobbs win the British Racing Drivers' Club's Rising Star Award, becoming the youngest driver to receive the award at the age of fifteen.

=== Formula BMW ===
For 2007, Quaife-Hobbs was promoted to the Formula BMW class, running in its UK series, racing for the current Champions Fortec Motorsport. The young Brit established himself in the first meeting of the championship at Brands Hatch, coming eleventh on his debut and running in third for a majority of the second race before tyre issues forced him to yield the final podium place to Valle Mäkelä, the winner of race one. Quaife-Hobbs finished his debut season tenth in the Drivers' Championship with 405 points.

=== Formula Renault ===
Following the closure of the 2007 FBMW UK season, Quaife-Hobbs decided to enter the Formula Renault Eurocup with BVM Minardi to gain experience in the Formula Renault cars. He did well on his debut, despite retiring in the first race, he finished eighth in the second from thirteenth position, enough to earn him three points. Quaife-Hobbs also competed in two Formula Renault NEC races with Motopark Academy and at Spa, he got his first Formula Renault podium in only his third event. 2007 also saw Quaife-Hobbs win a place on the prestigious MSA British Race Elite scheme run by David Brabham.

Quaife-Hobbs entered the Eurocup for a full season in 2008 as well as the Italian championship, both with the BVM Minardi team in which he finished fourth. He returned to Motopark Academy for 2009 campaigns in the Eurocup and Northern European Cup, finishing fourth in both series.

=== Formula Three ===
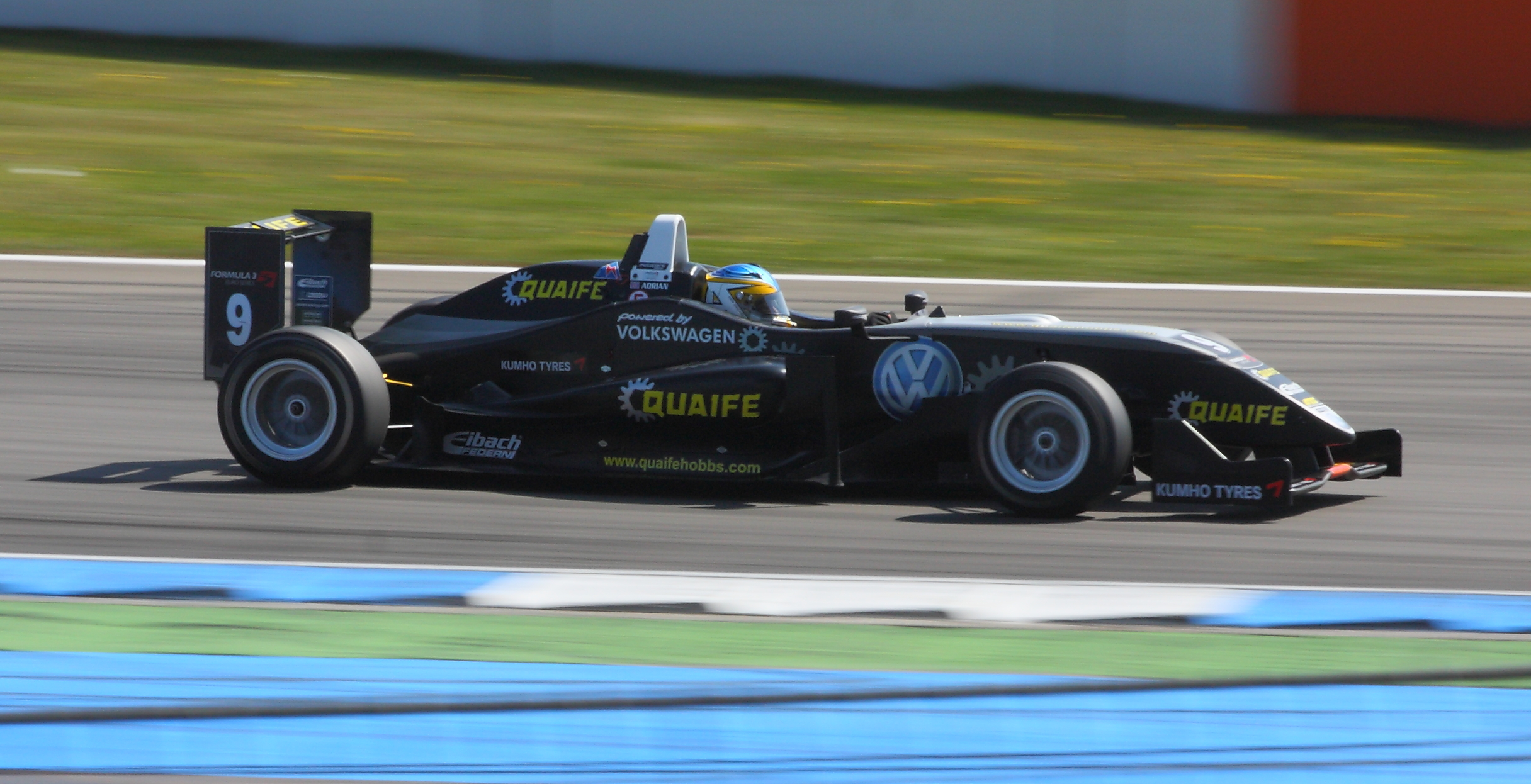
Quaife-Hobbs competing at the second round of the 2010 Formula 3 Euro Series at Hockenheim.

Quaife-Hobbs stepped up into the Formula 3 Euro Series for the 2010 season, staying with Motopark Academy for his graduation into the series. He earned points in first races of the Circuit Paul Ricard and Hockenheim meetings, finishing sixth and fifth respectively.

=== GP3 Series ===
After the Euro Series opener, Quaife-Hobbs elected to concentrate on the new-for-2010 GP3 Series, signing a contract with Manor Racing. At Spa he secured his first podium. He finished in fifteenth position in the championship standings.

Quaife-Hobbs stayed in GP3 for 2011 with Manor. He achieved his first win at Valencia. At the end of the season, he improved to fifth position in the drivers' championship, and as he finished as the best-placed Marussia Manor driver in the championship, he received a Formula One test with Marussia Virgin Racing.

=== Auto GP World Series ===
In 2012 Quaife-Hobbs graduated to the Auto GP World Series, competing for Super Nova International. Since the start of the season, he has taken victory in Monza and Valencia, notching up two pole positions, five podium finishes from six rounds and currently leads the series by 29 points.

He went on to take every pole bar one throughout the season, and took the championship.

=== GP2 Series ===
For 2013, Quaife-Hobbs was signed to race for MP Motorsport in the GP2 Series. The highlight of the first half of the season was a second place at Monaco, before he switched to Hilmer Motorsport from Hungary onwards. Following a second podium in Belgium, Quaife-Hobbs scored his maiden GP2 victory at Monza in the sprint race. He finished the season 13th overall, with a total of 56 points and one win.

For 2014, Quaife-Hobbs remained in GP2, but drove for the Rapax Team alongside Simon Trummer. For the second season in a row, he finished the year in 13th position in the championship standings.

=== GT3 ===
For the 2015 season, Quaife-Hobbs moved into endurance racing with the Von Ryan Racing team. He contested selected rounds of the Blancpain Endurance Series and British GT Championship, driving a McLaren 650S in the GT3 class. On his début in the British series, Quaife-Hobbs and his co-driver, Gilles Vannelet, took victory in the Silverstone 500.

== Racing record ==
=== Career summary ===
Season	Series	Team	Races	Wins	Poles	FLaps	Podiums	Points	Position
2005	T Cars	PR Motorsport	17	8	2	?	10	284	**1st**
2005	T Cars Autumn Trophy	PR Motorsport	7	6	7	?	7	138	**1st**
2006	T Cars	PR Motorsport	10	3	3	?	7	68	9th
2007	Formula BMW UK	Fortec Motorsport	18	0	1	0	0	405	10th
2007	Eurocup Formula Renault 2.0	BVM Minardi	8	0	0	0	0	3	23rd
2007	Formula Renault 2.0 NEC	Motopark Academy	4	0	0	0	1	70	18th
2008	Italian Formula Renault 2.0	BVM Minardi	14	1	0	1	4	250	4th
2008	Eurocup Formula Renault 2.0	BVM Minardi	14	0	0	0	0	2	25th
2008	Portugal Winter Series FR2.0	Motopark Academy	2	0	0	0	1	16	6th
2009	Formula Renault 2.0 NEC	Motopark Academy	14	1	1	2	3	229	4th
2009	Eurocup Formula Renault 2.0	Motopark Academy	14	1	0	0	4	83	4th
2010	Formula 3 Euro Series	Motopark Academy	4	0	0	0	0	7	13th
2010	GP3 Series	Manor Racing	14	0	0	0	1	10	15th
2011	GP3 Series	Manor Racing	16	1	2	2	2	36	5th
2011	Formula One	Virgin Racing	Test driver						
2012	Auto GP World Series	Super Nova International	14	5	6	4	10	221	**1st**
2013	GP2 Series	MP Motorsport	12	0	0	0	1	56	13th
2013	GP2 Series	Hilmer Motorsport	10	1	0	0	2	56	13th
2014	GP2 Series	Rapax	18	0	0	0	1	30	13th
2015	Blancpain Endurance Series	Von Ryan Racing	5	0	0	0	0	10	20th
2015	British GT Championship	Von Ryan Racing	1	1	0	0	1	37.5	13th
2016	GT3 Le Mans Cup	FFF Racing Team by ACM	6	0	0	0	2	46	5th

=== Complete Eurocup Formula Renault 2.0 results ===
(key) (Races in bold indicate pole position; races in italics indicate fastest lap)

Year	Entrant	1	2	3	4	5	6	7	8	9	10	11	12	13	14	DC	Points
2007	BVM Minardi	ZOL; 1	ZOL; 2	NÜR; 1	NÜR; 2	HUN; 1	HUN; 2	DON; 1 Ret	DON; 2; 9	MAG; 1 Ret	MAG; 2; 30†	EST; 1; 20	EST; 2; 19	CAT; 1; 27	CAT; 2; 20	23rd	3
2008	BVM Minardi	SPA; 1 Ret	SPA; 2 Ret	SIL; 1; 11	SIL; 2; 9	HUN; 1; 14	HUN; 2; 19	NÜR; 1; 29	NÜR; 2; 24	LMS; 1 Ret	LMS; 2 Ret	EST; 1; 16	EST; 2 Ret	CAT; 1 Ret	CAT; 2; 14	26th	2
2009	Motopark Academy	CAT; 1; 8	CAT; 2 Ret	SPA; 1; 4	SPA; 2; 3	HUN; 1; 6	**HUN**; **2**; 1	SIL; 1; 9	SIL; 2; 3	LMS; 1; 14	LMS; 2; 6	NÜR; 1; 4	NÜR; 2; 9	ALC; 1; 6	ALC; 2; 4	4th	83

=== Complete Formula Renault 2.0 NEC results ===
(key) (Races in bold indicate pole position) (Races in italics indicate fastest lap)

Year	Entrant	1	2	3	4	5	6	7	8	9	10	11	12	13	14	15	16	DC	Points
2007	Motopark Academy	ZAN; 1	ZAN; 2	OSC; 1	OSC; 2	ASS; 1	ASS; 2	ZOL; 1	ZOL; 1	NUR; 1	NUR; 2	OSC; 1	OSC; 2; 4	SPA; 1; 5	SPA; 2; 3	HOC; 1; 4	HOC; 2	18th	70
2009	Motopark Academy	**ZAN**; **1**; 1	ZAN; 2; 17	HOC; 1; 2	HOC; 2; 15	ALA; 1	ALA; 2	OSC; 1; 3	OSC; 2; 10	ASS; 1; 5	ASS; 2; 5	MST; 1; 5	MST; 2; 7	NÜR; 1; 7	NÜR; 2; 2	SPA; 1; 4	SPA; 2; 4	4th	229

=== Complete Formula 3 Euro Series results ===
(key)

Year	Entrant	Chassis	Engine	1	2	3	4	5	6	7	8	9	10	11	12	13	14	15	16	17	18	DC	Points
2010	Motopark Academy	Dallara F308/099	Volkswagen	LEC; 1; 6	LEC; 2; 9	HOC; 1; 5	HOC; 2; 7	VAL; 1	VAL; 2	NOR; 1	NOR; 2	NÜR; 1	NÜR; 2	ZAN; 1	ZAN; 2	BRH; 1	BRH; 2	OSC; 1	OSC; 2	HOC; 1	HOC; 2	13th	7

=== Complete GP3 Series results ===
(key) (Races in bold indicate pole position) (Races in italics indicate fastest lap)

Year	Entrant	1	2	3	4	5	6	7	8	9	10	11	12	13	14	15	16	DC	Points
2010	Manor Racing	CAT; FEA; 21	CAT; SPR; 26	IST; FEA; Ret	IST; SPR; Ret	VAL; FEA; 12	VAL; SPR; 5	SIL; FEA; Ret	SIL; SPR; Ret	HOC; FEA; DNS	HOC; SPR; 18	HUN; FEA; 12	HUN; SPR; 7	SPA; FEA; 3	SPA; SPR; 5	MNZ; FEA; 17	MNZ; SPR; 22	15th	10
2011	Marussia Manor Racing	IST; FEA; 24	IST; SPR; 16	CAT; FEA; 11	CAT; SPR; 23	VAL; FEA; 1	VAL; SPR; 8	**SIL**; **FEA**; 4	SIL; SPR; 15	NÜR; FEA; 5	NÜR; SPR; Ret	HUN; FEA; 3	HUN; SPR; 10	SPA; FEA; 4	SPA; SPR; Ret	**MNZ**; **FEA**; Ret	MNZ; SPR; 6	5th	36

=== Complete Auto GP World Series results ===
(key) (Races in bold indicate pole position) (Races in italics indicate fastest lap)

Year	Entrant	1	2	3	4	5	6	7	8	9	10	11	12	13	14	Pos	Points
2012	Super Nova International	**MNZ**; **1**; 1	MNZ; 2; 3	**VAL**; **1**; 2	VAL; 2; 1	MAR; 1; 2	MAR; 2; 4	**HUN**; **1**; 1	HUN; 2; 2	**ALG**; **1**; 1	ALG; 2; 1	**CUR**; **1**; 6	CUR; 2; 12†	**SON**; **1** Ret	SON; 2; 2	**1st**	**221**

^{†} Driver retired, but was classified as they completed 90% of the winner's race distance.

=== Complete GP2 Series results ===
(key) (Races in bold indicate pole position) (Races in italics indicate fastest lap)

Year	Entrant	1	2	3	4	5	6	7	8	9	10	11	12	13	14	15	16	17	18	19	20	21	22	DC	Points
2013	MP Motorsport	SEP; FEA; Ret	SEP; SPR; 17	BHR; FEA; 7	BHR; SPR; 8	CAT; FEA; 17	CAT; SPR; 21	MON; FEA; 8	MON; SPR; 2	SIL; FEA; 12	SIL; SPR; 11	NÜR; FEA; Ret	NÜR; SPR; 16											13th	56
2013	Hilmer Motorsport													HUN; FEA; 18	HUN; SPR; Ret	SPA; FEA; 10	SPA; SPR; 3	MNZ; FEA; 7	MNZ; SPR; 1	MRN; FEA; 22	MRN; SPR; 8	YMC; FEA; 11	YMC; SPR; 21†	13th	56
2014	Rapax	BHR; FEA; 10	BHR; SPR; 6	CAT; FEA; 9	CAT; SPR; 9	MON; FEA; 9	MON; SPR; 8	RBR; FEA; 24	RBR; SPR; 18	SIL; FEA; 13	SIL; SPR; 15	HOC; FEA; 14	HOC; SPR; 8	HUN; FEA; 2	HUN; SPR; 12	SPA; FEA; 11	SPA; SPR; 21	MNZ; FEA; 11	MNZ; SPR; 8	SOC; FEA	SOC; SPR	YMC; FEA	YMC; SPR	13th	30

=== Complete British GT Championship results ===
(key) (Races in bold indicate pole position) (Races in italics indicate fastest lap)

Year	Team	Car	Class	1	2	3	4	5	6	7	8	9	DC	Points
2015	Von Ryan Racing	McLaren 650S GT3	GT3	OUL; 1	OUL; 2	ROC; 1	SIL; 1; 1	SPA; 1	BRH; 1	SNE; 1	SNE; 2	DON; 1	13th	37.5

Sporting positions
Preceded by Will Bratt	T Cars Champion; 2005	Succeeded by Luciano Bacheta
Preceded by N/A	T Cars Autumn Trophy; 2005	Succeeded by N/A
Preceded by Kevin Ceccon	Auto GP World Series; Drivers' Champion; 2012	Succeeded by Vittorio Ghirelli
Awards
Preceded by Incumbent	BRDC Rising Star Award; 2006	Succeeded by Jeremy Metcalfe
Preceded by Incumbent	MSA British Race Elite; 2007	Succeeded by Incumbent
