= 2013 Silverstone GP2 Series round =

Motor race in the United Kingdom

(United Kingdom) 2013 Silverstone GP2 round
Round details
- Round 5 of 11 rounds in the 2013 GP2 Series
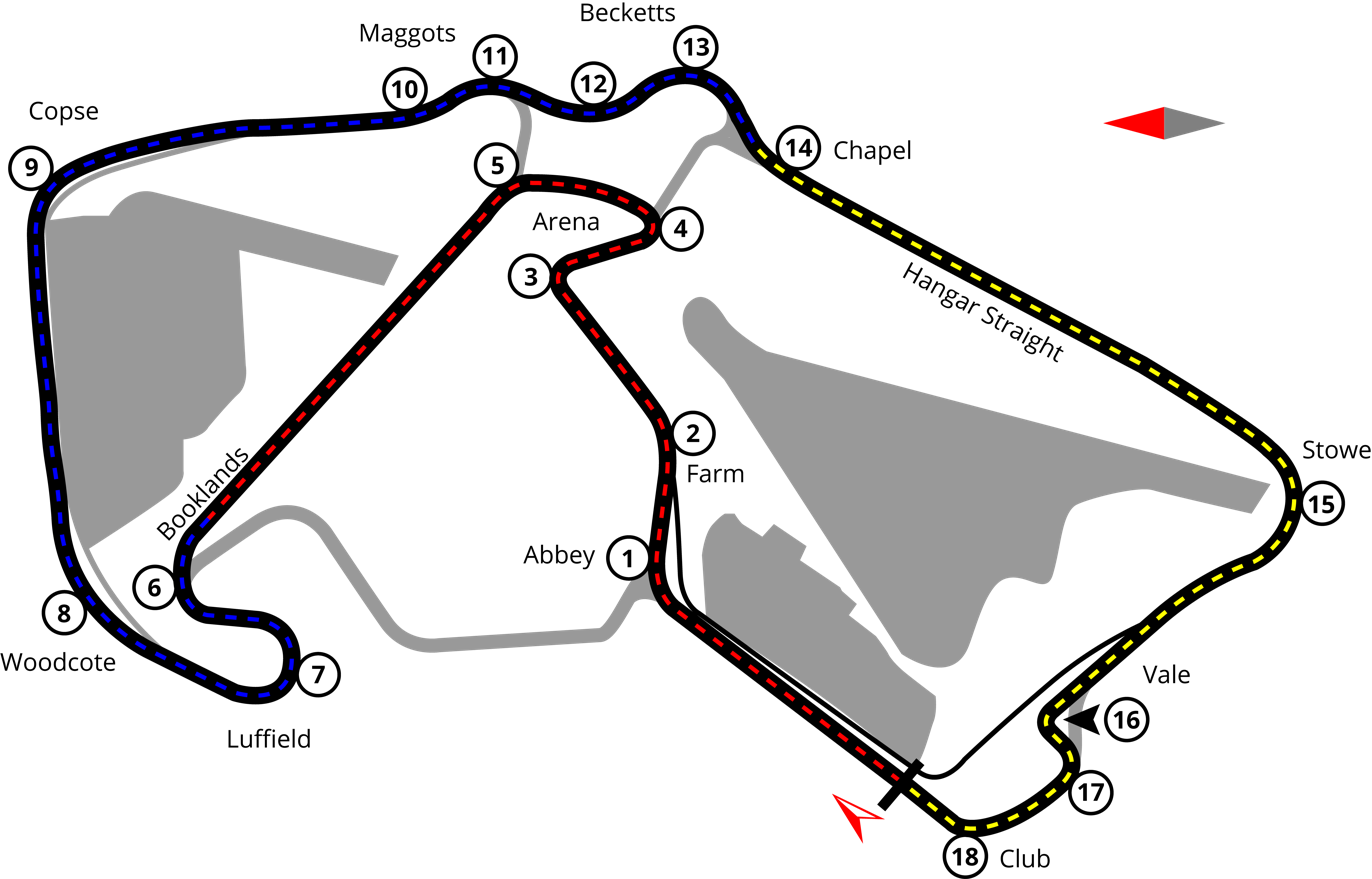
- Silverstone
- Location: Silverstone Circuit; Silverstone, United Kingdom
- Course: Permanent racing facility 5.901 km (3.667 mi)

GP2 Series

Feature race
- Date: 29 June 2013
- Laps: 29

Pole position
Driver	(Sweden) Marcus Ericsson	DAMS
- Time: 1:40.716

Podium
First	(United Kingdom) Sam Bird	Russian Time
Second	(Monaco) Stéphane Richelmi	DAMS
Third	(France) Tom Dillmann	Russian Time

Fastest lap
Driver	(New Zealand) Mitch Evans (Note: Mitch Evans set the fastest lap, but did not finish in the top 10, so was ineligible to be the point-scorer for the fastest lap. Tom Dillmann was the point-scorer instead for setting the fastest lap of those finishing in the top 10.)	Arden International
- Time: 1:41.832 (on lap 22)

Sprint race
- Date: 30 June 2013
- Laps: 21

Podium
First	(United Kingdom) Jon Lancaster	Hilmer Motorsport
Second	(Indonesia) Rio Haryanto	Barwa Addax Team
Third	(United Kingdom) James Calado	ART Grand Prix

Fastest lap
Driver	(United Kingdom) Jon Lancaster	Hilmer Motorsport
- Time: 1:43.047 (on lap 6)

The 2013 Silverstone GP2 Series round was a GP2 Series motor race held on 29 and 30 June 2013 at Silverstone Circuit in Silverstone, United Kingdom. It was the fifth round of the 2013 GP2 Season. The race supported the 2013 British Grand Prix.

Sam Bird took back-to-back Feature Race victories while Jon Lancaster of Hilmer Motorsport won his first race of the season in the Sprint race.

== Classification ==
=== Qualifying ===
Pos.	No.	Driver	Team	Time	Grid
1	1	(Sweden) Marcus Ericsson	DAMS	1:40.716	1
2	11	(United Kingdom) Sam Bird	Russian Time	1:41.087	2
3	9	(Brazil) Felipe Nasr	Carlin	1:41.144	3
4	18	(Monaco) Stefano Coletti	Rapax	1:41.219	4
5	2	(Monaco) Stéphane Richelmi	DAMS	1:41.411	5
6	8	(Switzerland) Fabio Leimer	Racing Engineering	1:41.442	6
7	17	(Indonesia) Rio Haryanto	Barwa Addax Team	1:41.537	7
8	6	(New Zealand) Mitch Evans	Arden International	1:41.563	8
9	12	(France) Tom Dillmann	Russian Time	1:41.633	9
10	3	(United Kingdom) James Calado	ART Grand Prix	1:41.662	10
11	7	(Colombia) Julián Leal	Racing Engineering	1:41.765	11
12	25	(Italy) Fabrizio Crestani	Venezuela GP Lazarus	1:41.771	12
13	20	(France) Nathanaël Berthon	Trident Racing	1:41.812	13
14	14	(Spain) Sergio Canamasas	EQ8 Caterham Racing	1:41.881	14
15	21	(Italy) Kevin Ceccon	Trident Racing	1:41.890	15
16	22	(Netherlands) Robin Frijns	Hilmer Motorsport	1:41.970	16
17	23	(United Kingdom) Jon Lancaster	Hilmer Motorsport	1:41.978	17
18	5	(Venezuela) Johnny Cecotto Jr.	Arden International	1:42.013	18
19	15	(United States) Alexander Rossi	EQ8 Caterham Racing	1:42.020	19
20	10	(United Kingdom) Jolyon Palmer	Carlin	1:42.207	20
21	19	(Switzerland) Simon Trummer	Rapax	1:42.213	21
22	24	(Austria) René Binder	Venezuela GP Lazarus	1:42.376	22
23	16	(United States) Jake Rosenzweig	Barwa Addax Team	1:42.402	23
24	26	(United Kingdom) Adrian Quaife-Hobbs	MP Motorsport	1:42.658	24
25	4	(Germany) Daniel Abt	ART Grand Prix	1:42.687	25
26	27	(Netherlands) Daniël de Jong	MP Motorsport	1:42.862	26

=== Feature race ===
Pos.	No.	Driver	Team	Laps	Time/Retired	Grid	Points
1	11	(United Kingdom) Sam Bird	Russian Time	29	51:32.250	2	25
2	2	(Monaco) Stéphane Richelmi	DAMS	29	+2.427	5	18
3	12	(France) Tom Dillmann	Russian Time	29	+12.052	9	17 (15+2)
4	8	(Switzerland) Fabio Leimer	Racing Engineering	29	+13.888	6	12
5	23	(United Kingdom) Jon Lancaster	Hilmer Motorsport	29	+14.782	17	10
6	10	(United Kingdom) Jolyon Palmer	Carlin	29	+18.762	20	8
7	17	(Indonesia) Rio Haryanto	Barwa Addax Team	29	+19.734	7	6
8	7	(Colombia) Julián Leal	Racing Engineering	29	+20.365	11	4
9	3	(United Kingdom) James Calado	ART Grand Prix	29	+26.626	10	2
10	15	(United States) Alexander Rossi	EQ8 Caterham Racing	29	+30.352	19	1
11	1	(Sweden) Marcus Ericsson	DAMS	29	+32.235	1	(4)
12	26	(United Kingdom) Adrian Quaife-Hobbs	MP Motorsport	29	+32.829	24	
13	22	(Netherlands) Robin Frijns	Hilmer Motorsport	29	+42.265	16	
14	16	(United States) Jake Rosenzweig	Barwa Addax Team	29	+44.623	23	
15	4	(Germany) Daniel Abt	ART Grand Prix	29	+47.519	25	
16	24	(Austria) René Binder	Venezuela GP Lazarus	29	+49.683	22	
17	5	(Venezuela) Johnny Cecotto Jr.	Arden International	29	+1:00.115	18	
18	25	(Italy) Fabrizio Crestani	Venezuela GP Lazarus	29	+1:01.120	12	
19	6	(New Zealand) Mitch Evans	Arden International	29	+1:03.532	8	
20	20	(France) Nathanaël Berthon	Trident Racing	29	+1:04.852	13	
21	18	(Monaco) Stefano Coletti	Rapax	28	Retired	4	
22	27	(Netherlands) Daniël de Jong	MP Motorsport	28	+1 lap	26	
23	14	(Spain) Sergio Canamasas	EQ8 Caterham Racing	28	+1 lap	14	
24	19	(Switzerland) Simon Trummer	Rapax	28	+1 lap	21	
Ret	9	(Brazil) Felipe Nasr	Carlin Motorsport	17	Retired	3	
Ret	21	(Italy) Kevin Ceccon	Trident Racing	2	Retired	15	
Fastest lap: Tom Dillmann (Russian Time) — 1:43.191 (on lap 21)

=== Sprint race ===
Pos.	No.	Driver	Team	Laps	Time/Retired	Grid	Points
1	23	(United Kingdom) Jon Lancaster	Hilmer Motorsport	21	37:19.528	4	17 (15+2)
2	17	(Indonesia) Rio Haryanto	Barwa Addax Team	21	+6.513	2	12
3	3	(United Kingdom) James Calado	ART Grand Prix	21	+7.922	9	10
4	7	(Colombia) Julián Leal	Racing Engineering	21	+8.420	1	8
5	11	(United Kingdom) Sam Bird	Russian Time	21	+9.348	8	6
6	12	(France) Tom Dillmann	Russian Time	21	+14.563	6	4
7	9	(Brazil) Felipe Nasr	Carlin	21	+14.671	25	2
8	1	(Sweden) Marcus Ericsson	DAMS	21	+15.321	11	1
9	15	(United States) Alexander Rossi	EQ8 Caterham Racing	21	+15.877	10	
10	18	(Monaco) Stefano Coletti	Rapax	21	+18.789	21	
11	26	(United Kingdom) Adrian Quaife-Hobbs	MP Motorsport	21	+23.855	12	
12	21	(Italy) Kevin Ceccon	Trident Racing	21	+32.021	26	
13	24	(Austria) René Binder	Venezuela GP Lazarus	21	+34.933	16	
14	6	(New Zealand) Mitch Evans	Arden International	21	+35.673	19	
15	8	(Switzerland) Fabio Leimer	Racing Engineering	21	+35.861	5	
16	19	(Switzerland) Simon Trummer	Rapax	21	+37.838	24	
17	25	(Italy) Fabrizio Crestani	Venezuela GP Lazarus	21	+41.133	18	
18	27	(Netherlands) Daniël de Jong	MP Motorsport	21	+51.728	22	
19	2	(Monaco) Stéphane Richelmi	DAMS	21	+1:25.181	7	
20	14	(Spain) Sergio Canamasas	EQ8 Caterham Racing	20	+1 lap	23	
21	16	(United States) Jake Rosenzweig	Barwa Addax Team	19	+2 laps	14	
Ret	10	(United Kingdom) Jolyon Palmer	Carlin	13	Retired	3	
Ret	5	(Venezuela) Johnny Cecotto Jr.	Arden International	8	Retired	17	
Ret	22	(Netherlands) Robin Frijns	Hilmer Motorsport	6	Retired	13	
Ret	20	(France) Nathanaël Berthon	Trident Racing	3	Retired	20	
Ret	4	(Germany) Daniel Abt	ART Grand Prix	2	Retired	15	
Fastest lap: Jon Lancaster (Hilmer Motorsport) — 1:43.047 (on lap 6)

== See also ==
- 2013 British Grand Prix
- 2013 Silverstone GP3 Series round

== Notes ==
Previous round: 2013 Monaco GP2 Series round	GP2 Series; 2013 season	Next round: 2013 Nürburgring GP2 Series round
Previous round: 2012 Silverstone GP2 Series round	Silverstone GP2 round	Next round: 2014 Silverstone GP2 Series round
