= 2013 Monaco GP2 Series round =

Motor race

2013 Monaco GP2 round
Round details
- Round 4 of 11 rounds in the 2013 GP2 Series
- Circuit de Monaco
- Location: Circuit de Monaco, Monte Carlo, Monaco
- Course: Street circuit 3.340 km (2.075 mi)

GP2 Series

Feature race
- Date: 24 May 2013
- Laps: 42

Pole position
Driver	(Venezuela) Johnny Cecotto Jr.	Arden International
- Time: 1:21.195

Podium
First	(United Kingdom) Sam Bird	Russian Time
Second	(Italy) Kevin Ceccon	Trident Racing
Third	(New Zealand) Mitch Evans	Arden International

Fastest lap
Driver	(Monaco) Stefano Coletti	Rapax
- Time: 1:23.665 (on lap 9)

Sprint race
- Date: 25 May 2013
- Laps: 30

Podium
First	(Monaco) Stefano Coletti	Rapax
Second	(United Kingdom) Adrian Quaife-Hobbs	MP Motorsport
Third	(New Zealand) Mitch Evans	Arden International

Fastest lap
Driver	(Monaco) Stefano Coletti	Rapax
- Time: 1:22.853 (on lap 8)

The 2013 Monaco GP2 Series round was a pair of motor races held on 24 and 25 May 2013, at the Circuit de Monaco, Monte Carlo, Monaco as part of the GP2 Series. It was the fourth round of the 2013 GP2 Series and was run in support of the 2013 Monaco Grand Prix. The first race, a 42-lap feature event, was won by Russian Time driver Sam Bird who started from third position. Kevin Ceccon finished second for the Trident Racing team and Arden International driver Mitch Evans took third. Stefano Coletti of the Rapax team won the shorter 30-lap sprint race from MP Motorsport's Adrian Quaife-Hobbs in second and Evans third.

Johnny Cecotto Jr. won the pole position for the feature race by setting the fastest lap in qualifying. His lost the lead to teammate Evans heading into the first corner and understeered into the barrier while holding off Fabio Leimer. Jolyon Palmer spun in avoidance blocking passage to the turn and the race was stopped because 15 cars were stranded. Evans led the restarted race but Bird passed him after the pit stop phase. Bird opened up a lengthy advantage over the rest of the field to win. Quaife-Hobbs started from pole position in the sprint race and kept the lead until Coletti passed him on the third lap. Although his lead diminished because of tyre wear Coletti led the event's remaining laps to claim the victory.

Bird's feature race victory was his—and Russian Time's—second of the season and Coletti's sprint race win meant he became the first Monegasque driver to win on the streets of Monaco since Louis Chiron in 1931. The race results increased Coletti's Drivers' Championship lead to 24 points over Felipe Nasr. Bird's feature race win gained him two positions to move to third while Leimer fell to fourth. Rapax took the Teams' Championship lead from Carlin and Russian Time moved to third with Racing Engineering fourth with seven rounds left in the season.

== Background ==
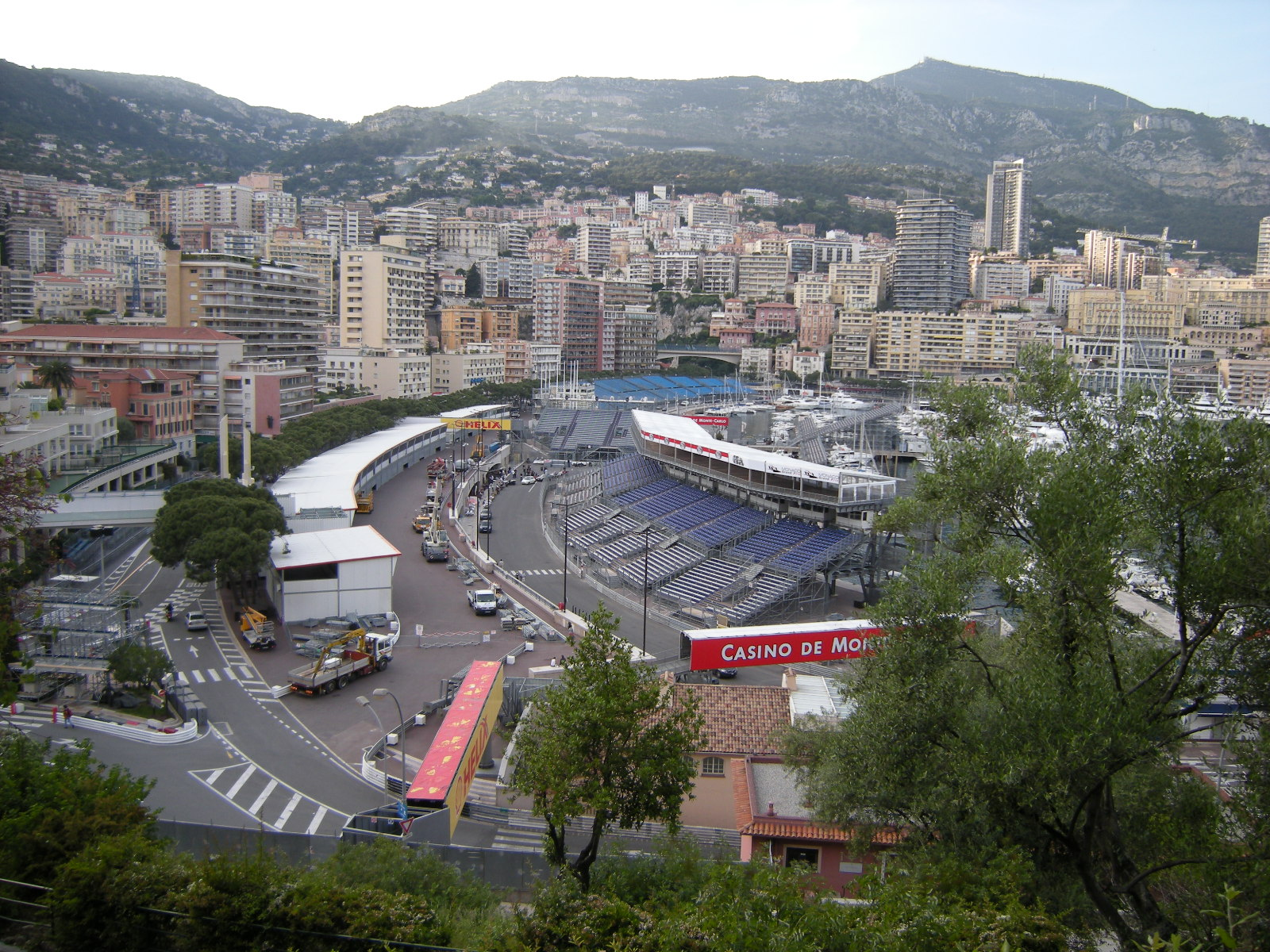
Circuit de Monaco, where the race was held.

The 2013 Monaco GP2 Series round was the fourth of eleven scheduled events in 2013. It was held on 24 and 25 May at the Circuit de Monaco in Monte Carlo and supported the 2013 Monaco Grand Prix. Tyre supplier Pirelli brought the red-banded supersoft and yellow-banded soft dry tyres to the race.

Before the two races, Rapax driver Stefano Coletti led the Drivers' Championship with 93 points, 17 ahead of Felipe Nasr in second, who in turn, was a further 18 points in front of Fabio Leimer in third. Robin Frijns was fourth on 33 points and Sam Bird was four points behind him in fifth place. Carlin led the Teams' Championship on 107 points; Rapax had a small deficit of six points in second and Racing Engineering were third with 64 points. Hilmer Motorsports were fourth on 56 points and Russian Time were one point in fifth.

For the round, there were 26 drivers were entered and all of them piloted the Dallara GP2/11 car fielded by 13 teams of two competitors each. After a strong start to the season, Frijns confirmed on Twitter that he would contest the Monaco round as his contract with Hilmer Motorsports was on a race-by-race basis.

== Practice and qualifying ==
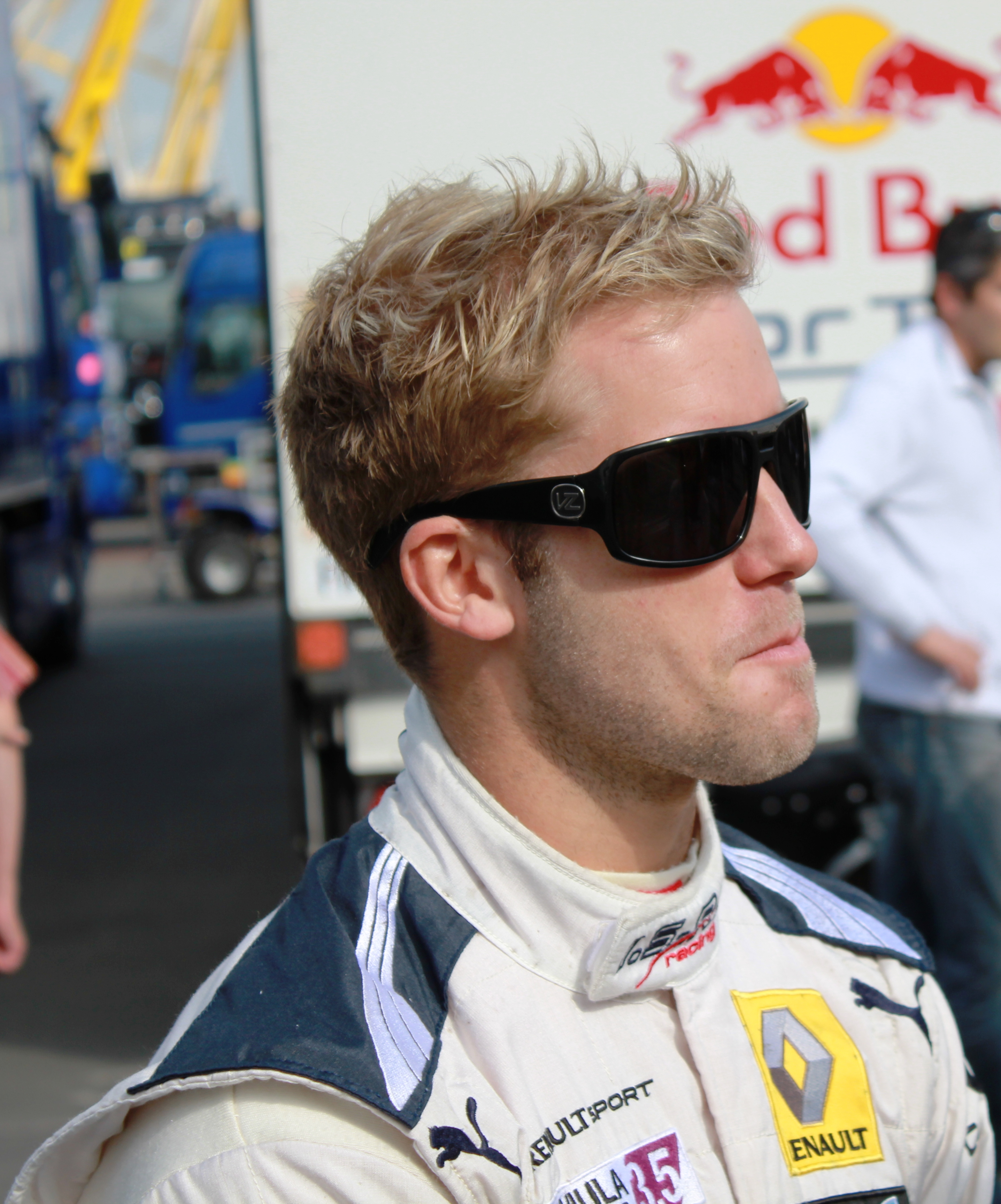
Sam Bird (pictured in 2012) set the fastest lap in practice and qualified in third position before going on to win the feature race.

One 30-minute practice session was held on Thursday before the two races. Bird, who called the Circuit de Monaco his favourite track in the GP2 Series, lapped fastest at 1:21.512 on super-soft tyres, 0.057 seconds faster than Russian Time teammate Tom Dillmann in second. Mitch Evans, Carlin's Jolyon Palmer, Marcus Ericsson of DAMS, Arden International's Johnny Cecotto Jr., Leimer, Nasr, Rio Haryanto of Addax and James Calado made up positions two to ten. Only minor off-track excursions were reported with DAMS's Stéphane Richelmi spinning at La Rascasse corner and stalled in his attempt to continue driving. Nasr narrowly avoided hitting the barrier at the Swimming Pool complex and Coletti, Leimer, Calado and Kevin Giovesi for Lazarus all ran deep onto the run-off areas at various points during practice.

Friday afternoon's qualifying session ran for 30-minutes. As in 2012, qualifying was divided into two groups of 13 cars, with odd numbered vehicles in Group A and even numbered cars in Group B. The starting order was determined by the fastest overall driver in either group. Most cars had the soft types equipped at the start and most made pit stops for set-up alterations with some installing supersoft tyres. Cecotto clinched his first pole position of the season, the second of his career, and at Monte Carlo with a time of 1:21.141. He was joined on the grid's front row by teammate Evans who led Group B; his best time was 0.016 seconds slower than Cecotto. On his final timed lap, Bird was fastest in the first 1/3 of the lap, but lost six tenths in the final 2/3 and was third. Leimer drifted sideways at the final corner on his fastest lap but avoided hitting the barrier en route to fourth. Kevin Ceccon (Trident) took fifth. Sixth-placed Palmer's first attempt at going faster proved unsuccessful as he encountered Richelmi in the final sector but took it at his next attempt before Leimer demoted him down the order.

Julián Leal (Racing Engineering) took seventh after encountering traffic on his final lap and needed to pass one car to record his fastest time. Dillmann qualified in eighth place. Nasr set the early pace in Group B before settling for ninth and Frijns took tenth. Ericsson in 11th was the fastest driver not to qualify in the top ten. He led Group B early on but was demoted as the session progressed. He was followed by Sergio Canamasas (Caterham Racing) in 12th and Rossi in 13th. Coletti was another Group B early pace setter but began from 14th position. Haryanto qualified in 15th but was demoted ten places on the grid for causing an avoidable accident at the season's previous round in Catalunya. Hence Nathanaël Berthon (Trident) inherited the place and was followed by Calado, Richelmi and Daniël de Jong (MP Motorsport). 20th place qualifier René Binder (Lazarus) incurred a three-place grid penalty for impeding Canamasas during qualifying. Giovesi began in 20th with Daniel Abt (ART Grand Prix), Simon Trummer (Rapax) and Jake Rosenzweig (Addax) in 21st to 23rd positions. Lancaster started from 24th after a spin at Sainte Dévote turn necessitated yellow flags to be waved in the area. The final position in the field was taken by Adrian Quaife-Hobbs (MP Motorsport) whose fastest time was 2.2 seconds slower than Cecotto.

=== Qualifying classification ===
==== Group A ====
Pos.	No.	Driver	Team	Time	Grid
1	5	(Venezuela) Johnny Cecotto Jr.	Arden International	1:21.141	1
2	11	(United Kingdom) Sam Bird	Russian Time	1:21.509	3
3	21	(Italy) Kevin Ceccon	Trident Racing	1:21.986	5
4	7	(Colombia) Julián Leal	Racing Engineering	1:22.092	7
5	9	(Brazil) Felipe Nasr	Carlin	1:22.163	9
6	1	(Sweden) Marcus Ericsson	DAMS	1:22.349	11
7	15	(United States) Alexander Rossi	Caterham Racing	1:22.511	13
8	17	(Indonesia) Rio Haryanto	Barwa Addax Team	1:22.589	25^{1}
9	3	(United Kingdom) James Calado	ART Grand Prix	1:22.677	16
10	27	(Netherlands) Daniël de Jong	MP Motorsport	1:22.943	18
11	25	(Italy) Kevin Giovesi	Venezuela GP Lazarus	1:23.006	19
12	19	(Switzerland) Simon Trummer	Rapax	1:23.017	21
13	23	(United Kingdom) Jon Lancaster	Hilmer Motorsport	1:23.443	24

==== Group B ====
Pos.	No.	Driver	Team	Time	Grid
1	6	(New Zealand) Mitch Evans	Arden International	1:21.157	2
2	8	(Switzerland) Fabio Leimer	Racing Engineering	1:21.185	4
3	10	(United Kingdom) Jolyon Palmer	Carlin	1:21.198	6
4	12	(France) Tom Dillmann	Russian Time	1:21.387	8
5	22	(Netherlands) Robin Frijns	Hilmer Motorsport	1:21.418	10
6	14	(Spain) Sergio Canamasas	Caterham Racing	1:21.522	12
7	18	(Monaco) Stefano Coletti	Rapax	1:21.658	14
8	20	(France) Nathanaël Berthon	Trident Racing	1:22.245	15
9	2	(Monaco) Stéphane Richelmi	DAMS	1:22.317	17
10	24	(Austria) René Binder	Venezuela GP Lazarus	1:22.376	22^{2}
11	4	(Germany) Daniel Abt	ART Grand Prix	1:22.716	20
12	16	(United States) Jake Rosenzweig	Barwa Addax Team	1:22.842	23
13	26	(United Kingdom) Adrian Quaife-Hobbs	MP Motorsport	1:23.328	26

Notes:

- ^1 — Rio Haryanto received a ten-place grid penalty for causing a collision at the previous race.
- ^2 — René Binder was penalised three places for impeding Canamasas during qualifying.

== Races ==
The first race was held over 140 km (87 mi) or 60 minutes (whichever came first) and the regulations required drivers to make one pit stop. The first ten finishers scored points, with two given to the fastest lap holder. The grid for the second race was determined by the finishing order of the first but with the first eight drivers in reverse order of where they finished. It was run for 100 km (62 mi) or 45 minutes (whichever came first). In contrast to the prior race drivers were not required to make pit stops. The top eight finishers earned points towards their respective championships.

=== Feature race ===
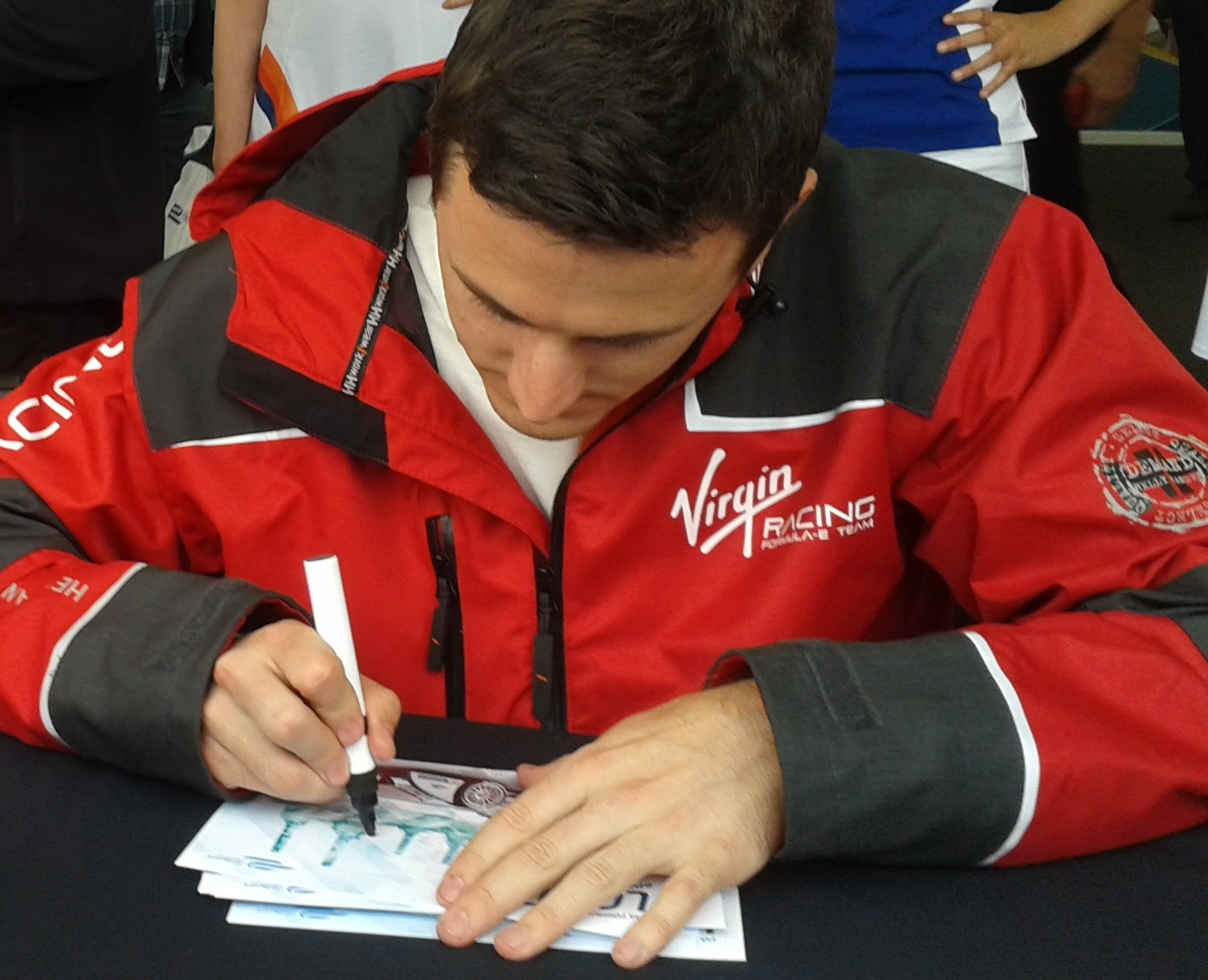
Fabio Leimer (pictured in 2015) was caught up in a first lap accident triggered by Johnny Cecotto Jr.

The feature race was due to start at 11:15 Central European Summer Time (UTC+02:00) on 24 May, but was delayed by 15 minutes due to an incident during qualifying for the Porsche Supercup race in which several cars crashed at Massenet corner. Repairs were required to the barriers at the turn as they had been dislodged, and oil laid on the track surface at the same turn was covered with cement dust. When the race began under overcast and cool weather of 18 °C (64 °F) and a track temperature of 26 °C (79 °F), wheelspin from Cecotto and a slow reaction from him allowed his teammate Evans to lead the field into Sainte Dévote turn. Soon after a 15-car crashed at the first corner forced a stoppage. After losing the lead Cecotto was holding off Leimer through Sainte Dévote, it became impossible for Cecotto to maintain his line and he understeered straight into the barrier. Leimer was trapped and mounted the left-hand corner of Cecotto's car. Palmer took avoiding action by spinning on the inside, blocking the turn. Palmer avoided injury when Leal's front wing almost struck his helmet.

Coletti, Leal, Dillmann, Frijns, Ericsson, Rossi, Berthon, Binder, Giovesi, Haryanto, Rosenzweig and Abt were all trapped in the blockade with varying degrees of car damage. Nasr was near Bird and Ceccon and avoided the collision between Leal and Palmer. Drivers ran back to their cars and remonstrated with marshals to allow them to take the restart. A 40-minute delay was necessitated for track clearing before the race could be restarted. Nine drivers had enough damage to warrant their retirement: Cecotto, Leimer, Palmer, Leal, Frijns, Ericsson, Rossi, Berthon and Giovesi. The running order was determined by where the drivers were in the first sector with others assigned their starting positions. This gave Evans the lead behind the safety car followed by Bird, Ceccon, Nasr, Calado, Richelmi, Lancaster and Quaife-Hobbs. The safety car was withdrawn at the end of lap two and racing resumed. Evans and Bird opened up a two-second lead over Ceccon, Nasr, Calado and Richelmi. Although Evans had switched to the supersoft tyres during the stoppage Bird set consecutive fastest laps on the soft tyres.

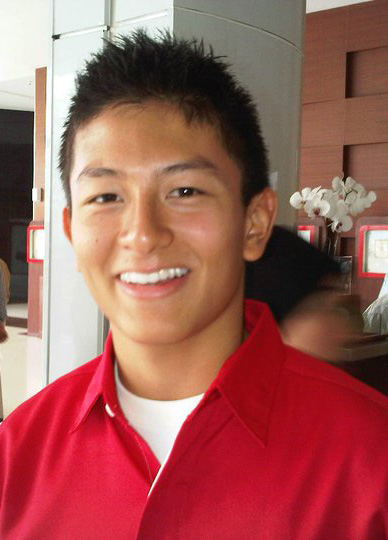
Rio Haryanto (pictured in 2011) was forced into retirement after Daniel Abt punted him into a barrier.

As they had been compromised by the first lap pileup and were at the back of the field, Dillmann and Coletti chose to make their mandatory pit stops when the window opened at the end of lap seven for rear soft compound tyres. Haryanto and Abt made their stops on the next lap and Calado and Lancaster followed on lap nine. Coletti's early pit stop caused him to lap faster than other drivers by two seconds. Other drivers became aware of the significance and Nasr entered the pit lane to keep his position from Calado. Ceccon and Richelmi did the same on the 11th lap, putting pressure on race leader Evans who was at this point three seconds a lap slower than Ceccon. Evans made his own pit stop on lap 12 for soft compound tyres but lost the lead to Ceccon, who made up enough time to pass him. Evans could not keep close to Ceccon and was three seconds behind after one lap and his diminishing pace hurt the delayed Bird who became the leader following Evans' pit stop. On lap 15, De Jong made a problematic pit stop: a rear jack failure delayed him and he crossed the yellow line at the pit lane exit twice, incurring a drive-through penalty.

Bird set fast laps and maintained the lead after his pit stop at the conclusion of the 16th lap ahead of the yet-to-stop Binder, Ceccon and Evans. Bird was pushing when he slid clipping a kerb on his first lap after leaving the pit lane and glanced a barrier leaving Portier turn on lap 18. Abt went to the outside of Haryanto on lap 28 and braked later than him for 13th. The resulting manoeuvre meant Abt put Haryanto into an inside barrier and damaging his car's nose cone. The need for the safety car was avoided as Haryanto's car was moved away from the track quickly. The stewards deemed Abt too aggressive towards Haryanto and imposed a drive-through penalty on him showed him a black flag with an orange disc to instruct him to repair his car. Dillmann attempted to pass Rosenzweig but ran deep at the Novelle Chicane, requiring him to relinquish the position to Rosenzweig. Binder made his pit stop on the 29th lap and emerged in seventh behind Coletti. Bird continued to lead by 17 seconds over Ceccon who held off the faster Evans in third who himself had Nasr and Calado close behind.

Bird then opened up a 22 second lead over the rest of the field and maintained it to win the race. Ceccon secured a series best finish of second with a second covering Evans in third and Nasr in fourth; Evans narrowly held off Nasr for the final podium place. Calado secured fifth with Coletti and Binder sixth and seventh. Quaife-Hobbs passed Richemi for eighth on the final lap for the sprint race pole position. Richelmi and De Jong were ninth and tenth. Dillmann, Lancaster, Trummer, Rosenzweig, Canamasas and Abt were the final classified finishers. It was Bird's third GP2 Series win, his second of 2013 for Russian Time, and repeated his 2012 Formula Renault 3.5 Series win in Monaco. After the race, the stewards deemed Cecotto responsible for causing the first lap stoppage and barred him from competing in the following day's sprint race.

=== Feature race classification ===
Drivers who scored championship points are denoted in bold.

Pos.	No.	Driver	Team	Laps	Time/Retired	Grid	Points
1	11	(United Kingdom) **Sam Bird**	**Russian Time**	42	1:36:15.919	3	25
2	21	(Italy) **Kevin Ceccon**	**Trident Racing**	42	+22.077	5	18
3	6	(New Zealand) **Mitch Evans**	**Arden International**	42	+23.225	2	15
4	9	(Brazil) **Felipe Nasr**	**Carlin**	42	+23.416	9	12
5	3	(United Kingdom) **James Calado**	**ART Grand Prix**	42	+29.588	16	10
6	18	(Monaco) **Stefano Coletti**	**Rapax**	42	+1:00.519	14	10 (8+2)
7	24	(Austria) **René Binder**	**Venezuela GP Lazarus**	42	+1:02.449	22	6
8	26	(United Kingdom) **Adrian Quaife-Hobbs**	**MP Motorsport**	42	+1:08.400	26	4
9	2	(Monaco) **Stéphane Richelmi**	**DAMS**	42	+1:12.107	17	2
10	27	(Netherlands) **Daniël de Jong**	**MP Motorsport**	42	+1:22.410	18	1
11	12	(France) Tom Dillmann	Russian Time	42	+1:29.356	8	
12	23	(United Kingdom) Jon Lancaster	Hilmer Motorsport	41	+1 lap	24	
13	19	(Switzerland) Simon Trummer	Rapax	41	+1 lap	21	
14	16	(United States) Jake Rosenzweig	Barwa Addax Team	41	+1 lap	23	
15	14	(Spain) Sergio Canamasas	Caterham Racing	40	+2 laps	12	
16	4	(Germany) Daniel Abt	ART Grand Prix	40	+2 laps	20	
Ret	17	(Indonesia) Rio Haryanto	Barwa Addax Team	26	Accident	25	
Ret	5	(Venezuela) Johnny Cecotto Jr.	Arden International	0	Accident	1	
Ret	8	(Switzerland) Fabio Leimer	Racing Engineering	0	Accident	4	
Ret	10	(United Kingdom) Jolyon Palmer	Carlin	0	Accident	6	
Ret	7	(Colombia) Julián Leal	Racing Engineering	0	Accident	7	
Ret	22	(Netherlands) Robin Frijns	Hilmer Motorsport	0	Accident	10	
Ret	1	(Sweden) Marcus Ericsson	DAMS	0	Accident	11	
Ret	15	(United States) Alexander Rossi	Caterham Racing	0	Accident	13	
Ret	20	(France) Nathanaël Berthon	Trident Racing	0	Accident	15	
Ret	25	(Italy) Kevin Giovesi	Venezuela GP Lazarus	0	Accident	19	
Fastest lap: Stefano Coletti (Rapax) — 1:23.665 (on lap 9)

=== Sprint race ===
The second race began at 16:10 local time on 25 May. The weather at the start were cooler than the previous day's race with light rain falling. The air temperature was 17 °C (63 °F) and the track temperature was 25 °C (77 °F). Most cars started on the soft compound tyres. When the race started, pole sitter Quaife-Hobbs made a good start to maintain the lead into Sainte Dévote corner while Coletti moved into second as Binder made a slow start and fell to sixth. Calado initially held third, but Evans overtook him on the outside at Mirabeau turn for third. Nasr passed Calado at the start of the following lap at Sainte Dévote corner for fourth position. Having been close behind Quaife-Hobbs in the race's opening stages, Coletti pressured him by using his local knowledge to apply pressure on the latter. Coletti lined up an overtake on Quaife-Hobbs on the third lap leaving the tunnel and into the Novelle Chicane. He steered right onto the inside and braked later than Quaife-Hobbs to pass him for the lead. Coletti began to pull away from Quaife-Hobbs, setting the race's fastest lap at that point on the fourth lap to be 2.1 seconds ahead.

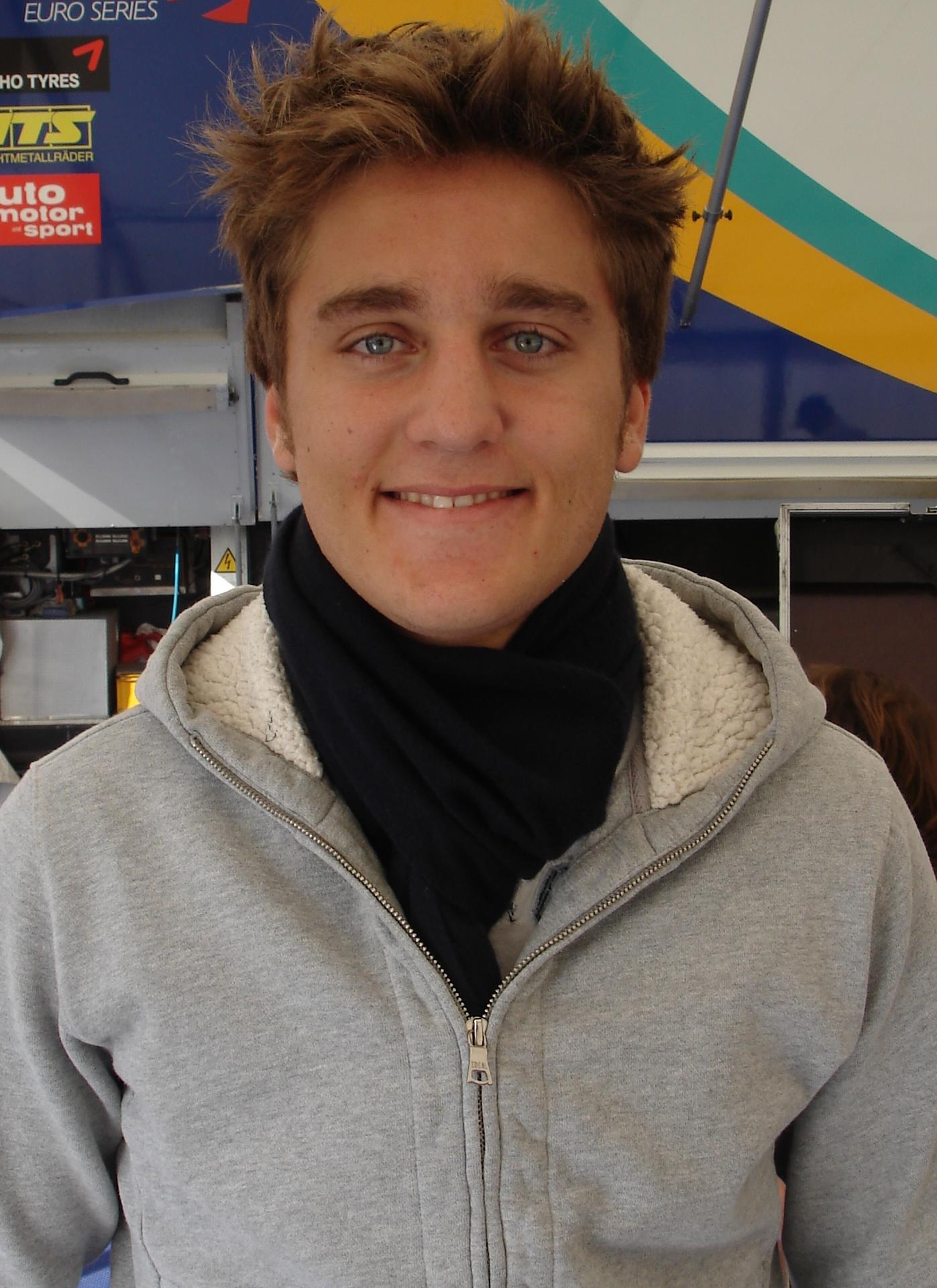
Stefano Coletti (pictured in 2010) became the first Monegasque driver to win a race in Monaco since Louis Chiron in 1931.

Quaife-Hobbs focused himself on holding off the closing Evans, Nasr and Calado. Dillmann was forced to go two laps behind the leader on the seventh lap after he sustained car damage. Bird in seventh was challenged by Ceccon entering the Novelle Chicane forcing Bird to overshoot the corner to avoid a collision. Bird was aware that his move would entail a drive-through penalty and yielded seventh to Ceccon. Richelmi immediately attacked Bird but it became evident that Bird's car had a major problem. Bird lost further positions before entering the pit lane for technical assistance that put him one lap behind the race leader. He thus set the race's fastest lap on supersoft tyres; as he was outside the top ten he did not score the point entailed by the achievement. Palmer overtook Canamasas on lap 13 in a near-identical move to Abt's pass on Haryanto in the previous day's race. But on this occasion, both drivers continued without significant damage. Quaife-Hobbs held off the three-car train and appeared stronger as the race progressed and the tyres degraded.

As the field became tightly packed, no driver had the advantage of getting the edge for moving up the field. This was the case until Rosenzweig stuck the front of his car down the inside of Lancaster through the Lowe's hairpin and tapped him into a half-spin. Rosenzweig moved into tenth as Lancaster could not recover sufficiently from the incident and lost five places in two corners. Coletti's hold on first waned because tyre degradation removed some of his earlier speed and handling, lowering his lead over Quaife-Hobbs to a second. Less than four seconds covered the first five with a 14-second gap over a battle for sixth between Binder, Ceccon and Richelmi. Coletti had help from Quaife-Hobbs who defended from Evans. By this point, the track was completely dry with no rainfall. Evans tried again to take second on the final lap, almost hitting the rear of Quaife-Hobbs's car as the pair left the Novelle Chicane. Coletti maintained the lead for the rest of the race to win, making him the first Monegasque driver to win on the streets of Monaco since Louis Chiron in the 1931 Monaco Grand Prix. Although he lost grip in his tyres, Quaife-Hobbs finished in second position, three-tenths of a second ahead of Evans in third after holding off Evans. Nasr, Calado, Binder, Ceccon and Richelmi made up positions four through ten. De Jong, Rosenzweig, Canamasas, Palmer, Leimer, Leal, Frijns, Haryanto, Lancaster, Ericcson, Rossi, Giovesi, Berthon, Abt, Trummer, Bird and Dillmann were the final classified finishers.

=== Sprint race classification ===
Drivers who scored championship points are denoted in bold.

Pos.	No.	Driver	Team	Laps	Time/Retired	Grid	Points
1	18	(Monaco) **Stefano Coletti**	**Rapax**	30	42.50.707	3	17 (15+2)
2	26	(United Kingdom) **Adrian Quaife-Hobbs**	**MP Motorsport**	30	+1.869	1	12
3	6	(New Zealand) **Mitch Evans**	**Arden International**	30	+2.218	6	10
4	9	(Brazil) **Felipe Nasr**	**Carlin**	30	+2.536	5	8
5	3	(United Kingdom) **James Calado**	**ART Grand Prix**	30	+3.747	4	6
6	24	(Austria) **René Binder**	**Venezuela GP Lazarus**	30	+19.293	2	4
7	21	(Italy) **Kevin Ceccon**	**Trident Racing**	30	+20.015	7	2
8	2	(Monaco) **Stéphane Richelmi**	**DAMS**	30	+20.576	9	1
9	27	(Netherlands) Daniël de Jong	MP Motorsport	30	+21.197	10	
10	16	(United States) Jake Rosenzweig	Barwa Addax Team	30	+31.720	14	
11	14	(Spain) Sergio Canamasas	Caterham Racing	30	+34.105	15	
12	10	(United Kingdom) Jolyon Palmer	Carlin	30	+35.775	19	
13	8	(Switzerland) Fabio Leimer	Racing Engineering	30	+36.488	18	
14	7	(Colombia) Julián Leal	Racing Engineering	30	+36.913	20	
15	22	(Netherlands) Robin Frijns	Hilmer Motorsport	30	+42.125	21	
16	17	(Indonesia) Rio Haryanto	Barwa Addax Team	30	+43.235	17	
17	23	(United Kingdom) Jon Lancaster	Hilmer Motorsport	30	+1:03.893	12	
18	1	(Sweden) Marcus Ericsson	DAMS	30	+1:04.258	22	
19	15	(United States) Alexander Rossi	Caterham Racing	30	+1:04.735	23	
20	25	(Italy) Kevin Giovesi	Venezuela GP Lazarus	30	+1:05.044	25	
21	20	(France) Nathanaël Berthon	Trident Racing	30	+1:05.468	24	
22	4	(Germany) Daniel Abt	ART Grand Prix	30	+1:06.174	16	
23	19	(Switzerland) Simon Trummer	Rapax	30	+1:07.413	13	
24	11	(United Kingdom) Sam Bird	Russian Time	29	+1 lap	8	
25	12	(France) Tom Dillmann	Russian Time	27	+3 laps	11	
EX	5	(Venezuela) Johnny Cecotto Jr.	Arden International	—	Excluded^{3}	—	
Fastest lap: Stefano Coletti (Rapax) — 1:22.853 (on lap 8)

Notes:

- **^3** — Johnny Cecotto Jr. was excluded from the race for causing a pile-up at the beginning of the feature race.

== Post-race ==
The top three drivers in both races appeared on the podium to collect their trophies and spoke to the media in a later press conference. Although Bird spoke of his satisfaction of controlling the pace of the feature race, he believed he was fortunate because of a new rear wing after Ceccon hit his car at the first start, "It’s an amazing to be able to win my first GP2 race in Monaco. Maybe I should have done it already in the past in GP2, but it felt pretty right today." Ceccon stated he was "happy" to finish second and praised his team for a strategy that allowed him to pass Evans, "It’s my first GP2 podium and it’s two years in a row that I finish on the podium here since I finished third last year in GP3 here as well. Today, I finished in P2 in race 1. It’s good." When asked if he was disappointed to finish third, Evans replied yes as he struggled with grip on the supersoft compound tyres at the restart and was being pressured by Bird on the harder compounds. Evans spoke of his belief that had he overtaken Ceccon he could have had similar pace levels to Bird and felt the best possible result he could have achieved was second but said he would accept the result.

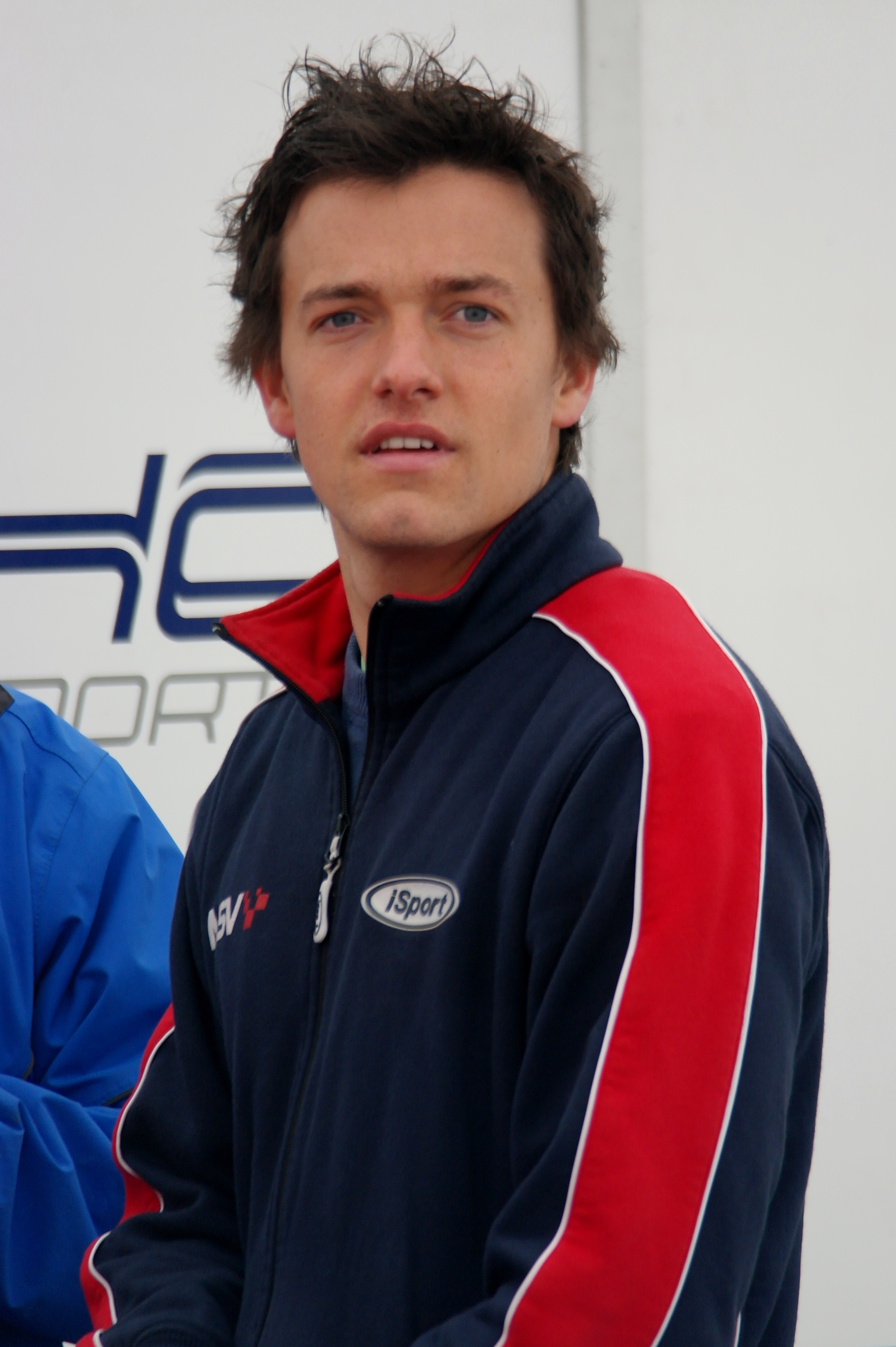
Jolyon Palmer (pictured in 2012), a vocal critic of Cecotto's driving in the feature race.

After the sprint race, Coletti spoke of his childhood dream of hearing the Monegasque national anthem while standing atop the podium, "It feels great I mean I’ve seen all the drivers winning here since I was a kid. I’m really, really happy especially that with this win I’ve consolidated my lead in the standings." He said for the season's next race at Silverstone his team need to improve his car for qualifying and then aim to win the feature race. Quaife-Hobbs said it felt "amazing" to achieve his first career podium, "Today, it’s a great reward for the team and how hard they’ve worked. We are a new team. Now every new team have had a podium." He believed had he defended from Coletti on the third lap both drivers would not have entered the Novelle Chicane and said he chose to follow Coletti with the view for an attack later on. Third-place finisher Evans revealed he struggled to get the optimum rear tyre temperature on the formation lap especially since the start was the best time to pass drivers and was aware that a podium finish was probably unrealistic. Nevertheless, he was happy to have finished on the podium again after altering his car.

Cecotto's driving in the feature race received much attention. It was third such incident in the season that Cecotto had courted controversy and criticism from drivers: he was disqualified from qualifying for the Sepang round when he forced Bird off the track but avoided a penalty in the Catalunya sprint race when he swerved across Canamasas in a battle for fifth. Leimer claimed that Cecotto solely concentrated on himself rather than making the corner, "It's really, really disappointing as a lot was possible today and I could have scored a lot of points. But once more due to another driver I lost out, while my competitors in the battle for the championship are scoring." Palmer was more vocal in his criticism in Cecotto, remarking he would rather start from the pit lane than within two rows of Cecotto. Peter Allen of Formula Scout argued that while Cecotto's manoeuvre was not clearly malicious in intent, the driver deserved the ban to help him realise he needed to control his aggression.

The result increased Coletti's lead atop of the Drivers' Championship with 120 points. Nasr remained in second place, 24 points behind Coletti, while Bird's feature race victory moved him to third position. Because he scored no points in both races, Leimer fell to fourth and Calado moved from eighth to fifth. Rapax took the lead of the Teams' Championship by one point ahead of previous leaders Carlin. Russian Time moved to third place on 80 points and were a further 16 ahead of fourth-placed Racing Engineering. Arden took over fifth place with seven rounds left in the season.

== Standings after the race ==
Drivers' Championship standings

+/–	Pos.	Driver	Points
	1	(Monaco) Stefano Coletti	120
	2	(Brazil) Felipe Nasr	96
2	3	(United Kingdom) Sam Bird	58
1	4	(Switzerland) Fabio Leimer	54
3	5	(United Kingdom) James Calado	40

Teams' Championship standings

+/–	Pos.	Team	Points
1	1	(Italy) Rapax	128
1	2	(United Kingdom) Carlin	127
2	3	(Russia) Russian Time	80
1	4	(Spain) Racing Engineering	64
1	5	(United Kingdom) Arden International	59

- Note: Only the top five positions are included for both sets of standings.

Previous round: 2013 Catalunya GP2 Series round	GP2 Series; 2013 season	Next round: 2013 Silverstone GP2 Series round
Previous round: 2012 Monaco GP2 Series round	Monaco GP2 round	Next round: 2014 Monaco GP2 Series round
