= 2013 GP2 Series =

Motorsport season

The 2013 GP2 Series season was the forty-seventh season of the second-tier of Formula One feeder championship and also ninth season under the GP2 Series moniker, a support series to the 2013 Formula One World Championship.

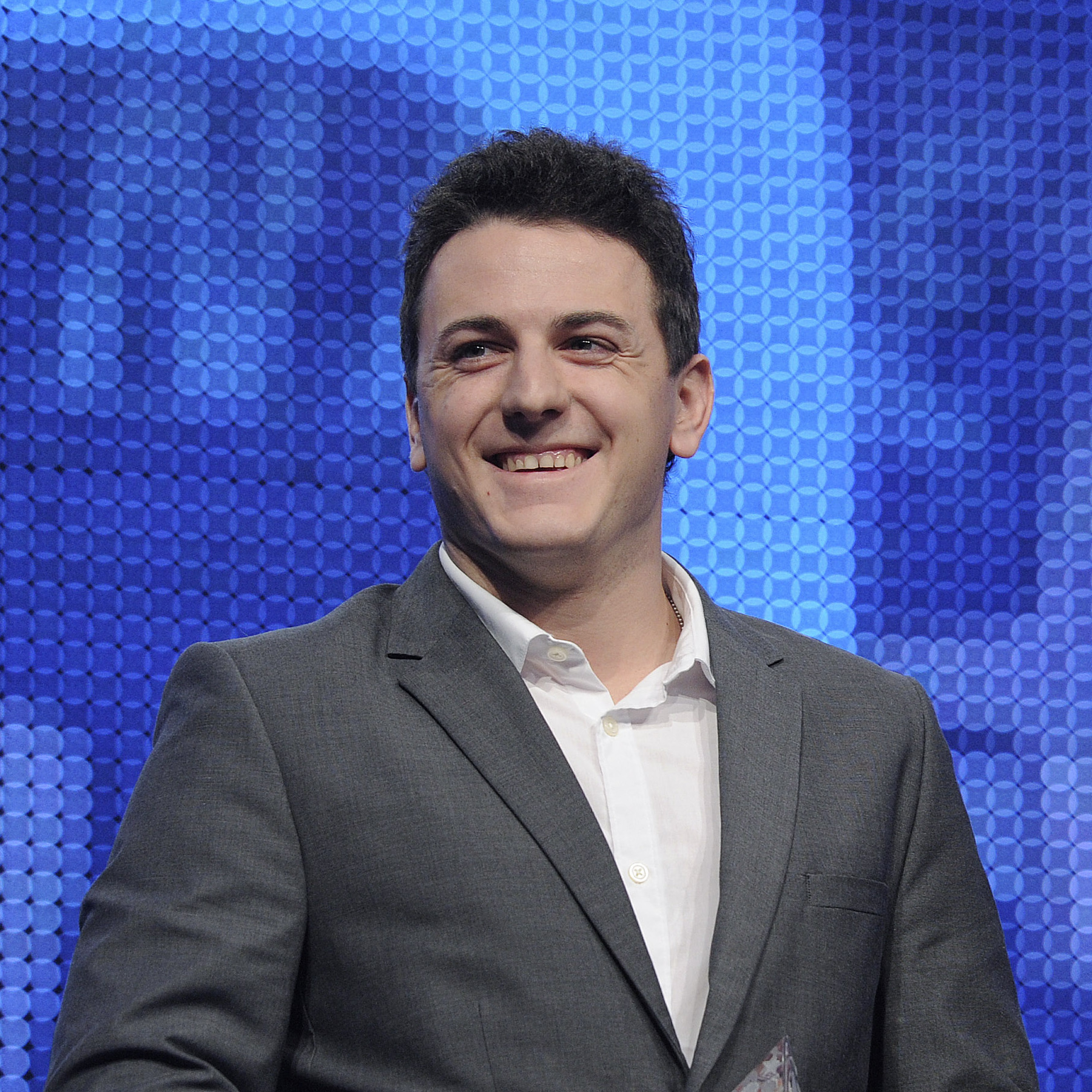
Fabio Leimer won the Drivers' Championship.

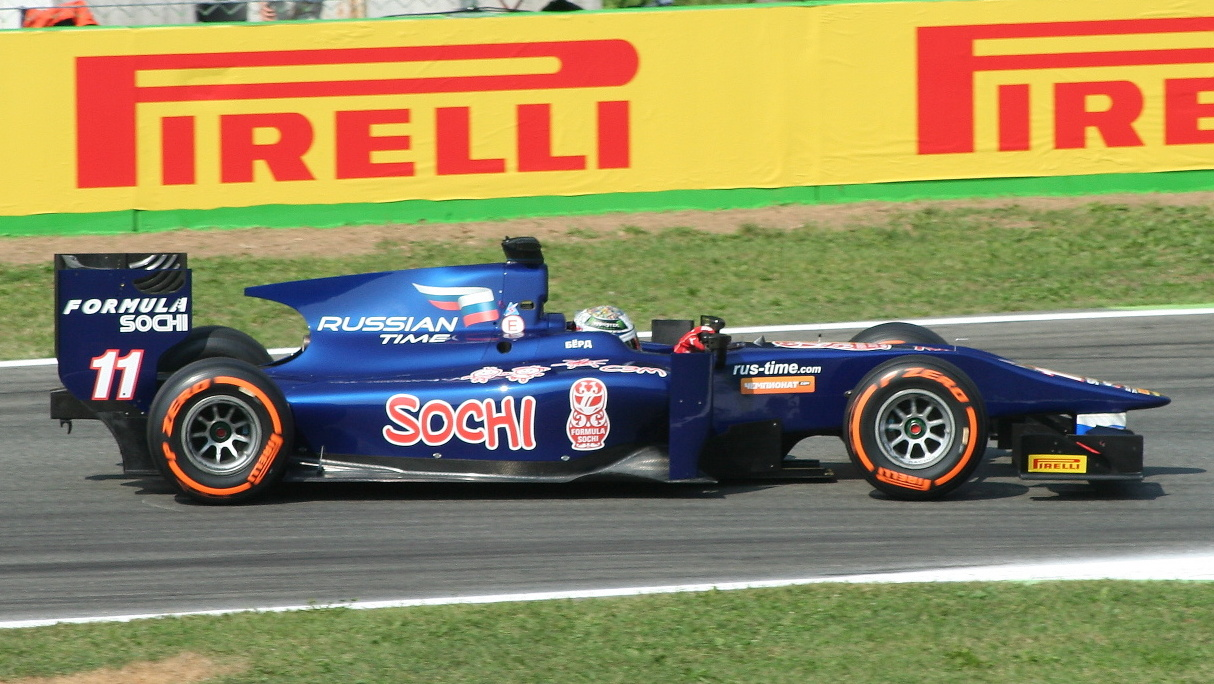
Russian Time won the Teams' Championship.

The 2013 season saw three new teams — Russian Time, Hilmer Motorsport and MP Motorsport — join the championship, replacing iSport International, Ocean Racing Technology and Scuderia Coloni. 2013 was scheduled to be the last season in which teams compete with the third-generation GP2 car — the Dallara GP2/11 — which was introduced in 2011, but series organisers decided to keep the GP2/11 for another three-year cycle in a bid to keep costs down. The season saw 10 different winners. Champion Fabio Leimer took 3 race wins, as runner-up Sam Bird took 5 victories, Jolyon Palmer took 2 race wins, as did Jon Lancaster. Stefano Coletti took 3 sprint race wins. Adrian Quaife-Hobbs, Nathanael Berthon, Marcus Ericsson and Alexander Rossi each took 1 race win, and ART Grand Prix driver James Calado took 2 race wins.

== Teams and drivers ==
Twenty-six drivers representing thirteen teams was scheduled to take part in the championship. The driver who is declared champion received a Formula One test with tyre supplier Pirelli as their prize, as well as qualifying for an FIA Superlicence.

Team	No.	Drivers	Rounds
(France) DAMS	1	(Sweden) Marcus Ericsson	All
(France) DAMS	2	(Monaco) Stéphane Richelmi	All
(France) ART Grand Prix	3	(United Kingdom) James Calado	All
(France) ART Grand Prix	4	(Germany) Daniel Abt	All
(United Kingdom) Arden International	5	(Venezuela) Johnny Cecotto Jr. (Note: Cecotto competed under a state Venezuelan racing licence.)	All
(United Kingdom) Arden International	6	(New Zealand) Mitch Evans	All
(Spain) Racing Engineering	7	(Colombia) Julián Leal	All
(Spain) Racing Engineering	8	(Switzerland) Fabio Leimer	All
(United Kingdom) Carlin	9	(Brazil) Felipe Nasr	All
(United Kingdom) Carlin	10	(United Kingdom) Jolyon Palmer	All
(Russia) Russian Time	11	(United Kingdom) Sam Bird	All
(Russia) Russian Time	12	(France) Tom Dillmann	All
(Malaysia) Caterham Racing (1–3) (Malaysia) EQ8 Caterham Racing (4–11)	14	(Spain) Sergio Canamasas	All
(Malaysia) Caterham Racing (1–3) (Malaysia) EQ8 Caterham Racing (4–11)	15	(China) Ma Qinghua	1
(Malaysia) Caterham Racing (1–3) (Malaysia) EQ8 Caterham Racing (4–11)	15	(United States) Alexander Rossi	2–11
(Spain) Barwa Addax Team	16	(United States) Jake Rosenzweig	All
(Spain) Barwa Addax Team	17	(Indonesia) Rio Haryanto	All
(Italy) Rapax	18	(Monaco) Stefano Coletti	All
(Italy) Rapax	19	(Switzerland) Simon Trummer	All
(Italy) Trident Racing	20	(France) Nathanaël Berthon	All
(Italy) Trident Racing	21	(Italy) Kevin Ceccon	1–6
(Italy) Trident Racing	21	(Portugal) Ricardo Teixeira	7–8
(Italy) Trident Racing	21	(Italy) Sergio Campana	9
(Italy) Trident Racing	21	(Canada) Gianmarco Raimondo	10–11
(Germany) Hilmer Motorsport	22	(United States) Conor Daly	1
(Germany) Hilmer Motorsport	22	(Netherlands) Robin Frijns	2–6
(Germany) Hilmer Motorsport	22	(United Kingdom) Adrian Quaife-Hobbs	7–11
(Germany) Hilmer Motorsport	23	(Norway) Pål Varhaug	1–2
(Germany) Hilmer Motorsport	23	(United Kingdom) Jon Lancaster	3–7, 9–11
(Germany) Hilmer Motorsport	23	(Netherlands) Robin Frijns	8
(Italy) Venezuela GP Lazarus (Note: Venezuela GP Lazarus competed under an Italian licence.)	24	(Austria) René Binder	All
(Italy) Venezuela GP Lazarus	25	(Italy) Kevin Giovesi	1–4
(Italy) Venezuela GP Lazarus	25	(Italy) Fabrizio Crestani	5–6
(Italy) Venezuela GP Lazarus	25	(Italy) Vittorio Ghirelli	7–11
(Netherlands) MP Motorsport	26	(United Kingdom) Adrian Quaife-Hobbs	1–6
(Netherlands) MP Motorsport	26	(Spain) Dani Clos	7–11
(Netherlands) MP Motorsport	27	(Netherlands) Daniël de Jong	All

=== Team changes ===
- After racing as «Lotus GP» in 2011 and 2012, ART Grand Prix reverted to using its original name in 2013.
- Scuderia Coloni did not participate in the 2013 season following what the team described as a "disagreement" between themselves and series organisers during the 2012 season. They were replaced by the Dutch team MP Motorsport.
- In February 2013, the owners of iSport International announced that the team had been put up for sale to avoid potential bankruptcy. The team was later purchased by Russian Time, a Russian entry based in Germany.
- Ocean Racing Technology withdrew from the GP2 Series (and sister series GP3) after encountering financial difficulty. They were replaced by Hilmer Motorsport, a team created by Franz Hilmer, whose company Formtech supplies several Formula One teams.

=== Driver changes ===
Entering/Re-entering GP2

- After finishing as runner-up in the 2012 GP3 Series with the Lotus GP team, Daniel Abt joined the team's GP2 squad, partnering James Calado.
- After one-year absence due to Formula Renault 3.5 campaign, Sam Bird returned to the series with Russian Time.
- Kevin Ceccon, who competed in the GP2 Series in 2011 with Scuderia Coloni, returned to GP2 with Trident Racing, having spent the 2012 season racing in GP3.
- GP3 Series driver Conor Daly made his debut with Hilmer Motorsport.
- 2012 GP3 Series champion Mitch Evans entered the GP2 Series with Arden International, the same team he won the GP3 title with.
- 2012 European F3 Open Copa Class champion Kevin Giovesi graduated to the GP2 Series with Venezuela GP Lazarus.
- Former HRT F1 test driver Ma Qinghua joined Caterham Racing after the collapse of HRT.
- 2012 Auto GP World Series champion Adrian Quaife-Hobbs made his step up to GP2 with MP Motorsport.
- Pål Varhaug returned to GP2 after placing second in the Auto GP World Series in 2012.

Leaving GP2

- Max Chilton left GP2 to race in Formula One with Marussia.
- Luca Filippi left the GP2 Series to compete in IndyCar with Barracuda Racing.
- Esteban Gutiérrez left GP2 to race in Formula One with Sauber alongside 2009 champion Nico Hülkenberg.
- Nigel Melker, who raced in 2012 with Ocean Racing Technology, moved to the Formula Renault 3.5 Series for the 2013 season.
- 2012 series runner-up Luiz Razia left Arden International to make his Formula One debut with Marussia. However, Razia lost his seat with the team less than a month later, and did not secure a seat in the GP2 Series.
- Davide Valsecchi, who won the 2012 championship with DAMS, left the series, as GP2 champions are not permitted to continue racing in the category. Valsecchi was later promoted to the role of test and reserve driver for Formula One team Lotus F1.
- Giedo van der Garde left the GP2 Series for Formula One, where he continued racing for Caterham.

Changed Teams

- Nathanaël Berthon left Racing Engineering after a single season. He later joined Trident Racing.
- Sergio Canamasas, who raced with Venezuela GP Lazarus in the second half of the 2012 season, joined Caterham Racing.
- Johnny Cecotto Jr. moved from Barwa Addax to Arden International.
- Daniël de Jong, who competed part-time with Rapax in 2012, joined MP Motorsport.
- Tom Dillmann, who also competed part-time with Rapax throughout the 2012 season, joined Russian Time.
- Marcus Ericsson left iSport International to join DAMS.
- Rio Haryanto, who drove for Carlin in 2012, moved to Barwa Addax for the 2013 season.
- Julián Leal switched to Racing Engineering after competing with Trident Racing during the 2012 season.
- Felipe Nasr, who drove for DAMS in 2012, moved to Carlin for the 2013 season.
- Jolyon Palmer switched from iSport International to Carlin.
- Stéphane Richelmi joined DAMS, after racing for Trident Racing in 2012.
- Ricardo Teixeira lost his seat at Rapax. He returned with Trident Racing for the Hungarian and Belgian rounds.
- Simon Trummer lost his seat at Arden International. He later moved to Rapax for the 2013 season.

==== Mid-season changes ====
- After the first round in Malaysia, Conor Daly was replaced by 2012 Formula Renault 3.5 Series champion Robin Frijns.
- Alexander Rossi replaced Ma Qinghua at Caterham Racing after the first round.
- Jon Lancaster replaced Pål Varhaug at Hilmer Motorsport after the second round.
- Fabrizio Crestani replaced Kevin Giovesi at Venezuela GP Lazarus ahead of the Silverstone round of the championship.
- Vittorio Ghirelli debuted in the series at the Hungaroring round replacing Crestani at Lazarus.
- Trident's driver Kevin Ceccon was replaced at the Hungarian round by Ricardo Teixeira.
- MP Motorsport driver Adrian Quaife-Hobbs moved teams to Hilmer at the Hungaroring, replacing Robin Frijns. Quaife-Hobbs was replaced at MP by series veteran Dani Clos.
- Frijns made a comeback replacing Lancaster at the Spa-Francorchamps event, before Lancaster returned at Monza.
- Auto GP World Series driver Sergio Campana was drafted in to replace Teixeira at Trident at Monza.
- Gianmarco Raimondo joined Trident ahead of the race in Singapore.

== 2013 schedule ==
The calendar for the 2013 series was unveiled on 19 December 2012. The season consisted of twenty-two races in support of eleven Formula One Grands Prix throughout the 2013 season.

Round		Circuit/Location	Country	Date	Supporting
1	F	Sepang International Circuit, Sepang	Malaysia	23 March	Malaysian Grand Prix
1	S	Sepang International Circuit, Sepang	Malaysia	24 March	Malaysian Grand Prix
2	F	Bahrain International Circuit, Sakhir	Bahrain	20 April	Bahrain Grand Prix
2	S	Bahrain International Circuit, Sakhir	Bahrain	21 April	Bahrain Grand Prix
3	F	Circuit de Catalunya, Montmeló	Spain	11 May	Spanish Grand Prix
3	S	Circuit de Catalunya, Montmeló	Spain	12 May	Spanish Grand Prix
4	F	Circuit de Monaco, Monaco	Monaco	24 May	Monaco Grand Prix
4	S	Circuit de Monaco, Monaco	Monaco	25 May	Monaco Grand Prix
5	F	Silverstone Circuit, Silverstone	United Kingdom	29 June	British Grand Prix
5	S	Silverstone Circuit, Silverstone	United Kingdom	30 June	British Grand Prix
6	F	Nürburgring, Nürburg	Germany	6 July	German Grand Prix
6	S	Nürburgring, Nürburg	Germany	7 July	German Grand Prix
7	F	Hungaroring, Mogyoród	Hungary	27 July	Hungarian Grand Prix
7	S	Hungaroring, Mogyoród	Hungary	28 July	Hungarian Grand Prix
8	F	Circuit de Spa-Francorchamps, Stavelot	Belgium	24 August	Belgian Grand Prix
8	S	Circuit de Spa-Francorchamps, Stavelot	Belgium	25 August	Belgian Grand Prix
9	F	Monza Circuit, Monza	Italy	7 September	Italian Grand Prix
9	S	Monza Circuit, Monza	Italy	8 September	Italian Grand Prix
10	F	Marina Bay Street Circuit, Singapore	Singapore	21 September	Singapore Grand Prix
10	S	Marina Bay Street Circuit, Singapore	Singapore	22 September	Singapore Grand Prix
11	F	Yas Marina Circuit, Abu Dhabi	United Arab Emirates	2 November	Abu Dhabi Grand Prix
11	S	Yas Marina Circuit, Abu Dhabi	United Arab Emirates	3 November	Abu Dhabi Grand Prix

=== Calendar changes ===
- The series only visited the Bahrain International Circuit once in 2013, in support of the 2013 Bahrain Grand Prix. The second, independent round—that was held one week after the 2012 Bahrain Grand Prix—was discontinued for 2013.
- The series did not visit the Valencia Street Circuit after the European Grand Prix was removed from the 2013 Formula One season calendar.
- The series returned to race the Yas Marina Circuit after the round was run as a non-championship race in 2011 and left off the 2012 calendar.
- German Grand Prix was moved from Hockenheim to Nürburgring.

== Results and standings ==
=== Summary ===
Round		Circuit	Pole position	Fastest lap	Winning driver	Winning team	Report
1	F	(Malaysia) Sepang International Circuit	(Monaco) Stefano Coletti	(United Kingdom) Sam Bird	(Switzerland) Fabio Leimer	(Spain) Racing Engineering	Report
1	S	(Malaysia) Sepang International Circuit		(France) Nathanaël Berthon (Note: Nathanaël Berthon set the fastest lap, but did not finish in the top 10, so was ineligible to be the point-scorer for the fastest lap. Stefano Coletti was the point-scorer instead for setting the fastest lap of those finishing in the top 10.)	(Monaco) Stefano Coletti	(Italy) Rapax	Report
2	F	Bahrain International Circuit	(Switzerland) Fabio Leimer	(Colombia) Julián Leal (Note: Julián Leal set the fastest lap, but did not finish in the top 10, so was ineligible to be the point-scorer for the fastest lap. Johnny Cecotto Jr. was the point-scorer instead for setting the fastest lap of those finishing in the top 10.)	(Switzerland) Fabio Leimer	(Spain) Racing Engineering	Report
2	S	Bahrain International Circuit		(France) Nathanaël Berthon (Note: Nathanaël Berthon set the fastest lap, but did not finish in the top 10, so was ineligible to be the point-scorer for the fastest lap. Sam Bird was the point-scorer instead for setting the fastest lap of those finishing in the top 10.)	(United Kingdom) Sam Bird	(Russia) Russian Time	Report
3	F	(Spain) Circuit de Catalunya	(Sweden) Marcus Ericsson	(Switzerland) Simon Trummer (Note: Simon Trummer set the fastest lap, but did not finish in the top 10, so was ineligible to be the point-scorer for the fastest lap. Jon Lancaster was the point-scorer instead for setting the fastest lap of those finishing in the top 10.)	(Netherlands) Robin Frijns	(Germany) Hilmer Motorsport	Report
3	S	(Spain) Circuit de Catalunya		(France) Tom Dillmann (Note: Tom Dillmann set the fastest lap, but did not finish in the top 10, so was ineligible to be the point-scorer for the fastest lap. Stefano Coletti was the point-scorer instead for setting the fastest lap of those finishing in the top 10.)	(Monaco) Stefano Coletti	(Italy) Rapax	Report
4	F	Circuit de Monaco	(Venezuela) Johnny Cecotto Jr.	(Spain) Sergio Canamasas (Note: Sergio Canamasas set the fastest lap, but did not finish in the top 10, so was ineligible to be the point-scorer for the fastest lap. Stefano Coletti was the point-scorer instead for setting the fastest lap of those finishing in the top 10.)	(United Kingdom) Sam Bird	(Russia) Russian Time	Report
4	S	Circuit de Monaco		(United Kingdom) Sam Bird (Note: Sam Bird set the fastest lap, but did not finish in the top 10, so was ineligible to be the point-scorer for the fastest lap. Stefano Coletti was the point-scorer instead for setting the fastest lap of those finishing in the top 10.)	(Monaco) Stefano Coletti	(Italy) Rapax	Report
5	F	(United Kingdom) Silverstone Circuit	(Sweden) Marcus Ericsson	(New Zealand) Mitch Evans (Note: Mitch Evans set the fastest lap, but did not finish in the top 10, so was ineligible to be the point-scorer for the fastest lap. Tom Dillmann was the point-scorer instead for setting the fastest lap of those finishing in the top 10.)	(United Kingdom) Sam Bird	(Russia) Russian Time	Report
5	S	(United Kingdom) Silverstone Circuit		(United Kingdom) Jon Lancaster	(United Kingdom) Jon Lancaster	(Germany) Hilmer Motorsport	Report
6	F	(Germany) Nürburgring	(Monaco) Stéphane Richelmi	(Colombia) Julián Leal (Note: Julián Leal set the fastest lap, but did not finish in the top 10, so was ineligible to be the point-scorer for the fastest lap. Marcus Ericsson was the point-scorer instead for setting the fastest lap of those finishing in the top 10.)	(Sweden) Marcus Ericsson	(France) DAMS	Report
6	S	(Germany) Nürburgring		(Italy) Fabrizio Crestani (Note: Fabrizio Crestani set the fastest lap, but did not finish in the top 10, so was ineligible to be the point-scorer for the fastest lap. James Calado was the point-scorer instead for setting the fastest lap of those finishing in the top 10.)	(United Kingdom) Jon Lancaster	(Germany) Hilmer Motorsport	Report
7	F	(Hungary) Hungaroring	(France) Tom Dillmann	(Monaco) Stefano Coletti (Note: Stefano Coletti set the fastest lap, but did not finish in the top 10, so was ineligible to be the point-scorer for the fastest lap. Marcus Ericsson was the point-scorer instead for setting the fastest lap of those finishing in the top 10.)	(United Kingdom) Jolyon Palmer	(United Kingdom) Carlin	Report
7	S	(Hungary) Hungaroring		(United Kingdom) Jon Lancaster (Note: Jon Lancaster set the fastest lap, but did not finish in the top 10, so was ineligible to be the point-scorer for the fastest lap. Nathanaël Berthon was the point-scorer instead for setting the fastest lap of those finishing in the top 10.)	(France) Nathanaël Berthon	(Italy) Trident Racing	Report
8	F	(Belgium) Circuit de Spa-Francorchamps	(United Kingdom) Sam Bird	(France) Tom Dillmann	(United Kingdom) Sam Bird	(Russia) Russian Time	Report
8	S	(Belgium) Circuit de Spa-Francorchamps		(United States) Alexander Rossi (Note: Alexander Rossi set the fastest lap, but did not finish in the top 10, so was ineligible to be the point-scorer for the fastest lap. James Calado was the point-scorer instead for setting the fastest lap of those finishing in the top 10.)	(United Kingdom) James Calado	(France) ART Grand Prix	Report
9	F	(Italy) Monza Circuit	(United Kingdom) Sam Bird	(United Kingdom) Sam Bird	(Switzerland) Fabio Leimer	(Spain) Racing Engineering	Report
9	S	(Italy) Monza Circuit		(Switzerland) Fabio Leimer	(United Kingdom) Adrian Quaife-Hobbs	(Germany) Hilmer Motorsport	Report
10	F	(Singapore) Marina Bay Street Circuit	(United Kingdom) Jolyon Palmer	(New Zealand) Mitch Evans (Note: Mitch Evans set the fastest lap, but did not finish in the top 10, so was ineligible to be the point-scorer for the fastest lap. Jolyon Palmer was the point-scorer instead for setting the fastest lap of those finishing in the top 10.)	(United Kingdom) Jolyon Palmer	(United Kingdom) Carlin	Report
10	S	(Singapore) Marina Bay Street Circuit		(United Kingdom) Jolyon Palmer (Note: Jolyon Palmer set the fastest lap, but did not finish in the top 10, so was ineligible to be the point-scorer for the fastest lap. Marcus Ericsson was the point-scorer instead for setting the fastest lap of those finishing in the top 10.)	(United Kingdom) Sam Bird	(Russia) Russian Time	Report
11	F	(United Arab Emirates) Yas Marina Circuit	(United States) Alexander Rossi (Note: Marcus Ericsson recorded the fastest time in qualifying for the race at Abu Dhabi, but his best time was deleted for exceeding track limits. Alexander Rossi was recognised as the pole-sitter for the race.)	(United Kingdom) Jolyon Palmer	(United States) Alexander Rossi	(Malaysia) EQ8 Caterham Racing	Report
11	S	(United Arab Emirates) Yas Marina Circuit		(Monaco) Stéphane Richelmi (Note: Stéphane Richelmi set the fastest lap, but did not finish in the top 10, so was ineligible to be the point-scorer for the fastest lap. Dani Clos was the point-scorer instead for setting the fastest lap of those finishing in the top 10.)	(United Kingdom) James Calado	(France) ART Grand Prix	Report

=== Drivers' championship ===
Scoring system

Points were awarded to the top 10 classified finishers in the Feature race, and to the top 8 classified finishers in the Sprint race. The pole-sitter in the feature race also received four points, and two points were given to the driver who set the fastest lap inside the top ten in both the feature and sprint races. No extra points were awarded to the pole-sitter in the sprint race.

Feature race points

Position	**1st**	**2nd**	**3rd**	**4th**	**5th**	**6th**	**7th**	**8th**	**9th**	**10th**	**Pole**	**FL**
Points	25	18	15	12	10	8	6	4	2	1	4	2

Sprint race points

Points were awarded to the top 8 classified finishers.

Position	**1st**	**2nd**	**3rd**	**4th**	**5th**	**6th**	**7th**	**8th**	**FL**
Points	15	12	10	8	6	4	2	1	2

Pos.	Driver	SEP (Malaysia)		BHR (Bahrain)		CAT (Spain)		MON (Monaco)		SIL (United Kingdom)		NÜR (Germany)		HUN (Hungary)		SPA (Belgium)		MNZ (Italy)		MRN (Singapore)		YMC (United Arab Emirates)		Points
1	(Switzerland) Fabio Leimer	1	12	**1**	9	18	9	Ret	13	4	15	4	3	4	3	4	5	1	6	5	3	4	3	201
2	(United Kingdom) Sam Bird	7	Ret	6	1	21†	12	1	24	1	5	13	8	10	8	**1**	14	**2**	4	8	1	10	4	181
3	(United Kingdom) James Calado	2	Ret	12	5	Ret	11	5	5	9	3	2	2	9	6	8	1	6	26	3	20	6	1	157
4	(Brazil) Felipe Nasr	4	2	4	2	2	3	4	4	Ret	7	9	4	3	5	Ret	8	Ret	12	2	16	7	18	154
5	(Monaco) Stefano Coletti	**3**	1	2	3	4	1	6	1	21†	10	3	19	16	20†	13	23	Ret	13	12	24	20†	9	135
6	(Sweden) Marcus Ericsson	Ret	13	13	Ret	**Ret**	20	Ret	18	**11**	8	1	13	2	4	2	15	Ret	23	7	2	3	6	121
7	(United Kingdom) Jolyon Palmer	6	9	5	6	10	4	Ret	12	6	Ret	24	11	1	12	15	6	Ret	10	**1**	17	2	Ret	119
8	(Monaco) Stéphane Richelmi	8	4	Ret	13	15	15	9	8	2	19	**5**	Ret	5	9	7	4	4	25	4	4	Ret	20	103
9	(United States) Alexander Rossi			3	20	6	6	Ret	19	10	9	11	6	13	16	3	22	8	2	Ret	23	**1**	Ret	92
10	(France) Tom Dillmann	14	11	8	4	5	26	11	25	3	6	8	Ret	**20**	11	5	9	3	5	6	14	Ret	DNS	92
11	(United Kingdom) Jon Lancaster					3	10	12	17	5	1	7	1	23	18			13	17	9	5	Ret	Ret	73
12	(Colombia) Julián Leal	5	Ret	19	16	13	25†	Ret	14	8	4	22	12	15	21	6	2	5	3	Ret	12	16	10	62
13	(United Kingdom) Adrian Quaife-Hobbs	Ret	17	7	8	17	21	8	2	12	11	Ret	16	18	Ret	10	3	7	1	22	8	11	21†	56
14	(New Zealand) Mitch Evans	10	3	Ret	15	12	13	3	3	19	14	16	7	7	2	11	10	Ret	15	11	15	Ret	14	56
15	(Netherlands) Robin Frijns			21	23	1	2	Ret	15	13	Ret	6	Ret			9	Ret							47
16	(Venezuela) Johnny Cecotto Jr.	12	5	10	12	8	5	**Ret**	EX	17	Ret	10	5	21	Ret	14	7	12	8	14	6	8	Ret	41
17	(Italy) Kevin Ceccon	17	22	11	10	7	7	2	7	Ret	12	Ret	DNS											28
18	(Spain) Dani Clos													14	Ret	20	19	18	9	10	21	5	2	25
19	(Indonesia) Rio Haryanto	20	18	15	24	9	24	Ret	16	7	2	18	14	11	10	19	25	14	7	20	11	14	12	22
20	(France) Nathanaël Berthon	Ret	21	17	22	Ret	23	Ret	21	20	Ret	17	15	8	1	22	13	Ret	21	Ret	10	18†	13	21
21	(Switzerland) Simon Trummer	9	6	9	14	19	16	13	23	24	16	14	9	6	7	12	11	Ret	16	16	13	13	7	20
22	(Germany) Daniel Abt	Ret	16	14	7	11	8	16	22	15	Ret	21	18	24†	14	16	16	17	22	13	DSQ	9	5	11
23	(Austria) René Binder	11	8	18	25	20	19	7	6	16	13	20	10	22	13	Ret	20	16	14	18	9	15	16	11
24	(Netherlands) Daniël de Jong	Ret	14	Ret	19	16	18	10	9	22	18	15	Ret	12	Ret	Ret	17	11	19	17	7	19†	17	3
25	(Spain) Sergio Canamasas	19	15	20	11	Ret	14	15	11	23	20	12	17	Ret	Ret	Ret	12	9	11	19	Ret	12	8	3
26	(United States) Conor Daly	13	7																					2
27	(Italy) Vittorio Ghirelli													17	17	18	18	10	20	Ret	19	Ret	19	1
28	(United States) Jake Rosenzweig	18	20	16	19	14	22	14	10	14	21	23	20	25†	15	17	21	Ret	18	15	18	21†	11	0
29	(Italy) Kevin Giovesi	16	10	Ret	17	Ret	17	Ret	20															0
30	(Canada) Gianmarco Raimondo																			21	22	17	15	0
31	(Norway) Pål Varhaug	15	19	Ret	21																			0
32	(Italy) Sergio Campana																	15	24					0
33	(Italy) Fabrizio Crestani									18	17	19	21											0
34	(Portugal) Ricardo Teixeira													19	19	21	24							0
35	(China) Ma Qinghua	21	DNS																					0
Pos.	Driver	SEP (Malaysia)		BHR (Bahrain)		CAT (Spain)		MON (Monaco)		SIL (United Kingdom)		NÜR (Germany)		HUN (Hungary)		SPA (Belgium)		MNZ (Italy)		MRN (Singapore)		YMC (United Arab Emirates)		Points

Key
Colour	Result
Gold	Winner
Silver	2nd place
Bronze	3rd place
Green	Other points position
Blue	Other classified position
Blue	Not classified, finished (NC)
Purple	Not classified, retired (Ret)
Red	Did not qualify (DNQ)
Red	Did not pre-qualify (DNPQ)
Black	Disqualified (DSQ)
White	Did not start (DNS)
White	Race cancelled (C)
Blank	Did not practice (DNP)
Blank	Excluded (EX)
Blank	Did not arrive (DNA)
Blank	Withdrawn (WD)
Text formatting	Meaning
**Bold**	Pole position point(s)
Italics	Fastest lap point(s)

Notes:

- † — Drivers did not finish the race, but were classified as they completed over 90% of the race distance.

=== Teams' championship ===
Pos.	Team	No.	SEP (Malaysia)		BHR (Bahrain)		CAT (Spain)		MON (Monaco)		SIL (United Kingdom)		NÜR (Germany)		HUN (Hungary)		SPA (Belgium)		MNZ (Italy)		MRN (Singapore)		YMC (United Arab Emirates)		Points
1	(Russia) Russian Time	11	7	Ret	6	1	21†	12	1	24	1	5	13	8	10	8	**1**	14	**2**	4	8	1	10	4	273
1	(Russia) Russian Time	12	14	11	8	4	5	26	11	25	3	6	8	Ret	**20**	11	5	9	3	5	6	14	Ret	DNS	273
2	(United Kingdom) Carlin	9	4	2	4	2	2	3	4	4	Ret	7	9	4	3	5	Ret	8	Ret	12	2	16	7	18	273
2	(United Kingdom) Carlin	10	6	9	5	6	10	4	Ret	12	6	Ret	24	11	1	12	15	6	Ret	10	**1**	17	2	Ret	273
3	(Spain) Racing Engineering	7	5	Ret	19	16	13	25†	Ret	14	8	4	22	12	15	21	6	2	5	3	Ret	12	16	10	263
3	(Spain) Racing Engineering	8	1	12	**1**	9	18	9	Ret	13	4	15	4	3	4	3	4	5	1	6	5	3	4	3	263
4	(France) DAMS	1	Ret	13	13	Ret	**Ret**	20	Ret	18	**11**	8	1	13	2	4	2	15	Ret	23	7	2	3	6	224
4	(France) DAMS	2	8	4	Ret	13	15	15	9	8	2	19	**5**	Ret	5	9	7	4	4	25	4	4	Ret	20	224
5	(France) ART Grand Prix	3	2	Ret	12	5	Ret	11	5	5	9	3	2	2	9	6	8	1	6	26	3	20	6	1	168
5	(France) ART Grand Prix	4	Ret	16	14	7	11	8	16	22	15	Ret	21	18	24†	14	16	16	17	22	13	DSQ	9	5	168
6	(Germany) Hilmer Motorsport	22	13	7	21	23	1	2	Ret	15	13	Ret	6	Ret	18	Ret	10	3	7	1	22	8	11	21†	155
6	(Germany) Hilmer Motorsport	23	15	19	Ret	21	3	10	12	17	5	1	7	1	23	18	9	Ret	13	17	9	5	Ret	Ret	155
7	(Italy) Rapax	18	**3**	1	2	3	4	1	6	1	21†	10	3	19	16	20†	13	23	Ret	13	12	24	20†	9	155
7	(Italy) Rapax	19	9	6	9	14	19	16	13	23	24	16	14	9	6	7	12	11	Ret	16	16	13	13	7	155
8	(United Kingdom) Arden International	5	12	5	10	12	8	5	**Ret**	EX	17	Ret	10	5	21	Ret	14	7	12	8	14	6	8	Ret	97
8	(United Kingdom) Arden International	6	10	3	Ret	15	12	13	3	3	19	14	16	7	7	2	11	10	Ret	15	11	15	Ret	14	97
9	(Malaysia) Caterham Racing (1–3) (Malaysia) EQ8 Caterham Racing (4–11)	14	19	15	20	11	Ret	14	15	11	23	20	12	17	Ret	Ret	Ret	12	9	11	19	Ret	12	8	95
9	(Malaysia) Caterham Racing (1–3) (Malaysia) EQ8 Caterham Racing (4–11)	15	21	DNS	3	20	6	6	Ret	19	10	9	11	6	13	16	3	22	8	2	Ret	23	**1**	Ret	95
10	(Netherlands) MP Motorsport	26	Ret	17	7	8	17	21	8	2	12	11	Ret	16	14	Ret	20	19	18	9	10	21	5	2	51
10	(Netherlands) MP Motorsport	27	Ret	14	Ret	18	16	18	10	9	22	18	15	Ret	12	Ret	Ret	17	11	19	17	7	19†	17	51
11	(Italy) Trident Racing	20	Ret	21	17	22	Ret	23	Ret	21	20	Ret	17	15	8	1	22	13	Ret	21	Ret	10	18†	13	49
11	(Italy) Trident Racing	21	17	22	11	10	7	7	2	7	Ret	20	Ret	DNS	19	19	21	21	15	24	21	22	17	15	49
12	(Spain) Barwa Addax Team	16	18	20	16	19	14	22	14	10	14	21	23	20	25†	15	17	21	Ret	18	15	11	21†	11	22
12	(Spain) Barwa Addax Team	17	20	18	15	24	9	24	Ret	16	7	2	18	14	11	10	19	25	14	7	20	18	14	12	22
13	(Italy) Venezuela GP Lazarus	24	11	8	18	25	20	19	7	6	16	13	20	10	22	13	Ret	20	16	14	18	9	15	16	12
13	(Italy) Venezuela GP Lazarus	25	16	10	Ret	17	Ret	17	Ret	20	18	17	19	21	17	17	18	18	10	20	Ret	19	Ret	19	12
Pos.	Team	No.	SEP (Malaysia)		BHR (Bahrain)		CAT (Spain)		MON (Monaco)		SIL (United Kingdom)		NÜR (Germany)		HUN (Hungary)		SPA (Belgium)		MNZ (Italy)		MRN (Singapore)		YMC (United Arab Emirates)		Points

Key
Colour	Result
Gold	Winner
Silver	2nd place
Bronze	3rd place
Green	Other points position
Blue	Other classified position
Blue	Not classified, finished (NC)
Purple	Not classified, retired (Ret)
Red	Did not qualify (DNQ)
Red	Did not pre-qualify (DNPQ)
Black	Disqualified (DSQ)
White	Did not start (DNS)
White	Race cancelled (C)
Blank	Did not practice (DNP)
Blank	Excluded (EX)
Blank	Did not arrive (DNA)
Blank	Withdrawn (WD)
Text formatting	Meaning
**Bold**	Pole position point(s)
Italics	Fastest lap point(s)

Notes:

- † — Drivers did not finish the race, but were classified as they completed over 90% of the race distance.
