= Stefano Coletti =

Monegasque professional racing driver

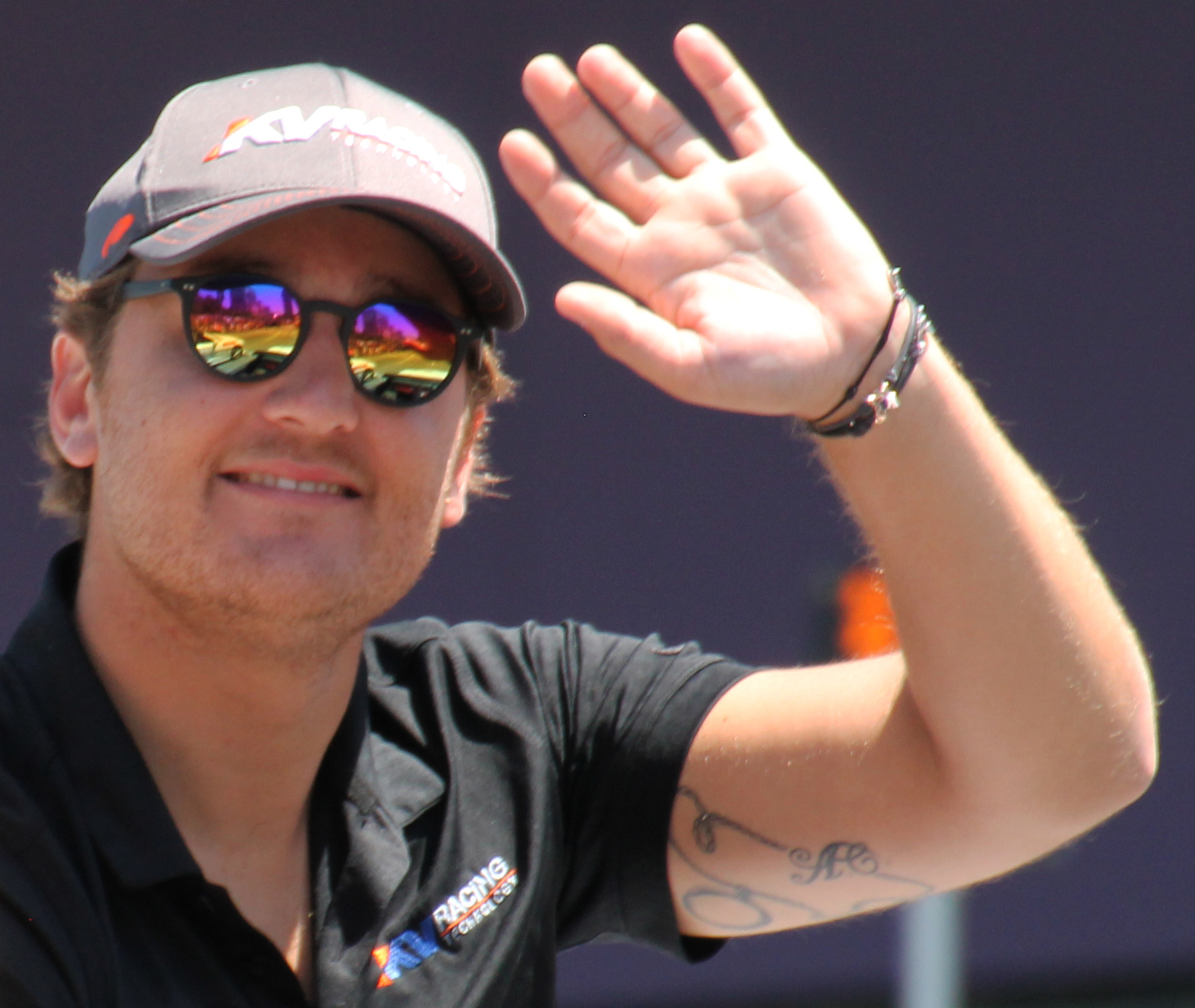
- Coletti at the 2015 Indianapolis 500
- Nationality: Monégasque
- Born: 6 April 1989 (age 37) La Colle, Monaco

European Le Mans Series – LMP2 career
- Debut season: 2016
- Categorisation: FIA Gold
- Former teams: SMP Racing
- Starts: 6
- Wins: 0
- Poles: 0
- Fastest laps: 0
- Best finish: 3rd in 2016

Previous series
- 2015 2011 2010 2009, 2011–14 2009–10 2008–09 2007 2006–07 2006 2005–06: IndyCar Series; GP2 Asia Series; GP3 Series; GP2 Series; Formula Renault 3.5 Series; Formula 3 Euro Series; Italian Formula Renault 2.0; Eurocup Formula Renault 2.0; Formula BMW USA; Formula BMW ADAC

Stefano Coletti (born 6 April 1989) is a Monégasque former professional racing driver who notably raced in the IndyCar Series, European Le Mans Series and GP2 Series, winning seven races in the latter. His sister Alexandra Coletti is an alpine skier. He is the first Monégasque driver since Louis Chiron (1931) to have won a race in Monaco.

== Career ==
=== Karting ===
Born in La Colle, Monaco, Coletti enjoyed a successful karting career prior to moving into single-seater racing. In 2003, he finished as runner-up in the Italian Open Masters ICA–Junior category before winning the Andrea Margutti Trophy and European Championship ICA–Junior titles in 2004.

=== Formula BMW ===
In 2005, Coletti moved up to Formula racing, joining Eifelland Racing to contest the Formula BMW ADAC championship, where he finished eighteenth in the standings. He also took part in the Formula BMW World Final in Bahrain for ASL Team Mücke Motorsport, finishing in twenty-fifth place.

Coletti continued in the championship in 2006, taking four podium places, including a single victory, to finish seventh in the standings. He also took part in four Formula BMW USA races, winning three of them to finish the season in fifth place, despite missing a large proportion of the championship. Coletti once again competed in the Formula BMW World Final, held at the Circuit Ricardo Tormo, where he finished in third place, behind Mika Mäki and race winner Christian Vietoris.

=== Formula Renault ===
In August 2006, Coletti made his debut in the Eurocup Formula Renault 2.0 series, driving for the Cram Competition and Motopark Academy teams, although he failed to score a point in any of the six races he entered.

In 2007, Coletti joined the Spanish Epsilon Euskadi team to contest both the Eurocup and Italian Formula Renault 2.0 championships. He finished fourth in the Eurocup standings after taking a win at the Hungaroring and two further podium places, whilst in the Italian series he took two victories – both at Misano – to finish in tenth place.

=== Formula Three ===
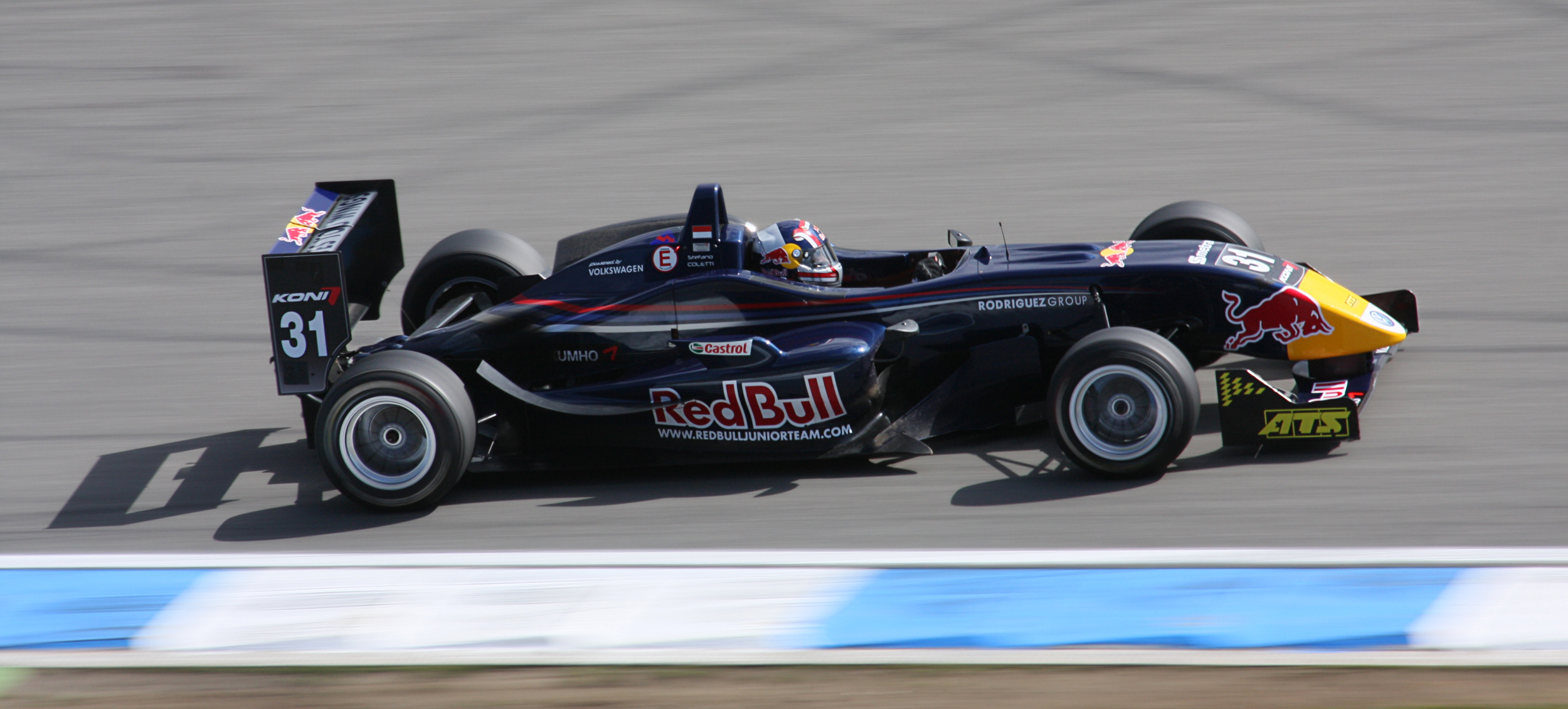
Coletti competing at the opening round of the 2008 Formula 3 Euro Series at Hockenheim.

Coletti moved up to the Formula 3 Euro Series for the 2008 season, joining the French Signature-Plus team. However, he left the team after the first four races after being dropped from the Red Bull Driver Development scheme. Coletti missed the next round of the series at Pau before joining Prema Powerteam, who he remained with for the rest of the season. He took a best race result of fourth to finish the year in twentieth position. He also took part in the Masters of Formula 3 and Macau Grand Prix non-championship races, but retired from both events.

In January 2009, Prema announced that Coletti would be staying with the team for the 2009 season. At the first round of the year in Hockenheim, Coletti qualified on the front row of the grid before going on to win the opening race of the season. The following month, Coletti took part in the Masters of Formula 3 event held at Zandvoort, qualifying in fourth position before finishing the race in third place, behind Finns Mika Mäki and race winner Valtteri Bottas.

Coletti was involved in a controversial incident after the first race at the Norisring. Having finished third to move into third in the championship, Coletti had an altercation with race winner Jules Bianchi. Coletti felt that Bianchi had said "bad words" to him, and struck the ART Grand Prix driver and championship leader. Coletti was then stripped of his third place, and was excluded from the rest of the meeting. Coletti failed to score points after the Oschersleben rounds, and finished tenth in the championship.

=== Formula Renault 3.5 Series ===
In November 2008, Coletti sampled Formula Renault 3.5 Series machinery for the first time, testing for RC Motorsport at Valencia alongside former GP2 Series driver Andy Soucek. On 15 May 2009 it was announced that Coletti would race for Prema Powerteam in the Monaco round of the 2009 Formula Renault 3.5 Series, replacing Frankie Provenzano. He originally finished in eleventh place, but after Marco Barba received a 25-second penalty, Coletti was promoted into the final points paying position in tenth.

Coletti returned to the series for a full season in 2010, driving alongside Greg Mansell at Comtec Racing. He took five podium finishes on his way to sixth place in the championship.

=== GP3 Series ===
Coletti also contested fourteen races of the inaugural GP3 Series season for the Tech 1 Racing team, replacing Daniel Juncadella after the first round of the championship. His team-mates were variously Doru Sechelariu, Jean-Éric Vergne, Jim Pla and the returning Juncadella. Coletti finished the year ninth in the championship; the best-placed of the Tech 1 drivers.

=== GP2 Series ===
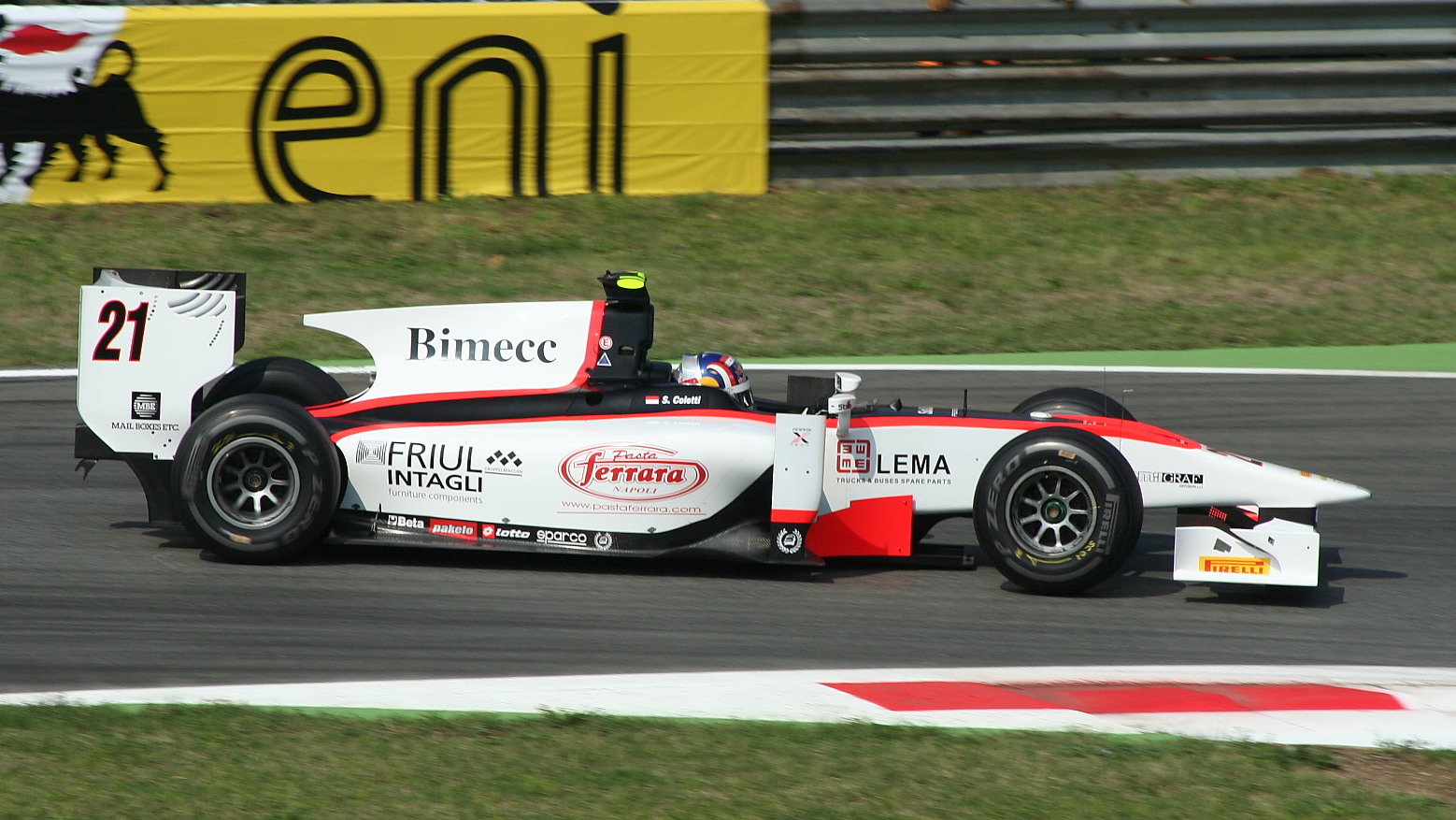
Coletti during the 2012 GP2 Series round at Monza.

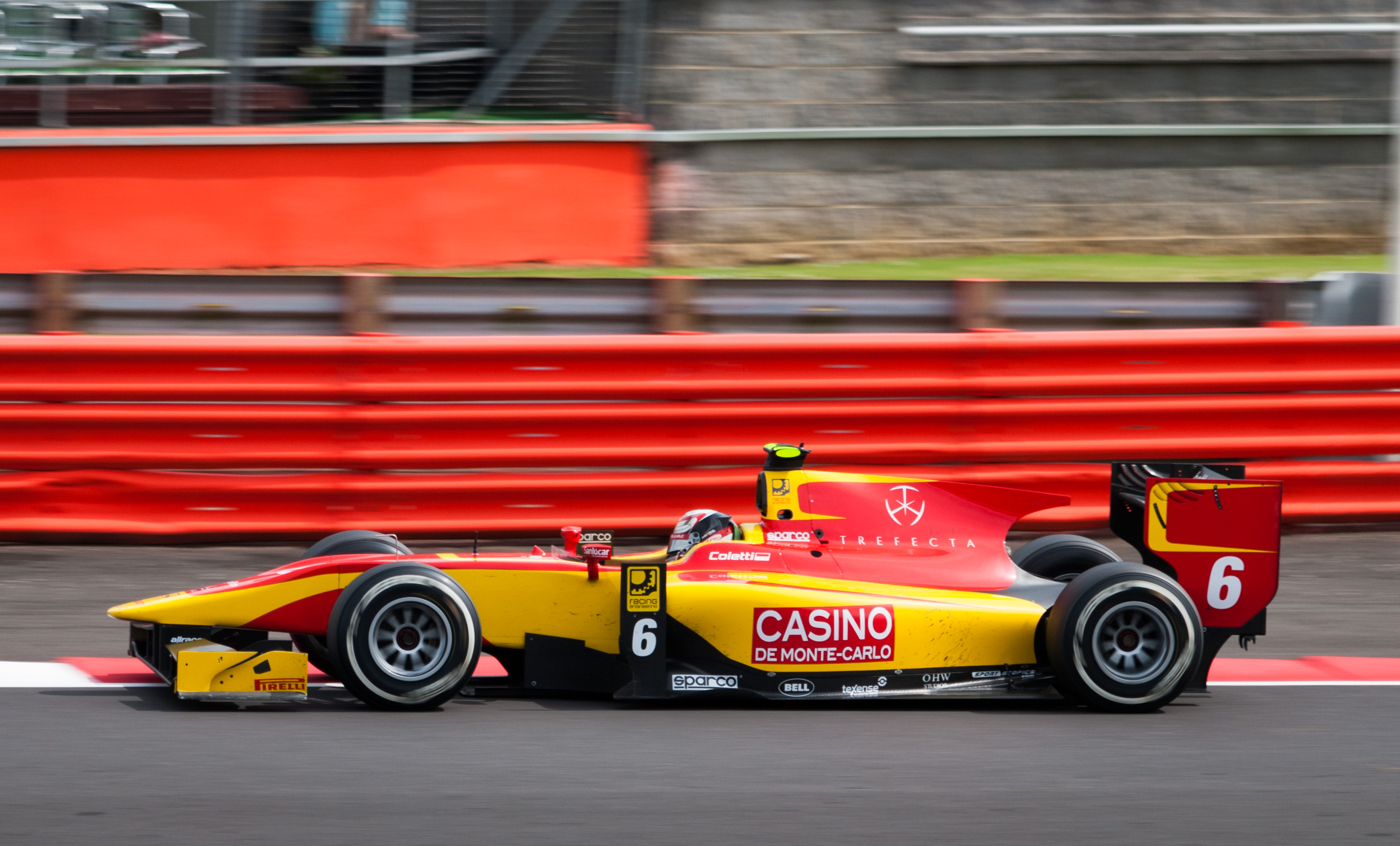
Coletti during the 2014 GP2 Series round at Silverstone.

Coletti made his GP2 debut in 2009 at Valencia when he replaced Davide Valsecchi at Durango. He suffered a fraught first meeting in the series, receiving three drive-through penalties. In race one he received one for jumping the start and one for crossing the white line at the pit lane exit, before retiring from the race. In race two he stalled on the grid and was penalised for starting from the grid instead of the pitlane; he collided with Dani Clos before taking this penalty. In his third GP2 race, at the Circuit de Spa-Francorchamps, Coletti crashed heavily with two laps remaining causing the race to finish under safety car conditions. He escaped with compressed vertebrae and minor bruising, missing the following day's sprint race as his car's monocoque was written off by the impact. He also missed the Brands Hatch rounds of the F3 Euroseries due to his injury. He was due to return to GP2 at Monza having originally been passed fit, but pulled out due to recurring pain during Thursday scrutineering.

Coletti returned to GP2 in 2011, driving for Trident Racing alongside Rodolfo González. In the Asia series, he scored a victory in the sprint race at Yas Marina on his way to fourth place in the drivers' standings. He also began the main series strongly, winning the sprint race of the first round of the championship, held at Istanbul Park. After winning the sprint race in Hungary, he crashed heavily during the feature race at Spa-Francorchamps and sustained two vertebral compression fractures, two years after sustaining a similar, but more minor injury. He missed the rest of the season as a result. His seat was taken by compatriot Stéphane Richelmi.

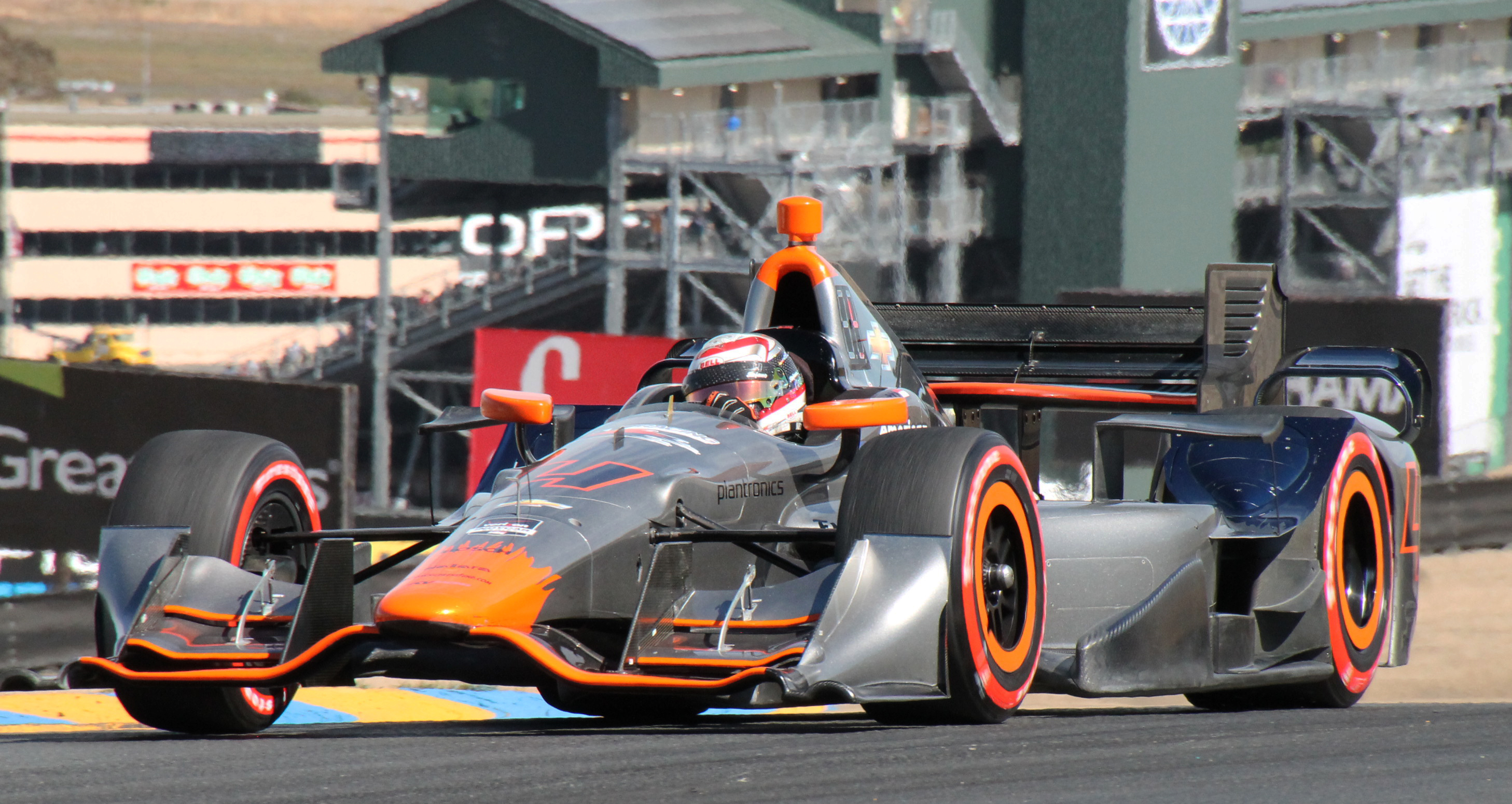
Coletti during practice at Sonoma Raceway in 2015.

Coletti's injury healed, and he returned to GP2 for the 2012 season with Scuderia Coloni, alongside Fabio Onidi, but after ten rounds of the championship, lying only fourteenth in the championship with one podium finish, he left the team by mutual consent. He promptly joined the Rapax team for the final rounds of the championship, replacing Daniël de Jong. He finished in the points in three of the remaining four races, moving him above Rio Haryanto into a final championship position of thirteenth.

== Racing record ==
=== Career summary ===
| Season | Series | Team | Races | Wins | Poles | F/Laps | Podiums | Points | Position |
|---|---|---|---|---|---|---|---|---|---|
| 2005 | Formula BMW ADAC | Eifelland Racing | 20 | 0 | 0 | 0 | 0 | 13 | 18th |
| 2005 | Formula BMW World Final | ASL Team Mücke Motorsport | 1 | 0 | 0 | 0 | 0 | 0 | NC |
| 2006 | Formula BMW ADAC | ADAC Berlin-Brandenburg | 16 | 1 | 0 | 2 | 4 | 103 | 7th |
| 2006 | Formula BMW World Final | EuroInternational | 1 | 0 | 0 | 0 | 0 | 1 | **3rd** |
| 2006 | Eurocup Formula Renault 2.0 | Cram Competition | 2 | 0 | 0 | 0 | 0 | 0 | NC |
| 2006 | Eurocup Formula Renault 2.0 | Motopark Academy | 4 | 0 | 0 | 0 | 0 | 0 | NC |
| 2006 | Formula BMW USA | EuroInternational | 4 | 3 | 2 | 2 | 4 | 75 | 5th |
| 2007 | Eurocup Formula Renault 2.0 | Epsilon Euskadi | 14 | 1 | 1 | 0 | 3 | 71 | 4th |
| 2007 | Italian Formula Renault 2.0 | Epsilon Euskadi | 14 | 2 | 1 | 0 | 3 | 164 | 10th |
| 2008 | Formula 3 Euro Series | Signature-Plus | 4 | 0 | 0 | 0 | 0 | 6.5 | 20th |
| 2008 | Formula 3 Euro Series | Prema Powerteam | 14 | 0 | 0 | 0 | 0 | 6.5 | 20th |
| 2008 | Macau Grand Prix | Prema Powerteam | 1 | 0 | 0 | 0 | 0 | N/A | DNF |
| 2009 | Formula 3 Euro Series | Prema Powerteam | 17 | 1 | 0 | 2 | 2 | 19 | 10th |
| 2009 | Formula Renault 3.5 Series | Prema Powerteam | 1 | 0 | 0 | 0 | 0 | 1 | 28th |
| 2009 | Macau Grand Prix | Prema Powerteam | 1 | 0 | 0 | 0 | 0 | N/A | DNF |
| 2009 | GP2 Series | Durango | 3 | 0 | 0 | 0 | 0 | 0 | 25th |
| 2010 | Formula Renault 3.5 Series | Comtec Racing | 17 | 0 | 0 | 0 | 5 | 76 | 6th |
| 2010 | GP3 Series | Tech 1 Racing | 14 | 0 | 0 | 0 | 2 | 18 | 9th |
| 2010 | Auto GP | Charouz–Gravity Racing | 2 | 0 | 0 | 0 | 0 | 2 | 20th |
| 2011 | GP2 Series | Trident Racing | 16 | 2 | 0 | 0 | 2 | 22 | 11th |
| 2011 | GP2 Asia Series | Trident Racing | 4 | 1 | 0 | 0 | 1 | 11 | 4th |
| 2011 | GP2 Final | Scuderia Coloni | 2 | 0 | 0 | 0 | 0 | 0 | 13th |
| 2012 | GP2 Series | Scuderia Coloni | 20 | 0 | 0 | 2 | 1 | 50 | 13th |
| 2012 | GP2 Series | Rapax | 4 | 0 | 0 | 1 | 0 | 50 | 13th |
| 2013 | GP2 Series | Rapax | 22 | 3 | 1 | 4 | 7 | 135 | 5th |
| 2013 | FIA Formula 3 European Championship | Ma-con | 2 | 0 | 0 | 0 | 0 | 0 | 36th |
| 2013 | Macau Grand Prix | EuroInternational | 1 | 0 | 0 | 0 | 0 | N/A | DNF |
| 2014 | GP2 Series | Racing Engineering | 22 | 2 | 0 | 5 | 5 | 136 | 6th |
| 2014 | Macau Grand Prix | EuroInternational | 1 | 0 | 0 | 0 | 0 | N/A | 6th |
| 2015 | IndyCar Series | KV Racing Technology | 16 | 0 | 0 | 1 | 0 | 203 | 19th |
| 2015-16 | Formula E | Team Aguri | Test driver | | | | | | |
| 2016 | European Le Mans Series - LMP2 | SMP Racing | 6 | 0 | 0 | 0 | 3 | 83 | **3rd** |
| 2016 | WeatherTech SportsCar Championship - PC | Starworks Motorsport | 1 | 0 | 0 | 0 | 0 | 1 | 31st |
| 2017 | FIA Formula 2 Championship | Campos Racing | 2 | 0 | 0 | 0 | 0 | 0 | 27th |
| 2020 | International GT Open | Team Lazarus | 4 | 0 | 0 | 0 | 0 | 0 | NC |

^{*} Season still in progress.

=== Complete Eurocup Formula Renault 2.0 results ===
(key) (Races in bold indicate pole position; races in italics indicate fastest lap)

| Year | Team | 1 | 2 | 3 | 4 | 5 | 6 | 7 | 8 | 9 | 10 | 11 | 12 | 13 | 14 | Pos | Points |
|---|---|---|---|---|---|---|---|---|---|---|---|---|---|---|---|---|---|
| 2006 | Cram Competition | ZOL; 1 | ZOL; 2 | IST; 1 | IST; 2 | MIS; 1 | MIS; 2 | NÜR; 1; 26 | NÜR; 2; 18 | DON; 1 | DON; 2 | | | | | 39th | 0 |
| 2006 | Motopark Academy | | | | | | | | | | | LMS; 1 Ret | LMS; 2 Ret | CAT; 1 Ret | CAT; 2 Ret | 39th | 0 |
| 2007 | Epsilon Euskadi | ZOL; 1 Ret | ZOL; 2; 5 | NÜR; 1 Ret | NÜR; 2 Ret | HUN; 1 Ret | HUN; 2; 1 | DON; 1; 3 | DON; 2; 2 | MAG; 1; 4 | MAG; 2; 27† | EST; 1 Ret | EST; 2; 7 | CAT; 1; 6 | CAT; 2; 4 | 4th | 71 |

=== Complete Formula 3 Euro Series results ===
(key) (Races in bold indicate pole position) (Races in italics indicate fastest lap)

| Year | Entrant | Chassis | Engine | 1 | 2 | 3 | 4 | 5 | 6 | 7 | 8 | 9 | 10 | 11 | 12 | 13 | 14 | 15 | 16 | 17 | 18 | 19 | 20 | DC | Points |
|---|---|---|---|---|---|---|---|---|---|---|---|---|---|---|---|---|---|---|---|---|---|---|---|---|---|
| 2008 | Signature-Plus | Dallara F308/011 | Volkswagen | HOC; 1; 18 | HOC; 2; 21 | MUG; 1; 21 | MUG; 2; 11 | PAU; 1 | PAU; 2 | | | | | | | | | | | | | | | 20th | 6.5 |
| 2008 | Prema Powerteam | Dallara F308/047 | Mercedes | | | | | | | NOR; 1; 11 | NOR; 2; 6 | ZAN; 1; 19 | ZAN; 2 Ret | NÜR; 1; 9 | NÜR; 2 Ret | BRH; 1; 19 | BRH; 2; 25 | CAT; 1; 15 | CAT; 2 Ret | LMS; 1; 19 | LMS; 2; 9 | HOC; 1; 4 | HOC; 2 Ret | 20th | 6.5 |
| 2009 | Prema Powerteam | Dallara F309/014 | Mercedes | HOC; 1; 1 | HOC; 2; 5 | LAU; 1; 15 | LAU; 2; 23 | NOR; 1 DSQ | NOR; 2 EX | ZAN; 1 Ret | ZAN; 2; 12 | OSC; 1; 7 | OSC; 2; 2 | NÜR; 1; 9 | NÜR; 2; 10 | BRH; 1 | BRH; 2 | CAT; 1 Ret | CAT; 2; 15 | DIJ; 1; 21 | DIJ; 2 Ret | HOC; 1; 10 | HOC; 2; 9 | 10th | 19 |

=== Complete Macau Grand Prix results ===
| Year | Team | Car | Qualifying | Quali Race | Main race |
|---|---|---|---|---|---|
| 2008 | (Italy) Prema Powerteam | Dallara F308 | 12th | 7th | DNF |
| 2009 | (Italy) Prema Powerteam | Dallara F308 | 9th | 22nd | DNF |
| 2013 | (Italy) EuroInternational | Dallara F312 | 17th | 11th | DNF |
| 2014 | (Italy) EuroInternational | Dallara F312 | 12th | 10th | 6th |

=== Complete Formula Renault 3.5 Series results ===
(key) (Races in bold indicate pole position) (Races in italics indicate fastest lap)

| Year | Team | 1 | 2 | 3 | 4 | 5 | 6 | 7 | 8 | 9 | 10 | 11 | 12 | 13 | 14 | 15 | 16 | 17 | Pos | Points |
|---|---|---|---|---|---|---|---|---|---|---|---|---|---|---|---|---|---|---|---|---|
| 2009 | Prema Powerteam | CAT; 1 | CAT; 2 | SPA; 1 | SPA; 2 | MON; 1; 10 | HUN; 1 | HUN; 2 | SIL; 1 | SIL; 2 | BUG; 1 | BUG; 2 | ALG; 1 | ALG; 2 | NÜR; 1 | NÜR; 2 | ALC; 1 | ALC; 2 | 28th | 1 |
| 2010 | Comtec Racing | ALC; 1 Ret | ALC; 2; 13 | SPA; 1; 3 | SPA; 2; 3 | MON; 1; 5 | BRN; 1; 9 | BRN; 2; 12 | MAG; 1; 3 | MAG; 2; 7 | HUN; 1 Ret | HUN; 2; 10 | HOC; 1; 7 | HOC; 2; 2 | SIL; 1; 3 | SIL; 2; 12 | CAT; 1; 10 | CAT; 2; 5 | 6th | 76 |

=== Complete GP2 Series/FIA Formula 2 Championship results ===
(key) (Races in bold indicate pole position; races in italics indicate fastest lap)

| Year | Entrant | 1 | 2 | 3 | 4 | 5 | 6 | 7 | 8 | 9 | 10 | 11 | 12 | 13 | 14 | 15 | 16 | 17 | 18 | 19 | 20 | 21 | 22 | 23 | 24 | DC | Points |
|---|---|---|---|---|---|---|---|---|---|---|---|---|---|---|---|---|---|---|---|---|---|---|---|---|---|---|---|
| 2009 | Durango | CAT; FEA | CAT; SPR | MON; FEA | MON; SPR | IST; FEA | IST; SPR | SIL; FEA | SIL; SPR | NÜR; FEA | NÜR; SPR | HUN; FEA | HUN; SPR | VAL; FEA; Ret | VAL; SPR; Ret | SPA; FEA; 12† | SPA; SPR; DNS | MNZ; FEA | MNZ; SPR | ALG; FEA | ALG; SPR | | | | | 25th | 0 |
| 2011 | Trident Racing | IST; FEA; 5 | IST; SPR; 1 | CAT; FEA; 10 | CAT; SPR; 20† | MON; FEA; 5 | MON; SPR; Ret | VAL; FEA; 17 | VAL; SPR; 19† | SIL; FEA; 7 | SIL; SPR; 22 | NÜR; FEA; Ret | NÜR; SPR; Ret | HUN; FEA; 21 | HUN; SPR; 1 | SPA; FEA; Ret | SPA; SPR; DNS | MNZ; FEA | MNZ; SPR | | | | | | | 11th | 22 |
| 2012 | Scuderia Coloni | SEP; FEA; 5 | SEP; SPR; 23† | BHR1; FEA; Ret | BHR1; SPR; 23† | BHR2; FEA; 21 | BHR2; SPR; 18 | CAT; FEA; 3 | CAT; SPR; 8 | MON; FEA; 10 | MON; SPR; Ret | VAL; FEA; 9 | VAL; SPR; Ret | SIL; FEA; Ret | SIL; SPR; Ret | HOC; FEA; 20 | HOC; SPR; 19 | HUN; FEA; 10 | HUN; SPR; 9 | SPA; FEA; 20† | SPA; SPR; 8 | | | | | 13th | 50 |
| 2012 | Rapax | | | | | | | | | | | | | | | | | | | | | MNZ; FEA; 8 | MNZ; SPR; 4 | MRN; FEA; 13 | MRN; SPR; 8 | 13th | 50 |
| 2013 | Rapax | **SEP**; **FEA**; 3 | SEP; SPR; 1 | BHR; FEA; 2 | BHR; SPR; 3 | CAT; FEA; 4 | CAT; SPR; 1 | MON; FEA; 6 | MON; SPR; 1 | SIL; FEA; 21† | SIL; SPR; 10 | NÜR; FEA; 3 | NÜR; SPR; 19 | HUN; FEA; 16 | HUN; SPR; 20† | SPA; FEA; 13 | SPA; SPR; 23 | MNZ; FEA; Ret | MNZ; SPR; 13 | MRN; FEA; 12 | MRN; SPR; 24 | YMC; FEA; 20† | YMC; SPR; 9 | | | 5th | 135 |
| 2014 | Racing Engineering | BHR; FEA; 4 | BHR; SPR; 23 | CAT; FEA; 16 | CAT; SPR; 8 | MON; FEA; Ret | MON; SPR; 9 | RBR; FEA; 4 | RBR; SPR; 2 | SIL; FEA; 4 | SIL; SPR; 2 | HOC; FEA; 4 | HOC; SPR; 1 | HUN; FEA; 18 | HUN; SPR; Ret | SPA; FEA; Ret | SPA; SPR; 7 | MNZ; FEA; 9 | MNZ; SPR; 2 | SOC; FEA; Ret | SOC; SPR; 8 | YMC; FEA; 7 | YMC; SPR; 1 | | | 6th | 136 |
| 2017 | Campos Racing | BHR; FEA; 16 | BHR; SPR; 15 | CAT; FEA | CAT; SPR | MON; FEA | MON; SPR | BAK; FEA | BAK; SPR | RBR; FEA | RBR; SPR | SIL; FEA | SIL; SPR | HUN; FEA | HUN; SPR | SPA; FEA | SPA; SPR | MNZ; FEA | MNZ; SPR | JER; FEA | JER; SPR | YMC; FEA | YMC; SPR | | | 27th | 0 |

† Driver did not finish the race, but was classified as he completed over 90% of the race distance.

==== Complete GP2 Asia Series results ====
(key) (Races in bold indicate pole position) (Races in italics indicate fastest lap)

| Year | Entrant | 1 | 2 | 3 | 4 | DC | Points |
|---|---|---|---|---|---|---|---|
| 2011 | Trident Racing | YMC; FEA; 8 | YMC; SPR; 1 | IMO; FEA; 5 | IMO; SPR; Ret | 4th | 11 |

==== Complete GP2 Final results ====
(key) (Races in bold indicate pole position) (Races in italics indicate fastest lap)

| Year | Entrant | 1 | 2 | DC | Points |
|---|---|---|---|---|---|
| 2011 | Scuderia Coloni | YMC; FEA; 10 | YMC; SPR; Ret | 13th | 0 |

=== Complete GP3 Series results ===
(key) (Races in bold indicate pole position) (Races in italics indicate fastest lap)

| Year | Entrant | 1 | 2 | 3 | 4 | 5 | 6 | 7 | 8 | 9 | 10 | 11 | 12 | 13 | 14 | 15 | 16 | DC | Points |
|---|---|---|---|---|---|---|---|---|---|---|---|---|---|---|---|---|---|---|---|
| 2010 | Tech 1 Racing | CAT; FEA | CAT; SPR | IST; FEA; 24 | IST; SPR; 14 | VAL; FEA; 10 | VAL; SPR; 6 | SIL; FEA; 10 | SIL; SPR; Ret | HOC; FEA; 5 | HOC; SPR; 3 | HUN; FEA; 3 | HUN; SPR; 4 | SPA; FEA; Ret | SPA; SPR; 24 | MNZ; FEA; 16 | MNZ; SPR; 20 | 9th | 18 |

=== Complete IndyCar Series results ===
(key) (Races in bold indicate pole position; races in italics indicate fastest lap)

| Year | Team | No. | Chassis | Engine | 1 | 2 | 3 | 4 | 5 | 6 | 7 | 8 | 9 | 10 | 11 | 12 | 13 | 14 | 15 | 16 | Rank | Points | Ref |
|---|---|---|---|---|---|---|---|---|---|---|---|---|---|---|---|---|---|---|---|---|---|---|---|
| 2015 | KV Racing Technology | 4 | Dallara DW12 | Chevrolet | STP; 20 | NLA; 17 | LBH; 23 | ALA; 19 | IMS; 8 | INDY; 25 | DET; 15 | DET; 16 | TXS; 19 | TOR; 23 | FON; 12 | MIL; 20 | IOW; 20 | MDO; 19 | POC; 24 | SNM; 17 | 19th | 203 | |

==== Indianapolis 500 ====
| Year | Chassis | Engine | Start | Finish | Team |
|---|---|---|---|---|---|
| 2015 | Dallara | Chevrolet | 29 | 25 | KV Racing Technology |

=== Complete European Le Mans Series results ===
(key) (Races in bold indicate pole position) (Races in italics indicate fastest lap)

| Year | Entrant | Class | Chassis | Engine | 1 | 2 | 3 | 4 | 5 | 6 | Rank | Points |
|---|---|---|---|---|---|---|---|---|---|---|---|---|
| 2016 | SMP Racing | LMP2 | BR Engineering BR01 | Nissan VK45DE 4.5 L V8 | SIL; 2 | IMO; 4 | RBR; 4 | LEC; 2 | SPA; 6 | EST; 3 | 3rd | 83 |
