= Tomlinson =

Tomlinson may refer to:

== People ==
- Tomlinson (given name)
- Tomlinson (surname)

== Others ==
- RCR Tomlinson, Australian engineering company
- Tomlinson, Illinois, U.S. unincorporated community
- Tomlinson Electric Vehicles, defunct British motor vehicle manufacturer
- Tomlinson Stadium–Kell Field, baseball stadium in Jonesboro, Arkansas, U.S.
