= Marussia Motors =

Company

- Industry: Automotive
- Founded: 2007
- Founders: Nikolai Fomenko; Andrey Cheglakov; Libor Haluza
- Defunct: 2014
- Fate: Dissolved
- Headquarters: Moscow, Russia
- Key people: Nikolai Fomenko (President); Ondřej Malinka (Chief of design and aerodynamics); Filip Dušil (Chief of manufacturing)
- Products: Automobiles
- Number of employees: >300 (2010)
- Subsidiaries: Marussia F1 Team
- Website: Marussia Motors

Marussia Motors (Russian: Маруся pronounced [mɐˈrusʲə]) was a Russian sports car company founded in 2007. It is considered the first Russian company to produce a supercar. It designed, and manufactured prototypes of both the B1 and the B2 sport cars. Marussia was led by former motor racer Nikolai Fomenko. The Marussia B1 was launched in December 2008 in the new Manege hall in Moscow. In its seven years of operation, the company produced 48 cars, of which around 20 were B1 models and the rest B2.

In 2010, it acquired a "significant stake" in the Virgin Racing Formula One team, which was later renamed Marussia F1. The team competed in F1 from 2012 to 2014.

In April 2014, the Marussia Motors company was disbanded, with staff leaving to join a government-run technical institute. The Marussia F1 team continued unaffected as a British entity, independent of the Russian car company. However, on 7 November 2014 the administrator announced that the F1 team had ceased trading.

== Models ==
=== B1 ===
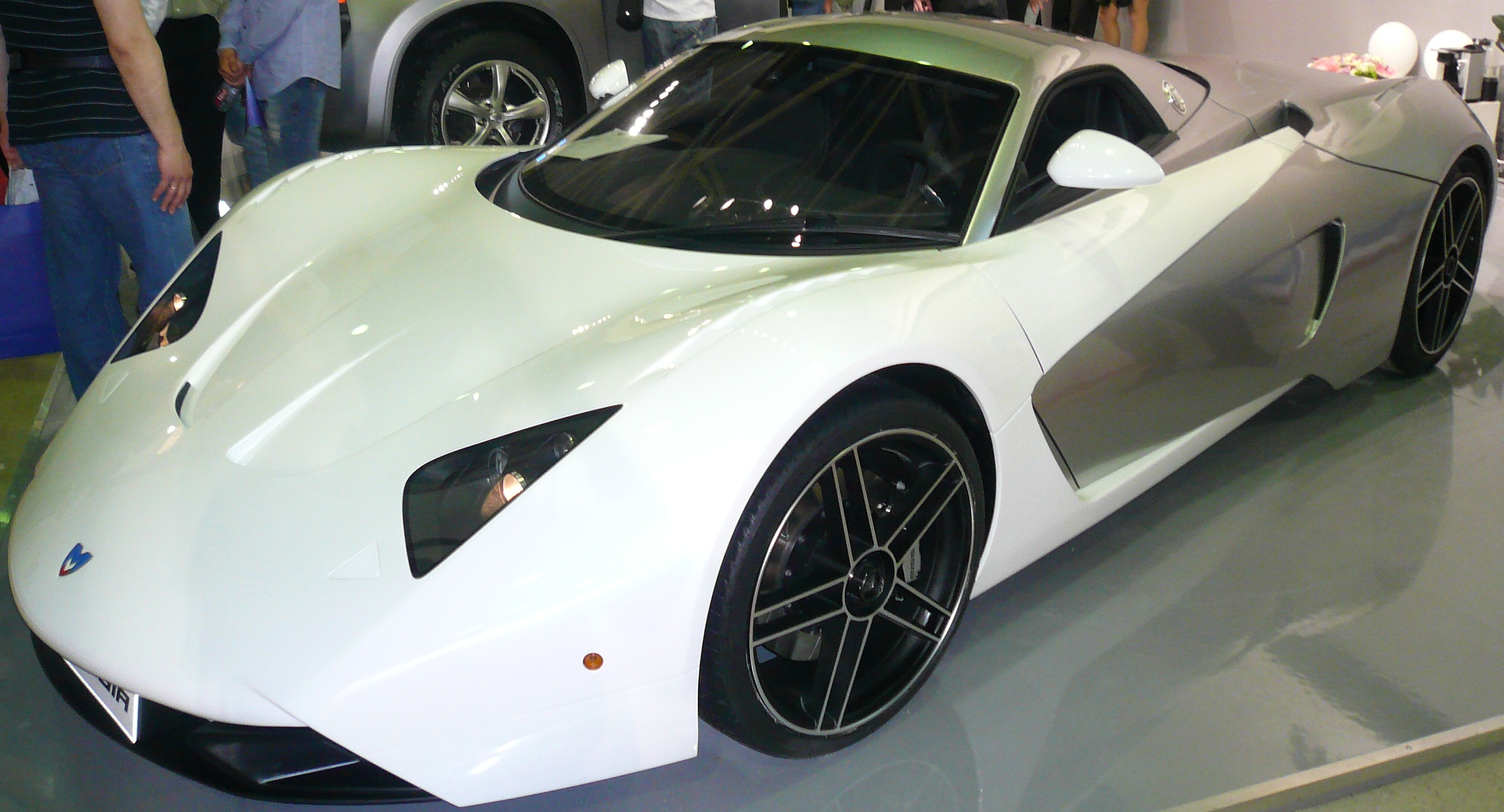
Marussia B1

The first Russian sports car and first car made by Marussia Motors. It has a rear mid-engine, rear-wheel drive layout. Marussia has announced they will build 2,999 examples of the car. The car has been produced at the Marussia Motors production facility in Moscow, with the company's first showroom following in the city in September 2010. Structure is light and strong semi-monocoque and powered by Cosworth-built V6 engines developing between 300 and 420 bhp depending on the specification.

==== Specifications ====
Engine 1 - Marussia-Cosworth 2.8 litre Turbo

- Placement: В Mid-Mounted
- Volume: 2.8 litre Turbo
- Max Power (hp): 360, 420
- Max Torque (Nm at RPM): 520 (600) / 4000
- Type: Petrol, Turbocharged V6
- Fuel: Sunoco
- Lubricants: Valvoline

Engine 2 - Marussia-Cosworth 3.5 litre

- Placement: В Mid-Mounted
- Volume: 3.5 litre
- Max Power (hp): 300
- Max Torque (Nm at RPM): 410/4000
- Type: Petrol, Naturally-Aspirated V6
- Fuel: Sunoco
- Lubricants: Valvoline

Weight And Performance

- Gross Vehicle Weight (kg): 1100
- Top Speed: 155 mph (250 kmh)
- 0-100 Acceleration (km/h): 3.8 sec (420 hp)

Suspension

- Type: Independent
- Front: A-arm, "pushrod" scheme
- Rear: A-arm, "pushrod" scheme
- Hydraulic Booster: +
- Discs: Ventilated
- Brake Calipers: 4-piston
- EBD: +

Dimensions (mm)

- Length: 4635 mm
- Width: 2000 mm
- Height: 1100 mm
- Width: 2680 mm

Transmission

- Drive: Rear-Wheel
- Gearbox: 6-speed Automatic

Tires

- Type: Pirelli P-Zero Rosso/Goodyear Eagle F1 Asymmetric 2
- Front Size: 245/35/20
- Rear Size: 285/35/20

Fuel System

- Tank Capacity (Litre) 80
- Fuel/Octane Number Petrol/95

Chassis

- Type: Aluminum Semi-Monocoque

=== B2 ===
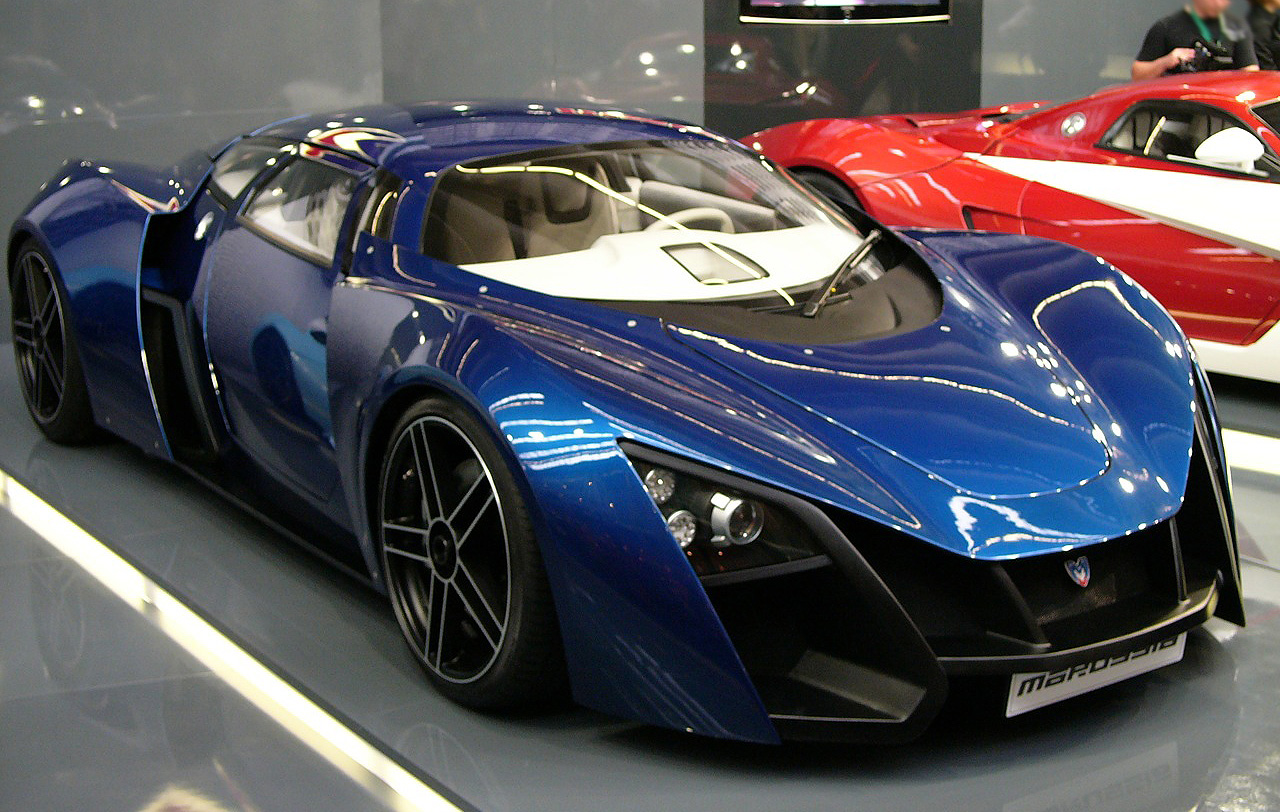
Marussia B2

The B2 features a more aggressive and "brutal" design and is available with the same engines as the B1. B2 was first shown to the public at the 2009 Frankfurt Motor Show. The list price of this model was about 100,000 Euro. A total of 500 units were scheduled to be sold out in 2012.

==== Specifications ====
Engine 1 - Marussia-Cosworth 2.8 litre Turbo

- Placement: В Mid-mounted
- Volume: 2.8 litre turbo
- Max power (hp): 360, 420
- Max torque (Nm at RPM): 520 (600) / 4000
- Type: Petrol, Turbocharged V6

Engine 2 - Marussia-Cosworth 3.5 litre

- Placement: В Mid-Mounted
- Volume: 3.5 litre
- Max Power (hp): 300
- Max Torque (Nm at RPM): 410/4000
- Type: Petrol, Naturally-Aspirated V6

Weight And Performance

- Gross Vehicle Weight (kg): 1100
- Top Speed: 192 mph (310 kmh)
- 0-100 Acceleration (km/h): 3.8 sec (420 hp)

Suspension

- Type: Independent
- Front: A-arm, "pushrod" scheme
- Rear: A-arm, "pushrod" scheme
- Hydraulic Booster: +
- Discs: Ventilated
- Brake Calipers: 4-piston
- EBD: +

Dimensions (mm)

- Length: 4635
- Width: 2000
- Height: 1100
- Width: 2680

Transmission

- Drive: Rear-Wheel
- Gearbox: 6-speed Automatic

Tires

- Type: Pirelli PZero Rosso
- Front Size: 245/35/20
- Rear Size: 285/35/20

Fuel System

- Tank Capacity (Litre) 80
- Fuel/Octane Number Petrol/95

Chassis

- Type: Aluminum Semi-Monocoque

=== Marussia F2 SUV ===
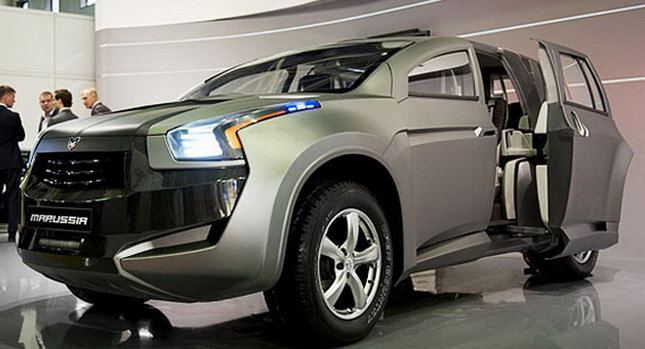
Marussia F2

The Marussia F2 is an SUV model. According to Marussia it can be used as a mobile command center, as a military vehicle or as an emergency vehicle. The prototype was shown on May 2, 2010. 300 units of the F2 were supposed to be made in 2012 by Valmet Automotive.

== Body ==
The Marussia B1 and B2 models are based on the same semi-monocoque chassis with a steel spaceframe covered by carbon fibre panels - differing only in body shape.

== Engine ==
Both Marussia sports models are mid-engined, with the engine mounted transversally on the back axle. The English company Cosworth supplies Marussia with two different V6 engines. One is a naturally aspirated 3.5 litre producing about 300 horsepower and the other is a 2.8 litre turbo-charged engine offered in 360 or 420 horsepower variants. The 420 horsepower engine allows Marussia cars to reach a claimed top speed of 250 km/h and acceleration from 0 to 100 km/h in 3.8 seconds.

== Transmission ==
The B1 and B2 use a six-speed automatic gearbox. A six-speed manual gearbox allegedly was in development.

== Safety and reliability ==
The energy-absorbing cockpit is a three part space frame of steel tubes of different sections. The front and rear subframes are attached to a central cell. In an impact, the subframes are designed to absorb energy by deforming. The B1 and В2 vehicles have passed Russian safety tests and obtained their certification.

== Motorsport ==
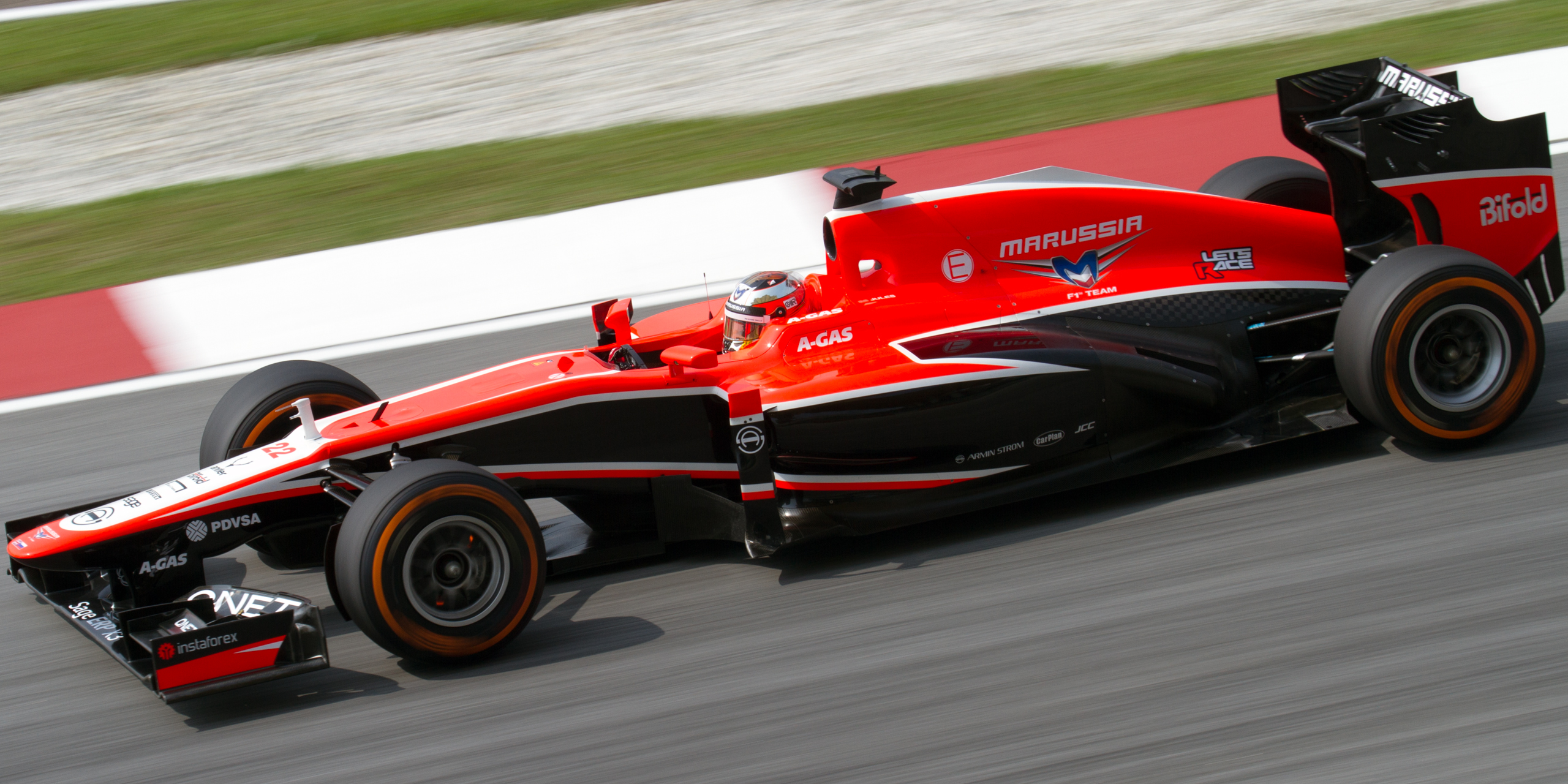
Marussia MR02

=== Formula One ===
Marussia Motors managed their own factory works team after buying into a large stake of the Virgin Racing Formula One team. Later becoming Marussia F1, the team competed between 2012 and part-through 2014. In its first F1 season, it placed 11th in the Constructors' Championship, improving one position to 10th the following year. Thanks to Bianchi's exploits at the 2014 Monaco Grand Prix, the team won its first and only 2 points in F1. In 2014, the team participated until the Russian Grand Prix, entering only one car driven by Max Chilton in the team's final GP, due to the events at the previous Japanese Grand Prix where the team's lead driver, Jules Bianchi, was involved in a serious accident and suffered an ultimately fatal head injury. On 7 October 2014, after a short period under administration, the team ceased its operations and folded. The team's assets were sold at auction in December 2014.

== Plans and prospects ==
Marussia Motors had stated that it was its intention to open at least two new showrooms in 2011, with London and Monaco named as probable locations. The company wished to market its cars to large European countries and some in Asia and Australia within several years, with the United States to follow. Planned steps to support this included manufacturing vehicles in Western Europe and increasing its product range. Marussia Motors anticipated presenting 7 models at the 2011 Frankfurt Motor Show that were to include a new sports coupé, a luxury SUV, a luxury sedan, and a small city car. However, owing to their discontinuation in 2014, the projects never came to fruition.

== In popular culture ==
The Marussia B2 appeared in the racing video games Need for Speed: World, Need for Speed: Most Wanted (2012), Need for Speed Rivals, Driveclub, Asphalt 7: Heat. The Marussia Formula One cars appeared in F1 2012, F1 2013, F1 2014 and F1 2015.
