= John Tomlin =

John Tomlin may refer to:

- John Tomlin, student killed in the Columbine High School massacre
- John Tomlin (American football), former football coach
- John Read le Brockton Tomlin, British malacologist
- Tommy Tomlin (John Albert Tomlin), American football player

== See also ==
- John Tomlinson (disambiguation)
