= Tomlinson (surname) =

Tomlinson is a surname. Notable people with the name include:

- Alys Tomlinson (born 1975), British photographer
- Ambrose Jessup Tomlinson (1865–1943), American founder of the Church of God of Prophecy
- Annie Tomlinson (1870–1933), British journalist and co-operative movement supporter
- Bob Tomlinson, English professional footballer
- Sir Bernard Tomlinson (1920–2017), neuropathologist
- Brittany Tomlinson (born 1997), American influencer and comedian, known professionally as Brittany Broski
- Charles Tomlinson (1927–2015), British poet and translator
- Charles Tomlinson (scientist) (1808–1897)
- Chris Tomlinson (born 1981), British long jumper
- Claire Tomlinson (1944–2022), presenter for Sky Sports
- Craig Tomlinson (born 1972), Jamaican soccer player
- Dalvin Tomlinson (born 1994), American football player
- David Tomlinson (1917–2000), English actor
- Denis Tomlinson (1910–1993), Rhodesian cricketer
- Eleanor Tomlinson (born 1992), English actress
- Eric Arthur Tomlinson (1931–2015), music recording engineer
- Ernest Tomlinson (1924–2015), English composer
- Frank Tomlinson (1925–2007), English footballer
- Fred Tomlinson (singer) (1927–2016), singer
- G. A. Tomlinson, British physicist after whom the Tomlinson model is named
- G. H. Tomlinson, Canadian inventor of the chemical pulp process recovery boiler
- George Tomlinson (British politician) (1890–1952), British Labour politician, Member of Parliament, Minister of Works and Minister of Education
- George Tomlinson (bishop) (1794–1863), an English cleric who served as Anglican Bishop of Gibraltar
- Gerald Tomlinson (1933–2006), New Jersey author
- Gideon Tomlinson (1780–1854), of the Tomlinson Bridge of Fair Haven
- Graeme Tomlinson (born 1975), English footballer
- Harold Tomlinson (1899–1951), British architect
- Henry Major Tomlinson (1873–1958), a British writer and journalist
- Ian Tomlinson, a British newspaper vendor who died in central London after being beaten by police during the 2009 G20 protests
- Ian Tomlinson (athlete) (1936–1995), Australian athlete
- Ike Tomlinson (1910–2000), head coach of the Arkansas State college football program
- Isaac Tomlinson (1880–1970), English footballer with Chesterfield, Southampton and Portsmouth
- James Tomlinson (born 1982), English cricketer
- Jane Tomlinson (1964–2007), British campaigner and fund raiser for cancer charities
- Jeff Tomlinson (born 1970), Canadian-German ice hockey coach
- Jimmy Tomlinson (1881–1963), English footballer
- John Tomlinson
  - John Tomlinson (educationalist) (1932–2005), British educationalist
  - John Tomlinson (bass) (born 1946), English opera singer
  - John Tomlinson, Baron Tomlinson (1939–2024), Lord Tomlinson of Walsall, former MP and MEP
  - John Tomlinson (comics), comics writer for 2000 AD
- Kelby Tomlinson (born 1990), baseball player for The San Francisco Giants
- Kerry-Anne Tomlinson (born 1990), New Zealand cricketer
- Kenneth Tomlinson (1944–2014), American government official
- LaDainian Tomlinson (born 1979), American football player
- Laken Tomlinson (born 1992), American football player
- Louis Tomlinson (born 1991), member of the boy band One Direction
- LeShay Tomlinson (born 1975), American actress
- Mel Tomlinson (1954–2019), American dancer and choreographer
- Mia Tomlinson (born 1995), English actress
- Michael Tomlinson (born 1977), British Conservative Party politician, MP for Mid Dorset and North Poole since 2015
- Murphy Tomlinson, American curler
- Paul Tomlinson (born 1965), English footballer
- P. B. Tomlinson (born 1932), British botanist
- Pride Tomlinson (1890–1967), Justice of the Tennessee Supreme Court
- Ray Tomlinson (1941–2016), American inventor, originator of the '@' separator used in email addressing
- Reg Tomlinson (1914–1971), English footballer with Grimsby and Southampton
- Richard Tomlinson (born 1963), former British MI6 officer
- Richard Allan Tomlinson (born 1932), British archaeologist
- Richard H. Tomlinson (1924–2018), Canadian philanthropist
- Ricky Tomlinson (born 1939), British actor
- Roger Tomlinson (1933–2014), originator of the Geographic Information Systems
- Sada Tomlinson (1876–1953), American nurse and missionary in China
- Sandra Tomlinson (born 1947), Australian basketball player
- Stuart Tomlinson (born 1985), English footballer
- Taylor Tomlinson (born 1993), comedian
- Teresa Tomlinson (born 1965), politician from Georgia
- Theresa Tomlinson (or Thomlinson) (born 1946), children's author
- Tommy Tomlinson (born 1945), Pennsylvania State Senator
- Tommy Tomlinson (footballer), English footballer
- Tre Tomlinson (born 2001), American football player
- Trent Tomlinson (born 1975), American country music singer-songwriter

== See also ==
- Thomlinson, surname
- Tomlinson (given name)
