= Thomlinson =

Thomlinson is a surname. Notable people with the name include:

- Andy Dick, (born Andrew Thomlinson; 1965), American comedian and actor
- Arthur Thomlinson (born 1887), Australian cricketer
- Dave Thomlinson (born 1966), Canadian ice hockey left winger
- John Thomlinson (1692–1761), English clergyman
- Matthew Thomlinson (1617–1681), English soldier who fought for Parliament in the English Civil War
- Ralph Thomlinson (1925–2007), American sociologist and demographer

== See also ==
- Tomlinson (surname)
