= Tomlinson (given name) =

Tomlinson is a given name. Notable people with the name include:

- Tomlinson Fort (disambiguation), various people
- Tomlinson Holman (born 1946), American film theorist and educator
- Tomlinson D. Todd, civil rights activist

== See also ==
- Tomlinson (surname)
