= AutoRAI =

Biennial motor show in Amsterdam, 1895–2015

AutoRAI (Amsterdam International Motor Show)
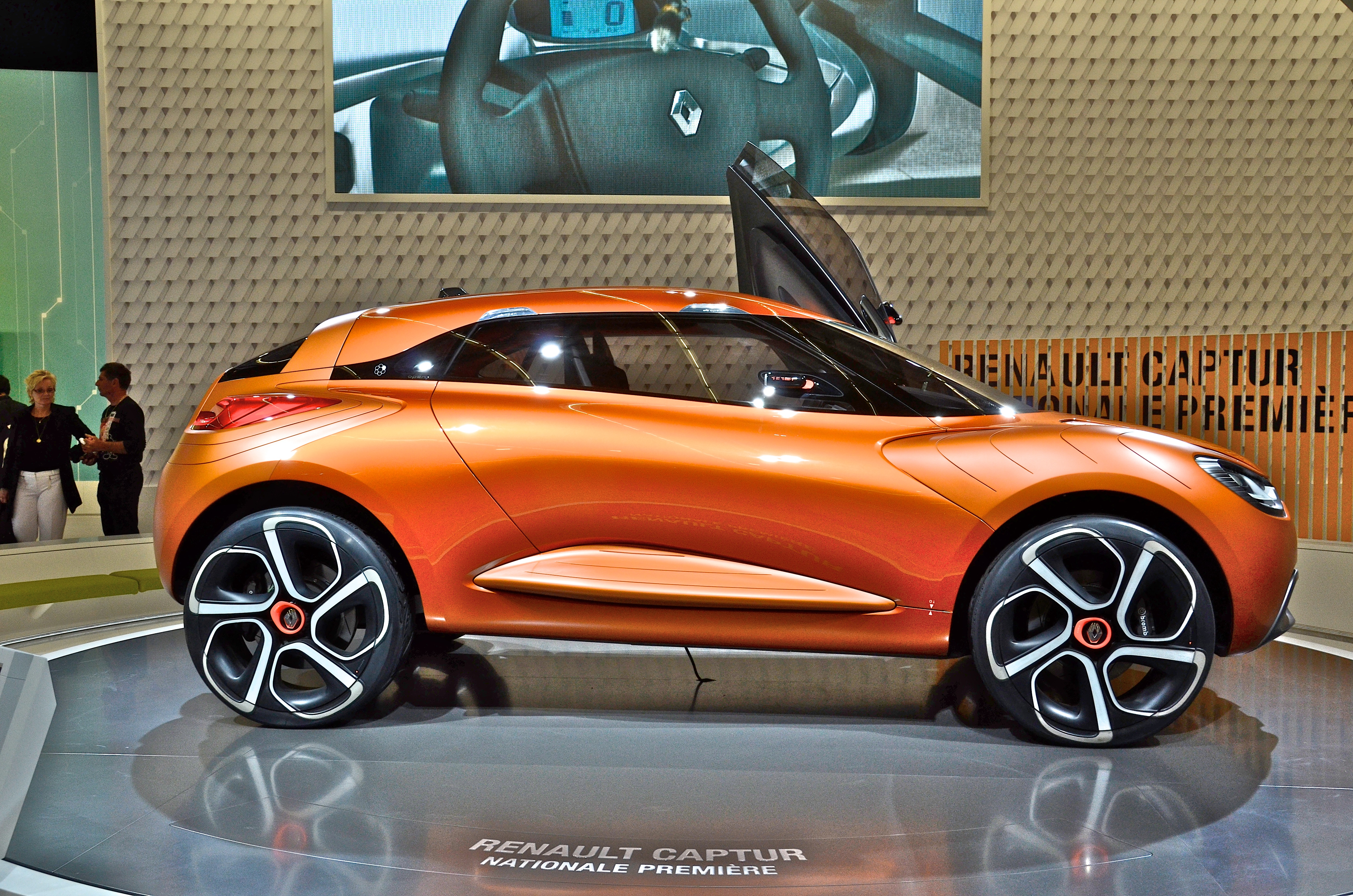
- Renault Captur Concept at AutoRAI 2011
- Status: Inactive
- Venue: Amsterdam RAI Exhibition and Convention Centre
- Locations: Amsterdam, Netherlands
- Country: Netherlands
- Inaugurated: 1895
- Most recent: 2015
- Website: www.autorai.nl/Pages/home.aspx

The Amsterdam International Motor Show or AutoRAI was a motor show that took place every two years in Amsterdam, Netherlands. The history of the AutoRAI goes back to 1893, when the association of Bicycle Industry (RI) was established. The first bicycle exhibition was organised in 1895. In 1900, the Dutch auto trade industry joined the RI organization and the association Bicycle & Automotive Industry (RAI) was born.

== History ==
In 1899, a year before RAI was established, the first automobiles were already officially on display during the bicycle exhibition that opened on 16 March at the Palace of Industry. In fact, they stole the show and the public lined up in big numbers. Until 1913, the automobile, motorcycle and bicycle exhibition took place regularly, but because the organisation found the palace rent too high, it stopped the shows. Only in 1922, when they had built their own, yet temporary building at Ferdinand Bolstraat in Amsterdam (the 'Oude RAI'), the exhibition resumed again and would stay there for some forty years. In 1961, the first AutoRAI took place in the new building at Europaplein, still its current location, which has grown into a big exhibition and conference center.

In the 1970s through the 1990s, AutoRAI served an important function as a European event in a country with very little car industry of its own. Japanese manufacturers thus had a neutral ground (away from the spotlights of Geneva) where they could be expected to make their European premieres of cars already shown at home. The AutoRAI was usually held in February, giving the Japanese four months to develop European market models after the common October (Tokyo Motor Show) premieres of Japanese automobiles.

AutoRAI 2013, which was scheduled to take place in April 2013, was cancelled. The organisers made the decision after consultation with the RAI Association and major car brand importers. The economic developments in the automotive sector had made it impossible to organise a fully-fledged event. The aforementioned parties said they would now focus on possible new setups of the event in the future. In addition to AutoRAI, the AutovakRAI 2013 was also cancelled for the same reasons. After a 2015 edition was organized, it was announced on August 31 2015 that the 2017 edition would be cancelled again due to insufficient space reservation by manufacturers. According to the RAI press release, it seems that they do not plan to organize any more AutoRAI events.

=== 2011 ===
- Audi Q3
- Burton Electric
- Donkervoort D8 GT 24H of Dubai
- ECE Qbee
- Ford Focus 1.6 TDCi ECOnetic
- Isis AM01
- Jaguar XF (facelift)
- Landwind CV9
- Opel Astra GT
- Škoda Octavia 1.4 TSI Greentech

=== 2009 ===
- Alfa Romeo MiTo Linea Rossa
- Ford Focus X Road
- Savage Rivale Roadyacht GTS
- Westfield 1600 Sport Turbo

=== 2007 ===
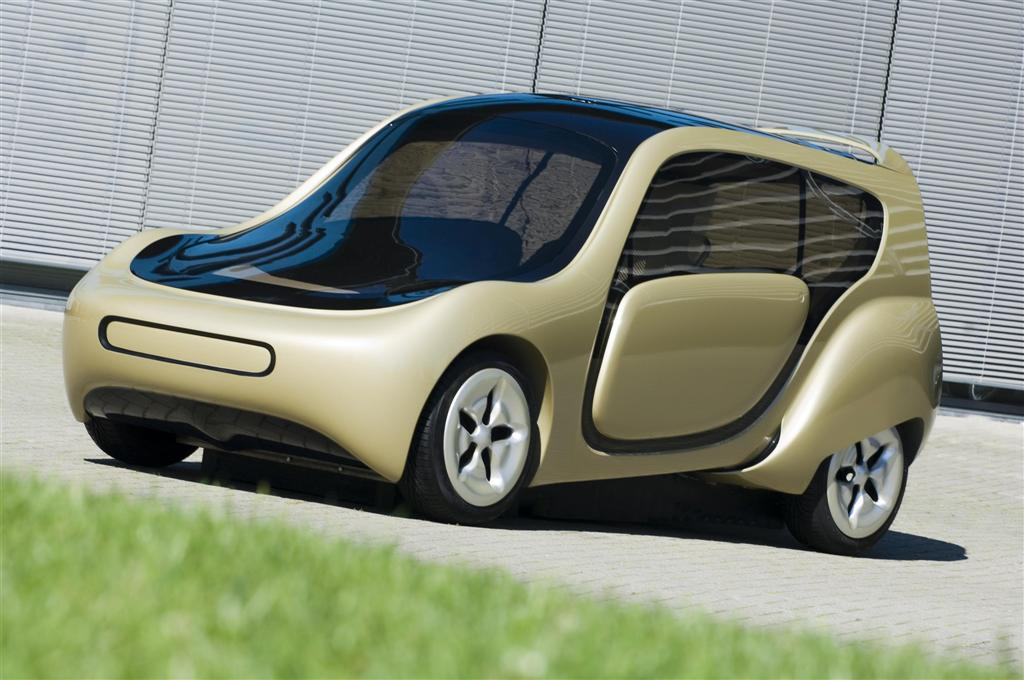
The c,mm,n 1.0, an electrically powered car which made its debut in 2007

- C,mm,n 2.0 Concept
- Fiat Scudo Panorama Executive B2B Concept
- Mercedes-Benz CL 65 AMG
- Suzuki Grand Vitara Bandit Concept

=== 2005 ===
- Donkervoort D8 270 RS
- Renault Laguna II Hatchback (facelift)
- Wiesmann GT
- MG TF
- MG TF GT (Coupe)
- MG SV

=== 2003 ===
- Mercedes-Benz E-Class Combi
- Mercedes-Benz SL 600
- Opel Astra 1.3 CDTi
- Smart City Coupe facelift
- Toyota Yaris facelift
- Toyota Yaris Verso facelift
- Volkswagen Touran
- Volvo S80 facelift

=== 2001 ===
- Mercedes-Benz C-Klasse Combi
- Mercedes-Benz C-Klasse C 32 AMG
- Mercedes-Benz SLK 32 AMG
- Spyker C8 Laviolette
- Suzuki Grand Vitara XL-7

=== 1999 ===
- Alfa Romeo 145 and 146 facelift
- Audi S3
- Chevrolet Alero
- Daihatsu Gran Move
- Opel Vectra
- Porsche 911 GT2
- Renault Megane Break

=== 1997 ===
- BMW 5 Series Touring
- Jeep Cherokee 2.5 TD
- Jösse Car Indigo 3000
- Mazda 323P
- Mercedes-Benz CLK-Class (C208)
- Mitsubishi Galant

=== 1995 ===
- Daihatsu Cuore (export model premiere)
- Daihatsu Valera
- Ford Escort facelift
- Ford Galaxy
- Mitsubishi Carisma
- Rover 100 facelift
- Rover 600 620 Di
- Suzuki Baleno 3-door
- Volkswagen Sharan

=== 1993 ===
1993 was the largest Amsterdam show to date, with the original single hall now being the centre of a much bigger exhibition. There were also more new car presentations than usual for Amsterdam, headlined by the all new Peugeot 306.

- Jaguar XJ12 (XJ81)
- Mitsubishi Galant Hatchback
- Peugeot 306
- Toyota Carina E
- Volvo 850 Estate

=== 1991 ===
- Audi 100
- De Tomaso Pantera facelift
- Fiat Croma facelift
- Hyundai Lantra
- Lancia Dedra Turbo
- Lancia Dedra Integrale
- Maserati 222 SR
- MAX Pick-Up
- Škoda Favorit Estate (Forman)
- Yue Loong Feeling

=== 1989 ===
- MAX Roadster 205

=== 1987 ===
- Ford Sierra Sedan
- Hyundai Pony 3-door
- Opel Omega 3000
- Mazda 929
- Nissan Micra 5-door

=== 1985 ===
- BMW M5
- MAX Roadster
- Renault Alpine GTA

=== 1983 ===
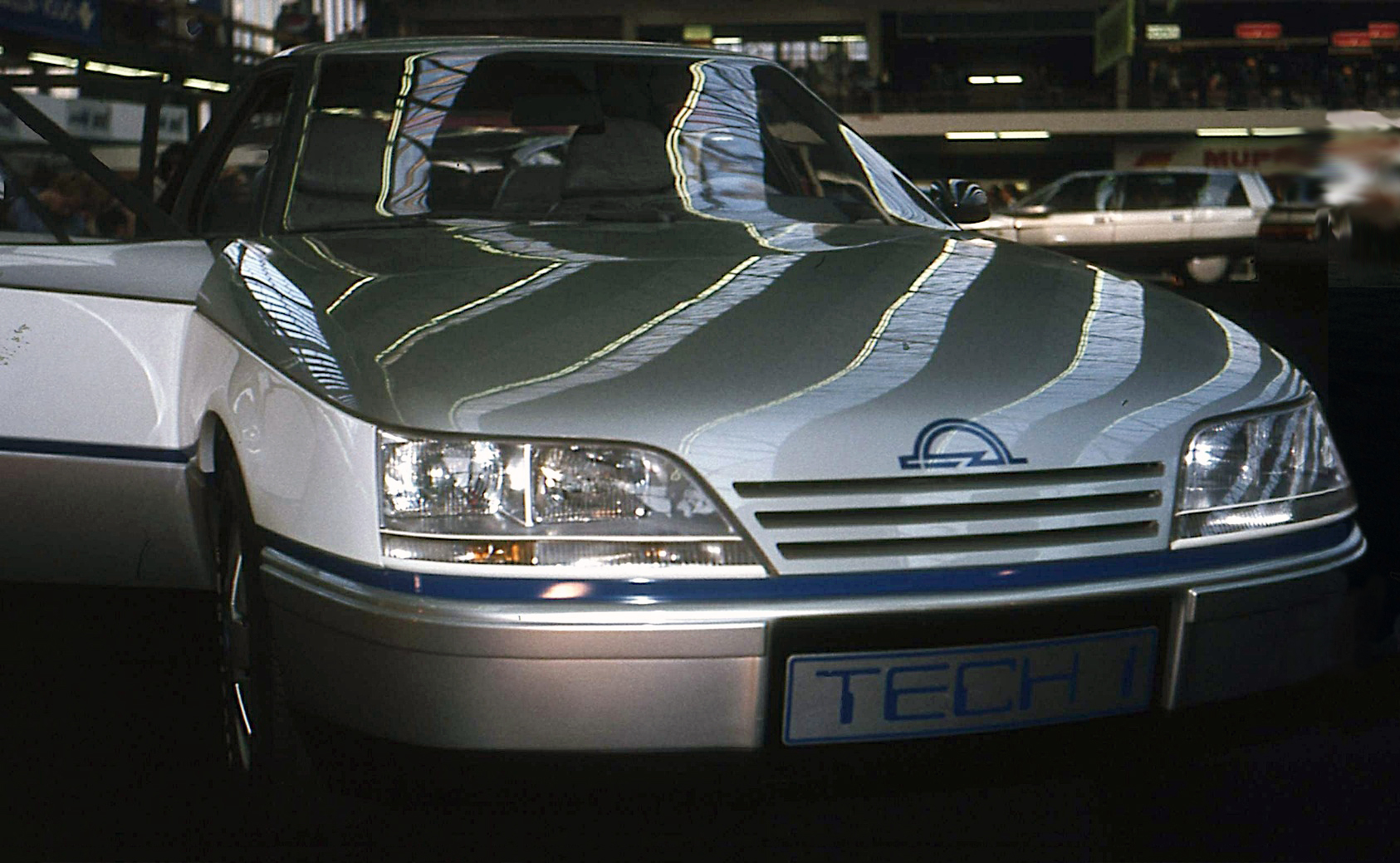
Opel Tech 1 at the 1983 AutoRAI

- Opel Tech 1 concept car
- Honda Prelude

=== 1981 ===
- Suzuki Alto SS80 (European premiere)

=== 1979 ===
- Honda Prelude (world premiere)
- Datsun Cherry (variant of the earlier "Nissan Pulsar")
- Suzuki SC100 (bigger-engined export variant of the "Suzuki Cervo")

=== 1967 ===
- Ford Cortina Estate
- Pontiac Firebird

=== 1965 ===
- Alfa Romeo Giulia Sprint GTA

=== 1963 ===
- DAF 33 Combi

=== 1958 ===
- DAF 600

=== 1948 ===
- Gatso 4000 Aero Coupé
- Land Rover Series 1
