= Marussia B-Series =

The Marussia B-Series was a series of sports cars built by Russian automaker Marussia Motors (pronounced ma-rus-ya). The series consists of the B1 and the B2; the cars are technically similar but are very different in design. The two vehicles had the same engines, layout, features, suspension, and brakes. Priced at over 4,000,000 ruble (from 120,000 € to 185,000 €), they were the first Russian supercars ever built. It featured a full carbon fiber car with aluminium chassis. About 3,500 units were planned to be built.

== B1 ==
Marussia B1
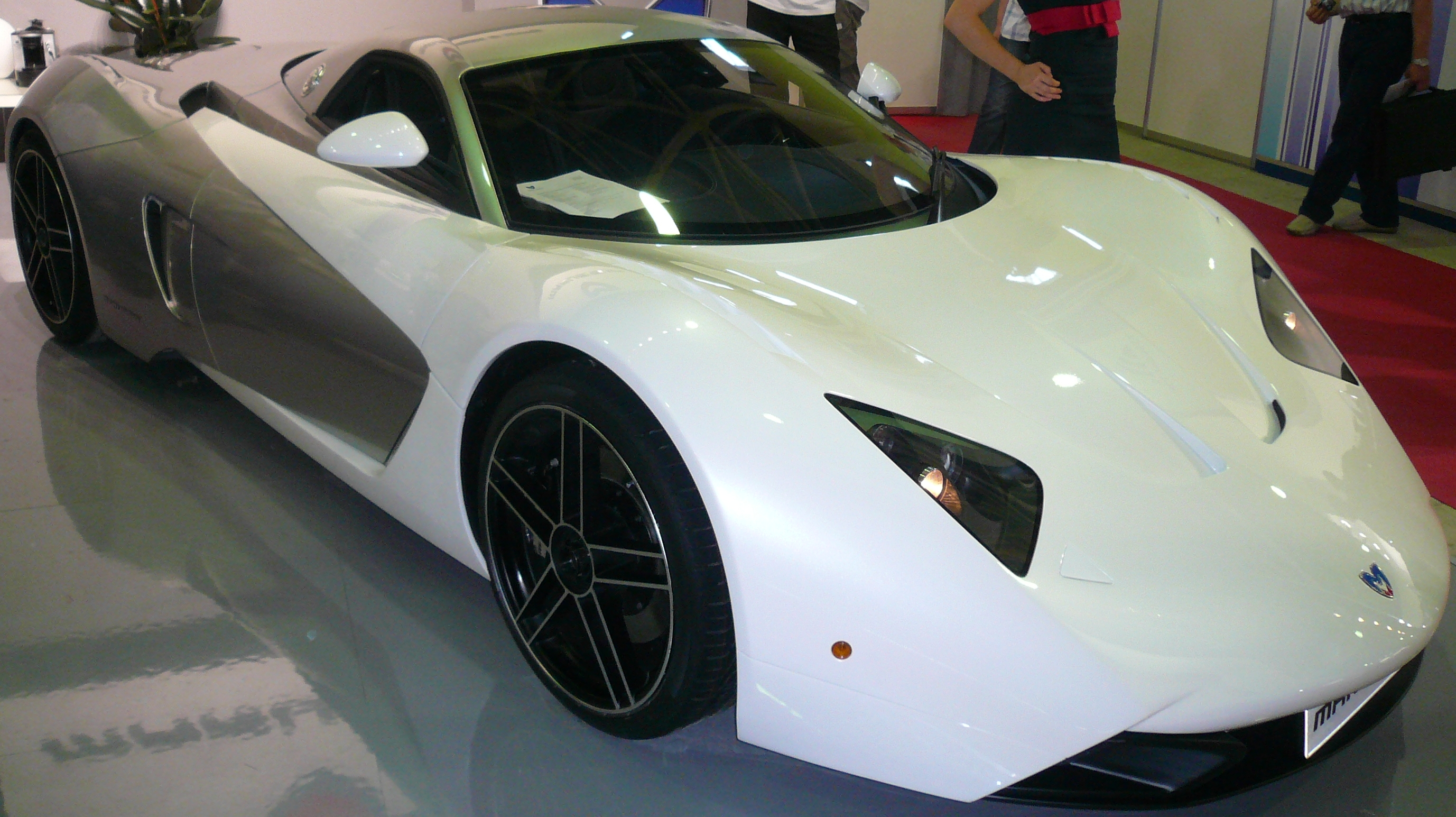
- B1 at the exhibition in Moscow

Overview
- Manufacturer: Marussia Motors
- Production: 2008–2015
- Assembly: Moscow, Russia

Body and chassis
- Class: Sports car (S)
- Body style: 2-door coupé
- Layout: RMR
- Doors: Butterfly

Powertrain
- Engine: 3,500 cubic centimetres (210 cu in; 3.5 L) V6 or 2,800 cubic centimetres (170 cu in; 2.8 L) Turbocharged Cosworth V6
- Power output: 3.5L V6: 300.0 brake horsepower (304.2 PS; 223.7 kW); 410.0 newton-metres (302.4 lbf⋅ft) @ 4,000 rpm 2.8L Cosworth V6T 420.0 brake horsepower (425.8 PS; 313.2 kW); 600.0 newton-metres (442.5 lbf⋅ft) @ 4,000 rpm
- Transmission: 6-speed automatic or 6-speed manual (in development)

Dimensions
- Length: 4,635 mm (182.5 in)
- Width: 2,000 mm (78.7 in)
- Height: 1,100 mm (43.3 in)
- Curb weight: 1,100 kg (2,425 lb)

Chronology
- Successor: Marussia B2

The B1 was the first car of the series and the first car produced by Marussia Motors. The chassis was built on an aluminum semi-monocoque design, and the engines were produced by a British engineering company Cosworth. Marussia had planned to only produce 2999 B1s. Engine power is 360 or 420 hp (268 or 313 kW), top speed is 305 km/h (190 mph) and it accelerates from 0–100 km/h (0-62 mph) in 3.2 seconds.

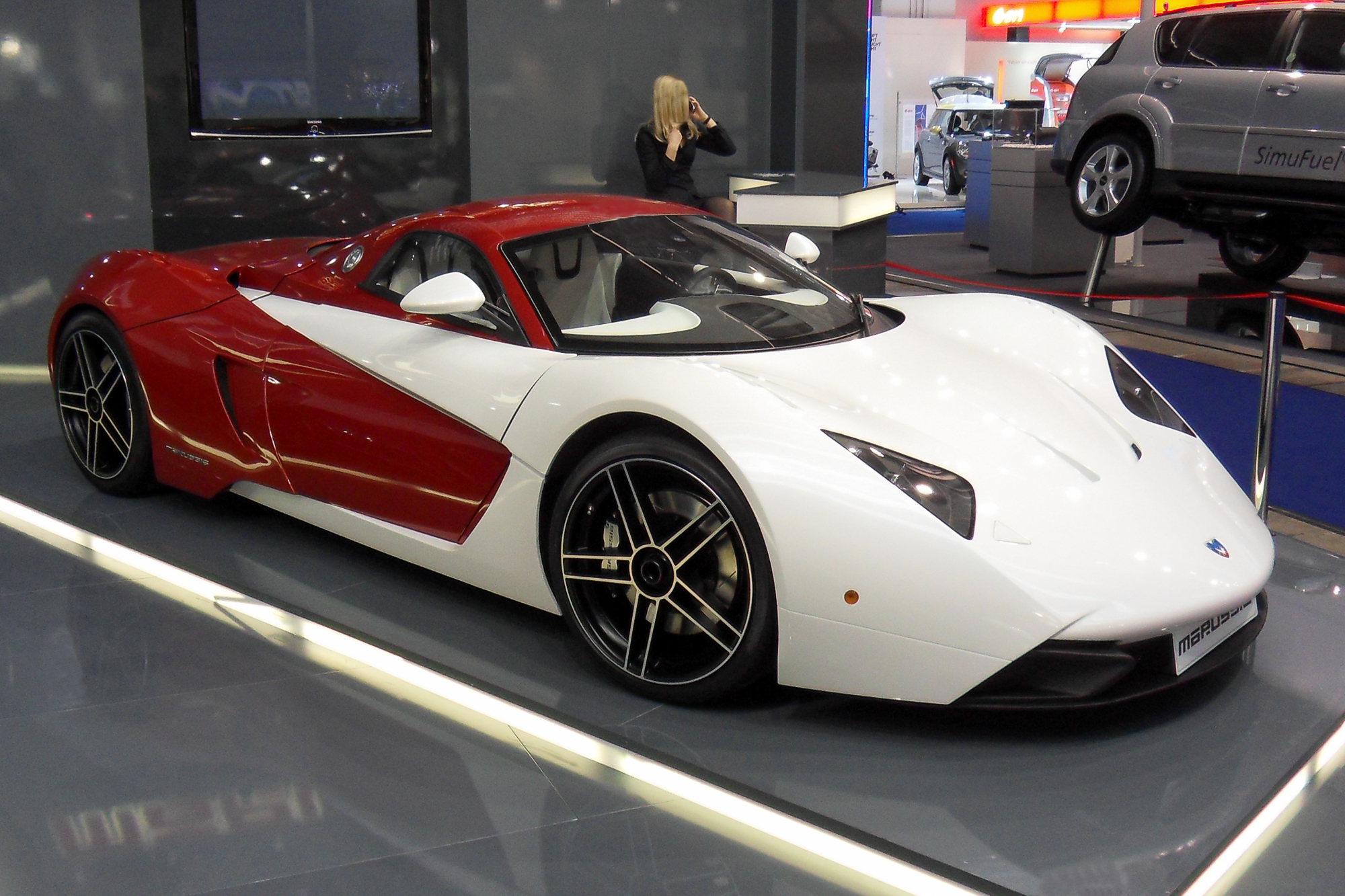
B1 at the IAA Germany

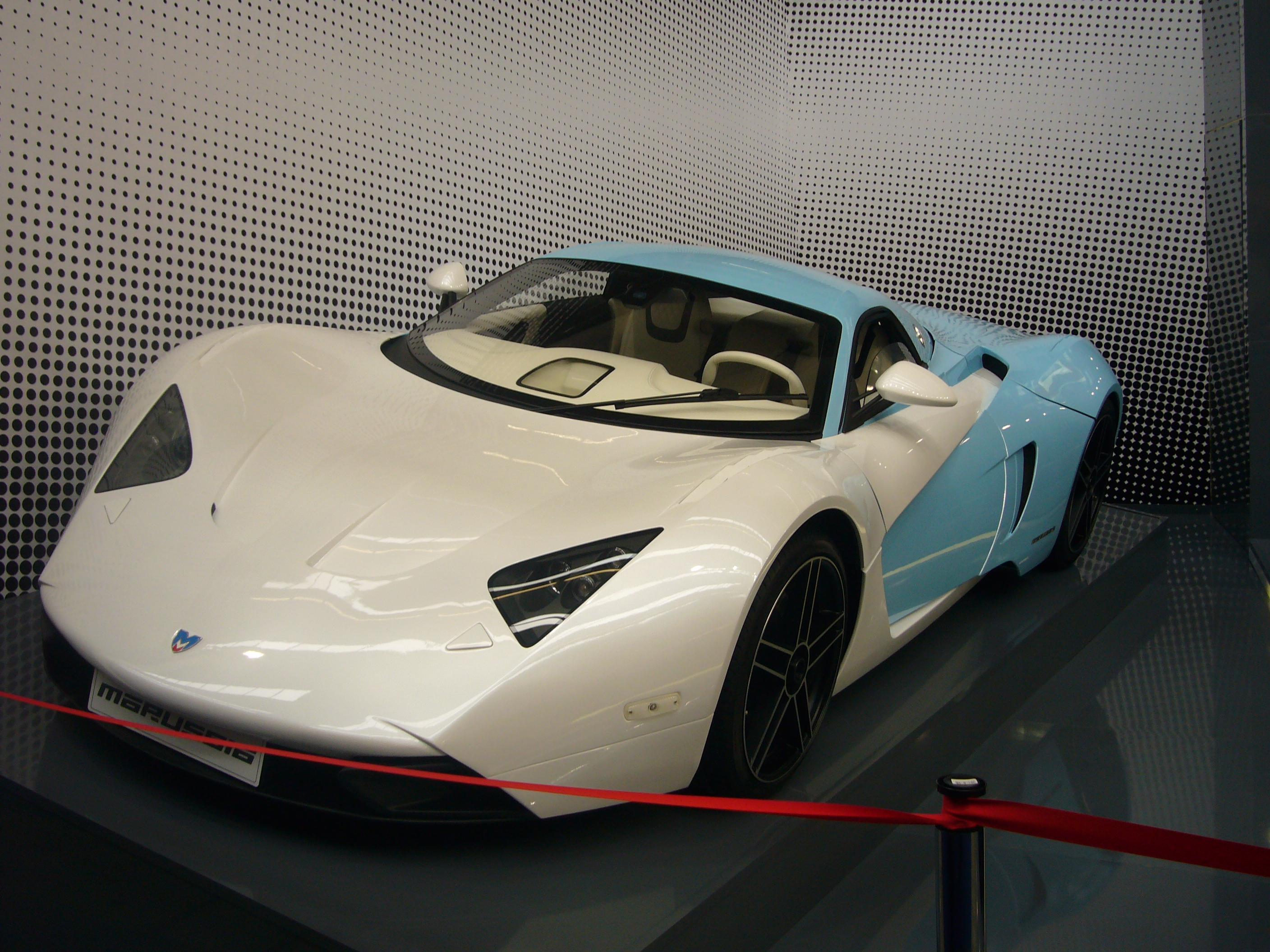
B1 at the IAA Germany

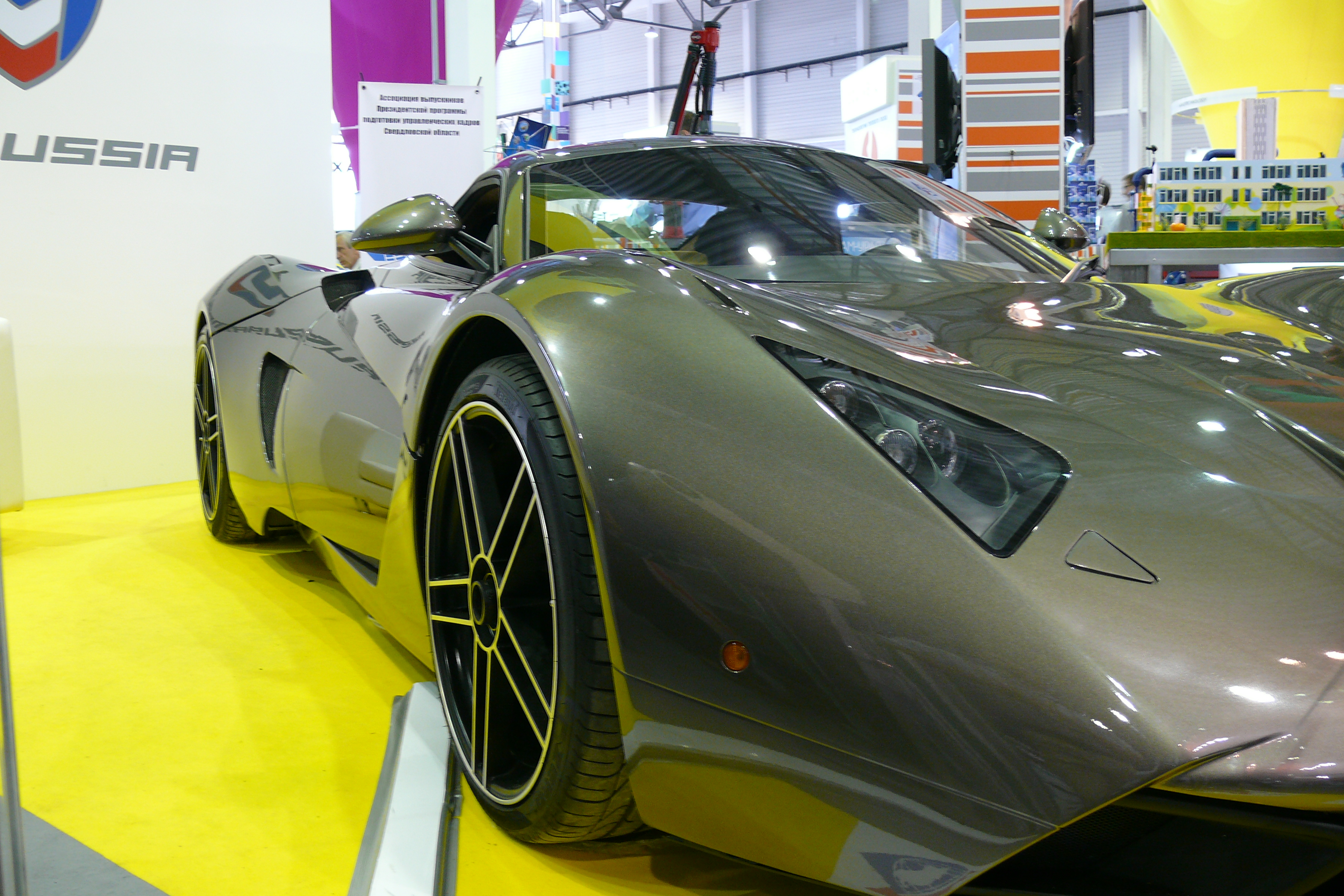
B1 headlight detail at the Innoprom

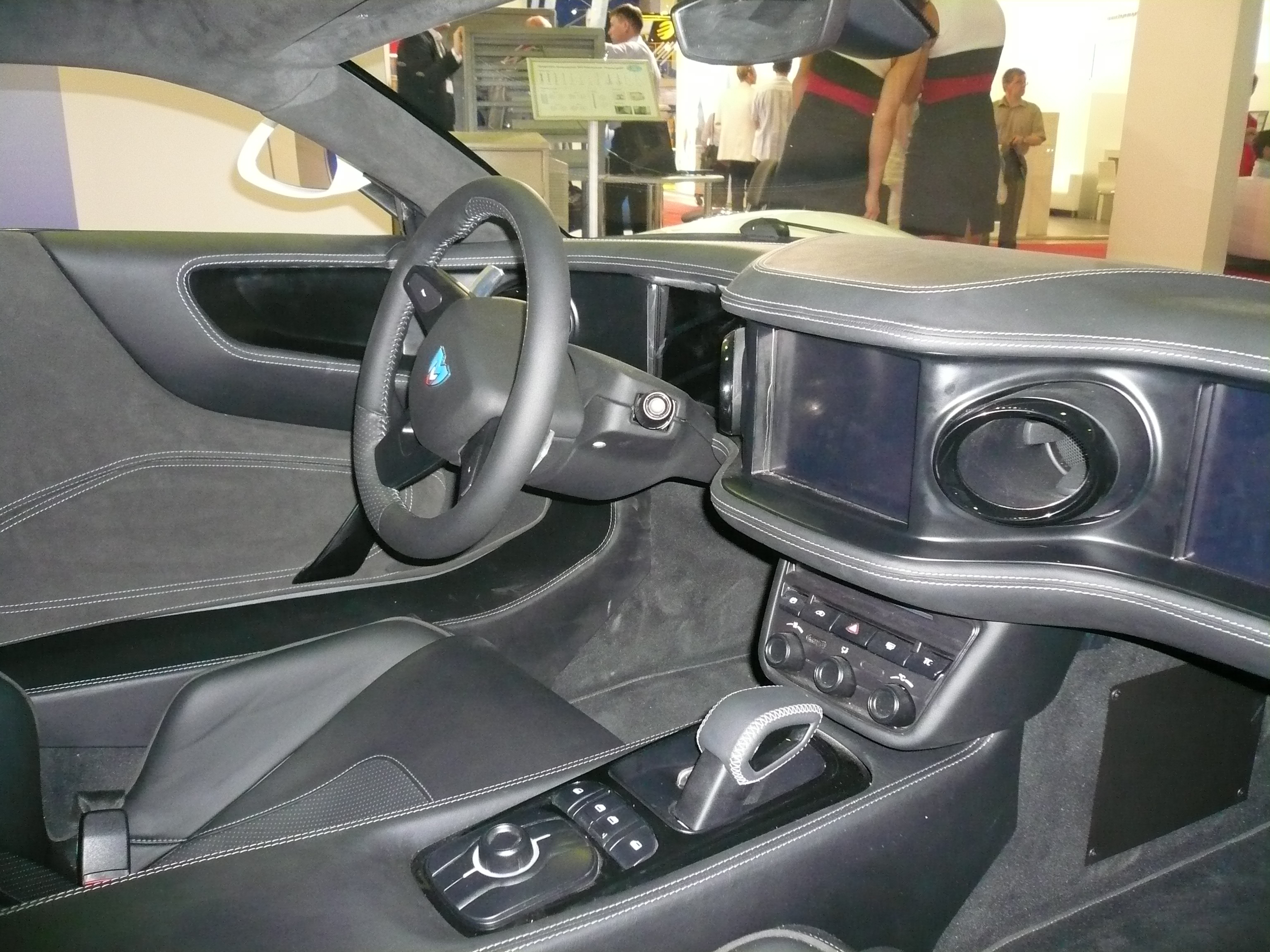
The interior of B1

== B2 ==
Marussia B2
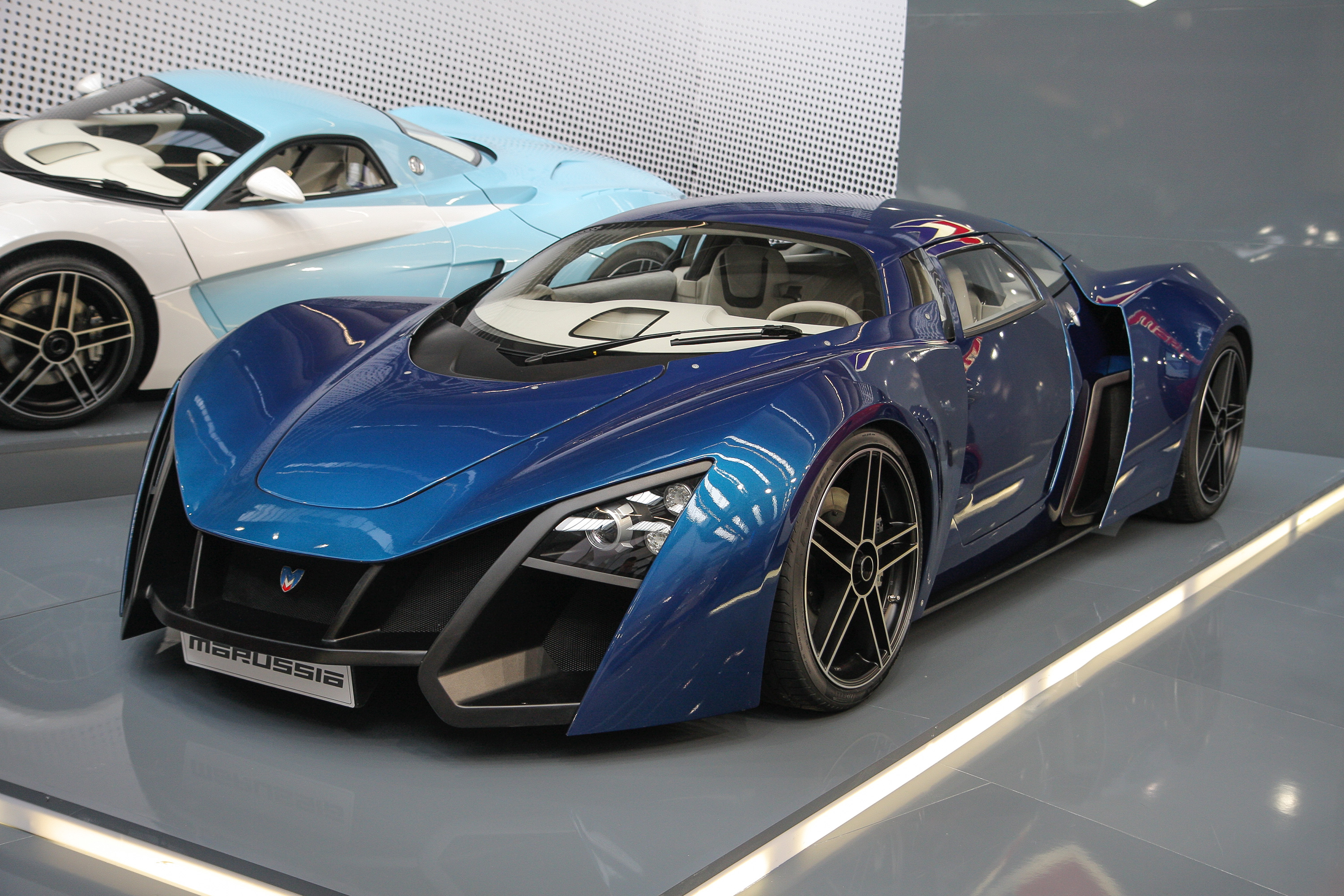
- B2 at the IAA Germany

Overview
- Manufacturer: Marussia Motors
- Production: 2009–2015
- Assembly: Moscow, Russia; Uusikaupunki, Finland (Valmet)

Body and chassis
- Class: Sports car (S)
- Body style: 2-door coupé
- Layout: RMR
- Doors: Swan

Powertrain
- Engine: 3,500 cubic centimetres (210 cu in; 3.5 L) V6 or 2,800 cubic centimetres (170 cu in; 2.8 L) Turbocharged Cosworth V6
- Power output: 3.5L V6: 300.0 brake horsepower (304.2 PS; 223.7 kW); 410.0 newton-metres (302.4 lbf⋅ft) @ 4,000 rpm 2.8L Cosworth V6T 420.0 brake horsepower (425.8 PS; 313.2 kW); 600.0 newton-metres (442.5 lbf⋅ft) @ 4,000 rpm
- Transmission: 6-speed automatic or 6-speed manual (in development)

Dimensions
- Length: 4,635 mm (182.5 in)
- Width: 2,000 mm (78.7 in)
- Height: 1,100 mm (43.3 in)
- Curb weight: 1,100 kg (2,425 lb)

Chronology
- Predecessor: Marussia B1

The B2 is the B1's successor, first shown to the public at the 2009 Frankfurt Motor Show. The differences between the B1 and the B2 are only cosmetic; the B2 offers a new, edgier design and a new, almost space-age interior. The plan was meant to give the car a more aggressive look. Some design features include highlighting the grille and intakes in black to contrast them to the car's body colour and emphasize some of the car's geometric elements, as well as styling the car's face to the shape of the "M" in the Marussia Motors logo. It used primarily parts from the cheapest European cars that are small and ultra-small, except the engine from Opel. The company hoped to get good power from it, as follows: Engine power is 420 hp (313 kW), top speed is 310 km/h (193 mph) and acceleration from 0–100 km/h is in 3.2 seconds.

The B2 was featured in Need for Speed: Most Wanted in 2012, Need for Speed Rivals and Asphalt 8: Airborne in 2013. In 2014 the car was also featured in Driveclub as a playable vehicle and in the official cover art for the PlayStation 4 exclusive.

In March 2012, a Finnish contract manufacturer of specialty automobiles, Valmet Automotive, and Marussia Motors entered into an agreement on the production of Marussia B2 sports cars at the Valmet car factory in Uusikaupunki, Finland. Marussia only created 500 units of this model, as were planned from the start and less than 12 months after hitting the market, all units have already been ordered.

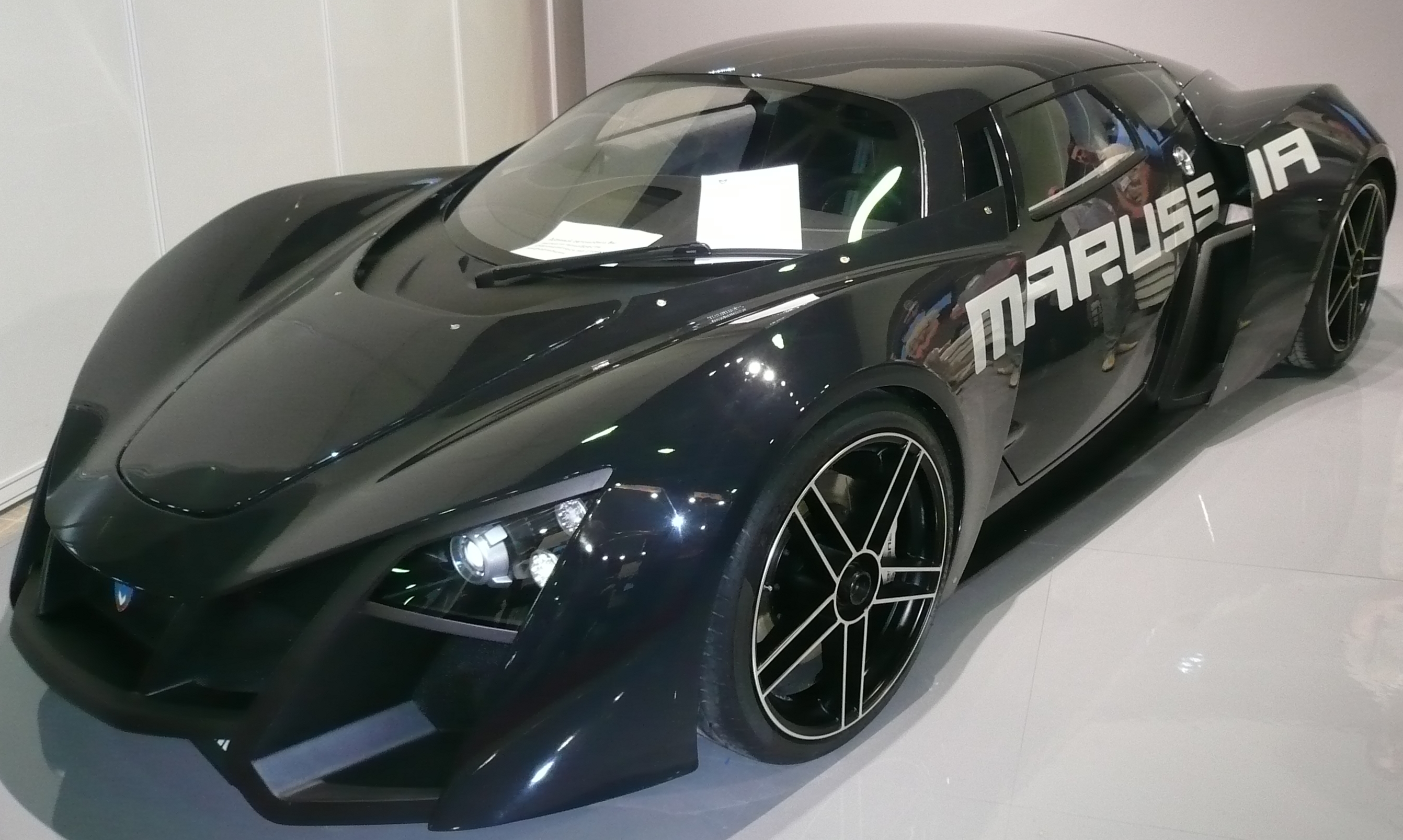
B2 at the exhibition in Moscow

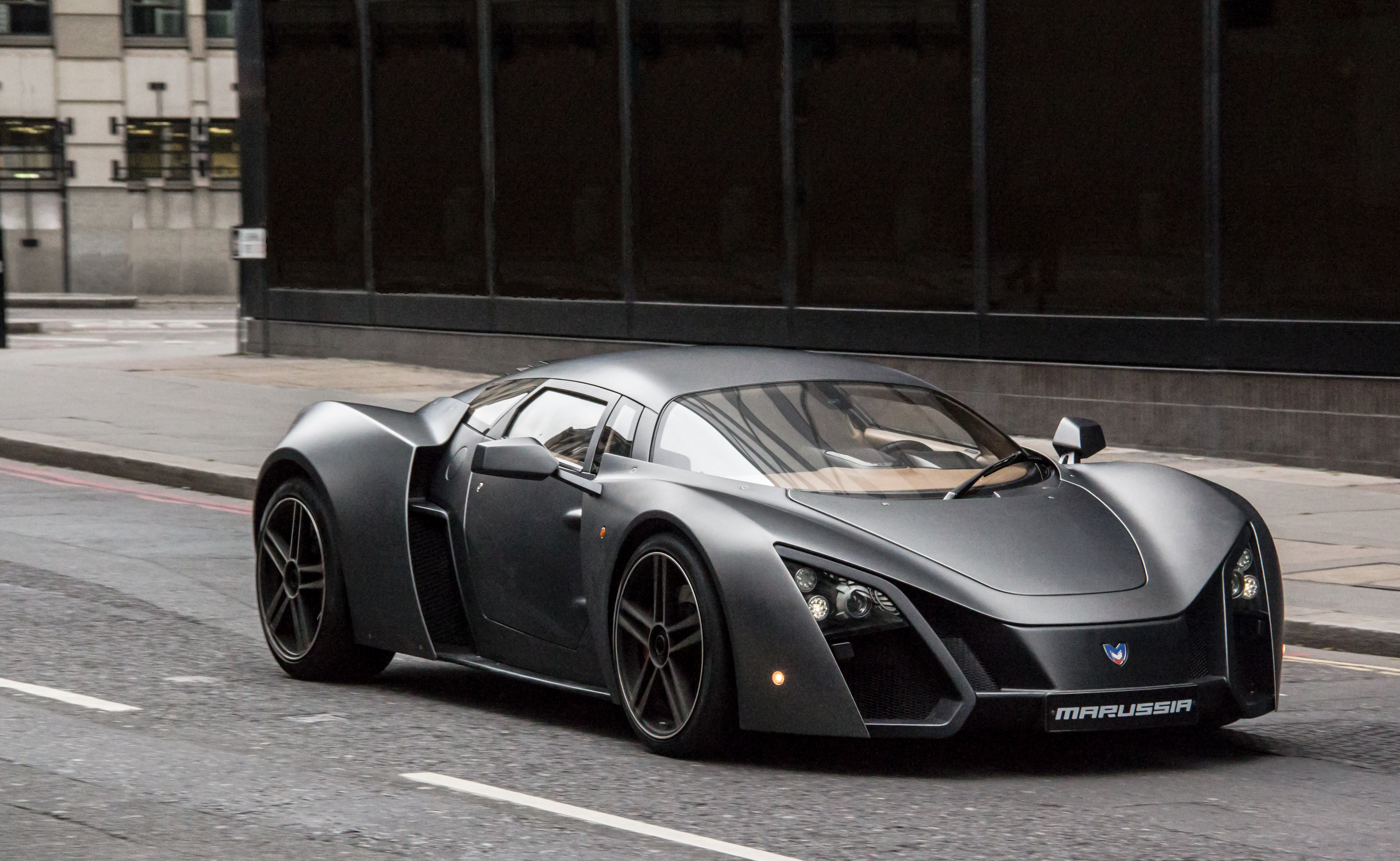
B2 on the streets of London

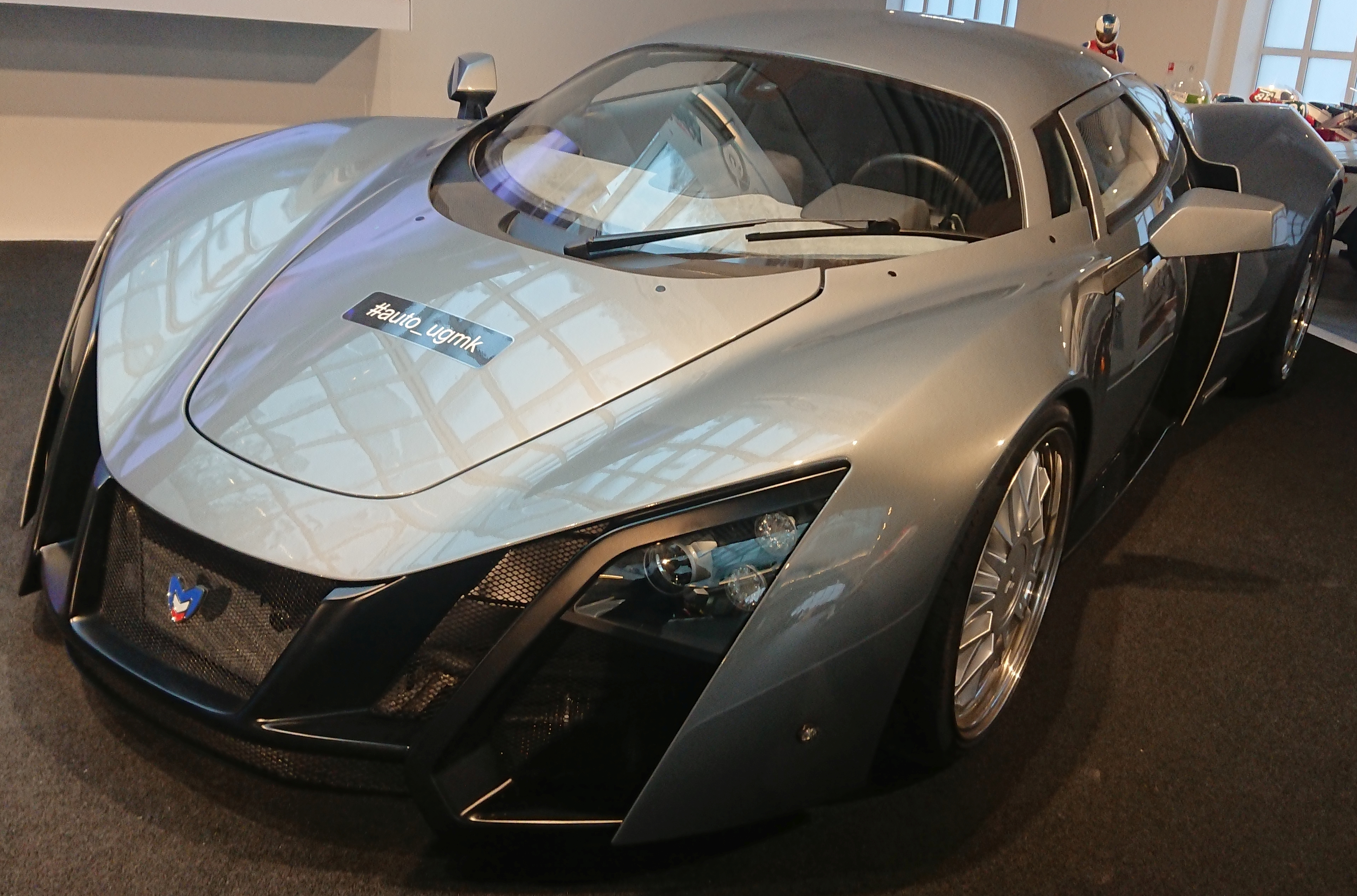
B2 in the UMMC Museum

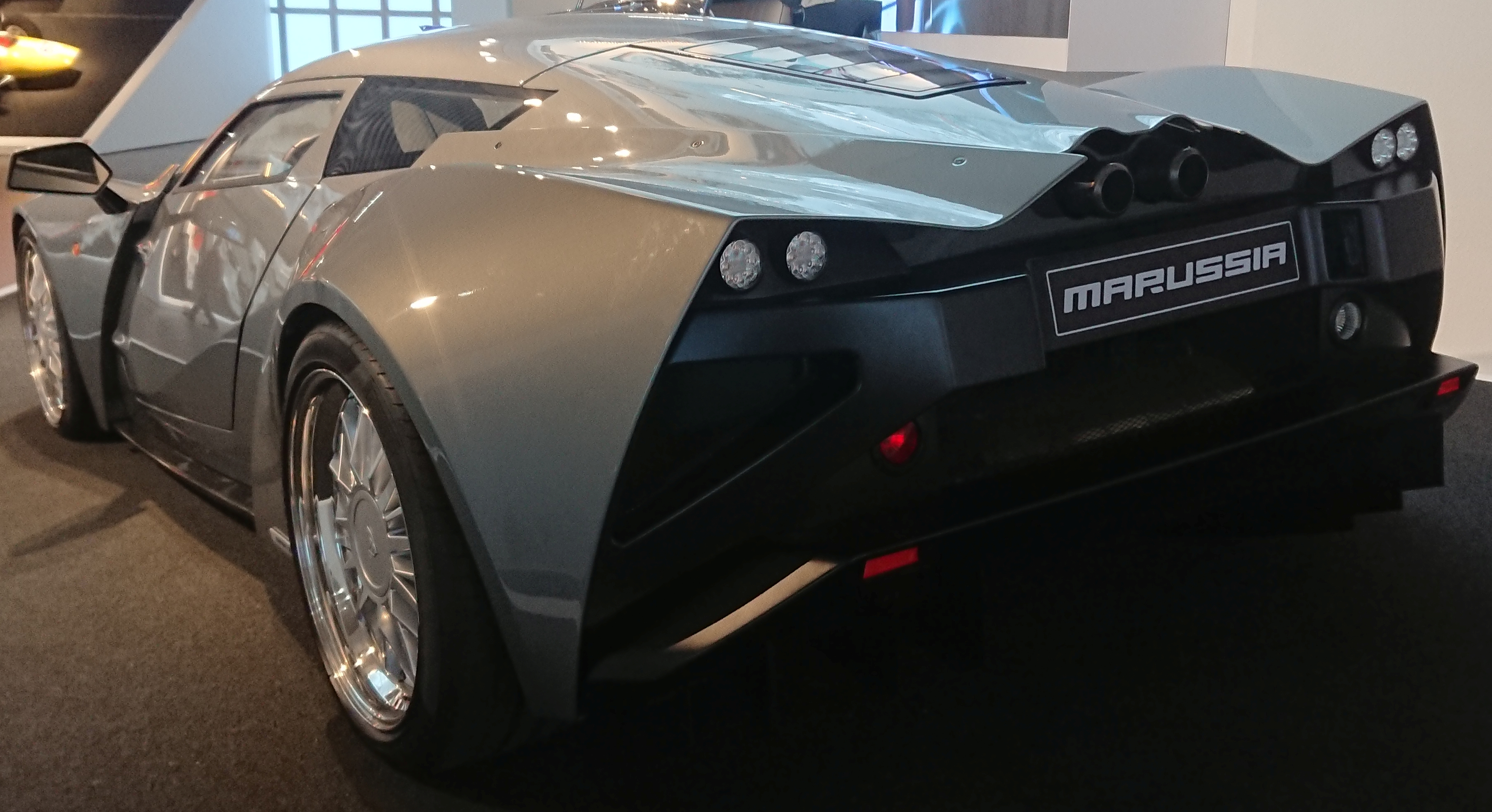
The rear of B2
