= Tomlinson Electric Vehicles =

- Industry: Battery Electric Vehicles
- Founded: mid 1930s
- Defunct: early 1961
- Fate: Hostile takeover
- Headquarters: Witney, England
- Products: Milk float
- Footnotes / references Many vehicles produced by Tomlinson were classified by their payload, which was measured in hundredweights, and this usage has been retained in the article. A hundredweight is one twentieth of a long ton or 51kg, and is abbreviated to "cwt".

Tomlinson Electric Vehicles was a British manufacturer of milk floats and other battery electric road vehicles, which also supplied vehicles to the Benelux countries. The company was formed in the mid-1930s. In 1949 they were taken over by King's Motors of Oxford, but the Tomlinson name was retained. They made a battery-electric railway locomotive in 1958, and hoped to diversify into this market, but were the subject of a hostile takeover by an asset stripping company in 1961, after which vehicle production ceased.

== History ==
A company called Tomlinson built the bodywork for two streamlined vans supplied to the West Ham Electricity Department in 1934. The bodywork was fitted to chassis manufactured by Partridge Wilson Engineering. They supplied another electric van to the East Ham Electricity Department later the same year.

A Tomlinson pedestrian controlled vehicle (PCV) and chassis were showcased by Electric Vans Ltd at an Electric Vehicle exhibition, held in Gateshead in May 1939. In 1947, they were making two types of PCVs. Four-wheeled PCVs were designated Type A, while Type B vehicles had three wheels, with the single wheel at the rear of the vehicle. Both types could be fitted with bodywork for use as a bread barrow, a milk pram or an industrial truck. The chassis were made from square section tube, with all joints welded, and were fitted with a 1.5 horsepower (1.1 kW) motor, driving the rear wheels. Batteries rated at 84, 92, 108 and 115 Amp-hours were available, giving a range of 7 to 10 miles (11 to 16 km).

As well as road vehicles, they also produced trucks for internal transport in factories. Three such trucks were displayed at the Amsterdam Motor Show in 1948, branded the universal works truck, the industrial works truck, and the Omnitruck ride-on vehicle. The vehicles were provided by Tomlinson's distributors in the Benelux countries, Autobodrijf Ten Hoove. Tomlinson-Benelux NV showed three vehicles at the Brussels Motor Show in early 1949. Again, two were pedestrian controlled vehicles, and the third was an Omnitruck. Tomlinson supplied the chassis, while bodywork was manufactured locally in Holland. The PCVs were a Roadster A6 20-cwt chassis, with a 1.5 hp (1.1 kW) motor driving the rear axle through an overhead worm drive, and a universal works truck, also rated as suitable for a payload of 20 cwt. The frame was fitted with castor wheels at each end, giving it a turning circle of just 6 feet (1.8 m). Three speeds could be selected on the Omnitruck, with the fastest being 12 mph (19 km/h).

=== Acquisition ===
The company, which was based at Witney, Oxfordshire, was taken over by King's Motors (Oxford) Ltd in mid-1949. King's Motors were well-known distributors of cars at the time, and were based in Oxford. Mr H F King, the chairman of King's Motors, stated that there was great potential in the market for both works trucks and battery-electric road vehicles, and that having acquired over 80 per cent of the shares in Tomlinson (Electric Vehicles) Ltd, they were planning to expand the business. The Tomlinson name was retained, despite the change of ownership.

Tomlinson used the 1949 Dairy Show to unveil their next new vehicle, a four-wheeled ride-on model called the Goliath. The chassis could be fitted with a variety of jig-built bodies, all of which were interchangeable, but the model displayed was a milk float. The front wheels were fitted to a short axle, with a track of just 1 foot 4 inches (0.41 m), giving it a turning circle of 25 feet (7.6 m). A 2.25 hp (1.68 kW) motor drove the rear wheels through a worm gear and differential. The motor was powered by a 30 volt 184 Amp-hour battery, which gave it a range of 15 to 25 miles (24 to 40 km) depending on usage, and a top speed of 8 to 10 miles per hour (13 to 16 km/h). To prevent unauthorised driving of the vehicle, there was an interlock switch operated by pressure on the driver's seat. With a dairy body, it could carry 90 imperial gallons (410 L), and with a bakery body, could carry around 600 loaves. Grace's Guide lists six vehicles in production by Tomlinson in 1950. These were the Roadster 5, the Roadster 6, the 75-gallon milk float, the 60-gallon milk float, a bread van and the Goliath. They also show a picture of the Model "A" PCV taken from the British Trade Journal of March 1946.

Tomlinson were listed by Commercial Motor as one of 17 companies making battery electric road vehicles in 1956 and one of 11 such companies in 1960. In 1958 they ventured into the locomotive market, supplying a diminutive 2 ft (610 mm) gauge machine to operate in a tunnel on Gibraltar. The vehicle, which was 5 feet 6 inches (1.68 m) long and 2 feet 4 inches (0.71 m) wide, could haul a load of about 2 long tons at speeds of up to 6 mph (9.7 km/h). It had a 2.25-horsepower (1.68 kW) motor, running on a 30 volt supply provided by 15 traction cells. It was designed for about 4 hours of use per day. The company announced at the time that they were thinking of marketing similar vehicles for use in mining, quarrying and general industry.

Tomlinson's appear to have been acquired by an asset stripping company in 1961, according to the Valence House Museum in Dagenham, who have the company minute book covering 1939 to 1961 in their collection.
