= Savage Rivale Roadyacht GTS =

Savage Rivale
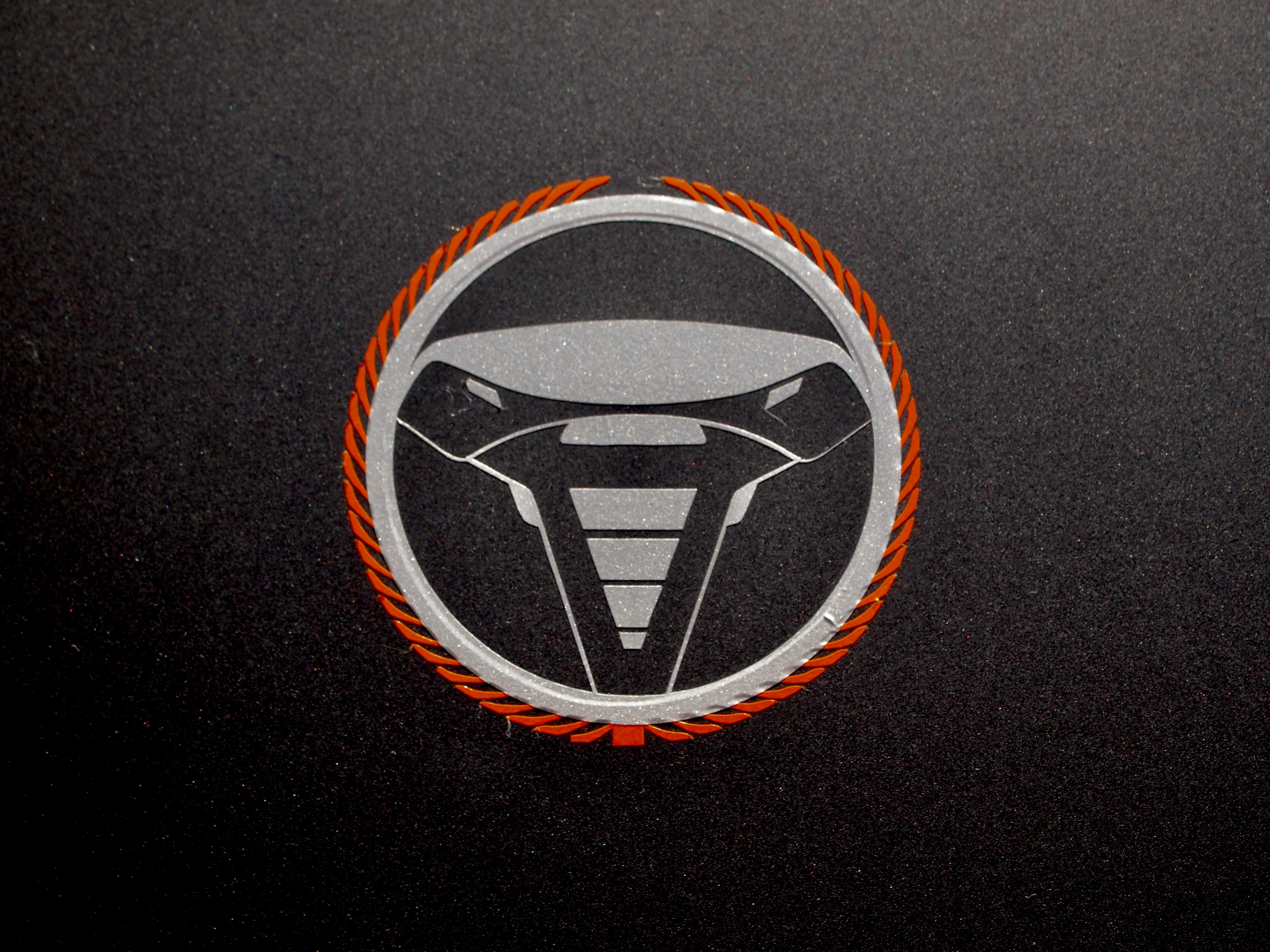
- Savage Rivale Logo used front 2009 to 2016

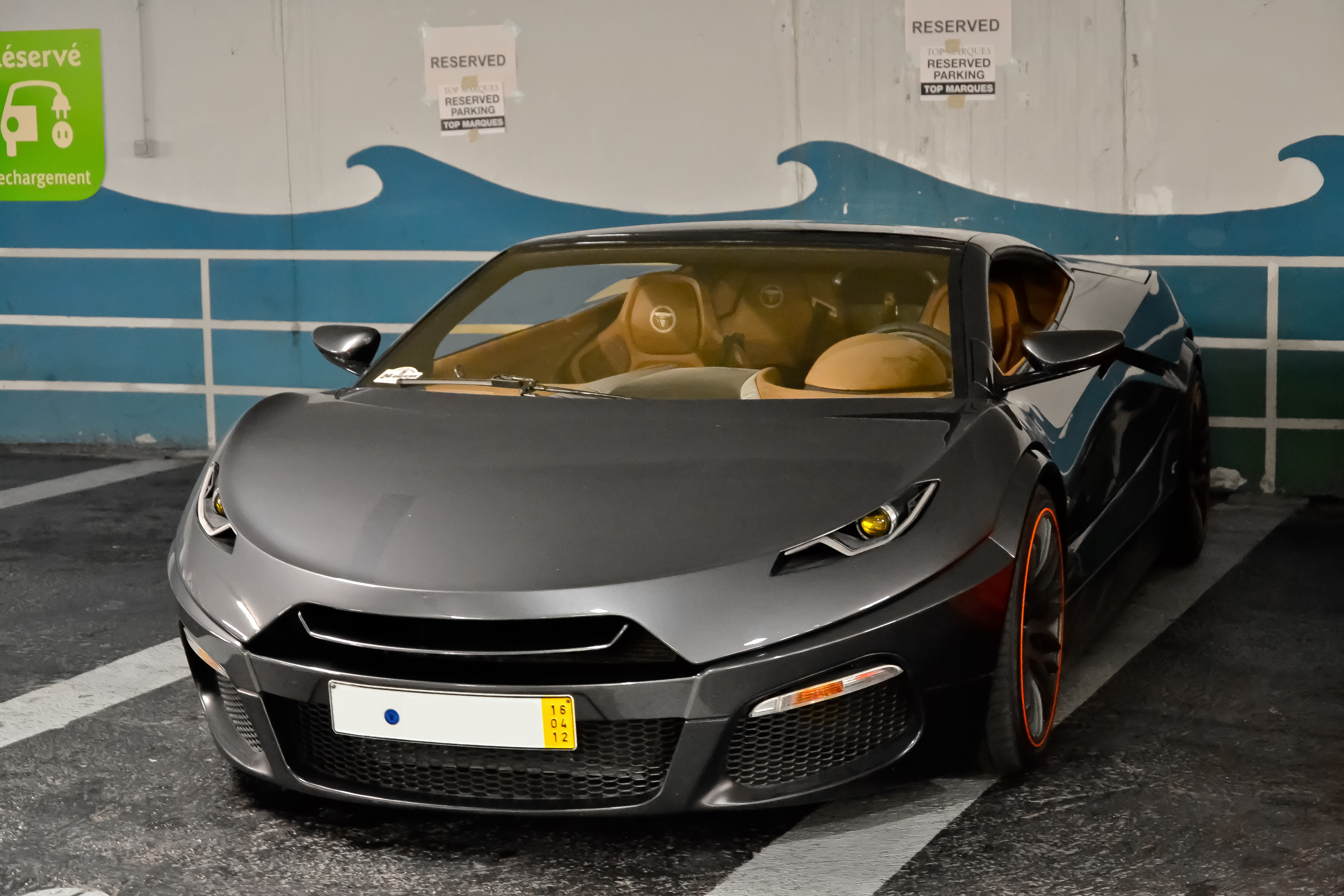
- Industry: Automotive industry
- Founded: 11 June 2009
- Defunct: 3 May 2016
- Headquarters: Rotterdam, Netherlands
- Website: https://www.savagerivale.nl

Savage Rivale Roadyacht GTS
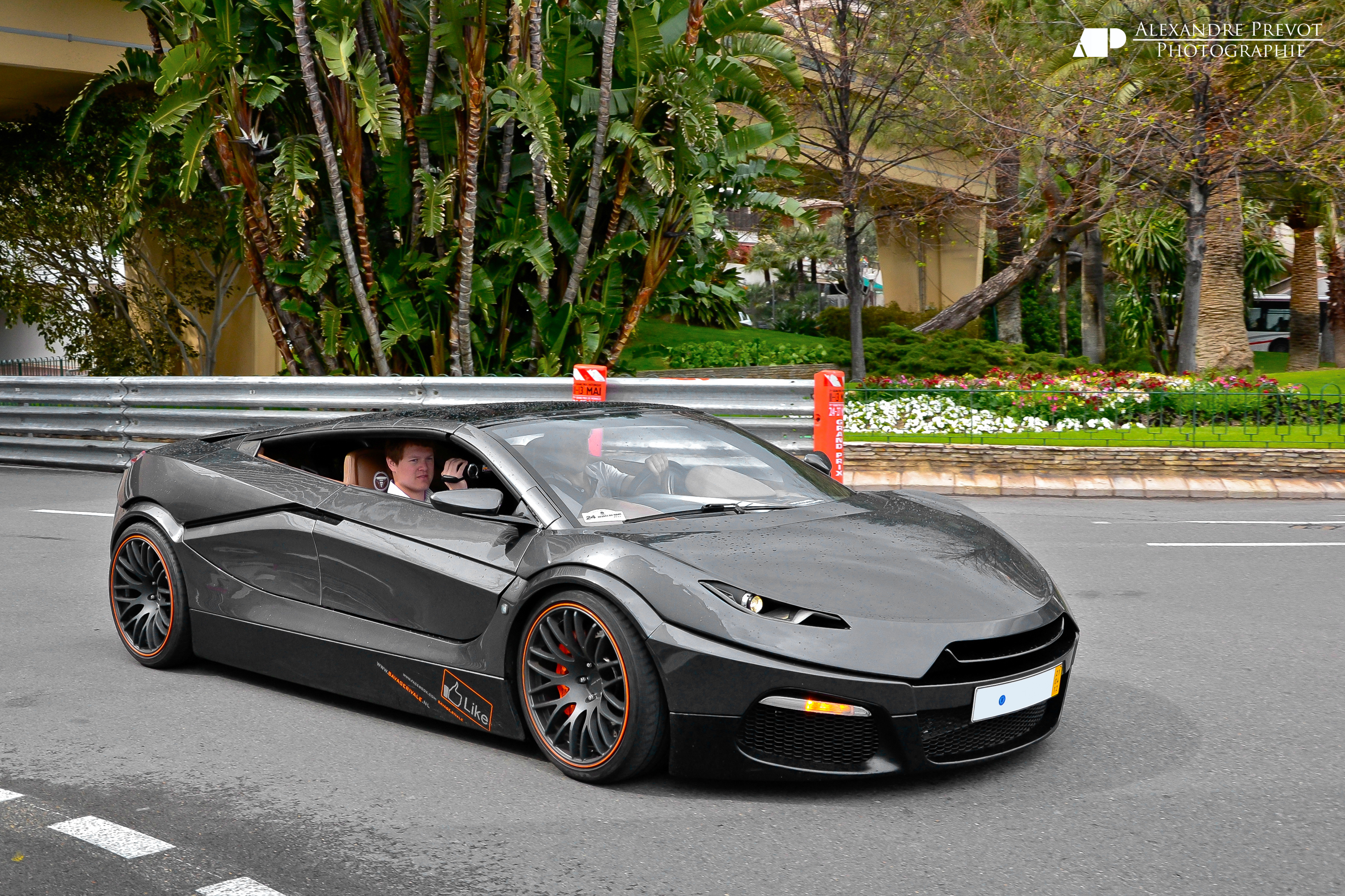

Overview
- Manufacturer: Savage Rivale
- Also called: GLM G4
- Production: 2009
- Assembly: Netherlands
- Designer: Emile Pop; Justin de Boer

Body and chassis
- Class: Grand tourer (S)
- Body style: 4-door Retractable hardtop sedan
- Layout: FMR layout
- Doors: Butterfly doors (front); Suicide butterfly doors (rear)

Powertrain
- Engine: 6.2 L GM LS9 supercharged V8 engine
- Transmission: 6-speed semi-automatic transmission

Dimensions
- Wheelbase: 2,700 mm (106.3 in)
- Length: 4,530 mm (178.3 in)
- Width: 1,998 mm (78.7 in)
- Height: 1,156 mm (45.5 in)
- Kerb weight: 1,280 kg (2,822 lb)

The Savage Rivale Roadyacht GTS is a sports car by Savage Rivale built in 2009.

== Development ==
The car was presented for the first time at the Top Marques in Montecarlo, was created by two Dutch students, Emile Pop and Justin de Boer. Production was limited to 20 units.

== Specifications ==
The Roadyacht GTS is equipped with a V8 engine derived from the Chevrolet Corvette ZR1 that produces 670 hp (500 kW; 679 PS) and 730 N⋅m (538 lb⋅ft) of torque. This allows for acceleration from 0 to 100 km/h (0-62 mph) in 3.4 seconds, with a top speed of 330 km/h (205 mph). Despite the ballast embarked to compensate for some features of the vehicle (such as the absence of the fixed roof and the presence of four doors), the Roadster GTS had a total weight of 1,280 kg (2,822 lb). The retractable roof, activated by an electric control, was made of glass panels reinforced with carbon fiber and had a multi-panel telescopic configuration that allowed it to close thanks to the overlapping of the panels in the boot.

== Savage Rivale GTR ==
The Racing version of this car named Savage Rivale Roadyacht GTR which unveiled in 2011.

== Media ==
The Roadyacht GTS & Rivale GTR is featured in video games: Driveclub, Asphalt 8: Airborne & GT Racing 2: The Real Car Experience.

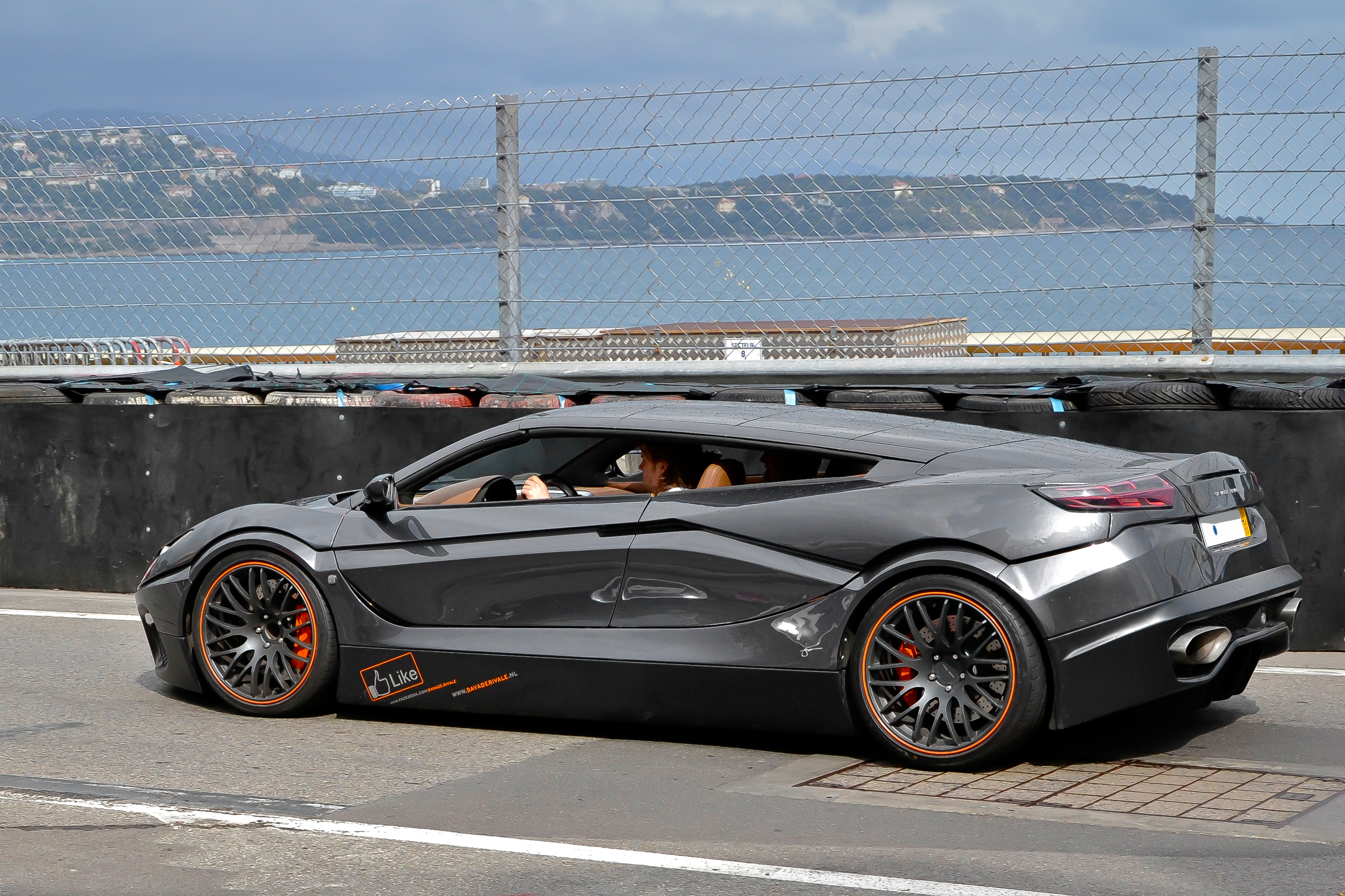
Rear view

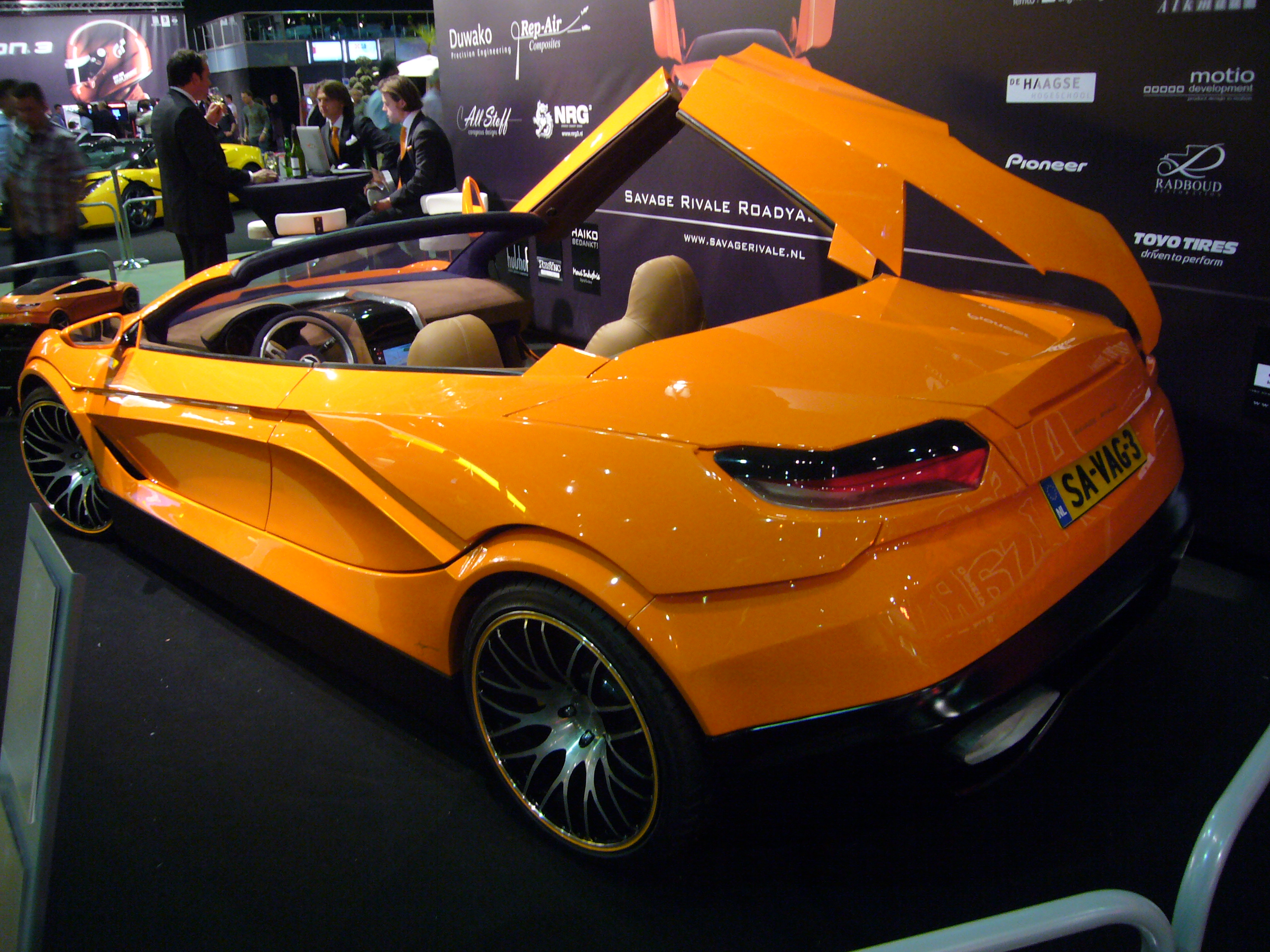
Rear view with the right side doors open

== Other models ==
=== Coastrunner EV ===
The Coastrunner EV is an electric buggy designed by Savage Rivale, the Dutch brand behind the 2009 Roadyacht GTS sports car and Mirage 18GT yacht. It looks like a doorless SUV with an open-air cabin and a ground clearance of 215 mm (8.5 in).
