= Tomlinson D. Todd =

Tomlinson D. Todd (died 1987) was an American civil rights activist based in Washington, D.C. He was the acting director for the Institute on Race from 1941 to 1951, and the creator/host of the radio program "American All". The program focused on education reform and implementing strategies for political empowerment.

== Early life ==
Although Tomlinson was born in Reading, Pennsylvania, he was raised in Washington, D.C.

== Career ==
Tomlinson was credited for bringing many issues to light. He worked to bring an end to segregation and the Jim Crow laws through non-violent demonstrations. His work as president-elect of the Institute on Race led him to discover laws from 1872 (entitled "Lost Laws"). These laws made it legal for restaurants and other public spaces to discriminate against African Americans after the Civil War. Upon discovery of these issues, they were addressed and segregation soon ended for restaurants in the 1950s.

== Later life ==
Later in life, Tomlinson served the Washington, D.C. community as a teacher for driver education. He died at the age of 76.
