= Opel Tech 1 =

Opel Tech 1 Concept
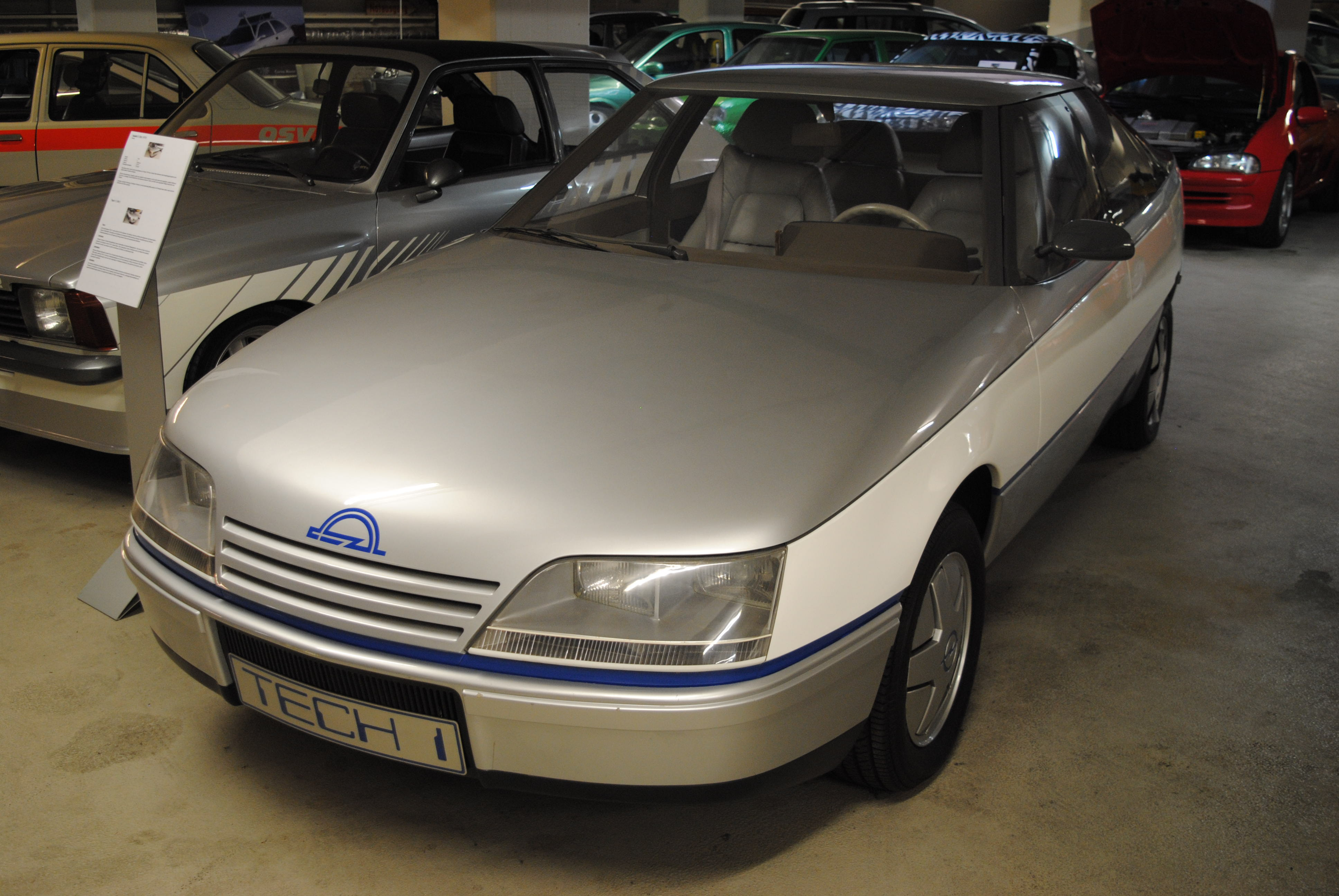

Overview
- Type: Concept car
- Manufacturer: Opel
- Production: 1981 (Concept car)

Body and chassis
- Body style: 5-door hatchback
- Layout: Transverse front-engine, front-wheel drive
- Platform: T Platform

Chronology
- Predecessor: 1979 Opel Kadett (D)
- Successor: 1985 Opel Kadett (E)

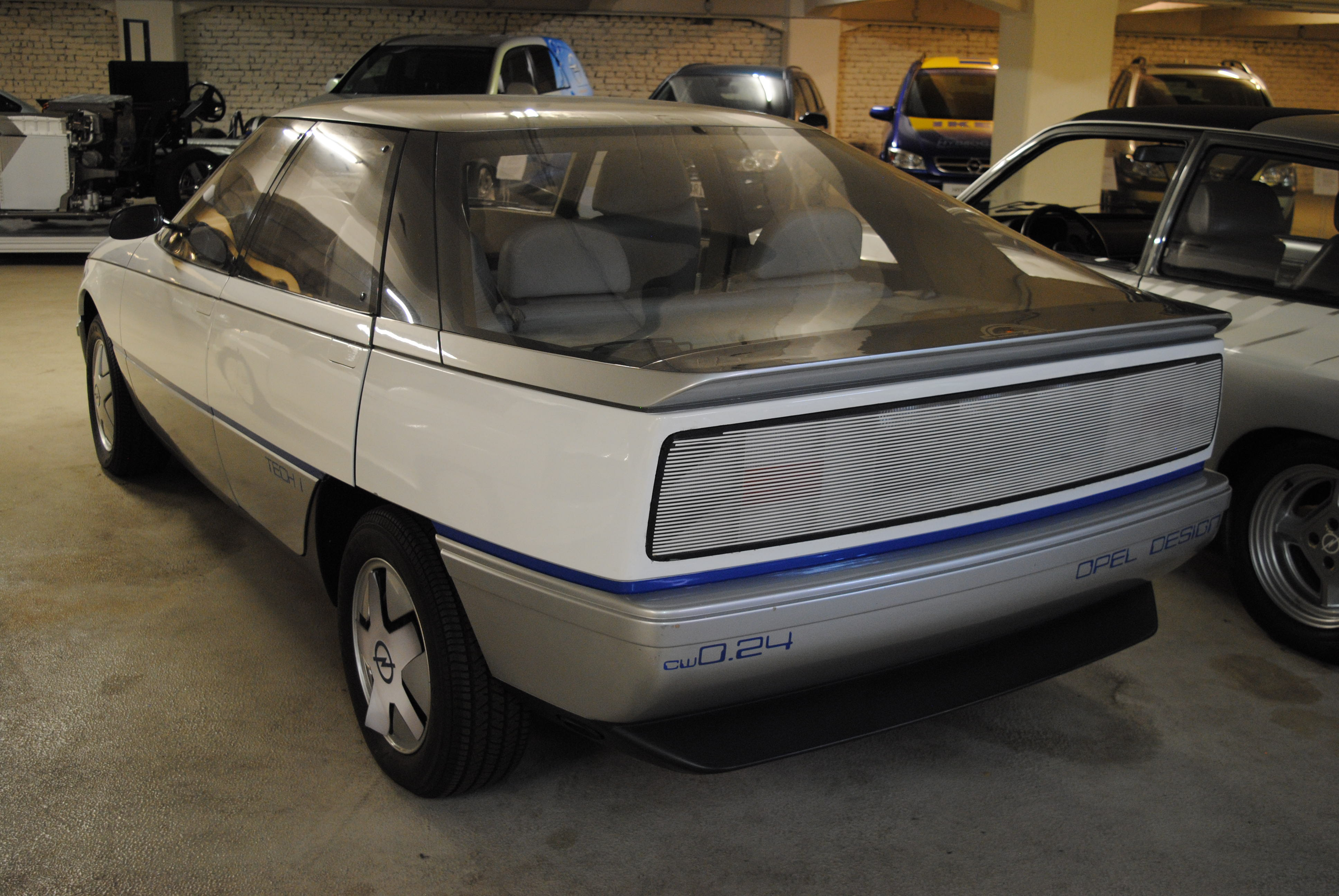
Rear view

The Opel Tech 1 Concept was a research vehicle and concept car developed by Opel, which was a subsidiary of General Motors at the time. It was exhibited at the 1981 International Motor Show Germany (IAA) in Frankfurt. The car was based on the fourth-generation Opel Kadett D and used the platform, which was called the T Car. The vehicle was designed by Erhard Schnell and foreshadowed some of the design aspects found on production Opel/Vauxhall cars released throughout the 1980s.

== Body ==
The design targeted a peak of aerodynamics and reached a drag coefficient of 0.235 c_{w} thanks in part to a panoramic windshield. Some of the car's aerodynamic features made it into production form on both the 1984 Opel Kadett E and the 1986 Opel Omega – most evidently its front-end styling. The Tech 1's wheel design entered into mass production as an alloy wheel option on top-spec models of the Opel Rekord E2/Vauxhall Carlton.

== Interior ==
All controls were push buttons; only the steering wheel, gear lever and foot controls were conventional.
