= Tommy Tomlinson (footballer) =

English footballer

Personal information
- Full name: Thomas Tomlinson
- Date of birth: 1887
- Place of birth: Chesterfield, England
- Position: Winger

Senior career*
Years	Team	Apps	(Gls)
1905–1906	Newbold United		
1906–1907	Birdholme Rovers		
1907–1908	Chesterfield Town	18	(5)
1908	Worksop Town		
1908–1909	Chesterfield Town	0	(0)
1909–1910	Bradford (Park Avenue)	4	(4)
1910–1912	Mexborough Town		
1912–1913	Notts County	7	(0)
1913	Newport County		
Total		29	(9)
- * Club domestic league appearances and goals

Thomas Tomlinson (1887–unknown) was an English footballer who played in the Football League for Bradford (Park Avenue), Chesterfield Town and Notts County.
