= John Tomlinson =

John Tomlinson may refer to:

- John D. Tomlinson (1929–1992), American politician and businessman
- John Tomlinson (footballer) (1934–2014), English footballer
- John Tomlinson (educationalist) (1932–2005), British educationalist
- Sir John Tomlinson (bass) (born 1946), English opera singer
- John Tomlinson, Baron Tomlinson (1939–2024), Lord Tomlinson of Walsall, former MP and MEP
- John Tomlinson (comics), comics writer for 2000 AD
- John Tomlinson (cricketer) (1926–2010), cricketer
- John Tomlinson (football coach) (1910–2000), known as Ike
- John Tomlinson (sport shooter) (born 1933), British Olympic shooter
- John Tomlinson, the claimant in the tort case of Tomlinson v Congleton BC

== See also ==
- Jon Tomlinson (born 1973), aerodynamaticist
- John Thomlinson (1692–1761), English diarist
