= Tomlinson Fort =

Tomlinson Fort may refer to:

- Tomlinson Fort (congressman) (1787–1859), United States Representative from Georgia
- Tomlinson Fort (mayor) (1839–1910), mayor of Chattanooga, Tennessee, 1876
- Tomlinson Fort (judge) (1870–1930), Justice of the New Mexico Supreme Court
- Tomlinson Fort Jr. (1932–2012), professor of chemical engineering
