= Driveclub =

2014 video game

- Official box art featuring a Marussia B2
- Developer: Evolution Studios
- Publisher: Sony Computer Entertainment
- Directors: Paul Rustchynsky; Col Rodgers
- Producer: Nadia Ankrah
- Designer: Simon Barlow
- Programmers: Kieran D'Archambaud; Scott Kirkland
- Artist: Alex Perkins
- Composer: Hybrid
- Platform: PlayStation 4
- Release: NA: 7 October 2014; EU: 8 October 2014; UK: 10 October 2014
- Genre: Racing
- Modes: Single-player, multiplayer

Driveclub (Note: (stylised as DRIVECLUB and sometimes stylised as #DRIVECLUB)) is a 2014 racing video game developed by Evolution Studios and published by Sony Computer Entertainment for the PlayStation 4. It was announced during the PlayStation 4 press conference on 20 February 2013, and, after several delays, was released worldwide in October 2014.

Driveclub is a racing game in which players compete in racing events around the world in a variety of different fashions. Players can compete in clubs with other players, earning a reputation as one of the best clubs, and levelling up to unlock better items. Another game mode is tour, essentially a campaign mode. Players can compete in standard races, as well as time trials, by drifting events, and championship tournaments, with a variety of routes located in places around the world. Players may customize their car, their club, or their driver, and may complete optional challenges during events. The game also features a dynamic weather system and a day-night cycle, available via a post-launch update.

Driveclub was released to a fairly mixed critical reception. Critics praised the photorealistic visuals, sound design, and the controls, but criticized the online playability, the inconsistent AI and a lack of gameplay variety. As of July 2015, the game has reached 2 million copies sold, becoming one of the best-selling PlayStation 4 video games. The online servers for Driveclub were shut down on 31 March 2020 and the game was made unavailable for purchase.

== Gameplay ==
Driveclub is a racing game in which players compete in races around the world in several different game modes. A major focus of the game is the club aspect. Players may join a club or create their own and will compete against other clubs to ultimately see whose club is the best. Clubs consist of up to six players. Players complete challenges together representing their club and earn fame and XP. The player earns fame by driving well and completing challenges. Fame determines the player's level as well as the club level. As the player levels up, they automatically unlock items, such as new vehicles, accolades, or colour schemes. Every team member's action contributes to the club's overall success.

The game's tracks and environments are inspired by actual places in diverse regions throughout the globe, such as Norway and India (Tamil Nadu). Driveclub features dynamic weather system such as rain and snowfall and a day-night cycle. Each rain drop has realistic behaviour.

There are three main game modes in Driveclub; tour, single event and multiplayer. Tour is a campaign mode where single-player events set in various locations can be played using the allocated cars. A set of objectives are present and can be tackled during the events. In the single event game mode, players choose what event they would like to play (drift, sprint, race or time trial) and have the freedom to select the location, weather and other options. The multiplayer game mode revolves around competition and co-operation with real life players. Players can complete challenges with social leaderboards, play with clubs, and play online races. There are a total of 50 cars available initially, as well as over 60 more cars that can be downloaded from the PlayStation Store for free or with a charge. The cars are split into five categories based on their in-game stats: hot hatch, sports, performance, super and hyper. Each car can be customized with paintjobs and stickers.

== Development ==
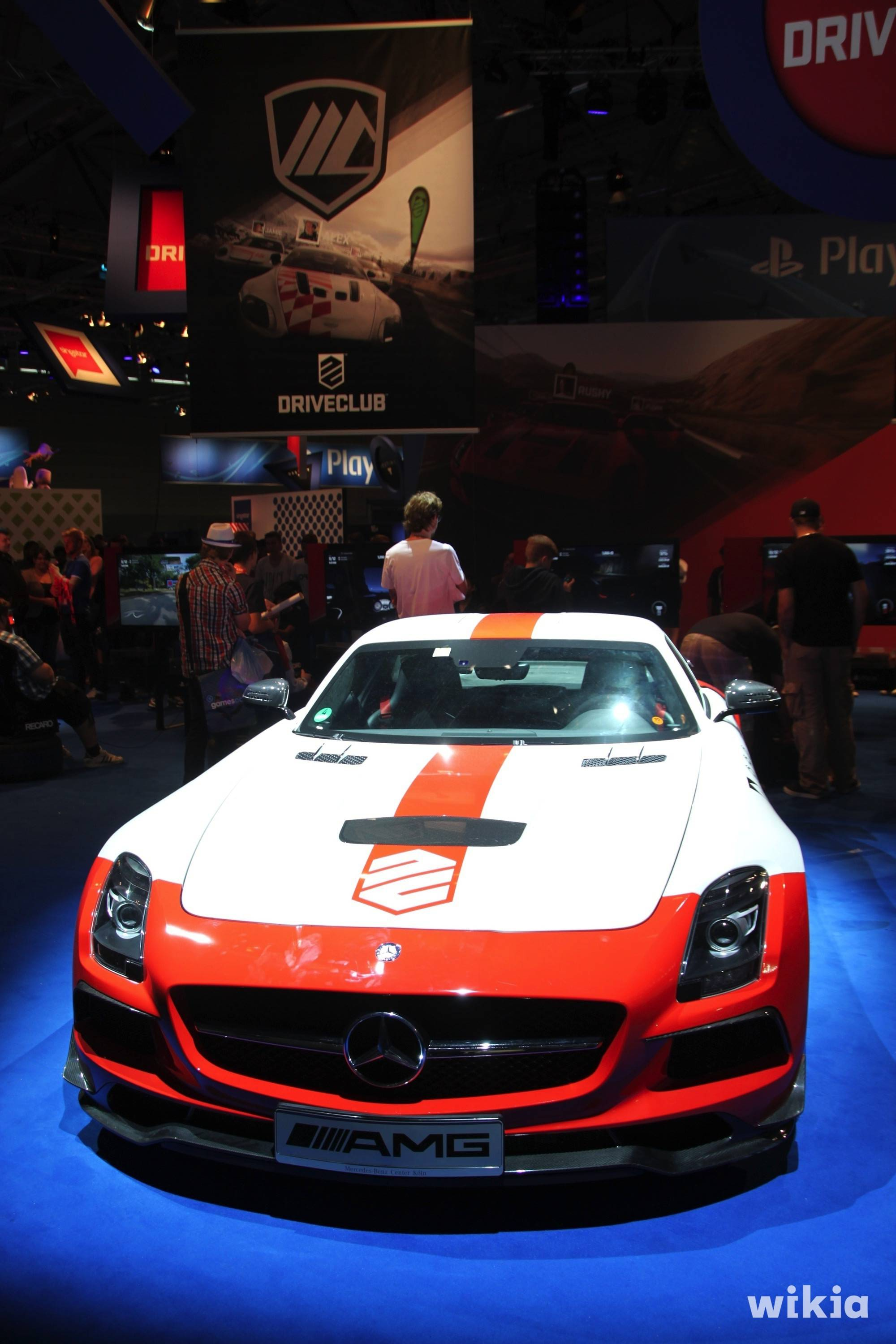
Promotion at Gamescom 2014

On 18 October 2013, Sony Computer Entertainment announced that Driveclub would be delayed until early 2014. In a statement posted on the PlayStation Blog, the company wrote that, "SCE Worldwide Studios and the team at Evolution Studios have made the difficult decision to delay the release of Driveclub and Driveclub PlayStation Plus Edition until early 2014." Sony Worldwide Studios boss Shuhei Yoshida stated: "Driveclub will be a truly innovative, socially connected racing game, but the team requires more time in order to deliver on their vision – and I'm fully confident the game will surpass your expectations."

On 10 March 2014, PlayStation Software Product Development Head Scott Rohde mentioned that the title has met further delays with the following statement: "What I will say is that it all comes back to that fundamental principle, and that’s that we want to build great games, and we really don't want to release a game before it's ready." Rohde or any other Sony representative could not at the time give a more specific release date but hinted that it might take a while referring to that the game has "gone back to the drawing board".

Although Evolution Studios did experiment with Sony's Project Morpheus, the final game does not support virtual reality.

In April 2014, game director Paul Rustchynsky stated that the delay was caused by the game's "dynamic menu". This menu allows players to quickly navigate from menu to menu, join clubs, race, and perform many other activities within the game.

In early September 2014, Evolution Studios announced a downloadable content (DLC) Season Pass. The pass introduces 11 new courses, 23 new events, and a new car every month until June 2015 (later extended to July 2015). The DLC is both paid, and free.

Cars in the game contain an average of 260,000 polygons. Before release, Evolution Studios had confirmed that Driveclub runs at resolution of 1080p and would be capped at 30 frames per second.

=== Post-release updates ===
Driveclub launched in North America on 7 October 2014, Europe on 8 October 2014, and the United Kingdom on 10 October 2014. However, the game suffered from severe online connection issues at launch. Evolution Studios had released the first premium DLC packs (Ignition Expansion Pack and Photo-Finish Tour Pack) for free to affected players in November. PlayStation UK executive Fergal Gara apologized for the marred launch of the game.

On 8 December 2014, Sony released a weather patch which added dynamic weather to the game. The feature was delayed up to two months after launch to include all improvements to the weather that the developers had wanted.

In January 2015, Evolution Studios released a new patch that brought several new features to the game, with the highlight of the patch being the introduction of Japan. A total of five tracks were added, including Lake Shoji and Nakasendo.

On 1 April 2015, as a tribute to the MotorStorm racing game series, Evolution Studios released a free special DLC pack containing the Wombat Typhoon from the very game series.

On 22 March 2016, Evolution released their final DLC pack for the game, "Finish Line", which includes events named "Clocking Off" and "The Long Goodbye". On that same day, Sony announced that Evolution would be shut down. Subsequent updates for the game would be created by other Sony studios. These updates included the game's first city circuit, Old Town in Scotland (along with six route variations), and Hardcore handling physics, available via Patch 1.26 on 11 February 2016, and five more city circuits (one in each country of location), all of which first appeared in Driveclub VR, added to the game via Patch 1.28 on 31 October 2016.

Sony Interactive Entertainment announced that online services for Driveclub would be terminated on 31 March 2020, meaning that players can no longer access the online features from that date onwards. The game, along with its DLC packs and standalone expansions, was removed from the PlayStation Store on 29 August 2019.

=== PlayStation Plus Edition ===
Driveclub: PlayStation Plus Edition was a version of the game that was available for free to PlayStation Plus subscribers. It came with all the game modes and online capabilities of the paid version, but had a limited number of cars and locations available to the player. The PlayStation Plus Edition was originally set to be released on the same date as the full version of Driveclub, but was delayed to ease the load and traffic to the servers. On 31 October 2014, Sony announced that the PlayStation Plus Edition would be postponed until further notice. The Edition was released on 25 June 2015, but has since been removed as of 6 October 2015.

=== Driveclub Bikes ===
Driveclub Bikes is a standalone expansion for Driveclub and was released on 27 October 2015. The expansion focuses on "superbike racing", and features a new Tour, a new gameplay mode, new challenges and new events. Similar to the main game, the motorbike and the rider can be customized, and the player's result in each race changes the reputation of their club. The game itself contains 12 bikes initially, including the KTM 1190 RC8R and Superbike World Championship motorcycles such as the Yamaha YZF-R1 and the Honda CBR1000RR. There are also 8 bikes available through free update or paid DLC packs.

=== Driveclub VR ===
Driveclub VR is a virtual reality version of the original PS4 exclusive game, Driveclub, compatible with PlayStation VR. It contains almost all the assets from the full game, with a total of 80 cars and 84 tracks, reworked for VR, with full 360 view of the interior and all views, while introducing five new city circuits. It was released on 13 October 2016 as one of launch titles of PlayStation VR for Japan. This game is essentially a standalone expansion, with its own separate save file and stats, but does not feature online leaderboards.

== Soundtrack ==
Driveclub Original Soundtrack

Soundtrack album by Hybrid
- Released: 7 October 2014
- Recorded: 2013–14
- Genres: Electronica, trip hop, breakbeat, progressive trance, drum and bass, big beat
- Length: 2:03:14
- Producers: Mike Truman, Chris Healings, Charlotte James

Hybrid soundtrack chronology
| Dead in Tombstone (2013) | Driveclub Original Soundtrack (2014) | Vice (2015) |

The official soundtrack for the game was composed and produced by Hybrid. The soundtrack was released on iTunes on 7 October 2014, and also includes remixes by Elite Force, The Qemists, Noisia, DJ Shadow, Black Sun Empire and Fred V & Grafix.

The in-game music is turned off by default. This is done to place emphasis on the sound design of the cars.

Driveclub Original Soundtrack
| No. | Title | Remixer(s) | Length |
|---|---|---|---|
| 1. | "Be Here Now" | - | 4:57 |
| 2. | "All Torque" | - | 4:48 |
| 3. | "Tunnel Vision" | - | 4:48 |
| 4. | "Power Curve" | - | 4:51 |
| 5. | "The Club Rules" | - | 4:26 |
| 6. | "Be Here Now" | Hybrid | 4:28 |
| 7. | "All Torque" | Hybrid | 4:31 |
| 8. | "Tunnel Vision" | Hybrid | 4:45 |
| 9. | "Power Curve" | Hybrid | 4:35 |
| 10. | "The Club Rules" | Hybrid | 4:23 |
| 11. | "Be Here Now" | Alex Banks | 4:55 |
| 12. | "All Torque" | Black Sun Empire | 4:33 |
| 13. | "Power Curve" | Clark | 5:14 |
| 14. | "Power Curve" | DJ Shadow & Bleep Bloop | 4:47 |
| 15. | "All Torque" | Elite Force | 4:17 |
| 16. | "All Torque" | F Buttons | 5:10 |
| 17. | "Be Here Now" | Fred V & Grafix | 4:12 |
| 18. | "The Club Rules" | Kilon Tek (Remix 1) | 3:52 |
| 19. | "The Club Rules" | Kilon Tek (Remix 2) | 4:42 |
| 20. | "Power Curve" | Noisia (Driveclub™ Remix) | 4:46 |
| 21. | "Tunnel Vision" | Photek | 4:42 |
| 22. | "Be Here Now" | Qemists | 4:06 |
| 23. | "All Torque" | Raffertie | 4:05 |
| 24. | "All Torque" | Second Storey | 5:32 |
| 25. | "Power Curve" | Segal | 4:02 |
| 26. | "Tunnel Vision" | Xcalibr | 4:26 |
| 27. | "Be Here Now (Radio Edit)" | - | 3:21 |
| Total length: | | | 123:14 |

== Reception ==
=== Critical response ===
Reception

Aggregate score
| Aggregator | Score |
|---|---|
| Metacritic | 71/100 |

Review scores
| Publication | Score |
|---|---|
| Computer and Video Games | 8/10 |
| Destructoid | 7.5/10 |
| Edge | 7/10 |
| Eurogamer | 6/10 |
| Game Informer | 7.75/10 |
| GameRevolution | 3/5 |
| GameSpot | 5/10 |
| GamesRadar+ | 4.5/5 |
| GameTrailers | 8.6/10 |
| Giant Bomb | 2/5 |
| IGN | 7.9/10 |
| Joystiq | 3/5 |
| Play | 77% |
| Polygon | 7.5/10 |
| VideoGamer.com | 8/10 |

Driveclub received "mixed or average" reviews from critics, according to review aggregator Metacritic. The game gained a final overall score of 71 on the website.

Justin Towell from GamesRadar gave the game an 8/10, praising its challenge system, accessible handling and beginner-friendly gameplay, saying "it's a big deal for a modern racing game to have enough faith in its core handling to eschew driving assists." He criticized the weak damage and characterized crashes as unsatisfying. He also discouraged playing unconnected, adding "Never have I seen such a dull, lifeless and formulaic single-player mode transformed so spectacularly by online connectivity." Dale North from Destructoid gave the game a 7.5/10, praising its responsive, satisfying control and impressive sounds, as well as highly detailed environments, while criticizing the lack of replay value, overly aggressive AI drivers in single-player, and visual bugs in the in-car views. He summarized the game as having "enough to offer over other new and upcoming racing alternatives out there."

Ludwig Kietzmann of Joystiq also praised the environments and sound design. However, he also criticized the repeated attacks by AI cars, opining that they ruin the single-player experience, and the lack of difficulty options. Luke Reilly of IGN gave the game a 7.9/10, describing it as "the best-looking racing game ever seen on a console", but also criticized the AI drivers, and the difficult drifting when compared to the accessible handling. He summarized the game as "a modest, conventional arcade racer rather than the sprawling, open-world types we commonly see today". John Robertson from Computer and Video Games gave the game an 8/10, also praising its graphics and the Clubs system, but criticizing the lack of variety in race types and challenges, as well as the arcade handling, stating it "sits at odds with the purity of available events".

GameSpot's Kevin VanOrd gave the game a 5/10. While praising the graphics, in particular the cars and tracks on offer, he criticized the soundtrack and the overall presentation of the game. calling the environments and surroundings "as lifeless as postcards". Giant Bomb's Jeff Gerstmann gave the game a 2/5, praising its leaderboards, lighting and graphics, but criticizing the confusing menu, overly mechanical AI drivers, weirdly grippy car handling and lack of fun element. He characterised the game as "a weird throwback to the old, dark days of console driving games".

Post launch, Evolution Studios continued to support their game with 18 months of free content updates and an extensive DLC Season Pass and as a result GamesRadar re-reviewed the game, revising their score to 4.5/5. After the sudden closure of developer Evolution Studios on 22 March 2016, GamesRadar also published an article arguing that the studio was failed by 'public perception' after Driveclub's rocky launch, and lauded the game's current state, calling its post-release content updates "arguably the finest collection of post-release content gaming has ever seen," in particular praising the game's photo mode, and new wet weather and heat haze effects.

Following the game's final update on 31 October 2016, which added 15 new tracks and reversed variants from Driveclub VR, Eurogamer and VideoGamer.com published retrospectives on the game, hailing its quality improvements post-release. Eurogamer called it "the PS4 launch disaster that became a racing great", whilst VideoGamer called it "an exhilarating, gorgeous, feature rich, and addictive racer that will likely be looked back on as one of this generation's finest games".

During the 20th Annual D.I.C.E. Awards, the Academy of Interactive Arts & Sciences nominated Driveclub VR for "Racing Game of the Year".

=== Sales ===
Driveclub has sold over 2 million copies as of 31 July 2015.
