= John Thomlinson =

John Thomlinson (1692–1761) was an English clergyman best known for his diary, covering 1715 to 1722.

== Life ==
Thomlinson was born in the small farming village of Blencogo, near Wigton, Cumberland, on 29 September 1692, the eldest son of William Thomlinson (1657–1743). He was educated at Appleby-in-Westmorland and at St John's College, Cambridge, matriculating in 1709. Ordained a deacon in 1717, he obtained a curacy at Rothbury, Northumberland to one of his uncles, also John Thomlinson (1651–1720), who was rector there. He remained at Rothbury after his uncle's death in 1720, and in 1721, for unknown reasons, he moved to Navestock, Essex. The following year he was appointed rector of Glenfield, Leicestershire, doubtless thanks to his marriage to Catherine Winstanley, the daughter of his patron, James Winstanley of Braunston, Rutland. Thomlinson held this post until his death in Glenfield on 5 February 1761.

== The Diary ==
The diary was started in 1715 while Thomlinson was at Cambridge, and before he took orders. He continued writing it until at least 1722, with several undated entries at the end, from which we learn that he is married, although no record of the marriage can be found: his wife is known only through monumental inscriptions.

Written in the volume in an eighteenth-century hand is a comment which includes a brief description: [The Diary] affords a lively picture of the sordid and selfish views of the writer and of his friends for his advancement, in seeking for a rich wife, and the shameless traffic and trifling with the feelings of many women in this pursuit. Ponsonby writes of the diary: This is an instance of a diary which, however unpleasing it may be, is quite spontaneous and honest and therefore portrays the character of the writer more vividly than letters or second-hand observations of others could do. Indeed, this is one of the most captivating, but little-known diaries of the period, rich in antiquarian and literary interest. Thomlinson does not hesitate to criticize his subjects, and reports scandals together with curious and humorous anecdotes, including what is certainly one of the earliest limericks.

Much of the diary is concerned with the writer's matrimonial concerns, the amount of dowries as much as the characters of the women in question.

The original manuscript is now in the British Library. Much of the text has been published by the Surtees Society.
