= List of GP2 Series driver records =

This is a list of driver records in the GP2 Series, from 2005 to 2016. This list does not count results in the sister GP2 Asia Series. This list is accurate up to the 2016 final round. It does not include data from the non-championship races held in 2011.

== Wins ==
=== Total wins ===
	Driver	Seasons	Wins
1	(Belgium) Stoffel Vandoorne	2014–2015	11
2	(Venezuela) Pastor Maldonado	2007–2010	10
3	(Italy) Giorgio Pantano	2005–2008	9
3	(France) Romain Grosjean	2008–2011	9
5	(Germany) Timo Glock	2006–2007	7
5	(Italy) Davide Valsecchi	2008–2012	7
5	(Monaco) Stefano Coletti	2009, 2011–2014	7
5	(United Kingdom) Jolyon Palmer	2011–2014	7
9	(Italy) Luca Filippi	2006–2012	6
9	(United Kingdom) Sam Bird	2010–2011, 2013	6

=== Most consecutive wins ===
	Driver	Season	Wins	Consecutive races won
1	(United Kingdom) Lewis Hamilton	2006	3	Monaco Feature–Silverstone Sprint
1	(Brazil) Nelson Piquet Jr.	2006	3	Hungaroring Feature–Istanbul Park Feature
1	(Germany) Nico Hülkenberg	2009	3	Nürburgring Feature–Hungaroring Feature
1	(Italy) Davide Valsecchi	2012	3	Bahrain 1 Feature–Bahrain 2 Feature
5	(Germany) Nico Rosberg	2005	2	Magny-Cours Sprint–Silverstone Feature
5	(France) Alexandre Prémat	2005	2	Hungaroring Sprint–Istanbul Park Feature
5	(Finland) Heikki Kovalainen	2005	2	Istanbul Park Sprint–Monza Feature
5	(Germany) Nico Rosberg	2005	2	Bahrain Feature–Bahrain Sprint
5	(United Kingdom) Lewis Hamilton	2006	2	European Feature–European Sprint
5	(Italy) Giorgio Pantano	2006	2	Monza Feature–Monza Sprint
5	(Netherlands) Giedo van der Garde	2009	2	Spa-Francorchamps Sprint–Monza Feature
5	(France) Romain Grosjean	2011	2	Nürburgring Sprint–Hungaroring Feature
5	(Italy) Luca Filippi	2011	2	Spa-Francorchamps Sprint–Monza Feature
5	(United Kingdom) Jolyon Palmer	2014	2	Monza Sprint–Sochi Feature
5	(United States) Alexander Rossi	2015	2	Spa-Francorchamps Sprint–Monza Feature
5	(Italy) Antonio Giovinazzi	2016	2	Baku Feature–Baku Sprint
5	(Russia) Sergey Sirotkin	2016	2	Hungaroring Sprint–Hockenheimring Feature
5	(Italy) Antonio Giovinazzi	2016	2	Spa-Francorchamps Sprint–Monza Feature

=== Most consecutive feature race wins ===
	Driver	Season	Wins	Consecutive feature race won
1	(Venezuela) Pastor Maldonado	2010	6	Istanbul Park–Spa-Francorchamps

=== Total wins in feature races ===
	Driver	Seasons	Wins
1	(Belgium) Stoffel Vandoorne	2014–2015	10
2	(Italy) Giorgio Pantano	2005–2008	7
2	(Venezuela) Pastor Maldonado	2007–2010	7
4	(France) Romain Grosjean	2008–2011	6
5	(Finland) Heikki Kovalainen	2005	4
5	(Brazil) Nelson Piquet Jr.	2005–2006	4
5	(Russia) Vitaly Petrov	2006–2009	4
5	(Italy) Luca Filippi	2006–2012	4
5	(United Kingdom) Sam Bird	2010–2011, 2013	4
5	(United Kingdom) Jolyon Palmer	2011–2014	4
5	(France) Pierre Gasly	2014–2016	4

=== Total wins in sprint races ===
	Driver	Seasons	Wins
1	(Monaco) Stefano Coletti	2009, 2011–2014	7
2	(Germany) Timo Glock	2006–2007	5
3	(Brazil) Luiz Razia	2009–2012	4
3	(Italy) Davide Valsecchi	2008–2012	4
3	(United Kingdom) James Calado	2012–2013	4
3	(United Kingdom) Alex Lynn	2015–2016	4
7	(United Kingdom) Adam Carroll	2005–2008, 2011	3
7	(Spain) Javier Villa	2006–2009	3
7	(Venezuela) Pastor Maldonado	2007–2010	3
7	(Mexico) Sergio Pérez	2009–2010	3
7	(France) Romain Grosjean	2008–2011	3
7	(Netherlands) Giedo van der Garde	2009–2012	3
7	(United Kingdom) Jolyon Palmer	2011–2014	3
7	(Brazil) Felipe Nasr	2012–2014	3
7	(Indonesia) Rio Haryanto	2012–2015	3

== Pole positions ==
=== Total pole positions ===
(Reverse grid pole positions do not count for this classification)

	Driver	Seasons	Poles
1	(Belgium) Stoffel Vandoorne	2014–2015	8
1	(France) Pierre Gasly	2014–2016	8
3	(Brazil) Nelson Piquet Jr.	2005–2006	6
3	(Italy) Giorgio Pantano	2005–2008	6
5	(France) Romain Grosjean	2008–2011	5
6	(Germany) Nico Rosberg	2005	4
6	(Germany) Timo Glock	2006–2007	4
6	(France) Jules Bianchi	2010–2011	4
6	(France) Charles Pic	2010–2011	4
6	(United Kingdom) Sam Bird	2010–2011, 2013	4
6	(United Kingdom) Jolyon Palmer	2011–2014	4
6	(Monaco) Stéphane Richelmi	2011–2014	4
6	(Russia) Sergey Sirotkin	2015–2016	4

=== Most consecutive pole positions ===
(Reverse grid pole positions do not count for this classification)

	Driver	Seasons	Poles	Consecutive poles
1	(Belgium) Stoffel Vandoorne	2014–2015	6	2014 Spa-Francorchamps-2015 Catalunya
2	(Brazil) Nelson Piquet Jr.	2006	3	Hungaroring-Monza
2	(France) Pierre Gasly	2015–2016	3	2015 Bahrain 2-2016 Catalunya
2	(France) Pierre Gasly	2016	3	Monza-Yas Marina
5	(Germany) Nico Rosberg	2005	2	Silverstone-Hockenheimring
5	(Brazil) Nelson Piquet Jr.	2006	2	Europen-Catalunya
5	(Germany) Timo Glock	2007	2	Nürburgring-Hungaroring
5	(Brazil) Bruno Senna	2008	2	Magny-Cours-Silverstone
5	(France) Romain Grosjean	2009	2	Catalunya-Monaco
5	(Russia) Vitaly Petrov	2009	2	Monza-Algarve
5	(Italy) Davide Valsecchi	2012	2	Sepang-Bahrain 1
5	(United Kingdom) Sam Bird	2013	2	Spa-Francorchamps-Monza

== Podiums ==
=== Total podiums ===
	Driver	Seasons	Podiums
1	(Belgium) Stoffel Vandoorne	2014-2015	26
2	(Italy) Giorgio Pantano	2005–2008	23
3	(Brazil) Lucas di Grassi	2007–2009	21
3	(France) Romain Grosjean	2008–2011	21
5	(Brazil) Felipe Nasr	2011–2014	20
6	(Venezuela) Pastor Maldonado	2007–2010	18
6	(Netherlands) Giedo van der Garde	2009–2012	18
6	(United Kingdom) Jolyon Palmer	2011–2014	18
6	(New Zealand) Mitch Evans	2013–2016	18
10	(Italy) Luca Filippi	2006–2012	17
10	(Italy) Davide Valsecchi	2008–2012	17

=== Most podiums in a season ===
	Driver	Season	Podiums
1	(Belgium) Stoffel Vandoorne	2015	16
2	(United Kingdom) Lewis Hamilton	2006	14
3	(Finland) Heikki Kovalainen	2005	12
3	(Germany) Nico Rosberg	2005	12
3	(United Kingdom) Jolyon Palmer	2014	12
6	(Germany) Timo Glock	2007	10
6	(Germany) Nico Hülkenberg	2009	10
6	(France) Romain Grosjean	2011	10
6	(Italy) Davide Valsecchi	2012	10
6	(Brazil) Felipe Nasr	2014	10
6	(Belgium) Stoffel Vandoorne	2014	10

== Fastest laps ==
=== Total fastest laps ===
	Driver	Seasons	Fastest laps
1	(Monaco) Stefano Coletti	2009, 2009–2014	12
2	(Belgium) Stoffel Vandoorne	2014–2015	11
3	(Venezuela) Pastor Maldonado	2007–2010	10
3	(France) Romain Grosjean	2008–2011	10
5	(United Kingdom) Jolyon Palmer	2011–2014	9
6	(Italy) Luca Filippi	2006–2012	8
6	(United Kingdom) Sam Bird	2010–2011, 2013	8
8	(United Kingdom) Lewis Hamilton	2006	7
9	(Germany) Nico Hülkenberg	2009	6
9	(Mexico) Sergio Pérez	2009–2010	6
9	(Italy) Davide Valsecchi	2008–2012	6
9	(Mexico) Esteban Gutiérrez	2011–2012	6
9	(Switzerland) Fabio Leimer	2010–2013	6

== Points ==
=== Total points ===
	Driver	Seasons	Points
1	(Belgium) Stoffel Vandoorne	2014–2015	570.5
2	(United Kingdom) Jolyon Palmer	2012–2014	473
2	(Brazil) Felipe Nasr	2011–2014	473
4	(New Zealand) Mitch Evans	2013–2016	455
5	(Switzerland) Fabio Leimer	2010–2013	379
6	(Monaco) Stefano Coletti	2009, 2011–2014	343
6	(Italy) Raffaele Marciello	2014–2016	343
8	(Italy) Davide Valsecchi	2008–2012	331
9	(France) Pierre Gasly	2014–2016	329
10	(United Kingdom) James Calado	2012–2013	317

=== Most points in a season ===
	Driver	Points	Season	Championship position
1	(Belgium) Stoffel Vandoorne	341.5	2015	1st
2	(United Kingdom) Jolyon Palmer	276	2014	1st
3	(Italy) Davide Valsecchi	247	2012	1st
4	(Belgium) Stoffel Vandoorne	229	2014	2nd
5	(Brazil) Felipe Nasr	224	2014	3rd
6	(Brazil) Luiz Razia	222	2012	2nd
7	(France) Pierre Gasly	219	2016	1st
8	(Italy) Antonio Giovinazzi	211	2016	2nd
9	(Switzerland) Fabio Leimer	201	2013	1st
10	(United States) Alexander Rossi	181.5	2015	2nd

== Starts ==
=== Total Starts ===
	Driver	Seasons	Races (Starts)	First start	Last start
1	(Venezuela) Johnny Cecotto Jr.	2009-2016	120 (118) (Note: Johnny Cecotto Jr. did not start the 2009 Algarve Feature and the 2013 Monaco Sprint races.)	2009 Monza Feature	2016 Yas Marina Sprint
2	(Italy) Luca Filippi	2006-2012	111 (110) (Note: Luca Filippi did not start the 2012 Marina Bay Sprint race.)	2006 Valencia Feature	2012 Marina Bay Feature
3	(Colombia) Julián Leal	2011-2015	102	2011 Istanbul Park Feature	2015 Monza Sprint
4	(Italy) Davide Valsecchi	2008-2012	98 (96) (Note: Davide Valsecchi did not start the 2008 Istanbul Park Feature and the Sprint races.)	2008 Catalunya Feature	2012 Marina Bay Sprint
5	(Netherlands) Daniël de Jong	2012-2016	92 (90) (Note: Daniël de Jong did not start the 2015 Spa-Francorchamps Sprint race and the 2015 Yas Marina Sprint was cancelled before a lap was completed.)	2012 Valencia Feature	2016 Yas Marina Sprint
5	(Spain) Sergio Canamasas	2012-2016	92 (90) (Note: Sergio Canamasas did not start the 2014 Hungaroring Sprint race and the 2015 Yas Marina Sprint was cancelled before a lap was completed.)	2012 Hockenheim Feature	2016 Yas Marina Sprint
7	(Indonesia) Rio Haryanto	2012-2015	90 (89) (Note: Rio Haryanto did not start the 2015 Yas Marina Sprint race as it was cancelled before a lap was completed.)	2012 Sepang Feature	2015 Yas Marina Sprint
8	(France) Nathanaël Berthon	2012-2015	88 (87) (Note: Nathanaël Berthon did not start the 2015 Yas Marina Sprint race as it was cancelled before a lap was completed.)	2012 Sepang Feature	2015 Yas Marina Sprint
9	(Monaco) Stefano Coletti	2009, 2011-2014	88 (86) (Note: Stefano Coletti did not start the 2009 Spa-Francorchamps Sprint and 2010 Spa-Francorchamps Sprint races.)	2009 Valencia Feature	2014 Yas Marina Sprint
10	(New Zealand) Mitch Evans	2013-2016	88 (85) (Note: Mitch Evans did not start the 2015 Catalunya Sprint, 2015 Monaco Sprint and the 2015 Yas Marina Sprint race as it was cancelled before a lap was completed.)	2013 Sepang Feature	2016 Yas Marina Sprint
