= Stoffel Vandoorne =

Belgian racing driver (born 1992)

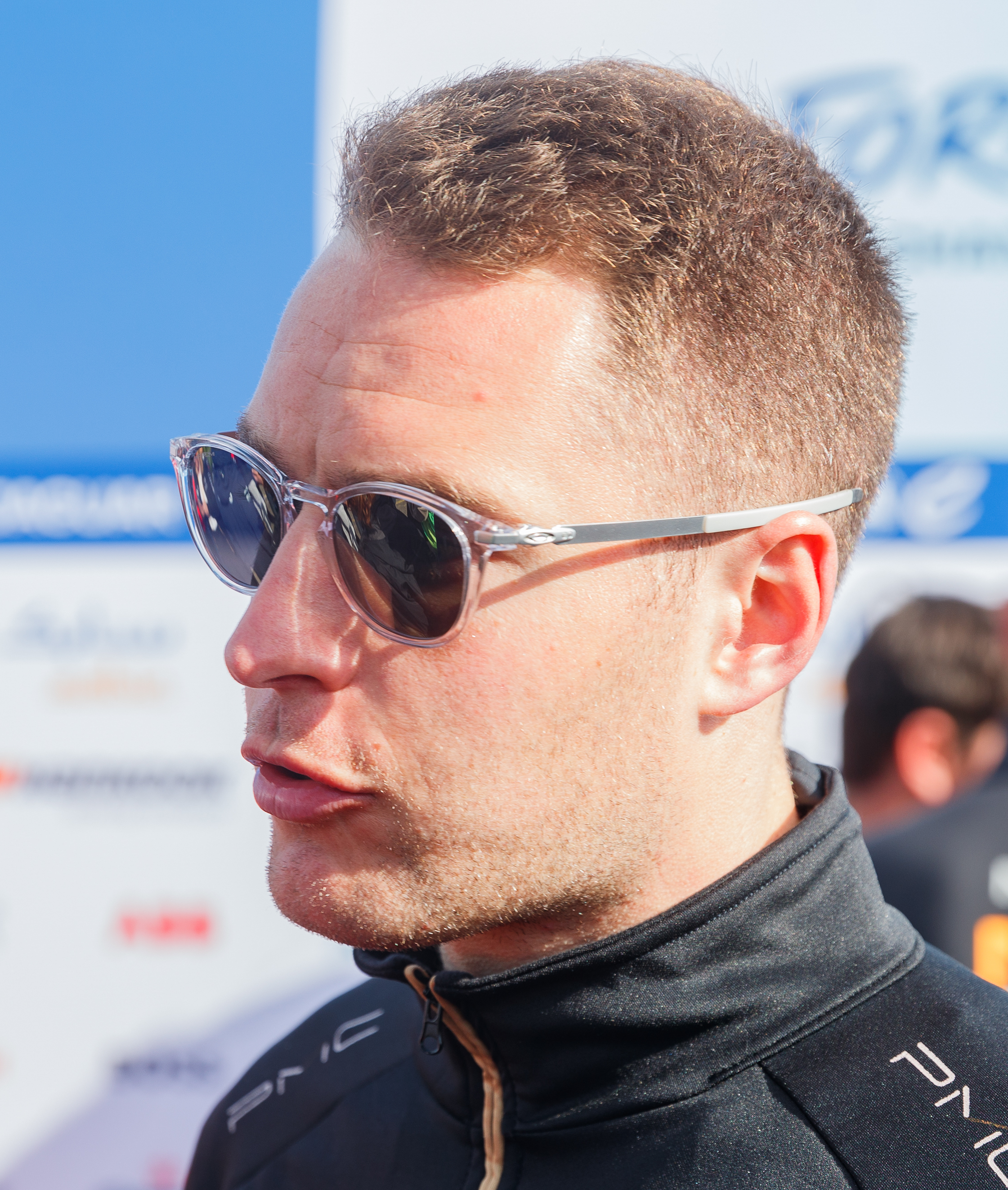
- Vandoorne at the 2023 Berlin ePrix
- Born: Stoffel Jacques Luc Vandoorne; 26 March 1992 (age 34); Roeselare, West Flanders, Belgium

Formula E career
- Debut season: 2018–19
- Current team: Jaguar
- Car number: 5
- Former teams: HWA, Mercedes, DS Penske, Maserati MSG
- Starts: 103
- Championships: 1 (2021–22)
- Wins: 4
- Podiums: 17
- Poles: 8
- Fastest laps: 3
- Finished last season: 14th (62 pts)
- Statistics up to date as of 28 July 2025.

Formula One World Championship career
- Nationality: (Belgium) Belgian
- Active years: 2016–2018
- Team: McLaren
- Car number: 2 (Note: Vandoorne selected the number 2 as his personal driver number, per FIA regulations; at the 2016 Bahrain Grand Prix, he competed using the standard reserve number 47 for McLaren.)
- Entries: 42 (41 starts)
- Championships: 0
- Wins: 0
- Podiums: 0
- Career points: 26
- Pole positions: 0
- Fastest laps: 0
- First entry: 2016 Bahrain Grand Prix
- Last entry: 2018 Abu Dhabi Grand Prix

FIA World Endurance Championship career
- Debut season: 2018–19
- Current team: Peugeot TotalEnergies
- Categorisation: FIA Platinum
- Car number: 94
- Former teams: SMP, Jota
- Starts: 28
- Championships: 0
- Wins: 0
- Podiums: 7
- Poles: 2
- Fastest laps: 2
- Best finish: 2nd in 2021 (LMP2)

24 Hours of Le Mans career
- Years: 2019, 2021, 2024
- Teams: SMP, Jota, Peugeot
- Best finish: 3rd (2019)
- Class wins: 0

Previous series
- 2016; 2014–2015; 2013; 2011–2012; 2011–2012; 2010: Super Formula; GP2 Series; Formula Renault 3.5; Formula Renault Eurocup; Formula Renault NEC; F4 Eurocup 1.6

Championship titles
- 2015; 2012; 2010: GP2 Series; Formula Renault Eurocup; F4 Eurocup 1.6
- Website: stoffelvandoorne.com

Stoffel Jacques Luc Vandoorne (Dutch pronunciation: [ˈstɔfəl vɑnˈdoːr(ə)n]; born 26 March 1992) is a Belgian racing driver, who is set to compete in Formula E for Jaguar and serves as a test and reserve driver for Aston Martin in Formula One. In formula racing, Vandoorne competed in Formula One from 2016 to 2018, and won the 2021–22 Formula E World Championship with Mercedes. He has raced in Formula E with DS Penske in the 2022-23 and 2023-24 seasons and Maserati in the 2024-25 season.

Born in and raised in Roeselare in West Flanders, Vandoorne began karting aged six. Despite struggling with a lack of funding, Vandoorne achieved success in national and international competition, progressing to junior formulae in 2010. He won his first championship at the 2010 F4 Eurocup with the FFSA Academy, then progressing to Formula Renault, where he won the Eurocup in 2012 and finished runner-up to Kevin Magnussen in the 3.5 Series in 2013. Vandoorne graduated to the GP2 Series with ART in 2014, finishing runner-up to Jolyon Palmer in his rookie season. The following season, he won the championship in record-breaking fashion with seven victories and 16 podiums from 21 starts. A member of the McLaren Young Driver Programme since 2013, Vandoorne made his Formula One debut with McLaren at the 2016 Bahrain Grand Prix, substituting for an injured Fernando Alonso and scoring his maiden points finish after outqualifying teammate Jenson Button. He partnered Alonso as a full-time driver in 2017, scoring several points finishes across two full seasons before being released at the end of 2018; he has since served as a reserve driver for McLaren, Mercedes, Racing Point and Aston Martin.

Vandoorne moved into Formula E for the 2018–19 season with HWA. Despite the Venturi powertrains' relative lack of performance, Vandoorne achieved his maiden pole position at the Hong Kong ePrix. Vandoorne retained his seat at the newly-formed Mercedes team in 2019–20, finishing runner-up to António Félix da Costa after taking his maiden win at race six of the Berlin ePrix. Vandoorne entered sportscar racing in 2021, finishing runner-up in the LMP2 class of the FIA World Endurance Championship with Jota. In his third season with Mercedes in Formula E, Vandoorne won the World Championship after scoring eight podium finishes, including a win at the Monaco ePrix. He moved to DS Penske for 2022–23, but was unable to defend his title and left after two winless seasons to join Maserati. Vandoorne joined the Peugeot 9X8 Hypercar project in 2023, making his premier class WEC debut at the 6 Hours of Fuji.

== Early and personal life ==
Stoffel Jacques Luc Vandoorne was born on 26 March 1992 in Roeselare, West Flanders. Vandoorne was introduced to motorsport at the age of six during a visit to the kart track of World Karts in Kortrijk in Flanders, Belgium, with his father. Vandoorne started karting after the owner of the track gave him a mini-kart.

== Junior racing career ==
=== Karting ===
Initially, lack of funding restricted Vandoorne to race three to four races per year. By the age of sixteen he was Belgian KF2 Champion. In 2009, he finished as runner-up in the CIK-FIA World Cup in the KF2 category. That same year, he won the 'steering wheel' competition held by the Royal Automobile Club of Belgium. The prize money of 45,000 euros helped him start his car racing career in F4 Eurocup 1.6.

=== Formula Renault ===
==== 2010 ====
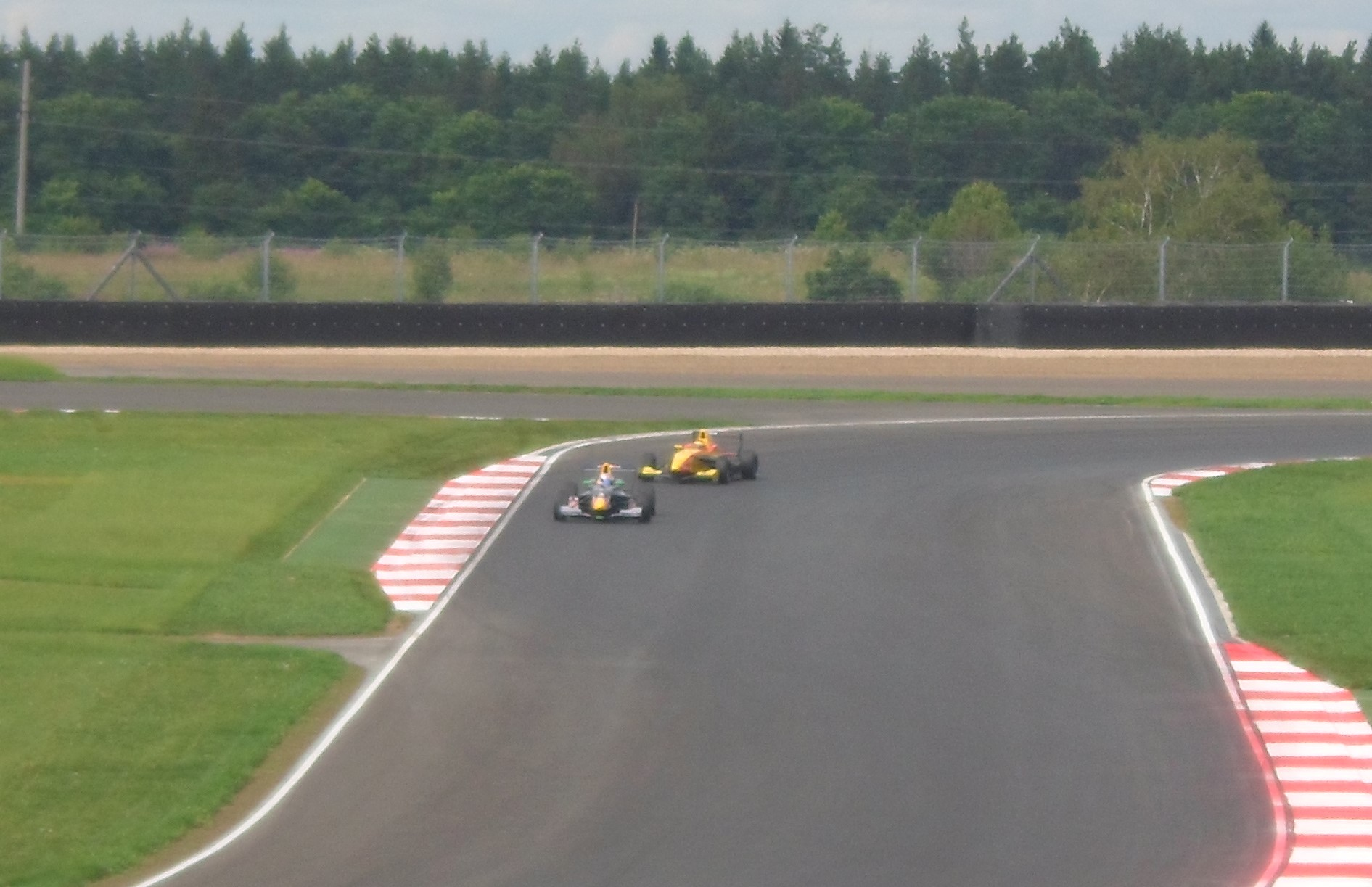
Vandoorne (behind) racing Daniil Kvyat (front) in Formula Renault in 2012

In 2010, Vandoorne moved up to single-seater racing, joining the F4 Eurocup 1.6 series. He went on to win the series on his first attempt, finishing the season with six wins and three further podium finishes. The prize from winning the series helped him to move up to the Eurocup Formula Renault 2.0 the following year. He also earned a place in the FIA Driver Academy.

==== 2011 ====
In 2011, Vandoorne graduated to competing in the Eurocup Formula Renault 2.0 with Kurt Mollekens' KTR team. He finished fifth overall, with one podium at the Hungaroring and another eight-point-scoring finishes throughout the season. He also participated in Formula Renault 2.0 Northern European Cup, where he finished third in the series' standings with eight podiums.

==== 2012 ====
For the 2012 season, Vandoorne remained in the Eurocup, but left KTR to join Josef Kaufmann Racing. He won the championship by ten points after a tight battle between himself and Red Bull-backed Daniil Kvyat. Between them, they won eleven of the fourteen races and finished over 100 points ahead of their nearest challenger. Vandoorne finished the season with four wins and six podiums to his name. He also contested selected events in the Northern European Cup, where he won five of the seven races that he started, and finished on the podium in a sixth race.

==== 2013 ====
In 2013, Vandoorne raced in Formula Renault 3.5, where he replaced 2012 champion Robin Frijns at Fortec Motorsport. He finished runner-up to Kevin Magnussen with four wins and ten podiums, including a victory at his home track of Spa-Francorchamps.

=== GP2 Series ===
==== 2014 ====
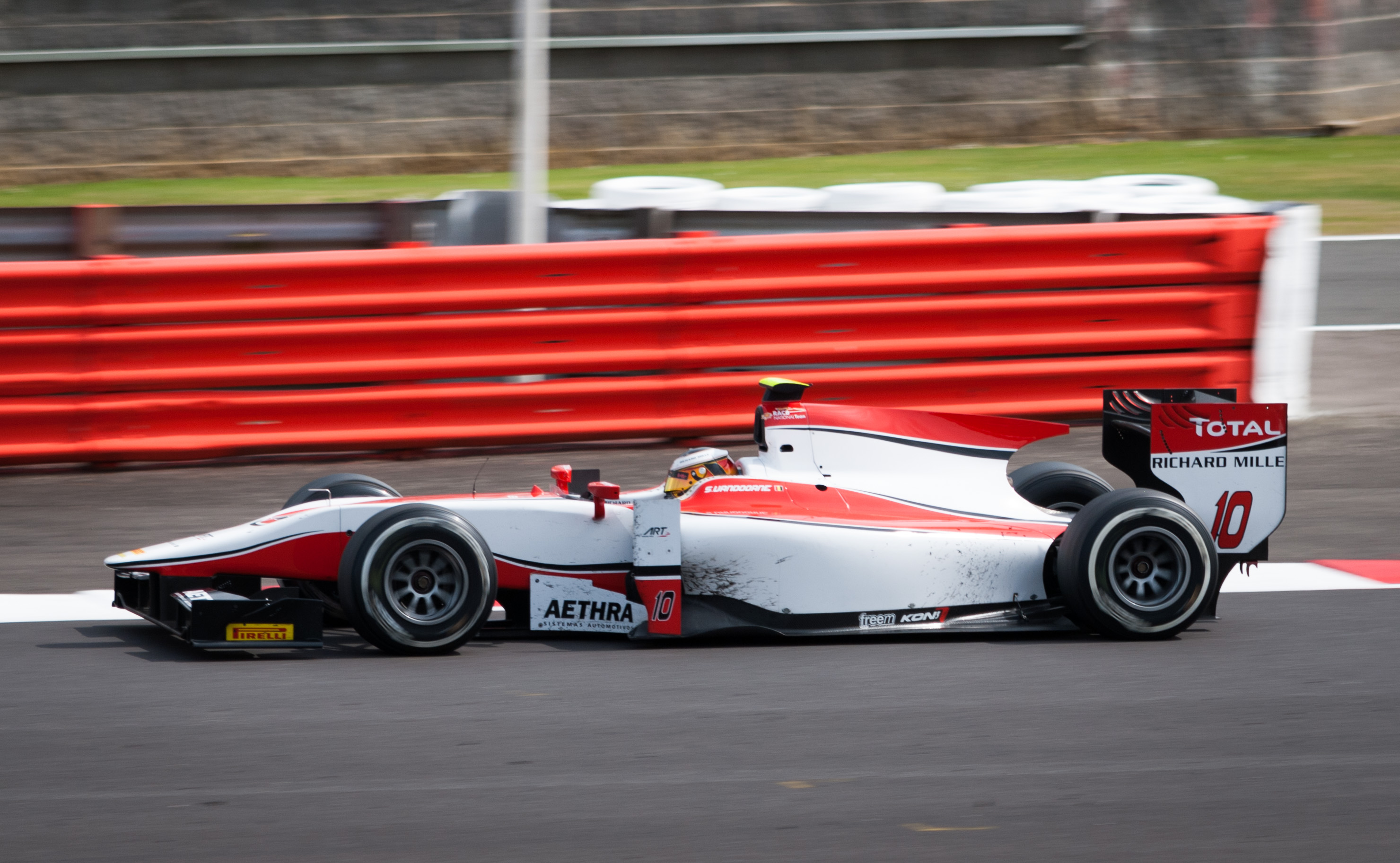
Vandoorne racing at the Silverstone round of the 2014 GP2 Series

In January 2014, it was confirmed that Vandoorne would make his debut in GP2, racing with ART. In the opening race at Bahrain, Vandoorne claimed his first victory of the season in the feature race. He followed this up with four consecutive pole positions, three more wins at the Hungaroring, Monza and Yas Marina and six additional podiums. Despite being a rookie, he finished runner-up to 2014 champion Jolyon Palmer.

==== 2015 ====
Vandoorne reunited with ART for 2015, as well as was considered the main title contender. He was partnered by 2014 Japanese Formula Three champion Nobuharu Matsushita. After five feature race wins, twelve podiums and four pole positions, Vandoorne took the title in Sochi, 108 points over his nearest rival Alexander Rossi.

Vandoorne holds the record for all-time most wins, most feature race wins, most pole positions and most consecutive pole positions, most podiums, most podiums in a season, most points and most points in a single season in GP2 history, with the series being rebranded as the FIA Formula 2 Championship at the end of the following year.

=== Super Formula ===
On 12 February 2016, it was announced that Vandoorne would race a Honda in Super Formula for Dandelion Racing. He finished fourth overall, the highest ranking among Honda engine users, with two wins and one pole position at Fuji Speedway in wet conditions throughout the season.

== Formula One career ==
In February 2013, Vandoorne joined McLaren's Young Driver Programme, under the tutelage of his then manager Richard Goddard, in collaboration with the team's sporting director Sam Michael and its head of communications Matt Bishop, to whom Vandoorne had been introduced in 2011 by Alex Wurz.

In January 2014, Vandoorne was announced as a third driver for McLaren F1 also taking up driving duties in the GP2 Series for ART Grand Prix.

=== McLaren (2016–2018, 2020–2022) ===
==== 2016: Race debut as reserve driver ====
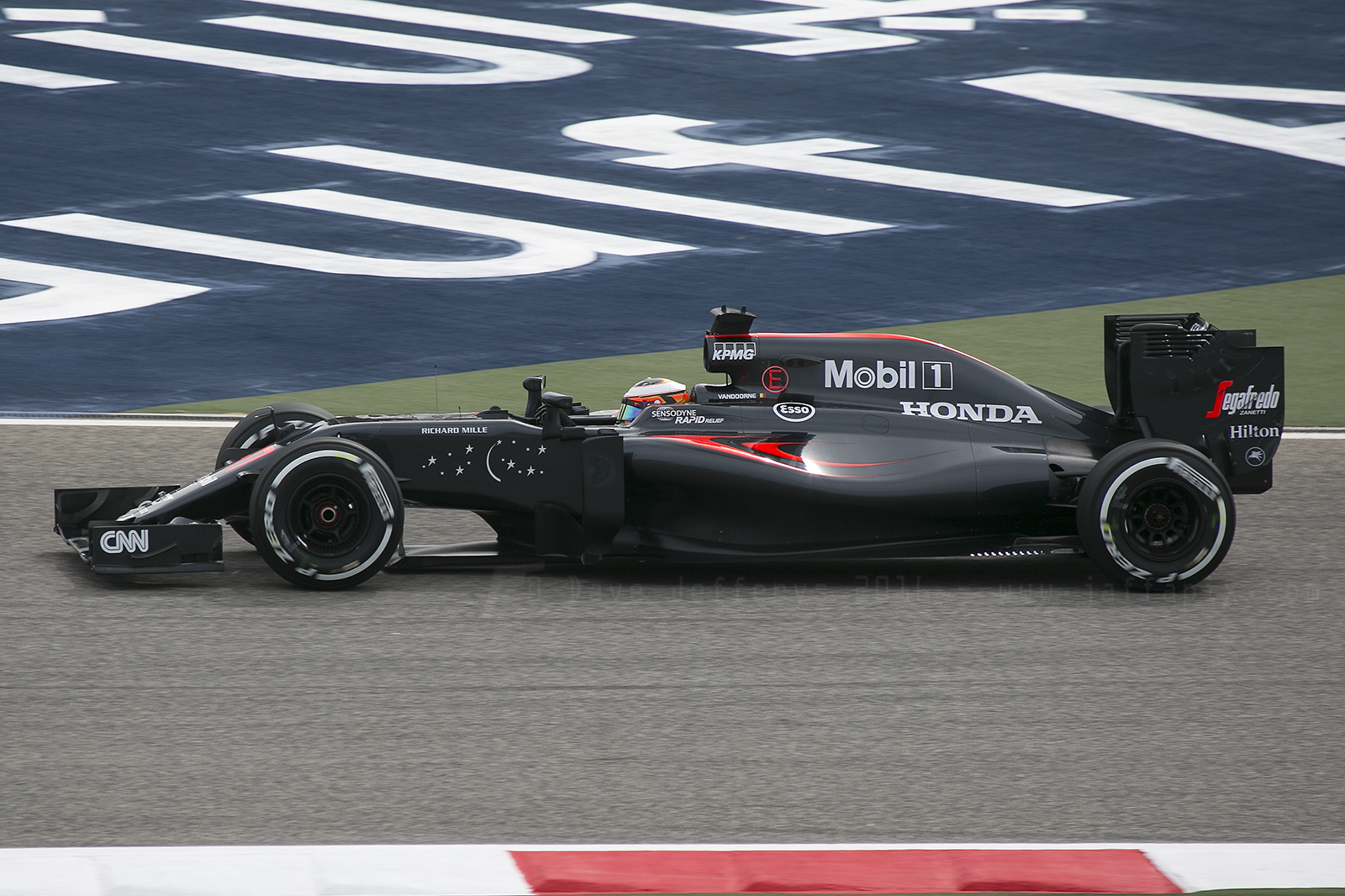
Vandoorne on his F1 debut, driving for McLaren at the 2016 Bahrain Grand Prix

On 31 March 2016, it was announced Vandoorne would be replacing regular driver Fernando Alonso at the Bahrain Grand Prix after the Spaniard was ruled unfit to drive following a major accident during the Australian Grand Prix. After qualifying 12th ahead of Jenson Button, Vandoorne finished 10th and became the first reserve driver to score points on debut since Sebastian Vettel at the 2007 United States Grand Prix.

On 3 September 2016, ahead of the Italian Grand Prix, it was announced by McLaren that Jenson Button would not be racing in 2017, and that Vandoorne would be replacing him to partner Alonso for the 2017 season.

==== 2017: Full rookie season ====
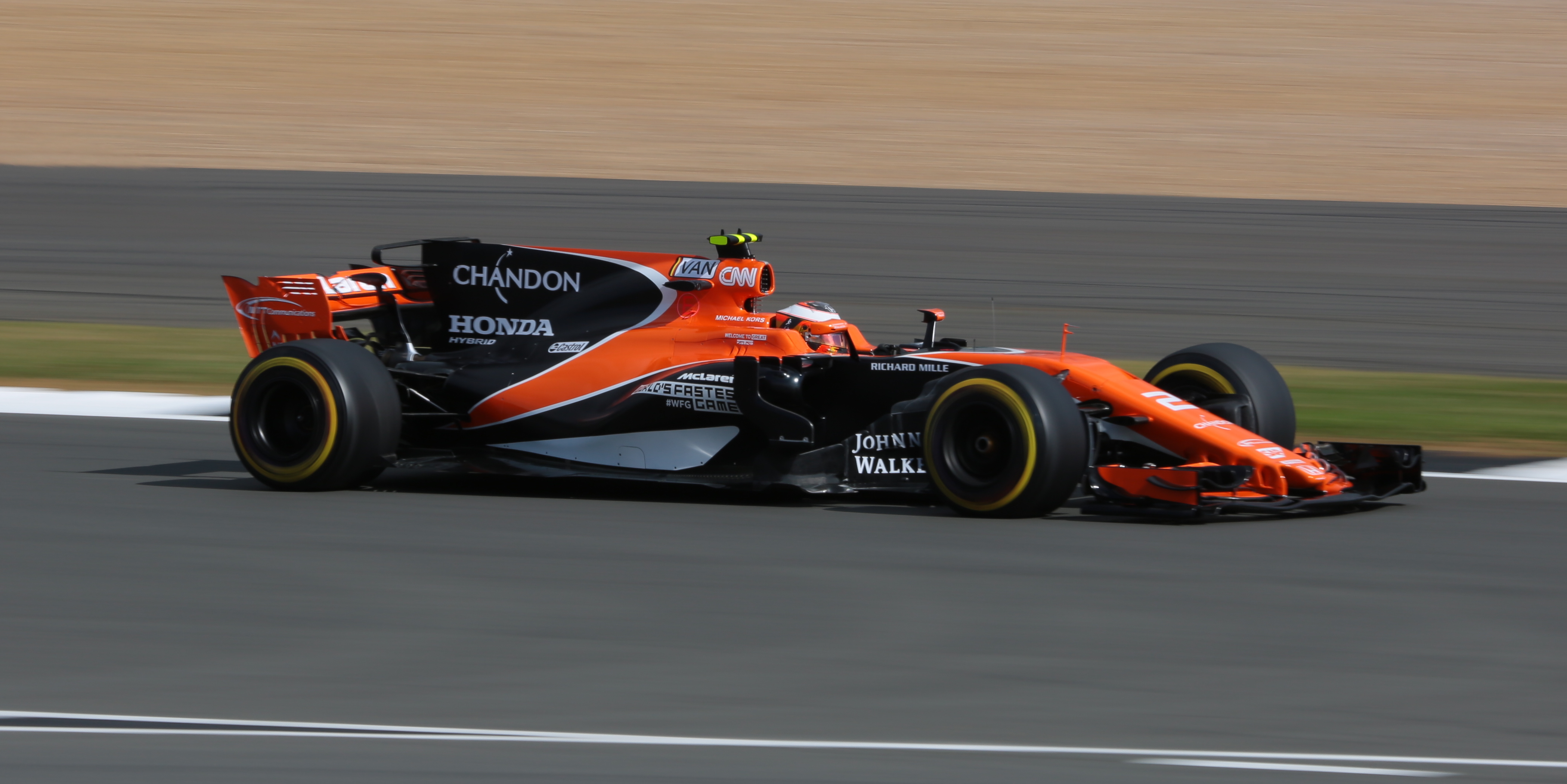
Vandoorne driving for McLaren at the 2017 British Grand Prix

In his debut full season at McLaren, Vandoorne established himself as a considerable rookie next to veteran F1 Champion, Fernando Alonso. With the uncompetitive McLaren, Vandoorne racked up 13 points compared to Alonso's 17. The key issues lay in the reliability and performance of the car which resulted in one DNS and five DNFs throughout the 20 race season. Nevertheless, he managed to crack into the top-ten in Hungary, Malaysia and Singapore.

On 23 August 2017, it was announced that Vandoorne would be retained for the 2018 season.

==== 2018 ====
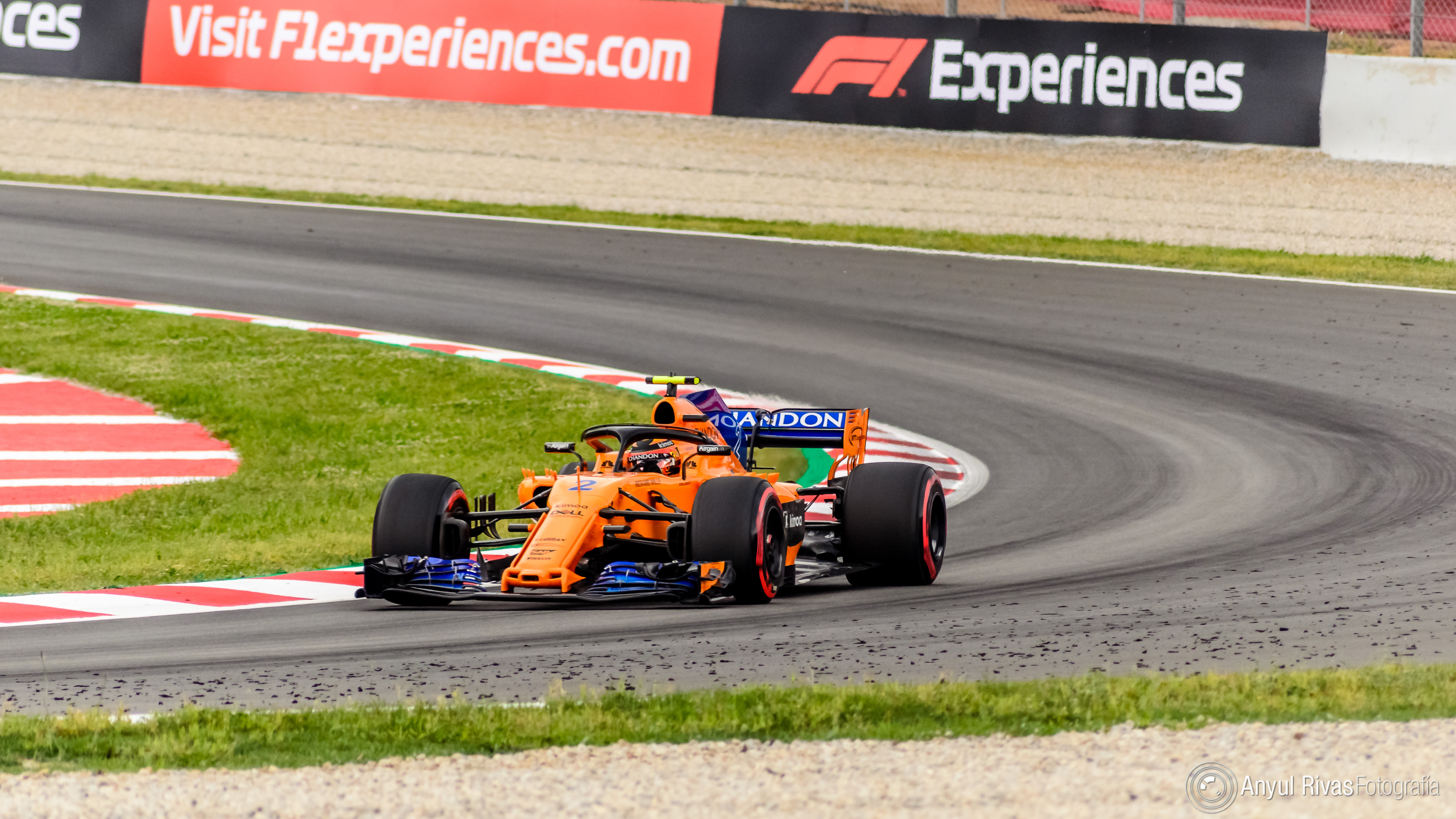
Vandoorne at the 2018 Spanish Grand Prix

In the new McLaren Renault partnership, Vandoorne enjoyed a good start to the season with three points finishes in the first four races. However, as the season progressed, he struggled to maintain this momentum which left him with eight points by the Japanese Grand Prix. Moreover, the lack of a competitive package in the McLaren resulted in a long drought in points finishes between the 2018 Azerbaijan Grand Prix and the 2018 Mexican Grand Prix. Vandoorne ended the season in 16th ahead of four other drivers in the drivers' championship. However, the last few Grands Prix saw Vandoorne in some impressive battles, particularly in the Abu Dhabi Grand Prix with Esteban Ocon and Romain Grosjean, which led him to finish eighth on the Formula 1 Power Rankings.

It was announced on 3 September 2018 that Vandoorne would leave McLaren at the end of the 2018 season.

==== 2020–2022: Return to reserve driver role ====
Vandoorne was the simulator driver for the McLaren team in 2020 and was named as one of the team's reserve drivers in 2021, but in 2022 was not chosen as the driver for the final pre-season test at Bahrain after Daniel Ricciardo tested positive for COVID-19.

=== Mercedes development driver (2019–2022) ===
Vandoorne was the simulator driver for the Mercedes team in 2019 and was named as one of the team's reserve drivers in 2020, but in the end was not chosen as the driver for the 2020 Sakhir Grand Prix after Hamilton tested positive for COVID-19. Vandoorne drove for Mercedes in the season-ending 2020 Abu Dhabi Young Drivers Test alongside Formula E teammate Nyck de Vries.

Vandoorne was also made available as reserve driver for Racing Point in 2020 and McLaren from 2020 to 2022, as part of an agreement between Mercedes and both teams.

=== Aston Martin reserve driver (2023–present) ===
Vandoorne was announced to be joining Aston Martin for the 2023 Formula One World Championship as a reserve and simulator driver, sharing duties with 2022 Formula 2 champion Felipe Drugovich. Additionally, he was also made a reserve driver for McLaren. In August, Vandoorne drove the Aston Martin AMR23 during a tyre test at Spa-Francorchamps.

Vandoorne remained the reserve driver for Aston Martin for the 2024 season and drove an Aston Martin AMR24 during a tyre test at Spa-Francorchamps.

Vandoorne continued as a reserve driver for Aston Martin in 2025. At the end of the year, he took part in the Yas Marina end-of-season test, where he tested out Pirelli tyres for 2026.

== Formula E career ==
=== HWA (2018–2019) ===
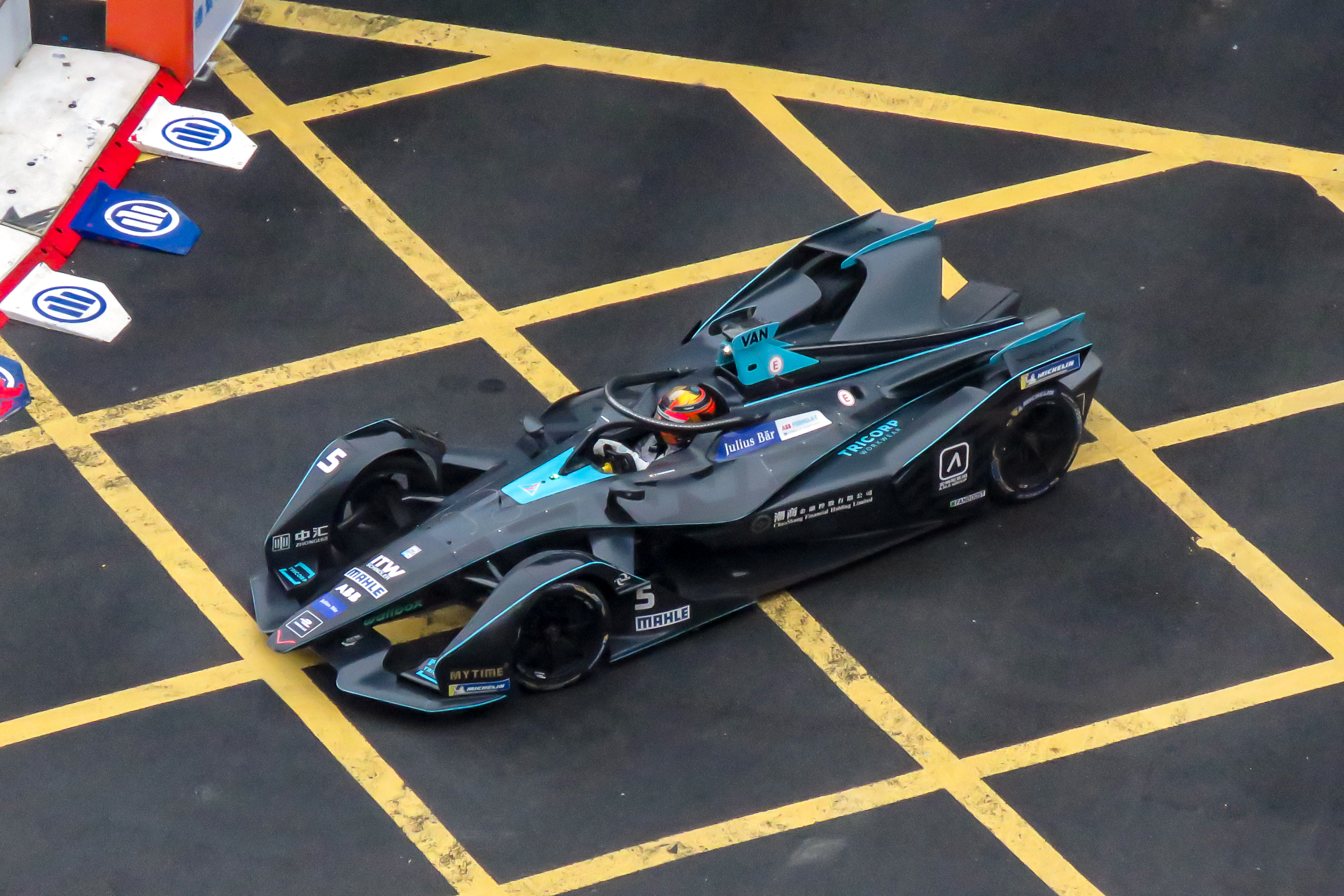
Vandoorne at the 2019 Hong Kong ePrix

It was confirmed on 15 October 2018 that Vandoorne would drive for HWA Racelab for the 2018–19 Formula E season. He would be joining Britain's Gary Paffett to complete the driver lineup for HWA Racelab. Vandoorne would go on and start his Formula E debut just three weeks after leaving Formula 1 and would come 17th in his first race. He has also achieved his first qualifying pole position in Formula E at a wet 2019 Hong Kong ePrix. However, he retired from the race after having a driveshaft issue. He came third in the 2019 Rome ePrix and booked his first podium in Formula E. Vandoorne finished his debut season in 16th position in the driver's standings with 35 points.

=== Mercedes-EQ (2019–2022) ===
==== 2019–20 ====
In the 2019–20 season, Vandoorne drove for Mercedes-Benz EQ with 2019 Formula 2 Champion, Nyck de Vries. Vandoorne took two consecutive podiums in the two first races. The E-Prix of Mexico and Marrakesh saw a series of poor finishes, and at the time of the season's suspension due to the COVID-19 pandemic, he sat 29 points below the championship leader, António Félix da Costa. Following the resumption of the season for six races in Berlin, he finished in the points in four of the six races, including his first win in the season finale. He ultimately finished second in the standings, though behind Félix da Costa by 71 points.

==== 2020–21 ====
Vandoorne continued to drive for the renamed Mercedes-EQ Formula E Team for the 2020–21 season, again partnering Nyck de Vries. Vandoorne achieved one win at the second race of 2021 Rome ePrix, and two third place finishes at 2021 Valencia ePrix and 2021 Berlin ePrix. de Vries secured his first Drivers' Championship, as Vandoorne finished ninth in the standings. Vandoorne and de Vries' total points haul allowed Mercedes to achieve their first Teams' Championship that season. Vandoorne and de Vries' partnership will continue for the 2021-22 season.

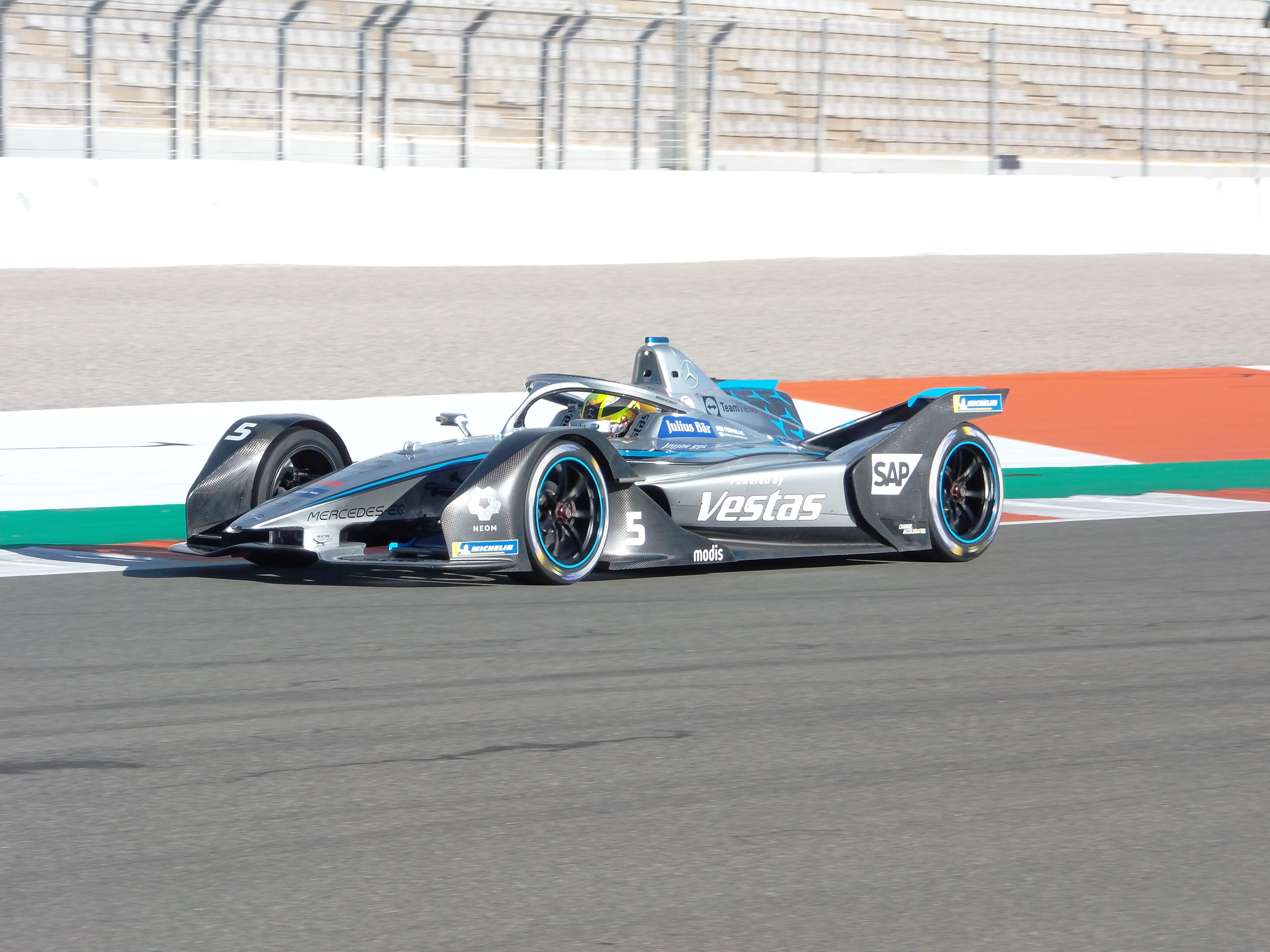
Vandoorne during testing in Valencia in December 2021

==== 2021–22 ====
Vandoorne and de Vries continued to race with the Mercedes-EQ team for the 2021–22 season, Mercedes' final in Formula E. The team started out with promising pace at the opening round in Diriyah, showcased by Vandoorne taking the first pole position of the season. During the race however, he fell behind his teammate after missing the Attack Mode activation point and eventually finished second. The following day, Vandoorne fought back to seventh and set the fastest lap of the race, having started from twelfth. After being taken out of a points-paying position by Lucas di Grassi near the end of the Mexico City ePrix, the Belgian returned to the rostrum in Rome, converting a pole position into third place on Saturday. Monaco brought the highlight of the year, as Vandoorne dominated the second half of the race to take his first victory of the season. More success - in the form of a pair of third places in Berlin - followed, before he took more points for his championship challenge at Jakarta and Marrakesh. With two of his title rivals, namely Jean-Éric Vergne and Edoardo Mortara, experiencing a difficult weekend at the New York City ePrix, Vandoorne was able to capitalise by way of a fourth and a second place, which put him at the top of the standings.

At the penultimate event in London, Vandoorne repeated his results from the previous round, most impressively performing a comeback drive from 13th to fourth on Sunday. These results, coupled with a technical problem for closest title rival Mitch Evans, put Vandoorne 36 points ahead of the Kiwi before the season finale in Seoul. In the South Korean capital, Evans took victory on Saturday, though he would not gain much ground as Vandoorne finished fifth. On Sunday, Vandoorne finished second, clinching the title and bringing a second drivers' and teams' world championship to the departing Mercedes outfit.

=== DS Penske (2023–2024) ===
==== 2022–23 ====
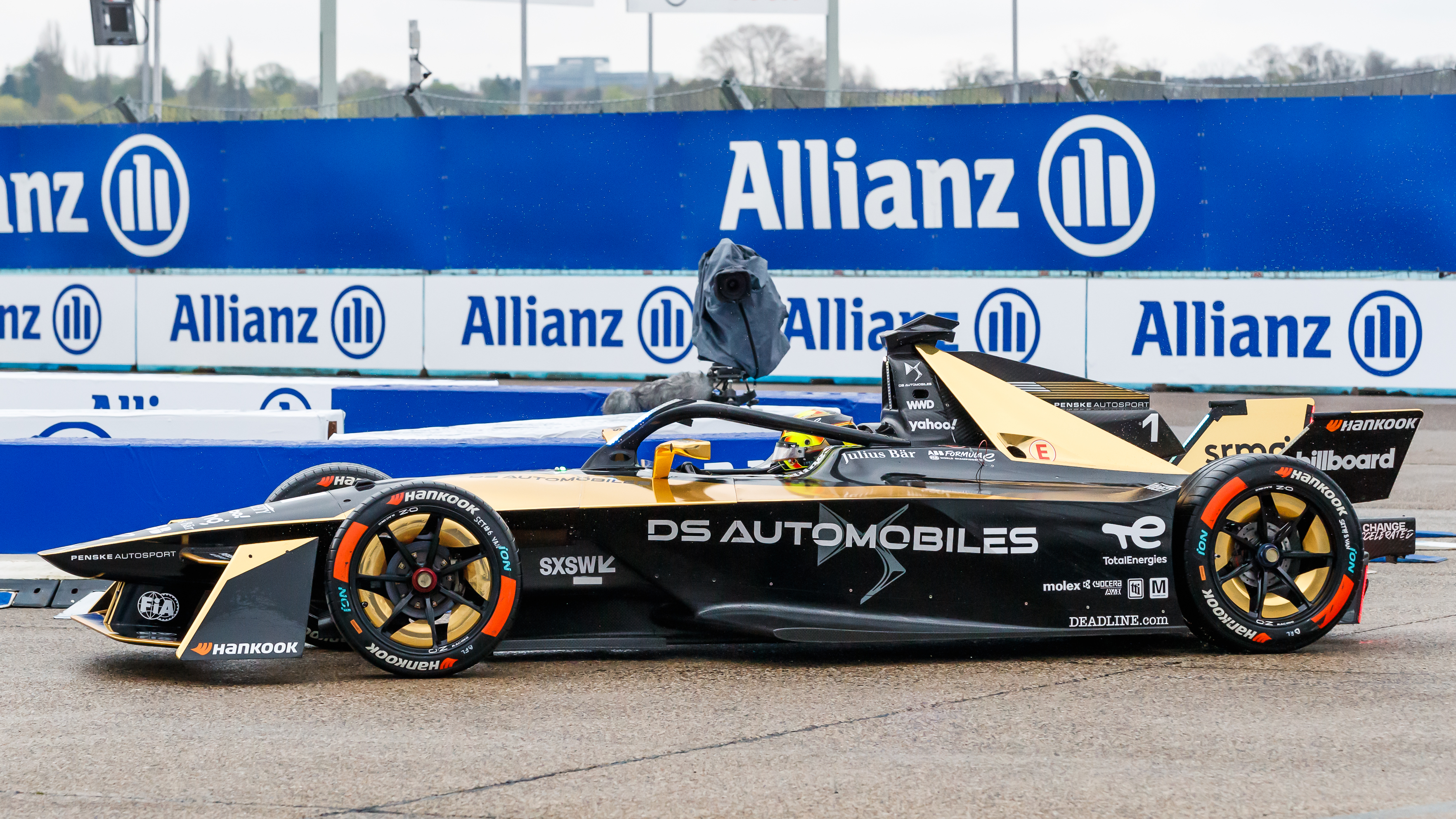
Vandoorne during the 2023 Berlin ePrix

In October 2022, it was announced that Vandoorne would be joining the newly formed DS Penske outfit alongside fellow champion Jean-Éric Vergne for the 2023 season. The introduction of the Formula E Gen3 chassis to competition posed a challenge to Penske, leading to a disappointing season for Vandoorne. With no podiums, a first in the Belgian's Formula E career, and a lone pole in São Paulo, Vandoorne ended up eleventh in the standings, 51 points behind teammate Vergne.

==== 2023–24 ====
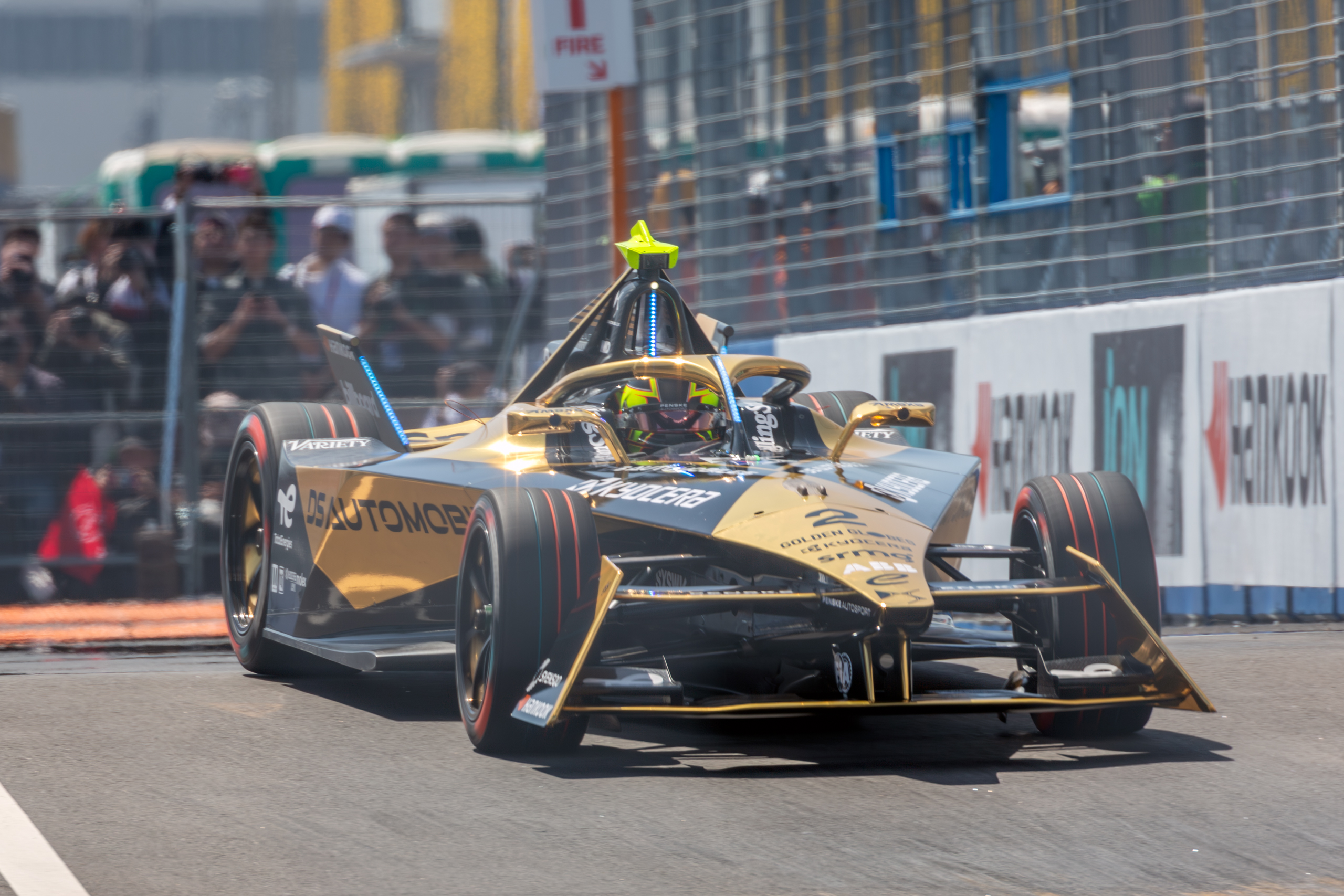
Vandoorne at the 2024 Tokyo ePrix

Vandoorne and Vergne were retained by DS Penske for the 2023–24 season.

Vandoorne would depart the team after two mediocre seasons with the team at the conclusion of the season.

=== Maserati (2024–2025) ===
==== 2024–25 ====
Vandoorne would switch to Maserati MSG Racing for the 2024–25 season, lining up alongside Jake Hughes. At the end of the season, Vandoorne and Hughes were replaced by Jean-Éric Vergne and Nick Cassidy as the team were rebranded to Citroën Racing.

=== Jaguar reserve driver (2025–2026) ===
After failing to find a seat for the 2025–26 season, Vandoorne joined Jaguar Racing to become their reserve driver for that season.

=== Jaguar TCS Racing (2027–) ===
Vandoorne returned to Formula E for the 2026–27 season with Jaguar TCS Racing alongside António Félix da Costa.

== Sportscar racing career ==
=== FIA World Endurance Championship ===
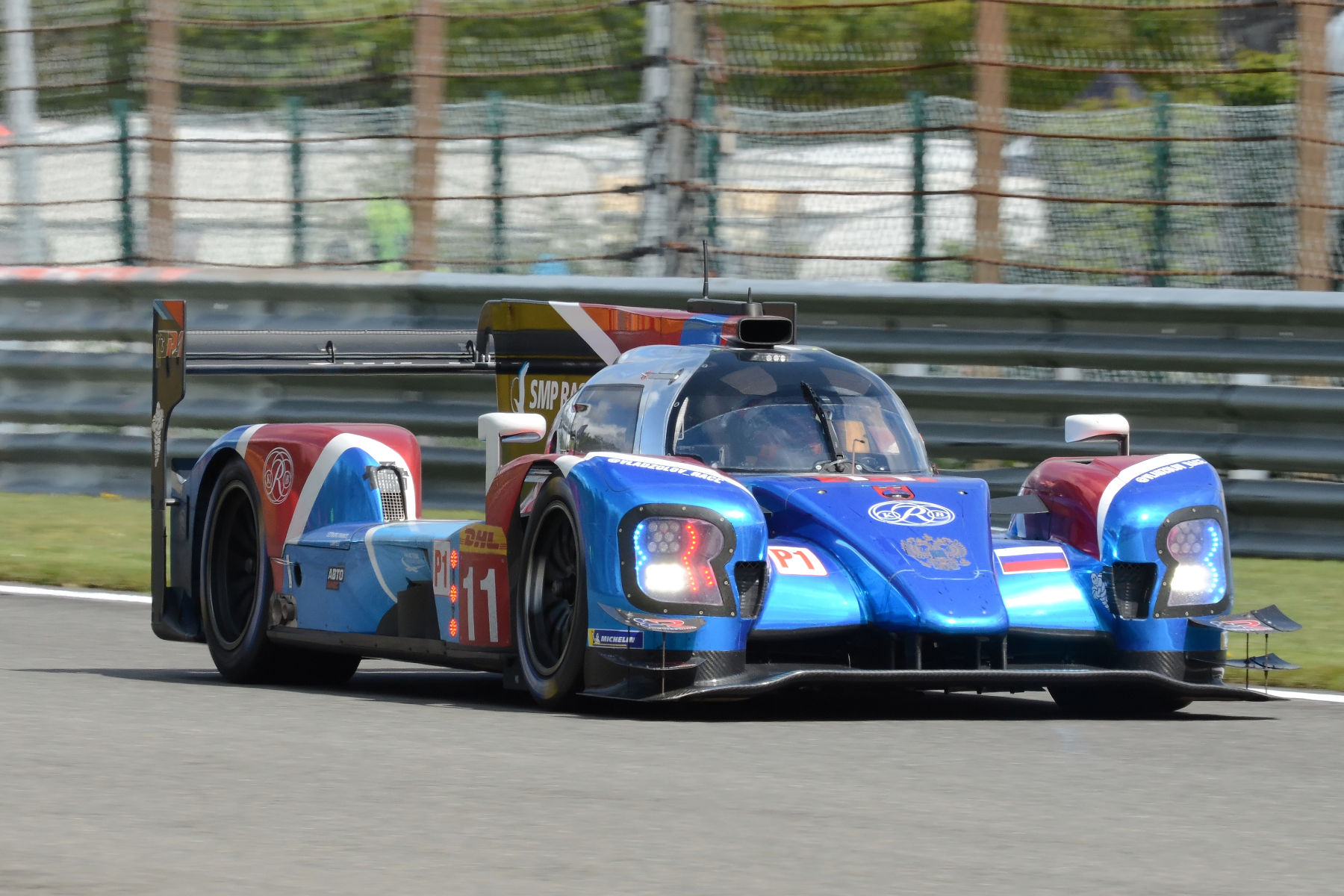
Vandoorne at the 2019 6 Hours of Spa-Francorchamps

==== 2019 ====
In April 2019, it was announced that Vandoorne would compete for two races in the WEC for 2018-2019 for SMP Racing. He would drive the Russian BR1 No.11 prototype along with Vitaly Petrov and Mikhail Aleshin in the 6 Hours of Spa-Francorchamps and the 24 Hours of Le Mans. In the 6 Hours of Spa-Francorchamps, Vandoorne, alongside Petrov and Aleshin, finished third place in the LMP1 Class. Vandoorne drove the first stint during weather conditions of snow, hail and rain. At the 24 hour of Le Mans, he finished third place.

==== 2022 ====
Vandoorne was set to test the 2023 Peugeot Hypercar at the Bahrain International Circuit during November 2022, but was not able to take part in it after being diagnosed with appendicitis.

==== 2023 ====
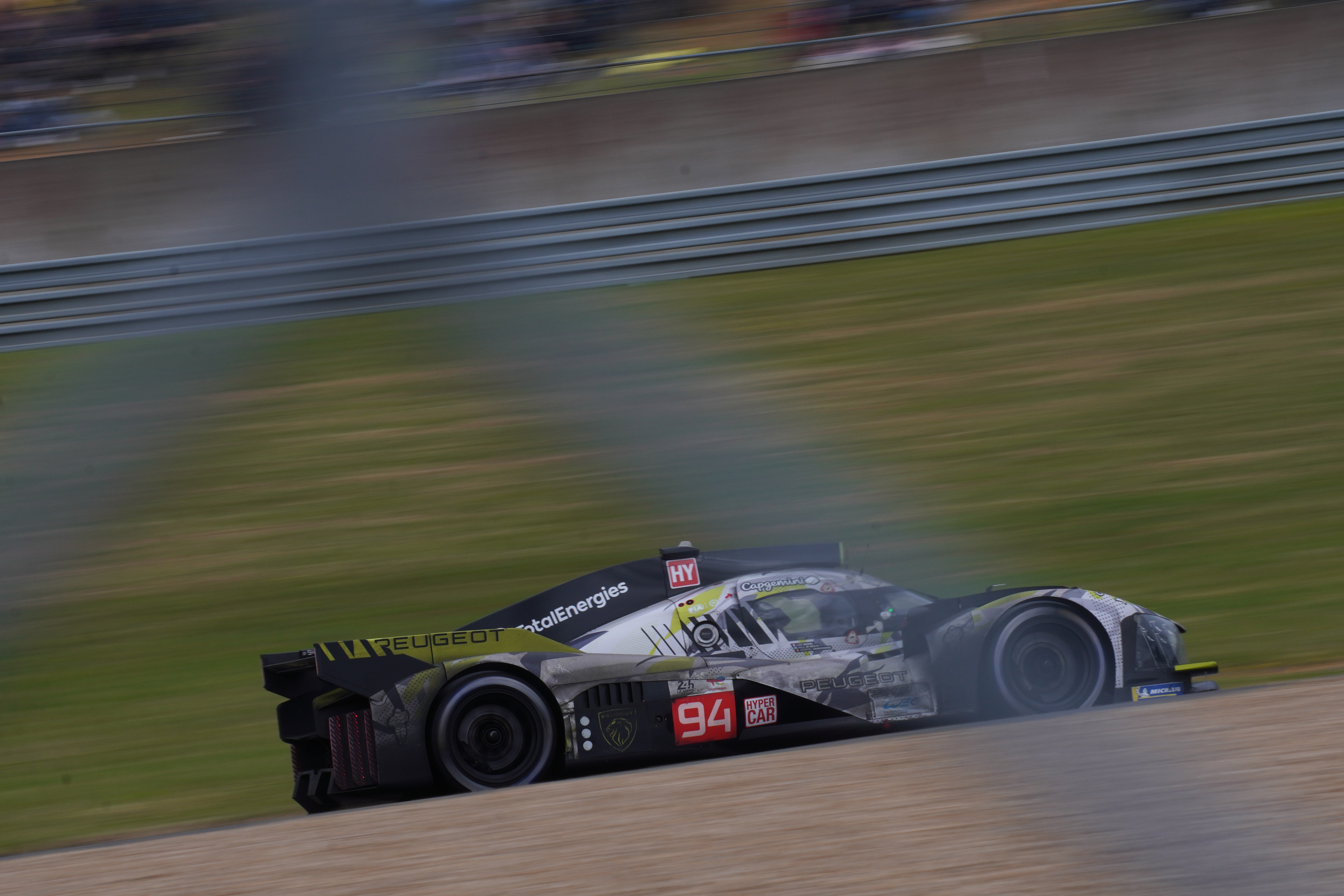
The #94 Peugeot 9X8 driven by Vandoorne, Di Resta and Duval at the 2024 24 Hours of Le Mans

For 2023, Vandoorne was appointed as the reserve driver for the Peugeot Sport in the Hypercar category. However, he replaced an injured Nico Müller at Peugeot for the 6 Hours of Fuji, where he finished in seventh place.

==== 2024 ====
Vandoorne would race with Peugeot Sport full-time in the 2024 FIA World Endurance Championship alongside Nico Müller and Loïc Duval.

==== 2026 ====
On 11 September 2025, Peugeot announced that Vandoorne's contract with their Hypercar programme would expire after the 6 Hours of Fuji, and he would leave and be replaced by Théo Pourchaire for the final round in Bahrain. However, Peugeot announced the following month that Vandoorne was renewed for the 2026 season.

Vandoorne is set to leave the team following the 6 Hours of Fuji as he prepares to make his return to Formula E.

== Other racing ==
=== IndyCar ===
On 17 November 2021, it was announced that Vandoorne would take part in an IndyCar Series test with Arrow McLaren SP at Sebring International Raceway on 6 December 2021.

== Personal life ==
Vandoorne has been in a relationship with artist Anna de Ferran since 2018.

== Karting record ==
=== Karting career summary ===
Season	Series	Team	Position
2008	French Championship — KF2	VDK Racing	13th
2008	Belgian Championship — KF2	VDK Racing	1st
2009	CIK-FIA European Championship — KF2	VDK Racing	23rd
2009	CIK-FIA World Cup — KF2	VDK Racing	2nd
2009	WSK International Series — KF2	VDK Racing	22nd
2010	Racehall of Champions — 80 kg		12th
2012	Racehall of Champions — 80 kg		1st

== Racing record ==
=== Racing career summary ===
Season	Series	Team	Races	Wins	Poles	F/Laps	Podiums	Points	Position
2010	F4 Eurocup 1.6	Auto Sport Academy	14	5	5	4	9	151	**1st**
2011	Eurocup Formula Renault 2.0	KTR	14	0	0	0	1	93	5th
2011	Formula Renault 2.0 NEC	KTR	20	0	3	0	8	328	**3rd**
2012	Eurocup Formula Renault 2.0	Josef Kaufmann Racing	14	4	6	3	11	244	**1st**
2012	Formula Renault 2.0 NEC	Josef Kaufmann Racing	7	5	4	5	6	176	9th
2013	Formula Renault 3.5 Series	Fortec Motorsport	17	4	3	2	10	214	**2nd**
2013	FIA GT Series	Boutsen Ginion Racing	2	0	0	0	0	0	NC†
2014	GP2 Series	ART Grand Prix	22	4	4	3	10	229	**2nd**
2014	Formula One	McLaren F1 Team	Third driver						
2015	GP2 Series	ART Grand Prix	21	7	4	7	16	341.5	**1st**
2015	Formula One	McLaren F1 Team	Test driver						
2016	Super Formula	Docomo Team Dandelion Racing	9	2	1	0	3	27	4th
2016	Formula One	McLaren Honda	1	0	0	0	0	1	20th
2017	Formula One	McLaren Honda	20	0	0	0	0	13	16th
2018	Formula One	McLaren F1 Team	21	0	0	0	0	12	16th
2018–19	Formula E	HWA Racelab	13	0	1	0	1	35	16th
2018–19	FIA World Endurance Championship	SMP Racing	2	0	0	0	2	38	11th
2019	24 Hours of Le Mans	SMP Racing	1	0	0	0	1	N/A	**3rd**
2019–20	Formula E	Mercedes-Benz EQ Formula E Team	11	1	1	1	3	87	**2nd**
2020	Formula One	Mercedes-AMG Petronas F1 Team	Reserve driver						
2020	Formula One	McLaren F1 Team	Reserve driver						
2020–21	Formula E	Mercedes-EQ Formula E Team	15	1	3	2	3	82	9th
2021	FIA World Endurance Championship - LMP2	Jota Sport	6	0	2	1	5	131	**2nd**
2021	Asian Le Mans Series - LMP2	Jota Sport	2	0	0	0	1	28	8th
2021	24 Hours of Le Mans - LMP2	Jota Sport	1	0	0	0	1	N/A	**2nd**
2021	Formula One	Mercedes-AMG Petronas F1 Team	Reserve driver						
2021	Formula One	McLaren F1 Team	Reserve driver						
2021–22	Formula E	Mercedes-EQ Formula E Team	16	1	2	1	8	213	**1st**
2022	IMSA SportsCar Championship - DPi	Meyer Shank Racing with Curb-Agajanian	1	0	0	0	0	N/A	21st
2022	Formula One	Mercedes-AMG Petronas F1 Team	Reserve driver						
2022	Formula One	McLaren F1 Team	Reserve driver						
2022–23	Formula E	DS Penske	16	0	1	0	0	56	11th
2023	FIA World Endurance Championship - Hypercar	Peugeot TotalEnergies	1	0	0	0	0	6	15th
2023	Formula One	Aston Martin Aramco Cognizant F1 Team	Test/Reserve driver						
2023	Formula One	McLaren F1 Team	Reserve driver						
2023–24	Formula E	DS Penske	16	0	0	0	1	61	10th
2024	FIA World Endurance Championship - Hypercar	Peugeot TotalEnergies	7	0	0	0	0	4	29th
2024	Formula One	Aston Martin Aramco F1 Team	Test/Reserve driver						
2024–25	Formula E	Maserati MSG Racing	16	1	0	0	1	62	14th
2025	FIA World Endurance Championship - Hypercar	Peugeot TotalEnergies	6	0	0	0	1	18	23rd
2025	Formula One	Aston Martin Aramco F1 Team	Test/Reserve driver						
2025–26	Formula E	Jaguar TCS Racing	Reserve driver						
2026	FIA World Endurance Championship - Hypercar	Peugeot TotalEnergies	6	0	0	1	0	6	24th
2026	Formula One	Aston Martin Aramco F1 Team	Test/Reserve driver						
2026–27	Formula E	Jaguar TCS Racing	0	0	0	0	0	0	TBD

^{†} As Vandoorne was a guest driver he was ineligible to score points.
^{*} Season still in progress.

=== Complete F4 Eurocup 1.6 results ===
(key) (Races in bold indicate pole position) (Races in italics indicate fastest lap)

Year	1	2	3	4	5	6	7	8	9	10	11	12	13	14	Pos	Points
2010	ALC; 1; 2	**ALC**; **2**; 1	**SPA**; **1**; 1	**SPA**; **2**; 1	MAG; 1; 2	MAG; 2; 1	HUN; 1; 16	HUN; 2; 4	**HOC**; **1**; 1	**HOC**; **2**; 1	SIL; 1; 4	SIL; 2; 2	CAT; 1; 4	CAT; 2; 4	1st	159

=== Complete Formula Renault 2.0 Northern European Cup results ===
(key) (Races in bold indicate pole position) (Races in italics indicate fastest lap)

Year	Entrant	1	2	3	4	5	6	7	8	9	10	11	12	13	14	15	16	17	18	19	20	Pos	Points
2011	KTR	HOC; 1; 4	HOC; 2; 4	HOC; 3; 2	SPA; 1; 15	SPA; 2 Ret	NÜR; 1; 6	NÜR; 2; 3	ASS; 1; 8	**ASS**; **2**; 3	ASS; 3; 17	OSC; 1; 2	**OSC**; **2**; 2	ZAN; 1; 3	ZAN; 2; 4	MST; 1; 3	MST; 2; 11	MST; 3; 8	MNZ; 1; 6	MNZ; 2; 4	**MNZ**; **3**; 2	3rd	328
2012	Josef Kaufmann Racing	**HOC**; **1**; 1	**HOC**; **2**; 19	HOC; 3; 1	**NÜR**; **1**; 1	**NÜR**; **2**; 1	OSC; 1	OSC; 2	OSC; 3	ASS; 1	ASS; 2	RBR; 1; 2	RBR; 2; 1	MST; 1	MST; 2	MST; 3	ZAN; 1	ZAN; 2	ZAN; 3	SPA; 1	SPA; 2	9th	176

=== Complete Eurocup Formula Renault 2.0 results ===
(key) (Races in bold indicate pole position) (Races in italics indicate fastest lap)

Year	Entrant	1	2	3	4	5	6	7	8	9	10	11	12	13	14	Pos	Points
2011	KTR	ALC; 1 Ret	ALC; 2 Ret	SPA; 1; 15	SPA; 2 Ret	NÜR; 1; 20	NÜR; 2; 7	HUN; 1; 4	HUN; 2; 3	SIL; 1; 4	SIL; 2; 4	LEC; 1; 6	LEC; 2; 5	CAT; 1; 5	CAT; 2; 6	5th	93
2012	Josef Kaufmann Racing	ALC; 1; 3	ALC; 2; 4	SPA; 1; 2	SPA; 2; 3	**NÜR**; **1**; 1	**NÜR**; **2**; 1	**MSC**; **1**; 2	**MSC**; **2**; 2	**HUN**; **1**; 1	HUN; 2; 4	LEC; 1; 1	**LEC**; **2**; 2	CAT; 1; 2	CAT; 2 Ret	1st	244

=== Complete Formula Renault 3.5 Series results ===
(key) (Races in bold indicate pole position) (Races in italics indicate fastest lap)

Year	Team	1	2	3	4	5	6	7	8	9	10	11	12	13	14	15	16	17	Pos	Points
2013	Fortec Motorsport	**MNZ**; **1**; 1	MNZ; 2; 3	ALC; 1; 8	ALC; 2; 3	MON; 1; 9	SPA; 1; 13	SPA; 2; 1	**MSC**; **1**; 1	**MSC**; **2**; 1	RBR; 1 Ret	RBR; 2 Ret	HUN; 1; 4	HUN; 2; 2	LEC; 1; 2	LEC; 2 Ret	CAT; 1; 3	CAT; 2; 2	2nd	214

=== Complete GP2 Series results ===
(key) (Races in bold indicate pole position) (Races in italics indicate fastest lap)

Year	Entrant	1	2	3	4	5	6	7	8	9	10	11	12	13	14	15	16	17	18	19	20	21	22	DC	Points
2014	ART Grand Prix	BHR; FEA; 1	BHR; SPR; 22	CAT; FEA; 13	CAT; SPR; 10	MON; FEA; 14	MON; SPR; 13	RBR; FEA; 2	RBR; SPR; 15	SIL; FEA; 3	SIL; SPR; 9	HOC; FEA; 2	HOC; SPR; 3	HUN; FEA; 7	HUN; SPR; 1	**SPA**; **FEA**; 2	SPA; SPR; 6	**MNZ**; **FEA**; 1	MNZ; SPR; 13	**SOC**; **FEA**; 5	SOC; SPR; 2	**YMC**; **FEA**; 1	YMC; SPR; 5	2nd	229
2015	ART Grand Prix	**BHR**; **FEA**; 1	BHR; SPR; 2	**CAT**; **FEA**; 1	CAT; SPR; 2	MON; FEA; 1	MON; SPR; 8	**RBR**; **FEA**; 1	RBR; SPR; 2	SIL; FEA; 3	SIL; SPR; 9	HUN; FEA; 5	HUN; SPR; 2	**SPA**; **FEA**; 1	SPA; SPR; 4	MNZ; FEA; 2	MNZ; SPR; 3	SOC; FEA; 3	SOC; SPR; 4	BHR; FEA; 1	BHR; SPR; 2	YMC; FEA; 1	YMC; SPR; C	1st	341.5

=== Complete Super Formula results ===
(key) (Races in bold indicate pole position) (Races in italics indicate fastest lap)

Year	Entrant	Engine	1	2	3	4	5	6	7	8	9	DC	Points
2016	Docomo Team Dandelion Racing	Honda	SUZ; 3	OKA; 12	**FUJ**; Ret	MOT; 6	OKA; 1	OKA; 7	SUG; 6	SUZ; 17	SUZ; 1	4th	27

=== Complete Formula One results ===
(key) (Races in bold indicate pole position; races in italics indicate fastest lap)

Year	Entrant	Chassis	Engine	1	2	3	4	5	6	7	8	9	10	11	12	13	14	15	16	17	18	19	20	21	WDC	Points
2016	McLaren Honda	McLaren MP4-31	Honda RA616H 1.6 V6 t	AUS	BHR; 10	CHN	RUS	ESP	MON	CAN	EUR	AUT	GBR	HUN	GER	BEL	ITA	SIN	MAL	JPN	USA	MEX	BRA	ABU	20th	1
2017	McLaren Honda	McLaren MCL32	Honda RA617H 1.6 V6 t	AUS; 13	CHN; Ret	BHR; DNS	RUS; 14	ESP; Ret	MON; Ret	CAN; 14	AZE; 12	AUT; 12	GBR; 11	HUN; 10	BEL; 14	ITA; Ret	SIN; 7	MAL; 7	JPN; 14	USA; 12	MEX; 12	BRA; Ret	ABU; 12		16th	13
2018	McLaren F1 Team	McLaren MCL33	Renault R.E.18 1.6 V6 t	AUS; 9	BHR; 8	CHN; 13	AZE; 9	ESP; Ret	MON; 14	CAN; 16	FRA; 12	AUT; 15^{†}	GBR; 11	GER; 13	HUN; Ret	BEL; 15	ITA; 12	SIN; 12	RUS; 16	JPN; 15	USA; 11	MEX; 8	BRA; 15	ABU; 14	16th	12

^{†} Did not finish, but was classified as he had completed more than 90% of the race distance.

=== Complete Formula E results ===
(key) (Races in bold indicate pole position; races in italics indicate fastest lap)

Year	Team	Chassis	Powertrain	1	2	3	4	5	6	7	8	9	10	11	12	13	14	15	16	Pos	Points
2018–19	HWA Racelab	Spark SRT05e	Venturi VFE05	ADR; 16	MRK; Ret	SCL; Ret	MEX; 18	**HKG**; Ret	SYX; Ret	RME; 3	PAR; Ret	MCO; 9	BER; 5	BRN; 10	NYC; 13	NYC; 8				16th	35
2019–20	Mercedes-Benz EQ Formula E Team	Spark SRT05e	Mercedes-Benz EQ Silver Arrow 01	DIR; 3	DIR; 3	SCL; 6	MEX; NC	MRK; 15	BER; 6	BER; 5	BER; Ret	BER; 12	BER; 9	**BER**; 1						2nd	87
2020–21	Mercedes-EQ Formula E Team	Spark SRT05e	Mercedes-EQ Silver Arrow 02	DIR; 8	DIR; 13	**RME**; Ret	RME; 1	VLC; 3	VLC; Ret	MCO; Ret	PUE; 7	PUE; 13	NYC; Ret	NYC; 12	LDN; 7	**LDN**; 15	BER; 12	**BER**; 3		9th	82
2021–22	Mercedes-EQ Formula E Team	Spark SRT05e	Mercedes-EQ Silver Arrow 02	**DRH**; 2	DRH; 7	MEX; 11	**RME**; 3	RME; 5	MCO; 1	BER; 3	BER; 3	JAK; 5	MRK; 8	NYC; 4	NYC; 2	LDN; 2	LDN; 4	SEO; 5	SEO; 2	1st	213
2022–23	DS Penske	Formula E Gen3	DS E-Tense FE23	MEX; 10	DRH; 11	DRH; 20	HYD; 8	CAP; 7	**SAP**; 6	BER; Ret	BER; 8	MCO; 9	JAK; 4	JAK; 9	POR; 12	RME; 11	RME; 8	LDN; 11	LDN; 5	11th	56
2023–24	DS Penske	Formula E Gen3	DS E-Tense FE23	MEX; 8	DRH; 14	DRH; 5	SAP; 8	TOK; 16	MIS; 8	MIS; Ret	MCO; 3	BER; 7	BER; 20	SIC; 9	SIC; 6	POR; 9	POR; 11	LDN; 9	LDN; 8	10th	61
2024–25	Maserati MSG Racing	Formula E Gen3 Evo	Maserati Tipo Folgore	SAO; 10	MEX; 7	JED; 10	JED; 6	MIA; 14	MCO; 9	MCO; 10	TKO; 1	TKO; 19	SHA; 11	SHA; 7	JKT; Ret	BER; 12	BER; 13	LDN; 4	LDN; 12	14th	62

^{*} Season still in progress.

=== Complete FIA World Endurance Championship results ===
(key) (Races in bold indicate pole position; races in italics indicate fastest lap)

Year	Entrant	Class	Chassis	Engine	1	2	3	4	5	6	7	8	Rank	Points
2018–19	SMP Racing	LMP1	BR Engineering BR1	AER P60B 2.4 L Turbo V6	SPA	LMS	SIL	FUJ	SHA	SEB	SPA; 3	LMS; 3	11th	38
2021	Jota Sport	LMP2	Oreca 07	Gibson GK428 4.2 L V8	SPA; 3	**ALG**; 2	MNZ; 5	LMS; 2	**BHR**; 2	BHR; 3			2nd	131
2023	Peugeot TotalEnergies	Hypercar	Peugeot 9X8	Peugeot X6H 2.6 L Turbo V6	SEB	ALG	SPA	LMS	MNZ	FUJ; 7	BHR		15th	6
2024	Peugeot TotalEnergies	Hypercar	Peugeot 9X8	Peugeot X6H 2.6 L Turbo V6	QAT; 15	IMO; 15	SPA	LMS; 11	SÃO; 16	COA; Ret	FUJ; 8	BHR; Ret	29th	4
2025	Peugeot TotalEnergies	Hypercar	Peugeot 9X8	Peugeot X6H 2.6 L Turbo V6	QAT; 12	IMO; 12	SPA; Ret	LMS; 10	SÃO	COA; 3	FUJ; 10	BHR	23rd	18
2026	Peugeot TotalEnergies	Hypercar	Peugeot 9X8	Peugeot X6H 2.6 L Turbo V6	IMO; 16	SPA; 7	LMS; 11	SÃO; 16	COA; 16	FUJ; Ret	CAT	MNZ	24th	6

=== Complete 24 Hours of Le Mans results ===
Year	Team	Co-Drivers	Car	Class	Laps	Pos.	Class Pos.
2019	(Russia) SMP Racing	(Russia) Mikhail Aleshin (Russia) Vitaly Petrov	BR Engineering BR1-AER	LMP1	379	**3rd**	**3rd**
2021	(United Kingdom) Jota Sport	(United Kingdom) Tom Blomqvist (Indonesia) Sean Gelael	Oreca 07-Gibson	LMP2	363	7th	**2nd**
2024	(France) Peugeot TotalEnergies	(United Kingdom) Paul di Resta (France) Loïc Duval	Peugeot 9X8	Hypercar	309	11th	11th
2025	(France) Peugeot TotalEnergies	(France) Loïc Duval (Denmark) Malthe Jakobsen	Peugeot 9X8	Hypercar	384	11th	11th
2026	(France) Peugeot TotalEnergies	(New Zealand) Nick Cassidy (United Kingdom) Paul di Resta	Peugeot 9X8	Hypercar	376	12th	12th

=== Complete IMSA SportsCar Championship results ===
(key) (Races in bold indicate pole position; races in italics indicate fastest lap)

Year	Entrant	No.	Class	Make	Engine	1	2	3	4	5	6	7	8	9	10	Rank	Points
2022	Meyer Shank Racing w/ Curb-Agajanian	60	DPi	Acura ARX-05	Acura AR35TT 3.5 L Turbo V6	DAY	SEB; 5	LBH	LGA	MDO	DET	WGL	MOS	ELK	PET	21st	285

== Notes ==
Sporting positions
Preceded by Benjamin Bailly	F4 Eurocup 1.6; Champion; 2010	Succeeded by Matthieu Vaxivière
Preceded by Robin Frijns	Eurocup Formula Renault 2.0; Champion; 2012	Succeeded by Pierre Gasly
Preceded by Jolyon Palmer	GP2 Series; Champion; 2015	Succeeded by Pierre Gasly
Preceded by Nyck de Vries	Formula E Champion; 2021–22	Succeeded by Jake Dennis
