= 2015 Yas Marina GP2 Series round =

Car racing competition

(United Arab Emirates) 2015 Yas Marina GP2 round
Round details
- Round 11 of 11 rounds in the 2015 GP2 Series
- Layout of the Yas Marina Circuit
- Location: Yas Marina Circuit, Abu Dhabi, United Arab Emirates
- Course: Permanent racing facility 5.554 km (3.451 mi)

GP2 Series

Feature race
- Date: 28 November 2015
- Laps: 31

Pole position
Driver	(France) Pierre Gasly	DAMS
- Time: 1:47.769

Podium
First	(Belgium) Stoffel Vandoorne	ART Grand Prix
Second	(Italy) Raffaele Marciello	Trident
Third	(New Zealand) Mitch Evans	Russian Time

Fastest lap
Driver	(France) Nathanaël Berthon	Daiko Team Lazarus
- Time: 1:51.866 (on lap 27)

Sprint race
- Date: 29 November 2015
- Laps: 22

Podium
First	Race cancelled	N/A
Second	Race cancelled	N/A
Third	Race cancelled	N/A

Fastest lap
Driver	Race cancelled	N/A
- Time: NC

The 2015 Yas Marina GP2 Series round was a GP2 Series motor race held on November 28 and 29, 2015 at Yas Marina Circuit, Abu Dhabi. It was the last race of the 2015 GP2 Series. The race supported the 2015 Abu Dhabi Grand Prix.

== Report ==
=== Sprint race ===
The race started in sunny conditions. Stoffel Vandoorne and René Binder stopped at the starting grid when the lights went out. Front row starters Alex Lynn and Rio Haryanto did enough to hold their spots in turn one. They were followed by Jordan King and Alexander Rossi but behind them Raffaele Marciello and Pierre Gasly touched, at the second corner causing Gasly to spin and Norman Nato unable to avoid him collecting Sean Gelael, Daniël de Jong, Nicholas Latifi and Artem Markelov, while Arthur Pic tried to avoid melee and hit Sergey Sirotkin. The race was stopped with a red flag immediately as the marshals tried to remove the four cars embedded in the techpro barrier.

Under the supervision of Formula One race director Charlie Whiting the cars were removed and repairs began taking place. Whiting however, who was taking photos of the damage at the scene, ultimately made the decision to cancel the race after just one lap, with the F1 drivers' parade less than half an hour away.

== Classification ==
=== Qualifying ===
Pos.	No.	Driver	Team	Time	Gap	Grid
1	1	(France) Pierre Gasly	DAMS	1:47.769		1
2	5	(Belgium) Stoffel Vandoorne	ART Grand Prix	1:47.866	+0.097	2
3	9	(New Zealand) Mitch Evans	Russian Time	1:48.014	+0.245	3
4	2	(United Kingdom) Alex Lynn	DAMS	1:48.049	+0.280	4
5	11	(Italy) Raffaele Marciello	Trident	1:48.419	+0.650	5
6	15	(Indonesia) Rio Haryanto	Campos Racing	1:48.429	+0.660	6
7	8	(United States) Alexander Rossi	Racing Engineering	1:48.598	+0.829	7
8	7	(United Kingdom) Jordan King	Racing Engineering	1:48.632	+0.863	8
9	6	(Japan) Nobuharu Matsushita	ART Grand Prix	1:48.699	+0.930	9
10	10	(Russia) Artem Markelov	Russian Time	1:48.743	+0.974	10
11	20	(Brazil) André Negrão	Arden International	1:48.822	+1.053	11
12	18	(Russia) Sergey Sirotkin	Rapax	1:48.981	+1.212	12
13	21	(France) Norman Nato	Arden International	1:49.105	+1.336	13
14	14	(France) Arthur Pic	Campos Racing	1:49.110	+1.341	14
15	27	(Spain) Sergio Canamasas	Daiko Team Lazarus	1:49,146	+1.377	15
16	3	(United Kingdom) Dean Stoneman	Carlin	1:49,166	+1.397	16
17	16	(Canada) Nicholas Latifi	MP Motorsport	1:49.350	+1.581	17
18	23	(United Kingdom) Oliver Rowland	Status Grand Prix	1:49.374	+1.605	18
19	17	(Austria) René Binder	MP Motorsport	1:49.661	+1.892	19
20	12	(Netherlands) Daniël de Jong	Trident	1:49.727	+1.958	20
21	26	(France) Nathanaël Berthon	Daiko Team Lazarus	1:49.779	+2.010	21
22	22	(Philippines) Marlon Stöckinger	Status Grand Prix	1:49.839	+2.070	22
23	19	(Sweden) Gustav Malja	Rapax	1:50.543	+2.774	23
24	4	(Indonesia) Sean Gelael	Carlin	1:51.604	+3.835	24

=== Feature race ===
Pos.	No.	Driver	Team	Laps	Time/Retired	Grid	Points
1	5	(Belgium) Stoffel Vandoorne	ART Grand Prix	31	1:03:32.405	2	25
2	11	(Italy) Raffaele Marciello	Trident	31	+9.404	5	18
3	9	(New Zealand) Mitch Evans	Russian Time	31	+10.327	3	15
4	8	(United States) Alexander Rossi	Racing Engineering	31	+12.105	7	12
5	1	(France) Pierre Gasly	DAMS	31	+22.621	1	10+4
6	7	(United Kingdom) Jordan King	Racing Engineering	31	+25.817	8	8
7	15	(Indonesia) Rio Haryanto	Campos Racing	31	+26.406	6	6
8	2	(United Kingdom) Alex Lynn	DAMS	31	+26.988	4	4
9	20	(Brazil) André Negrão	Arden International	31	+30.412	11	2
10	26	(France) Nathanaël Berthon	Daiko Team Lazarus	31	+36.974	21	1+2
11	6	(Japan) Nobuharu Matsushita	ART Grand Prix	31	+41.939	9	
12	27	(Spain) Sergio Canamasas	Daiko Team Lazarus	31	+43.105	15	
13	18	(Russia) Sergey Sirotkin	Rapax	31	+44.058	12	
14	17	(Austria) René Binder	MP Motorsport	31	+45.982	19	
15	23	(United Kingdom) Oliver Rowland	Status Grand Prix	31	+54.566	18	
16	19	(Sweden) Gustav Malja	Rapax	31	+1:00.592	23	
17	14	(France) Arthur Pic	Campos Racing	31	+1:02.596	14	
18	22	(Philippines) Marlon Stöckinger	Status Grand Prix	31	+1:20.398	22	
Ret	4	(Indonesia) Sean Gelael	Carlin	25	Accident	24	
Ret	3	(United Kingdom) Dean Stoneman	Carlin	23	Engine	16	
Ret	12	(Netherlands) Daniël de Jong	Trident	14	Engine	20	
Ret	10	(Russia) Artem Markelov	Russian Time	13	Engine	10	
Ret	21	(France) Norman Nato	Arden International	5	Accident	13	
Ret	16	(Canada) Nicholas Latifi	MP Motorsport	5	Accident	17	

== Final championship standings ==
Drivers' Championship standings

Pos	Driver	Points
1	(Belgium) Stoffel Vandoorne	341.5
2	(United States) Alexander Rossi	181.5
3	(Russia) Sergey Sirotkin	139
4	(Indonesia) Rio Haryanto	138
5	(New Zealand) Mitch Evans	135

Teams' Championship standings

Pos	Team	Points
1	(France) ART Grand Prix	410
2	(Spain) Racing Engineering	241.5
3	(France) DAMS	220
4	(Spain) Campos Racing	198
5	(Russia) Russian Time	183

- Note: Only the top five positions are included for both sets of standings.
- Note: Bold names include the Drivers' and Teams' Champion respectively.

== See also ==
- 2015 Abu Dhabi Grand Prix
- 2015 Yas Marina GP3 Series round

Previous round: 2015 Bahrain 2nd GP2 Series round	GP2 Series; 2015 season	Next round: 2016 Catalunya GP2 Series round
Previous round: 2014 Yas Marina GP2 Series round	Yas Marina GP2 round	Next round: 2016 Yas Marina GP2 Series round
