= 2015 GP2 Series =

Season of Formula One feeder championship

The 2015 GP2 Series season was the forty-ninth season of the second-tier of Formula One feeder championship and also eleventh season under the GP2 Series moniker, a championship for open-wheel racing cars run as a support series to the 2015 Formula One World Championship. Twenty-six drivers representing thirteen teams raced over eleven rounds, starting in Bahrain on 18 April and finishing in Abu Dhabi on 29 November.

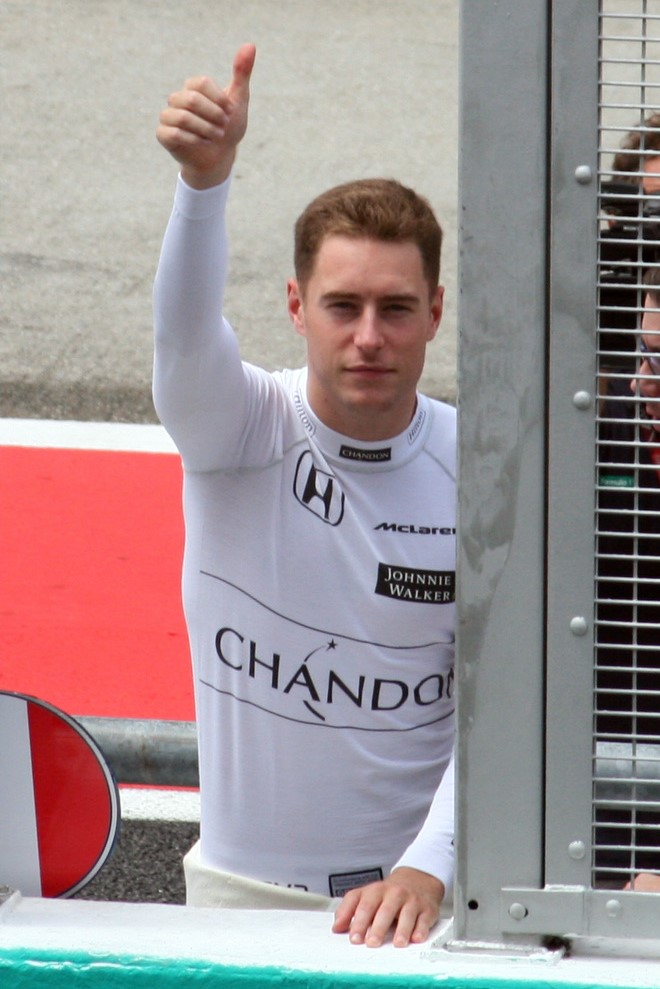
Stoffel Vandoorne (pictured in 2017), won the championship

== Rule changes ==
- The series continued to use the Dallara GP2/11 chassis first introduced in 2011, but introduced the Drag Reduction System (DRS), akin to that used in Formula One. The series used the same detection and activation points at each circuit as Formula One, and followed the same rules for activation, requiring drivers to be within one second of the car in front at the detection point for DRS to become available. The upper-element rear wing angle has a same angle as Formula One upper-element rear wing. In an event of rainy conditions, Drag Reduction Systems are automatically deactivated until the rain stopped.

== Teams and drivers ==
Team	No.	Drivers	Rounds
(France) DAMS	1	(France) Pierre Gasly	All
(France) DAMS	2	(United Kingdom) Alex Lynn	All
(United Kingdom) Carlin	3	(Colombia) Julián Leal	1–8
(United Kingdom) Carlin	3	(United Kingdom) Dean Stoneman	9–11
(United Kingdom) Carlin	4	(Denmark) Marco Sørensen	1–4
(United Kingdom) Carlin	4	(Venezuela) Johnny Cecotto Jr. (Note: Cecotto competed under a state Venezuelan racing licence.)	5
(United Kingdom) Carlin	4	(Indonesia) Sean Gelael	6–7, 9–11
(United Kingdom) Carlin	4	(United Kingdom) Jann Mardenborough	8
(France) ART Grand Prix	5	(Belgium) Stoffel Vandoorne	All
(France) ART Grand Prix	6	(Japan) Nobuharu Matsushita	All
(Spain) Racing Engineering	7	(United Kingdom) Jordan King	All
(Spain) Racing Engineering	8	(United States) Alexander Rossi	All
(Russia) Russian Time	9	(New Zealand) Mitch Evans	All
(Russia) Russian Time	10	(Russia) Artem Markelov	All
(Italy) Trident	11	(Italy) Raffaele Marciello	All
(Italy) Trident	12	(Austria) René Binder	1–6
(Italy) Trident	12	(Sweden) Gustav Malja	7
(Italy) Trident	12	(Venezuela) Johnny Cecotto Jr.	8–9
(Italy) Trident	12	(Netherlands) Daniël de Jong	10–11
(Spain) Campos Racing	14	(France) Arthur Pic	All
(Spain) Campos Racing	15	(Indonesia) Rio Haryanto	All
(Netherlands) MP Motorsport	16	(Spain) Sergio Canamasas	1–3
(Netherlands) MP Motorsport	16	(United Kingdom) Oliver Rowland	5, 7
(Netherlands) MP Motorsport	16	(Canada) Nicholas Latifi	6, 9–11
(Netherlands) MP Motorsport	16	(Netherlands) Meindert van Buuren	8
(Netherlands) MP Motorsport	17	(Netherlands) Daniël de Jong	1–7
(Netherlands) MP Motorsport	17	(Austria) René Binder	8–11
(Italy) Rapax	18	(Russia) Sergey Sirotkin	All
(Italy) Rapax	19	(Romania) Robert Vișoiu	1–9
(Italy) Rapax	19	(Sweden) Gustav Malja	10–11
(United Kingdom) Arden International	20	(Brazil) André Negrão	All
(United Kingdom) Arden International	21	(France) Norman Nato	All
(Canada) Status Grand Prix (Note: Status Grand Prix competed under a Canadian licence.)	22	(Philippines) Marlon Stöckinger	All
(Canada) Status Grand Prix	23	(New Zealand) Richie Stanaway	1–9
(Canada) Status Grand Prix	23	(United Kingdom) Oliver Rowland	10–11
(Germany) Hilmer Motorsport	24	(United Kingdom) Nick Yelloly	2–7
(Germany) Hilmer Motorsport	24	(Switzerland) Simon Trummer	8
(Germany) Hilmer Motorsport	25	(Venezuela) Johnny Cecotto Jr.	2–3
(Germany) Hilmer Motorsport	25	(Switzerland) Simon Trummer	4
(Germany) Hilmer Motorsport	25	(United Kingdom) Jon Lancaster	5
(Germany) Hilmer Motorsport	25	(Spain) Sergio Canamasas	6
(Venezuela) Lazarus (1–3) (Italy) Daiko Team Lazarus (Note: Daiko Team Lazarus competed under a state Venezuelan licence in rounds 1–5.) (4–11)	26	(France) Nathanaël Berthon	1–7, 9–11
(Venezuela) Lazarus (1–3) (Italy) Daiko Team Lazarus (4–11)	26	(Switzerland) Patric Niederhauser	8
(Venezuela) Lazarus (1–3) (Italy) Daiko Team Lazarus (4–11)	27	(Switzerland) Zoël Amberg	1–4, 6
(Venezuela) Lazarus (1–3) (Italy) Daiko Team Lazarus (4–11)	27	(Spain) Sergio Canamasas	5, 7–11

=== Team changes ===
- GP3 Series team Status Grand Prix expanded its operations to enter the GP2 Series, replacing Caterham Racing after team principal Teddy Yip reached an agreement with Caterham's Tony Fernandes to purchase the team at the end of the 2014 season.
- Russian Time ended its association with iSport International, with the responsibility for the team's operations taken over by Virtuosi Racing.

=== Driver changes ===
Changing teams

- René Binder moved from Arden International to Trident.
- Sergio Canamasas moved from Trident to MP Motorsport.
- Pierre Gasly, who raced for Caterham Racing, will switch to DAMS.
- Rio Haryanto switched from Caterham Racing to Campos Racing.
- Raffaele Marciello, who raced for Racing Engineering, will switch to Trident.
- Alexander Rossi, who raced for Caterham Racing and Campos Racing will move to Racing Engineering.
- Marco Sørensen, who raced for MP Motorsport, will switch to Carlin.
- Johnny Cecotto Jr., who raced for Trident, will switch to Hilmer Motorsport.

Entering GP2

- 2014 Formula Renault 3.5 Series driver Zoël Amberg will switch to the series, joining Lazarus.
- Jordan King, who previously competed in European Formula 3, will make his GP2 debut with Racing Engineering.
- GP3 Series champion Alex Lynn will graduate to the series with reigning champions DAMS.
- Nobuharu Matsushita, the 2014 All-Japan Formula Three champion, will make his GP2 debut with ART Grand Prix.
- Norman Nato, who previously competed in Formula Renault 3.5, will make his GP2 debut with Arden International.
- Sergey Sirotkin will move from the Formula Renault 3.5 series, to join the Rapax Team.
- Marlon Stöckinger, who raced for Status Grand Prix in the 2012 GP3 Series season, will return to the team after two seasons in the Formula Renault 3.5 Series.
- Robert Vișoiu will graduate to the series with Rapax.
- Richie Stanaway, who previously competed in GP3, will graduate to the series with Status.
- Nick Yelloly, who previously competed in GP3, will graduate to the series with Hilmer.

Leaving GP2

- 2014 season champion Jolyon Palmer will not return to defend his title as, under the series regulations, a driver is not allowed to continue in the series once they have won the championship. He has taken up duties as reserve driver for Lotus F1.
- Stéphane Richelmi left DAMS and the series to join the Blancpain Endurance Series and Blancpain Sprint Series with Belgian Audi Club Team WRT.
- Tom Dillmann, Tio Ellinas and Nicholas Latifi left the series to race with Carlin, Strakka Racing and Arden respectively in Formula Renault 3.5.
- Takuya Izawa left ART Grand Prix and the series to return to Super Formula and Super GT.
- Felipe Nasr left Carlin and the series to join the Sauber Formula One team.
- Stefano Coletti left GP2 to race in IndyCar with KV Racing Technology.
- Adrian Quaife-Hobbs left Rapax and the series to join the Blancpain Endurance Series with Von Ryan Racing.
- Daniel Abt left the series to race in Formula E with the Audi Sport Abt Formula E Team.

Mid-season changes

- Johnny Cecotto Jr. replaced Marco Sørensen at Carlin for the Silverstone round of the championship. Cecotto was replaced for the following round at the Hungaroring by Carlin regular Sean Gelael. Gelael due to his Formula Renault 3.5 Series obligations was replaced by the Carlin GP3 Series driver Jann Mardenborough at Monza.

== Calendar ==
In December 2014, the full 2015 calendar was revealed with eleven events.

Round		Circuit/Location	Country	Date	Supporting
1	Feature	Bahrain International Circuit, Sakhir	Bahrain	18 April	Bahrain Grand Prix
1	Sprint	Bahrain International Circuit, Sakhir	Bahrain	19 April	Bahrain Grand Prix
2	Feature	Circuit de Barcelona-Catalunya, Montmeló	Spain	9 May	Spanish Grand Prix
2	Sprint	Circuit de Barcelona-Catalunya, Montmeló	Spain	10 May	Spanish Grand Prix
3	Feature	Circuit de Monaco, Monaco	Monaco	22 May	Monaco Grand Prix
3	Sprint	Circuit de Monaco, Monaco	Monaco	23 May	Monaco Grand Prix
4	Feature	Red Bull Ring, Spielberg	Austria	20 June	Austrian Grand Prix
4	Sprint	Red Bull Ring, Spielberg	Austria	21 June	Austrian Grand Prix
5	Feature	Silverstone Circuit, Silverstone	United Kingdom	4 July	British Grand Prix
5	Sprint	Silverstone Circuit, Silverstone	United Kingdom	5 July	British Grand Prix
6	Feature	Hungaroring, Mogyoród	Hungary	25 July	Hungarian Grand Prix
6	Sprint	Hungaroring, Mogyoród	Hungary	26 July	Hungarian Grand Prix
7	Feature	Circuit de Spa-Francorchamps, Stavelot	Belgium	22 August	Belgian Grand Prix
7	Sprint	Circuit de Spa-Francorchamps, Stavelot	Belgium	23 August	Belgian Grand Prix
8	Feature	Autodromo Nazionale Monza, Monza	Italy	5 September	Italian Grand Prix
8	Sprint	Autodromo Nazionale Monza, Monza	Italy	6 September	Italian Grand Prix
9	Feature	Sochi Autodrom, Sochi	Russia	10 October	Russian Grand Prix
9	Sprint	Sochi Autodrom, Sochi	Russia	11 October	Russian Grand Prix
10	Feature	Bahrain International Circuit, Manama	Bahrain	20 November	6 Hours of Bahrain
10	Sprint	Bahrain International Circuit, Manama	Bahrain	21 November	6 Hours of Bahrain
11	Feature	Yas Marina Circuit, Abu Dhabi	United Arab Emirates	28 November	Abu Dhabi Grand Prix
11	Sprint	Yas Marina Circuit, Abu Dhabi	United Arab Emirates	29 November	Abu Dhabi Grand Prix

=== Calendar changes ===
- The series was scheduled to run in support of the German Grand Prix, at a venue that, at the time of the calendar's publication, had not yet been decided. With the cancellation of the German Grand Prix, the planned GP2 meeting was rescheduled to Bahrain International Circuit in the 2015 6 Hours of Bahrain weekend.

== Results ==
=== Summary ===
Round		Circuit	Pole position	Fastest Lap	Winning driver	Winning team	Report
1	F	Bahrain International Circuit	(Belgium) Stoffel Vandoorne	(Belgium) Stoffel Vandoorne	(Belgium) Stoffel Vandoorne	(France) ART Grand Prix	Report
1	S	Bahrain International Circuit		(Italy) Raffaele Marciello (Note: Raffaele Marciello set the fastest lap, but did not finish in the top 10, so was ineligible to be the point-scorer for the fastest lap. Nobuharu Matsushita was the point-scorer instead for setting the fastest lap of those finishing in the top 10.)	(Indonesia) Rio Haryanto	(Spain) Campos Racing	Report
2	F	(Spain) Circuit de Barcelona-Catalunya	(Belgium) Stoffel Vandoorne	(New Zealand) Mitch Evans	(Belgium) Stoffel Vandoorne	(France) ART Grand Prix	Report
2	S	(Spain) Circuit de Barcelona-Catalunya		(Belgium) Stoffel Vandoorne	(United Kingdom) Alex Lynn	(France) DAMS	Report
3	F	Circuit de Monaco	(United States) Alexander Rossi	(United Kingdom) Nick Yelloly	(Belgium) Stoffel Vandoorne	(France) ART Grand Prix	Report
3	S	Circuit de Monaco		(France) Norman Nato (Note: Norman Nato set the fastest lap, but did not finish in the top 10, so was ineligible to be the point-scorer for the fastest lap. Stoffel Vandoorne was the point-scorer instead for setting the fastest lap of those finishing in the top 10.)	(New Zealand) Richie Stanaway	(Canada) Status Grand Prix	Report
4	F	(Austria) Red Bull Ring	(Belgium) Stoffel Vandoorne	(United Kingdom) Alex Lynn	(Belgium) Stoffel Vandoorne	(France) ART Grand Prix	Report
4	S	(Austria) Red Bull Ring		(United Kingdom) Alex Lynn (Note: Alex Lynn set the fastest lap, but did not finish in the top 10, so was ineligible to be the point-scorer for the fastest lap. Jordan King was the point-scorer instead for setting the fastest lap of those finishing in the top 10.)	(Indonesia) Rio Haryanto	(Spain) Campos Racing	Report
5	F	(United Kingdom) Silverstone Circuit	(Russia) Sergey Sirotkin	(Russia) Sergey Sirotkin	(Russia) Sergey Sirotkin	(Italy) Rapax	Report
5	S	(United Kingdom) Silverstone Circuit		(Spain) Sergio Canamasas (Note: Sergio Canamasas set the fastest lap, but did not finish in the top 10, so was ineligible to be the point-scorer for the fastest lap. Rio Haryanto was the point-scorer instead for setting the fastest lap of those finishing in the top 10.)	(Indonesia) Rio Haryanto	(Spain) Campos Racing	Report
6	F	(Hungary) Hungaroring	(United Kingdom) Alex Lynn	(Romania) Robert Vișoiu	(United Kingdom) Alex Lynn	(France) DAMS	Report
6	S	(Hungary) Hungaroring		(Philippines) Marlon Stöckinger (Note: Marlon Stöckinger set the fastest lap, but did not finish in the top 10, so was ineligible to be the point-scorer for the fastest lap. Stoffel Vandoorne was the point-scorer instead for setting the fastest lap of those finishing in the top 10.)	(Japan) Nobuharu Matsushita	(France) ART Grand Prix	Report
7	F	(Belgium) Circuit de Spa-Francorchamps	(Belgium) Stoffel Vandoorne	(New Zealand) Richie Stanaway (Note: Richie Stanaway set the fastest lap, but did not finish in the top 10, so was ineligible to be the point-scorer for the fastest lap. Mitch Evans was the point-scorer instead for setting the fastest lap of those finishing in the top 10.)	(Belgium) Stoffel Vandoorne	(France) ART Grand Prix	Report
7	S	(Belgium) Circuit de Spa-Francorchamps		(Belgium) Stoffel Vandoorne	(United States) Alexander Rossi	(Spain) Racing Engineering	Report
8	F	(Italy) Autodromo Nazionale Monza	(France) Pierre Gasly	(Venezuela) Johnny Cecotto Jr. (Note: Johnny Cecotto Jr. set the fastest lap, but did not finish in the top 10, so was ineligible to be the point-scorer for the fastest lap. Norman Nato was the point-scorer instead for setting the fastest lap of those finishing in the top 10.)	(United States) Alexander Rossi	(Spain) Racing Engineering	Report
8	S	(Italy) Autodromo Nazionale Monza		(United Kingdom) Alex Lynn	(New Zealand) Mitch Evans	(Russia) Russian Time	Report
9	F	(Russia) Sochi Autodrom	(United Kingdom) Alex Lynn	(Belgium) Stoffel Vandoorne	(United States) Alexander Rossi	(Spain) Racing Engineering	Report
9	S	(Russia) Sochi Autodrom		(France) Nathanaël Berthon (Note: Nathanaël Berthon set the fastest lap, but did not finish in the top 10, so was ineligible to be the point-scorer for the fastest lap. Pierre Gasly was the point-scorer instead for setting the fastest lap of those finishing in the top 10.)	(New Zealand) Richie Stanaway	(Canada) Status Grand Prix	Report
10	F	Bahrain International Circuit	(France) Pierre Gasly	(Belgium) Stoffel Vandoorne	(Belgium) Stoffel Vandoorne	(France) ART Grand Prix	Report
10	S	Bahrain International Circuit		(Philippines) Marlon Stöckinger (Note: Marlon Stöckinger set the fastest lap, but did not finish in the top 10, so was ineligible to be the point-scorer for the fastest lap. Alex Lynn was the point-scorer instead for setting the fastest lap of those finishing in the top 10.)	(New Zealand) Mitch Evans	(Russia) Russian Time	Report
11	F	(United Arab Emirates) Yas Marina Circuit	(France) Pierre Gasly	(France) Nathanaël Berthon	(Belgium) Stoffel Vandoorne	(France) ART Grand Prix	Report
11	S	(United Arab Emirates) Yas Marina Circuit	Abandoned because of Lap 1 crash — insufficient number of laps completed.				Report

== Championship standings ==
Scoring system

Points were awarded to the top 10 classified finishers in the Feature race, and to the top 8 classified finishers in the Sprint race. The pole-sitter in the feature race also received four points, and two points were given to the driver who set the fastest lap inside the top ten in both the feature and sprint races. No extra points were awarded to the pole-sitter in the sprint race.

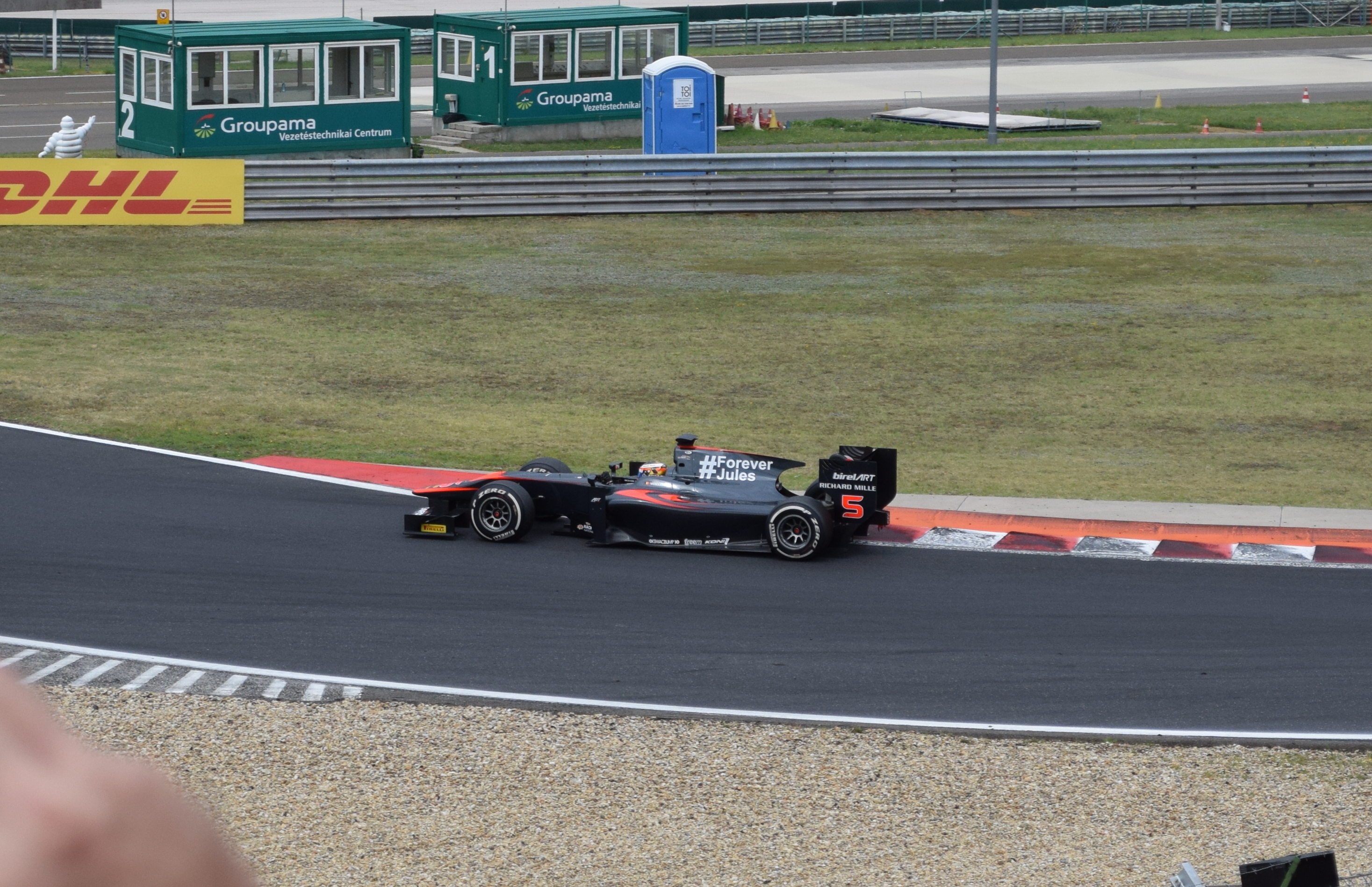
Series champion Stoffel Vandoorne at Hungary.

Feature race points

Position	**1st**	**2nd**	**3rd**	**4th**	**5th**	**6th**	**7th**	**8th**	**9th**	**10th**	**Pole**	**FL**
Points	25	18	15	12	10	8	6	4	2	1	4	2

Sprint race points

Points were awarded to the top 8 classified finishers.

Position	**1st**	**2nd**	**3rd**	**4th**	**5th**	**6th**	**7th**	**8th**	**FL**
Points	15	12	10	8	6	4	2	1	2

=== Drivers' championship ===
Due to a first lap accident resulting in barriers needing to be repaired, the first race at Sochi was shortened to 15 laps instead of the 28 originally scheduled, and as a result half points were awarded.

The second race at Yas Marina was cancelled after a first lap accident, during which four cars made contact with the barriers on the outside of turn 3. The race was red-flagged, then abandoned as the barriers were not sufficiently repaired in time to restart the race. As less than 2 laps were completed, no result was reached and no points were awarded.

Pos.	Driver	BHR1 (Bahrain)		CAT (Spain)		MON (Monaco)		RBR (Austria)		SIL (United Kingdom)		HUN (Hungary)		SPA (Belgium)		MNZ (Italy)		SOC (Russia)		BHR2 (Bahrain)		YMC (United Arab Emirates)		Points
1	(Belgium) Stoffel Vandoorne	**1**	2	**1**	2	1	8	**1**	2	3	9	5	2	**1**	4	2	3	3	4	1	2	1	C	341.5
2	(United States) Alexander Rossi	3	4	3	4	**2**	7	6	8	2	4	12	19	6	1	1	Ret	1	6	18	9	4	C	181.5
3	(Russia) Sergey Sirotkin	12	14	16	10	5	3	2	4	**1**	8	3	3	9	6	Ret	5	4	21	5	4	13	C	139
4	(Indonesia) Rio Haryanto	2	1	4	6	16	Ret	7	1	8	1	4	5	13	10	13	11	5	2	7	18	7	C	138
5	(New Zealand) Mitch Evans	6	17	2	DNS	Ret	DNS	10	5	Ret	20	17	22	5	3	3	1	11	8	3	1	3	C	135
6	(United Kingdom) Alex Lynn	19	15	5	1	13	11	3	20	5	6	**1**	9	11	8	Ret	10	**Ret**	10	8	3	8	C	110
7	(Italy) Raffaele Marciello	Ret	20	6	17	8	2	15	10	6	2	7	4	14	12	15	7	6	3	4	5	2	C	110
8	(France) Pierre Gasly	Ret	22	7	3	14	10	13	6	4	3	2	8	19	Ret	**Ret**	12	2	5	**6**	7	**5**	C	110
9	(Japan) Nobuharu Matsushita	10	6	11	18	Ret	19	4	3	Ret	19	8	1	Ret	15	Ret	15	10	7	2	Ret	11	C	68.5
10	(New Zealand) Richie Stanaway	15	11	10	19	7	1	23	15	Ret	13	21	13	18	13	4	4	7	1					60
11	(France) Arthur Pic	Ret	10	9	8	4	6	9	11	14	16	13	10	2	Ret	7	2	8	13	10	16	17	C	60
12	(United Kingdom) Jordan King	4	9	14	11	9	Ret	12	7	22†	10	6	12	8	2	8	Ret	Ret	15	9	6	6	C	60
13	(Russia) Artem Markelov	13	12	12	5	Ret	14	5	DSQ	21	14	22	18	3	5	5	14	Ret	12	15	8	Ret	C	48
14	(Colombia) Julián Leal	8	5	Ret	16	6	5	14	22	9	12	16	15	4	11	12	9							38
15	(Spain) Sergio Canamasas	14	Ret	13	15	3	4			15	24	Ret	16	12	9	11	6	Ret	17	12	17	12	C	27
16	(France) Nathanaël Berthon	7	3	20	12	17	15	Ret	17	Ret	21	14	11	7	7			14	19	11	Ret	10	C	27
17	(Romania) Robert Vișoiu	5	7	18	23	15	13	11	9	12	11	9	7	15	16	9	Ret	17	18					20
18	(France) Norman Nato	Ret	16	8	7	18	21	20	13	18	23	11	6	Ret	20	6	Ret	12	9	24	10	Ret	C	20
19	(United Kingdom) Nick Yelloly			Ret	14	10	9	8	Ret	7	5	Ret	17	Ret	17									19
20	(Brazil) André Negrão	9	8	23†	21	21	17	16	21	20	15	20	21	20	14	14	18	15	11	17	20	9	C	5
21	(United Kingdom) Oliver Rowland									10	7			NC	Ret					22	Ret	15	C	3
22	(Austria) René Binder	17	Ret	22	Ret	11	16	17	14	17	18	23	24			10	8	16	Ret	20	Ret	14	C	2
23	(Netherlands) Daniël de Jong	18	13	15	9	12	12	21	12	11	26†	10	Ret	Ret	DNS					19	14	Ret	C	1
24	(United Kingdom) Dean Stoneman																	9	16	21	12	Ret	C	1
25	(Sweden) Gustav Malja													10	18					16	13	16	C	1
26	(Philippines) Marlon Stöckinger	11	19	Ret	20	19	18	19	19	19	22	19	23	17	19	Ret	19	Ret	Ret	13	19	18	C	0
27	(Canada) Nicholas Latifi											15	14					18	14	14	11	Ret	C	0
28	(Venezuela) Johnny Cecotto Jr.			21	Ret	20	Ret			13	25					18	13	13	22†					0
29	(Switzerland) Zoël Amberg	16	18	17	13	22	Ret	DNS	DNS			DNS	DNS											0
30	(Indonesia) Sean Gelael											18	20	20	21			19	20	23	15	Ret	C	0
31	(Switzerland) Simon Trummer							22	18							16	16							0
32	(United Kingdom) Jon Lancaster									16	17													0
33	(Denmark) Marco Sørensen	Ret	21	19	22	Ret	20	18	16															0
34	(Switzerland) Patric Niederhauser															17	17							0
35	(United Kingdom) Jann Mardenborough															19	20							0
—	(Netherlands) Meindert van Buuren															Ret	DNS							0
Pos.	Driver	BHR1 (Bahrain)		CAT (Spain)		MON (Monaco)		RBR (Austria)		SIL (United Kingdom)		HUN (Hungary)		SPA (Belgium)		MNZ (Italy)		SOC (Russia)		BHR2 (Bahrain)		YMC (United Arab Emirates)		Points

Key
Colour	Result
Gold	Winner
Silver	2nd place
Bronze	3rd place
Green	Other points position
Blue	Other classified position
Blue	Not classified, finished (NC)
Purple	Not classified, retired (Ret)
Red	Did not qualify (DNQ)
Red	Did not pre-qualify (DNPQ)
Black	Disqualified (DSQ)
White	Did not start (DNS)
White	Race cancelled (C)
Blank	Did not practice (DNP)
Blank	Excluded (EX)
Blank	Did not arrive (DNA)
Blank	Withdrawn (WD)
Text formatting	Meaning
**Bold**	Pole position point(s)
Italics	Fastest lap point(s)

Notes:

- † — Drivers did not finish the race, but were classified as they completed over 90% of the race distance.

=== Teams' championship ===
Pos.	Team	No.	BHR1 (Bahrain)		CAT (Spain)		MON (Monaco)		RBR (Austria)		SIL (United Kingdom)		HUN (Hungary)		SPA (Belgium)		MNZ (Italy)		SOC (Russia)		BHR2 (Bahrain)		YMC (United Arab Emirates)		Points
1	(France) ART Grand Prix	5	**1**	2	**1**	2	1	8	**1**	2	3	9	5	2	**1**	4	2	3	3	4	1	2	1	C	410
1	(France) ART Grand Prix	6	10	6	11	18	Ret	19	4	3	Ret	19	8	1	Ret	15	Ret	15	10	7	2	Ret	11	C	410
2	(Spain) Racing Engineering	7	4	9	14	11	9	Ret	12	7	22†	10	6	12	8	2	8	Ret	Ret	15	9	6	6	C	241.5
2	(Spain) Racing Engineering	8	3	4	3	4	**2**	7	6	8	2	4	12	19	6	1	1	Ret	1	6	18	9	4	C	241.5
3	(France) DAMS	1	Ret	22	7	3	14	10	13	6	4	3	2	8	19	Ret	**Ret**	12	2	5	**6**	7	**5**	C	220
3	(France) DAMS	2	19	15	5	1	13	11	3	20	5	6	**1**	9	11	8	Ret	10	**Ret**	10	8	3	8	C	220
4	(Spain) Campos Racing	14	Ret	10	9	8	4	6	9	11	14	16	13	10	2	Ret	7	2	8	13	10	16	17	C	198
4	(Spain) Campos Racing	15	2	1	4	6	16	Ret	7	1	8	1	4	5	13	10	13	11	5	2	7	18	7	C	198
5	(Russia) Russian Time	9	6	17	2	DNS	Ret	DNS	10	5	Ret	20	17	22	5	3	3	1	11	8	3	1	3	C	183
5	(Russia) Russian Time	10	13	12	12	5	Ret	14	5	DSQ	21	14	22	18	3	5	5	14	Ret	12	15	8	Ret	C	183
6	(Italy) Rapax	18	12	14	16	10	5	3	2	4	**1**	8	3	3	9	6	Ret	5	4	21	5	4	14	C	159
6	(Italy) Rapax	19	5	7	18	23	15	13	11	9	12	11	9	7	15	16	9	Ret	17	18	16	13	16	C	159
7	(Italy) Trident	11	Ret	20	6	17	8	2	15	10	6	2	7	4	14	12	15	7	6	3	4	5	2	C	111
7	(Italy) Trident	12	17	Ret	22	Ret	11	16	17	14	17	18	23	24	10	18	18	13	13	22†	19	14	Ret	C	111
8	(Canada) Status Grand Prix	22	11	19	Ret	20	19	18	19	19	19	22	19	23	17	19	Ret	19	Ret	Ret	13	19	18	C	60
8	(Canada) Status Grand Prix	23	15	11	10	19	7	1	23	15	Ret	13	21	13	18	13	4	4	7	1	22	Ret	16	C	60
9	(United Kingdom) Carlin	3	8	5	Ret	16	6	5	14	22	9	12	16	15	4	11	12	9	9	16	21	12	Ret	C	39
9	(United Kingdom) Carlin	4	Ret	21	19	22	Ret	20	18	16	13	25	18	20	20	21	19	20	19	20	23	15	Ret	C	39
10	(Venezuela) Lazarus (1–3) (Italy) Daiko Team Lazarus (4–11)	26	7	3	20	12	17	15	Ret	17	Ret	21	14	11	7	7	17	17	14	19	11	Ret	10	C	31
10	(Venezuela) Lazarus (1–3) (Italy) Daiko Team Lazarus (4–11)	27	16	18	17	13	22	Ret	DNP	DNP	15	24	DNP	DNP	12	9	11	6	Ret	17	12	17	12	C	31
11	(Netherlands) MP Motorsport	16	14	Ret	13	15	3	4			10	7	15	14	NC	Ret	Ret	WD	18	14	14	11	Ret	C	29
11	(Netherlands) MP Motorsport	17	18	13	15	9	12	12	21	12	11	26†	10	Ret	Ret	DNS	10	8	16	Ret	20	Ret	14	C	29
12	(United Kingdom) Arden International	20	9	8	23†	21	21	17	16	21	20	15	20	21	16	14	14	18	15	11	17	20	9	C	25
12	(United Kingdom) Arden International	21	Ret	16	8	7	18	Ret	20	13	18	23	11	6	Ret	20	6	Ret	12	9	24	10	Ret	C	25
13	(Germany) Hilmer Motorsport	24			Ret	14	10	9	8	Ret	7	5	Ret	17	Ret	17	16	16							19
13	(Germany) Hilmer Motorsport	25			21	Ret	20	Ret	22	18	16	17	Ret	16											19
Pos.	Team	No.	BHR1 (Bahrain)		CAT (Spain)		MON (Monaco)		RBR (Austria)		SIL (United Kingdom)		HUN (Hungary)		SPA (Belgium)		MNZ (Italy)		SOC (Russia)		BHR2 (Bahrain)		YMC (United Arab Emirates)		Points

Colour	Result
Gold	Winner
Silver	Second place
Bronze	Third place
Green	Points classification
Blue	Non-points classification
Blue	Non-classified finish (NC)
Purple	Retired, not classified (Ret)
Red	Did not qualify (DNQ)
Red	Did not pre-qualify (DNPQ)
Black	Disqualified (DSQ)
White	Did not start (DNS)
White	Withdrew (WD)
White	Race cancelled (C)
Blank	Did not practice (DNP)
Blank	Did not arrive (DNA)
Blank	Excluded (EX)

**Bold** – Pole
Italics – Fastest Lap

Notes:

- † — Drivers did not finish the race, but were classified as they completed over 90% of the race distance.
