= 2009 Formula BMW Europe season =

Racing championship season

Seasons
- ← 2008 2010 →

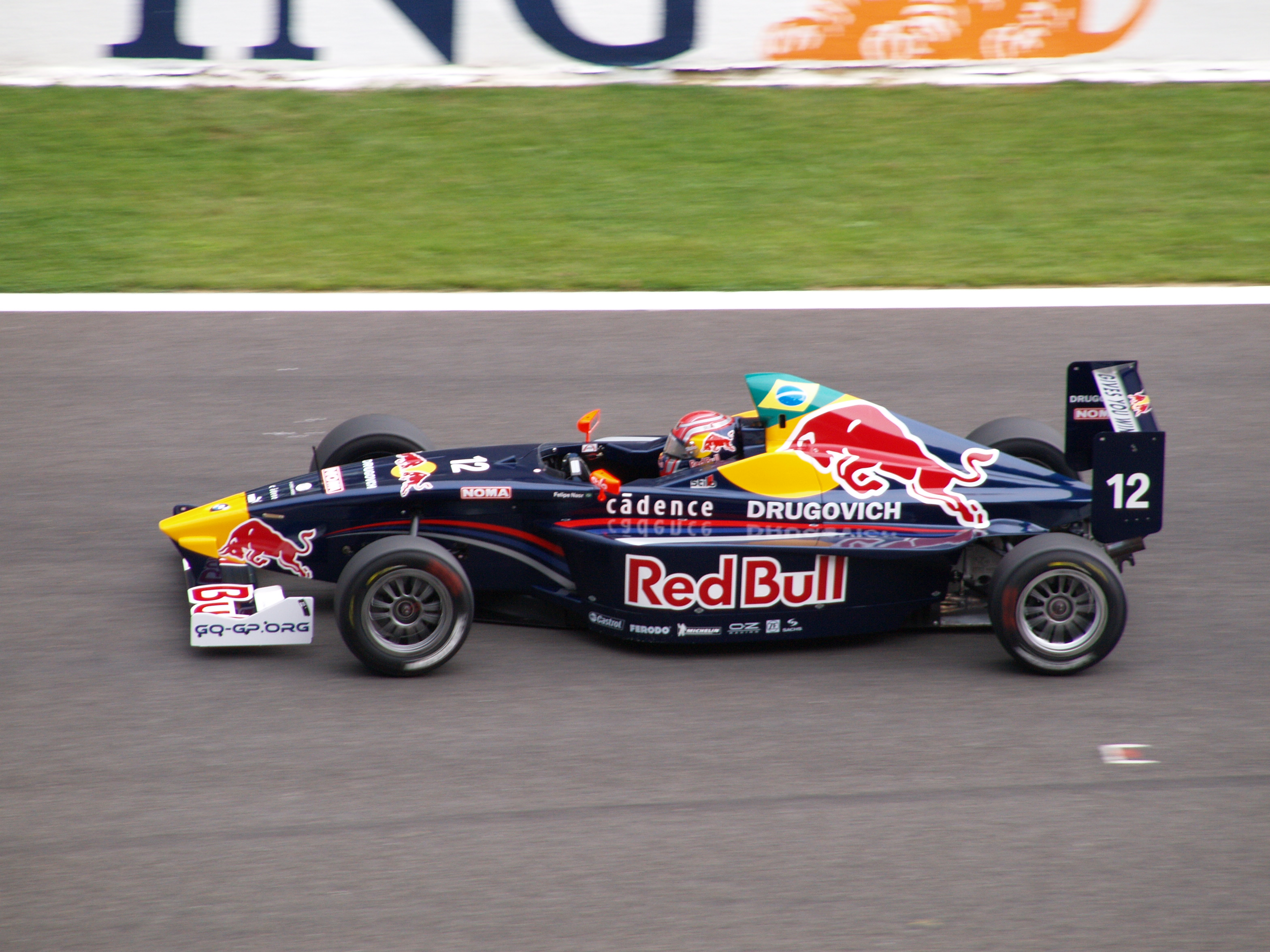
Felipe Nasr, the 2009 Drivers' Champion.

The 2009 Formula BMW Europe season was the second season of Formula BMW Europe championship. The championship was contested over sixteen races at eight meetings: seven of which supported Formula One Grands Prix and a meeting at the Masters of Formula 3 event at Zandvoort. Felipe Nasr won the title at Monza, having finished fourteen of the sixteen races in the top two and won the title by 104 points. Two months after the season's finish, all results were confirmed after Mücke Motorsport's appeal over a breach of technical regulations was rejected by the FIA.

== Teams and drivers ==
- All cars are powered by BMW engines, and Mygale FB02 chassis. Guest drivers in italics.

| Team | No | Driver | Class | Rounds |
|---|---|---|---|---|
| (Germany) Josef Kaufmann Racing | 2 | (United Kingdom) Kazeem Manzur | | All |
| (Germany) Josef Kaufmann Racing | 3 | (Spain) Facundo Regalia (Note: Regalia is an Argentine driver who raced this year under Spanish racing license.) | | All |
| (Germany) Josef Kaufmann Racing | 4 | (Netherlands) Robin Frijns | R | All |
| (Germany) Eifelland Racing | 5 | (Malaysia) Jazeman Jaafar | | All |
| (Germany) Eifelland Racing | 6 | (Greece) Giorgios Katsinis | R | All |
| (Germany) Eifelland Racing | 7 | (Germany) David Mengesdorf | | 1–5 |
| (Germany) Eifelland Racing | 7 | (Romania) Doru Sechelariu | | 7–8 |
| (United Kingdom) Fortec Motorsport | 8 | (United Kingdom) William Buller | | All |
| (United Kingdom) Fortec Motorsport | 9 | (United Kingdom) Jack Harvey | R | All |
| (United Kingdom) Fortec Motorsport | 10 | (Spain) Antonio Martínez | R | All |
| (United States) EuroInternational | 11 | (Spain) Daniel Juncadella | | All |
| (United States) EuroInternational | 12 | (Brazil) Felipe Nasr | | All |
| (United States) EuroInternational | 14 | (France) Olivier Lombard | | All |
| (Germany) Mücke Motorsport | 15 | (Denmark) Michael Christensen | | All |
| (Germany) Mücke Motorsport | 16 | (Sweden) Timmy Hansen | R | All |
| (Germany) Mücke Motorsport | 17 | (Netherlands) Jack Te Braak | R | All |
| (France) DAMS | 18 | (France) Jim Pla | | All |
| (France) DAMS | 19 | (Spain) Javier Tarancón | | All |
| (France) DAMS | 20 | (France) Côme Ledogar | | All |
| (United Kingdom) Räikkönen Robertson Racing | 21 | (United Kingdom) Rupert Svendsen-Cook | | All |
| (United Kingdom) Räikkönen Robertson Racing | 22 | (Republic of Ireland) Gary Thompson | R | 3, 5 |
| (United Kingdom) Räikkönen Robertson Racing | 22 | (United Kingdom) Ollie Millroy | | 7–8 |
| (United Kingdom) Räikkönen Robertson Racing | 23 | (France) Grégoire Demoustier | | 1–7 |
| (Italy) FMS International (Italy) Scuderia Coloni | 24 | (Romania) Doru Sechelariu | | 1–5 |
| (Italy) FMS International (Italy) Scuderia Coloni | 24 | (Austria) Kevin Friesacher | | 8 |
| (Italy) FMS International (Italy) Scuderia Coloni | 25 | (Italy) Kevin Gilardoni | | 1–5 |
| (Italy) FMS International (Italy) Scuderia Coloni | 26 | (Spain) Ramón Piñeiro | | 1–5 |
| (Italy) FMS International (Italy) Scuderia Coloni | 26 | (Indonesia) Rio Haryanto | | 8 |
| (United Kingdom) Motaworld Racing | 27 | (United Kingdom) Ollie Millroy | | 1–3 |
| (United Kingdom) Motaworld Racing | 27 | (Spain) Ramón Piñeiro | | 6–8 |
| (United Kingdom) Motaworld Racing | 28 | (Denmark) Mikkel Mac | R | 1–5 |
| (United Kingdom) Motaworld Racing | 28 | (Romania) Doru Sechelariu | | 6 |
| (United Kingdom) Motaworld Racing | 28 | (Malaysia) Fahmi Ilyas | | 8 |
| (United Kingdom) Motaworld Racing | 29 | (China) Huan Zhu | | 1 |
| (United Kingdom) Motaworld Racing | 29 | (United Kingdom) Matt Bell | | 5 |
| (United Kingdom) Motaworld Racing | 29 | (Malaysia) Fahmi Ilyas | | 6 |
| (United Kingdom) Motaworld Racing | 29 | (United Arab Emirates) Asad Rahman | | 7 |
| (United Kingdom) Motaworld Racing | 29 | (Australia) Steel Guiliana | | 8 |
| (Switzerland) Daltec Racing | 30 | (Switzerland) Christof von Grünigen | | 8 |
| (Switzerland) Daltec Racing | 31 | (Italy) Kevin Giovesi | | 8 |
| (Switzerland) Daltec Racing | 32 | (Switzerland) Sven Ackermann | | 8 |

| Icon | Class |
|---|---|
| R | Rookie Cup |

- Mücke Motorsport were given a four-race ban due to a force-deflection test that revealed that each oil pressure relief valve spring was of a different characteristic than the standard spring installed in the engine. They raced at Valencia and Spa under appeal, an appeal they would later lose.
- † Drivers registered in other International Formula BMW series during 2009 are limited to an entry for three meetings of their choice, these Drivers will compete as Guest Drivers, they will not be entitled to receive points and prize money in the Driver classification and/or the Rookie Cup classification and/or the Team Trophy classification.

== Calendar ==
=== Season schedule ===
| Round | | Circuit | Date | Pole position | Fastest lap | Winning driver | Winning team |
|---|---|---|---|---|---|---|---|
| 1 | R1 | (Spain) Circuit de Catalunya | 9 May | (Brazil) Felipe Nasr | (Brazil) Felipe Nasr | (Denmark) Michael Christensen | (Germany) Mücke Motorsport |
| 1 | R2 | (Spain) Circuit de Catalunya | 10 May | (Brazil) Felipe Nasr | (Brazil) Felipe Nasr | (Brazil) Felipe Nasr | (United States) EuroInternational |
| 2 | R1 | (Netherlands) Circuit Park Zandvoort | 14 June | (Netherlands) Robin Frijns | (Denmark) Michael Christensen | (Brazil) Felipe Nasr | (United States) EuroInternational |
| 2 | R2 | (Netherlands) Circuit Park Zandvoort | 14 June | (United Kingdom) Jack Harvey | (Brazil) Felipe Nasr | (United Kingdom) Jack Harvey | (United Kingdom) Fortec Motorsport |
| 3 | R1 | (United Kingdom) Silverstone Circuit | 20 June | (United Kingdom) William Buller | (Brazil) Felipe Nasr | (Netherlands) Robin Frijns | (Germany) Josef Kaufmann Racing |
| 3 | R2 | (United Kingdom) Silverstone Circuit | 21 June | (Denmark) Michael Christensen | (Denmark) Michael Christensen | (Denmark) Michael Christensen | (Germany) Mücke Motorsport |
| 4 | R1 | (Germany) Nürburgring | 11 July | (Brazil) Felipe Nasr | (Denmark) Michael Christensen | (Denmark) Michael Christensen | (Germany) Mücke Motorsport |
| 4 | R2 | (Germany) Nürburgring | 12 July | (Brazil) Felipe Nasr | (Brazil) Felipe Nasr | (Brazil) Felipe Nasr | (United States) EuroInternational |
| 5 | R1 | (Hungary) Hungaroring | 25 July | (Denmark) Michael Christensen | (Denmark) Michael Christensen | (Denmark) Michael Christensen | (Germany) Mücke Motorsport |
| 5 | R2 | (Hungary) Hungaroring | 26 July | (Denmark) Michael Christensen | (Brazil) Felipe Nasr | (Brazil) Felipe Nasr | (United States) EuroInternational |
| 6 | R1 | (Spain) Valencia Street Circuit | 22 August | (France) Jim Pla | (France) Jim Pla | (France) Jim Pla | (France) DAMS |
| 6 | R2 | (Spain) Valencia Street Circuit | 23 August | (France) Jim Pla | (France) Jim Pla | (France) Jim Pla | (France) DAMS |
| 7 | R1 | (Belgium) Circuit de Spa-Francorchamps | 29 August | (Brazil) Felipe Nasr | (Malaysia) Jazeman Jaafar | (France) Jim Pla | (France) DAMS |
| 7 | R2 | (Belgium) Circuit de Spa-Francorchamps | 30 August | (Brazil) Felipe Nasr | (Netherlands) Robin Frijns | (France) Jim Pla | (France) DAMS |
| 8 | R1 | (Italy) Autodromo Nazionale Monza | 12 September | (United Kingdom) Jack Harvey | (Malaysia) Jazeman Jaafar | (Spain) Daniel Juncadella | (United States) EuroInternational |
| 8 | R2 | (Italy) Autodromo Nazionale Monza | 13 September | (France) Jim Pla | (United Kingdom) Jack Harvey | (Brazil) Felipe Nasr | (United States) EuroInternational |

== Standings ==
=== Drivers ===
- Points are awarded as follows:

| 1 | 2 | 3 | 4 | 5 | 6 | 7 | 8 | 9 | 10 | 11 | 12 | 13 | 14 | 15 | PP |
|---|---|---|---|---|---|---|---|---|---|---|---|---|---|---|---|
| 30 | 24 | 20 | 18 | 16 | 14 | 12 | 10 | 8 | 6 | 5 | 4 | 3 | 2 | 1 | **1** |

| Pos | Driver | CAT (Spain) | | ZAN (Netherlands) | | SIL (United Kingdom) | | NÜR (Germany) | | HUN (Hungary) | | VSC (Spain) | | SPA (Belgium) | | MNZ (Italy) | | Pts |
|---|---|---|---|---|---|---|---|---|---|---|---|---|---|---|---|---|---|---|
| 1 | (Brazil) Felipe Nasr | **2** | **1** | 1 | 2 | 8 | 8 | **2** | **1** | 2 | 1 | 2 | 2 | **2** | **2** | 2 | 1 | 392 |
| 2 | (Spain) Daniel Juncadella | 5 | 3 | 3 | 3 | 7 | 7 | 7 | 4 | 5 | 3 | 5 | 4 | 6 | 3 | 1 | 2 | 288 |
| 3 | (Netherlands) Robin Frijns | 4 | 4 | **2** | 4 | 1 | 10 | 3 | 5 | 4 | 7 | 3 | 14 | 3 | 5 | 3 | 12 | 265 |
| 4 | (Denmark) Michael Christensen | 1 | 2 | 8 | 5 | 4 | **1** | 1 | 2 | **1** | **DSQ** | DSQ | DSQ | DSQ | DSQ | Ret | 4 | 233 |
| 5 | (France) Jim Pla | 11 | 8 | 11 | 8 | Ret | 13 | 10 | 12 | 3 | 2 | **1** | **1** | 1 | 1 | 7 | **Ret** | 222 |
| 6 | (United Kingdom) Rupert Svendsen-Cook | 15 | 15 | 10 | 17 | 3 | 3 | 18 | 6 | 6 | 4 | 10 | 5 | 4 | 4 | 13 | 8 | 165 |
| 7 | (United Kingdom) Jack Harvey | 7 | 19 | 5 | **1** | 5 | 9 | 17 | Ret | 14 | 6 | 7 | 9 | 11 | 10 | **5** | 16 | 149 |
| 8 | (Spain) Facundo Regalia | 13 | 10 | 4 | 18† | 10 | 4 | 4 | 8 | 7 | 17 | 6 | 6 | 7 | 7 | 11 | Ret | 148 |
| 9 | (Malaysia) Jazeman Jaafar | 3 | 7 | 7 | Ret | Ret | 15 | 8 | 9 | 15 | 15 | Ret | 3 | 8 | 8 | 12 | 6 | 123 |
| 10 | (United Kingdom) William Buller | 12 | 18 | 13 | Ret | **6** | 5 | 23 | 3 | Ret | 8 | 9 | 7 | 10 | 11 | 6 | Ret | 113 |
| 11 | (United Kingdom) Kazeem Manzur | 8 | Ret | 6 | 16 | 2 | 2 | 9 | Ret | 13 | 11 | 14† | 10 | Ret | 15 | 15 | 10 | 107 |
| 12 | (Spain) Javier Tarancón | 20 | 5 | 19 | 7 | 23 | 16 | 11 | 15 | 10 | 9 | 4 | Ret | 12 | 13 | 4 | 21 | 91 |
| 13 | (Sweden) Timmy Hansen | Ret | 9 | 23 | 10 | 20 | 6 | 5 | 11 | 9 | DSQ | DSQ | DSQ | DSQ | DSQ | 8 | 7 | 79 |
| 14 | (Romania) Doru Sechelariu | 9 | 17 | 16 | 9 | 12 | 14 | Ret | 13 | 12 | 10 | 12 | 15† | 9 | Ret | Ret | 3 | 69 |
| 15 | (Germany) David Mengesdorf | 6 | 6 | 9 | Ret | 9 | 22 | 6 | 10 | 11 | Ret | | | | | | | 69 |
| 16 | (France) Olivier Lombard | Ret | 22 | 15 | 6 | 13 | Ret | 13 | 7 | 16 | 16 | Ret | 8 | DSQ | 9 | 16 | 5 | 67 |
| 17 | (France) Côme Ledogar | Ret | 12 | 18 | 14 | 21 | 11 | 14 | 14 | 21 | 5 | Ret | Ret | 5 | Ret | 14 | 19 | 50 |
| 18 | (United Kingdom) Ollie Millroy | 10 | 14 | Ret | 20† | 11 | Ret | | | | | | | Ret | 6 | 10 | 11 | 39 |
| 19 | (Spain) Ramón Piñeiro | 14 | 11 | 12 | 11 | 15 | Ret | 21 | DSQ | 17 | 12 | 8 | Ret | 13 | 12 | Ret | Ret | 38 |
| 20 | (Netherlands) Jack Te Braak | 18 | 13 | 14 | Ret | Ret | 12 | 12 | 17 | 8 | DSQ | DSQ | DSQ | DSQ | DSQ | 9 | 15 | 34 |
| 21 | (Greece) Giorgios Katsinis | 17 | Ret | 17 | Ret | 14 | Ret | 16 | 18 | 18 | 13 | 11 | 12 | 14 | 14 | 18 | 14 | 23 |
| 22 | (France) Grégoire Demoustier | 19 | DNS | 24 | 13 | 16 | 21 | 22 | Ret | 20 | 20 | Ret | 13 | 16 | 18 | | | 7 |
| 23 | (Denmark) Mikkel Mac | 22 | 21 | 21 | 12 | 22 | 18 | 20 | 19 | Ret | 19 | | | | | | | 4 |
| 24 | (Italy) Kevin Gilardoni | 16 | 16 | 20 | 15 | 19 | 17 | 15 | 16 | Ret | 14 | | | | | | | 4 |
| 25 | (United Arab Emirates) Asad Rahman | | | | | | | | | | | | | 15 | 17 | | | 1 |
| 26 | (Spain) Antonio Martínez | 21 | Ret | 22 | 19† | 17 | 20 | 19 | Ret | 22 | Ret | Ret | Ret | Ret | 16 | 20 | 20 | 0 |
| 27 | (United Kingdom) Matt Bell | | | | | | | | | 19 | 21 | | | | | | | 0 |
guest drivers ineligible for points
| | (Austria) Kevin Friesacher | | | | | | | | | | | | | | | 17 | 9 | 0 |
| | (Malaysia) Fahmi Ilyas | | | | | | | | | | | 13 | 11 | | | Ret | 22 | 0 |
| | (Switzerland) Christof von Grünigen | | | | | | | | | | | | | | | 19 | 13 | 0 |
| | (Indonesia) Rio Haryanto | | | | | | | | | | | | | | | Ret | 17 | 0 |
| | (Republic of Ireland) Gary Thompson | | | | | 18 | 19 | | | 23 | 18 | | | | | | | 0 |
| | (Switzerland) Sven Ackermann | | | | | | | | | | | | | | | 21 | 18 | 0 |
| | (China) Huan Zhu | Ret | 20 | | | | | | | | | | | | | | | 0 |
| | (Australia) Steel Guiliana | | | | | | | | | | | | | | | Ret | DNS | 0 |
| | (Italy) Kevin Giovesi | | | | | | | | | | | | | | | DNS | DNS | 0 |
| Pos | Driver | CAT (Spain) | | ZAN (Netherlands) | | SIL (United Kingdom) | | NÜR (Germany) | | HUN (Hungary) | | VSC (Spain) | | SPA (Belgium) | | MNZ (Italy) | | Pts |

| Colour | Result |
|---|---|
| Gold | Winner |
| Silver | Second place |
| Bronze | Third place |
| Green | Points classification |
| Blue | Non-points classification |
| Blue | Non-classified finish (NC) |
| Purple | Retired, not classified (Ret) |
| Red | Did not qualify (DNQ) |
| Red | Did not pre-qualify (DNPQ) |
| Black | Disqualified (DSQ) |
| White | Did not start (DNS) |
| White | Withdrew (WD) |
| White | Race cancelled (C) |
| Blank | Did not practice (DNP) |
| Blank | Did not arrive (DNA) |
| Blank | Excluded (EX) |

**Bold** – Pole
Italics – Fastest Lap
**R** – Rookie Cup

† — Drivers did not finish the race, but were classified as they completed over 90% of the race distance.

=== Teams ===
- Points are awarded to all eligible cars from each team as follows:

| 1 | 2 | 3 | 4 | 5 | 6 | 7 | 8 | 9 | 10 | 11 | 12 |
|---|---|---|---|---|---|---|---|---|---|---|---|
| 36 | 33 | 30 | 27 | 24 | 21 | 18 | 15 | 12 | 9 | 6 | 3 |

- Then the total number of points scored by each Team will be divided by the number of cars from that team that entered the meeting.

| Pos | Team | No | CAT (Spain) | | ZAN (Netherlands) | | SIL (United Kingdom) | | NÜR (Germany) | | HUN (Hungary) | | VSC (Spain) | | SPA (Belgium) | | MNZ (Italy) | | Pts |
|---|---|---|---|---|---|---|---|---|---|---|---|---|---|---|---|---|---|---|---|
| 1 | (United States) EuroInternational | 11 | 5 | 3 | 3 | 3 | 7 | 7 | 7 | 4 | 5 | 3 | 5 | 4 | 6 | 3 | 1 | 2 | 339 |
| 1 | (United States) EuroInternational | 12 | 2 | 1 | 1 | 2 | 8 | 8 | 2 | 1 | 2 | 1 | 2 | 2 | 2 | 2 | 2 | 1 | 339 |
| 1 | (United States) EuroInternational | 14 | Ret | 22 | 15 | 6 | 13 | Ret | 13 | 7 | 16 | 16 | Ret | 8 | DSQ | 9 | 16 | 5 | 339 |
| 2 | (Germany) Josef Kaufmann Racing | 2 | 8 | Ret | 6 | 16 | 2 | 2 | 9 | Ret | 13 | 11 | 14† | 10 | Ret | 15 | 15 | 10 | 245 |
| 2 | (Germany) Josef Kaufmann Racing | 3 | 13 | 10 | 4 | 18† | 10 | 4 | 4 | 8 | 7 | 17 | 6 | 6 | 7 | 7 | 11 | Ret | 245 |
| 2 | (Germany) Josef Kaufmann Racing | 4 | 4 | 4 | 2 | 4 | 1 | 10 | 3 | 5 | 4 | 7 | 3 | 14 | 3 | 5 | 3 | 12 | 245 |
| 3 | (Germany) Mücke Motorsport | 15 | 1 | 2 | 8 | 5 | 4 | 1 | 1 | 2 | 1 | DSQ | DSQ | DSQ | DSQ | DSQ | Ret | 4 | 151 |
| 3 | (Germany) Mücke Motorsport | 16 | Ret | 9 | 23 | 10 | 20 | 6 | 5 | 11 | 9 | DSQ | DSQ | DSQ | DSQ | DSQ | 8 | 7 | 151 |
| 3 | (Germany) Mücke Motorsport | 17 | 18 | 13 | 14 | Ret | Ret | 12 | 12 | 17 | 8 | DSQ | DSQ | DSQ | DSQ | DSQ | 9 | 15 | 151 |
| 4 | (France) DAMS | 18 | 11 | 8 | 11 | 8 | Ret | 13 | 10 | 12 | 3 | 2 | 1 | 1 | 1 | 1 | 7 | Ret | 138 |
| 4 | (France) DAMS | 19 | 20 | 5 | 19 | 7 | 23 | 16 | 11 | 15 | 10 | 9 | 4 | Ret | 12 | 13 | 4 | 21 | 138 |
| 4 | (France) DAMS | 20 | Ret | 12 | 18 | 14 | 21 | 11 | 14 | 14 | 21 | 5 | Ret | Ret | 5 | Ret | 14 | 19 | 138 |
| 5 | (United Kingdom) Fortec Motorsport | 8 | 12 | 18 | 13 | Ret | 6 | 5 | 23 | 3 | Ret | 8 | 9 | 7 | 10 | 11 | 6 | Ret | 121 |
| 5 | (United Kingdom) Fortec Motorsport | 9 | 7 | 19 | 5 | 1 | 5 | 9 | 17 | Ret | 14 | 6 | 7 | 9 | 11 | 10 | 5 | 16 | 121 |
| 5 | (United Kingdom) Fortec Motorsport | 10 | 21 | Ret | 22 | 19† | 17 | 20 | 19 | Ret | 22 | Ret | Ret | Ret | Ret | 16 | 20 | 20 | 121 |
| 6 | (Germany) Eifelland Racing | 5 | 3 | 7 | 7 | Ret | Ret | 15 | 8 | 9 | 15 | 15 | Ret | 3 | 8 | 8 | 12 | 6 | 112 |
| 6 | (Germany) Eifelland Racing | 6 | 17 | Ret | 17 | Ret | 14 | Ret | 16 | 18 | 18 | 13 | 11 | 12 | 14 | 14 | 18 | 14 | 112 |
| 6 | (Germany) Eifelland Racing | 7 | 6 | 6 | 9 | Ret | 9 | 22 | 6 | 10 | 11 | Ret | | | 9 | Ret | Ret | 3 | 112 |
| 7 | (United Kingdom) Räikkönen Robertson Racing | 21 | 15 | 15 | 10 | 17 | 3 | 3 | 18 | 6 | 6 | 4 | 10 | 5 | 4 | 4 | 13 | 8 | 95.5 |
| 7 | (United Kingdom) Räikkönen Robertson Racing | 22 | | | | | 18 | 19 | | | 23 | 18 | | | Ret | 6 | 10 | 11 | 95.5 |
| 7 | (United Kingdom) Räikkönen Robertson Racing | 23 | 19 | DNS | 24 | 13 | 16 | 21 | 22 | Ret | 20 | 20 | Ret | 13 | 16 | 18 | | | 95.5 |
| 8 | (Italy) FMS International (Italy) Scuderia Coloni | 24 | 9 | 17 | 16 | 9 | 12 | 14 | Ret | 13 | 12 | 10 | | | | | 17 | 9 | 19 |
| 8 | (Italy) FMS International (Italy) Scuderia Coloni | 25 | 16 | 16 | 20 | 15 | 19 | 17 | 15 | 16 | Ret | 14 | | | | | | | 19 |
| 8 | (Italy) FMS International (Italy) Scuderia Coloni | 26 | 14 | 11 | 12 | 11 | 15 | Ret | 21 | DSQ | 17 | 12 | | | | | Ret | 17 | 19 |
| 9 | (United Kingdom) Motaworld Racing | 27 | 10 | 14 | Ret | 20† | 11 | Ret | | | | | 8 | Ret | 13 | 12 | Ret | Ret | 16 |
| 9 | (United Kingdom) Motaworld Racing | 28 | 22 | 21 | 21 | 12 | 22 | 18 | 20 | 19 | Ret | 19 | 12 | 15† | | | Ret | 22 | 16 |
| 9 | (United Kingdom) Motaworld Racing | 29 | Ret | 20 | | | | | | | 19 | 21 | 13 | 11 | 15 | 17 | Ret | DNS | 16 |
guest teams ineligible for points
| | (Switzerland) Daltec Racing | 30 | | | | | | | | | | | | | | | 19 | 13 | 0 |
| | (Switzerland) Daltec Racing | 31 | | | | | | | | | | | | | | | DNS | DNS | 0 |
| | (Switzerland) Daltec Racing | 32 | | | | | | | | | | | | | | | 21 | 18 | 0 |
| Pos | Team | No | CAT (Spain) | | ZAN (Netherlands) | | SIL (United Kingdom) | | NÜR (Germany) | | HUN (Hungary) | | VSC (Spain) | | SPA (Belgium) | | MNZ (Italy) | | Pts |
