= 2008 Formula BMW Europe season =

Seasons
- ← none 2009 →

The 2008 Formula BMW Europe season was the first season of a new open wheel racing series that resulted by the merging of the Formula BMW Germany and Formula BMW UK championships. Formula BMW Europe is a continental series for junior drivers, whose mission is to develop talented young drivers and introduce them to auto racing.

The season started on April 27, 2008 at the Circuit de Catalunya in Barcelona and ended on September 14 at Monza. All rounds were staged on the undercard of the Formula One World Championship except Zolder, which was a support race of the Masters of Formula 3.

After sixteen rounds, Mexican Esteban Gutiérrez became the first Formula BMW Europe champion.

== Teams and drivers ==
All cars are powered by BMW engines, and Mygale FB02 chassis. Guest drivers in italics.

Team	No	Driver	Class	Rounds
(United Kingdom) Double R Racing	2	(Colombia) Carlos Huertas		All
(United Kingdom) Double R Racing	3	(Denmark) Michael Christensen	R	All
(United Kingdom) Double R Racing	4	(United Kingdom) Rupert Svendsen-Cook		All
(Germany) Josef Kaufmann Racing	5	(Germany) Marco Wittmann		All
(Germany) Josef Kaufmann Racing	6	(United Kingdom) Kazeem Manzur	R	All
(Germany) Josef Kaufmann Racing	7	(Mexico) Esteban Gutiérrez		All
(United Kingdom) Motaworld Racing	8	(United Kingdom) Thomas Hilldson	R	All
(United Kingdom) Motaworld Racing	9	(Netherlands) Mathijs Harkema		All
(United Kingdom) Motaworld Racing	10	(United Arab Emirates) Asad Rahman	R	All
(United States) EuroInternational	11	(Spain) Daniel Juncadella		All
(United States) EuroInternational	12	(Spain) Facundo Regalia (Note: Regalia is an Argentine driver who raced this year under Spanish racing license.)	R	All
(United States) EuroInternational	14	(Brazil) Giancarlo Vilarinho	R	1, 3, 8
(United States) EuroInternational	14	(Brazil) Ricardo Favoretto		2
(United States) EuroInternational	14	(United States) Alexander Rossi		4
(United States) EuroInternational	14	(Philippines) Marlon Stöckinger		5–7
(United Kingdom) Fortec Motorsport	15	(Romania) Doru Sechelariu		All
(United Kingdom) Fortec Motorsport	16	(United Kingdom) William Buller		All
(United Kingdom) Fortec Motorsport	17	(Spain) Ramón Piñeiro	R	All
(Italy) FMS International	18	(Brazil) Pedro Bianchini		All
(Italy) FMS International	19	(Romania) Mihai Marinescu		All
(Italy) FMS International	20	(United Kingdom) Ollie Millroy	R	All
(Germany) Mücke Motorsport	21	(Ecuador) Juan Cevallos		1–5
(Germany) Mücke Motorsport	22	(Germany) David Mengesdorf	R	All
(Germany) Mücke Motorsport	23	(France) Anthony Comas		1–2
(Germany) Mücke Motorsport	23	(Serbia) Velibor Jovanovic	R	3
(Germany) Mücke Motorsport	23	(Austria) Philipp Eng		4–5, 7
(Germany) Mücke Motorsport	23	(Bahrain) Sami Favre		6
(Germany) AM-Holzer Rennsport	24	(Germany) Bastian Graber		1–3, 5–6
(Germany) AM-Holzer Rennsport	25	(Malaysia) Jazeman Jaafar		All
(Germany) AM-Holzer Rennsport	26	(Malaysia) Melvin Moh		1
(Germany) AM-Holzer Rennsport	26	(South Africa) Kyle Mitchell		5, 6
(Germany) Eifelland Racing	27	(France) Adrien Tambay		All
(Germany) Eifelland Racing	28	(Brazil) Tiago Geronimi		All
(Germany) Eifelland Racing	29	(Brazil) Henrique Martins	R	All
(France) DAMS	30	(France) Kévin Breysse		All
(France) DAMS	31	(France) Jim Pla		All
(France) DAMS	32	(United Kingdom) Jordan Williams		1, 3
(France) DAMS	32	(Switzerland) Joel Volluz		4, 8
(France) DAMS	32	(South Africa) Simon Moss		7

Icon	Class
R	Rookie Cup

== Calendar ==
Round		Circuit	Date	Pole position	Fastest lap	Winning driver	Winning team	Report
1	R1	(Spain) Circuit de Catalunya	26 April	(France) Adrien Tambay	(Germany) David Mengesdorf	(France) Adrien Tambay	(Germany) Eifelland Racing	Report
1	R2	(Spain) Circuit de Catalunya	27 April	(France) Adrien Tambay	(Germany) Marco Wittmann	(France) Adrien Tambay	(Germany) Eifelland Racing	Report
2	R1	(Belgium) Circuit Zolder	31 May	(Spain) Daniel Juncadella	(Mexico) Esteban Gutiérrez	(Mexico) Esteban Gutiérrez	(Germany) Josef Kaufmann Racing	Report
2	R2	(Belgium) Circuit Zolder	1 June	(Spain) Daniel Juncadella	(Denmark) Michael Christensen	(Mexico) Esteban Gutiérrez	(Germany) Josef Kaufmann Racing	Report
3	R1	(United Kingdom) Silverstone Circuit	5 July	(Spain) Ramón Piñeiro	(Mexico) Esteban Gutiérrez	(Mexico) Esteban Gutiérrez	(Germany) Josef Kaufmann Racing	Report
3	R2	(United Kingdom) Silverstone Circuit	6 July	(Spain) Ramón Piñeiro	(Mexico) Esteban Gutiérrez	(Mexico) Esteban Gutiérrez	(Germany) Josef Kaufmann Racing	Report
4	R1	(Germany) Hockenheimring	19 July	(Mexico) Esteban Gutiérrez	(Mexico) Esteban Gutiérrez	(Mexico) Esteban Gutiérrez	(Germany) Josef Kaufmann Racing	Report
4	R2	(Germany) Hockenheimring	20 July	(Mexico) Esteban Gutiérrez	(Mexico) Esteban Gutiérrez	(Mexico) Esteban Gutiérrez	(Germany) Josef Kaufmann Racing	Report
5	R1	(Hungary) Hungaroring	3 August	(Spain) Daniel Juncadella	(Spain) Daniel Juncadella	(Spain) Daniel Juncadella	(United States) EuroInternational	Report
5	R2	(Hungary) Hungaroring	4 August	(Spain) Daniel Juncadella	(Mexico) Esteban Gutiérrez	(Spain) Daniel Juncadella	(United States) EuroInternational	Report
6	R1	(Spain) Valencia Street Circuit	23 August	(France) Kévin Breysse	(Mexico) Esteban Gutiérrez	(Brazil) Tiago Geronimi	(Germany) Eifelland Racing	Report
6	R2	(Spain) Valencia Street Circuit	24 August	(Mexico) Esteban Gutiérrez	(Mexico) Esteban Gutiérrez	(Mexico) Esteban Gutiérrez	(Germany) Josef Kaufmann Racing	Report
7	R1	(Belgium) Circuit de Spa-Francorchamps	6 September	(Germany) Marco Wittmann	(Spain) Ramón Piñeiro	(Germany) Marco Wittmann	(Germany) Eifelland Racing	Report
7	R2	(Belgium) Circuit de Spa-Francorchamps	7 September	(Brazil) Tiago Geronimi	(France) Kévin Breysse	(France) Kévin Breysse	(France) DAMS	Report
8	R1	(Italy) Autodromo Nazionale Monza	13 September	(Colombia) Carlos Huertas	(Brazil) Giancarlo Vilarinho	(Brazil) Tiago Geronimi	(Germany) Eifelland Racing	Report
8	R2	(Italy) Autodromo Nazionale Monza	14 September	(Colombia) Carlos Huertas	(United Kingdom) William Buller	(Brazil) Tiago Geronimi	(Germany) Eifelland Racing	Report

== Results ==
=== Drivers ===
- Points are awarded as follows:

1	2	3	4	5	6	7	8	9	10	11	12	13	14	15	PP
30	24	20	18	16	14	12	10	8	6	5	4	3	2	1	**1**

Pos	Driver	CAT (Spain)		ZOL (Belgium)		SIL (United Kingdom)		HOC (Germany)		HUN (Hungary)		VSC (Spain)		SPA (Belgium)		MNZ (Italy)		Pts
1	(Mexico) Esteban Gutiérrez	3	2	1	1	1	1	**1**	**1**	Ret	2	2	**1**	17	8	4	3	353
2	(Germany) Marco Wittmann	4	5	3	2	5	5	3	3	2	3	3	2	**1**	6	3	2	327
3	(France) Adrien Tambay	**1**	**1**	8	3	3	3	2	2	Ret	4	Ret	4	3	2	18	Ret	260
4	(Spain) Daniel Juncadella	2	3	**2**	**6**	8	7	6	4	**1**	**1**	Ret	5	10	7	Ret	17	237
5	(Brazil) Tiago Geronimi	11	Ret	13	15	27	27†	25	19	6	6	1	6	2	**3**	1	**1**	187
6	(Denmark) Michael Christensen	Ret	6	DNS	20	2	8	7	26	5	5	9	8	7	10	6	6	158
7	(Brazil) Pedro Bianchini	6	11	12	7	4	2	8	6	16	16	4	17	5	19	9	Ret	145
8	(France) Kévin Breysse	10	4	9	13	23	Ret	14	5	3	9	**21**†	3	13	1	Ret	Ret	136
9	(Colombia) Carlos Huertas	9	7	6	5	6	16	19	18	12	11	20	13	15	5	**2**	5	136
10	(Germany) David Mengesdorf	DSQ	8	5	4	15	6	12	21	7	7	7	11	6	18	13	Ret	124
11	(Romania) Mihai Marinescu	7	10	7	10	7	4	5	8	Ret	Ret	Ret	14	11	13	7	16	118
12	(United Kingdom) William Buller	8	16	10	9	Ret	21	17	11	4	8	8	9	25†	Ret	11	10	87
13	(United Kingdom) Rupert Svendsen-Cook	17	12	11	8	9	9	13	14	14	19	13	16	12	11	5	9	81
14	(Malaysia) Jazeman Jaafar	5	24	16	19	17	12	4	7	8	10	Ret	26	20	16	15	Ret	67
15	(Romania) Doru Sechelariu	12	23	4	11	11	15	26	20	11	12	Ret	20	24†	9	16	7	64
16	(Spain) Facundo Regalia	Ret	DNS	21	21	12	24	15	13	9	20	6	7	16	15	8	15	60
17	(France) Jim Pla	15	Ret	17	16	19	17	21	17	18	24	19	18	9	4	10	4	54
18	(United Kingdom) Kazeem Manzur	13	13	24	23	10	11	9	27†	15	14	Ret	10	14	Ret	Ret	8	47
19	(Brazil) Henrique Martins	14	15	15	14	13	19	11	15	19	13	5	25	23	Ret	17	Ret	38
20	(Spain) Ramón Piñeiro	25	9	22	12	**21**	**18**	24†	24	10	17	17	Ret	8	Ret	Ret	14	37
21	(United Kingdom) Ollie Millroy	16	Ret	18	17	24	10	Ret	9	Ret	22	11	15	19	Ret	Ret	DNS	20
22	(Netherlands) Mathijs Harkema	21	21	Ret	Ret	16	13	10	Ret	Ret	DNS	12	12	Ret	Ret	14	Ret	20
23	(United Kingdom) Thomas Hillsdon	19	19	Ret	24	18	14	16	16	17	15	10	22	18	14	Ret	12	19
24	(United Kingdom) Jordan Williams	23	14			14	23											4
25	(Ecuador) Juan Cevallos	22	Ret	26	26	22	Ret	20	22	13	26							3
26	(Germany) Bastian Graber	18	20	20	22	26	22			23†	DNS	14	21					2
27	(France) Anthony Comas	Ret	17	19	25													0
28	(United Arab Emirates) Asad Rahman	24	25	25	27	25	25	23	25	22	25	18	27	Ret	21	19	Ret	0
29	(South Africa) Kyle Mitchell									20	21	Ret	19					0
guest drivers ineligible for points
	(Austria) Philipp Eng							18	12	Ret	18			4	12			0
	(United States) Alexander Rossi							22	10									0
	(Switzerland) Joel Volluz							Ret	23							Ret	11	0
	(Brazil) Giancarlo Vilarinho	20	18			20	20									12	13	0
	(Brazil) Ricardo Favoretto			14	18													0
	(Philippines) Marlon Stöckinger									21	23	15	23	20	21			0
	(Bahrain) Sami Favre											16	24					0
	(South Africa) Simon Moss													22	17			0
	(Malaysia) Melvin Moh	Ret	22															0
	(Serbia) Velibor Jovanovic					Ret	26											0
Pos	Driver	CAT (Spain)		ZOL (Belgium)		SIL (United Kingdom)		HOC (Germany)		HUN (Hungary)		VSC (Spain)		SPA (Belgium)		MNZ (Italy)		Pts

Colour	Result
Gold	Winner
Silver	Second place
Bronze	Third place
Green	Points classification
Blue	Non-points classification
Blue	Non-classified finish (NC)
Purple	Retired, not classified (Ret)
Red	Did not qualify (DNQ)
Red	Did not pre-qualify (DNPQ)
Black	Disqualified (DSQ)
White	Did not start (DNS)
White	Withdrew (WD)
White	Race cancelled (C)
Blank	Did not practice (DNP)
Blank	Did not arrive (DNA)
Blank	Excluded (EX)

**Bold** – Pole
Italics – Fastest Lap
**R** – Rookie Cup

† — Drivers did not finish the race, but were classified as they completed over 90% of the race distance.

== Teams ==
Pos	Team	Pts
1	(Germany) Josef Kaufmann Racing	723
2	(Germany) Eifelland Racing	481
3	(United Kingdom) Double R Racing	374
4	(United States) EuroInternational	293
5	(Italy) FMS International	283
6	(France) DAMS	193
7	(United Kingdom) Fortec Motorsport	186
8	(Germany) Mücke Motorsport	127
9	(Germany) AM-Holzer Rennsport	69
10	(United Kingdom) Motaworld Racing	39
