= Facu Regalia =

Argentine racing driver

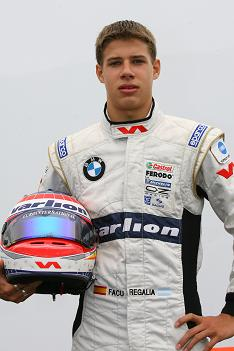
- Nationality: (Argentina) Argentine
- Born: Facundo Regalia; 23 November 1991 (age 34) Tigre, Argentina

GP2 Series career
- Debut season: 2014
- Current team: Hilmer Motorsport
- Car number: 12
- Starts: 8
- Championships: 0
- Wins: 0
- Poles: 0
- Fastest laps: 0
- Best finish: 31st in 2014

Previous series
- 2012–13 2012 2012 2011 2008–10 2009: GP3 Series; Auto GP World Series; European F3 Open; Italian Formula Three; Formula BMW Europe; Formula BMW Pacific

Facundo "Facu" Regalia (born 23 November 1991 in Tigre) is an Argentine former racing driver. He competed in his first two Formula BMW seasons under a Spanish racing licence.

== Career ==
=== Karting ===
Regalia began karting in 2006 and raced primarily in Spain for the majority of his career.

=== Formula BMW ===
Regalia began his formula racing career in 2008 in the newly created Formula BMW Europe with EuroInternational. He finished sixteenth overall in the championship, with nine point-scoring finishes and 60 points.

Regalia remained in the series for the following season but switched to Josef Kaufmann Racing. He improved to eighth in standings, taking thirteen points-scoring positions in sixteen races. In 2010, Regalia completed his third season, joining Eifelland Racing. He finished eighth in the championship for the second successive season, achieving his first podium at Zandvoort.

=== Formula Three ===
2011 saw Regalia move to the Italian Formula Three Championship, competing for Arco Motorsport. He finished tenth in the championship with two podiums at Imola and Vallelunga. Also in 2011, he joined Mücke Motorsport to compete in Formula 3 Euro Series in the finale at Hockenheim. He had two finishes on the tenth position and retired in the last race of the week-end.

In 2012, Regalia switched to the European F3 Open Championship, joining Campos Racing.

=== Auto GP World Series ===
As well as his European F3 Open commitments, Regalia also participated in the Auto GP World Series with Campos Racing.

=== GP3 Series ===
Regalia made his GP3 Series debut, in the fourth round of the 2012 season at Silverstone. He replaced Jakub Klášterka at Jenzer Motorsport. In 2013, Regalia competed with ART Grand Prix with whom he finished runner-up to Daniil Kvyat.

=== GP2 Series ===
In 2014, Regalia graduated to GP2 with Hilmer Motorsport. After just four rounds where he failed to score a point, Regalia left the team and the series.

=== Formula 3.5 ===
Regalia signed with Zeta Course for the 2015 season. However, the team withdrew from the sport due to lack of funding. Regalia attempted to enter the sport with Comtec Racing, but terminated his contract after three days with the team, leaving him without a drive.

== Racing record ==
=== Career summary ===
Season	Series	Team	Races	Wins	Poles	F/Laps	Podiums	Points	Position
2008	Formula BMW Europe	EuroInternational	15	0	0	0	0	60	16th
2008	Formula BMW World Final	Josef Kaufmann Racing	1	0	0	0	0	N/A	10th
2009	Formula BMW Europe	Josef Kaufmann Racing	16	0	0	0	0	148	8th
2009	Formula BMW Pacific	EuroInternational	3	2	2	2	2	N/A	NC†
2010	Formula BMW Europe	Eifelland Racing	16	0	0	0	1	148	8th
2011	Italian Formula 3 Championship	Arco Motorsport	14	0	1	2	2	55	10th
2011	Formula 3 Euro Series	Mücke Motorsport	3	0	0	0	0	N/A	NC†
2012	Auto GP World Series	Campos Racing	10	0	0	0	2	68	7th
2012	European F3 Open Championship	Campos Racing	16	3	3	2	6	186	4th
2012	GP3 Series	Jenzer Motorsport	2	0	0	0	0	0	25th
2012	GP3 Series	Atech CRS Grand Prix	2	0	0	0	0	0	25th
2013	GP3 Series	ART Grand Prix	16	1	1	2	6	138	**2nd**
2014	GP2 Series	Hilmer Motorsport	8	0	0	0	0	0	31st
2015	Auto GP	FMS Racing	4	1	1	2	3	68	**2nd‡**
2015	FIA European Formula 3 Championship	EuroInternational	0	0	0	0	0	0	NC
2015	24H Series – 997	MSG Motorsport							
2016	24H Series – 991	MSG Motorsport							
2020	Formula Regional European Championship	Van Amersfoort Racing	3	0	0	0	0	N/A	NC†

^{†} As Regalia was a guest driver, he was ineligible to score points.
^{‡} Position when the season was cancelled.

=== Complete Formula BMW Europe results ===
(key) (Races in bold indicate pole position; races in italics indicate fastest lap)

Year	Entrant	1	2	3	4	5	6	7	8	9	10	11	12	13	14	15	16	Pos	Points
2008	EuroInternational	CAT; 1 Ret	CAT; 2 DNS	ZOL; 1; 21	ZOL; 2; 21	SIL; 1; 12	SIL; 2; 24	HOC; 1; 15	HOC; 2; 13	HUN; 1; 9	HUN; 2; 20	VSC; 1; 6	VSC; 2; 7	SPA; 1; 16	SPA; 2; 15	MNZ; 1; 8	MNZ; 2; 15	16th	60
2009	Josef Kaufmann Racing	CAT; 1; 13	CAT; 2; 10	ZAN; 1; 4	ZAN; 2; 18†	SIL; 1; 10	SIL; 2; 4	NÜR; 1; 4	NÜR; 2; 8	HUN; 1; 7	HUN; 2; 17	VSC; 1; 6	VSC; 2; 6	SPA; 1; 7	SPA; 2; 7	MNZ; 1; 11	MNZ; 2 Ret	8th	148
2010	Eifelland Racing	CAT; 1; 7	CAT; 2; 4	ZAN; 1; 2	ZAN; 2; 7	VSC; 1; 6	VSC; 2; 5	SIL; 1; 5	SIL; 2; 4	HOC; 1 Ret	HOC; 2; 9	HUN; 1; 9	HUN; 2; 9	SPA; 1 Ret	SPA; 2; 12	MNZ; 1 Ret	MNZ; 2; 7	8th	172

=== Complete Formula BMW Pacific results ===
(key) (Races in bold indicate pole position; races in italics indicate fastest lap)

Year	Entrant	1	2	3	4	5	6	7	8	9	10	11	12	13	14	15	Pos	Points
2009	EuroInternational	SEP1; 1	SEP1; 2	SEP2; 1	SEP2; 2	SEP2; 3	SEP2; 4	SEN; 1	SEN; 2	SEN; 3	SEN; 4	SIN; 1	SIN; 2	**OKA**; **1**; 1	**OKA**; **2**; 1	MAC; Ret	NC	0

=== Complete Italian Formula Three Championship results ===
(key) (Races in bold indicate pole position; races in italics indicate fastest lap)

Year	Entrant	Chassis	Engine	1	2	3	4	5	6	7	8	9	10	11	12	13	14	15	16	Pos	Points
2011	Arco Motorsport	Dallara F308	FPT	FRA; 1 Ret	FRA; 2; 14	MIS; 1; 6	MIS; 2; 4	IMO; 1; 3	IMO; 2 Ret	SPA; 1; 6	SPA; 2; 7	ADR; 1; 8	ADR; 2 Ret	VLL; 1; 11	VLL; 2; 2	**MUG**; **1** Ret	MUG; 2; 8	MZA; 1 DNS	MZA; 2 DNS	10th	55

=== Complete Formula 3 Euro Series results ===
(key) (Races in bold indicate pole position; races in italics indicate fastest lap)

Year	Entrant	Chassis	Engine	1	2	3	4	5	6	7	8	9	10	11	12	13	14	15	16	17	18	19	20	21	22	23	24	25	26	27	Pos	Points
2011	Mücke Motorsport	Dallara F308	Mercedes	LEC; 1	LEC; 2	LEC; 3	HOC; 1	HOC; 2	HOC; 3	ZAN; 1	ZAN; 2	ZAN; 3	RBR; 1	RBR; 2	RBR; 3	NOR; 1	NOR; 2	NOR; 3	NÜR; 1	NÜR; 2	NÜR; 3	SIL; 1	SIL; 2	SIL; 3	VAL; 1	VAL; 2	VAL; 3	HOC; 1; 10	HOC; 2; 10	HOC; 3 Ret	NC	0

=== Complete European F3 Open Championship results ===
(key) (Races in bold indicate pole position; races in italics indicate fastest lap)

Year	Entrant	1	2	3	4	5	6	7	8	9	10	11	12	13	14	15	16	Pos	Points
2012	Campos Racing	ALG; 1; 6	ALG; 2; 4	NÜR; 1; 5	NÜR; 2; 3	SPA; 1; 8	SPA; 2; 14	BRH; 1; 11	**BRH**; **2**; 2	LEC; 1; 3	LEC; 2; 5	HUN; 1 Ret	**HUN**; **2**; 1	MNZ; 1; 4	MNZ; 2; 9	CAT; 1; 1	**CAT**; **2**; 1	4th	186

=== Complete Auto GP World Series results ===
(key) (Races in bold indicate pole position; races in italics indicate fastest lap)

Year	Entrant	1	2	3	4	5	6	7	8	9	10	11	12	13	14	Pos	Points
2012	Campos Racing	MNZ; 1; 4	MNZ; 2; 9	VAL; 1; 7	VAL; 2; 2	MAR; 1 Ret	MAR; 2; 10	HUN; 1; 3	HUN; 2; 10	ALG; 1; 6	ALG; 2; 5	CUR; 1	CUR; 2	SON; 1	SON; 2	7th	68
2015	FMS Racing	HUN; 1; 1	HUN; 2; 6	**SIL**; **1**; 2	SIL; 2; 2											2nd‡	68‡

^{‡} Position when season was cancelled.

=== Complete GP3 Series results ===
(key) (Races in bold indicate pole position) (Races in italics indicate fastest lap)

Year	Entrant	1	2	3	4	5	6	7	8	9	10	11	12	13	14	15	16	D.C.	Points
2012	Jenzer Motorsport	CAT; FEA	CAT; SPR	MON; FEA	MON; SPR	VAL; FEA	VAL; SPR	SIL; FEA; 14	SIL; SPR; 12	HOC; FEA	HOC; SPR							27th	0
2012	Atech CRS Grand Prix											HUN; FEA; 18	HUN; SPR; 18	SPA; FEA	SPA; SPR	MNZ; FEA	MNZ; SPR	27th	0
2013	ART Grand Prix	CAT; FEA; 24†	CAT; SPR; 14	VAL; FEA; 2	VAL; SPR; 7	SIL; FEA; 3	SIL; SPR; 5	**NÜR**; **FEA**; 1	NÜR; SPR; Ret	HUN; FEA; 6	HUN; SPR; 4	SPA; FEA; 3	SPA; SPR; 3	MNZ; FEA; 3	MNZ; SPR; 4	YMC; FEA; 15	YMC; SPR; 16	**2nd**	**138**

=== Complete GP2 Series results ===
(key) (Races in bold indicate pole position) (Races in italics indicate fastest lap)

Year	Entrant	1	2	3	4	5	6	7	8	9	10	11	12	13	14	15	16	17	18	19	20	21	22	DC	Points
2014	Hilmer Motorsport	BHR; FEA; Ret	BHR; SPR; 20	CAT; FEA; Ret	CAT; SPR; 17	MON; FEA; Ret	MON; SPR; 21	RBR; FEA; Ret	RBR; SPR; 24	SIL; FEA	SIL; SPR	HOC; FEA	HOC; SPR	HUN; FEA	HUN; SPR	SPA; FEA	SPA; SPR	MNZ; FEA	MNZ; SPR	SOC; FEA	SOC; SPR	YMC; FEA	YMC; SPR	31st	0

=== Complete Formula Regional European Championship results ===
(key) (Races in bold indicate pole position) (Races in italics indicate fastest lap)

Year	Entrant	1	2	3	4	5	6	7	8	9	10	11	12	13	14	15	16	17	18	19	20	21	22	23	24	DC	Points
2020	Van Amersfoort Racing	MIS; 1	MIS; 2	MIS; 3	LEC; 1; 7	LEC; 2; 7	LEC; 3; 8	RBR; 1	RBR; 2	RBR; 3	MUG; 1	MUG; 2	MUG; 3	MNZ; 1	MNZ; 2	MNZ; 3	CAT; 1	CAT; 2	CAT; 3	IMO; 1	IMO; 2	IMO; 3	VLL; 1	VLL; 2	VLL; 3	NC	–
