= Ollie Millroy =

British racing driver (born 1990)

- Millroy in 2025
- Nationality: (United Kingdom) British
- Born: Oliver Stephen Millroy; 21 April 1990 (age 36) Windsor, Berkshire, England
- Categorisation: FIA Silver

Championship titles
- 2022 2022 2021 2014: GT World Challenge Europe Endurance Cup – Gold; Asian Le Mans Series – GT; International GT Open – Pro-Am; Option Cup – Super Lite

Oliver Stephen Millroy (born 21 April 1990) is a British racing driver and stunt driver who last competed in the IMSA SportsCar Championship for Inception Racing and the China GT Championship for FIST Team AAI.

A regular co-driver of Brendan Iribe at Inception Racing, Millroy has driven McLaren and Ferrari sportscars in IMSA and the 24 Hours of Le Mans since 2021. He is also a champion in International GT Open, Asian Le Mans Series and the GT World Challenge Europe Endurance Cup.

== Career ==
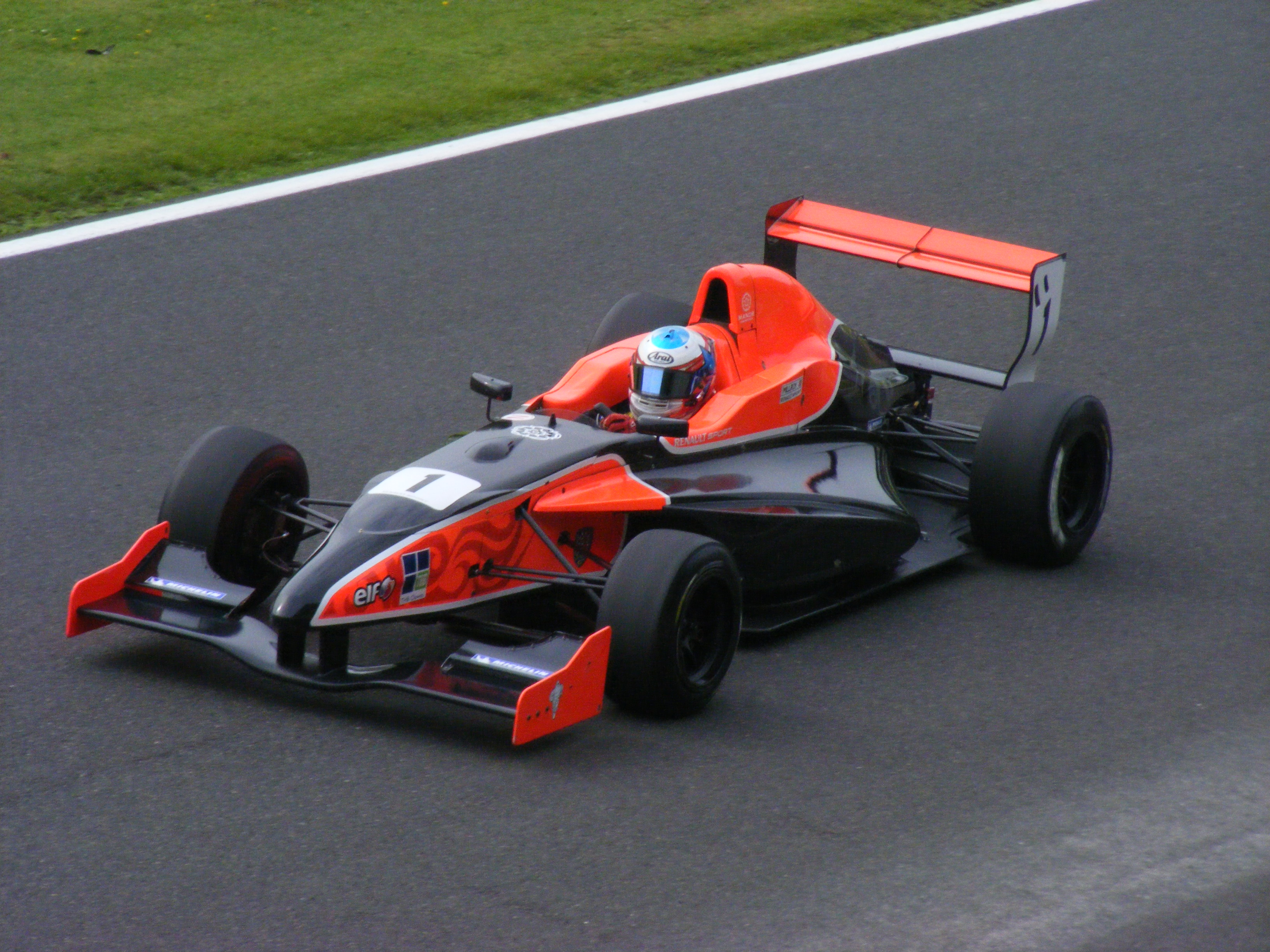
Millroy driving for Manor at Oulton Park in Formula Renault 2.0 UK in 2010.

Millroy made his single-seater debut in 2008, competing in Formula BMW Europe for FMS International, finishing 21st overall with a best result of ninth at the Hockenheimring. Millroy also raced in the Americas and Pacific counterparts, in which he scored a lone win at Shanghai in the latter for Motaworld Racing, as well as finishing sixth in the end-of-year Formula BMW World Final for them. A part-time campaign in Formula BMW Europe followed in 2009, before spending two seasons in the Formula Renault 2.0 UK Championship, in which he most notably finished sixth in 2010 with a win at Snetterton for Manor Competition.

In 2012, Millroy moved to sportscars, joining BMW-fielding Ecurie Ecosse to compete in the Pro-Am class of the Blancpain Endurance Series. After scoring a lone point with them, Millroy continued with the team to compete in the following year's European Le Mans Series in the GTC class. He won the season-opening 3 Hours of Silverstone and took two other podiums to end the year third in points. Moving to Asia for 2014, Millroy contested most of the Asian Le Mans Series for fellow BMW customer team AAI-Rstrada, finishing on the podium in all three races he started to take fourth in the GT standings. Continuing with the team for the 2015–16 season, Millroy took three podiums and once again finished fourth in the GT standings. Continuing with the team for the next two seasons, Millroy most notably took a win at Fuji in the 2017–18 season en route to runner-up honours in the GT class.

Millroy began his GT3 spell at Inception Racing in 2020.

After spending most of 2019 on the sidelines, Millroy won the end-of-year Gulf 12 Hours for McLaren-fielding Balfe Motorsport in the GT4 class. Returning to GT3 for 2020, Millroy began a long association with Optimum Motorsport and Brendan Iribe as he contested the International GT Open in a McLaren 720S GT3. Millroy and Iribe took seven Pro-Am podiums to end the year fifth in class. The pair began 2021 by taking two podiums in the Asian Le Mans Series to take fourth in the GT standings, partnering Ben Barnicoat under the Inception Racing banner. Returning to International GT Open for the rest of the year, Millroy and Iribe took three class wins as they secured the Pro-Am title at the finale in Barcelona. During 2021, Millroy also took a lone Pro-Am win in GT World Challenge America, as well as making appearances in the GT World Challenge Europe Endurance Cup and the 24 Hours of Le Mans, the latter in a Ferrari 488 GTE Evo.

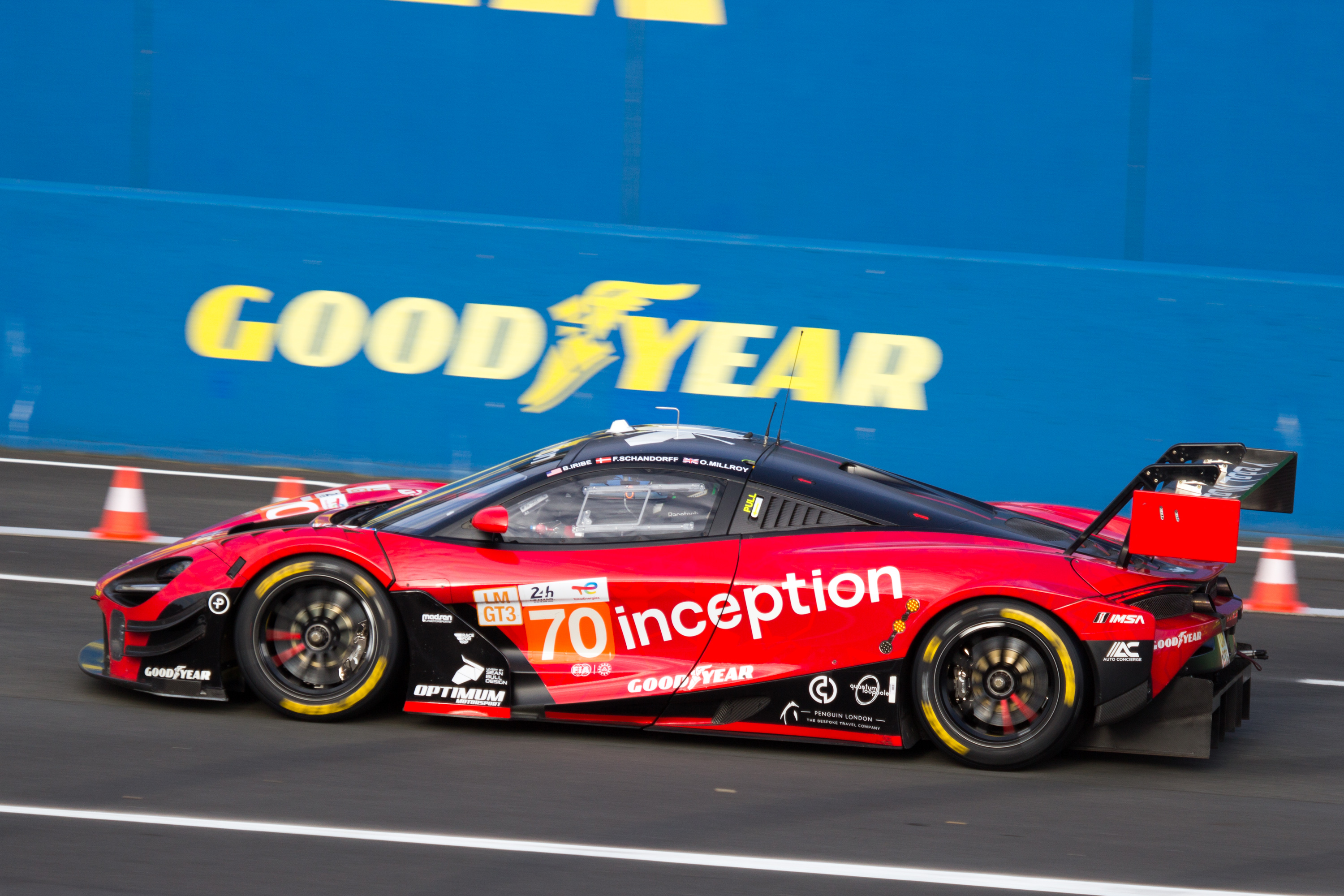
Millroy's Inception Racing McLaren at the 2024 24 Hours of Le Mans.

In 2022, Millroy continued with Inception Racing with Optimum Motorsport for a part-time campaign in the GTD class of the IMSA SportsCar Championship, in which he finished second at the Six Hours of The Glen with Iribe and Jordan Pepper. He found more success elsewhere, as he sealed the GT title in the Asian Le Mans Series with Iribe and Barnicoat, as well as the Gold Cup title of the GT World Challenge Europe Endurance Cup with Iribe and Frederik Schandorff. In parallel, Millroy also raced in the first five races of the FIA World Endurance Championship for Porsche-fielding Team Project 1, in which he finished third in LMGTE Am at the 1000 Miles of Sebring. In 2023, Millroy continued with Inception to race in the enduros of the IMSA SportsCar Championship, in which he finished third at the 24 Hours of Daytona. Millroy also entered the 24 Hours of Spa and the Gulf 12 Hours, winning the latter in GT3 Pro-Am. Across the following two seasons, Millroy assisted Inception Racing's transition to the Ferrari 296 GT3 in IMSA, most notably taking an outright GTD win at Indianapolis in 2025 with Iribe and Schandorff. During this time period, Millroy also returned to the 24 Hours of Le Mans in 2024, where Iribe set LMGT3 pole, and raced at the 24 Hours of Spa for Optimum in both years.

In 2026, Millroy remained with Inception for another part-time campaign in the IMSA SportsCar Championship, as well as returning to Team AAI to race in the China GT Championship. On 5 September 2026, at the penultimate round of China GT at Shanghai, Millroy was involved in a crash with two cars at the turn 14 hairpin, causing his Ferrari to burst into flames. He was rescued from the wreckage by rival Loek Hartog, whom he later credited for saving his life. Millroy was taken to hospital, where it was revealed he had suffered five broken ribs, a broken collarbone, hand and finger, and a bruised lung.

== Other ventures ==
In addition to his motorsport career, Millroy works within the film and television industry as a stunt performer and precision driver. Millroy's credits as a stunt driver include Mission: Impossible – Rogue Nation (2015), Transformers: The Last Knight (2017), Men in Black: International (2019), and Mission: Impossible – Dead Reckoning Part One (2023). He also featured in racing video game adaptation Gran Turismo (2023) and Apple Original Films production F1 (2025), starring Brad Pitt. Beyond feature films, Millroy is regularly contracted for television commercials and promotional campaigns by automotive manufacturers, including McLaren, Mercedes-Benz, and Ferrari.

Millroy is also a driver coach, primarily for co-driver Brendan Iribe, as well as the co-founder and director of travel agencies Penguin London and Penguin Middle East.

== Karting record ==
=== Karting career summary ===
Season	Series	Team	Position
2002	Super One Series — Comer Cadet		12th
2003	Super One Series — TKM Junior		3rd
2004	Super One Series — ICA Junior		11th
2004	Andrea Margutti Trophy — ICA Junior		16th
2004	Karting European Championship — ICA Junior	Intrepid Kart Technology	5th
2004	Italian Open Masters — ICA Junior		
2004	Torneo Delle Industrie — 100 Junior		8th
2005	South Garda Winter Cup — 100 Junior		17th
2005	Super One Series — ICA Junior		4th
2005	British Championship — ICA Junior		4th
2005	Karting European Championship — ICA Junior	Ricky Flynn Motorsport	26th
2005	Torneo Delle Industrie — ICA		15th
2006	South Garda Winter Cup — ICA		1st
2006	Andrea Margutti Trophy — ICA		8th
2006	Super One Series — ICA		1st
2006	Asia-Pacific Championship — ICA		8th
2006	Italian Open Masters — ICA		19th
2006	Karting European Championship — ICA		29th
2006	Karting World Championship — ICA		15th
2006	Torneo Delle Industrie — Formula A		15th
2006	Kartmasters British GP — Super Libre		7th
2007	South Garda Winter Cup — KF1		12th
2007	Andrea Margutti Trophy — KF1		7th
2007	WSK International Series — KF1		
2007	Italian Open Masters — KF1		11th
2007	Championnat de France — KF1		12th
2007	Karting European Championship — KF1		31st
2007	Karting World Championship — KF1		10th

== Racing record ==
=== Racing career summary ===
Season	Series	Team	Races	Wins	Poles	F/Laps	Podiums	Points	Position
2008	Formula BMW Europe	FMS International	15	0	0	0	0	20	21st
2008	Formula BMW Americas	Atlantic Motorsport	4	0	0	0	0	0	NC†
2008	Formula BMW Pacific	Motaworld Racing	5	1	0	0	2	0	NC†
2008	Formula BMW World Final	Motaworld Racing	1	0	0	0	0	—N/a	6th
2009	Formula BMW Europe	Motaworld Racing	6	0	0	0	0	39	18th
2009	Formula BMW Europe	Räikkönen Robertson Racing	4	0	0	0	0	39	18th
2010	Formula Renault 2.0 UK Championship	Fortec Motorsport	5	0	0	0	0	336	6th
2010	Formula Renault 2.0 UK Championship	Manor Competition	14	1	1	2	4	336	6th
2010	Formula Renault UK Winter Series	Manor Competition	6	0	0	1	1	97	6th
2011	Formula Renault 2.0 UK Championship	Manor Competition	8	0	0	1	0	152	12th
2012	Blancpain Endurance Series – Pro-Am	Ecurie Ecosse	5	0	0	0	0	1	38th
2012	JK Racing Asia Series	Mahara	0	0	0	0	0	0	NC
2012	British GT Championship – GT3	Ecurie Ecosse	2	0	0	0	0	16	24th
2013	European Le Mans Series – GTC	Ecurie Ecosse	5	1	0	0	3	67	**3rd**
2014	Asian Le Mans Series – GT	AAI-Rstrada	3	0	0	0	3	52	4th
2014	Malaysian Super Series – GT Open								
2014	Option Cup – Super Lite								**1st**
2014	Porsche Carrera Cup Great Britain	Redline Racing	2	0	0	0	0	0	NC†
2015–16	Asian Le Mans Series – GT	Team AAI	4	0	0	0	3	51	4th
2016	Asian Le Mans Sprint Cup – LMP3	Team AAI							
2016–17	Asian Le Mans Series – GT	FIST-Team AAI	4	0	0	0	1	31	8th
2017	Blancpain GT Series Asia – GT3 Silver	FIST - Team AAI	2	0	0	0	1	22	16th
2017–18	Asian Le Mans Series – GT	FIST-Team AAI	4	1	2	0	4	78	**2nd**
2019	Gulf 12 Hours – GT4	Balfe Motorsport	1	1	0	0	1	—N/a	**1st**
2020	International GT Open – Pro-Am	Optimum Motorsport	12	0	0	1	7	49	5th
2020	Le Mans Cup – GT3	Optimum Motorsport	1	0	0	0	0	0	NC†
2020	British GT Championship – GT3	Optimum Motorsport	1	0	0	0	0	0	NC†
2021	24H GT Series – GT3 Am	Inception Racing with Optimum Motorsport	1	0	0	0	0	18	NC
2021	Asian Le Mans Series – GT	Inception Racing with Optimum Motorsport	4	0	0	0	2	45	4th
2021	International GT Open – Pro-Am	Inception Racing	14	3	3	1	12	88	**1st**
2021	GT World Challenge Europe Endurance Cup – Pro-Am	Inception Racing with Optimum Motorsport	3	0	1	0	0	7	32nd
2021	British GT Championship – GT3	Inception Racing with Optimum Motorsport	1	0	0	0	0	0	NC†
2021	GT World Challenge America – Pro-Am	Inception Racing with Optimum Motorsport	5	1	1	1	2	66	13th
2021	24 Hours of Le Mans – LMGTE Am	Inception Racing	1	0	0	0	0	—N/a	12th
2021	Gulf 12 Hours – GT3 Pro-Am	Inception Racing with Optimum Motorsport	1	0	0	0	0	—N/a	DNF
2022	IMSA SportsCar Championship – GTD	Inception Racing with Optimum Motorsport	3	0	0	0	1	884	27th
2022	Asian Le Mans Series – GT	Inception Racing with Optimum Motorsport	4	1	0	0	3	72	**1st**
2022	GT World Challenge Europe Endurance Cup – Gold	Inception Racing with Optimum Motorsport	5	2	0	0	2	90	**1st**
2022	FIA World Endurance Championship – LMGTE Am	Team Project 1	5	0	0	0	1	28	16th
2022	24 Hours of Le Mans – LMGTE Am	Team Project 1	1	0	0	0	0	—N/a	DNF
2022	Gulf 12 Hours – GT3 Pro-Am	Inception Racing with Optimum Motorsport	1	0	0	0	0	—N/a	10th
2023	IMSA SportsCar Championship – GTD	Inception Racing	3	0	0	0	1	956	31st
2023	Asian Le Mans Series – GT	HubAuto Racing	4	0	0	0	0	12	12th
2023	GT World Challenge Europe Endurance Cup – Bronze	Inception Racing	1	0	0	0	0	0	NC
2023	Gulf 12 Hours – GT3 Pro-Am	Optimum Motorsport	1	1	0	0	1	—N/a	**1st**
2023–24	Asian Le Mans Series – GT	Optimum Motorsport	5	0	0	0	2	38	6th
2024	IMSA SportsCar Championship – GTD	Inception Racing	5	0	0	0	0	1086	33rd
2024	GT World Challenge Europe Endurance Cup – Bronze	Optimum Motorsport	2	0	0	0	0	13	26th
2024	24 Hours of Le Mans – LMGT3	Inception Racing	1	0	0	0	0	—N/a	13th
2025	IMSA SportsCar Championship – GTD	Inception Racing	5	1	0	0	2	1285	22nd
2025	GT World Challenge Europe Endurance Cup – Gold	Optimum Motorsport	1	0	0	0	0	9	16th
2025	Gulf 12 Hours – Pro	Inception Racing	1	0	0	0	0	—N/a	DNF
2026	IMSA SportsCar Championship – GTD	Inception Racing	4	0	0	0	0	739	45th
2026	China GT Championship – GT3	FIST Team AAI	4	0	0	0	0	6*	29th*
2027	IMSA SportsCar Championship – GTD	Inception Racing							

^{†} As Millroy was a guest driver, he was ineligible to score points.

=== Complete Formula BMW Europe results ===
(key) (Races in bold indicate pole position; results in italics indicate fastest lap)

Year	Entrant	1	2	3	4	5	6	7	8	9	10	11	12	13	14	15	16	DC	Points
2008	FMS International	CAT; 1; 16	CAT; 2 Ret	ZOL; 1; 18	ZOL; 2; 17	SIL; 1; 24	SIL; 2; 10	HOC; 1 Ret	HOC; 2; 9	HUN; 1 Ret	HUN; 2; 22	VSC; 1; 11	VSC; 2; 15	SPA; 1; 19	SPA; 2 Ret	MNZ; 1 Ret	MNZ; 2 DNS	21st	20
2009	Motaworld Racing	CAT; 1; 10	CAT; 2; 14	ZAN; 1 Ret	ZAN; 2; 20†	SIL; 1; 11	SIL; 2 Ret	NÜR; 1	NÜR; 2	HUN; 1	HUN; 2	VSC; 1	VSC; 2					18th	39
2009	Räikkönen Robertson Racing													SPA; 1 Ret	SPA; 2; 6	MNZ; 1; 10	MNZ; 2; 11	18th	39

=== Complete Formula Renault 2.0 UK results ===
(key) (Races in bold indicate pole position; results in italics indicate fastest lap)

Year	Entrant	1	2	3	4	5	6	7	8	9	10	11	12	13	14	15	16	17	18	19	20	21	DC	Points
2010	Fortec Motorsport	THR; 1; 7	THR; 2 Ret	ROC; 1; 4	ROC; 2; 5	BHGP; 1 C	BHGP; 2; 11																6th	336
2010	Manor Competition							OUL; 1; 5	OUL; 2; 10	CRO; 1; 2	CRO; 2; 12	**SNE**; **1**; 1	SNE; 2; 5	SIL1; 1; 5	SIL1; 2 Ret	SIL1; 3; 3	KNO; 1 Ret	KNO; 2; 3	SIL2; 1; 4	SIL2; 2; 7	BRI; 1; 6	BRI; 2; 6	6th	336
2011	Manor Competition	BHI; 1; 4	BHI; 2; 4	DON; 1; 5	DON; 2; 6	THR; 1; 4	THR; 2; 5	OUL; 1; 11	OUL; 2; 8	CRO; 1	CRO; 2	SNE; 1	SNE; 2	SIL; 1	SIL; 2	ROC; 1	ROC; 2	BHI; 1	BHI; 2	SIL; 1	SIL; 2		12th	152

=== Complete GT World Challenge Europe results ===
==== GT World Challenge Europe Endurance Cup ====
(key) (Races in bold indicate pole position; results in italics indicate fastest lap)

Year	Team	Car	Class	1	2	3	4	5	6	7	8	Pos.	Points
2012	Ecurie Ecosse	BMW Z4 GT3	Pro-Am	MNZ; 21	SIL; 34	LEC; 20	SPA; 6H	SPA; 12H	SPA; 24H	NÜR; 20	NAV; 21	38th	1
2021	Inception Racing with Optimum Motorsport	McLaren 720S GT3	Pro-Am	MNZ; Ret	LEC; 34	SPA; 6H; 53	SPA; 12H; 42	SPA; 24H; 28	NÜR	CAT		32nd	7
2022	Inception Racing with Optimum Motorsport	McLaren 720S GT3	Gold	IMO; 38	**LEC**; 9	SPA; 6H; 38	SPA; 12H; 38	SPA; 24H; 27	HOC; 15	CAT; 35		1st	90
2023	Inception Racing	McLaren 720S GT3 Evo	Bronze	MNZ	LEC	SPA; 6H; Ret	SPA; 12H; Ret	SPA; 24H; Ret	NÜR	CAT		NC	0
2024	Optimum Motorsport	McLaren 720S GT3 Evo	Bronze	LEC; Ret	SPA; 6H; 25	SPA; 12H; 37	SPA; 24H; 21	NÜR	MNZ	JED		26th	13
2025	Optimum Motorsport	McLaren 720S GT3 Evo	Gold	LEC	MNZ	SPA; 6H; 43	SPA; 12H; 39	SPA; 24H; 39	NÜR	BAR		16th	9

=== Complete European Le Mans Series results ===
(key) (Races in bold indicate pole position; results in italics indicate fastest lap)

Year	Entrant	Class	Chassis	Engine	1	2	3	4	5	Rank	Points
2013	Ecurie Ecosse	GTC	BMW Z4 GT3	BMW P65B44 4.4 L V8	SIL; 1	IMO; 3	RBR; 3	HUN; Ret	LEC; 4	3rd	67

=== Complete Asian Le Mans Series results ===
(key) (Races in bold indicate pole position) (Races in italics indicate fastest lap)

Year	Team	Class	Car	Engine	1	2	3	4	5	Pos.	Points
2014	AAI-Rstrada	GT	BMW Z4 GT3	BMW 4.4 L V8	INJ; 3	FUJ	SHA; 2	SEP; 2		4th	52
2015–16	Team AAI	GT	BMW Z4 GT3	BMW 4.4 L V8	FUJ; Ret	SEP; 2	BUR; 3	SEP; 2		4th	51
2016–17	FIST-Team AAI	GT	BMW M6 GT3	BMW S63 4.4 L Turbo V8	ZHU; Ret	FUJ; 3	CHA; 5	SEP; 7		8th	31
2017–18	FIST-Team AAI	GT	Mercedes-AMG GT3	Mercedes-AMG M159 6.2 L V8	ZHU; 2					6th	41
2017–18	FIST-Team AAI	GT	Ferrari 488 GT3	Ferrari F154CB 3.9 L Turbo V8		FUJ; 1	BUR; 3	SEP; 2		6th	41
2021	Inception Racing with Optimum Motorsport	GT	McLaren 720S GT3	McLaren M840T 4.0 L Turbo V8	DUB; 1; 2	DUB; 2; 6	ABU; 1; 10	ABU; 2; 2		4th	45
2022	Inception Racing with Optimum Motorsport	GT	McLaren 720S GT3	McLaren M840T 4.0 L Turbo V8	**DUB**; **1**; 1	DUB; 2; 2	ABU; 1; 2	ABU; 2; 5		1st	72
2023	HubAuto Racing	GT	Mercedes-AMG GT3 Evo	Mercedes-AMG M159 6.2 L V8	DUB; 1 Ret	DUB; 2; 9	**ABU**; **1**; 14	**ABU**; **2**; 16		12th	12
2023–24	Optimum Motorsport	GT	McLaren 720S GT3 Evo	McLaren M840T 4.0 L Turbo V8	SEP; 1; 17	SEP; 2; 3	DUB; 6	YMC; 1; 3	YMC; 2; 14	6th	38

=== Complete International GT Open results ===
(key) (Races in bold indicate pole position) (Races in italics indicate fastest lap)

Year	Team	Car	Class	1	2	3	4	5	6	7	8	9	10	11	12	13	14	Pos.	Points
2020	Optimum Motorsport	McLaren 720S GT3	Pro-Am	HUN; 1; 3	HUN; 2; 6	LEC; 1; 2	LEC; 2; 3	RBR; 1; 4	RBR; 2; 6	MNZ; 1; 3	MNZ; 2; 3	SPA; 1; 3	SPA; 2; 4	CAT; 1; 5	CAT; 2; 2			5th	49
2021	Inception Racing	McLaren 720S GT3	Pro-Am	LEC; 1; 2	LEC; 2; 2	SPA; 1; 1	SPA; 2; 4	HUN; 1; 1	HUN; 2; 2	IMO; 1; 3	IMO; 2; 3	RBR; 1; 2	RBR; 2; 4	MNZ; 1; 1	MNZ; 2; 2	CAT; 1; 3	CAT; 2; 2	1st	88

=== Complete 24 Hours of Le Mans results ===
Year	Team	Co-Drivers	Car	Class	Laps	Pos.	Class Pos.
2021	(United Kingdom) Inception Racing	(United Kingdom) Ben Barnicoat (United States) Brendan Iribe	Ferrari 488 GTE Evo	GTE; Am	327	41st	12th
2022	(Germany) Team Project 1	(United Kingdom) Ben Barnicoat (United States) Brendan Iribe	Porsche 911 RSR-19	GTE; Am	241	DNF	DNF
2024	(United Kingdom) Inception Racing	(United States) Brendan Iribe (Denmark) Frederik Schandorff	McLaren 720S GT3 Evo	LMGT3	275	40th	13th

=== Complete IMSA SportsCar Championship results ===
(key) (Races in bold indicate pole position; results in italics indicate fastest lap)

Year	Team	Class	Make	Engine	1	2	3	4	5	6	7	8	9	10	11	12	Pos.	Points
2022	Inception Racing	GTD	McLaren 720S GT3	McLaren M840T 4.0 L Turbo V8	DAY; 5	SEB; 5	LBH	LGA	MDO	DET	WGL; 2	MOS	LIM	ELK	VIR	PET	27th	884
2023	Inception Racing	GTD	McLaren 720S GT3 Evo	McLaren M840T 4.0 L Turbo V8	DAY; 3	SEB; 4	LBH	MON	WGL; 15	MOS	LIM	ELK	VIR	IMS	PET; 19		31st	956
2024	Inception Racing	GTD	McLaren 720S GT3 Evo	McLaren M840T 4.0 L Turbo V8	DAY; 13	SEB; 7	LBH	LGA	WGL; 21	MOS	ELK	VIR					33rd	1086
2024	Inception Racing	GTD	Ferrari 296 GT3	Ferrari F163CE 3.0 L Turbo V6									IMS; 9	PET; 7			33rd	1086
2025	Inception Racing	GTD	Ferrari 296 GT3	Ferrari F163CE 3.0 L Turbo V6	DAY; 19	SEB; 4	LBH	LGA	WGL; 2	MOS	ELK	VIR	IMS; 1	PET; 18			22nd	1285
2026	Inception Racing	GTD	Ferrari 296 GT3 Evo	Ferrari F163CE 3.0 L Turbo V6	DAY; 13	SEB; 17	LBH	LGA	WGL; 18	MOS	ELK; 8	VIR	IMS	PET			45th	739
