= Josef Kaufmann Racing =

(Germany) Josef Kaufmann Racing
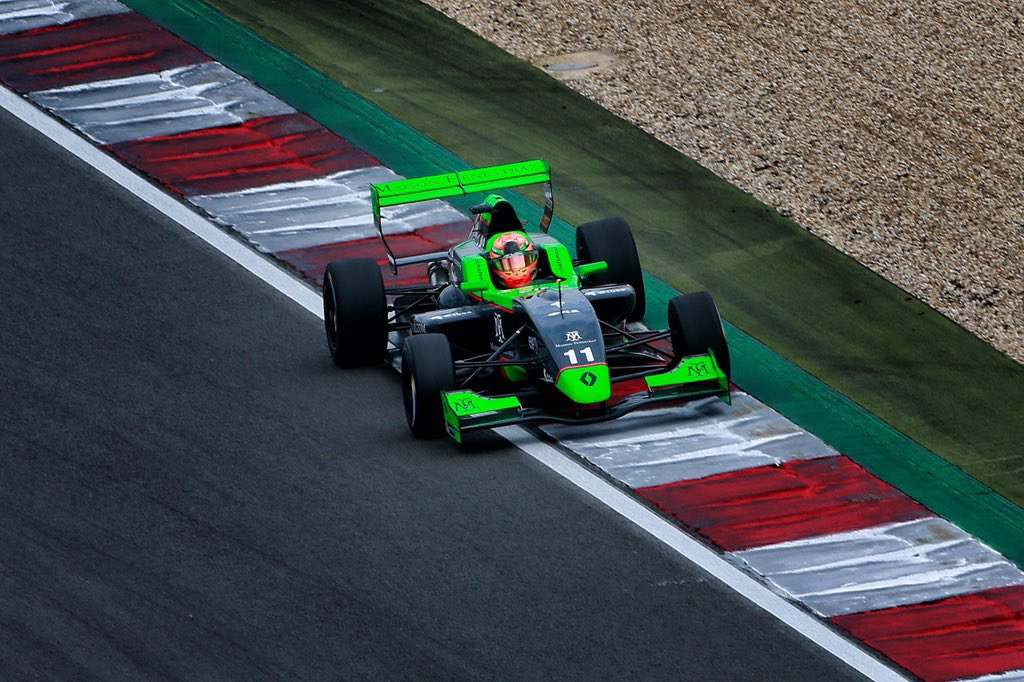
- Founded: 1982
- Founder(s): Josef Kaufmann
- Base: Wolsfeld, Germany
- Team principal(s): Lars Kaufmann
- Former series: Formula BMW Europe; Formula BMW ADAC; Formula Renault Germany; German Formula Three Championship; Eurocup Formula Renault 2.0; Formula Renault 2.0 NEC
- Teams' Championships: Formula BMW Europe: 2008, 2010; Eurocup Formula Renault 2.0: 2012, 2015-2016; Formula Renault 2.0 NEC: 2014, 2015-2016
- Drivers' Championships: German Formula Three Championship: 1985: Volker Weidler; 1994: Arnd Meier (B-Cup); Formula Renault Germany: 1991: Joachim Beule; Formula BMW ADAC: 2005: Nico Hülkenberg; 2006: Christian Vietoris; Formula BMW Europe: 2008: Esteban Gutiérrez; 2010: Robin Frijns; Eurocup Formula Renault 2.0: 2011: Robin Frijns; 2012: Stoffel Vandoorne; 2016: Lando Norris; 2017: Sacha Fenestraz; Formula Renault 2.0 NEC: 2015: Louis Delétraz; 2016: Lando Norris
- Website: http://www.jk-racing.de/

Josef Kaufmann Racing is a motorsport team from Germany. It mainly operates in the Eurocup Formula Renault 2.0 as well as Formula Renault 2.0 Northern European Cup. The team was founded in 1982.

== History ==
In 1982, Josef Kaufmann Racing was founded by Josef Kaufmann, who was a racing driver and raced in his own team in the German Formula Three Championship. In the first year of the team's existence Gerhard Berger and Kaufmann finished third and fourth respectively in the German Formula 3. Josef Kaufmann Racing first drivers' title was achieved by Volker Weidler, who won the German Formula Three Championship in 1985. Their next success was in 1994, when Arnd Meier won B-Cup of the German F3 Championship. The team remained in the German Formula Three Championship till 2002.

In 2003 the team decided to concentrate on Formula BMW ADAC championship, which they joined in 2002. Nico Hülkenberg won their first Formula BMW ADAC title in 2005. The success was repeated in the following year by Christian Vietoris. In 2008, ADAC series was merged with UK series into Formula BMW Europe. Esteban Gutiérrez brought their first title in the series and with help of Kazeem Manzur and Marco Wittmann their first teams' title ever. The team repeated titles in both the drivers' and teams' championships in 2010 with Robin Frijns.

As Formula BMW Europe was folded, the German outfit decided to move to Eurocup Formula Renault 2.0 in 2011 and Frijns won another drivers' title for the team. Stoffel Vandoorne achieved their second Eurocup title in the following season. Lando Norris collected another Eurocup drivers' championship for the German squad in 2016. Also the team won the teams' championship in Formula Renault 2.0 Northern European Cup in 2014 and 2015, as well as drivers' title for Louis Delétraz.

For the 2017 and seasons, the team signed Sacha Fenestraz, Luis Leeds and French F4 champion Yifei Ye. The team failed to defend teams' title but Sacha Fenestraz achieved drivers' title.

In 2018, the team retained Ye and hired former Red Bull Junior Richard Verschoor and karting champion and Toyota Racing Series race winner Clément Novalak, with Ye claiming third in the drivers' standings. At the end of the season, the team withdrew from the championship.

== Former series results ==
=== Formula BMW ADAC ===
Formula BMW ADAC results
Year	Car	Drivers	Races	Wins	Poles	F.L.	Podiums	Points	D.C.	T.C.
2002	Mygale FB02–BMW	(Austria) Hannes Neuhauser	20	1	2	1	4	145	3rd	N/A
2003	Mygale FB02–BMW	(Austria) Christopher Wassermann	20	1	0	0	1	62	12th	N/A
2003	Mygale FB02–BMW	(Austria) Christian Paar	20	0	0	0	1	36	15th	N/A
2004	Mygale FB02–BMW	(South Africa) Adrian Zaugg	20	0	0	0	0	55	7th	N/A
2004	Mygale FB02–BMW	(Germany) Benjamin Leuchter	20	0	0	0	0	4	19th	N/A
2005	Mygale FB02–BMW	(Germany) Nico Hülkenberg	20	8	9	6	13	287	1st	N/A
2005	Mygale FB02–BMW	(Netherlands) Nick de Bruijn	20	0	2	1	3	109	5th	N/A
2005	Mygale FB02–BMW	(Switzerland) Natacha Gachnang	20	0	0	0	3	90	6th	N/A
2006	Mygale FB02–BMW	(Germany) Christian Vietoris	18	9	9	3	16	277	1st	N/A
2006	Mygale FB02–BMW	(Netherlands) Nick de Bruijn	18	1	1	3	5	120	5th	N/A
2006	Mygale FB02–BMW	(Germany) Patrick Kronenberg	10	0	0	0	0	8	17th	N/A
2006	Mygale FB02–BMW	(Spain) Daniel Campos-Hull	8	0	0	0	0	4	18th	N/A
2007	Mygale FB02–BMW	(France) Adrien Tambay	18	2	2	0	7	573	4th	2nd
2007	Mygale FB02–BMW	(Germany) Marco Wittmann	18	2	4	2	6	570	5th	2nd
2007	Mygale FB02–BMW	(Netherlands) Mathjis Harkema	18	0	0	0	0	376	9th	2nd

=== Formula BMW Europe ===
Formula BMW Europe results
Year	Car	Drivers	Races	Wins	Poles	F.L.	Podiums	Points	D.C.	T.C.
2008	Mygale FB02–BMW	(Mexico) Esteban Gutiérrez	16	7	3	8	12	353	1st	1st
2008	Mygale FB02–BMW	(Germany) Marco Wittmann	16	1	1	1	11	327	2nd	1st
2008	Mygale FB02–BMW	(United Kingdom) Kazeem Manzur	16	0	0	0	0	48	18th	1st
2009	Mygale FB02–BMW	(Netherlands) Robin Frijns	16	1	1	1	6	265	3rd	2nd
2009	Mygale FB02–BMW	(Spain) Facundo Regalia	16	0	0	0	0	148	8th	2nd
2009	Mygale FB02–BMW	(United Kingdom) Kazeem Manzur	16	0	0	0	2	107	11th	2nd
2010	Mygale FB02–BMW	(Netherlands) Robin Frijns	16	6	3	3	13	383	1st	1st
2010	Mygale FB02–BMW	(Netherlands) Hannes van Asseldonk	16	0	0	1	2	176	7th	1st
2010	Mygale FB02–BMW	(Finland) Petri Suvanto	16	0	0	0	0	100	11th	1st

=== Eurocup Formula Renault 2.0 ===
Eurocup Formula Renault 2.0 results
Year	Car	Drivers	Races	Wins	Poles	F.L.	Podiums	Points	D.C.	T.C.
2011	Barazi-Epsilon–Renault	(Netherlands) Robin Frijns	14	5	1	0	9	245	1st	2nd
2011	Barazi-Epsilon–Renault	(Colombia) Óscar Andrés Tunjo	14	0	0	0	0	58	10th	2nd
2011	Barazi-Epsilon–Renault	(France) Mathieu Jaminet	14	0	0	0	0	15	16th	2nd
2012	Barazi-Epsilon–Renault	(Belgium) Stoffel Vandoorne	14	4	6	3	11	245	1st	1st
2012	Barazi-Epsilon–Renault	(Spain) Alex Riberas	14	0	0	2	0	62	9th	1st
2012	Barazi-Epsilon–Renault	(Netherlands) Pieter Schothorst	14	0	0	0	0	2	28th	1st
2013	Barazi-Epsilon–Renault	(Colombia) Óscar Tunjo	14	0	0	0	2	99	6th	5th
2013	Barazi-Epsilon–Renault	(Netherlands) Steijn Schothorst	14	0	0	0	1	62	14th	5th
2013	Barazi-Epsilon–Renault	(Sweden) Gustav Malja	14	0	0	0	0	4	20th	5th
2014	Barazi-Epsilon–Renault	(Switzerland) Kevin Jörg	14	1	0	0	2	87	6th	5th
2014	Barazi-Epsilon–Renault	(Sweden) Gustav Malja	14	0	0	0	1	62	14th	5th
2014	Barazi-Epsilon–Renault	(United States) Ryan Tveter	12	0	0	0	0	1	23rd	5th
2014	Barazi-Epsilon–Renault	(Switzerland) Louis Delétraz	2	0	0	0	0	N/A	NC†	5th
2015	Barazi-Epsilon–Renault	(Switzerland) Louis Delétraz	14	3	0	0	2	87	2nd	1st
2015	Barazi-Epsilon–Renault	(Switzerland) Kevin Jörg	14	1	0	0	1	62	3rd	1st
2015	Barazi-Epsilon–Renault	(Russia) Nikita Mazepin	6	0	0	0	0	N/A	NC†	1st
2015	Barazi-Epsilon–Renault	(Belgium) Dries Vanthoor	2	0	0	0	0	N/A	NC†	1st
2016	Barazi-Epsilon–Renault	(United Kingdom) Lando Norris	15	5	6	4	12	253	1st	1st
2016	Barazi-Epsilon–Renault	(Russia) Robert Shwartzman	15	0	0	0	1	75	8th	1st
2016	Barazi-Epsilon–Renault	(India) Jehan Daruvala	15	0	0	1	1	62	9th	1st
2017	Barazi-Epsilon–Renault	(France) Sacha Fenestraz	23	7	9	5	18	367.5	1st	2nd
2017	Barazi-Epsilon–Renault	(China) Yifei Ye	23	0	0	1	3	106.5	8th	2nd
2017	Barazi-Epsilon–Renault	(Australia) Luis Leeds	23	0	0	0	0	7	19th	2nd
2018	Barazi-Epsilon–Renault	(United Kingdom) Clément Novalak	4	0	0	0	0	0	23rd	3rd
2018	Barazi-Epsilon–Renault	(Netherlands) Richard Verschoor	4	0	0	0	0	6	15th	3rd
2018	Barazi-Epsilon–Renault	(China) Yifei Ye	4	1	1	2	3	58	2nd	3rd

^{†} Guest driver, who was ineligible for championship points.

=== Formula Renault 2.0 Northern European Cup ===
Formula Renault 2.0 Northern European Cup results
Year	Car	Drivers	Races	Wins	Poles	F.L.	Podiums	Points	D.C.	T.C.
2010	Barazi-Epsilon–Renault	(Netherlands) Robin Frijns	3	1	0	1	2	70	14th	N/A
2010	Barazi-Epsilon–Renault	(France) Côme Ledogar	5	0	0	0	0	59	16th	N/A
2011	Barazi-Epsilon–Renault	(Netherlands) Robin Frijns	12	1	1	2	7	238	4th	5th
2011	Barazi-Epsilon–Renault	(Colombia) Óscar Andrés Tunjo	7	0	0	0	1	63	23rd	5th
2011	Barazi-Epsilon–Renault	(France) Mathieu Jaminet	5	0	0	0	0	27	31st	5th
2012	Barazi-Epsilon–Renault	(Belgium) Stoffel Vandoorne	7	5	4	5	6	176	9th	4th
2012	Barazi-Epsilon–Renault	(Spain) Alex Riberas	6	1	2	0	0	97	16th	4th
2012	Barazi-Epsilon–Renault	(Netherlands) Pieter Schothorst	8	0	0	0	0	45	30th	4th
2013	Barazi-Epsilon–Renault	(Norway) Dennis Olsen	16	0	1	0	3	211	3rd	N/A
2013	Barazi-Epsilon–Renault	(Netherlands) Steijn Schothorst	10	3	2	2	4	202	5th	N/A
2013	Barazi-Epsilon–Renault	(Colombia) Óscar Tunjo	7	1	3	1	3	118	13th	N/A
2013	Barazi-Epsilon–Renault	(Sweden) Gustav Malja	7	0	0	0	2	98	15th	N/A
2014	Barazi-Epsilon–Renault	(Switzerland) Louis Delétraz	15	1	1	0	5	242	2nd	1st
2014	Barazi-Epsilon–Renault	(Sweden) Gustav Malja	14	2	1	1	4	193	5th	1st
2014	Barazi-Epsilon–Renault	(United States) Ryan Tveter	15	0	0	0	1	150	9th	1st
2014	Barazi-Epsilon–Renault	(Switzerland) Kevin Jörg	7	2	3	3	3	118	13th	1st
2015	Barazi-Epsilon–Renault	(Switzerland) Louis Delétraz	16	9	12	8	12	378	1st	1st
2015	Barazi-Epsilon–Renault	(Switzerland) Kevin Jörg	16	2	2	3	11	305	2nd	1st
2015	Barazi-Epsilon–Renault	(Belgium) Dries Vanthoor	16	1	0	0	2	181	6th	1st
2015	Barazi-Epsilon–Renault	(Russia) Nikita Mazepin	16	0	0	0	1	125.5	12th	1st
2016	Barazi-Epsilon–Renault	(United Kingdom) Lando Norris	15	6	10	4	11	326	1st	1st
2016	Barazi-Epsilon–Renault	(India) Jehan Daruvala	15	1	1	2	5	223	4th	1st
2016	Barazi-Epsilon–Renault	(Russia) Robert Shwartzman	15	2	1	2	2	206	6th	1st
2017	Barazi-Epsilon–Renault	(France) Sacha Fenestraz	7	5	4	3	7	108	6th	2nd
2017	Barazi-Epsilon–Renault	(China) Yifei Ye	7	2	2	2	5	104	8th	2nd
2017	Barazi-Epsilon–Renault	(United Kingdom) James Pull	4	0	0	0	0	28‡	13th‡	2nd
2017	Barazi-Epsilon–Renault	(Australia) Luis Leeds	5	0	0	0	0	28	19th	2nd
2018	Barazi-Epsilon–Renault	(United Kingdom) Clément Novalak	6	0	0	0	0	0	NC†	NC†
2018	Barazi-Epsilon–Renault	(Netherlands) Richard Verschoor	2	0	0	0	0	0	NC†	NC†
2018	Barazi-Epsilon–Renault	(China) Yifei Ye	8	1	0	0	5	0	NC†	NC†

‡Shared position and points for the other team.

† ineligible for championship points.

== Timeline ==
Former series
German Formula Three Championship	1982–1990, 1994–2002, 2006–2008
Formula Renault Germany	1991–1993
Formula BMW ADAC	2002–2007
Formula BMW Europe	2008–2010
Formula Renault 2.0 Northern European Cup	2010–2018
Eurocup Formula Renault 2.0	2011–2018

Achievements
Preceded by none	Formula BMW Europe Teams' Champion; 2008	Succeeded by Eurointernational
Preceded by Eurointernational	Formula BMW Europe Teams' Champion; 2010	Succeeded by none
Preceded by Koiranen GP	Eurocup Formula Renault 2.0 Teams' Champion; 2012	Succeeded by Tech 1 Racing
Preceded by Fortec Motorsports	Formula Renault 2.0 NEC Teams' Champion; 2014-2016	Succeeded by R-ace GP
Preceded by Koiranen GP	Eurocup Formula Renault 2.0 Teams' Champion; 2015-2016	Succeeded by R-ace GP
