= Jim Pla =

French racing driver (born 1992)

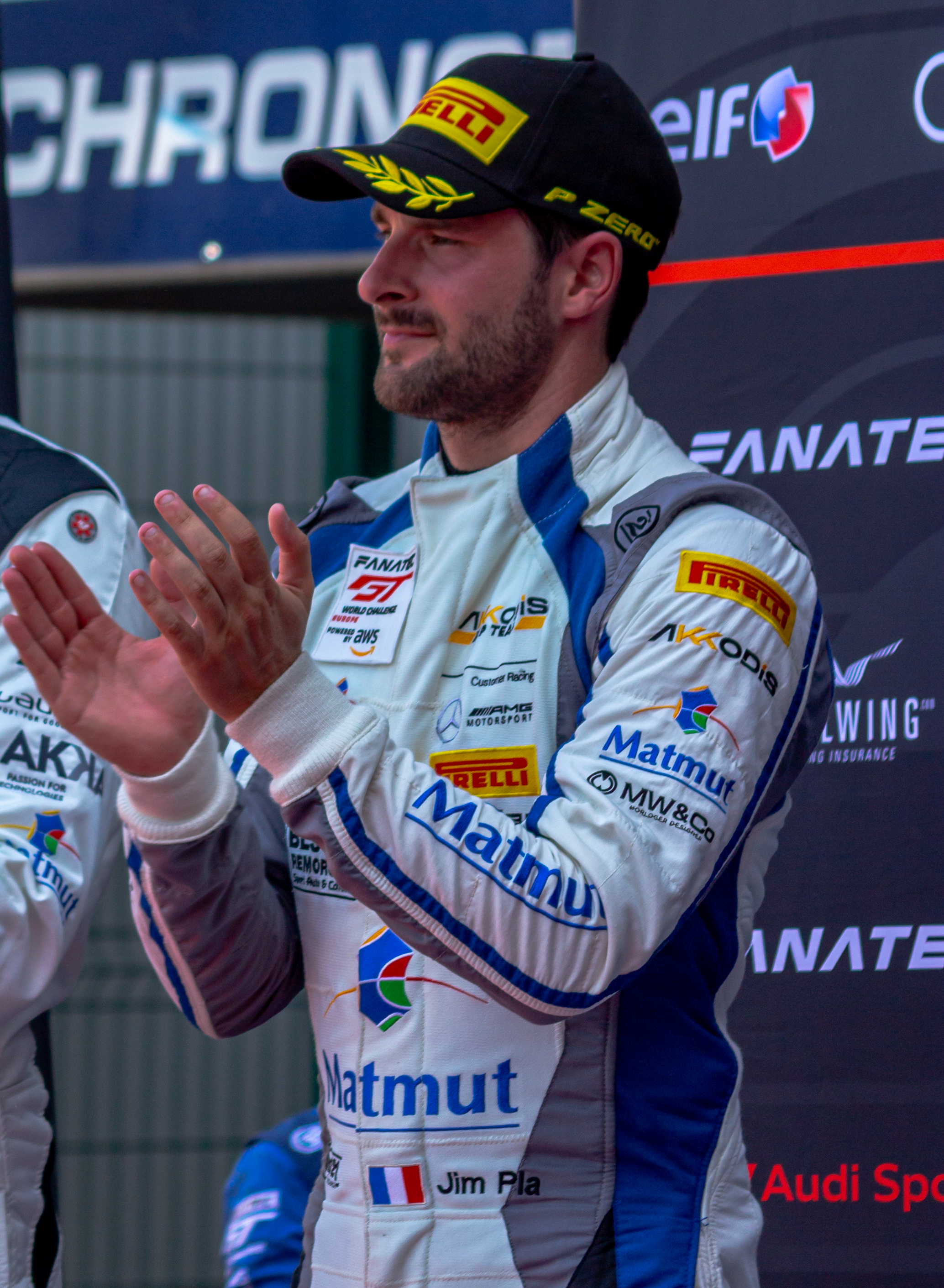
- Pla in 2022
- Nationality: (France) French
- Born: 6 October 1992 (age 34) Béziers (France)

Porsche Carrera Cup France career
- Debut season: 2013
- Current team: Nourry Competition
- Categorisation: FIA Silver (until 2021); FIA Gold (2022–)

Previous series
- 2010 2010 2009 2008–09 2007: Formula 3 Euro Series; GP3 Series; Formula BMW Pacific; Formula BMW Europe; FR Campus France

Jim Pla (born 6 October 1992 in Béziers) is a French racing driver.

== Career ==
=== Formula Renault Campus France ===
Pla began his formula racing career in the 2007 Formula Renault Campus France season. He finished sixth overall in the championship, with one win and 70.5 points.

=== Formula BMW ===
The following season, Pla competed in the Formula BMW Europe for DAMS. He finished seventeenth in standings, taking five points-scoring positions in sixteen races. For 2009, Pla remained in the series, staying with DAMS. He finished fifth behind Danish driver Michael Christensen in the championship with four wins in row at Valencia Street Circuit, and Circuit de Spa-Francorchamps.

=== Formula Three ===
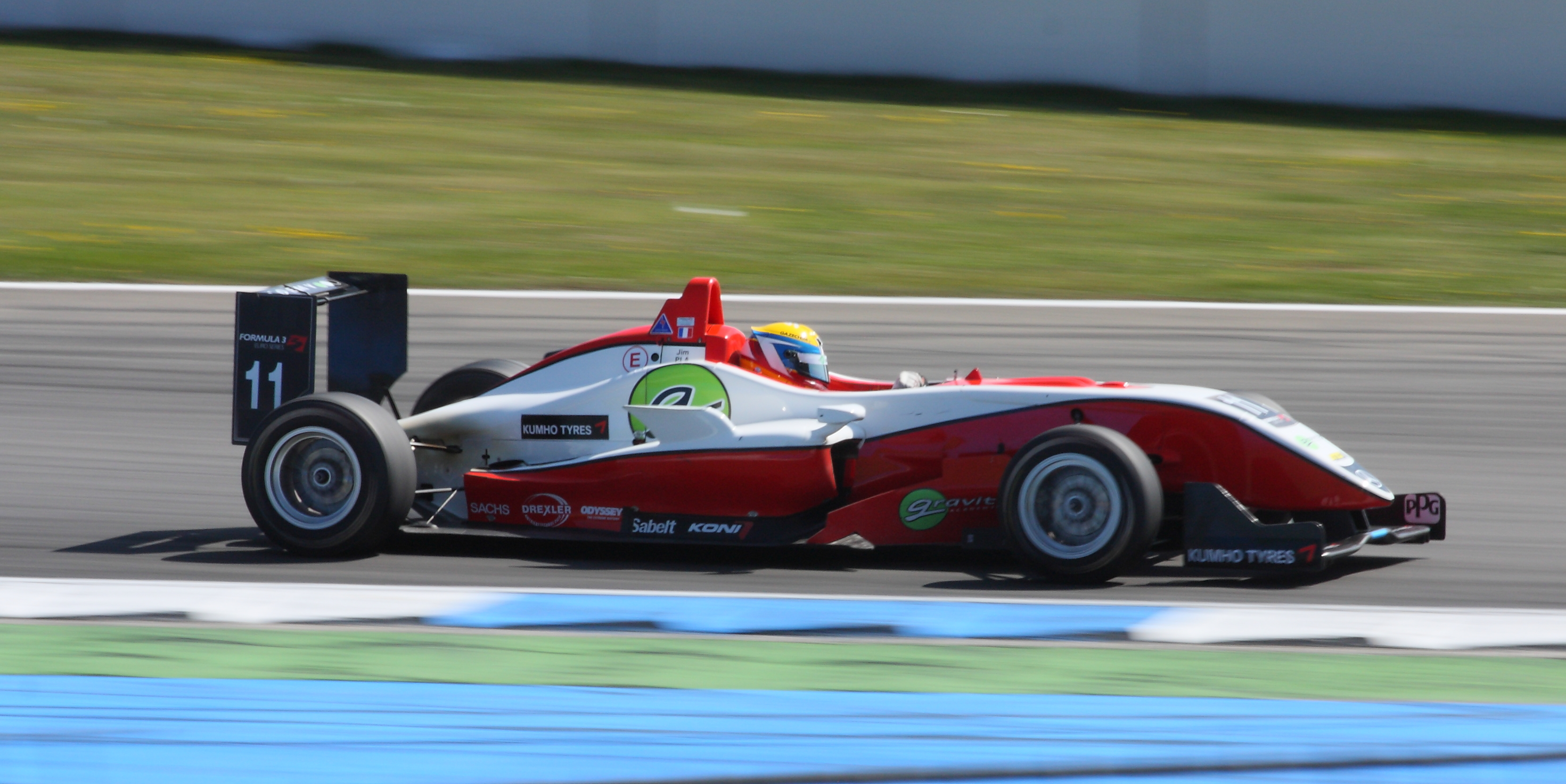
Pla competing at the second round of the 2010 Formula 3 Euro Series at Hockenheim.

2010 saw Pla move to the Formula 3 Euro Series, competing for multiple champions ART Grand Prix, joining Valtteri Bottas and Alexander Sims at the team. He finished tenth in the championship with one win and four points finishes out of 18 races. For 2011, Pla was set to switch to the Signature Team.

=== GP3 Series ===
Pla made his debut in GP3 Series at Istanbul Park round replacing his fellow Formula Renault Campus rival Jean-Éric Vergne.

== Racing record ==
=== Career summary ===
Season	Series	Team	Races	Wins	Poles	F/Laps	Podiums	Points	Position
2007	Formula Campus Renault	Formule Campus	13	1	3	2	4	70.5	6th
2008	Formula BMW Europe	DAMS	16	0	0	0	0	54	17th
2008	Formula BMW World Final	DAMS	1	0	0	0	0	N/A	8th
2009	Formula BMW Europe	DAMS	16	4	3	2	6	222	5th
2009	Formula BMW Pacific	EuroInternational	1	0	0	0	1	N/A	NC†
2010	Formula 3 Euro Series	ART Grand Prix	18	1	0	0	1	13	10th
2010	British Formula 3 International Series	ART Grand Prix	6	0	0	0	0	0	NC†
2010	Masters of Formula 3	ART Grand Prix	0	0	0	0	0	N/A	DNF
2010	GP3 Series	Tech 1 Racing	2	0	0	0	0	0	36th
2013	Porsche Carrera Cup France	Nourry Competition	12	0	1	1	3	171	**3rd**
2014	Porsche Carrera Cup Germany	TECE MRS Racing	12	0	0	0	0	32	21st
2015	Porsche Carrera Cup France	Racing Technology	12	0	0	2	5	149	5th
2016	Porsche Carrera Cup France	Racing Technology	2	0	0	0	0	0	NC†
2017	GT4 European Series Southern Cup – Pro-Am	Racing Technology	12	1	0	0	1	72	6th
2018	French GT4 Cup – Pro-Am	AKKA ASP Team	12	2	0	1	5	139	**2nd**
2018	FIA GT Nations Cup	Team France	3	0	0	1	0	N/A	DNF
2019	French GT4 Cup – Pro-Am	AKKA ASP Team	11	1	2	4	2	80	8th
2019	GT World Challenge Europe	AKKA ASP Team	10	0	0	0	0	0	NC
2019	GT World Challenge Europe – Pro-Am	AKKA ASP Team	10	1	4	3	5	96.5	3rd
2019	Blancpain GT Series Endurance Cup	AKKA ASP Team	4	0	0	0	0	0	NC
2019	FIA Motorsport Games GT Cup	Team France	3	0	0	0	0	N/A	4th
2020	GT World Challenge Europe Endurance Cup	AKKA ASP Team	3	0	0	0	0	0	NC
2020	GT World Challenge Europe Sprint Cup	AKKA ASP Team	9	0	0	0	0	14	17th
2020	GT World Challenge Europe Sprint Cup - Silver	AKKA ASP Team	9	1	1	0	3	66.5	5th
2020	GT4 European Series – Pro-Am	AKKA ASP Team	2	0	1	2	0	0	NC†
2020	French GT4 Cup – Pro-Am	AKKA ASP Team	12	3	2	3	3	112	5th
2021	GT World Challenge Europe Endurance Cup	GetSpeed Performance							
2021	GT World Challenge Europe Sprint Cup	AKKA ASP Team	10	0	0	0	0	23	12th
2021	GT World Challenge Europe Sprint Cup – Silver	AKKA ASP Team	10	3	1	2	5	82.5	**3rd**
2021	International GT Open	AKKA ASP Team	2	0	1	1	2	0	NC†
2021	GT4 European Series – Pro-Am	AKKA ASP Team	12	1	3	3	5	164	**2nd**
2021	French GT4 Cup – Pro-Am	AKKA ASP Team	12	0	1	1	2	92	7th
2022	GT World Challenge Europe Endurance Cup	GetSpeed Performance	1	0	0	0	0	0	NC
2022	GT World Challenge Europe Sprint Cup	AKKodis ASP Team	10	0	0	2	3	54	5th
2022	GT4 European Series – Pro-Am	AKKODIS ASP	11	3	1	5	6	153	**1st**
2023	GT World Challenge Europe Sprint Cup	AKKodis ASP Team	6	0	0	0	0	0	NC
2023	GT World Challenge Europe Sprint Cup – Bronze	AKKodis ASP Team	6	0	0	0	0	10.5	12th
2023	Lamborghini Super Trofeo Europe – Pro-Am	Scuderia Villorba Corse							
2023	GT4 European Series – Pro-Am	Team Speedcar	2	0	1	0	0	7	24th
2024	International GT Open	Scuderia Villorba Corse	9	0	0	0	0	0	39th
2024	International GT Open	Saintéloc Racing	1	0	0	0	0	0	39th
2024	GT World Challenge Europe Endurance Cup	Saintéloc Racing	5	0	0	0	0	0	NC
2024	GT World Challenge Europe Endurance Cup - Gold	Saintéloc Racing	5	3	1	0	5	140	**1st**
2024	Gulf 12 Hours - Pro-Am	Saintéloc Racing	1	0	0	0	1	N/A	**2nd**
2024	French GT4 Cup – Pro-Am	L'Espace Bienvenue							
2024	Ultimate Cup Series GT Endurance Cup – UCS3	Signatech Alpine	1	1	0	0	1	25	**3rd**
2025	GT World Challenge Europe Sprint Cup	CSA Racing	8	0	0	0	0	0.5	28th
2025	GT World Challenge Europe Endurance Cup	CSA Racing	1	0	0	0	0	0	NC
2025	International GT Open	Saintéloc Racing	1	0	0	0	0	0	NC†
2026	GT3 Revival Series	Storic and Race Cars							
2026	International GT Open	Saintéloc Racing	13	0	0	0	0	17	20th
2026	GT World Challenge Europe Sprint Cup	Saintéloc Racing	2	0	0	0	0	0	NC
2026	GT World Challenge Europe Endurance Cup	CSA Racing	2	0	0	0	0	0	NC

=== Complete Formula 3 Euro Series results ===
(key)

Year	Entrant	Chassis	Engine	1	2	3	4	5	6	7	8	9	10	11	12	13	14	15	16	17	18	DC	Points
2010	ART Grand Prix	Dallara F308/070	Mercedes	LEC; 1; 7	LEC; 2; 11	HOC1; 1; 13	HOC1; 2; 6	VAL; 1 DNS	VAL; 2; 8	NOR; 1 Ret	NOR; 2; 8	NÜR; 1; 8	NÜR; 2; 4	ZAN; 1; 10	ZAN; 2; 13	BRH; 1; 13	BRH; 2; 12	OSC; 1; 9	OSC; 2; 1	HOC2; 1; 12	HOC2; 2; 11	10th	13

=== Complete GT World Challenge Europe results ===
==== GT World Challenge Europe Endurance Cup ====
(key) (Races in bold indicate pole position) (Races in italics indicate fastest lap)

Year	Team	Car	Class	1	2	3	4	5	6	7	Pos.	Points
2019	AKKA ASP Team	Mercedes-AMG GT3	Pro-Am	MNZ; Ret	SIL; 35	LEC; 23	SPA; 6H	SPA; 12H	SPA; 24H	**CAT**; 36	9th	48
2020	AKKA ASP Team	Mercedes-AMG GT3 Evo	Pro-Am	IMO; Ret	**NÜR**; 21	SPA; 6H; 53	SPA; 12H; 42	SPA; 24H; Ret	LEC		16th	21
2021	GetSpeed Performance	Mercedes-AMG GT3 Evo	Pro-Am	MNZ	LEC	SPA; 6H; 39	SPA; 12H; 28	SPA; 24H; Ret	NÜR; 29	CAT; 41	25th	12
2022	GetSpeed Performance	Mercedes-AMG GT3 Evo	Gold	IMO	LEC	SPA; 6H; 48	SPA; 12H; 41	SPA; 24H; 31	HOC	CAT	22nd	11
2024	Saintéloc Racing	Audi R8 LMS Evo II	Gold	LEC; 13	SPA; 6H; 37	SPA; 12H; 21	SPA; 24H; 15	**NÜR**; 15	MNZ; 26	JED; 18	1st	140
2025	CSA Racing	McLaren 720S GT3 Evo	Gold	LEC	MNZ	SPA; 6H; 14	SPA; 12H; 13	SPA; 24H; 13	NÜR	CAT	8th	33
2026	CSA Racing	McLaren 720S GT3 Evo	Gold	LEC	MNZ	SPA; 6H; 21	SPA; 12H; 14	SPA; 24H; 34	NÜR	ALG; 39	13th	30

==== GT World Challenge Europe Sprint Cup ====
(key) (Races in bold indicate pole position) (Races in italics indicate fastest lap)

Year	Team	Car	Class	1	2	3	4	5	6	7	8	9	10	Pos.	Points
2019	AKKA ASP Team	Mercedes-AMG GT3	Pro-Am	BRH; 1; 17	**BRH**; **2**; 15	MIS; 1; 19	**MIS**; **2**; 24	ZAN; 1; 23	**ZAN**; **2**; 22	NÜR; 1; 27	NÜR; 2; 21	HUN; 1; 21	**HUN**; **2**; 24	3rd	96.5
2020	AKKA ASP Team	Mercedes-AMG GT3 Evo	Silver	MIS; 1; 19	MIS; 2 Ret	MIS; 3 DNS	MAG; 1; 12	MAG; 2; 20	**ZAN**; **1**; 18	ZAN; 2; 9	CAT; 1; 4	CAT; 2; 6	CAT; 3; 9	5th	66.5
2021	AKKA ASP Team	Mercedes-AMG GT3 Evo	Silver	MAG; 1; 17	MAG; 2; 5	ZAN; 1; 6	ZAN; 2; 19	MIS; 1; 6	MIS; 2 Ret	BRH; 1; 11	BRH; 2; 7	VAL; 1; 10	**VAL**; **2**; 6	3rd	82.5
2022	AKKodis ASP Team	Mercedes-AMG GT3 Evo	Pro	BRH; 1; 4	BRH; 2; 3	MAG; 1; 10	MAG; 2; 2	ZAN; 1; 2	ZAN; 2; 4	MIS; 1; 10	MIS; 2; 6	VAL; 1; 13	VAL; 2; 12	5th	54
2023	AKKodis ASP Team	Mercedes-AMG GT3 Evo	Bronze	MIS; 1; 33	MIS; 2; 31	HOC; 1 Ret	HOC; 2; 31	VAL; 1; 27	VAL; 2 Ret					12th	10.5
2025	CSA Racing	McLaren 720S GT3 Evo	Pro	BRH; 1; 16	BRH; 2; 28	ZAN; 1; 20	ZAN; 2; 17	MIS; 1; 14	MIS; 2; 12	MAG; 1; 10	MAG; 2; 38	VAL; 1	VAL; 2	28th	0.5
2026	Saintéloc Racing	Audi R8 LMS Evo II	Bronze	MIS; 1	MIS; 2	MAG; 1; 38	MAG; 2 Ret	ZAN; 1	ZAN; 2	CAT; 1	CAT; 2			12th	1

^{*} Season still in progress.

== Personal life ==
He is of no relation to fellow French driver Olivier Pla. Pla list his hobbies as skiing, cinema, quad biking and soccer, while his favourite circuit is Circuit de Spa-Francorchamps, where he won twice during the 2009 Formula BMW Europe season.
