= Kazeem Manzur =

British racing driver

- Nationality: (United Kingdom) British
- Born: 8 July 1991 (age 35) Milton Keynes, England

Formula BMW Europe career
- Debut season: 2008
- Current team: Josef Kaufmann Racing
- Car number: 6
- Starts: 16
- Wins: 0
- Poles: 0
- Fastest laps: 0

Kazeem Manzur (born 8 July 1991) is a professional British racing driver, who races for Josef Kaufmann Racing in the Formula BMW Europe series. In 2008, Manzur became the first ever British-Asian racing driver to compete on the undercard of an FIA Formula One World Championship event and he scored a podium finish at just his second single-seater event in a Formula BMW race at the Sepang International Circuit, Malaysia.

== Karting ==
Prior to racing single-seater cars, Manzur competed at the highest level of international karting competition, racing in the CIK-FIA sanctioned KF1 category in 2007. He is the youngest ever driver to stand on the podium of a KF1 event and a former winner of the Pomposa Cup.

== Personal life ==
- Hobbies: karting, football, music
- Favourite driver: Kimi Räikkönen
- Favourite circuit: Circuit de Spa-Francorchamps
