= Valencia Street Circuit =

Street circuit in Valencia, Spain

- Grand Prix Circuit (2008–2012)
- Location: Valencia, Spain
- Coordinates: 39°27′31.6″N 0°19′32″W
- Opened: 26 July 2008; 18 years ago
- Closed: 2013
- Architect: Hermann Tilke
- Major events: Formula One; European Grand Prix (2008–2012); GP2 (2008–2012); GP3 (2010–2012); Porsche Supercup (2008–2010, 2012); Formula BMW Europe (2008–2010); International GT Open (2008); Spanish F3 (2008)
- Website: http://www.valenciastreetcircuit.com/index_eng.html

Grand Prix Circuit (2008–2012)
- Surface: Asphalt
- Length: 5.419 km (3.367 mi)
- Turns: 25
- Race lap record: 1:38.683 ( (Germany) Timo Glock, Toyota TF109, 2009, F1)

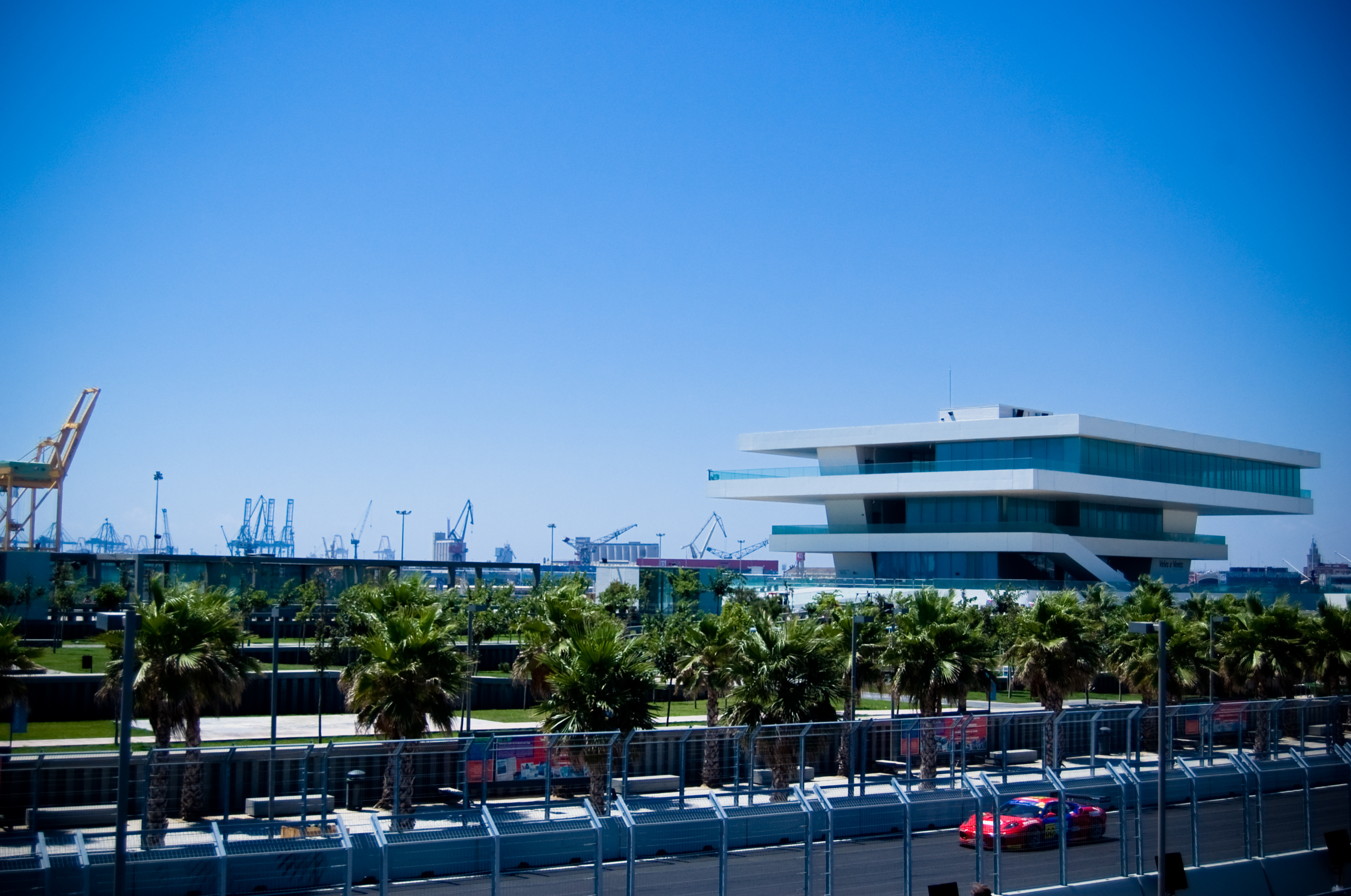
Valencia Street Circuit

The Valencia Street Circuit (Valencian: Circuit Urbà de València, Spanish: Circuito Urbano de Valencia) was a street circuit in Valencia, Spain which hosted the Formula One European Grand Prix for five years (2008–2012). The first Formula One race meeting on the circuit was held over the 23–24 August 2008 weekend, with Felipe Massa winning the main event, the European Grand Prix, after starting from pole position. The circuit used the roads skirting the city's harbour and America's Cup port area – including a section over a 140-metre-long (460 ft) swing bridge – and also included some roads designed exclusively for racing purposes by the German architect Hermann Tilke, who also designed the infrastructure buildings for the circuit. The 2012 edition took place on 24 June and was the last to go under the name of the European Grand Prix until 2016, when the Baku City Circuit used the title for one year. The circuit has been left abandoned after a deal fell through to alternate this venue with Catalunya in Barcelona to host the Spanish Grand Prix.

== History ==
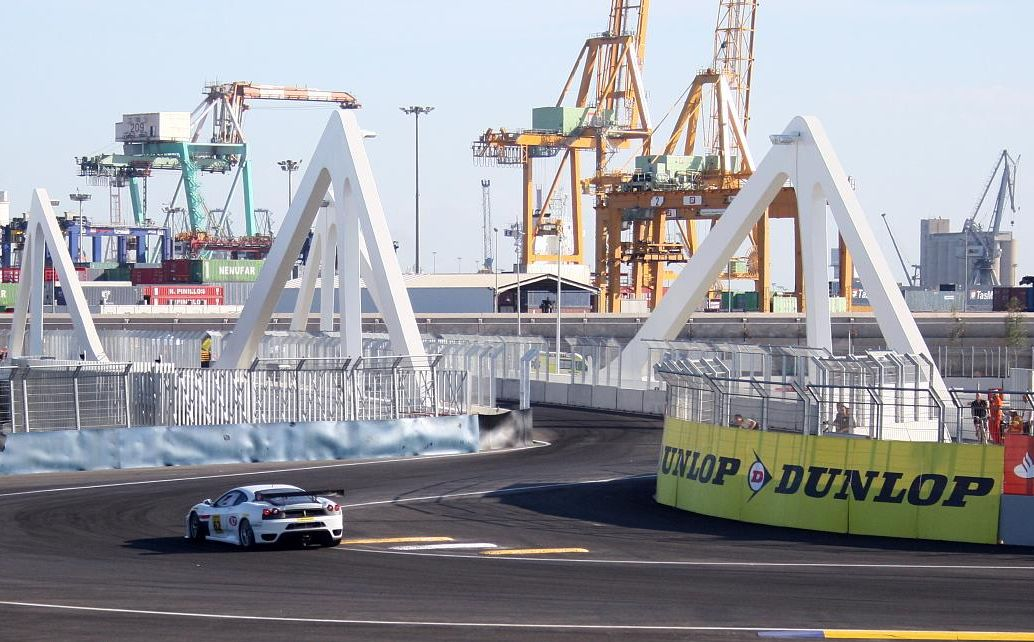
The swing bridge, an important element of the Valencia Street Circuit.

The deal to host the Valencia race was signed on 1 June 2007, and was for seven years. The deal was made between Formula One supremo Bernie Ecclestone and the Valmor Sport group, led by former motorcycle racer Jorge "Aspar" Martínez and Villarreal CF's president Fernando Roig. The deal came about despite Ecclestone previously stating that no European country should hold more than one race each year, as there was already a Spanish Grand Prix at the Circuit de Catalunya.

Initially, the deal was rumoured to be conditional on the People's Party winning regional elections on 27 May 2007. On 16 May, Ecclestone clarified his comments, explaining "I said I wouldn't formalise a contract until after the elections because I didn't know who I would be signing it with" and claiming his earlier statements had been taken out of context. Ecclestone was later cleared of influencing the election by the Valencian Electoral Commission.

The official track layout was unveiled by Valencia Councillor and transport counselor, Mario Flores, on 19 July 2007. The track was first used in the last weekend of July 2008, as the circuit hosted a round of the Spanish F3 Championship and International GT Open. It was first used for the European Grand Prix on 24 August 2008.

== Layout ==
The track was 5.419 km (3.367 mi) long and incorporated a total of 25 turns – 11 left-handers and 14 right-handers. It was estimated that the track had a top speed of around 323 km/h (201 mph), with a lap record of 1:38.683, set by Timo Glock during the 2009 European Grand Prix. Valencia was not as tight as Circuit de Monaco but overtaking opportunities were still scarce, due to the straights not being straight and the dust away from the racing line. Nico Hülkenberg noted there was quite a lot of space for a street circuit, and some corners had a lot of run-off area; Robert Kubica suggested that good traction and braking stability were crucial to win at the circuit, due to the number of long straights that ended in heavy braking zones.

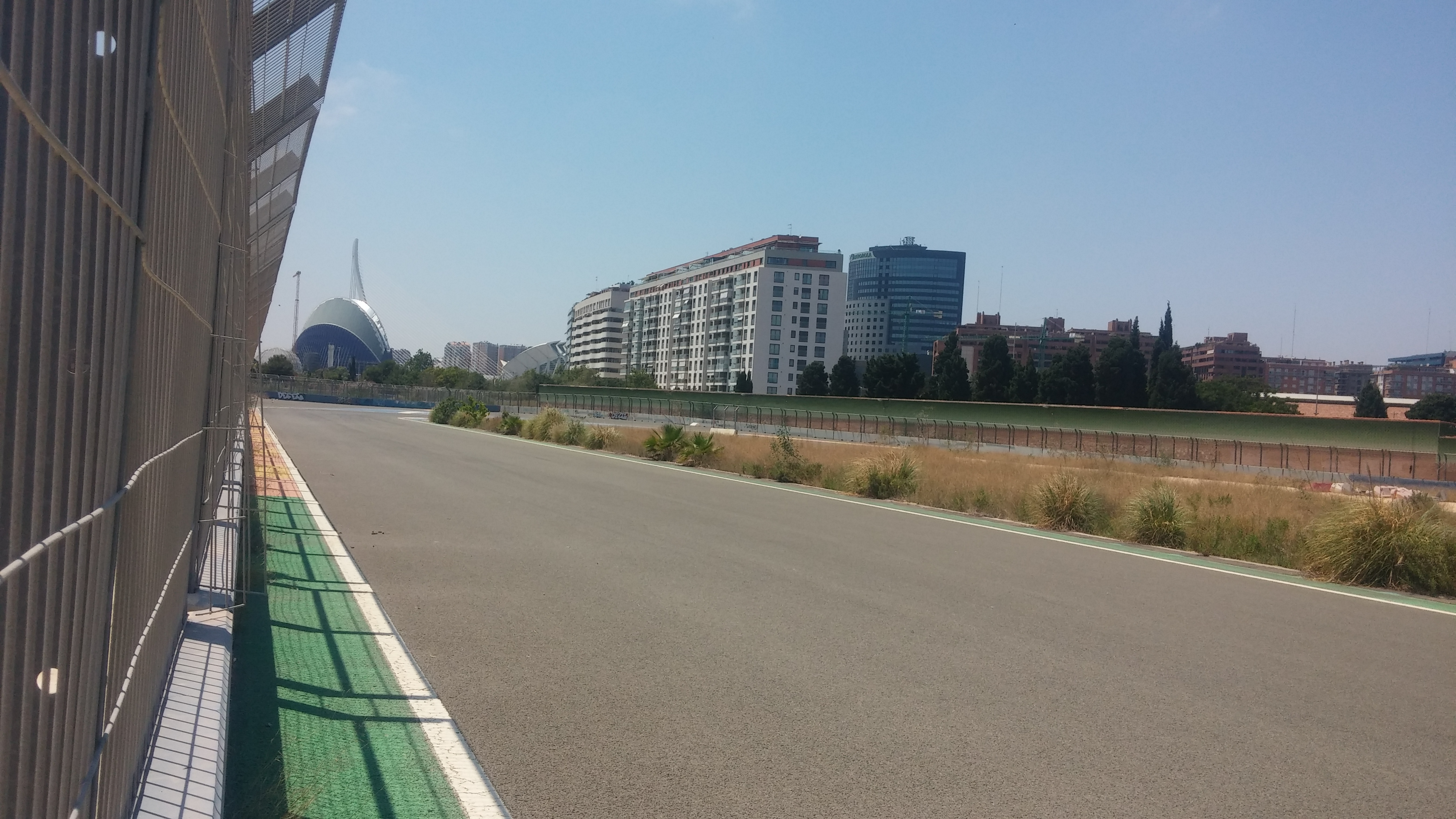
The abandoned Valencia Street Circuit in 2018

The circuit was criticised by drivers for its lack of overtaking opportunities. Changes in Formula One in 2011, including the introduction of the Drag Reduction System and the switch to Pirelli tyres, partially improved that with 27 passes recorded in that year's race, 22 of which were accredited to the assistance of DRS. However, the five 'normal' overtakes still represented the year's second lowest total, although the adoption of two DRS zones for that year's race limited the potential for non-DRS assisted passes. Despite this, the 2012 race was shown to have many different overtakes and became one of the most thrilling races of the season. It also had four retirements compared to zero during the 2011 race.

== A lap in a Formula One car ==
The pit straight is short and immediately leads into the flat-out turn 1 before cars heavily brake down to 97 km/h (60 mph) for the right-left complex of turns 2 and 3, passing the Grau Metro station. A curved 'straight' leads into a left-right chicane: turns 4 and 5, by the Neptune Hotel. Drivers exit the 137 km/h (85 mph) chicane by running very close to the wall, before sweeping through the kinks of turns 6 and 7, then braking heavily for the following swing bridge section. One of the slowest corners on the track, turn 8, with an apex speed of around 89 km/h (55 mph), leads drivers over the bridge before immediately braking again into the equally slow turn 10. Good traction is important out of here as the following section is a DRS zone with a top speed along the kinked 'straight' of around 320 km/h (200 mph), with a heavy braking zone for the 140 km/h (90 mph) turn 12/13 chicane; a 2nd-gear, right-left complex. Turn 14 is a medium speed right-hander before another, shorter DRS zone that leads through two left-hand kinks before the turn 17 hairpin at Museu de les Ciències Príncipe Felipe. Right-handed and a good spot for overtaking, turn 17 is taken at about 97 km/h (60 mph). A series of flat-out, or near flat-out sweeping curves follow, with the right-handers of turns 19 and 20 the most challenging of the bunch. Turn 25 is a hairpin, taken at about 97 km/h (60 mph); the run to the line following this left-hander is fairly short but requires good traction and acceleration for the best lap time.

== Lap records ==
The fastest official race lap records at the Valencia Street Circuit are listed as:

| Category | Time | Driver | Vehicle | Event |
Grand Prix Circuit (2008–2012): 5.419 km (3.367 mi)
| Formula One | 1:38.683 | Timo Glock | Toyota TF109 | 2009 European Grand Prix |
| GP2 | 1:46.487 | Nico Hülkenberg | Dallara GP2/08 | 2009 Valencia GP2 Series round |
| GP3 | 1:58.748 | Esteban Gutierrez | Dallara GP3/10 | 2010 Valencia GP3 Series round |
| Formula Three | 2:04.279 | Natacha Gachnang | Dallara F306 | 2008 2nd Valencia Spanish F3 round |
| GT2 | 2:07.423 | Richard Lietz | Porsche 911 (997 I) GT3 RSR | 2008 2nd Valencia International GT Open round |
| Porsche Carrera Cup | 2:10.070 | René Rast | Porsche 911 (997 II) GT3 Cup 3.8 | 2010 Valencia Porsche Supercup round |
| Formula BMW | 2:13.789 | Robin Frijns | Mygale FB02 | 2010 Valencia Formula BMW Europe round |

== See also ==
- List of Formula One circuits
- Circuit de Valencia – another motor racing circuit in Valencia used for MotoGP Valencian Community motorcycle Grand Prix.
