= Mygale FB02 =

Open-wheel race car

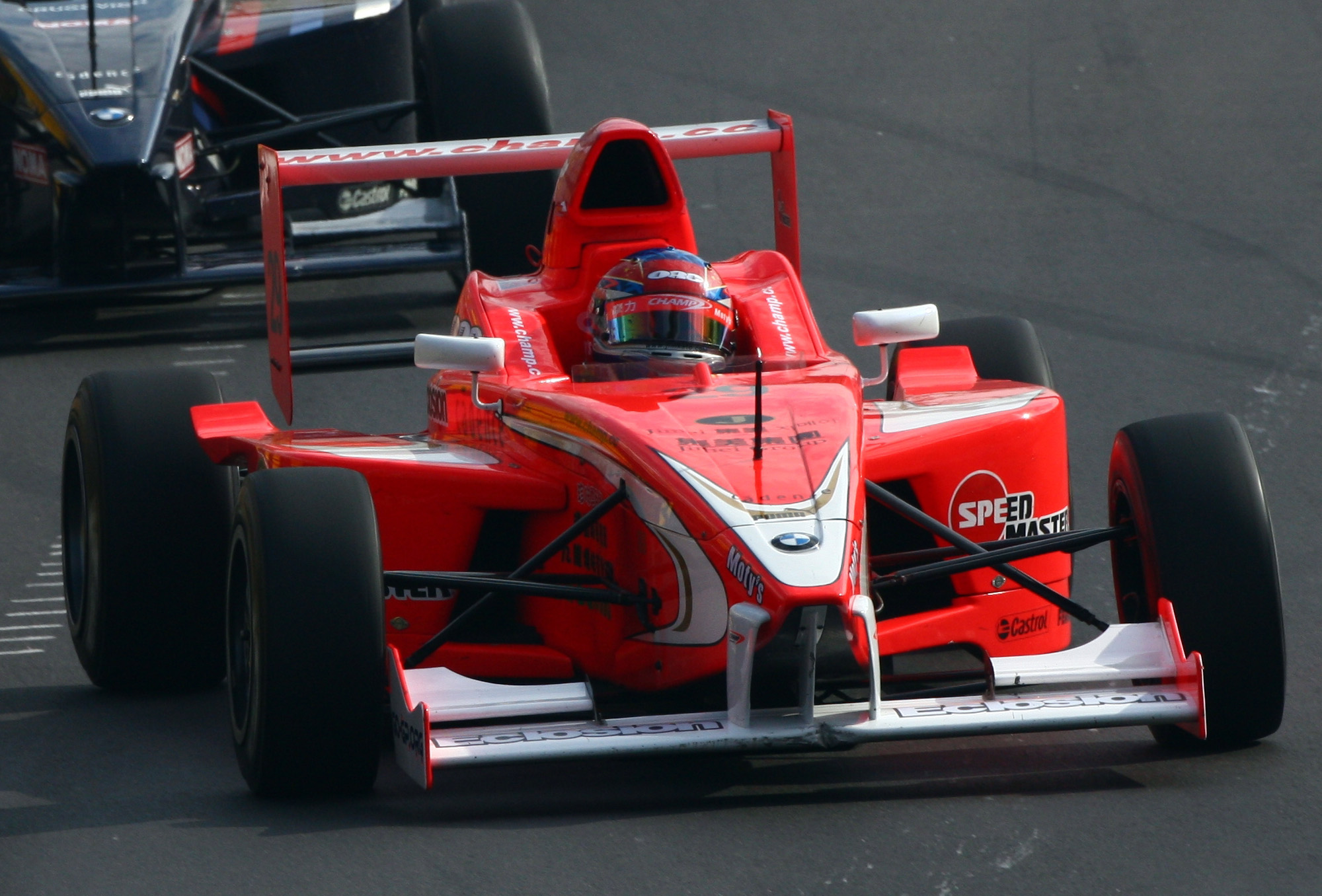
- Category: Formula BMW
- Constructor: Mygale/DesignworksUSA

Technical specifications
- Chassis: Carbon fiber/kevlar monocoque, fiberglass composite bodywork
- Length: 3,966–3,975 mm (156.1–156.5 in)
- Width: 1,695–1,740 mm (66.7–68.5 in)
- Height: 980 mm (39 in)
- Axle track: 1,515 mm (59.6 in) (front); 1,456 mm (57.3 in) (rear)
- Engine: BMW K1200RS 1.2 L (73 cu in) DOHC I4 naturally aspirated mid-mounted
- Transmission: Hewland FTR-200 6-speed sequential
- Power: 140 hp (100 kW)
- Weight: 465 kg (1,025 lb) (without driver); 550 kg (1,210 lb) (with driver)
- Tyres: Goodyear; Firestone

Competition history

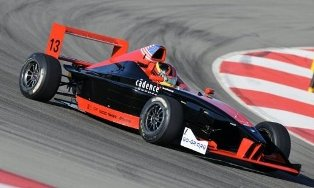
Formula BMW USA car

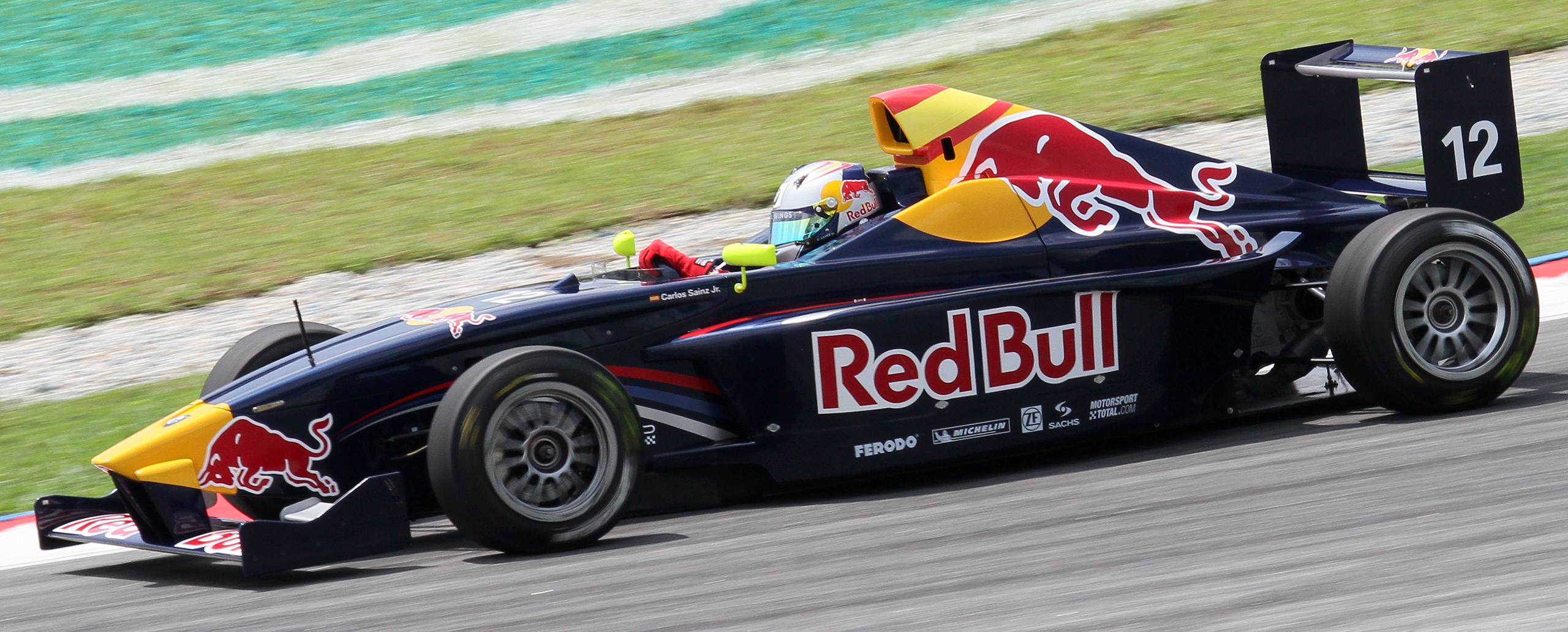
Formula BMW Asia car

The Mygale FB02 is an open-wheel formula race car, designed, developed and built French manufacturer and constructor Mygale, in collaboration and partnership with DesignworksUSA, for the one-make Formula BMW spec-series, between 1998 and 2013.

== Technical information ==
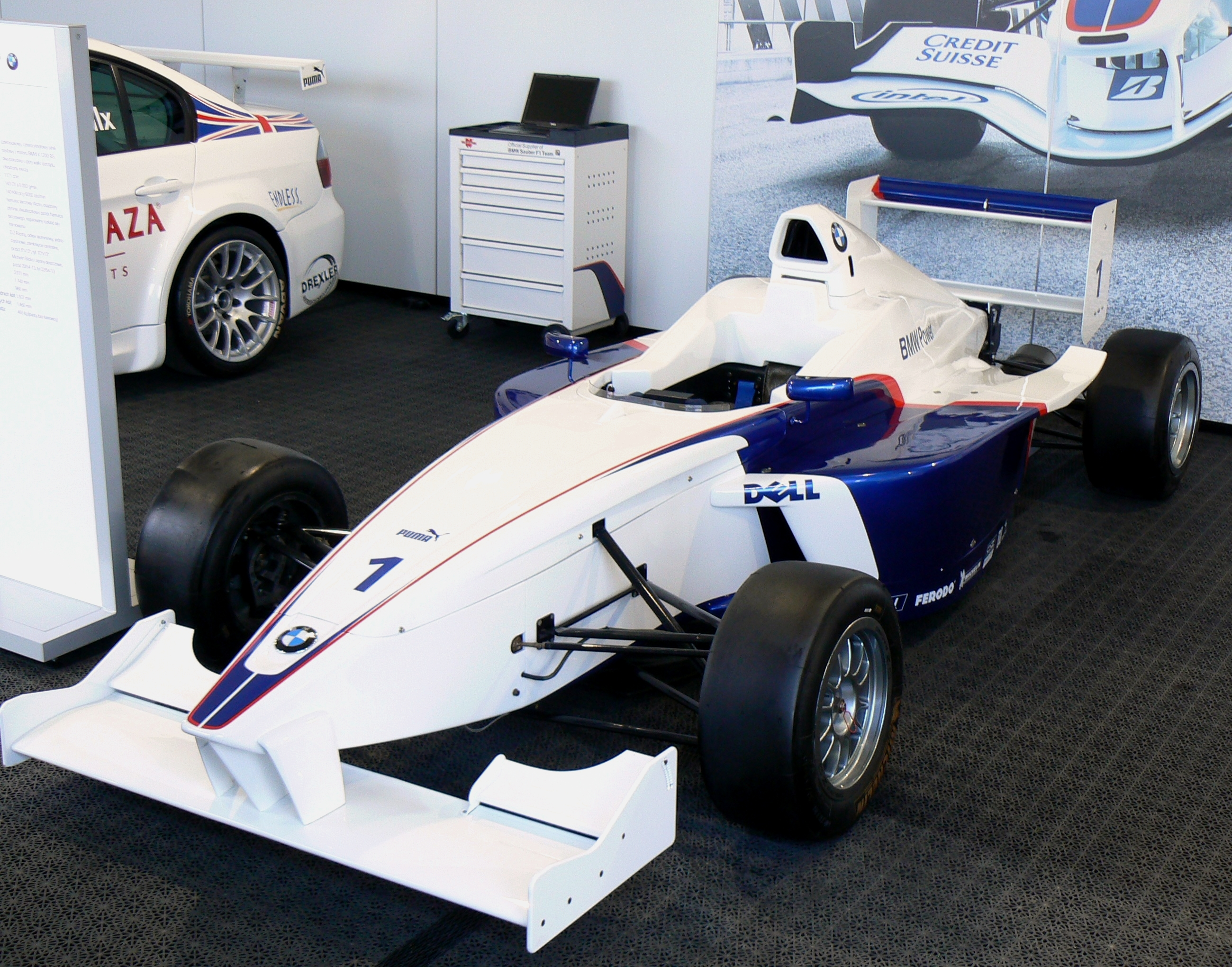
The Formula BMW FB02, built by Mygale

Formula BMW was what is sometimes referred to as a "slicks and wings" formula, which describes the use of slick tires and downforce-generating wings at the front and rear. The addition of wings results in cornering speeds that are faster than that which is achieved by the wingless Formula Ford cars and comparable to Formula Renault, and provides drivers with valuable first-time experience of the unique characteristics of aerodynamic downforce.

Formula BMW was strictly a "control" formula. This term describes a formula in which every major aspect of equipment and suppliers is restricted. Control formulae normally have only one chassis specification, one engine, and single suppliers of tires and fuel. Modifications to the chassis, bodywork and engine are not permitted and this is strictly enforced through scrutineering. In the case of Formula BMW, tuning is restricted to basic adjustment of the gear ratios, suspension, brake balance, and wing angles. The engines are sealed to prevent illegal modifications and are serviced by Schnitzer Motorsport.

DesignworksUSA, a subsidiary of BMW, led the design of the car in cooperation with the French chassis constructor Mygale, which was responsible for production. The result, designated "FB02", was a compact design, with a carbon-fibre composite tub constructed to the safety standards of the Fédération Internationale de l'Automobile (motorsport's world governing body). The bodywork is made from a kevlar composite. At 3.975 m (13.041 ft) in length, it was larger than a Formula Ford 1600, and slightly smaller than a Formula Renault 2000.

The engine was sourced from BMW's motorcycle division: it is a near-standard K1200RS motorcycle engine, in an inline four-cylinder configuration, with a capacity of 1171 cc, and a power output of 140 hp (100 kW). Drive is through a single-plate clutch and a six-speed sequential gearbox, produced by Hewland. The complete car weighs 455 kg without fuel and driver.
