= 2009 Formula Renault 2.0 Northern European Cup =

Motor racing championship

2009 Formula Renault 2.0 NEC

Seasons
- ← 2008 2010 →

The 2009 Formula Renault 2.0 Northern European Cup was the fourth Formula Renault 2.0 Northern European Cup season. The season began at Zandvoort on 12 April and finished on 4 October at Spa, after sixteen races.

Motopark Academy driver António Félix da Costa won the NEC championship title, having won nine races during the season, bringing the team their fourth successive drivers' championship title. His team-mates, Danish drivers Kevin Magnussen and Marco Sørensen, completed the top three, for the team's third consecutive championship title.

== Drivers and teams ==
2009 Entry List
Team	No.	Driver name	Rounds
(Germany) Motopark Academy	3	(Brazil) Luís Felipe Derani	All
(Germany) Motopark Academy	4	(Netherlands) Bart Hylkema	All
(Germany) Motopark Academy	5	(Sweden) Jimmy Eriksson	All
(Germany) Motopark Academy	6	(Portugal) António Félix da Costa	1–2, 4–8
(Germany) Motopark Academy	7	(Denmark) Marco Sørensen	1–2, 4–8
(Germany) Motopark Academy	8	(Colombia) Juan Jacobo	1–2
(Germany) Motopark Academy	9	(United Kingdom) Adrian Quaife-Hobbs	1–2, 4–8
(Germany) Motopark Academy	10	(Denmark) Kevin Magnussen	1–2, 4–8
(Germany) Motopark Academy	48	(Poland) Kuba Giermaziak	4–8
(Finland) Koiranen bros.	11	(Finland) Jukka Honkavuori	3
(Finland) Koiranen bros.	16	(Finland) Daniel Aho	All
(Finland) Koiranen bros.	17	(Finland) Toomas Heikkinen	All
(Finland) Koiranen bros.	18	(Finland) Jesse Laine	All
(Germany) Jedi-Racing Team	12	(Germany) Julian Eisenreich	All
(Germany) Brinkmann	14	(Germany) Dominik Brinkmann	1–2, 4
(Netherlands) Van Amersfoort Racing	19	(Netherlands) Mathijs Harkema	1–2, 4–6, 8
(Estonia) TT Racing	20	(Estonia) Kevin Korjus	All
(Estonia) TT Racing	21	(Estonia) Karl-Oscar Liiv	1–5
(Netherlands) MP Motorsport	21	(Estonia) Karl-Oscar Liiv	6–8
(Netherlands) MP Motorsport	30	(Netherlands) Nigel Melker	1–2, 4
(Netherlands) MP Motorsport	31	(Netherlands) Daniël de Jong	1–2, 4–8
(Finland) Red Step Formula	22	(Finland) Henri Karjalainen	3
(Finland) Red Step Formula	23	(Estonia) Johannes Moor	3
(Denmark) KEO Racing	25	(United States) Robert Siska	2, 4, 7
(Denmark) KEO Racing	26	(Denmark) Daniel Schilling	2, 7
(Germany) SL Formula	27	(South Africa) Arnold Neveling	1–4
(Germany) SL Formula	28	(Austria) Daniel Schellnegger	2
(Czech Republic) Krenek Motorsport	32	(Czech Republic) Jakub Knoll	1, 6–7
(Czech Republic) Krenek Motorsport	33	(Czech Republic) Adam Kout	4, 6
(Czech Republic) Krenek Motorsport	34	(Angola) Luís Sá Silva	1–7
(Czech Republic) Krenek Motorsport	41	(Czech Republic) Jakub Klášterka	6
(United Kingdom) CRS Racing	36	(United Kingdom) Harry Tincknell	4
(Finland) Kulmanen	38	(Finland) Kalle Kulmanen	3
(Germany) Boller	40	(Germany) Kai Boller	6
(Austria) Ledermair	43	(Austria) Johann Ledermair	6–8
(Estonia) Scuderia Nordica	45	(Estonia) Tõnis Vanaselja	3
(Estonia) Scuderia Nordica	46	(Estonia) Antti Rammo	3
(Czech Republic) Palmi Motorsport	72	(Czech Republic) Jakub Horak	6
(Czech Republic) Palmi Motorsport	73	(Czech Republic) David Palmi	6

== Race calendar and results ==
Round		Circuit	Date	Pole position	Fastest lap	Winning driver	Winning team	Event
1	R1	(Netherlands) Circuit Park Zandvoort	12 April	(United Kingdom) Adrian Quaife-Hobbs	(Portugal) António Félix da Costa	(United Kingdom) Adrian Quaife-Hobbs	(Germany) Motopark Academy	Easter Races
1	R2	(Netherlands) Circuit Park Zandvoort	13 April		(United Kingdom) Adrian Quaife-Hobbs	(Portugal) António Félix da Costa	(Germany) Motopark Academy	Easter Races
2	R1	(Germany) Hockenheimring	25 April	(Denmark) Kevin Magnussen	(Denmark) Kevin Magnussen	(Portugal) António Félix da Costa	(Germany) Motopark Academy	Hockenheim Historic
2	R2	(Germany) Hockenheimring	26 April		(Denmark) Marco Sørensen	(Colombia) Juan Jacobo	(Germany) Motopark Academy	Hockenheim Historic
3	R1	(Finland) Alastaro Circuit	13 June	(Sweden) Jimmy Eriksson	(Sweden) Jimmy Eriksson	(Sweden) Jimmy Eriksson	(Germany) Motopark Academy	Formula Renault 2.0 Finland
3	R2	(Finland) Alastaro Circuit	14 June		(Brazil) Luís Felipe Derani	(Finland) Daniel Aho	(Finland) Koiranen bros.	Formula Renault 2.0 Finland
4	R1	(Germany) Motorsport Arena Oschersleben	20 June	(Portugal) António Félix da Costa	(Portugal) António Félix da Costa	(Portugal) António Félix da Costa	(Germany) Motopark Academy	FIA GT Oschersleben 2 Hours
4	R2	(Germany) Motorsport Arena Oschersleben	21 June		(Portugal) António Félix da Costa	(Portugal) António Félix da Costa	(Germany) Motopark Academy	FIA GT Oschersleben 2 Hours
5	R1	(Netherlands) TT Circuit Assen	8 August	(Portugal) António Félix da Costa	(Portugal) António Félix da Costa	(Portugal) António Félix da Costa	(Germany) Motopark Academy	Rizla Racing Day
5	R2	(Netherlands) TT Circuit Assen	9 August		(Portugal) António Félix da Costa	(Portugal) António Félix da Costa	(Germany) Motopark Academy	Rizla Racing Day
6	R1	(Czech Republic) Autodrom Most	29 August	(Czech Republic) Adam Kout	(United Kingdom) Adrian Quaife-Hobbs	(Czech Republic) Adam Kout	(Czech Republic) Krenek Motorsport	Truck GP
6	R2	(Czech Republic) Autodrom Most	30 August		(Portugal) António Félix da Costa	(Portugal) António Félix da Costa	(Germany) Motopark Academy	Truck GP
7	R1	(Germany) Nürburgring	19 September	(Denmark) Kevin Magnussen	(Denmark) Kevin Magnussen	(Denmark) Kevin Magnussen	(Germany) Motopark Academy	World Series by Renault
7	R2	(Germany) Nürburgring	20 September		(Portugal) António Félix da Costa	(Portugal) António Félix da Costa	(Germany) Motopark Academy	World Series by Renault
8	R1	(Belgium) Circuit de Spa-Francorchamps	3 October	(Portugal) António Félix da Costa	(Portugal) António Félix da Costa	(Portugal) António Félix da Costa	(Germany) Motopark Academy	Spa Racing Festival
8	R2	(Belgium) Circuit de Spa-Francorchamps	4 October		(Denmark) Kevin Magnussen	(Denmark) Marco Sørensen	(Germany) Motopark Academy	Spa Racing Festival

== Standings ==
- Points system: 30, 24, 20, 17, 16, 15, 14, 13, 12, 11, 10, 9, 8, 7, 6, 5, 4, 3, 2, 1 for 20th. Only the best 14 results counted towards the final standings.

Pos	Driver	ZAN (Netherlands)		HOC (Germany)		ALA (Finland)		OSC (Germany)		ASS (Netherlands)		MST (Czech Republic)		NÜR (Germany)		SPA (Belgium)		Points
Pos	Driver	1	2	3	4	5	6	7	8	9	10	11	12	13	14	15	16	Points
1	(Portugal) António Félix da Costa	2	1	1	6			1	1	1	1	8	1	6	1	1	2	361
2	(Denmark) Kevin Magnussen	3	2	3	Ret			2	3	3	3	3	3	1	5	2	3	278
3	(Denmark) Marco Sørensen	6	3	4	4			7	2	2	6	7	2	19	Ret	5	1	232
4	(United Kingdom) Adrian Quaife-Hobbs	1	17	2	15			3	10	5	5	5	7	7	2	4	4	229
5	(Estonia) Kevin Korjus	11	8	9	8	4	6	6	9	9	7	2	Ret	8	6	9	7	201
6	(Finland) Daniel Aho	16	9	7	2	5	1	9	6	9	4	Ret	14	10	14	14	8	198
7	(Brazil) Luís Felipe Derani	Ret	14	5	Ret	6	2	13	12	6	2	6	4	4	Ret	8	9	192
8	(Finland) Toomas Heikkinen	8	4	12	7	Ret	10	10	20	12	14	4	5	5	4	6	6	187
9	(Netherlands) Daniël de Jong	7	6	10	18			8	Ret	7	10	Ret	8	3	7	3	5	164
10	(Netherlands) Bart Hylkema	10	5	19	10	2	7	21	14	Ret	11	9	9	9	3	12	Ret	160
11	(Germany) Julian Eisenreich	13	10	21	13	Ret	11	16	7	11	16	11	10	14	9	7	Ret	125
12	(Finland) Jesse Laine	12	12	Ret	11	8	3	Ret	16	14	15	Ret	15	13	11	11	11	123
13	(South Africa) Arnold Neveling	9	7	8	3	3	5	12	8									117
14	(Poland) Kuba Giermaziak							4	4	4	8	12	11	2	Ret	13	Ret	115
15	(Sweden) Jimmy Eriksson	Ret	18	11	17	1	13	15	19	10	13	Ret	18	12	16	16	12	113
16	(Estonia) Karl-Oscar Liiv	Ret	15	15	Ret	10	9	19	15	13	12	Ret	Ret	11	8	10	10	113
17	(Netherlands) Mathijs Harkema	15	Ret	14	9			14	11	Ret	9	10	12			Ret	13	82
18	(Netherlands) Nigel Melker	5	16	13	5			5	5									77
19	(Colombia) Juan Jacobo	4	11	6	1													72
20	(Czech Republic) Adam Kout							11	13			1	6					63
21	(Angola) Luís Sá Silva	17	Ret	18	14	Ret	16	Ret	18	15	Ret	Ret	Ret	16	10			44
22	(Austria) Johann Ledermair											13	13	15	12	15	14	44
23	(Finland) Henri Karjalainen					7	4											31
24	(Finland) Jukka Honkavuori					11	8											23
25	(Estonia) Antti Rammo					9	12											21
26	(Czech Republic) Jakub Knoll	14	13									18	19	DNS	DNS			20
27	(Germany) Dominik Brinkmann	DNS	Ret	16	12			18	21									17
28	(United States) Robert Siska			20	16			20	22					18	15			16
29	(Finland) Kalle Kulmanen					13	15											14
30	(Estonia) Tõnis Vanaselja					12	17											13
31	(Denmark) Daniel Schilling													17	13			12
32	(Czech Republic) Jakub Horak											15	16					11
33	(Czech Republic) David Palmi											16	17					9
34	(United Kingdom) Harry Tincknell							17	17									8
35	(Czech Republic) Jakub Klášterka											14	20					8
36	(Estonia) Johannes Moor					Ret	14											7
37	(Austria) Daniel Schellnegger			17	Ret													4
38	(Germany) Kai Boller											17	21					4
Pos	Driver	ZAN (Netherlands)		HOC (Germany)		ALA (Finland)		OSC (Germany)		ASS (Netherlands)		MST (Czech Republic)		NÜR (Germany)		SPA (Belgium)		Points
