= Marco Sørensen =

Danish racing driver

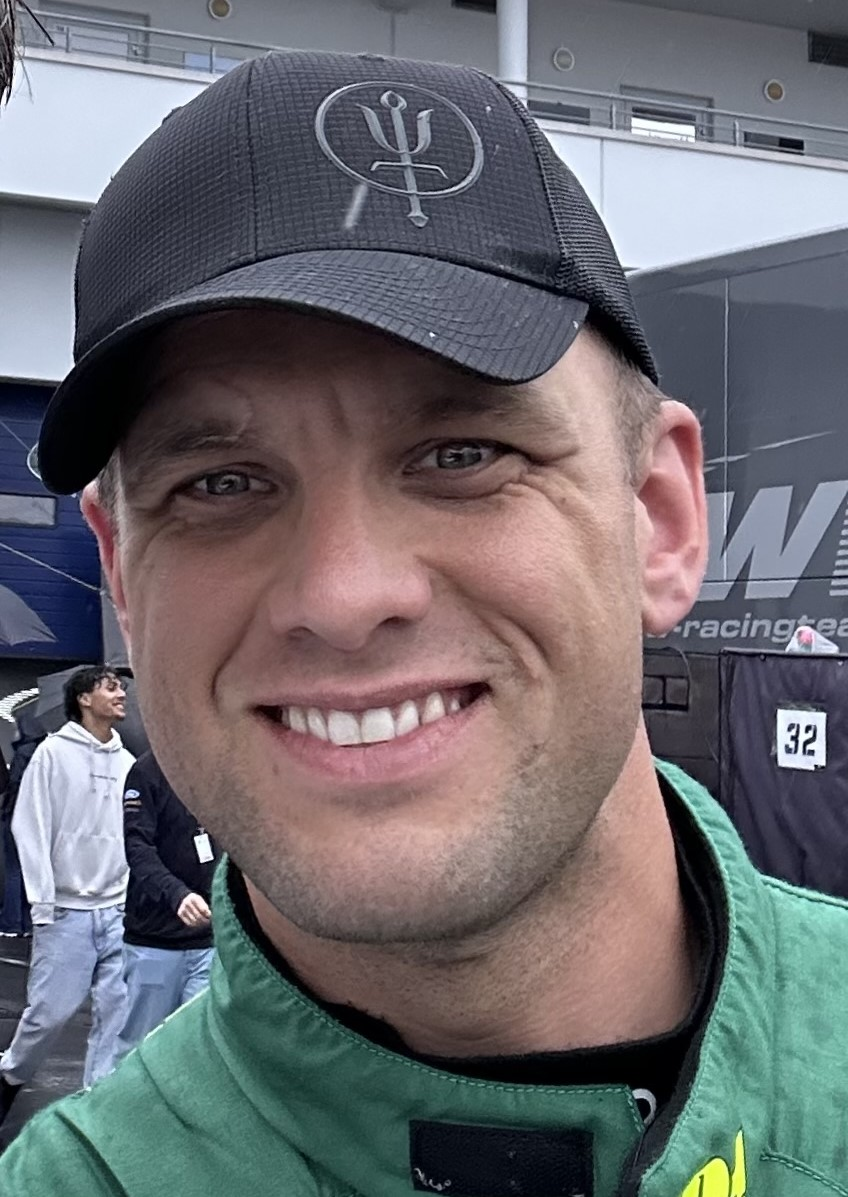
- Sørensen in 2024
- Nationality: (Denmark) Danish
- Born: Marco Lorentz Sørensen; 6 September 1990 (age 36)
- Relatives: Lasse Sørensen (brother)

FIA World Endurance Championship career
- Debut season: 2015
- Current team: Aston Martin THOR Team
- Categorisation: FIA Gold (until 2018); FIA Platinum (2019–)
- Car number: 009
- Former teams: High Class Racing, TF Sport, Aston Martin Racing, D'station Racing
- Starts: 72
- Wins: 9
- Podiums: 14
- Poles: 14
- Best finish: 1st in 2016, 2019-20, 2022

Previous series
- 2014-15 2012-14 2010–11 2009 2009 2008 2008 2008 2007 2007 2006–07: GP2 Series; Formula Renault 3.5 Series; German Formula Three; Formula Renault 2.0 NEC; Eurocup Formula Renault 2.0; British Formula Ford; ADAC Formel Masters; FR2.0 Portugal Winter Series; Formula Ford NEZ; Formula Ford Sweden; Formula Ford Denmark

Marco Lorentz Sørensen (born 6 September 1990) is a Danish racing driver and Aston Martin factory driver who is currently compete in the FIA World Endurance Championship for Aston Martin THOR Team. He won the World Endurance Championship in the LMGTE Pro class in the 2016 and 2019–20 seasons, and in the LMGTE Am class in 2022. He has also previously competed in the Formula Renault 3.5 Series and the GP2 Series, and is a former member of the Renault and Lotus F1 junior teams. His younger brother, Lasse, is also a racing driver who last competed in the NASCAR Whelen Euro Series.

== Career ==
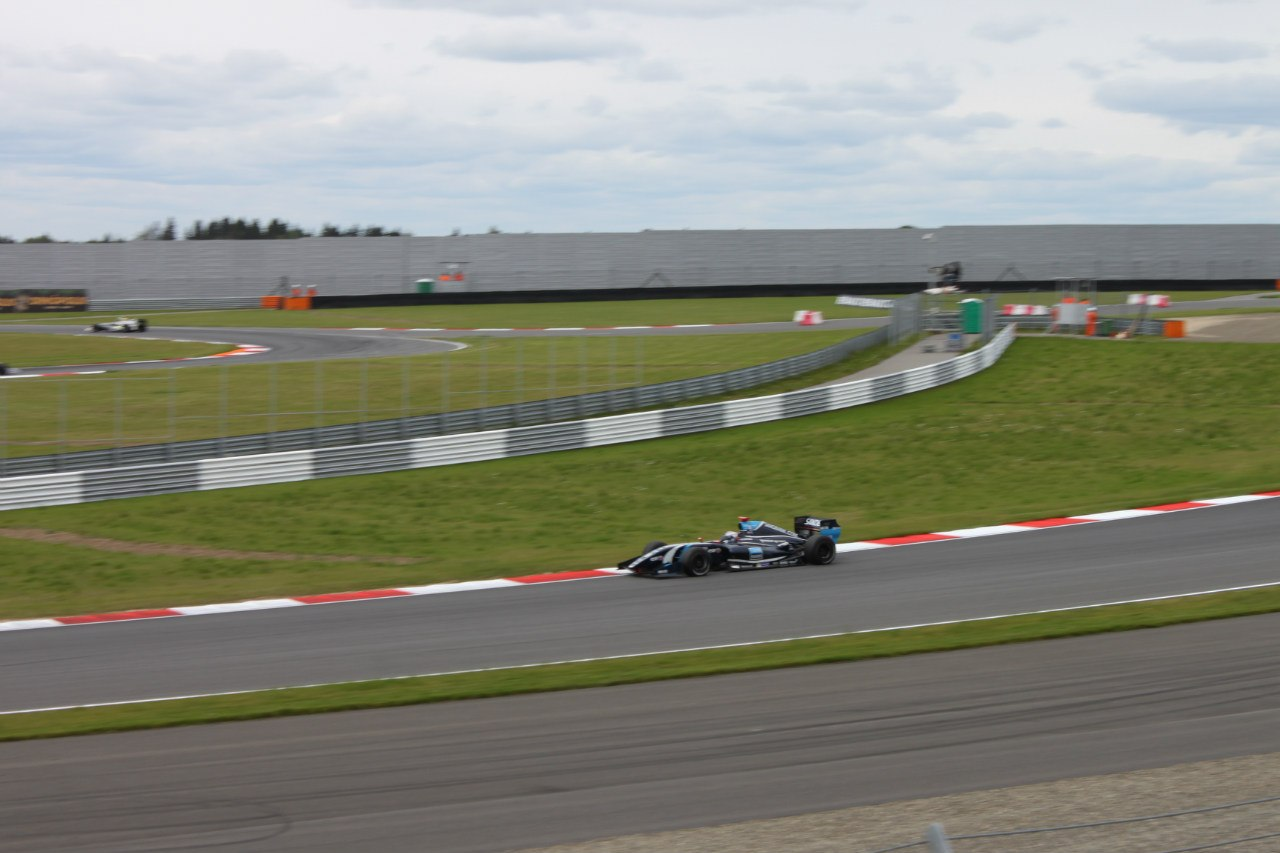
Sørensen during Race 1 of the 2014 Formula Renault 3.5 Series season at Moscow Raceway.

Sørensen made his debut in karting back in 1994 and had his first real race in 1998. He began Formula racing in 2006 with Formula Ford Denmark. In 2008, he was able to place fourth in the ADAC Formel Masters despite only completing half of the season.

Sørensen was taken under Renault's wing and became a part of the 2009 Renault Driver Development Programme with Davide Valsecchi and Charles Pic. That made him able to move up to Formula Renault in 2009 with Formula Renault 2.0 Northern European Cup and the Eurocup. Later that year, the programme was shut down because of financial problems which set Sørensen's career back.

In the middle of 2010, Sørensen was able to secure a drive in the German Formula Three series, with Brandl Motorsport. He continued in 2011 and finished runner-up in the series after a tough battle with eventual champion Richie Stanaway. He also had one-off entry at Silverstone in 2011 Formula 3 Euro Series with Mücke Motorsport, winning the reverse-grid race.

Sørensen had no plans for 2012 until Lotus called him and offered a test in the Formula Renault 3.5, in which he impressed sufficiently to be offered a seat alongside former title rival Stanaway at the team.

Søresnen took his first win in the Formula Renault 3.5 Series at the first race at Spa, having already retired from a commanding position due technical problems in the second race at Aragon. Another potential win slipped from Sørensen's grasp at the second race at Silverstone, suffering a puncture whilst leading comfortably on the final lap. After two more second-place finishes, he finished the season in joint fifth position with Nick Yelloly. Sørensen had another disaster season with engine problems in 2013 Formula Renault 3.5, but managed to take pole and victory in both races at Red Bull Ring.

=== GP2 Series ===
In 2014, Sørensen switched to GP2, replacing Tio Ellinas at MP Motorsport for the races at Silverstone and beyond. That same year, he took his first GP2 win in Sochi.

Sørensen switched to Carlin, replacing the Sauber-bound Felipe Nasr, for the 2015 season, his first full season in GP2.

=== Formula One ===
In September 2013, Sørensen undertook a tyre test at Circuit Paul Ricard with the Lotus F1 team and has become one of Lotus's test drivers.

=== FIA World Endurance Championship ===
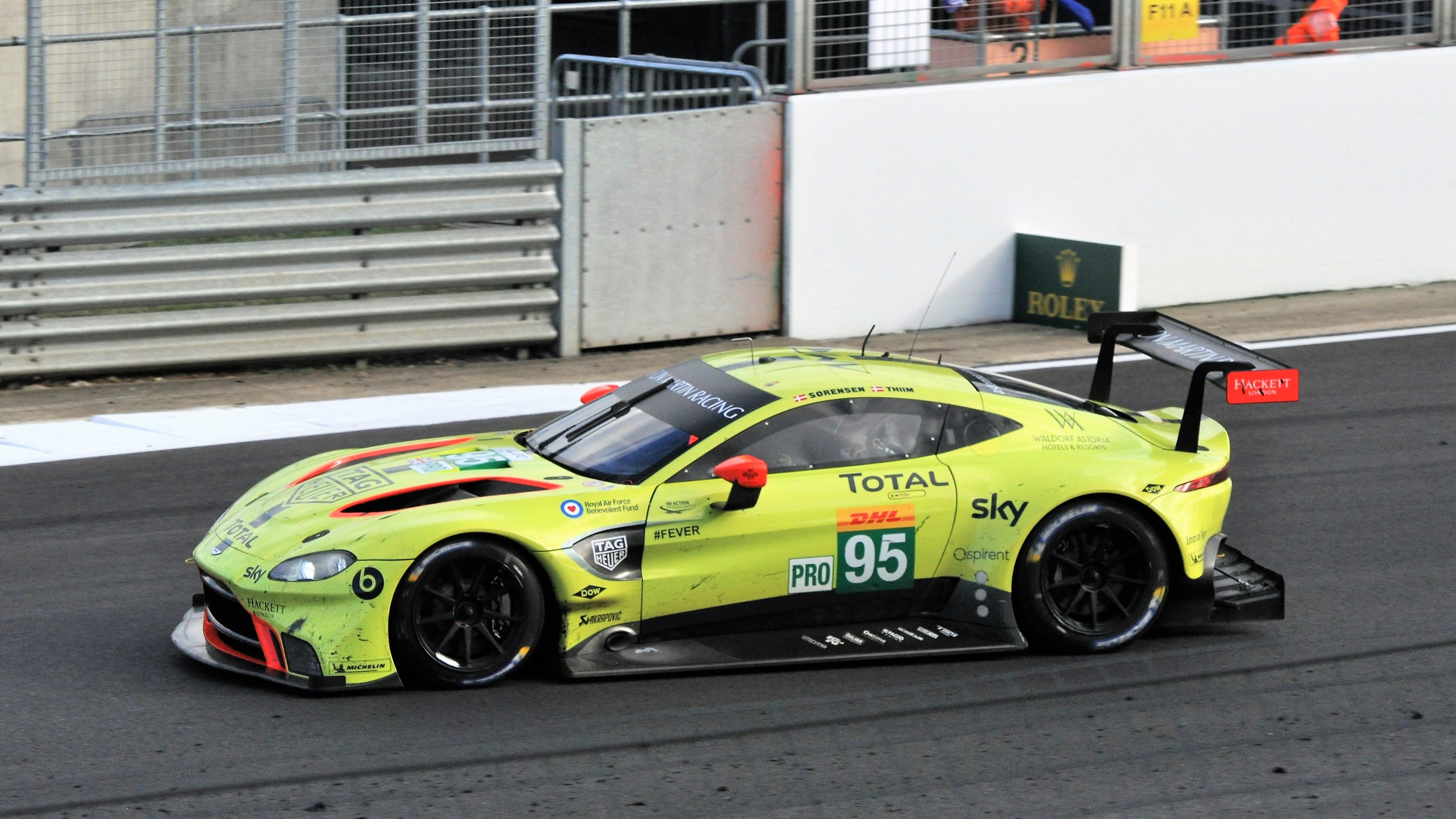
Sørensen racing in the 2018 6 Hours of Silverstone.

In 2015, Sørensen joined Aston Martin Racing alongside Nicki Thiim and Christoffer Nygaard. He also became a full-time factory driver for Aston Martin. He continued with Nicki Thiim after 2015 where Aston Martin Racing cut one of their GTE Pro cars out of the series. Sørensen took his first endurance win in Austin with Thiim in 2016, and the pair would go on to win the GT Championship. As the No. 95 entry has mostly been driven by Sørensen and Thiim, it has come to be known as the Dane Train.

On 19 January 2022, TF Sport announced that Sørensen would make a full-season return to the World Endurance championship in 2022, piloting the No. 33 Aston Martin Vantage AMR alongside Ben Keating and Florian Latorre.

Although Sørensen didn't return to the series in 2023, he would still be present on the grid at Le Mans. Sørensen joined GMB Motorsport's GTE Am class entry for the 2023 24 Hours of Le Mans, competing alongside Jens Reno Møller and Gustav Birch.

== Racing record ==
=== Career summary ===
Season	Series	Team	Races	Wins	Poles	F/Laps	Podiums	Points	Position
2007	Danish Formula Ford Championship	Lucas Racing	16	4	7	16	12	238	**3rd**
2008	ADAC Formel Masters	ma-con Motorsport	8	4	5	3	6	125	4th
2008	British Formula Ford Championship	Fluid Motorsport Development	22	1	0	3	5	327	8th
2008	Formula Renault 2.0 Portugal Winter Series	Motopark Academy	2	0	0	0	1	12	11th
2009	Eurocup Formula Renault 2.0	Motopark Academy	14	0	0	0	0	15	15th
2009	Formula Renault 2.0 NEC	Motopark Academy	14	1	0	1	4	232	**3rd**
2010	German Formula 3 Championship	Brandl Motorsport	8	0	1	0	1	18	11th
2011	German Formula 3 Championship	Brandl Motorsport	16	2	2	2	15	126	**2nd**
2011	Formula 3 Euro Series	Mücke Motorsport	3	1	1	1	1	0	NC†
2012	Formula Renault 3.5 Series	Lotus	17	1	0	0	3	122	6th
2013	Formula Renault 3.5 Series	Lotus	17	2	2	1	3	113	7th
2014	Formula Renault 3.5 Series	Tech 1 Racing	17	0	0	0	1	44	12th
2014	GP2 Series	MP Motorsport	14	1	0	0	1	47	11th
2015	GP2 Series	Carlin	8	0	0	0	0	0	33rd
2015	FIA World Endurance Championship - LMGTE Pro	Aston Martin Racing	7	0	1	0	0	81	8th
2015	24 Hours of Le Mans - LMGTE Pro	Aston Martin Racing	1	0	0	0	0	N/A	4th
2016	FIA World Endurance Championship - LMGTE Pro	Aston Martin Racing	9	2	3	0	6	156	**1st**
2016	24 Hours of Le Mans - LMGTE Pro	Aston Martin Racing	1	0	0	0	0	N/A	5th
2016	24 Hours of Nürburgring - SP9	Aston Martin Racing	1	0	0	0	0	N/A	DNF
2017	FIA World Endurance Championship - LMGTE Pro	Aston Martin Racing	9	1	1	0	1	104	6th
2017	24 Hours of Le Mans - LMGTE Pro	Aston Martin Racing	1	0	0	0	0	N/A	9th
2017	IMSA SportsCar Championship - GTD	Aston Martin Racing	1	0	0	0	0	19	69th
2018	British GT Championship	TF Sport AMR	9	1	0	4	2	98	6th
2018	24 Hours of Le Mans - LMGTE Pro	Aston Martin Racing	1	0	0	0	0	N/A	8th
2018	24 Hours of Nürburgring - SP9-LG	Aston Martin Racing	1	1	0	0	1	N/A	**1st**
2018–19	FIA World Endurance Championship - LMGTE Pro	Aston Martin Racing	8	1	2	0	1	65.5	9th
2019	British GT Championship	Beechdean AMR	5	0	0	0	1	33	18th
2019	24 Hours of Le Mans - LMGTE Pro	Aston Martin Racing	1	0	1	0	0	N/A	DNF
2019–20	FIA World Endurance Championship - LMGTE Pro	Aston Martin Racing	8	3	1	0	5	172	**1st**
2020	24 Hours of Le Mans - LMGTE Pro	Aston Martin Racing	1	0	0	0	1	N/A	**3rd**
2021	FIA World Endurance Championship - LMP2	High Class Racing	1	0	0	0	0	8	24th
2021	24 Hours of Le Mans - LMGTE Pro	High Class Racing	1	0	0	0	1	N/A	13th
2021	British GT Championship	TF Sport	1	0	0	0	0	0	NC†
2021	GT World Challenge Europe Endurance Cup	Garage 59 AMR	1	0	0	0	1	22	13th
2022	FIA World Endurance Championship - LMGTE Am	TF Sport	6	2	3	0	4	141	**1st**
2022	24 Hours of Le Mans - LMGTE Am	TF Sport	1	1	0	0	1	N/A	**1st**
2022	IMSA SportsCar Championship - GTD Pro	Corvette Racing	1	0	0	0	0	234	35th
2022	European Le Mans Series - LMGTE	Oman Racing with TF Sport	6	1	2	0	2	59	5th
2022	GT World Challenge Europe Endurance Cup	Beechdean AMR	3	0	0	0	0	6	30th
2022	24 Hours of Nürburgring - SP9	TF Sport AMR	1	0	0	0	0	N/A	DNF
2023	IMSA SportsCar Championship - GTD	Heart of Racing Team	11	2	3	1	3	3221	**2nd**
2023	24 Hours of Le Mans - LMGTE Am	GMB Motorsport	1	0	0	0	0	N/A	DNF
2024	FIA World Endurance Championship - LMGT3	D'station Racing	8	0	0	0	1	50	11th
2024	Super GT - GT300	D'station Racing	1	0	0	0	0	0	NC
2024	IMSA SportsCar Championship - GTD	Heart of Racing Team	1	0	0	0	0	99	74th
2024	IMSA SportsCar Championship - GTD Pro	Heart of Racing Team	1	0	0	0	0	303	33rd
2024	GT World Challenge Europe Endurance Cup	Comtoyou Racing	5	1	0	0	1	55	4th
2024-25	Asian Le Mans Series - GT	Earl Bamber Motorsport	2	0	0	0	0	0	25th
2025	FIA World Endurance Championship - Hypercar	Aston Martin THOR Team	8	0	0	0	0	19	22nd
2025	IMSA SportsCar Championship - GTD Pro	Heart of Racing Team	1	0	0	0	0	191	43rd
2025	IMSA SportsCar Championship - GTD	Magnus Racing	1	0	0	1	0	159	84th
2025	GT World Challenge Europe Endurance Cup	Comtoyou Racing	5	0	0	1	1	37	8th
2026	IMSA SportsCar Championship - GTP	Aston Martin THOR Team	1	0	0	0	0	231	32nd
2026	FIA World Endurance Championship - Hypercar	Aston Martin THOR Team	8	0	0	0	0	6	25th
2026	GT World Challenge Europe Endurance Cup	Comtoyou Racing	4	2	1	2	2	59	**2nd**
2026	FIA GT World Cup	Comtoyou Racing							
2026	IMSA SportsCar Championship - GTD Pro	Car Blanche	3	1	0	0	1	908	18th

^{†} As Sørensen was a guest driver, he was ineligible to score points.

=== Complete Eurocup Formula Renault 2.0 results ===
(key) (Races in bold indicate pole position; races in italics indicate fastest lap)

Year	Entrant	1	2	3	4	5	6	7	8	9	10	11	12	13	14	DC	Points
2009	Motopark Academy	CAT; 1; 14	CAT; 2 Ret	SPA; 1; 9	SPA; 2; 15	HUN; 1 DSQ	HUN; 2 DSQ	SIL; 1; 10	SIL; 2 Ret	LMS; 1; 20	LMS; 2; 12	NÜR; 1; 6	NÜR; 2; 8	ALC; 1; 18	ALC; 2; 8	15th	15

=== Complete Formula Renault 2.0 NEC results ===
(key) (Races in bold indicate pole position) (Races in italics indicate fastest lap)

Year	Entrant	1	2	3	4	5	6	7	8	9	10	11	12	13	14	15	16	DC	Points
2009	Motopark Academy	ZAN; 1; 6	ZAN; 2; 3	HOC; 1; 4	HOC; 2; 4	ALA; 1	ALA; 2	OSC; 1; 7	OSC; 2; 2	ASS; 1; 2	ASS; 2; 6	MST; 1; 7	MST; 2; 2	NÜR; 1; 19	NÜR; 2 Ret	SPA; 1; 5	SPA; 2; 1	3rd	232

=== Complete Formula Renault 3.5 Series results ===
(key) (Races in bold indicate pole position) (Races in italics indicate fastest lap)

Year	Team	1	2	3	4	5	6	7	8	9	10	11	12	13	14	15	16	17	Pos	Points
2012	Lotus	ALC; 1; 7	ALC; 2 Ret	MON; 1; 6	SPA; 1; 1	SPA; 2; 7	NÜR; 1; 6	NÜR; 2; 2	MSC; 1; 7	MSC; 2 Ret	SIL; 1 Ret	SIL; 2; 19†	HUN; 1; 8	HUN; 2; 2	LEC; 1; 5	LEC; 2; 5	CAT; 2; 10	CAT; 2 Ret	6th	122
2013	Lotus	MNZ; 1; 19	MNZ; 2; 18	ALC; 1; 9	ALC; 2; 10	MON; 1; 2	SPA; 1; 5	SPA; 2; 10	MSC; 1; 10	MSC; 2; 17	**RBR**; **1**; 1	**RBR**; **2**; 1	HUN; 1; 12	HUN; 2; 9	LEC; 1; 4	LEC; 2; 5	CAT; 1 Ret	CAT; 2; 7	7th	113
2014	Tech 1 Racing	MNZ; 1 Ret	MNZ; 2 Ret	ALC; 1; 15	ALC; 2; 7	MON; 1; 2	SPA; 1; 8	SPA; 2; 10	MSC; 1; 15	MSC; 2; 15	NÜR; 1; 10	NÜR; 2; 14	HUN; 1; 7	HUN; 2; 9	LEC; 1; 8	LEC; 2 Ret	JER; 1; 9	JER; 2 Ret	12th	44

=== Complete GP2 Series results ===
(key) (Races in bold indicate pole position) (Races in italics indicate fastest lap)

Year	Entrant	1	2	3	4	5	6	7	8	9	10	11	12	13	14	15	16	17	18	19	20	21	22	DC	Points
2014	MP Motorsport	BHR; FEA	BHR; SPR	CAT; FEA	CAT; SPR	MON; FEA	MON; SPR	RBR; FEA	RBR; SPR	SIL; FEA; 9	SIL; SPR; 8	HOC; FEA; 9	HOC; SPR; 4	HUN; FEA; 10	HUN; SPR; 10	SPA; FEA; 14	SPA; SPR; 11	MNZ; FEA; 7	MNZ; SPR; 4	SOC; FEA; 8	SOC; SPR; 1	YMC; FEA; Ret	YMC; SPR; 21	11th	47
2015	Carlin	BHR; FEA; Ret	BHR; SPR; 21	CAT; FEA; 19	CAT; SPR; 22	MON; FEA; Ret	MON; SPR; 20	RBR; FEA; 18	RBR; SPR; 16	SIL; FEA	SIL; SPR	HUN; FEA	HUN; SPR	SPA; FEA	SPA; SPR	MNZ; FEA	MNZ; SPR	SOC; FEA	SOC; SPR	BHR; FEA	BHR; SPR	YMC; FEA	YMC; SPR	33rd	0

=== Complete FIA World Endurance Championship results ===
Year	Entrant	Class	Car	Engine	1	2	3	4	5	6	7	8	9	Rank	Points
2015	Aston Martin Racing	LMGTE Pro	Aston Martin Vantage GTE	Aston Martin 4.5 L V8	**SIL**; 4	SPA; 6	LMS; 6	NÜR; 4	COA; 5	FUJ; 5	SHA	BHR; 4		8th	81
2016	Aston Martin Racing	LMGTE Pro	Aston Martin Vantage GTE	Aston Martin 4.5 L V8	SIL; 3	SPA; Ret	LMS; 2	**NÜR**; 3	**MEX**; 3	**COA**; 1	FUJ; 5	SHA; 4	BHR; 1	1st	156
2017	Aston Martin Racing	LMGTE Pro	Aston Martin Vantage GTE	Aston Martin 4.5 L V8	SIL; 6	SPA; 8	LMS; 5	NÜR; 4	MEX; 1	COA; 4	FUJ; 7	**SHA**; 5	BHR; 7	6th	104
2018–19	Aston Martin Racing	LMGTE Pro	Aston Martin Vantage AMR	Aston Martin 4.0 L Turbo V8	SPA; 7	LMS; 5	SIL; 17	**FUJ**; 6	SHA; 1	SEB; 9	SPA; 7	**LMS**; Ret		9th	65.5
2019–20	Aston Martin Racing	LMGTE Pro	Aston Martin Vantage AMR	Aston Martin 4.0 L Turbo V8	SIL; 5	FUJ; 1	SHA; 5	BHR; 1	**COA**; 1	SPA; 2	LMS; 3	BHR; 5		1st	172
2021	High Class Racing	LMP2	Oreca 07	Gibson GK428 4.2 L V8	SPA	ALG	MNZ	LMS; 8	BHR	BHR				24th	8
2022	TF Sport	LMGTE Am	Aston Martin Vantage AMR	Aston Martin 4.0 L Turbo V8	**SEB**; 2	**SPA**; 2	LMS; 1	MNZ; Ret	**FUJ**; 1	BHR; 4				1st	141
2024	D'station Racing	LMGT3	Aston Martin Vantage AMR GT3 Evo	Aston Martin 4.0 L Turbo V8	QAT; 3	IMO; 10	SPA; 7	LMS; 7	SÃO; 9	COA; Ret	FUJ; 7	BHR; 12		11th	50
2025	Aston Martin THOR Team	Hypercar	Aston Martin Valkyrie AMR-LMH	Aston Martin RA 6.5 L V12	QAT; 17	IMO; 17	SPA; 14	LMS; 11	SÃO; 13	COA; Ret	FUJ; 5	BHR; 7		22nd	19
2026	Aston Martin THOR Team	Hypercar	Aston Martin Valkyrie AMR-LMH	Aston Martin RA 6.5 L V12	IMO; 14	SPA; Ret	LMS; 13	SÃO; 9	COA; 14	FUJ; 9	CAT; 9	MNZ; 14		25th	6

=== Complete 24 Hours of Le Mans results ===
Year	Team	Co-Drivers	Car	Class	Laps	Pos.	Class Pos.
2015	(United Kingdom) Aston Martin Racing	(Denmark) Christoffer Nygaard (Denmark) Nicki Thiim	Aston Martin Vantage GTE	GTE; Pro	330	27th	4th
2016	(United Kingdom) Aston Martin Racing	(Denmark) Nicki Thiim (United Kingdom) Darren Turner	Aston Martin Vantage GTE	GTE; Pro	338	23rd	5th
2017	(United Kingdom) Aston Martin Racing	(Denmark) Nicki Thiim (New Zealand) Richie Stanaway	Aston Martin Vantage GTE	GTE; Pro	334	25th	9th
2018	(United Kingdom) Aston Martin Racing	(Denmark) Nicki Thiim (United Kingdom) Darren Turner	Aston Martin Vantage AMR	GTE; Pro	339	23rd	8th
2019	(United Kingdom) Aston Martin Racing	(Denmark) Nicki Thiim (United Kingdom) Darren Turner	Aston Martin Vantage AMR	GTE; Pro	132	DNF	DNF
2020	(United Kingdom) Aston Martin Racing	(Denmark) Nicki Thiim (United Kingdom) Richard Westbrook	Aston Martin Vantage AMR	GTE; Pro	343	22nd	**3rd**
2021	(Denmark) High Class Racing	(Denmark) Dennis Andersen (United States) Ricky Taylor	Oreca 07-Gibson	LMP2	353	18th	13th
2021	(Denmark) High Class Racing	(Denmark) Dennis Andersen (United States) Ricky Taylor	Oreca 07-Gibson	LMP2 Pro-Am	353	18th	4th
2022	(United Kingdom) TF Sport	(Portugal) Henrique Chaves (United States) Ben Keating	Aston Martin Vantage AMR	GTE; Am	343	34th	**1st**
2023	(Denmark) GMB Motorsport	(Denmark) Gustav Birch (Denmark) Jens Reno Møller	Aston Martin Vantage AMR	GTE; Am	21	DNF	DNF
2024	(Japan) D'station Racing	(France) Erwan Bastard (Japan) Satoshi Hoshino	Aston Martin Vantage AMR GT3 Evo	LMGT3	279	36th	9th
2025	(United States) Aston Martin THOR Team	(Canada) Roman De Angelis (Spain) Alex Riberas	Aston Martin Valkyrie AMR-LMH	Hypercar	383	12th	12th
2026	(United States) Aston Martin THOR Team	(Canada) Roman De Angelis (Spain) Alex Riberas	Aston Martin Valkyrie AMR	Hypercar	372	14th	14th

=== Complete IMSA SportsCar Championship results ===
(key) (Races in bold indicate pole position; results in italics indicate fastest lap)

Year	Team	Class	Make	Engine	1	2	3	4	5	6	7	8	9	10	11	12	Pos.	Points
2017	Aston Martin Racing	GTD	Aston Martin Vantage GT3	Aston Martin 6.0 V12	DAY; 12	SEB	LBH	COA	DET	WGL	MOS	LIM	ELK	VIR	LGA	PET	69th	19
2022	Corvette Racing	GTD Pro	Chevrolet Corvette C8.R GTD	Chevrolet 5.5 L V8	DAY; 10	SEB	LBH	LGA	WGL	MOS	LIM	ELK	VIR	PET			35th	234
2023	Heart of Racing Team	GTD	Aston Martin Vantage AMR GT3	Aston Martin 4.0 L Turbo V8	DAY; 1	SEB; 15	**LBH**; 2	LGA; 8	WGL; 6	**MOS**; 4	LIM; 1	ELK; 7	VIR; 12	IMS; 4	**PET**; 5		2nd	3221
2024	Heart of Racing Team	GTD	Aston Martin Vantage AMR GT3 Evo	Aston Martin M177 4.0 L Turbo V8	DAY; 22	SEB	LBH	LGA		WGL	MOS	ELK	VIR	IMS			74th	99
2024	Heart of Racing Team	GTD Pro	Aston Martin Vantage AMR GT3 Evo	Aston Martin M177 4.0 L Turbo V8					DET						PET; 4		33rd	303
2025	Heart of Racing Team	GTD Pro	Aston Martin Vantage AMR GT3 Evo	Aston Martin M177 4.0 L Turbo V8	DAY; 13	SEB		LGA	DET		MOS	ELK	VIR	IMS	PET		43rd	191
2025	Magnus Racing	GTD	Aston Martin Vantage AMR GT3 Evo	Aston Martin M177 4.0 L Turbo V8			LBH			WGL; 17							84th	159
2026	Aston Martin THOR Team	GTP	Aston Martin Valkyrie AMR-LMH	Aston Martin RA 6.5 L V12	DAY; 10	SEB	LBH	LGA	DET	WGL		ELK					32nd	231
2026	Car Blanche	GTD Pro	Aston Martin Vantage AMR GT3 Evo	Aston Martin M177 4.0 L Turbo V8							MOS		VIR; 4	IMS; 9	PET; 1		18th	908

=== Complete British GT Championship results ===
(key) (Races in bold indicate pole position) (Races in italics indicate fastest lap)

Year	Team	Car	Class	1	2	3	4	5	6	7	8	9	DC	Points
2018	TF Sport AMR	Aston Martin V12 Vantage GT3	GT3	OUL; 1; 9	OUL; 2; 2	ROC; 1; 7	SNE; 1; 6	SNE; 2; 1	SIL; 1; 5	SPA; 1; 7	BRH; 1; 6	DON; 1 Ret	6th	98
2019	Beechdean AMR	Aston Martin Vantage AMR GT3	GT3	OUL; 1; 9	OUL; 2; 3	SNE; 1; 10	SNE; 2; 11	SIL; 1; 5	DON; 1	SPA; 1	BRH; 1	DON; 1	18th	33
2021	TF Sport	Aston Martin Vantage AMR GT3	GT3	BRH; 1	SIL; 1; 7	DON; 1	SPA; 1	SNE; 1	SNE; 2	OUL; 1	OUL; 2	DON; 1	NC†	0†

^{†} As Sørensen was a guest driver, he was ineligible to score points.

=== Complete GT World Challenge Europe results ===
==== GT World Challenge Europe Endurance Cup ====
(key) (Races in bold indicate pole position) (Races in italics indicate fastest lap)

Year	Team	Car	Class	1	2	3	4	5	6	7	Pos.	Points
2021	Garage 59 AMR	Aston Martin Vantage AMR GT3	Pro	MNZ	LEC	SPA; 6H; 15	SPA; 12H; 3	SPA; 24H; 3	NÜR	CAT	13th	22
2022	Beechdean AMR	Aston Martin Vantage AMR GT3	Pro	IMO; 12	LEC; 13	SPA; 6H; 18	SPA; 12H; 5	SPA; 24H; 10	HOC	CAT	30th	6
2024	Comtoyou Racing	Aston Martin Vantage AMR GT3 Evo	Pro	LEC; 7	SPA; 6H; 1	SPA; 12H; 7	SPA; 24H; 1	NÜR; 6	MNZ; 24	JED; 10	4th	55
2025	Comtoyou Racing	Aston Martin Vantage AMR GT3 Evo	Pro	LEC; 5	MNZ; 3	SPA; 6H; 6	SPA; 12H; 62†	SPA; 24H; Ret	NÜR; 7	CAT; 34	8th	37
2026	Comtoyou Racing	Aston Martin Vantage AMR GT3 Evo	Pro	LEC; 1	MNZ; Ret	SPA; 6H; 11	SPA; 12H; 22	SPA; 24H; Ret	**NÜR**; 1	ALG	2nd	59

=== Complete European Le Mans Series results ===
(key) (Races in bold indicate pole position; results in italics indicate fastest lap)

Year	Entrant	Class	Chassis	Engine	1	2	3	4	5	6	Rank	Points
2022	Oman Racing with TF Sport	LMGTE	Aston Martin Vantage AMR	Aston Martin 4.0 L Turbo V8	LEC; Ret	**IMO**; 1	MNZ; 10	**CAT**; 10	SPA; 4	ALG; 2	5th	59

=== Complete Super GT results ===
(key) (Races in bold indicate pole position) (Races in italics indicate fastest lap)

Year	Team	Car	Class	1	2	3	4	5	6	7	8	DC	Points
2024	D'station Racing	Aston Martin Vantage AMR GT3 Evo	GT300	OKA; 19	FUJ	SUZ	FUJ	SUG	AUT	MOT	SUZ	NC	0

Sporting positions
Preceded by Richard Lietz	FIA World Endurance Cup for GT Drivers; 2016; With: Nicki Thiim	Succeeded by James Calado; Alessandro Pier Guidi (World Endurance GT Drivers' Championship)
Preceded by Michael Christensen; Kévin Estre	World Endurance GT Drivers' Championship; Champion; 2019-20; With: Nicki Thiim	Succeeded by James Calado; Alessandro Pier Guidi
Preceded by Emmanuel Collard; Nicklas Nielsen; François Perrodo	FIA Endurance Trophy for LMGTE Am Drivers; 2022; With: Ben Keating	Succeeded by Nicky Catsburg; Ben Keating; Nicolás Varrone
