= António Félix da Costa =

Portuguese racing driver (born 1991)

António Félix da Costa ComM
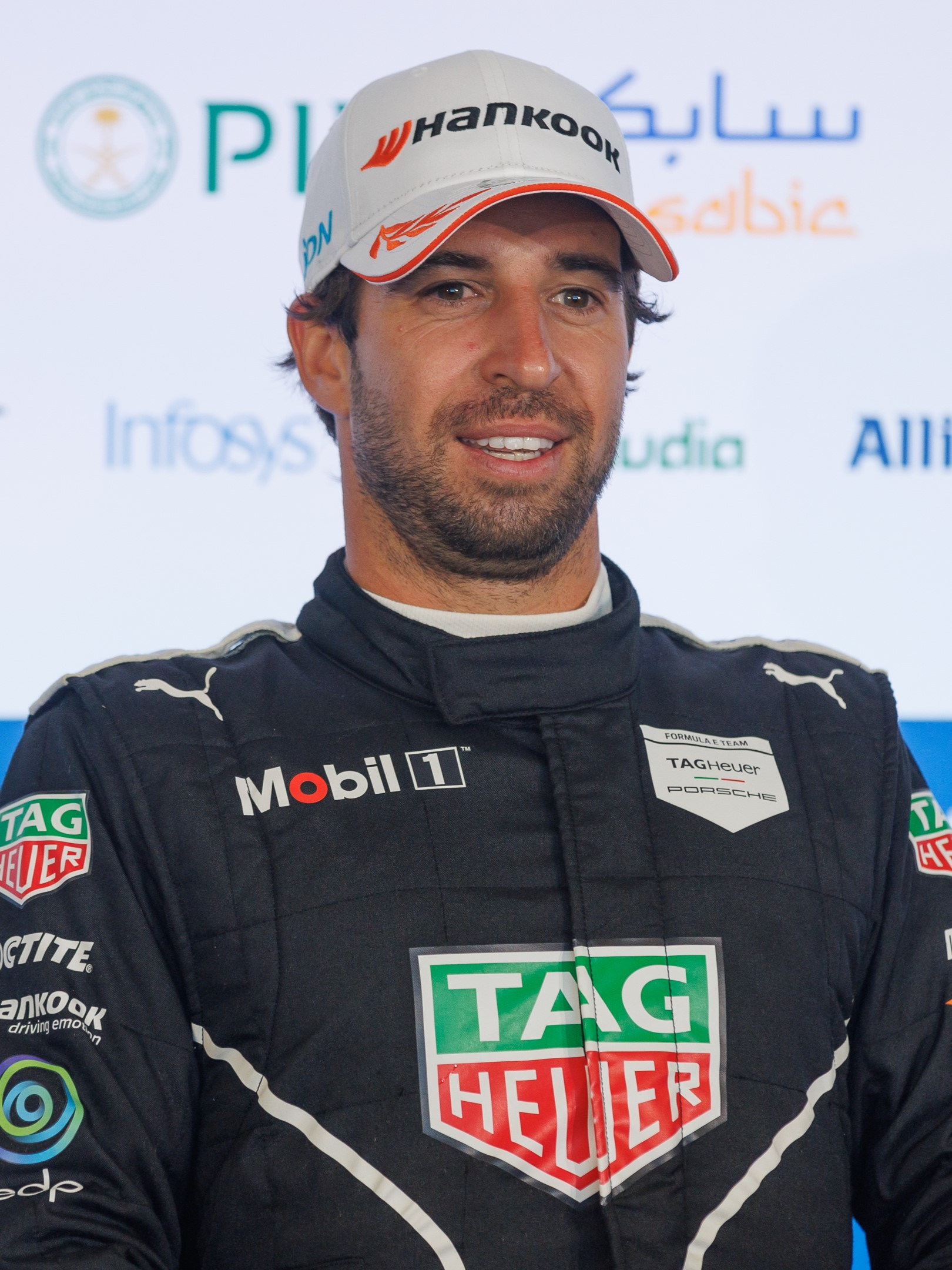
- Félix da Costa at the 2024 Berlin ePrix
- Born: António Maria de Mello Breyner Félix da Costa; 31 August 1991 (age 35); Cascais, Lisbon, Portugal
- Relatives: Duarte Félix da Costa (half-brother)
- Nationality: (Portugal) Portuguese

Formula E career
- Debut season: 2014–15
- Current team: Jaguar
- Categorisation: FIA Platinum
- Car number: 13
- Former teams: Aguri, Andretti, Techeetah, Porsche
- Starts: 152
- Championships: 1 (2019–20)
- Wins: 14
- Podiums: 30
- Poles: 8
- Fastest laps: 4
- Finished last season: 6th (128 pts)
- Statistics up to date as of 1 November 2026.

FIA World Endurance Championship career
- Debut season: 2018–19
- Current team: Alpine
- Car number: 35
- Former teams: MTEK, Jota
- Starts: 38
- Championships: 1 (2022)
- Wins: 3
- Podiums: 16
- Poles: 2
- Fastest laps: 4
- Best finish: 1st in 2022 (LMP2)
- Statistics up to date as of 1 January 2026.

24 Hours of Le Mans career
- Years: 2018–2023, 2025
- Teams: MTEK, Jota, AF Corse
- Best finish: 5th (2022)
- Class wins: 1 (2022)

Previous series
- 2017; 2017; 2014–2016; 2012–2013; 2010–2012; 2010; 2008–2009; 2008–2009; 2008: International GT Open; Blancpain GT Series; DTM; Formula Renault 3.5; GP3 Series; F3 Euro Series; Formula Renault Eurocup; Formula Renault NEC; FR2.0 UK Winter

Championship titles
- 2012, 2016; 2009: Macau Grand Prix; Formula Renault NEC

António Maria de Mello Breyner Félix da Costa (born 31 August 1991) is a Portuguese racing driver who competes in Formula E for Jaguar and in the FIA World Endurance Championship for Alpine. Félix da Costa won the 2019–20 Formula E Championship with Techeetah, and has won 14 ePrix since 2014. In endurance racing, Félix da Costa won an LMP2 title for Jota, and has competed in Hypercar since 2023.

A former Red Bull junior, Félix da Costa won the Macau Grand Prix in 2012 and 2016, and tested for Force India and Red Bull in Formula One. Félix da Costa made his Formula Renault 3.5 Series debut in mid-2012, and went on to win four of the last five races, before topping F1's Young Drivers' Test for Red Bull. He continued in the role for 2013, placing third in FR3.5.

Unable to secure an F1 drive, Félix da Costa joined the new Formula E for 2014. He spent five seasons across Aguri and Andretti, before moving to DS Techeetah to partner reigning two-time champion Jean-Éric Vergne. Félix da Costa beat Vergne and was crowned 2019–20 Formula E champion by 71 points. After Techeetah folded in 2022, Félix da Costa won five times for Porsche as Pascal Wehrlein's teammate. Félix da Costa moved to Jaguar in 2025.

Félix da Costa is also active in sports car racing. He was a BMW factory driver in DTM between 2014 and 2016, and in the WEC's LMGTE Pro class in 2018–19. Félix da Costa later spent three seasons in LMP2 with Jota, and won the title in 2022. He graduated to Hypercar in 2023, and then raced for Alpine in 2026 and Cadillac in 2027.

== Early career ==
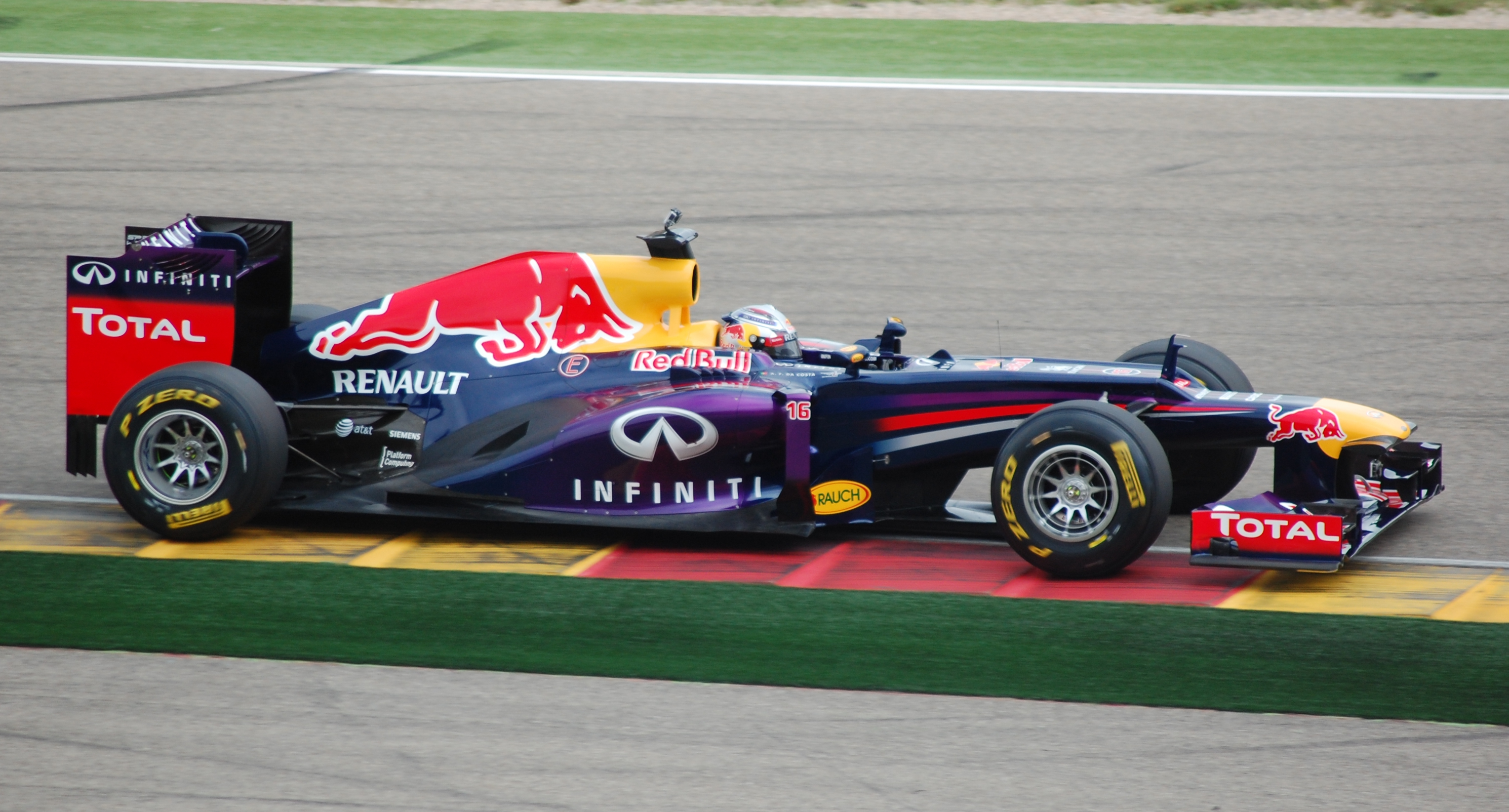
Félix da Costa in Motorland driving a Red Bull RB8

=== Karting ===
Born in Cascais, Félix da Costa began his karting career at the age of nine. In the Cadet class, Félix da Costa won the Portuguese Championship and the Portuguese Karting Open in 2002, before winning the South Portuguese Championship in 2003. In 2004, Félix da Costa stepped up to the ICA-J class, but he had to wait until 2006 to win his first title, the Portuguese Championship. 2006 was the year in which he also achieved strong results in European karting events, with a runner-up placing in the World Series Karting Championship and a third in the Italian Open Masters. In 2007, Félix da Costa became an official factory driver for the legendary Italian Tony Kart team, in the newly renamed KF2 category alongside Will Stevens. His best results were a fourth in the Asia-Pacific Championship and a runner-up in the South-Garda Winter Cup.

=== Formula Renault 2.0 ===
==== 2008 ====
Félix da Costa moved into single seaters in 2008, competing in both the Eurocup and Northern European championships of Formula Renault. Making his debut in the NEC at Hockenheim, he finished third behind team-mates Valtteri Bottas and Tobias Hegewald, after starting from third on the grid. Unlike his team-mates, his primary focus was the NEC rather than the Eurocup, and Félix da Costa achieved his first NEC win at Oschersleben, while most of his rivals were competing in the Eurocup round at the Hungaroring. He finished the season as runner-up in the championship, 86 points behind Bottas –who won twelve of the season's sixteen races – and as a prize, Félix da Costa tested a Formula Renault 3.5 Series car with the P1 Motorsport team at Paul Ricard. During the season, Félix da Costa also contested six Eurocup races; he recorded a best finish of fourth at Estoril en route to thirteenth in the championship, with five points-scoring finishes in total. Félix da Costa also served as a rookie driver for A1 Team Portugal, at the New Zealand and South African rounds of the 2008–09 A1 Grand Prix season.

==== 2009 ====
With Bottas, Hegewald, Daniel Ricciardo, Roberto Merhi amongst others moving to either Formula Two or Formula Three, Félix da Costa became a title contender in both the Eurocup and NEC Formula Renault series. Félix da Costa followed Bottas' lead of 2008, by dominating the NEC field, wrapping up the title at the Nürburgring. Consistency was the key to Félix da Costa's Eurocup campaign, finishing in the top five in the first seven races. He led the series until the rounds at the Nürburgring, where he ran under appeal, for a technical infringement in Super Pole. Félix da Costa dominated the first race at the brand new Ciudad del Motor de Aragón circuit, winning from his first series pole position, and also set fastest lap along the way. He completed the double the following day; however, he lost out on second place in the championship to Jean-Éric Vergne on a tie-breaker.

=== Formula Three ===
==== 2010 ====
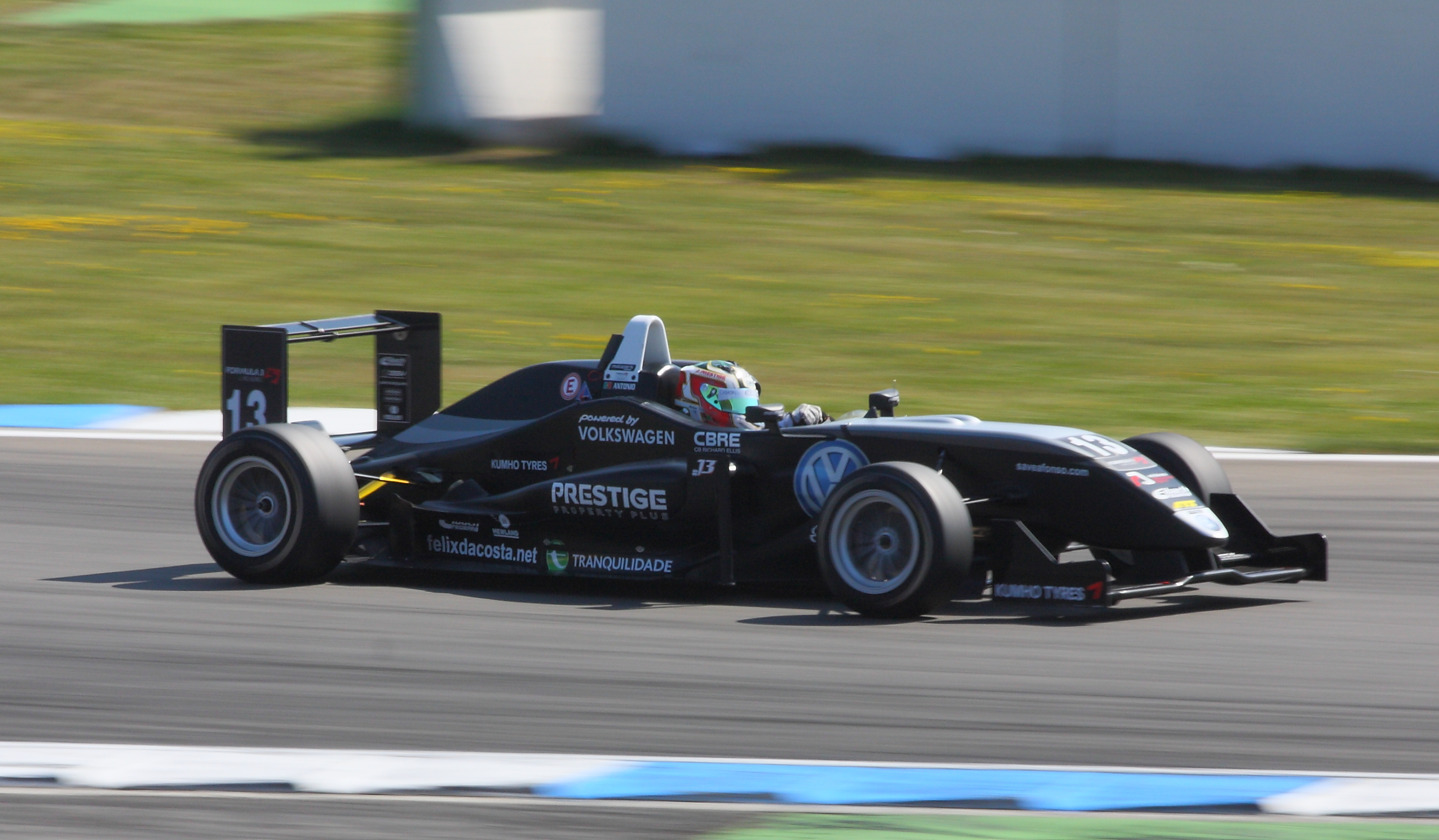
Félix da Costa made his Formula Three début in the 2010 Formula 3 Euro Series season.

Félix da Costa stepped up to the Formula 3 Euro Series for the 2010 season, moving up with Motopark Academy. Félix da Costa scored a point on his début at Le Castellet, giving him pole position for the second race via the series' reverse-grid system. He took further points-scoring finishes in the Saturday races at Hockenheim, Valencia, the Norisring and the Nürburgring. The following day at the Nürburgring, Félix da Costa became the first Portuguese driver to win a race in the series, after he passed pole-sitter Jim Pla at the start of the race. Félix da Costa followed this victory up with further victories at each of the following two meetings at Zandvoort and Brands Hatch; he had finished the Saturday races in eighth position, and thus started both meetings' Sunday races from pole position and led both from start to finish.

Félix da Costa achieved one further podium finish at Oschersleben, finishing third, en route to a final championship placing of seventh place and was the top-placed rookie. He also contested his first Macau Grand Prix at the end of the season, joining Carlin for the event. Having recorded the thirteenth fastest time in qualifying, Félix da Costa progressed up the field to a sixth-place finish in the main 15-lap race. Before the event, Félix da Costa took part in the Formula One Young Drivers' Test in Abu Dhabi for Force India. Félix da Costa set the third-fastest time of the first day's running, completing 77 laps.

==== 2011 ====
In order to return to the Macau Grand Prix in 2011, Félix da Costa contested two meetings of the British Formula Three Championship for Hitech Racing, replacing Max Snegirev in one of the team's cars. He contested races at the Nürburgring and Paul Ricard during July, at circuits he had competed at previously in the Formula 3 Euro Series. He achieved a podium finish in the final race at the Nürburgring, finishing second to Felipe Nasr after a last-lap pass on Carlos Huertas, while he accumulated two podium finishes – second in race one and third in race two – at Paul Ricard. He finished the championship in thirteenth place, tied on points with another of the team's drivers, Riki Christodoulou. He rejoined Hitech Racing for Macau, where he started from the front row for the qualifying race – after Roberto Merhi was given a post-qualifying penalty – but stalled on the grid at the race start, dropping to the back of the field before retiring with gearbox issues. He retired from the main race with a wheel issue.

==== 2012 ====
For the 2012 Macau Grand Prix, drivers had to compete in any Formula Three championship race during the calendar year, rather than an FIA-regulated championship meeting like previous years, due to the introduction of Dallara's new F312. As a result, Félix da Costa had to compete, for Carlin, in the MotorSport Vision Formula Three Cup – a second-tier Formula Three series in the United Kingdom – in its season-ending round at Snetterton, due to commitments in other series. Félix da Costa comfortably won both races, winning the first race by almost a minute and the second race by almost forty seconds. At Macau, Félix da Costa set the fastest time during the first qualifying session on Thursday, but ultimately had to start from second on the grid after Alex Lynn improved upon his time during the second session on Friday. Lynn made a slow start in the qualification race and Félix da Costa was momentarily passed by Felix Rosenqvist before he moved back ahead under braking for Lisboa on lap one. He maintained the lead until the end, taking pole position for the main race. Rosenqvist repeated his qualification race start in the Grand Prix itself, but Félix da Costa retook the lead at Lisboa on lap one once again. Félix da Costa maintained the lead until the end, to become the first Portuguese winner of the Grand Prix since Eduardo de Carvalho won the inaugural event in 1954. It was also Carlin's first win in the race since 2001, when Takuma Sato won the event.

=== GP3 Series ===
==== 2010 ====
Alongside his Formula Three commitments for Motopark Academy, Félix da Costa made his GP3 Series début during the series' inaugural season in 2010, replacing Lucas Foresti at the Carlin team for the rounds at the Hungaroring and Spa-Francorchamps. This was due to Foresti racing concurrently in the British Formula Three Championship, and the GP3 meetings clashed with Formula Three races at Spa-Francorchamps and Snetterton. In his first race, Félix da Costa finished in sixth place, but that was to be his only points-scoring finish, and eventually finished the season 26th in the drivers' championship standings.

==== 2011 ====
For 2011, Félix da Costa moved into the series on a full-time basis, signing for the Status Grand Prix team to partner former Formula Three rival Alexander Sims and Ivan Lukashevich. Félix da Costa scored points in both races at the season-opening event at Istanbul Park, where he recorded finishes of fifth place and fourth place respectively. After these finishes, Félix da Costa went on a run of nine races without a points finish, with ninth place at Silverstone being his best finish of the barren spell. This was ended by a sixth-place finish at the Hungaroring, scoring a point having started from eleventh on the grid. He failed to score at Spa-Francorchamps, before a seventh-place finish in the opening race at Monza, where he made his way up the order from fourteenth on the grid. Starting alongside Mitch Evans on the front row for the final race of the season, Félix da Costa held a top-three placing for most of the race and when Evans and James Calado collided with three laps remaining, Félix da Costa was to profit as he assumed the race lead. He held the lead until the end of the race, holding off Rio Haryanto by 0.7 seconds to take his first GP3 victory; the victory helped him to finish thirteenth in the final drivers' championship standings. Félix da Costa also contested the non-championship GP2 Final in Abu Dhabi for Ocean Racing Technology, taking finishes of seventh and thirteenth places respectively.

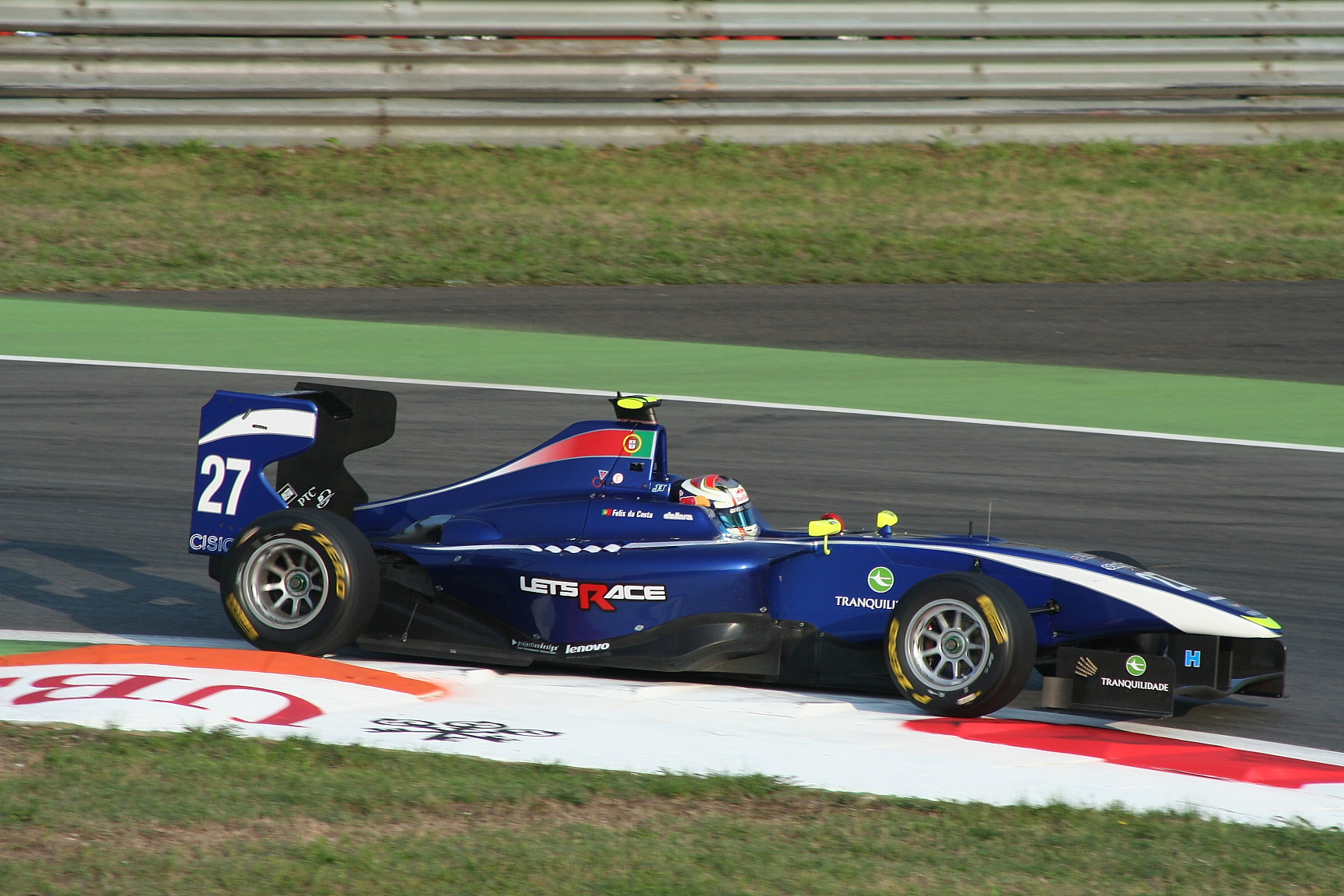
Da Costa competing at the Monza round of the 2012 GP3 Series.

==== 2012 ====
Félix da Costa remained in the series for 2012, and he rejoined the Carlin team, partnering British drivers Alex Brundle and William Buller. For the opening round of the season in Barcelona, Félix da Costa qualified on pole position by 0.01 seconds ahead of Lotus GP team-mates Conor Daly and Aaro Vainio. Félix da Costa jumped the start of the race, and was given a drive-through penalty as a result. He ultimately finished the race in fourteenth place, before taking a seventh-place finish in the weekend's other race. He finished seventh in the opening race at Monaco, meaning he started second for the second race of the weekend. He remained in that position during the race, following Marlon Stöckinger across the line for his first podium of the season.

Félix da Costa was excluded from qualifying at Valencia for a technical infringement, forcing him to start the first race from the back of the grid. He retired from the race on the second lap, after an incident with Dmitry Suranovich; he was later found guilty of causing an avoidable collision and was given a ten-place grid penalty for the second race, forcing him to start at the back once again. Over the course of the 14-lap race, Félix da Costa moved up from 24th to 8th, setting fastest lap of the race in the process. He qualified third at Silverstone, but in the wet conditions that race one was held in, Félix da Costa managed to overtake Vainio off the line, and Mitch Evans early on the first lap. He held the lead from the remainder of the race to take his first win of the season. He finished sixth in the weekend's second race, enabling him to move into third place in the drivers' championship.

After a double retirement at Hockenheim, Félix da Costa scored his second victory of the season at the Hungaroring. Qualifying second to Vainio, Félix da Costa managed to hold off the advances of Evans at the start of the race, and eventually pulled away from his rivals. Evans was later passed by Lotus GP's Daniel Abt, but Félix da Costa maintained a four-second lead over them both and remained clear to the end. With the reverse-grid system, Félix da Costa started eighth for the second race, held in drying conditions. He had moved up to fifth place, on wet tyres, before making a pit stop for dry tyres. At one point during the race, Félix da Costa was lapping some ten seconds quicker than race leaders Matias Laine and Vainio, quickly making his way through the order. He moved into the lead with three laps to go, and ultimately won the race – becoming the first GP3 driver to win both races during a race weekend – by almost twelve seconds from Patric Niederhauser. At Spa-Francorchamps, Félix da Costa finished both races in second position to move himself into championship contention, 21.5 points behind championship leader Evans. However, the opening race at Monza eliminated him from the running after a strange electronic problem in the car forcing him to stop during the race, the car suddenly gained power again and he managed to finish the race in 15th, and he ultimately fell to third in the final drivers' championship standings thanks to a win and second for Abt at the meeting.

=== Formula Renault 3.5 ===
==== 2012 ====
Midway through the 2012 season, Félix da Costa was selected to join the Red Bull Junior Team, replacing Formula Renault 3.5 Series driver Lewis Williamson, who had failed to score a point in the first three meetings of the season. Félix da Costa was selected to replace Williamson at the Arden Caterham squad – joining Alexander Rossi at the team – ahead of the fourth round of the season, at the Nürburgring. In his début race, Félix da Costa achieved a ninth-place finish, scoring two points towards the championship. At Moscow Raceway, Félix da Costa was able to qualify in seventh position for the series' first-ever race at the track, out-qualifying Rossi by almost three tenths of a second. He passed Nico Müller at the start of the race and was able to hold sixth place for the first half of the race before being demoted by Kevin Korjus. Félix da Costa held seventh until the end of the race; he finished fifteenth in the weekend's second race.

At Silverstone, Félix da Costa improved upon his best finish in the series, taking a fifth-place finish in an attritional opening race of the weekend, in which only eleven of the race's twenty-six starters were classified. He also recorded the fastest lap of the race, as he avoided all the incidents that befell other drivers. Félix da Costa achieved his first podium finish the following day, turning a ninth-place grid start into a second-place finish. He finished fourth in the opening race at the Hungaroring, before taking a final-lap victory – his first in the series – during the second race, after an engine failure had eliminated race leader Kevin Magnussen. Félix da Costa continued his good form into the following meeting at Le Castellet, winning a rain-affected opening race from as low as sixth position during the race. Félix da Costa qualified seventh for the second race of the weekend, which was run in similar conditions to the first. He had taken the lead by lap six, having passed Jules Bianchi for the position; Bianchi later overturned the advantage in the mandatory pit-stop phase, and ultimately held on to win from Félix da Costa.

Félix da Costa closed the season with a double victory in Catalunya; he won the first race after passing championship contender Sam Bird eight laps from the end, while the final race of the season was another standout wet-weather performance from Félix da Costa, taking victory by almost 28 seconds. Despite missing the first five races of the season, Félix da Costa finished the season fourth in the drivers' championship with 166 points, missing out on the championship title, won by Robin Frijns, by 23 points. Following his performances in both GP3 and Formula Renault 3.5, Félix da Costa was invited to test with the Red Bull Racing Formula One team during the Young Drivers' Test in Abu Dhabi. He tested for two of the scheduled three days, finishing with the second-fastest time – to Magnussen, driving for McLaren – on the opening day, before topping the time-sheets on day two, recording a time half a second quicker than the next best driver, Oliver Turvey.

==== 2013 ====
In an interview with Portuguese newspaper Diário de Notícias in September 2012, Félix da Costa stated that he was seeking a full-time seat in the Formula Renault 3.5 Series for the 2013 season. On 9 January 2013, it was announced that Félix da Costa would be remaining with the Arden Caterham team that he had competed in the series with, during the 2012 season. Félix da Costa, along with Kevin Magnussen, was tipped by the 2012 champion Robin Frijns to be one of the main championship challengers for the season.

== DTM ==
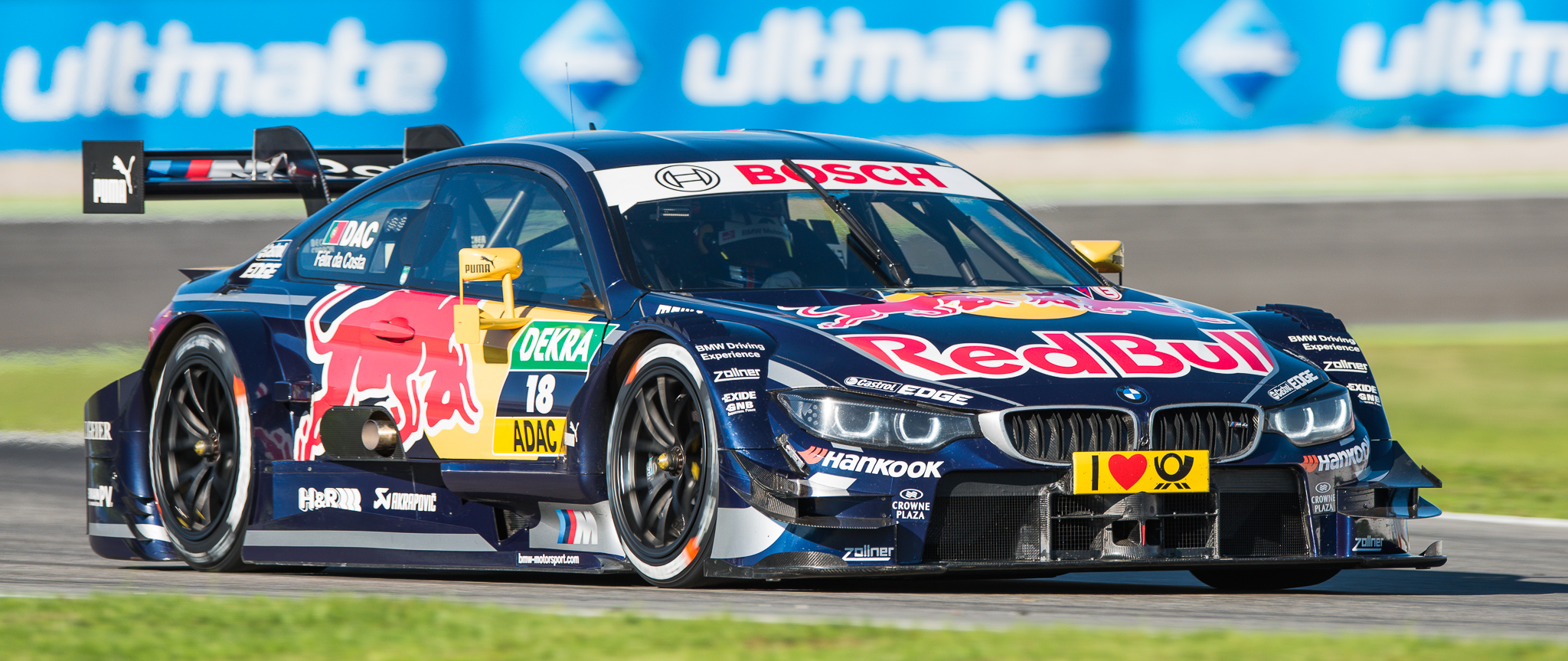
Félix da Costa competing during the 2014 Deutsche Tourenwagen Masters season, his first season in touring car racing.

=== 2014 ===
Félix da Costa competed in the 2014 Deutsche Tourenwagen Masters season for the BMW MTEK team alongside Timo Glock. He scored points on two occasions, finishing the season in 21st place with a total of six points. He was retained for the 2015 season.

=== 2015 ===
In 2015, Félix da Costa moved to BMW Team Schnitzer, driving alongside Martin Tomczyk. He did not score any points until race seven at Zandvoort, where he got his first podium, finishing in second position. He won the second race of the weekend for his first DTM victory. He was as high as eighth in points, but ultimately finished eleventh at the end of the season.

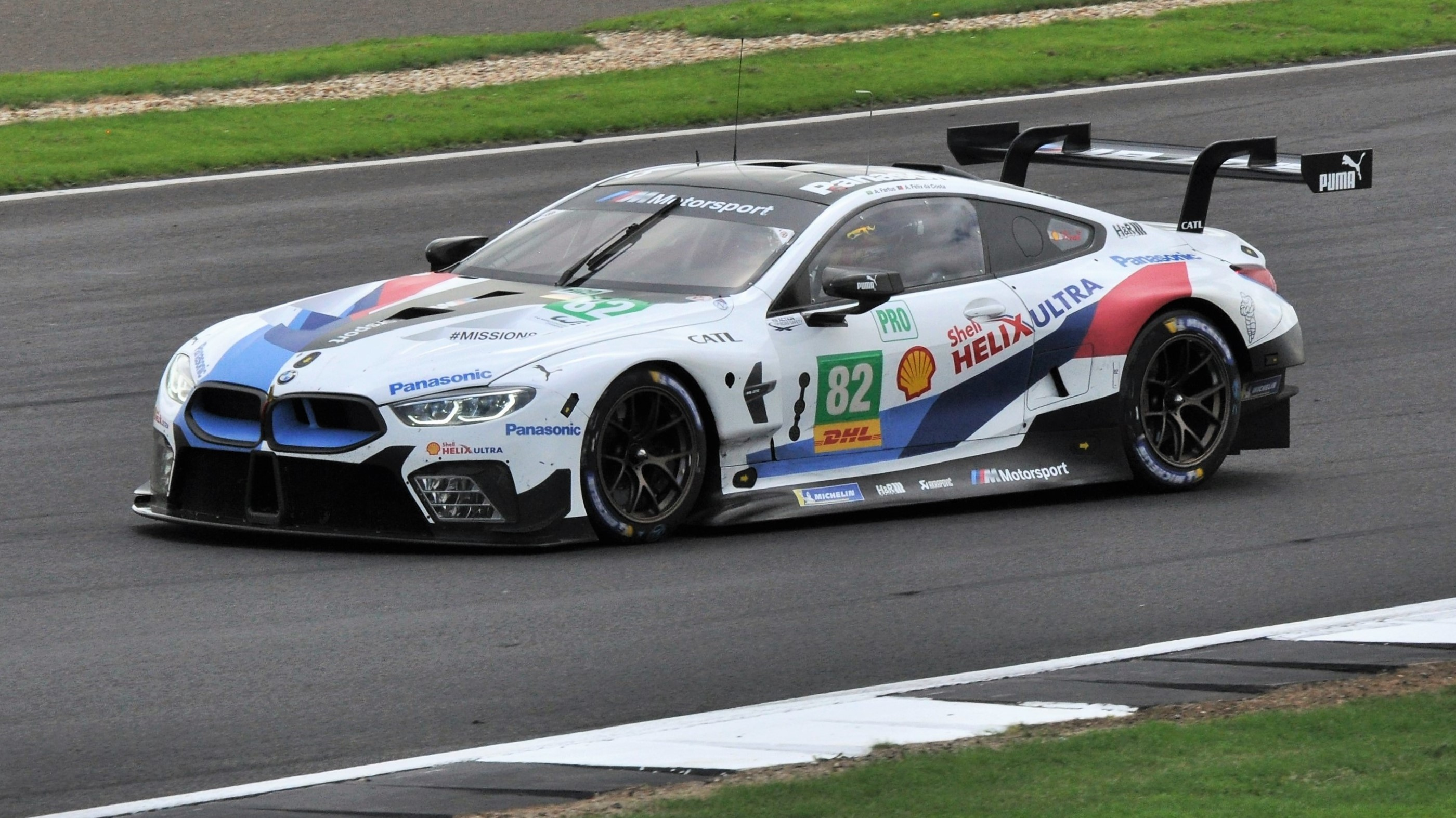
Félix da Costa racing in the 2018 6 Hours of Silverstone.

== Formula E ==
=== Team Aguri (2014–2016) ===
==== 2014–15 season ====
Félix da Costa competed in the inaugural Formula E season, competing for Team Aguri in rounds that did not clash with his DTM commitments. In the team, he raced alongside Katherine Legge and Salvador Durán during his time in the championship. The 2015 Buenos Aires ePrix saw da Costa get his only win of the season after coming up through the field from eighth. Thereafter, he only had one non-points finish, which occurred at the 2015 Berlin ePrix where he finished in eleventh position. At the end of the season, he had 51 points and secured eighth position in the standings.

==== 2015–16 season ====
For the 2015–16 Formula E season, Félix da Costa retained his seat with Team Aguri alongside Nathanaël Berthon, Salvador Durán and Ma Qinghua. Unfortunately, he had several good races taken away from his due to unreliability. For the first 3 races of the season, he raced alongside Nathanaël Berthon before the French driver was dropped in favour of season 1 driver Salvador Durán, who himself was replaced by Ma Qinghua just three races later in the season. Due to DTM commitments, Félix da Costa was unable to race the 2016 Berlin ePrix and was himself replaced by René Rast for the race. He would return for the double header to end the season in London. Félix da Costa's best finish of the season was sixth place, which he achieved three times, at Putrajaya, Punta del Este and London(1). During the 2015 Beijing ePrix, he was running in the podium positions when the car had a mechanical failure, putting him out of the ePrix. At the 2016 Buenos Aires ePrix, he was going for a potential back-to-back win at the track when another car failure, this time a safety cap piece, put him out of the race. Again, bad luck would strike Félix da Costa at the 2016 Long Beach ePrix when he claimed a sensational pole position only to be disqualified due to his right rear tyre pressure being 0.3psi below minimum. At the 2016 London ePrix for race 2, da Costa finished an impressive fourth only to have a penalty for using too much power demote him to ninth, then a second penalty for track limits down to 11th. When the season had finished, Motorsport.com placed him fourth overall in the top-ten drivers of the season due to keeping cool at all times, even when faced with so much bad luck.

=== Andretti / BMW i Andretti Motorsport (2016–2019) ===
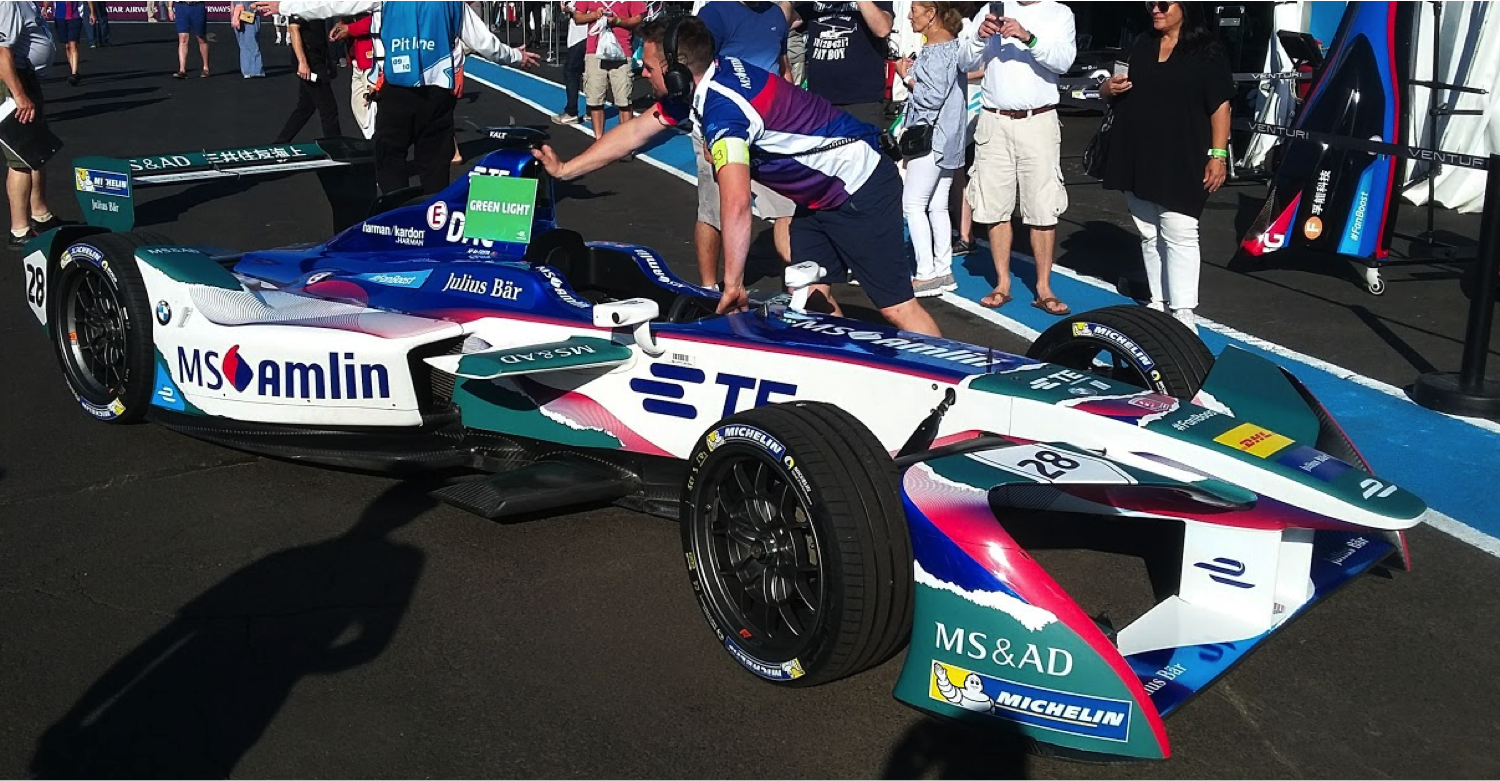
da Costa's car in the 2017 New York City ePrix paddock prior to qualifying

==== 2016–17 season ====
On 3 July 2016, Félix da Costa announced he would be leaving Team Aguri for season 3 but would be staying in Formula E with another outfit. He was subsequently confirmed as racing alongside Robin Frijns at Andretti.

==== 2017–18 season ====
Félix da Costa remained with Andretti for the 2017–18 season.

==== 2018–19 season ====
Félix da Costa was retained by Andretti for the 2018–19 season alongside Alexander Sims. He took the pole position and won in the 2018 Ad Diriyah ePrix, the first race of the season with BMW after three seasons without podiums. In the second round of 2019 Marrakesh ePrix, he was leading the race before his clash with his teammate Sims which caused his retirement of the race.

=== DS Techeetah (2019–2022) ===
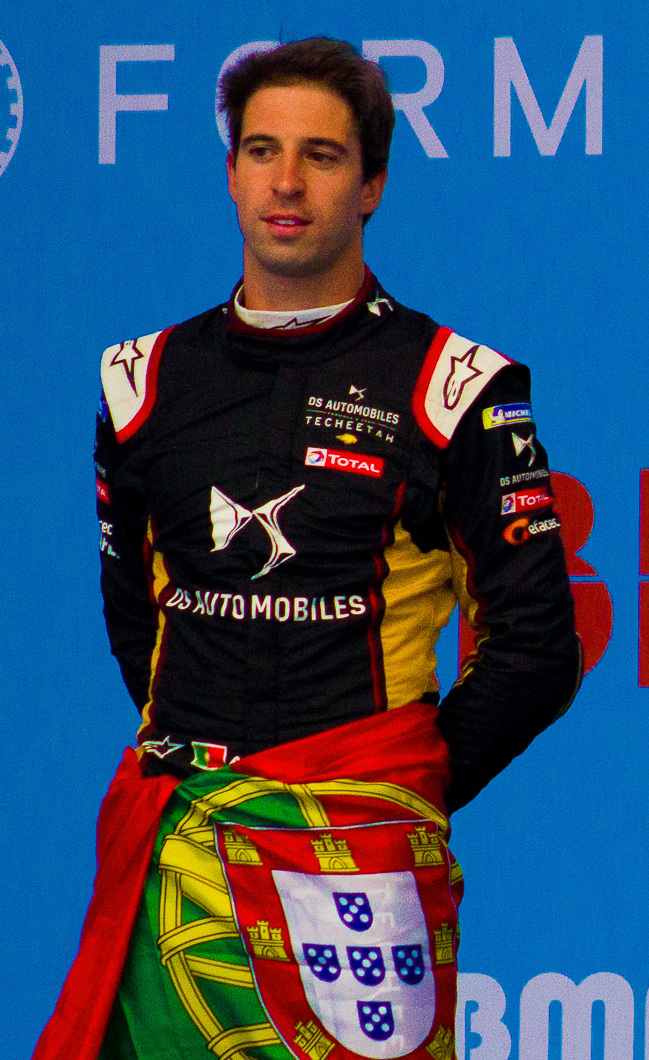
Félix da Costa at the 2020 Mexico City ePrix

==== 2019–20 season ====
In 2019, Félix da Costa left Andretti and joined 2018-19 Teams' Champion DS Techeetah to race alongside defending champion Jean-Éric Vergne. He scored his first podium finish of the season in Santiago, finishing second behind Maximilian Günther. He finished second behind Mitch Evans in Mexico. Félix da Costa's first win for DS Techeetah was in Marrakesh, which was the third biggest winning margin in Formula E history (11.427 seconds).

Following the hiatus caused by the global COVID-19 pandemic, Félix da Costa put in a string of dominant performances at the Berlin Templehof Circuit, claiming two wins and a podium to seal the Drivers' title, while also securing the Constructors' Championship for DS Techeetah with two races remaining. As a result of his performance in the season, he received the Order of Merit from President Marcelo Rebelo de Sousa.

==== 2020–21 season ====
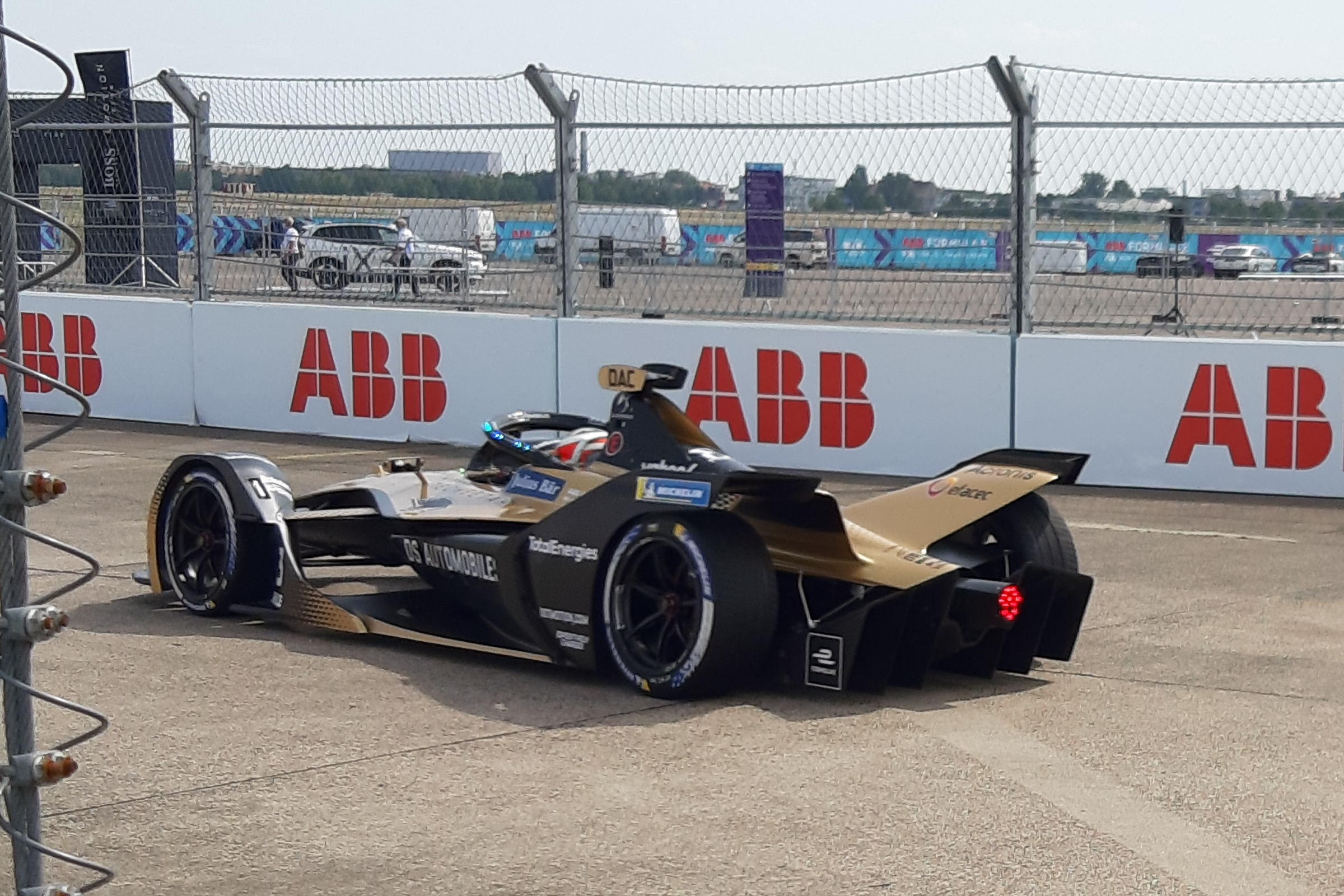
da Costa with DS Techeetah at the 2021 Berlin ePrix

Félix da Costa continued with DS Techeetah alongside Jean-Éric Vergne for the 2020–21 season.

==== 2021–22 season ====
Félix da Costa remained with DS Techeetah for the 2021–22 season, once again partnering Jean-Éric Vergne.

=== TAG Heuer Porsche Formula E Team (2023–2025) ===
==== 2022–23 season ====
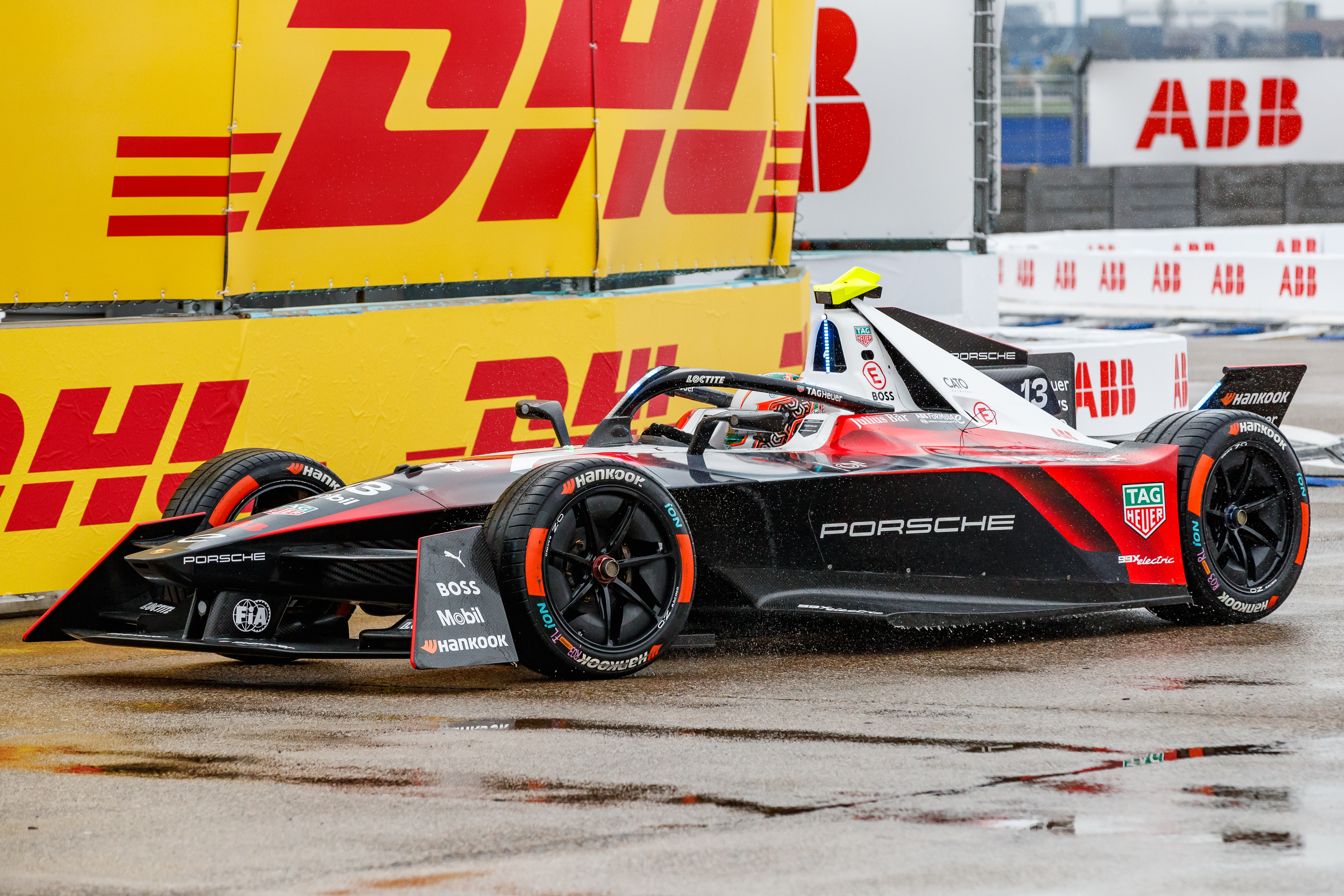
da Costa at the 2023 Berlin ePrix

After three years at DS Techeetah, Félix da Costa switched to TAG Heuer Porsche for the 2022–23 season, replacing André Lotterer and partnering Pascal Wehrlein. The year would start out in a disappointing manner, as the opening pair of events yielded but one points finish for the Portuguese driver, whilst teammate Wehrlein had taken the lead of the championship. Félix da Costa would fight back in Hyderabad, profiting from a chaotic race to take third after Sébastien Buemi was awarded a post-race penalty, with da Costa having started from 13th in his 100th race in the category. Even more success presented itself in Cape Town, where the Porsche driver made a succession of passes on Nick Cassidy and Jean-Éric Vergne at the tight Turn 7, helping himself to his first victory of the season.

==== 2023–24 season ====
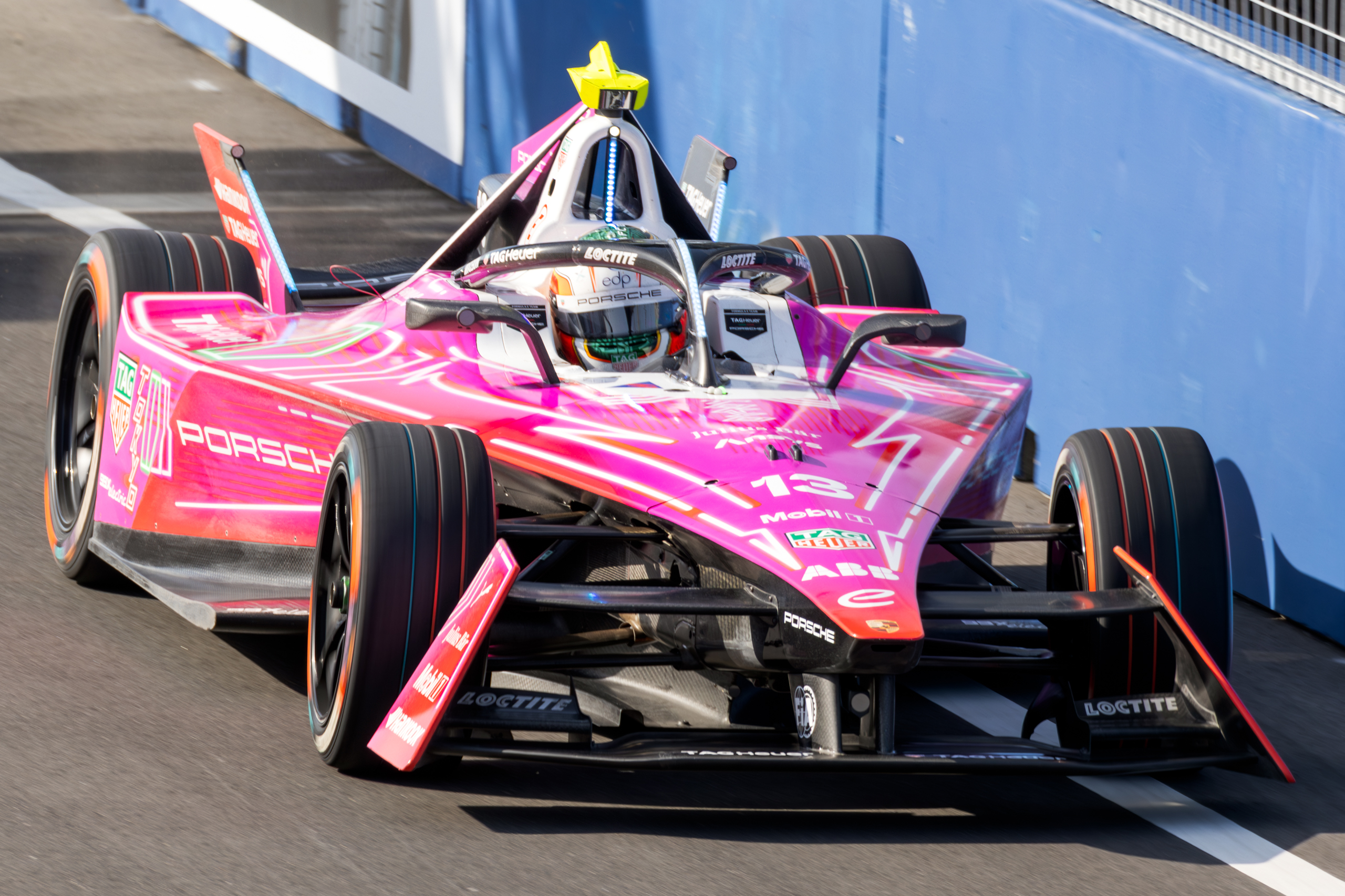
da Costa at the 2024 Tokyo ePrix

Félix da Costa remained with Porsche. In the second half of the season, Félix da Costa scored five on-track victories in Misano race 1 (disqualified), Berlin race 2, Shanghai race 2, and in both rounds of the Portland ePrix.

==== 2024–25 season ====
Félix da Costa and Pascal Wehrlein would continue with Porsche into the 2024–25 season. Following the season, Félix da Costa and the team parted ways.

=== Jaguar Racing (2025–present) ===
Félix da Costa switched to Jaguar Racing ahead of the 2025–26 season, alongside Mitch Evans.

== Sportscar racing career ==
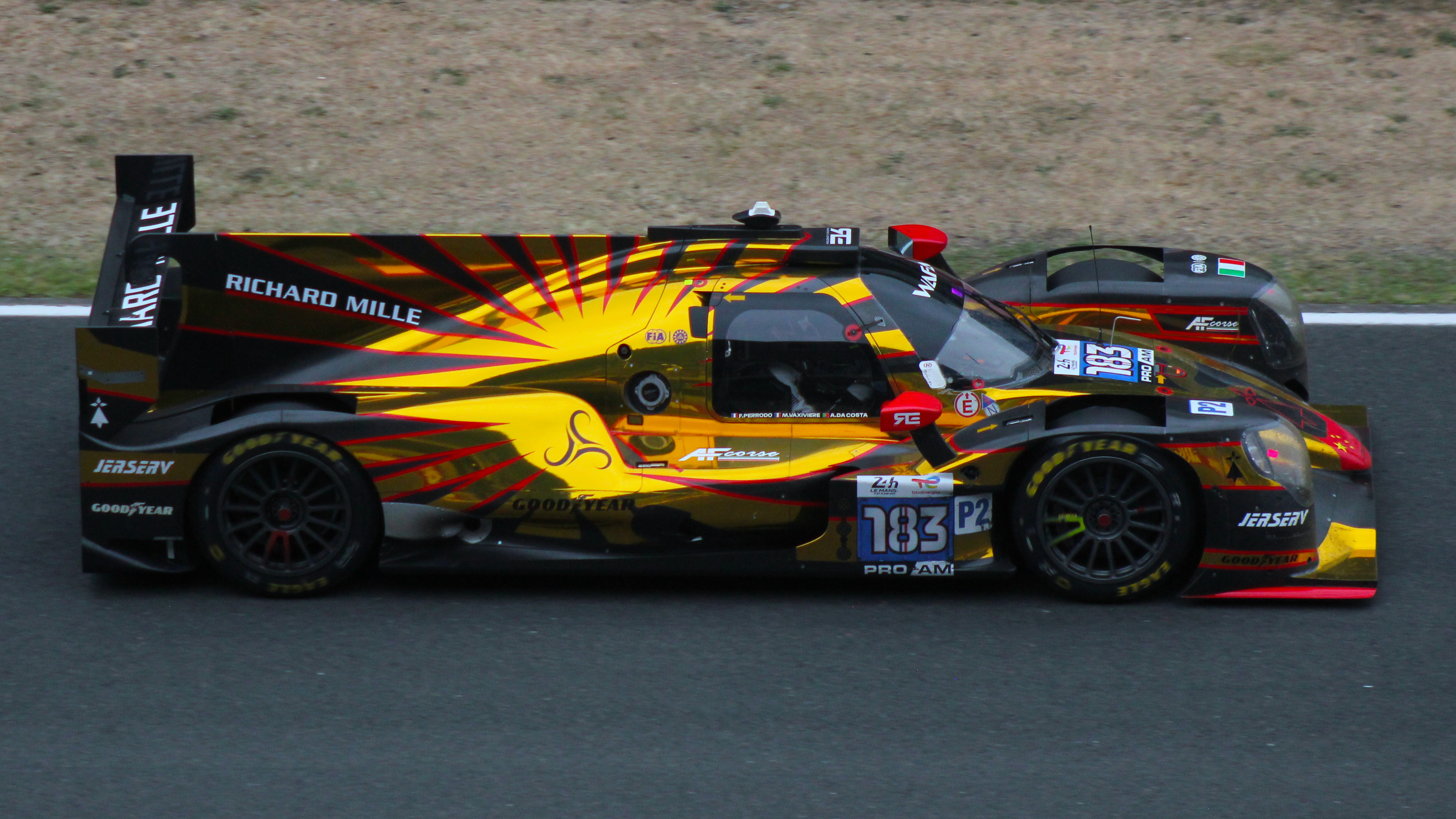
Félix da Costa's No. 183 car at the 2025 24 Hours of Le Mans

=== Alpine (2026–present) ===
Félix Da Costa returned to the FIA World Endurance Championship in 2026, joining the Alpine Endurance Team.

== Personal life ==
Félix da Costa's older half-brother Duarte is also a racing driver, who primarily competes in touring car and sports car racing; Duarte also serves as his manager.

Outside of racing, Félix da Costa enjoys surfing. He is fluent in five languages: Portuguese, Spanish, French, English, and Italian.

== Racing record ==
=== Career summary ===
Season	Series	Team	Races	Wins	Poles	F/Laps	Podiums	Points	Position
2008	Formula Renault UK Winter Series	CR Scuderia	4	0	0	0	1	N/A	NC†
2008	Formula Renault 2.0 Portugal Winter Series	Motopark Academy	2	0	0	0	0	4	17th
2008	Eurocup Formula Renault 2.0	Motopark Academy	6	0	0	0	0	18	13th
2008	Formula Renault 2.0 NEC	Motopark Academy	16	1	1	1	10	280	**2nd**
2009	Eurocup Formula Renault 2.0	Motopark Academy	14	3	2	3	9	128	**3rd**
2009	Formula Renault 2.0 NEC	Motopark Academy	14	9	4	7	11	361	**1st**
2010	Formula 3 Euro Series	Motopark Academy	18	3	0	1	4	40	7th
2010	Masters of Formula 3	Motopark Academy	1	0	0	0	0	N/A	18th
2010	GP3 Series	Carlin	4	0	0	0	0	3	26th
2010	Macau Grand Prix	Carlin	1	0	0	0	0	N/A	6th
2010	Formula One	Force India	Test driver						
2011	GP3 Series	Status Grand Prix	16	1	0	0	1	16	13th
2011	British Formula 3 International Series	Hitech Racing	6	0	0	1	3	51	13th
2011	Macau Grand Prix	Hitech Racing	1	0	0	0	0	N/A	DNF
2011	GP2 Final	Ocean Racing Technology	2	0	0	0	0	2	9th
2012	Formula Renault 3.5 Series	Arden Caterham	12	4	0	2	6	166	4th
2012	GP3 Series	Carlin	16	3	1	6	6	132	**3rd**
2012	MotorSport Vision Formula Three Cup	Carlin	2	2	1	2	2	N/A	NC†
2012	Macau Grand Prix	Carlin	1	1	1	1	1	N/A	**1st**
2012	Formula One	Red Bull Racing	Test driver						
2013	Formula Renault 3.5 Series	Arden Caterham	17	3	1	2	6	172	**3rd**
2014	Deutsche Tourenwagen Masters	BMW Team MTEK	10	0	0	0	0	6	21st
2014–15	Formula E	Amlin Aguri	8	1	0	0	1	51	8th
2015	Deutsche Tourenwagen Masters	BMW Team Schnitzer	18	1	1	1	3	79	11th
2015	Stock Car Brasil	Full Time Sports	1	0	0	0	1	0	NC†
2015–16	Formula E	Team Aguri	9	0	0	0	0	28	13th
2016	Deutsche Tourenwagen Masters	BMW Team Schnitzer	18	0	2	1	1	43	17th
2016	ADAC GT Masters	Schubert Motorsport	2	0	0	0	0	0	NC
2016	Stock Car Brasil	Full Time Sports	1	0	0	0	1	0	NC†
2016	Macau Grand Prix	Carlin	1	1	1	0	1	N/A	**1st**
2016–17	Formula E	MS Amlin Andretti	12	0	0	0	0	10	20th
2017	Blancpain GT Series Sprint Cup	Rowe Racing	6	0	0	1	0	2	26th
2017	International GT Open	BMW Team Teo Martín	6	1	1	0	2	41	12th
2017	Stock Car Brasil	HERO Motorsport	2	0	0	0	1	0	NC†
2017	24 Hours of Nürburgring - SP9	BMW Team Schnitzer	1	0	0	0	0	N/A	DNF
2017–18	Formula E	MS&AD Andretti Formula E	12	0	0	0	0	20	15th
2018	IMSA SportsCar Championship - Prototype	Jackie Chan DCR JOTA	1	0	0	0	0	26	51st
2018	24 Hours of Le Mans - LMGTE Pro	BMW Team MTEK	1	0	0	0	0	N/A	DNF
2018	Stock Car Brasil	HERO Motorsport II	1	0	0	1	1	0	NC†
2018–19	Formula E	BMW i Andretti Motorsport	13	1	1	1	4	99	6th
2018–19	FIA World Endurance Championship - LMGTE Pro	BMW Team MTEK	8	0	0	1	1	61	10th
2019	24 Hours of Le Mans - LMGTE Pro	BMW Team MTEK	1	0	0	0	0	N/A	10th
2019–20	Formula E	DS Techeetah	11	3	3	2	6	158	**1st**
2019–20	FIA World Endurance Championship - LMP2	Jota Sport	8	1	0	2	5	152	**3rd**
2020	24 Hours of Le Mans - LMP2	Jota Sport	1	0	0	0	1	N/A	**2nd**
2020–21	Formula E	DS Techeetah	15	1	2	0	3	86	8th
2021	FIA World Endurance Championship - LMP2	Jota Sport	6	1	1	0	4	123	**3rd**
2021	24 Hours of Le Mans - LMP2	Jota Sport	1	0	1	0	0	N/A	8th
2021	Stock Car Brasil	Eurofarma RC	2	1	0	0	1	N/A	NC†
2021–22	Formula E	DS Techeetah	16	1	2	0	2	122	8th
2022	FIA World Endurance Championship - LMP2	Jota	6	1	1	1	5	137	**1st**
2022	24 Hours of Le Mans - LMP2	Jota	1	1	0	0	1	N/A	**1st**
2022–23	Formula E	TAG Heuer Porsche Formula E Team	16	1	0	0	3	93	9th
2023	FIA World Endurance Championship - Hypercar	Hertz Team Jota	5	0	0	0	0	38	9th
2023	FIA World Endurance Championship - LMP2	Hertz Team Jota	1	0	0	0	0	0	NC†
2023	24 Hours of Le Mans - Hypercar	Hertz Team Jota	1	0	0	0	0	N/A	13th
2023–24	Formula E	TAG Heuer Porsche Formula E Team	16	4	0	1	4	134	6th
2024–25	Formula E	TAG Heuer Porsche Formula E Team	16	0	0	0	4	111	5th
2025	IMSA SportsCar Championship - LMP2	Inter Europol Competition	1	0	0	0	0	231	56th
2025	24 Hours of Le Mans - LMP2	AF Corse	1	0	0	0	0	N/A	9th
2025–26	Formula E	Jaguar TCS Racing	15	2	0	0	4	111	4th*
2026	FIA World Endurance Championship - Hypercar	Alpine Endurance Team	5	0	0	0	1	44	15th
2026	24 Hours of Le Mans - Hypercar	Alpine Endurance Team	1	0	0	0	0	N/A	6th
2026	IMSA SportsCar Championship - LMP2	Inter Europol Competition	1	0	1	0	1	355	32nd
2026–27	Formula E	Jaguar TCS Racing	0	0	0	0	0	0	TBD

^{†} As da Costa was a guest driver, he was ineligible for points.
^{*} Season still in progress.

=== Complete Formula Renault 2.0 NEC results ===
(key) (Races in bold indicate pole position, races in italics indicate fastest lap)

Year	Entrant	1	2	3	4	5	6	7	8	9	10	11	12	13	14	15	16	DC	Points
2008	Motopark Academy	HOC; 1; 3	HOC; 2; 20	ZAN; 1; 2	ZAN; 2; 3	ALA; 1; 14	ALA; 2; 2	**OSC**; **1**; 1	OSC; 2; 2	ASS; 1; 3	ASS; 2; 4	ZOL; 1; 2	ZOL; 2; 3	NÜR; 1; 7	NÜR; 2; 22	SPA; 1; 3	SPA; 2; 6	2nd	279
2009	Motopark Academy	ZAN; 1; 2	ZAN; 2; 1	HOC; 1; 1	HOC; 2; 6	ALA; 1	ALA; 2	**OSC**; **1**; 1	OSC; 2; 1	**ASS**; **1**; 1	ASS; 2; 1	MST; 1; 8	MST; 2; 1	NÜR; 1; 6	NÜR; 1; 1	**SPA**; **1**; 1	SPA; 2; 2	1st	361

=== Complete Eurocup Formula Renault 2.0 results ===
(key) (Races in bold indicate pole position, races in italics indicate fastest lap)

Year	Entrant	1	2	3	4	5	6	7	8	9	10	11	12	13	14	DC	Points
2008	Motopark Academy	SPA; 1; 16	SPA; 2; 9	SIL; 1	SIL; 2	HUN; 1	HUN; 2	NÜR; 1; 10	NÜR; 2; 9	LMS; 1	LMS; 2	EST; 1; 5	EST; 2; 4	CAT; 1	CAT; 2	13th	19
2009	Motopark Academy	CAT; 1; 3	CAT; 2; 2	SPA; 1; 2	SPA; 2; 2	HUN; 1; 4	HUN; 1; 5	SIL; 1; 1	SIL; 2 Ret	LMS; 1; 3	LMS; 2; 2	NÜR; 1 DSQ	NÜR; 1 DSQ	**ARA**; **1**; 1	**ARA**; **2**; 1	3rd	128

=== Complete Formula 3 Euro Series results ===
(key) (Races in bold indicate pole position, races in italics indicate fastest lap)

Year	Entrant	Chassis	Engine	1	2	3	4	5	6	7	8	9	10	11	12	13	14	15	16	17	18	DC	Points
2010	Motopark Academy	Dallara F308/098	Volkswagen	LEC; 1; 8	LEC; 2; 8	HOC; 1; 7	HOC; 2; 9	VAL; 1; 6	VAL; 2 Ret	NOR; 1; 7	NOR; 2 Ret	NÜR; 1; 7	NÜR; 2; 1	ZAN; 1; 8	ZAN; 2; 1	BRH; 1; 8	BRH; 2; 1	OSC; 1; 3	OSC; 2 Ret	HOC; 1; 9	HOC; 2; 4	7th	40

=== Complete GP3 Series results ===
(key) (Races in bold indicate pole position, races in italics indicate fastest lap)

Year	Entrant	1	2	3	4	5	6	7	8	9	10	11	12	13	14	15	16	DC	Points
2010	Carlin	CAT; FEA	CAT; SPR	IST; FEA	IST; SPR	VAL; FEA	VAL; SPR	SIL; FEA	SIL; SPR	HOC; FEA	HOC; SPR	HUN; FEA; 6	HUN; SPR; 17	SPA; FEA; Ret	SPA; SPR; 12	MNZ; FEA	MNZ; SPR	26th	3
2011	Status Grand Prix	IST; FEA; 5	IST; SPR; 4	CAT; FEA; 12	CAT; SPR; 17	VAL; FEA; Ret	VAL; SPR; 20†	SIL; FEA; 19	SIL; SPR; 9	NÜR; FEA; 28	NÜR; SPR; Ret	HUN; FEA; 11	HUN; SPR; 6	SPA; FEA; Ret	SPA; SPR; 11	MNZ; FEA; 7	MNZ; SPR; 1	13th	16
2012	Carlin	**CAT**; **FEA**; 14	CAT; SPR; 7	MON; FEA; 7	MON; SPR; 2	VAL; FEA; Ret	VAL; SPR; 8	SIL; FEA; 1	SIL; SPR; 6	HOC; FEA; Ret	HOC; SPR; Ret	HUN; FEA; 1	HUN; SPR; 1	SPA; FEA; 2^{‡}	SPA; SPR; 2	MNZ; FEA; 15	MNZ; SPR; 5	**3rd**	**132**

^{†} Driver did not finish, but completed 90% of the race distance.
‡ Half points awarded as less than 75% of the race distance was completed.

=== Complete GP2 Final results ===
(key) (Races in bold indicate pole position) (Races in italics indicate fastest lap)

Year	Entrant	1	2	DC	Points
2011	Ocean Racing Technology	YMC; FEA; 7	YMC; SPR; 13	9th	2

=== Complete Formula Renault 3.5 Series results ===
(key) (Races in bold indicate pole position, races in italics indicate fastest lap)

Year	Team	1	2	3	4	5	6	7	8	9	10	11	12	13	14	15	16	17	Pos	Points
2012	Arden Caterham	ARA; 1	ARA; 2	MON; 1	SPA; 1	SPA; 2	NÜR; 1; 9	NÜR; 2; 11	MSC; 1; 7	MSC; 2; 15	SIL; 1; 5	SIL; 2; 2	HUN; 1; 4	HUN; 2; 1	LEC; 1; 1	LEC; 2; 2	CAT; 1; 1	CAT; 2; 1	4th	166
2013	Arden Caterham	MNZ; 1 Ret	**MNZ**; **2**; 1	ARA; 1; 13	ARA; 2; 7	MON; 1; 5	SPA; 1; 2	SPA; 2; 4	MSC; 1; 2	MSC; 2 Ret	RBR; 1; 7	RBR; 2 Ret	HUN; 1 Ret	HUN; 2; 1	LEC; 1; 1	LEC; 2; 3	CAT; 1; 4	CAT; 2; 13	**3rd**	**172**

=== Complete Deutsche Tourenwagen Masters results ===
(key) (Races in bold indicate pole position; races in italics indicate fastest lap)

Year	Team	Car	1	2	3	4	5	6	7	8	9	10	11	12	13	14	15	16	17	18	Pos	Points
2014	BMW Team MTEK	BMW M4 DTM	HOC; 21†	OSC; 11	HUN; 8	NOR; 20	MSC; 11	SPL; Ret	NÜR; 13	LAU; Ret	ZAN; 14	HOC; 9									21st	6
2015	BMW Team Schnitzer	BMW M4 DTM	HOC; 1; 13	HOC; 2; 20	LAU; 1; 19	LAU; 2; 14	NOR; 1; 12	NOR; 2; 12	ZAN; 1; 2	**ZAN**; **2**; 1	SPL; 1; 13	SPL; 2; 10	MSC; 1; 11	MSC; 2; 23	OSC; 1; 3	OSC; 2; 4	NÜR; 1; 9	NÜR; 2; 15	HOC; 1; 11	HOC; 2; 7	11th	79
2016	BMW Team Schnitzer	BMW M4 DTM	HOC; 1; 7	HOC; 2 Ret	SPL; 1; 22	SPL; 2; 21	LAU; 1; 15	LAU; 2; 14	NOR; 1; 9	NOR; 2 DSQ	ZAN; 1; 6	ZAN; 2; 17	MSC; 1; 20	MSC; 2; 19	NÜR; 1; 20	NÜR; 2; 19	HUN; 1; 16	HUN; 2; 3	**HOC**; **1**; 4	**HOC**; **2** Ret	17th	43

^{†} Driver did not finish, but completed 90% of the race distance.

=== Complete Formula E results ===
(key) (Races in bold indicate pole position; races in italics indicate fastest lap)

Year	Team	Chassis	Powertrain	1	2	3	4	5	6	7	8	9	10	11	12	13	14	15	16	17	Pos	Points
2014–15	Amlin Aguri	Spark SRT01-e	SRT01-e	BEI	PUT; 8	PDE; Ret	BUE; 1	MIA; 6	LBH; 7	MCO; 9	BER; 11	MSC; 7	LDN	LDN							8th	51
2015–16	Team Aguri	Spark SRT01-e	SRT01-e	BEI; Ret	PUT; 6	PDE; 6	BUE; Ret	MEX; Ret	LBH; Ret	PAR; 8	BER	LDN; 6	LDN; 11								13th	28
2016–17	MS Amlin Andretti	Spark SRT01-e	Andretti ATEC-02	HKG; 5	MRK; Ret	BUE; 11	MEX; Ret	MCO; 11	PAR; Ret	BER; 16	BER; 11	NYC; 12	NYC; 15	MTL; 14	MTL; 15						20th	10
2017–18	MS&AD Andretti Formula E	Spark SRT01-e	Andretti ATEC-03	HKG; 6	HKG; 11	MRK; 14	SCL; 9	MEX; 7	PDE; 11	RME; 11	PAR; Ret	BER; 15	ZUR; 8	NYC; 11	NYC; 15						15th	20
2018–19	BMW i Andretti Motorsport	Spark SRT05e	BMW iFE.18	**ADR**; 1	MRK; Ret	SCL; Ret	MEX; 2	HKG; 10	SYX; 3	RME; 9	PAR; 7	MCO; DSQ	BER; 4	BRN; 12	NYC; 3	NYC; 9					6th	99
2019–20	DS Techeetah	Spark SRT05e	DS E-TENSE FE20	DIR; 14	DIR; 10	SCL; 2	MEX; 2	**MRK**; 1	**BER**; 1	**BER**; 1	BER; 4	BER; 2	BER; Ret	BER; 9							1st	158
2020–21	DS Techeetah	Spark SRT05e	DS E-TENSE FE20/21	DIR; 11	DIR; 3	RME; Ret	RME; 7	**VLC**; DSQ	VLC; 22	**MCO**; 1	PUE; 6	PUE; Ret	NYC; 12	NYC; 3	LDN; 8	LDN; Ret	BER; 7	BER; Ret			8th	86
2021–22	DS Techeetah	Spark SRT05e	DS E-TENSE FE21	DRH; Ret	DRH; 12	MEX; 4	RME; 6	RME; 13	MCO; 5	BER; 8	BER; 6	JAK; 4	**MRK**; 2	NYC; Ret	NYC; 1	LDN; 7	LDN; 5	SEO; 9	**SEO**; 10		8th	122
2022–23	TAG Heuer Porsche Formula E Team	Formula E Gen3	Porsche 99X Electric	MEX; 7	DRH; 18	DRH; 11	HYD; 3	CAP; 1	SAP; 4	BER; Ret	BER; 5	MCO; 15	JAK; 8	JAK; 7	POR; 3	RME; Ret	RME; 12	LDN; 16	LDN; 16		9th	93
2023–24	TAG Heuer Porsche Formula E Team	Formula E Gen3	Porsche 99X Electric	MEX; Ret	DRH; 16	DRH; 14	SAP; 6	TOK; 4	MIS; DSQ	MIS; 17	MCO; 7	BER; 6	BER; 1	SHA; 18	SHA; 1	POR; 1	POR; 1	LDN; Ret	LDN; 13		6th	134
2024–25	TAG Heuer Porsche Formula E Team	Formula E Gen3 Evo	Porsche 99X Electric	SAO; 2	MEX; 2	JED; 9	JED; Ret	MIA; 3	MCO; Ret	MCO; 4	TKO; 7	TKO; Ret	SHA; 13	SHA; 3	JKT; 5	BER; 10	BER; 8	LDN; 14	LDN; 6		5th	111
2025–26	Jaguar TCS Racing	Formula E Gen3 Evo	Jaguar I-Type 7	SAO; 11	MEX; Ret	MIA; 8	JED; 5	JED; 1	MAD; 1	BER; 10	BER; 18	MCO; Ret	MCO; 3	SAN; 4	SHA; 2	SHA; 14	TKO; 9	TKO; 14	LDN; 3	LDN; 15	6th	128

^{*} Season still in progress.

=== Complete Stock Car Brasil results ===
Year	Team	Car	1	2	3	4	5	6	7	8	9	10	11	12	13	14	15	16	17	18	19	20	21	22	23	24	Rank	Pts.
2015	Full Time Sports	Chevrolet Sonic	GOI; 1; 3	RBP; 1	RBP; 2	VEL; 1	VEL; 2	CUR; 1	CUR; 2	SCZ; 1	SCZ; 2	CUR; 1	CUR; 2	GOI; 1	CAS; 1	CAS; 2	MOU; 1	MOU; 2	CUR; 1	CUR; 2	TAR; 1	TAR; 2	INT; 1				NC†	0†
2016	Full Time Sports	Chevrolet Sonic	CUR; 1; 2	VEL; 1	VEL; 2	GOI; 1	GOI; 2	SCZ; 1	SCZ; 2	TAR; 1	TAR; 2	CAS; 1	CAS; 2	INT; 1	LON; 1	LON; 2	CUR; 1	CUR; 2	GOI; 1	GOI; 2	CRI; 1	CRI; 2	INT; 1				NC†	0†
2017	Full Time Bassani	Chevrolet Cruze	GOI; 1	GOI; 2	VEL; 1	VEL; 2	SCZ; 1	SCZ; 2	CAS; 1	CAS; 2	CUR; 1	CRI; 1	CRI; 2	VCA; 1	VCA; 2	LON; 1	LON; 2	ARG; 1	ARG; 2	TAR; 1	TAR; 2	GOI; 1; 3	GOI; 2 Ret	INT; 1			NC†	0†
2018	RCM Motorsport	Chevrolet Cruze	INT; 1	CUR; 1	CUR; 2	VEL; 1	VEL; 2	LON; 1	LON; 2	SCZ; 1	SCZ; 2	GOI; 1; 3	MOU; 1	MOU; 2	CAS; 1	CAS; 2	VCA; 1	VCA; 2	TAR; 1	TAR; 2	GOI; 1	GOI; 2	INT; 1				NC†	0†
2021	Eurofarma RC	Chevrolet Cruze	GOI; 1	GOI; 2	INT; 1; 9	INT; 2; 1	VCA; 1	VCA; 2	VCA; 1	VCA; 2	CAS; 1	CAS; 2	CUR; 1	CUR; 2	CUR; 1	CUR; 2	SCZ; 1	SCZ; 2	VCA; 1	VCA; 2	VCA; 1	VCA; 2	GOI; 1	GOI; 2	INT; 1	INT; 2	NC†	0†

^{†} As da Costa was a guest driver, he was ineligible for points.

=== Complete Blancpain GT Series Sprint Cup results ===
Year	Team	Car	Class	1	2	3	4	5	6	7	8	9	10	Pos	Points
2017	Rowe Racing	BMW M6 GT3	Pro	MIS; QR	MIS; CR	BRH; QR; 5	BRH; CR; Ret	ZOL; QR; 14	ZOL; CR; Ret	HUN; QR	HUN; CR	NÜR; QR; 7	NÜR; CR; 11	26th	2

=== Complete FIA World Endurance Championship results ===
(key) (Races in bold indicate pole position; races in italics indicate fastest lap)

Year	Entrant	Class	Chassis	Engine	1	2	3	4	5	6	7	8	Rank	Points
2018–19	BMW Team MTEK	LMGTE Pro	BMW M8 GTE	BMW S63 4.0 L Turbo V8	SPA; 5	LMS; Ret	SIL; Ret	FUJ; 2	SHA; 10	SEB; 7	SPA; 4	LMS; 6	10th	61
2019–20	Jota Sport	LMP2	Oreca 07	Gibson GK428 4.2 L V8	SIL; 5	FUJ; DSQ	SHA; 1	BHR; 2	COA; 3	SPA; 4	LMS; 2	BHR; 2	3rd	152
2021	Jota Sport	LMP2	Oreca 07	Gibson GK428 4.2 L V8	SPA; 2	ALG; 1	MNZ; Ret	**LMS**; 4	BHR; 3	BHR; 2			3rd	123
2022	Jota Sport	LMP2	Oreca 07	Gibson GK428 4.2 L V8	SEB; 6	SPA; 3	LMS; 1	MNZ; 2	**FUJ**; 2	BHR; 3			1st	137
2023	Hertz Team Jota	Hypercar	Porsche 963	Porsche 4.6 L Turbo V8	SEB	ALG	SPA; 6	LMS; 10	MNZ; 9	FUJ; 6	BHR; 4		9th	38
2026	Alpine Endurance Team	Hypercar	Alpine A424	Alpine V634 3.4 L Turbo V6	IMO; 4	SPA; 12	LMS; 6	SÃO; 10	COA; 3	FUJ	CAT	MNZ	15th	44

=== Complete 24 Hours of Le Mans results ===
Year	Team	Co-Drivers	Car	Class	Laps	Pos.	Class Pos.
2018	(Germany) BMW Team MTEK	(United Kingdom) Alexander Sims (Brazil) Augusto Farfus	BMW M8 GTE	GTE; Pro	223	DNF	DNF
2019	(Germany) BMW Team MTEK	(Brazil) Augusto Farfus (Finland) Jesse Krohn	BMW M8 GTE	GTE; Pro	335	30th	10th
2020	(United Kingdom) Jota Sport	(United Kingdom) Anthony Davidson (Mexico) Roberto González	Oreca 07-Gibson	LMP2	370	6th	**2nd**
2021	(United Kingdom) Jota Sport	(United Kingdom) Anthony Davidson (Mexico) Roberto González	Oreca 07-Gibson	LMP2	358	13th	8th
2022	(United Kingdom) Jota Sport	(Mexico) Roberto González (United Kingdom) Will Stevens	Oreca 07-Gibson	LMP2	369	5th	**1st**
2023	(United Kingdom) Hertz Team Jota	(United Kingdom) Will Stevens (China) Yifei Ye	Porsche 963	Hypercar	244	40th	13th
2025	(Italy) AF Corse	(France) François Perrodo (France) Matthieu Vaxivière	Oreca 07-Gibson	LMP2	364	26th	9th
2025	(Italy) AF Corse	(France) François Perrodo (France) Matthieu Vaxivière	Oreca 07-Gibson	LMP2 Pro-Am	364	26th	4th
2026	(France) Alpine Endurance Team	(Austria) Ferdinand Habsburg (France) Charles Milesi	Alpine A424	Hypercar	381	6th	6th

=== Complete IMSA SportsCar Championship results ===
(key) (Races in bold indicate pole position; results in italics indicate fastest lap)

Year	Entrant	Class	Make	Engine	1	2	3	4	5	6	7	Rank	Points
2025	Inter Europol Competition	LMP2	Oreca 07	Gibson GK428 4.2 L V8	DAY; 10	SEB	WGL	MOS	ELK	IMS	PET	56th	231
2026	Inter Europol Competition	LMP2	Oreca 07	Gibson GK428 4.2 L V8	**DAY**; 2	SEB	WGL	MOS	ELK	IMS	PET	32nd	355

== Distinctions ==
=== National orders ===
- Commander of the Order of Merit (3 September 2020)

== See also ==
- 2018–19 Formula E season

Sporting positions
Preceded by Valtteri Bottas	Formula Renault 2.0 NEC; Champion; 2009	Succeeded by Ludwig Ghidi
Preceded by Daniel Juncadella	Macau Grand Prix; Winner; 2012	Succeeded by Alex Lynn
Preceded by Felix Rosenqvist	Macau Grand Prix; Winner; 2016	Succeeded by Dan Ticktum
Preceded by Jean-Éric Vergne	Formula E Champion; 2019–20	Succeeded by Nyck de Vries
Preceded by Robin Frijns; Ferdinand Habsburg; Charles Milesi	FIA Endurance Trophy for LMP2 Drivers; 2022; With: Will Stevens & Roberto González	Succeeded by Robert Kubica; Louis Delétraz; Rui Andrade
