= FIA Formula 3 International Trophy =

Former Single-Seater Racing Series

- Category: Single seaters
- Country: International
- Inaugural season: 2011
- Folded: 2011
- Last Drivers' champion: (Spain) Roberto Merhi

The FIA Formula 3 International Trophy was a FIA-sanctioned international formula series that ran in 2011 for Formula Three cars. The Trophy was the first international Formula Three series since the demise of the European Formula Three Championship in 1984, and was created to increase the appeal of the category, which had seen the various F3 championships suffer from falling grid sizes.

The trophy comprised three existing events for Formula Three cars, the Pau Grand Prix, Masters of Formula 3 and Macau Grand Prix, and one event from both the British F3 and Formula 3 Euro Series. Drivers registered in any of the national F3 series were eligible to enter the contest, and they competed alongside the drivers entered into the individual events.

After one season, which was won by Spanish driver Roberto Merhi, the Trophy was replaced by the FIA Formula 3 European Championship for 2012.

== Season summary ==
The series began at Hockenheim on 30 April, and finished on 20 November at the Guia Circuit after five meetings. Roberto Merhi was crowned champion after Masters of F3 meeting at Zandvoort. German driver Marco Wittmann finished as runner-up despite driving as guest driver in the first meeting of the season, in Hockenheim. If he had participated as championship driver in these meeting, he would have been crowned champion, because he scored 36 points in these meeting(which did not count for the championship) and he finished 32-point away from Roberto Merhi. Spaniard Daniel Juncadella finished in third place after winning Macau Grand Prix.

== Teams and drivers ==
Four teams registered for the championships; Prema Powerteam, Signature and Motopark Academy from the Formula 3 Euro Series and Carlin from British Formula 3. Guest entries were allowed; all raced in one or two European rounds and/or Macau.

Team	Driver	Chassis	Engine	Rounds
Registered entries
(United Kingdom) Carlin	(Colombia) Carlos Huertas	Dallara F308	Volkswagen	All
(United Kingdom) Carlin	(Malaysia) Jazeman Jaafar	Dallara F308	Volkswagen	All
(Germany) Motopark Academy	(Japan) Kimiya Sato	Dallara F308	Volkswagen	1–2, 4–5
(Italy) Prema Powerteam	(Spain) Daniel Juncadella	Dallara F309	Mercedes HWA	All
(Italy) Prema Powerteam	(Spain) Roberto Merhi	Dallara F308	Mercedes HWA	All
(France) Signature	(Germany) Daniel Abt	Dallara F308	Volkswagen	All
(France) Signature	(Colombia) Carlos Muñoz	Dallara F308	Volkswagen	All
(France) Signature	(Belgium) Laurens Vanthoor	Dallara F309	Volkswagen	All
(France) Signature	(Germany) Marco Wittmann	Dallara F308	Volkswagen	2–5
Guest entries, ineligible for Trophy points
(United Kingdom) Carlin	(United Kingdom) Richard Bradley	Dallara F308	Volkswagen	2
(United Kingdom) Carlin	(France) Tom Dillmann	Dallara F308	Volkswagen	1
(United Kingdom) Carlin	(United Kingdom) Jack Harvey	Dallara F308	Volkswagen	3
(United Kingdom) Carlin	(Denmark) Kevin Magnussen	Dallara F308	Volkswagen	3–5
(United Kingdom) Carlin	(Brazil) Felipe Nasr	Dallara F308	Volkswagen	3, 5
(United Kingdom) Carlin	(United Kingdom) Rupert Svendsen-Cook	Dallara F308	Volkswagen	3–4
(United Kingdom) Double R Racing	(Estonia) Marko Asmer	Dallara F308	Mercedes HWA	2–3, 5
(United Kingdom) Double R Racing	(Finland) Valtteri Bottas	Dallara F308	Mercedes HWA	5
(United Kingdom) Double R Racing	(Brazil) Luís Felipe Derani	Dallara F308	Mercedes HWA	2–3
(United Kingdom) Double R Racing	(New Zealand) Mitch Evans	Dallara F308	Mercedes HWA	5
(United Kingdom) Double R Racing	(Australia) Scott Pye	Dallara F308	Mercedes HWA	3
(United Kingdom) Fortec Motorsport	(United Kingdom) William Buller	Dallara F311	Mercedes HWA	3, 5
(United Kingdom) Fortec Motorsport	(Brazil) Lucas Foresti	Dallara F311	Mercedes HWA	3, 5
(United Kingdom) Fortec Motorsport	(Malaysia) Fahmi Ilyas	Dallara F311	Mercedes HWA	3
(United Kingdom) Fortec Motorsport	(United Kingdom) Harry Tincknell	Dallara F311	Mercedes HWA	3
(United Kingdom) Hitech Racing	(Brazil) Pietro Fantin	Dallara F308	Volkswagen	3, 5
(United Kingdom) Hitech Racing	(Portugal) António Félix da Costa	Dallara F310	Volkswagen	5
(United Kingdom) Hitech Racing	(Japan) Kotaro Sakurai	Dallara F305	Mugen-Honda	3
(United Kingdom) Hitech Racing	(Netherlands) Hannes van Asseldonk	Dallara F310	Volkswagen	5
(Switzerland) Jo Zeller Racing	(Switzerland) Sandro Zeller	Dallara F306	Mercedes HWA	1
(Germany) Motopark Academy	(France) Tom Dillmann	Dallara F308	Volkswagen	2
(Germany) Motopark Academy	(Sweden) Jimmy Eriksson	Dallara F308	Volkswagen	1, 4–5
(Germany) Motopark Academy	(Canada) Gianmarco Raimondo	Dallara F308	Volkswagen	1
(Germany) Mücke Motorsport	(Brazil) Lucas Foresti	Dallara F308	Mercedes HWA	4
(Germany) Mücke Motorsport	(Netherlands) Nigel Melker	Dallara F308	Mercedes HWA	1, 4
(Germany) Mücke Motorsport	(Sweden) Felix Rosenqvist	Dallara F308	Mercedes HWA	1, 4–5
(Germany) Mücke Motorsport	(Japan) Yuhi Sekiguchi	Dallara F308	Mercedes HWA	5
(Italy) Prema Powerteam	(Italy) Raffaele Marciello	Dallara F308	Mercedes HWA	3
(Italy) Prema Powerteam	(Brazil) Luís Felipe Derani	Dallara F308	Mercedes HWA	4
(France) Signature	(Spain) Carlos Sainz Jr.	Dallara F309	Volkswagen	5
(France) Signature	(Germany) Marco Wittmann	Dallara F308	Volkswagen	1
(United Kingdom) Sino Vision Racing	(China) Adderly Fong	Dallara F308	Mercedes HWA	3, 5
(United Kingdom) Sino Vision Racing	(United Kingdom) Hywel Lloyd	Dallara F308	Mercedes HWA	3, 5
(Germany) STAR Racing Team	(Poland) Kuba Giermaziak	Dallara F308	Volkswagen	1
(Japan) ThreeBond Racing	(Japan) Hironobu Yasuda	Dallara F309	Nissan	5
(Japan) Toda Racing	(Japan) Hideki Yamauchi	Dallara F308	Honda	5
(Japan) TOM'S	(United Kingdom) Richard Bradley	Dallara F308	Toyota	5
(Japan) TOM'S	(United Kingdom) Alexander Sims	Dallara F308	Toyota	5
(United Kingdom) T-Sport	(Brazil) Yann Cunha	Dallara F311	Volkswagen	3
(United Kingdom) T-Sport	(Netherlands) Bart Hylkema	Dallara F311	Volkswagen	3
(United Kingdom) T-Sport	(Bahrain) Menasheh Idafar	Dallara F311	Volkswagen	3
(Netherlands) Van Amersfoort Racing	(New Zealand) Richie Stanaway	Dallara F308	Volkswagen	5
(Netherlands) Van Amersfoort Racing	(Netherlands) Hannes van Asseldonk	Dallara F308	Volkswagen	3

== Race calendar ==
The provisional six-round calendar included the Korea Super Prix, but this was cancelled three weeks before the event.

Round		Circuit	Date	Pole position	Fastest lap	Winning driver	Winning team	Event
1	R1	(Germany) Hockenheimring	30 April	(Spain) Roberto Merhi	(Spain) Roberto Merhi	(Spain) Roberto Merhi	(Italy) Prema Powerteam	F3 Euro Series
1	R2	(Germany) Hockenheimring	1 May	(Germany) Marco Wittmann	(Spain) Roberto Merhi	(Spain) Roberto Merhi	(Italy) Prema Powerteam	F3 Euro Series
2		(France) Pau Circuit	22 May	(Germany) Marco Wittmann	(Germany) Marco Wittmann	(Germany) Marco Wittmann	(France) Signature	Pau Grand Prix
3	R1	(Belgium) Circuit de Spa-Francorchamps	29 July	(Spain) Roberto Merhi	(Spain) Roberto Merhi	(Spain) Roberto Merhi	(Italy) Prema Powerteam	Spa 24 Hours/British F3
3	R2	(Belgium) Circuit de Spa-Francorchamps	30 July	(Spain) Roberto Merhi	(Spain) Roberto Merhi	(Spain) Roberto Merhi	(Italy) Prema Powerteam	Spa 24 Hours/British F3
4		(Netherlands) Circuit Park Zandvoort	14 August	(Spain) Roberto Merhi	(Sweden) Felix Rosenqvist	(Sweden) Felix Rosenqvist	(Germany) Mücke Motorsport	Masters of Formula 3
5	R1	(Macau) Guia Circuit	19 November	(Germany) Marco Wittmann	(Spain) Roberto Merhi	(Germany) Marco Wittmann	(France) Signature	Macau Grand Prix
5	R2	(Macau) Guia Circuit	20 November	(Germany) Marco Wittmann	(Germany) Marco Wittmann	(Spain) Daniel Juncadella	(Italy) Prema Powerteam	Macau Grand Prix

== Results ==
The F3 International Trophy took on the same scoring system used in Formula One and other FIA Championships, with points awarded to the top ten finishers.

Position	**1st**	**2nd**	**3rd**	**4th**	**5th**	**6th**	**7th**	**8th**	**9th**	**10th**
Points	25	18	15	12	10	8	6	4	2	1

Pos	Driver	HOC (Germany)		PAU (France)	SPA (Belgium)		ZAN (Netherlands)	MAC (Macau)		Points
1	(Spain) Roberto Merhi	**1**	1	2	**1**	**1**	**DSQ**	3	Ret	133
2	(Germany) Marco Wittmann	2	**2**	**1**	11	2	2	**1**	**3**	101
3	(Spain) Daniel Juncadella	6	4	3	8	Ret	Ret	6	1	72
4	(Germany) Daniel Abt	4	6	4	14	13	6	8	Ret	44
5	(Belgium) Laurens Vanthoor	3	15	Ret	17	4	7	7	Ret	39
6	(Colombia) Carlos Muñoz	8	9	5	4	Ret	Ret	Ret	Ret	28
7	(Malaysia) Jazeman Jaafar	10	11	11	3	12	10	17	8	21
8	(Colombia) Carlos Huertas	11	12	9	10	9	11	5	13	15
9	(Japan) Kimiya Sato	Ret	10	8			12	9	12	7
Guest drivers ineligible for points
	(Sweden) Felix Rosenqvist	5	3				1	21	Ret	0
	(Brazil) Felipe Nasr				9	7		2	2	0
	(United Kingdom) William Buller				2	3		13	6	0
	(Denmark) Kevin Magnussen				7	8	3	19	14	0
	(Netherlands) Nigel Melker	7	5				4			0
	(Japan) Yuhi Sekiguchi							12	4	0
	(Finland) Valtteri Bottas							4	Ret	0
	(United Kingdom) Rupert Svendsen-Cook				6	14	5			0
	(Netherlands) Hannes van Asseldonk				12	Ret		10	5	0
	(United Kingdom) Jack Harvey				5	10				0
	(Italy) Raffaele Marciello				Ret	5				0
	(Estonia) Marko Asmer			7	Ret	6		18	19	0
	(Brazil) Luís Felipe Derani			6	18	Ret	Ret			0
	(Brazil) Lucas Foresti				13	11	8	14	7	0
	(Sweden) Jimmy Eriksson	9	7				9	Ret	DNS	0
	(France) Tom Dillmann	12	8	Ret						0
	(United Kingdom) Richard Bradley			10				Ret	9	0
	(China) Adderly Fong				21	22		Ret	10	0
	(Japan) Hideki Yamauchi							11	15	0
	(Brazil) Pietro Fantin				19	DSQ		Ret	11	0
	(Switzerland) Sandro Zeller	13	13							0
	(Poland) Kuba Giermaziak	14	Ret							0
	(Canada) Gianmarco Raimondo	Ret	14							0
	(United Kingdom) Hywel Lloyd				15	Ret		16	16	0
	(Australia) Scott Pye				16	15				0
	(New Zealand) Richie Stanaway							15	Ret	0
	(United Kingdom) Harry Tincknell				22	16				0
	(Spain) Carlos Sainz Jr.							20	17	0
	(Netherlands) Bart Hylkema				Ret	17				0
	(Malaysia) Fahmi Ilyas				20	18				0
	(United Kingdom) Alexander Sims							DNS	18	0
	(Bahrain) Menasheh Idafar				Ret	19				0
	(Brazil) Yann Cunha				23	20				0
	(Japan) Kotaro Sakurai				24	21				0
	(New Zealand) Mitch Evans							22	Ret	0
	(Portugal) António Félix da Costa							Ret	Ret	0
	(Japan) Hironobu Yasuda							Ret	Ret	0
Pos	Driver	HOC (Germany)		PAU (France)	SPA (Belgium)		ZAN (Netherlands)	MAC (Macau)		Points

Colour	Result
Gold	Winner
Silver	Second place
Bronze	Third place
Green	Points classification
Blue	Non-points classification
Blue	Non-classified finish (NC)
Purple	Retired, not classified (Ret)
Red	Did not qualify (DNQ)
Red	Did not pre-qualify (DNPQ)
Black	Disqualified (DSQ)
White	Did not start (DNS)
White	Withdrew (WD)
White	Race cancelled (C)
Blank	Did not practice (DNP)
Blank	Did not arrive (DNA)
Blank	Excluded (EX)

**Bold** – Pole
Italics – Fastest Lap

== See also ==
- Formula Three
- FIA European Formula Three Championship
- Formula Three Euroseries
