= 2011 Masters of Formula 3 =

Race details
Date	14 August 2011
Official name	Masters of Formula 3
Location	Circuit Park Zandvoort, Netherlands
Course	4.307 km (2.676 mi)
Distance	25 laps, 107.675 km (66.906 mi)

Pole
Driver	(Spain) Roberto Merhi	Prema Powerteam
Time	1:30.750

Fastest Lap
Driver	(Sweden) Felix Rosenqvist	Mücke Motorsport
Time	1:31.534 (on lap 6 of 25)

Podium
First	(Sweden) Felix Rosenqvist	Mücke Motorsport
Second	(Germany) Marco Wittmann	Signature
Third	(Denmark) Kevin Magnussen	Carlin

The 2011 Masters of Formula 3 was the twenty-first Masters of Formula 3 race, and was held at Circuit Park Zandvoort in the Netherlands on 14 August 2011.

The race was won by Felix Rosenqvist, for Mücke Motorsport, who took advantage of a start-line collision between Spanish Prema Powerteam teammates Daniel Juncadella and Roberto Merhi. Marco Wittmann finished second, whilst Kevin Magnussen became the first regular from the British series to appear on the podium since Adam Carroll in 2004 by finishing third.

Despite his disqualification for causing the accident with Daniel Juncadella, Roberto Merhi sealed the inaugural FIA Formula 3 International Trophy at this race on the virtue of his closest rival, Marco Wittmann, failing to win the race.

== Drivers and teams ==
2011 Entry List
Team	No	Driver	Chassis (Note: All drivers competed in Dallara chassis; model listed.)	Engine	Main series
(France) Signature	1	(Germany) Marco Wittmann	F308	Volkswagen	Formula 3 Euro Series
(France) Signature	2	(Belgium) Laurens Vanthoor	F309	Volkswagen	Formula 3 Euro Series
(France) Signature	3	(Germany) Daniel Abt	F308	Volkswagen	Formula 3 Euro Series
(France) Signature	4	(Colombia) Carlos Muñoz	F308	Volkswagen	Formula 3 Euro Series
(United Kingdom) Carlin	6	(Colombia) Carlos Huertas	F308	Volkswagen	British Formula 3
(United Kingdom) Carlin	7	(Malaysia) Jazeman Jaafar	F308	Volkswagen	British Formula 3
(United Kingdom) Carlin	8	(Denmark) Kevin Magnussen	F308	Volkswagen	British Formula 3
(United Kingdom) Carlin	9	(United Kingdom) Rupert Svendsen-Cook	F308	Volkswagen	British Formula 3
(Italy) Prema Powerteam	11	(Spain) Roberto Merhi	F308	Mercedes	Formula 3 Euro Series
(Italy) Prema Powerteam	12	(Spain) Daniel Juncadella	F309	Mercedes	Formula 3 Euro Series
(Italy) Prema Powerteam	14	(Brazil) Pipo Derani	F308	Mercedes	British Formula 3
(Germany) Mücke Motorsport	15	(Netherlands) Nigel Melker	F308	Mercedes	Formula 3 Euro Series
(Germany) Mücke Motorsport	16	(Sweden) Felix Rosenqvist	F308	Mercedes	Formula 3 Euro Series
(Germany) Mücke Motorsport	17	(Brazil) Lucas Foresti	F308	Mercedes	British Formula 3
(Germany) Motopark Academy	18	(Sweden) Jimmy Eriksson	F308	Volkswagen	Formula 3 Euro Series
(Germany) Motopark Academy	19	(Japan) Kimiya Sato	F308	Volkswagen	Formula 3 Euro Series

== Classification ==
=== Qualifying ===
Pos	No	Driver	Team	Q1	Q2
1	11	(Spain) Roberto Merhi	Prema Powerteam	1:30.750	1:48.138
2	12	(Spain) Daniel Juncadella	Prema Powerteam	1:30.758	1:49.141
3	16	(Sweden) Felix Rosenqvist	Mücke Motorsport	1:31.055	1:49.291
4	1	(Germany) Marco Wittmann	Signature	1:31.226	1:47.803
5	8	(Denmark) Kevin Magnussen	Carlin	1:31.295	1:48.648
6	15	(Netherlands) Nigel Melker	Mücke Motorsport	1:31.411	1:49.909
7	2	(Belgium) Laurens Vanthoor	Signature	1:31.530	1:49.972
8	9	(United Kingdom) Rupert Svendsen-Cook	Carlin	1:31.599	1:51.636
9	3	(Germany) Daniel Abt	Signature	1:31.914	1:48.723
10	17	(Brazil) Lucas Foresti	Mücke Motorsport	1:31.933	1:48.995
11	14	(Brazil) Pipo Derani	Prema Powerteam	1:32.096	1:51.583
12	7	(Malaysia) Jazeman Jaafar	Carlin	1:32.123	1:52.220
13	4	(Colombia) Carlos Muñoz	Signature	1:32.315	1:49.493
14	18	(Sweden) Jimmy Eriksson	Motopark Academy	1:32.526	1:51.590
15	6	(Colombia) Carlos Huertas	Carlin	1:32.529	1:53.408
16	19	(Japan) Kimiya Sato	Motopark Academy	1:32.694	1:51.742

=== Race ===
Pos	No	Driver	Team	Laps	Time/Retired	Grid
1	16	(Sweden) Felix Rosenqvist	Mücke Motorsport	25	0:42:19.994	3
2	1	(Germany) Marco Wittmann	Signature	25	+5.182	4
3	10	(Denmark) Kevin Magnussen	Carlin	25	+23.934	5
4	15	(Netherlands) Nigel Melker	Mücke Motorsport	25	+24.507	6
5	9	(United Kingdom) Rupert Svendsen-Cook	Carlin	25	+26.170	8
6	3	(Germany) Daniel Abt	Signature	25	+27.232	9
7	2	(Belgium) Laurens Vanthoor	Signature	25	+27.826	7
8	17	(Brazil) Lucas Foresti	Mücke Motorsport	25	+28.944	10
9	18	(Sweden) Jimmy Eriksson	Motopark Academy	25	+30.337	14
10	7	(Malaysia) Jazeman Jaafar	Carlin	25	+40.802	12
11	6	(Colombia) Carlos Huertas	Carlin	25	+41.923	15
12	19	(Japan) Kimiya Sato	Motopark Academy	25	+48.439	16
DSQ	11	(Spain) Roberto Merhi	Prema Powerteam	25	Disqualified	1
Ret	12	(Spain) Daniel Juncadella	Prema Powerteam	0	Retired	2
Ret	14	(Brazil) Pipo Derani	Prema Powerteam	0	Retired	11
Ret	4	(Colombia) Carlos Muñoz	Signature	0	Retired	13
Fastest lap: Felix Rosenqvist, 1:31.534, 169.392 km/h (105.255 mph) on lap 6
