= Jazeman Jaafar =

Malaysian racing driver (born 1992)

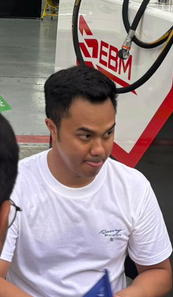
- Jazeman at the 2025 Super GT Malaysia Festival
- Nationality: Malaysian
- Born: Jazeman Firhan bin Jaafar; 13 November 1992 (age 33) Kuala Lumpur, Malaysia

Blancpain GT Series Endurance Cup career
- Debut season: 2016
- Current team: Strakka Racing
- Categorisation: FIA Gold
- Car number: 59
- Former teams: HTP Motorsports
- Starts: 10
- Wins: 1
- Poles: 1
- Fastest laps: 0
- Best finish: 2nd in 2016

Previous series
- 2010–12 2008–09 2007, 2009 2006 2013–15: British Formula 3 Formula BMW Europe; Formula BMW Pacific; Formula Renault Asia; Formula Renault 3.5

Championship titles
- 2007: Formula BMW Asia

Jazeman Firhan bin Jaafar (born 13 November 1992) is a Malaysian racing driver. He last competed in the 2025 Super GT Series.

== Career ==
=== Karting ===
Jazeman started his career at the age of six in Shah Alam, Malaysia. A hobby which turned to a full time career, Jazeman has won a total eleven karting championships in Malaysia, Asia, and also won the Belgian Open Kart Championship Race in Mariembourg.

=== Formula Renault ===
In 2006, Jazeman competed in Asian Formula Renault 2.0 for the Macanese outfit Asia Racing Team at the young age of 13. He was the youngest ever driver to be granted with an International C Licence from the Fédération Internationale de l'Automobile (FIA). He finished third in the championship, behind champion Pekka Saarinen, taking four podiums during the season.

=== Formula BMW ===
In 2007, Jazeman competed in Formula BMW Asia. Jazeman was again given a special allowance to gain an International C License from the Fédération Internationale de l'Automobile (FIA) to compete in the series when he was fourteen. Jazeman won the championship but not before the following February due to the appeal of a technical infringement.

After Round 22, and following the receipt of a post-race scrutineering report, race stewards issued a decision to exclude the cars of Jazeman and team-mate Jack Lemvard for a technical infringement of the regulations. In view of the severity of the offence and the fact that the same team had contravened the technical regulations on an earlier occasion during the season, the decision also included the exclusion of CIMB Team Qi-Meritus from the 2007 championship. The decision put Jazeman second in the drivers' classification at the end of the season, just one point behind Zahir Ali. Meritus submitted an official appeal on the disqualification of their drivers in the race and their exclusion from the team championship.

The Federation Automobile of Sport China confirmed that they received the letter of appeal from the team dated 5 November 2007. Team Qi-Meritus learned that the appeals lodged with FASC against the decisions of the stewards at Zhuhai were overturned in favour of the drivers and team. The decision meant that Jazeman was handed back the drivers' title and Qi-Meritus also won the constructors' trophy. Jazeman became the youngest ever winner in the history of Formula BMW at 14 years old.

Jazeman contested two seasons in Formula BMW Europe in seasons 2008 and 2009, driving for Holzer Rennsport and Eifelland Racing respectively; finishing fourteenth and ninth in the two seasons.

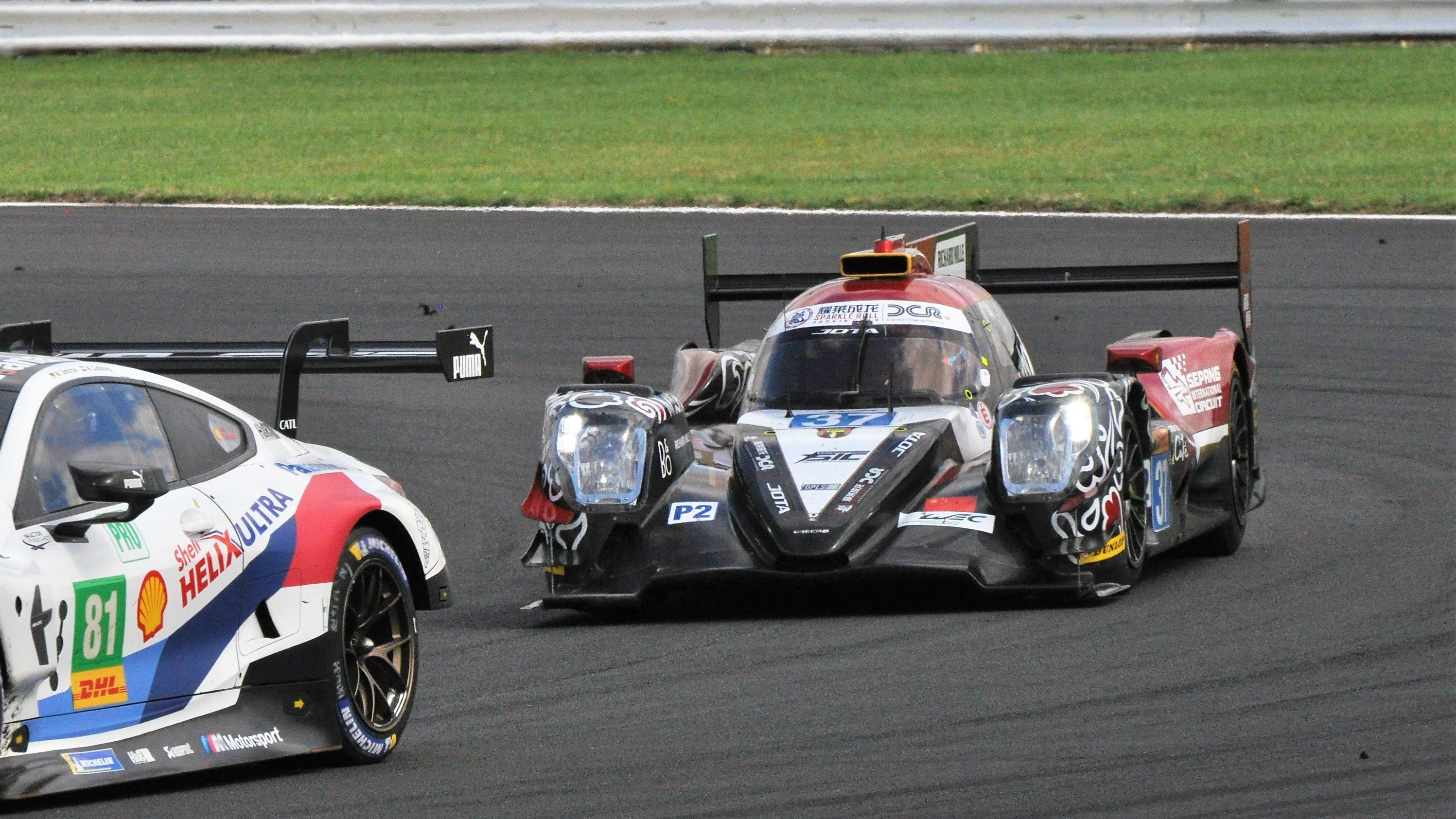
Jazeman driving in the 2018 6 Hours of Silverstone

=== Formula Three ===
Jazeman joined Carlin for the 2010 British Formula 3 International Series, making his debut in the championship after progressing through Formula BMW Europe. He remained with the team for three seasons, establishing himself as one of the leading drivers in the series.

In 2012, Jazeman finished Vice-Champion in the British Formula 3 International Series, recording two victories and multiple podium finishes. During the season, he became the first Asian driver to win the Grand Prix de Pau, one of the most prestigious events in Formula Three, and concluded the championship second overall with 306 points.

Alongside his British Formula 3 campaign, Jazeman also competed in selected rounds of the Formula 3 Euro Series, the FIA Formula 3 International Trophy, the Masters of Formula 3, and the Macau Grand Prix, before graduating to the Formula Renault 3.5 Series in 2013.

=== Formula Renault 3.5 ===
In 2013, Jazeman stepped up to the Formula Renault 3.5 Series with Carlin Motorsport after finishing runner-up in the 2012 British Formula 3 Championship. He scored his maiden series podium with a third-place finish at the Monaco round and concluded the season 17th in the championship.

Jazeman joined ISR Racing for the 2014 season, recording two further podium finishes and improving to 10th in the drivers' standings.

For 2015, he moved to Fortec Motorsports and claimed his first Formula Renault 3.5 victory in Monaco, winning from pole position. The victory briefly elevated him to the championship lead and marked the first win by a Malaysian driver in the series at the Monaco street circuit. He finished the season eighth in the championship with one win, two second-place finishes and a further podium.

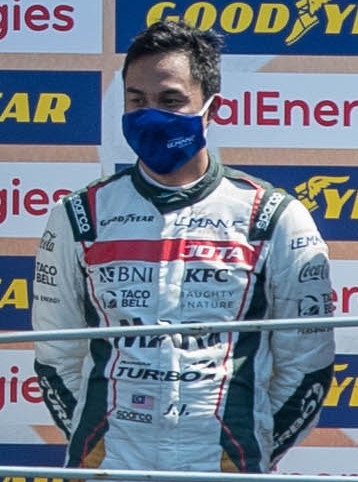
Jazeman in 2021

=== Mercedes-AMG Petronas Formula One Team – Development Driver ===
Jazeman Served as a Development Driver for the Mercedes-AMG Petronas Formula One Team, contributing to simulator development programmes (DIL 3, DIL 4 and DIL 5) and on-track testing activities. Supported vehicle development through simulator correlation, performance analysis, engineering feedback, data evaluation, race engineering collaboration, race strategy support, and media and partner engagements. During this period, he worked alongside Formula One drivers Michael Schumacher, Nico Rosberg, and Lewis Hamilton.

== Racing record ==
=== Career summary ===
Season	Series	Team name	Races	Wins	Poles	F/Laps	Podiums	Points	Position
2006	Asian Formula Renault 2.0	Asia Racing Team	12	0	0	0	4	182	**3rd**
2007	Formula BMW Asia	CIMB Qi-Meritus	22	10	0	5	16	768	**1st**
2007	Formula BMW World Final	AM-Holzer Rennsport GmbH	1	0	0	0	0	N/A	18th
2008	Formula BMW Europe	AM-Holzer Rennsport GmbH	16	0	0	0	0	67	14th
2008	Formula BMW World Final	Eifelland Racing	1	0	0	0	0	N/A	5th
2009	Formula BMW Europe	Eifelland Racing	16	0	0	2	2	123	9th
2009	Formula BMW Pacific	Räikkönen Robertson Racing	1	0	0	0	0	N/A	NC†
2010	British Formula 3 Championship	Carlin	30	0	0	0	2	85	12th
2010	Masters of Formula 3	Carlin	1	0	0	0	0	N/A	NC
2010	Macau Grand Prix	Carlin	1	0	0	0	0	N/A	14th
2011	British Formula 3 Championship	Carlin	30	0	0	0	4	187	6th
2011	FIA Formula 3 International Trophy	Carlin	8	0	0	0	1	21	7th
2011	Formula 3 Euro Series	Carlin	3	0	0	0	0	N/A	NC†
2011	Masters of Formula 3	Carlin	1	0	0	0	0	N/A	10th
2011	Macau Grand Prix	Carlin	1	0	0	0	0	N/A	8th
2012	British Formula 3 Championship	Carlin	28	3	0	3	15	306	**2nd**
2013	Formula Renault 3.5 Series	Carlin	17	0	0	0	1	24	17th
2013	British Formula 3 Championship	Carlin	3	2	2	0	3	58	9th
2014	Formula Renault 3.5 Series	ISR Racing	17	0	0	0	2	73	10th
2015	Formula Renault 3.5 Series	Fortec Motorsports	17	1	1	1	4	118	8th
2016	Blancpain GT Series Sprint Cup	HTP Motorsport	10	0	0	0	0	5	23rd
2016	Blancpain GT Series Endurance Cup	HTP Motorsport	5	1	1	0	2	67	**2nd**
2016	24H Series - A6	HTP Motorsport							
2016	Intercontinental GT Challenge	AMG - Team HTP Motorsport	1	0	0	0	0	10	13th
2017	Blancpain GT Series Endurance Cup	Strakka Racing	5	0	0	0	0	0	NC
2017	Intercontinental GT Challenge	Strakka Racing	1	0	0	0	0	0	NC
2017–18	Asian Le Mans Series - LMP2	Jackie Chan DC Racing X Jota	3	1	0	2	2	50	4th
2018	24 Hours of Le Mans - LMP2	Jackie Chan DC Racing	1	0	0	0	0	N/A	4th
2018–19	FIA World Endurance Championship - LMP2	Jackie Chan DC Racing	5	1	1	0	4	98	4th
2018–19	Asian Le Mans Series - LMP2	Jackie Chan DC Racing X Jota Sport	1	0	0	0	0	0	10th
2019	Blancpain GT World Challenge Asia - GT3	Triple Eight Race Engineering Australia	6	0	0	3	0	22	24th
2019	Blancpain GT World Challenge Asia - GT3 Pro-Am	Triple Eight Race Engineering Australia	6	0	0	3	2	59	14th
2021	FIA World Endurance Championship - LMP2	Jota Sport	Reserve and development driver						
2021	European Le Mans Series - LMP2	Jota Sport	1	0	0	0	1	0	NC†
2022	European Le Mans Series - LMP2	Team Virage	3	0	0	0	0	0	28th
2022	24 Hours of Le Mans - LMP2	Jota Sport	Reserve driver						
2022	GT World Challenge Asia - GT3	Triple Eight JMR	10	0	0	0	1	62	9th
2024	Lamborghini Super Trofeo Asia - Pro-Am	Arrows Racing	10	3	1	0	8	121	**3rd**
2024	FIA Motorsport Games GT Sprint	Team Malaysia	1	0	0	0	0	N/A	5th
2025	Super GT - GT300	EBM Giga Racing	1	0	0	0	0	0	NC*

^{†} As Jazeman was a guest driver, he was ineligible for points. ^{*} Season still in progress.

=== Complete Formula Renault 3.5 Series results ===
(key) (Races in bold indicate pole position) (Races in italics indicate fastest lap)

Year	Team	1	2	3	4	5	6	7	8	9	10	11	12	13	14	15	16	17	Pos	Points
2013	Carlin Motorsport	MNZ; 1; 7	MNZ; 2 Ret	ALC; 1; 18	ALC; 2; 12	MON; 1; 3	SPA; 1; 9	SPA; 2; 19†	MSC; 1 Ret	MSC; 2; 13	RBR; 1; 10	RBR; 2; 13	HUN; 1; 20	HUN; 2; 20	LEC; 1; 14	LEC; 2; 14	CAT; 1	CAT; 2	17th	24
2014	ISR Racing	MNZ; 1 Ret	MNZ; 2; 7	ALC; 1; 13	ALC; 2; 9	MON; 1; 3	SPA; 1; 3	SPA; 2; 6	MSC; 1; 5	MSC; 2; 12	NÜR; 1; 15	NÜR; 2; 9	HUN; 1; 10	HUN; 2; 8	LEC; 1 Ret	LEC; 2; 5	JER; 1; 14	JER; 2 Ret	10th	73
2015	Fortec Motorsports	ALC; 1; 2	ALC; 2; 7	**MON**; **1**; 1	SPA; 1; 2	SPA; 2; 6	HUN; 1; 18	HUN; 2; 4	RBR; 1; 10	RBR; 2; 9	SIL; 1; 10	SIL; 2 Ret	NÜR; 1; 3	NÜR; 2; 17	BUG; 1; 13	BUG; 2; 14	JER; 1; 6	JER; 2; 8	8th	118

=== Complete Blancpain GT Series Sprint Cup results ===
Year	Team	Car	Class	1	2	3	4	5	6	7	8	9	10	Pos.	Points
2016	HTP Motorsport	Mercedes-AMG GT3	Pro	MIS; QR; DNS	MIS; CR; 19	BRH; QR; 4	BRH; CR; 19	NÜR; QR; 14	NÜR; CR; 23	HUN; QR; 19	HUN; CR; 12	CAT; QR; 20	CAT; CR; 9	23rd	5

=== Complete FIA World Endurance Championship results ===
(key) (Races in bold indicate pole position; races in italics indicate fastest lap)

Year	Entrant	Class	Chassis	Engine	1	2	3	4	5	6	7	8	Rank	Points
2018–19	Jackie Chan DC Racing	LMP2	Oreca 07	Gibson GK428 4.2 L V8	SPA; 3	LMS; 2	**SIL**; 2	FUJ; 1	SHA; 4	SEB	SPA	LMS	4th	98

=== 24 Hours of Le Mans results ===
Year	Team	Co-Drivers	Car	Class	Laps	Pos.	Class Pos.
2018	(China) Jackie Chan DC Racing	(Malaysia) Nabil Jeffri (Malaysia) Weiron Tan	Oreca 07-Gibson	LMP2	361	8th	4th

=== Complete European Le Mans Series results ===
(key) (Races in bold indicate pole position; results in italics indicate fastest lap)

Year	Entrant	Class	Chassis	Engine	1	2	3	4	5	6	Rank	Points
2021	Jota Sport	LMP2	Oreca 07	Gibson GK428 4.2 L V8	CAT	RBR	LEC	MNZ; 3	SPA	ALG	NC†	0†
2022	Team Virage	LMP2	Oreca 07	Gibson GK428 4.2 L V8	LEC; 15	IMO; Ret	MNZ; 15	CAT	SPA	ALG	28th	0

^{†} As Jazeman was a guest driver, he was ineligible to score points.

=== Complete Super GT results ===
(key) (Races in bold indicate pole position; races in italics indicate fastest lap)

Year	Team	Car	Class	1	2	3	4	5	6	7	8	9	DC	Points
2025	EBM GIGA Racing	Aston Martin Vantage AMR GT3 Evo	GT300	OKA	FUJ	SEP; 19	FS1	FS2	SUZ	SUG	AUT	MOT	NC	0

== Personal life ==
Jazeman resides in Malaysia and his hobbies are training and reading, while his idol is Ayrton Senna.

Sporting positions
Preceded by Earl Bamber	Formula BMW Asia; Champion; 2007	Succeeded by Ross Jamison (Formula BMW Pacific)
