= Nigel Melker =

Dutch racing driver

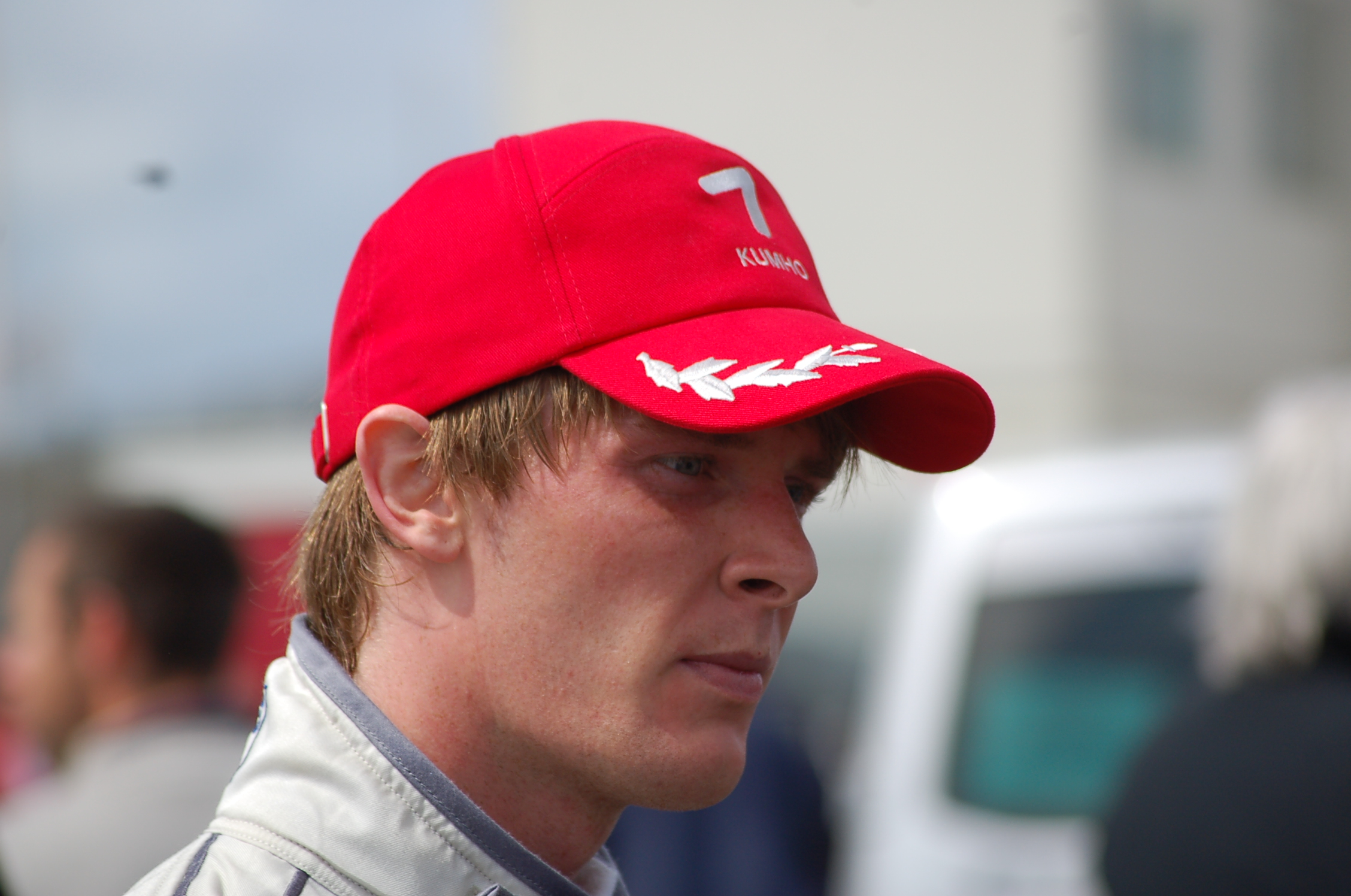
- Melker at Circuit Zandvoort in 2011
- Nationality: (Netherlands) Dutch
- Born: 25 January 1991 (age 35) Rotterdam, Netherlands

Formula Renault 3.5 Series career
- Debut season: 2012
- Current team: Tech 1 Racing
- Car number: 2
- Former teams: Lotus
- Starts: 19
- Wins: 0
- Poles: 0
- Fastest laps: 2
- Best finish: 6th in 2013

Previous series
- 2016 2014 2013 2012 2011 2010–11 2009 2008–09 2008: Supercar Challenge; Formula Acceleration 1 Formula Renault 3.5 Series; GP2 Series; Formula 3 Euro Series; GP3 Series; Eurocup Formula Renault 2.0; Formula Renault 2.0 NEC; Formula Renault 2.0 Italy

Championship titles
- 2014: Formula Acceleration 1

Nigel Melker (born 25 January 1991) is a Dutch former racing driver.

== Career ==
=== Karting ===
Melker was born in Rotterdam. He began his motorsport career in karting in 2001, winning in the Dutch Mini Junior Cup. In 2005, he won the German Junior championship and finishing as runner-up in the European ICA Junior championship.

=== Formula Renault ===
After sitting out the 2007 season, Melker moved up to single-seaters in 2008. He participated in the Formula Renault 2.0 Northern European Cup with Van Amersfoort Racing. He finished in twelfth place in the standings with eleven point-scoring positions that gave him 120 points. He also took part in ten races of the Italian Formula Renault Championship. He finished eighteenth with 37 points.

The following season, Melker competed in both the Formula Renault 2.0 Northern European Cup and Eurocup Formula Renault 2.0 championships with MP Motorsport. He finished eighteenth in the NEC standings, taking points in all six races he contested. In the Eurocup, he took part in the first five rounds, finishing 23rd with five points for sixth place at Spa.

=== GP3 Series ===
In 2010, Melker became the first driver to join RSC Mücke Motorsport for the 2010 GP3 Series season. His team-mates were compatriot Renger van der Zande and German Tobias Hegewald. He started the season by taking the first pole position of his open-wheel racing career in the opening round at Barcelona, but in the race, he was involved in an accident on the opening lap and retired. In the sprint race, he started from the back and rose to fourteenth place. He took another pole in Turkey, but did not finish in the points until the final race of the season at Monza, restricting him to 23rd place in the championships.

Melker remained in GP3 with the Mücke team for the 2011 season, alongside Michael Christensen and Luciano Bacheta (who was later replaced by Daniel Mancinelli). With the benefit of a year's experience in the category, his form was much stronger and he won the first race of the season in Turkey. This gave him the early championship lead, and he took a further four podium finishes, but he ultimately slipped to third place behind the Lotus ART duo of Valtteri Bottas and James Calado after his team appeared to lose its competitive edge following mid-season testing at Barcelona.

=== Formula 3 Euro Series ===
As well as his 2011 GP3 campaign, Melker competed in the season's Formula 3 Euro Series, also with Mücke, finishing in fourth position in the drivers' standings with four wins. He finished ahead of his team-mates Felix Rosenqvist, Marco Sørensen and Facu Regalia, but was unable to consistently challenge dominant champion Roberto Merhi, his Prema Powerteam colleague Daniel Juncadella, or Signature driver Marco Wittmann.

=== GP2 Series ===
After participating in the non-championship 2011 GP2 Final with DAMS, Melker switched to Ocean Racing Technology for the 2012 season, initially alongside Jon Lancaster. With a best race finish of fourth at Silverstone, he ended the season 19th in the championship.

=== Formula Renault 3.5 Series ===
Melker made his racing début in a Formula Renault 3.5 car at Silverstone 2012, replacing César Ramos at the Lotus team. He qualified a respectable 14th for the first race and went on to take a podium at his first race at a wet racing track, finishing 3rd. He retired in the second race and was replaced by Estonian Kevin Korjus for the remainder of the season. He was the only driver in Lotus car No. 11 to get a podium that year.

After a disappointing season in GP2, Melker went to Formula Renault 3.5 full-time for 2013, driving for previous year's team champions Tech 1 Racing alongside series veteran Mikhail Aleshin. Melker spent most of the season in the subtop of the championship, amassing four podiums and 136 points, as well as posting two fastest laps. His best weekend of the season was at the Red Bull Ring when he was runner-up twice behind dominant winner Marco Sørensen. He finished the season in sixth place.

=== Formula Acceleration 1 ===
Unable to find a drive in Formula Renault 3.5 for 2014, Melker turned his attention elsewhere. He signed with Azerti Motorsport for the inaugural Formula Acceleration 1 season. He was competitive immediately, finishing second twice at the opening round in Portugal, before taking a double victory at Circuito de Navarra. He went on to win the drivers' championship after a victory at the Nürburgring and a double victory at Assen.

== Racing record ==
=== Career summary ===
Season	Series	Team	Races	Wins	Poles	F/Laps	Podiums	Points	Position
2008	Formula Renault 2.0 NEC	Van Amersfoort Racing	15	0	0	0	0	120	12th
2008	Formula Renault 2.0 Italy	Van Amersfoort Racing	10	0	0	0	0	37	18th
2009	Formula Renault 2.0 Eurocup	MP Motorsport	10	0	0	0	0	5	23rd
2009	Formula Renault 2.0 NEC	MP Motorsport	6	0	0	0	0	77	18th
2010	GP3 Series	RSC Mücke Motorsport	16	0	2	0	0	5	23rd
2010	ATS F3 Cup	Jo Zeller Racing	2	0	0	0	0	0	NC†
2010	Masters of Formula 3	Mücke Motorsport	1	0	0	0	0	N/A	14th
2011	GP3 Series	RSC Mücke Motorsport	16	1	0	2	5	38	**3rd**
2011	Formula 3 Euro Series	Mücke Motorsport	24	4	2	2	9	251	4th
2011	Masters of Formula 3	Mücke Motorsport	1	0	0	0	0	N/A	4th
2011	GP2 Final	DAMS	2	0	0	0	0	0	20th
2012	GP2 Series	Ocean Racing Technology	24	0	0	0	0	25	19th
2012	Formula Renault 3.5 Series	Lotus	2	0	0	0	1	15	19th
2013	Formula Renault 3.5 Series	Tech 1 Racing	17	0	0	2	4	136	6th
2014	Formula Acceleration 1	Acceleration Team Netherlands	10	5	4	3	9	183	**1st**
2016	Supercar Challenge – Super GT	DayVTec	2	2	2	2	0	0	NC†
2016	Supercar Challenge – Superlights 1	DayVTec	4	3	2	4	4	84	**3rd**

† – As Melker was a guest driver, he was ineligible for points.

=== Complete Formula Renault 2.0 NEC results ===
(key) (Races in bold indicate pole position) (Races in italics indicate fastest lap)

Year	Entrant	1	2	3	4	5	6	7	8	9	10	11	12	13	14	15	16	DC	Points
2008	Van Amersfoort Racing	HOC; 1 DNS	HOC; 2 Ret	ZAN; 1; 10	ZAN; 2; 22	ALA; 1 Ret	ALA; 2; 8	OSC; 1; 12	OSC; 2; 6	ASS; 1; 14	ASS; 2 Ret	ZOL; 1; 10	ZOL; 2; 9	NÜR; 1; 8	NÜR; 2; 8	SPA; 1; 11	SPA; 2; 15	12th	120
2009	MP Motorsport	ZAN; 1; 5	ZAN; 2; 16	HOC; 1; 13	HOC; 2; 5	ALA; 1	ALA; 2	OSC; 1; 5	OSC; 2; 5	ASS; 1	ASS; 2	MST; 1	MST; 2	NÜR; 1	NÜR; 2	SPA; 1	SPA; 2	18th	77

=== Complete Eurocup Formula Renault 2.0 results ===
(key) (Races in bold indicate pole position; races in italics indicate fastest lap)

Year	Entrant	1	2	3	4	5	6	7	8	9	10	11	12	13	14	DC	Points
2009	MP Motorsport	CAT; 1; 15	CAT; 2; 16	SPA; 1; 6	SPA; 2 Ret	HUN; 1; 22†	HUN; 2; 18	SIL; 1 Ret	SIL; 2; 12	LMS; 1 Ret	LMS; 2 Ret	NÜR; 1	NÜR; 2	ALC; 1	ALC; 2	23rd	5

=== Complete GP3 Series results ===
(key) (Races in bold indicate pole position) (Races in italics indicate fastest lap)

Year	Entrant	1	2	3	4	5	6	7	8	9	10	11	12	13	14	15	16	DC	Points
2010	RSC Mücke Motorsport	**CAT**; **FEA**; Ret	CAT; SPR; 14	**IST**; **FEA**; 23	IST; SPR; 17	VAL; FEA; Ret	VAL; SPR; 15	SIL; FEA; 12	SIL; SPR; Ret	HOC; FEA; Ret	HOC; SPR; Ret	HUN; FEA; 23	HUN; SPR; 14	SPA; FEA; 12	SPA; SPR; 15	MNZ; FEA; 8	MNZ; SPR; 13	23rd	5
2011	RSC Mücke Motorsport	IST; FEA; 1	IST; SPR; 3	CAT; FEA; 6	CAT; SPR; 2	VAL; FEA; Ret	VAL; SPR; 19	SIL; FEA; Ret	SIL; SPR; 8	NÜR; FEA; 10	NÜR; SPR; 3	HUN; FEA; 8	HUN; SPR; 4	SPA; FEA; 3	SPA; SPR; Ret	MNZ; FEA; 9	MNZ; SPR; Ret	**3rd**	**38**

=== Complete Formula 3 Euro Series results ===
(key)

Year	Entrant	Engine	1	2	3	4	5	6	7	8	9	10	11	12	13	14	15	16	17	18	19	20	21	22	23	24	25	26	27	DC	Points
2011	Mücke Motorsport	Mercedes	LEC; 1; 1	LEC; 2; 12	LEC; 3; 4	HOC; 1; 7	HOC; 2; 11	HOC; 3; 5	**ZAN**; **1**; 1	ZAN; 2; 11	ZAN; 3; 3	RBR; 1; 5	RBR; 2 Ret	RBR; 3; 2	NOR; 1; 1	NOR; 2; 11	NOR; 3; 10	NÜR; 1; 4	NÜR; 2; 6	NÜR; 3; 3	SIL; 1	SIL; 2	SIL; 3	**VAL**; **1**; 1	VAL; 2; 8	VAL; 3; 3	HOC; 1; 6	HOC; 2; 5	HOC; 3; 2	4th	251

=== Complete GP2 Series results ===
(key) (Races in bold indicate pole position) (Races in italics indicate fastest lap)

Year	Entrant	1	2	3	4	5	6	7	8	9	10	11	12	13	14	15	16	17	18	19	20	21	22	23	24	DC	Points
2012	Ocean Racing Technology	SEP; FEA; 16	SEP; SPR; 14	BHR1; FEA; 20	BHR1; SPR; 18	BHR2; FEA; 19	BHR2; SPR; 11	CAT; FEA; 14	CAT; SPR; 24	MON; FEA; Ret	MON; SPR; 12	VAL; FEA; Ret	VAL; SPR; 13	SIL; FEA; 4	SIL; SPR; 6	HOC; FEA; 6	HOC; SPR; 8	HUN; FEA; 14	HUN; SPR; 18	SPA; FEA; Ret	SPA; SPR; DNS	MNZ; FEA; 11	MNZ; SPR; Ret	MRN; FEA; 12	MRN; SPR; 12	19th	25

==== Complete GP2 Final results ====
(key) (Races in bold indicate pole position) (Races in italics indicate fastest lap)

Year	Entrant	1	2	DC	Points
2011	DAMS	YMC; FEA; 15	YMC; SPR; 20	20th	0

=== Complete Formula Renault 3.5 Series results ===
(key) (Races in bold indicate pole position) (Races in italics indicate fastest lap)

Year	Team	1	2	3	4	5	6	7	8	9	10	11	12	13	14	15	16	17	Pos	Points
2012	Lotus	ALC; 1	ALC; 2	MON; 1	SPA; 1	SPA; 2	NÜR; 1	NÜR; 2	MSC; 1	MSC; 2	SIL; 1; 3	SIL; 2 Ret	HUN; 1	HUN; 2	LEC; 1	LEC; 2	CAT; 1	CAT; 2	19th	15
2013	Tech 1 Racing	MNZ; 1; 5	MNZ; 2; 11	ALC; 1; 6	ALC; 2; 6	MON; 1; 17	SPA; 1; 3	SPA; 2; 6	MSC; 1; 3	MSC; 2; 15	RBR; 1; 2	RBR; 2; 2	HUN; 1; 6	HUN; 2; 4	LEC; 1 Ret	LEC; 2; 4	CAT; 1 Ret	CAT; 2; 8	6th	136

=== Complete Formula Acceleration 1 results ===
(key) (Races in bold indicate pole position) (Races in italics indicate fastest lap)

Year	Team	1	2	3	4	5	6	7	8	9	10	Pos	Points
2014	Netherlands	ALG; 1; 2	ALG; 2; 2	**NAV**; **1**; 1	NAV; 2; 1	**NÜR**; **1**; 1	**NÜR**; **2** DNS	MNZ; 1; 2	MNZ; 2; 2	**ASS**; **1**; 1	ASS; 2; 1	**1st**	**183**
