= 2011 Formula 3 Euro Series =

The 2011 Formula 3 Euro Series season was the ninth championship year of the Formula 3 Euro Series. It began on 2 April at Circuit Paul Ricard and finished on 23 October at Hockenheim after 27 races at nine meetings.

Roberto Merhi, who participated his third season in series clinched title after home win at Valencia with a round to spare, bringing first Drivers' Championship for Prema Powerteam since 2003 and first title in the Teams' Standings. Second place for the second year in row went to Signature's Marco Wittmann, who took five wins. Merhi's compatriot and teammate Daniel Juncadella scored four races victories and managed third in drivers' standing. Also Juncadella and Merhi won Nations Cup.

Best rookie of the season Nigel Melker took fourth place with four victories despite missing round Silverstone due to commitments in GP3 Series. His teammate Felix Rosenqvist finished fifth, winning penultimate race of the season at Hockenheim. Places six through eight went to Signature's drivers Laurens Vanthoor, Daniel Abt and Carlos Muñoz. Motopark's drivers Jimmy Eriksson and Kimiya Sato finished on ninth and tenth positions respectively.

== Drivers and teams ==
Competition numbers 30 and higher are single-race entrants and are ineligible to score championship points.

| Team | No. | Driver | Class | Chassis (Note: All drivers competed in Dallara chassis; model listed.) | Engine | Rounds |
|---|---|---|---|---|---|---|
| (France) Signature | 1 | (Germany) Marco Wittmann | FIA | F308/011 | Volkswagen | All |
| (France) Signature | 2 | (Belgium) Laurens Vanthoor | FIA | F309/023 | Volkswagen | All |
| (France) Signature | 9 | (Colombia) Carlos Muñoz | FIA | F308/005 | Volkswagen | All |
| (France) Signature | 10 | (Germany) Daniel Abt | FIA | F308/057 | Volkswagen | All |
| (France) Signature | 38 | (Spain) Carlos Sainz Jr. | R | F309/001 | Volkswagen | 9 |
| (Germany) Mücke Motorsport | 3 | (Netherlands) Nigel Melker | R | F308/005 | Mercedes | 1–6, 8–9 |
| (Germany) Mücke Motorsport | 4 | (Sweden) Felix Rosenqvist | | F308/042 | Mercedes | All |
| (Germany) Mücke Motorsport | 35 | (Denmark) Marco Sørensen | | F308/005 | Mercedes | 7 |
| (Germany) Mücke Motorsport | 37 | (Argentina) Facu Regalia | | F308/050 | Mercedes | 9 |
| (Germany) Motopark | 5 | (Sweden) Jimmy Eriksson | | F308/099 | Volkswagen | All |
| (Germany) Motopark | 6 | (Japan) Kimiya Sato | FIA | F308/098 | Volkswagen | All |
| (Germany) Motopark | 11 | (Canada) Gianmarco Raimondo | | F308/006 | Volkswagen | 1–3 |
| (Germany) Motopark | 31 | (France) Tom Dillmann | | F308/006 | Volkswagen | 4 |
| (Germany) Motopark | 36 | (Russia) Artem Markelov | R | F308/096 | Volkswagen | 9 |
| (Italy) Prema Powerteam | 7 | (Spain) Daniel Juncadella | FIA | F309/014 | Mercedes | All |
| (Italy) Prema Powerteam | 8 | (Spain) Roberto Merhi | FIA | F308/047 | Mercedes | All |
| (Italy) Prema Powerteam | 11 | (Canada) Gianmarco Raimondo | | F308/031 | Mercedes | 4–9 |
| (Germany) STAR Racing Team | 12 | (Poland) Kuba Giermaziak | R | F308/096 | Volkswagen | 1–6 |
| (United Kingdom) Carlin | 30 | (Malaysia) Jazeman Jaafar | FIA | F308/018 | Volkswagen | 2 |
| (United Kingdom) Carlin | 31 | (France) Tom Dillmann | | F308/056 | Volkswagen | 2 |
| (United Kingdom) Carlin | 32 | (Colombia) Carlos Huertas | FIA | F308/055 | Volkswagen | 2 |
| (Austria) HS Engineering | 33 | (Israel) Alon Day | | F308/071 | Volkswagen | 5, 7 |
| (Switzerland) Jo Zeller Racing | 34 | (Switzerland) Sandro Zeller | | F308/044 | Mercedes | 2, 5, 9 |

| Icon | Legend |
|---|---|
| R | Rookie Cup |
| FIA | FIA Formula 3 International Trophy |

=== Driver changes ===
Changed Teams

- Roberto Merhi and Carlos Muñoz both switched from Mücke Motorsport to Prema Powerteam and Signature respectively.

Entering/Re-Entering Formula 3 Euro Series

- After finishing runner-up to Tom Dillmann in German Formula Three, Daniel Abt moved to Signature. Dillmann competed as a guest driver at Hockenheim for Carlin along with British series regulars Carlos Huertas and Jazeman Jaafar, and then moved to Motopark for the Red Bull Ring round.
- Alon Day made his series début as a guest driver for his German Formula Three team HS Engineering, at the Norisring.
- Jimmy Eriksson moved up from German Formula Three full-time, competing for Motopark. He was joined by Gianmarco Raimondo who moves from Italian Formula Three and Kimiya Sato, who moves from Japanese Formula Three. Raimondo later moved to a third car at Prema Powerteam
- Kuba Giermaziak débuted in the series with the STAR Racing Team, dovetailing with commitments in the Porsche Supercup.
- Nigel Melker competed for Mücke Motorsport, alongside his GP3 commitments with the team. Felix Rosenqvist joined him, stepping up from German Formula Three.

Leaving Formula 3 Euro Series

- With his ART Grand Prix team leaving the championship after the 2010 season, Valtteri Bottas moved into one of the team's GP3 Series seats, while his 2010 teammate Alexander Sims join edStatus Grand Prix.
- 2010 champion Edoardo Mortara moved into the Deutsche Tourenwagen Masters with Audi.

=== Team changes ===
- ART Grand Prix, who won six drivers' titles and seven teams' titles, exited the championship to concentrate on other series.
- STAR Racing Team débuted in the series, with Kuba Giermaziak driving the team's sole entry.

== Race calendar and results ==
- A provisional nine-round calendar was announced on 16 October 2010. Seven of the nine rounds will support Deutsche Tourenwagen Masters events, with additional rounds at Le Castellet and Silverstone in support of the Le Mans Series. The series will adopt a format introduced in the 2010 British Formula 3 Championship, with three races a weekend, two of which held on the Saturday and the final race on the Sunday. The first and third races at the first Hockenheim round were also points-scoring for the FIA Formula 3 International Trophy.

| Round | | Circuit | Date | Pole position | Fastest lap | Winning driver | Winning team |
|---|---|---|---|---|---|---|---|
| 1 | R1 | (France) Circuit Paul Ricard, Le Castellet | 2 April | (Spain) Roberto Merhi | (Germany) Marco Wittmann | (Netherlands) Nigel Melker | (Germany) Mücke Motorsport |
| 1 | R2 | (France) Circuit Paul Ricard, Le Castellet | 2 April | | (Spain) Daniel Juncadella | (Spain) Roberto Merhi | (Italy) Prema Powerteam |
| 1 | R3 | (France) Circuit Paul Ricard, Le Castellet | 3 April | (Spain) Roberto Merhi | (Germany) Daniel Abt | (Spain) Daniel Juncadella | (Italy) Prema Powerteam |
| 2 | R1 | (Germany) Hockenheimring | 30 April | (Spain) Roberto Merhi | (Spain) Roberto Merhi | (Spain) Roberto Merhi | (Italy) Prema Powerteam |
| 2 | R2 | (Germany) Hockenheimring | 30 April | | (Spain) Roberto Merhi | (Spain) Daniel Juncadella | (Italy) Prema Powerteam |
| 2 | R3 | (Germany) Hockenheimring | 1 May | (Germany) Marco Wittmann | (Spain) Roberto Merhi | (Spain) Roberto Merhi | (Italy) Prema Powerteam |
| 3 | R1 | (Netherlands) Circuit Park Zandvoort | 14 May | (Netherlands) Nigel Melker | (Germany) Marco Wittmann | (Netherlands) Nigel Melker | (Germany) Mücke Motorsport |
| 3 | R2 | (Netherlands) Circuit Park Zandvoort | 14 May | | (Sweden) Felix Rosenqvist | (Japan) Kimiya Sato | (Germany) Motopark |
| 3 | R3 | (Netherlands) Circuit Park Zandvoort | 15 May | (Germany) Marco Wittmann | (Germany) Marco Wittmann | (Germany) Marco Wittmann | (France) Signature |
| 4 | R1 | (Austria) Red Bull Ring, Spielberg | 4 June | (Spain) Daniel Juncadella | (Sweden) Felix Rosenqvist | (Spain) Roberto Merhi | (Italy) Prema Powerteam |
| 4 | R2 | (Austria) Red Bull Ring, Spielberg | 4 June | | (Spain) Roberto Merhi | (Spain) Roberto Merhi | (Italy) Prema Powerteam |
| 4 | R3 | (Austria) Red Bull Ring, Spielberg | 5 June | (Spain) Daniel Juncadella | (Netherlands) Nigel Melker | (Spain) Daniel Juncadella | (Italy) Prema Powerteam |
| 5 | R1 | (Germany) Norisring, Nuremberg | 2 July | (Germany) Marco Wittmann | (Germany) Marco Wittmann | (Netherlands) Nigel Melker | (Germany) Mücke Motorsport |
| 5 | R2 | (Germany) Norisring, Nuremberg | 2 July | | (Spain) Roberto Merhi | (Germany) Marco Wittmann | (France) Signature |
| 5 | R3 | (Germany) Norisring, Nuremberg | 3 July | (Germany) Marco Wittmann | (Spain) Roberto Merhi | (Germany) Marco Wittmann | (France) Signature |
| 6 | R1 | (Germany) Nürburgring | 6 August | (Spain) Daniel Juncadella | (Spain) Roberto Merhi | (Spain) Roberto Merhi | (Italy) Prema Powerteam |
| 6 | R2 | (Germany) Nürburgring | 6 August | | (Spain) Daniel Juncadella | (Spain) Roberto Merhi | (Italy) Prema Powerteam |
| 6 | R3 | (Germany) Nürburgring | 7 August | (Spain) Daniel Juncadella | (Spain) Daniel Juncadella | (Spain) Daniel Juncadella | (Italy) Prema Powerteam |
| 7 | R1 | (United Kingdom) Silverstone Circuit | 10 September | (Spain) Roberto Merhi | (Spain) Roberto Merhi | (Spain) Roberto Merhi | (Italy) Prema Powerteam |
| 7 | R2 | (United Kingdom) Silverstone Circuit | 10 September | | (Denmark) Marco Sørensen | (Denmark) Marco Sørensen | (Germany) Mücke Motorsport |
| 7 | R3 | (United Kingdom) Silverstone Circuit | 11 September | (Spain) Roberto Merhi | (Spain) Roberto Merhi | (Germany) Marco Wittmann | (France) Signature |
| 8 | R1 | (Spain) Circuit Ricardo Tormo, Valencia | 1 October | (Netherlands) Nigel Melker | (Netherlands) Nigel Melker | (Netherlands) Nigel Melker | (Germany) Mücke Motorsport |
| 8 | R2 | (Spain) Circuit Ricardo Tormo, Valencia | 1 October | | (Germany) Marco Wittmann | (Germany) Marco Wittmann | (France) Signature |
| 8 | R3 | (Spain) Circuit Ricardo Tormo, Valencia | 2 October | (Spain) Roberto Merhi | (Spain) Roberto Merhi | (Spain) Roberto Merhi | (Italy) Prema Powerteam |
| 9 | R1 | (Germany) Hockenheimring | 22 October | (Spain) Roberto Merhi | (Sweden) Felix Rosenqvist | (Spain) Roberto Merhi | (Italy) Prema Powerteam |
| 9 | R2 | (Germany) Hockenheimring | 22 October | | (Sweden) Felix Rosenqvist | (Sweden) Felix Rosenqvist | (Germany) Mücke Motorsport |
| 9 | R3 | (Germany) Hockenheimring | 23 October | (Spain) Roberto Merhi | (Sweden) Felix Rosenqvist | (Spain) Roberto Merhi | (Italy) Prema Powerteam |

== Standings ==
- Points are awarded as follows:

| | 1 | 2 | 3 | 4 | 5 | 6 | 7 | 8 | 9 | 10 |
|---|---|---|---|---|---|---|---|---|---|---|
| Race 1 & 3 | 25 | 18 | 15 | 12 | 10 | 8 | 6 | 4 | 2 | 1 |
| Race 2 | 10 | 8 | 6 | 5 | 4 | 3 | 2 | 1 | 0 | |

=== Drivers' Championship ===
| Pos | Driver | LEC (France) | | | HOC (Germany) | | | ZAN (Netherlands) | | | RBR (Austria) | | | NOR (Germany) | | | NÜR (Germany) | | | SIL (United Kingdom) | | | VAL (Spain) | | | HOC (Germany) | | | Pts |
|---|---|---|---|---|---|---|---|---|---|---|---|---|---|---|---|---|---|---|---|---|---|---|---|---|---|---|---|---|---|
| 1 | (Spain) Roberto Merhi | **4** | 1 | **2** | **1** | 4 | 1 | 3 | 4 | 4 | 1 | 1 | Ret | 4 | 2 | 2 | 1 | 1 | 2 | **1** | 3 | **2** | 3 | 5 | **1** | **1** | 2 | **1** | 406 |
| 2 | (Germany) Marco Wittmann | 5 | 2 | 3 | 2 | 3 | **2** | 10 | 6 | **1** | 3 | 11 | Ret | **3** | 1 | **1** | 6 | 11 | 6 | 2 | 10 | 1 | 6 | 1 | 5 | 4 | 4 | 4 | 285 |
| 3 | (Spain) Daniel Juncadella | 3 | 3 | 1 | 6 | 1 | 4 | 5 | 7 | 12† | **2** | 6 | **1** | Ret | 3 | 11 | **2** | 4 | **1** | 3 | 2 | 8 | 4 | 3 | 2 | 7 | 6 | 3 | 280 |
| 4 | (Netherlands) Nigel Melker | 1 | 12 | 4 | 7 | 11 | 5 | **1** | 11 | 3 | 5 | Ret | 2 | 1 | 11 | 10 | 4 | 6 | 3 | | | | **1** | 8 | 3 | 6 | 5 | 2 | 251 |
| 5 | (Sweden) Felix Rosenqvist | 2 | 4 | Ret | 5 | 5 | 3 | 2 | 3 | 2 | Ret | 10 | Ret | DSQ | 5 | 5 | 3 | 2 | 4 | 4 | 7 | Ret | 2 | 6 | 4 | 2 | 1 | Ret | 219 |
| 6 | (Belgium) Laurens Vanthoor | 8 | 7 | 5 | 3 | 6 | 15 | 4 | 5 | 6 | 7 | 2 | 7 | 2 | 8 | 4 | 5 | 3 | 5 | 6 | 6 | 4 | 11 | 11† | 6 | 3 | 9 | 12 | 189 |
| 7 | (Germany) Daniel Abt | Ret | 11 | 9 | 4 | 7 | 6 | Ret | 8 | 5 | 6 | 3 | 4 | 10† | 10 | 3 | 12 | 7 | 7 | 5 | 5 | 5 | 10 | 10 | 7 | 5 | 3 | 6 | 150 |
| 8 | (Colombia) Carlos Muñoz | 6 | 5 | 7 | 8 | 2 | 9 | 6 | 12 | 8 | 10 | 9 | 5 | 9 | Ret | 13 | 9 | 8 | 8 | 10 | 11 | 3 | 5 | 7 | 10 | 8 | 14† | Ret | 105 |
| 9 | (Sweden) Jimmy Eriksson | 10 | 9 | 6 | 9 | 8 | 7 | 9 | 9 | 7 | 9 | 5 | 6 | 5 | 4 | 7 | 10 | Ret | 10 | 9 | 9 | 6 | 9 | 9 | 11 | 9 | 8 | 7 | 93 |
| 10 | (Japan) Kimiya Sato | Ret | 6 | 8 | Ret | 12 | 10 | 7 | 1 | 10 | 11 | 4 | 10 | 6 | Ret | 8 | 8 | 5 | 12 | 8 | 4 | DSQ | 8 | 2 | 9 | Ret | 7 | 9 | 86 |
| 11 | (Canada) Gianmarco Raimondo | 9 | 10 | 10 | Ret | 13 | 14 | 8 | 2 | 11 | 8 | 7 | 8 | Ret | 6 | Ret | 7 | 9 | 9 | 12† | 8 | Ret | 7 | 4 | 8 | 13† | 13 | 8 | 66 |
| 12 | (Poland) Kuba Giermaziak | 7 | 8 | Ret | 14 | 14 | Ret | Ret | 10 | 9 | 12 | 8 | 9 | 7 | Ret | 6 | 11 | 10 | 11 | | | | | | | | | | 29 |
Guest drivers ineligible for points
| | (Denmark) Marco Sørensen | | | | | | | | | | | | | | | | | | | 7 | 1 | Ret | | | | | | | 0 |
| | (France) Tom Dillmann | | | | 12 | 10 | 8 | | | | 4 | 12† | 3 | | | | | | | | | | | | | | | | 0 |
| | (Spain) Carlos Sainz Jr. | | | | | | | | | | | | | | | | | | | | | | | | | Ret | Ret | 5 | 0 |
| | (Israel) Alon Day | | | | | | | | | | | | | 8 | 7 | 12 | | | | 11 | Ret | 7 | | | | | | | 0 |
| | (Switzerland) Sandro Zeller | | | | 13 | 15 | 13 | | | | | | | Ret | 9 | 9 | | | | | | | | | | 11 | 12 | 10 | 0 |
| | (Malaysia) Jazeman Jaafar | | | | 10 | 9 | 11 | | | | | | | | | | | | | | | | | | | | | | 0 |
| | (Argentina) Facu Regalia | | | | | | | | | | | | | | | | | | | | | | | | | 10 | 10 | Ret | 0 |
| | (Russia) Artem Markelov | | | | | | | | | | | | | | | | | | | | | | | | | 12 | 11 | 11 | 0 |
| | (Colombia) Carlos Huertas | | | | 11 | Ret | 12 | | | | | | | | | | | | | | | | | | | | | | 0 |
| Pos | Driver | LEC (France) | | | HOC (Germany) | | | ZAN (Netherlands) | | | RBR (Austria) | | | NOR (Germany) | | | NÜR (Germany) | | | SIL (United Kingdom) | | | VAL (Spain) | | | HOC (Germany) | | | Pts |

| Colour | Result |
|---|---|
| Gold | Winner |
| Silver | Second place |
| Bronze | Third place |
| Green | Points classification |
| Blue | Non-points classification |
| Blue | Non-classified finish (NC) |
| Purple | Retired, not classified (Ret) |
| Red | Did not qualify (DNQ) |
| Red | Did not pre-qualify (DNPQ) |
| Black | Disqualified (DSQ) |
| White | Did not start (DNS) |
| White | Withdrew (WD) |
| White | Race cancelled (C) |
| Blank | Did not practice (DNP) |
| Blank | Did not arrive (DNA) |
| Blank | Excluded (EX) |

**Bold** – Pole
Italics – Fastest Lap

† — Drivers did not finish the race, but were classified as they completed over 90% of the race distance.

=== Teams' Championship ===
| Pos | Team | LEC (France) | | | HOC (Germany) | | | ZAN (Netherlands) | | | RBR (Austria) | | | NOR (Germany) | | | NÜR (Germany) | | | SIL (United Kingdom) | | | VAL (Spain) | | | HOC (Germany) | | | Pts |
|---|---|---|---|---|---|---|---|---|---|---|---|---|---|---|---|---|---|---|---|---|---|---|---|---|---|---|---|---|---|
| 1 | (Italy) Prema Powerteam | 3 | 1 | 1 | 1 | 1 | 1 | 3 | 4 | 4 | 1 | 1 | 1 | 4 | 2 | 2 | 1 | 1 | 1 | 1 | 2 | 2 | 3 | 3 | 1 | 1 | 2 | 1 | 693 |
| 1 | (Italy) Prema Powerteam | 4 | 3 | 2 | 6 | 4 | 4 | 5 | 7 | 12 | 2 | 6 | 8 | Ret | 3 | 11 | 2 | 4 | 2 | 3 | 3 | 8 | 4 | 4 | 2 | 7 | 6 | 3 | 693 |
| 2 | (France) Signature | 5 | 2 | 3 | 2 | 2 | 2 | 4 | 5 | 1 | 3 | 2 | 4 | 2 | 1 | 1 | 5 | 3 | 5 | 2 | 5 | 1 | 5 | 1 | 5 | 3 | 3 | 4 | 570 |
| 2 | (France) Signature | 6 | 5 | 5 | 3 | 3 | 6 | 6 | 6 | 5 | 6 | 3 | 5 | 3 | 8 | 3 | 6 | 7 | 6 | 6 | 6 | 3 | 6 | 7 | 6 | 4 | 4 | 6 | 570 |
| 3 | (Germany) Mücke Motorsport | 1 | 4 | 4 | 5 | 5 | 3 | 1 | 3 | 2 | 5 | 10 | 2 | 1 | 5 | 5 | 3 | 2 | 3 | 4 | 1 | Ret | 1 | 6 | 3 | 2 | 1 | 2 | 470 |
| 3 | (Germany) Mücke Motorsport | 2 | 12 | Ret | 7 | 11 | 5 | 2 | 11 | 3 | Ret | Ret | Ret | DSQ | 11 | 10 | 4 | 6 | 4 | 7 | 7 | Ret | 2 | 8 | 4 | 6 | 5 | Ret | 470 |
| 4 | (Germany) Motopark (Germany) STAR Racing Team | 7 | 6 | 6 | 9 | 8 | 7 | 7 | 1 | 7 | 9 | 4 | 6 | 5 | 4 | 6 | 8 | 5 | 10 | 8 | 4 | 6 | 8 | 2 | 9 | 9 | 7 | 7 | 205 |
| 4 | (Germany) Motopark (Germany) STAR Racing Team | 9 | 8 | 8 | 14 | 12 | 10 | 8 | 2 | 9 | 11 | 5 | 9 | 6 | Ret | 7 | 10 | 10 | 11 | 9 | 9 | DSQ | 9 | 9 | 11 | Ret | 8 | 9 | 205 |
Guest teams ineligible for points
| | (Austria) HS Engineering | | | | | | | | | | | | | 8 | 7 | 12 | | | | 11 | Ret | 7 | | | | | | | 0 |
| | (United Kingdom) Carlin | | | | 10 | 9 | 8 | | | | | | | | | | | | | | | | | | | | | | 0 |
| | (United Kingdom) Carlin | | | | 11 | 10 | 11 | | | | | | | | | | | | | | | | | | | | | | 0 |
| | (Switzerland) Jo Zeller Racing | | | | 13 | 15 | 13 | | | | | | | Ret | 9 | 9 | | | | | | | | | | 11 | 12 | 10 | 0 |
| Pos | Team | LEC (France) | | | HOC (Germany) | | | ZAN (Netherlands) | | | RBR (Austria) | | | NOR (Germany) | | | NÜR (Germany) | | | SIL (United Kingdom) | | | VAL (Spain) | | | HOC (Germany) | | | Pts |

=== Nations Cup ===
| Pos | Nation | LEC (France) | | | HOC (Germany) | | | ZAN (Netherlands) | | | RBR (Austria) | | | NOR (Germany) | | | NÜR (Germany) | | | SIL (United Kingdom) | | | VAL (Spain) | | | HOC (Germany) | | | Pts |
|---|---|---|---|---|---|---|---|---|---|---|---|---|---|---|---|---|---|---|---|---|---|---|---|---|---|---|---|---|---|
| 1 | Spain | 3 | 1 | 1 | 1 | 1 | 1 | 3 | 4 | 4 | 1 | 1 | 1 | 4 | 2 | 2 | 1 | 1 | 1 | 1 | 2 | 2 | 3 | 3 | 1 | 1 | 2 | 1 | 686 |
| 1 | Spain | 4 | 3 | 2 | 6 | 4 | 4 | 5 | 7 | 12 | 2 | 6 | Ret | Ret | 3 | 11 | 2 | 4 | 2 | 3 | 3 | 8 | 4 | 5 | 2 | 7 | 6 | 3 | 686 |
| 2 | Germany | 5 | 2 | 3 | 2 | 3 | 2 | 10 | 6 | 1 | 3 | 3 | 4 | 3 | 1 | 1 | 6 | 7 | 6 | 2 | 5 | 1 | 6 | 1 | 5 | 4 | 3 | 4 | 435 |
| 2 | Germany | Ret | 11 | 9 | 4 | 7 | 6 | Ret | 8 | 5 | 6 | 11 | Ret | 10 | 10 | 3 | 12 | 11 | 7 | 5 | 10 | 5 | 10 | 10 | 7 | 5 | 4 | 6 | 435 |
| 3 | Sweden | 2 | 4 | 6 | 5 | 5 | 3 | 2 | 3 | 2 | 9 | 5 | 6 | 5 | 4 | 5 | 3 | 2 | 4 | 4 | 7 | 6 | 2 | 6 | 4 | 2 | 1 | 7 | 312 |
| 3 | Sweden | 10 | 9 | Ret | 9 | 5 | 7 | 9 | 9 | 7 | Ret | 10 | Ret | DSQ | 5 | 7 | 10 | Ret | 10 | 9 | 9 | Ret | 9 | 9 | 11 | 9 | 8 | Ret | 312 |
| 4 | Netherlands | 1 | 12 | 4 | 7 | 11 | 5 | 1 | 11 | 3 | 5 | Ret | 2 | 1 | 11 | 10 | 4 | 6 | 3 | | | | 1 | 8 | 3 | 6 | 5 | 2 | 251 |
| 5 | Belgium | 8 | 7 | 5 | 3 | 6 | 15 | 4 | 5 | 6 | 7 | 2 | 7 | 2 | 8 | 4 | 5 | 3 | 5 | 6 | 6 | 4 | 11 | 11 | 6 | 3 | 9 | 12 | 189 |
| 6 | Colombia | 6 | 5 | 7 | 8 | 2 | 9 | 6 | 12 | 8 | 10 | 9 | 5 | 9 | Ret | 13 | 9 | 8 | 8 | 10 | 11 | 3 | 5 | 7 | 10 | 8 | 14 | Ret | 105 |
| 6 | Colombia | | | | 11 | Ret | 12 | | | | | | | | | | | | | | | | | | | | | | 105 |
| 7 | Japan | Ret | 6 | 8 | Ret | 12 | 10 | 7 | 1 | 10 | 11 | 4 | 10 | 6 | Ret | 8 | 8 | 5 | 12 | 8 | 4 | DSQ | 8 | 2 | 9 | Ret | 7 | 9 | 86 |
| 8 | Canada | 9 | 10 | 10 | Ret | 13 | 14 | 8 | 2 | 11 | 8 | 7 | 8 | Ret | 6 | Ret | 7 | 9 | 9 | 12 | 8 | Ret | 7 | 4 | 8 | 13 | 13 | 8 | 66 |
| 9 | Poland | 7 | 8 | Ret | 14 | 14 | Ret | Ret | 10 | 9 | 12 | 8 | 9 | 7 | Ret | 6 | 11 | 10 | 11 | | | | | | | | | | 29 |
Guest nations ineligible for points
| | Denmark | | | | | | | | | | | | | | | | | | | 7 | 1 | Ret | | | | | | | 0 |
| | France | | | | 12 | 10 | 8 | | | | 4 | 12 | 3 | | | | | | | | | | | | | | | | 0 |
| | Israel | | | | | | | | | | | | | 8 | 7 | 12 | | | | 11 | Ret | 7 | | | | | | | 0 |
| | Switzerland | | | | 13 | 15 | 13 | | | | | | | Ret | 9 | 9 | | | | | | | | | | 11 | 12 | 10 | 0 |
| | Malaysia | | | | 10 | 9 | 11 | | | | | | | | | | | | | | | | | | | | | | 0 |
| | Argentina | | | | | | | | | | | | | | | | | | | | | | | | | 10 | 10 | Ret | 0 |
| | Russia | | | | | | | | | | | | | | | | | | | | | | | | | 12 | 11 | 11 | 0 |
| Pos | Nation | LEC (France) | | | HOC (Germany) | | | ZAN (Netherlands) | | | RBR (Austria) | | | NOR (Germany) | | | NÜR (Germany) | | | SIL (United Kingdom) | | | VAL (Spain) | | | HOC (Germany) | | | Pts |
