= Marco Wittmann =

German racing driver

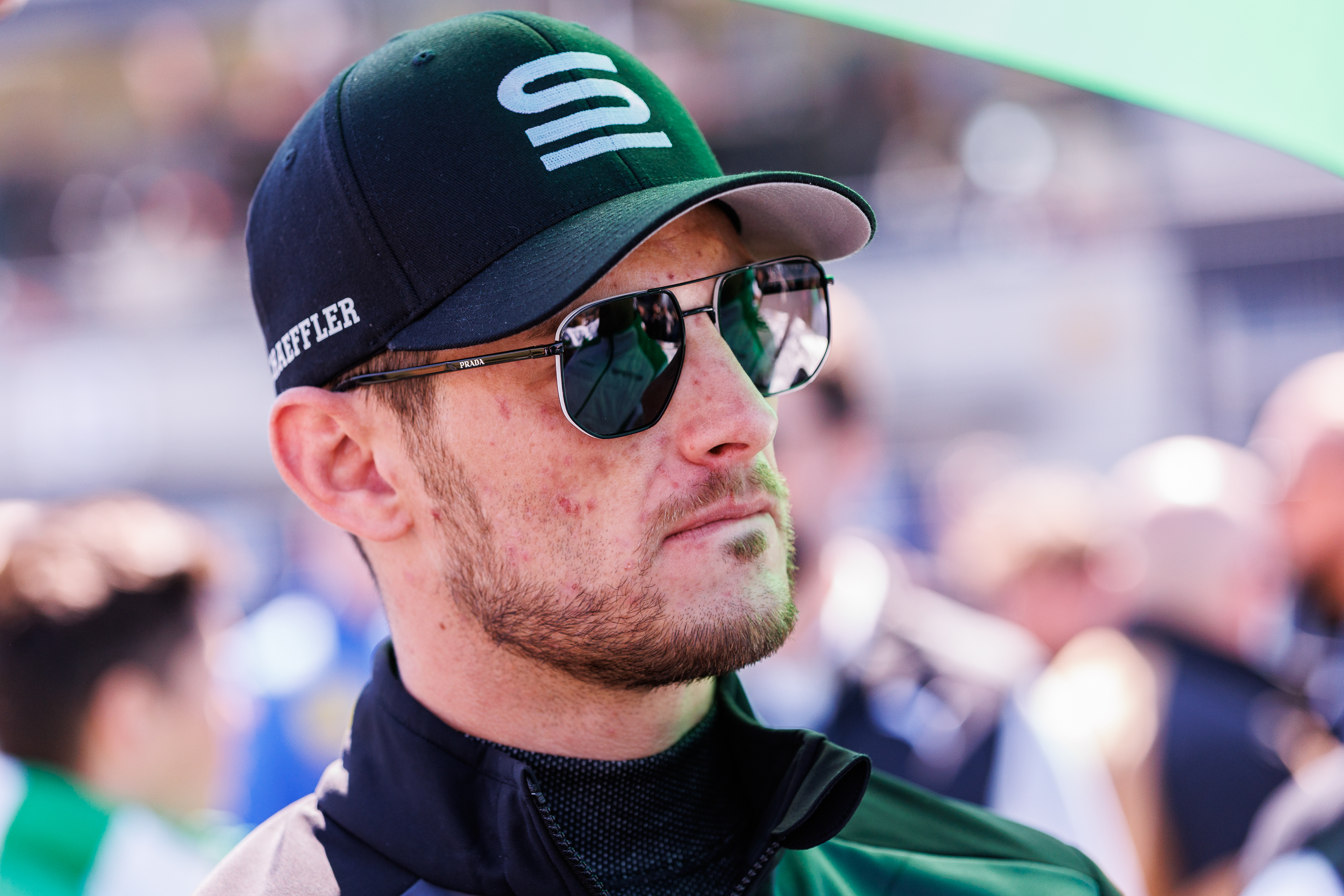
- Wittmann in 2025
- Nationality: (Germany) German
- Born: 24 November 1989 (age 36) Fürth, West Germany

DTM career
- Debut season: 2013
- Current team: Schubert Motorsport
- Categorisation: FIA Platinum
- Car number: 11
- Former teams: BMW Team MTEK, BMW Team RMG, Walkenhorst Motorsport, Project 1
- Starts: 228
- Championships: 2 (2014, 2016)
- Wins: 21
- Podiums: 57
- Poles: 18
- Fastest laps: 11

Previous series
- 2009-2011 2008 2007: Formula 3 Euro Series; Formula BMW Europe; Formula BMW ADAC

Championship titles
- 2014, 2016: DTM

Marco Wittmann (born 24 November 1989) is a German professional racing driver and BMW Motorsport works driver.

Managed by Gravity throughout his junior career, Wittmann was Formula 3 Euro Series runner-up for Signature in 2010 and 2011. After a season as test driver, Wittmann graduated to the Deutsche Tourenwagen Masters with BMW. He was crowned DTM champion in 2014 and 2016, tested for Toro Rosso in Formula One in 2015, and won the 24 Hours of Spa in 2023. Wittmann is also a factory driver for BMW's LMDh effort in WEC and IMSA since 2023.

As of November 2026, Wittmann has scored 21 race victories in the DTM.

== Early career ==
Having competed in karting since the age of six, notably claiming the 2004 German Junior Karting Championship, Wittmann made his first outing in car racing in 2007, driving for Josef Kaufmann Racing in the Formula BMW ADAC series, under the guidance of Gérard López and Eric Lux's Gravity Sport Management. In a strong debut season, he won two races and finished fifth in the standings. He remained with the team for the 2008 season in the newly-formed Formula BMW Europe, where he scored 11 podiums including one victory, but was beaten to the title by teammate Esteban Gutiérrez. Going into 2009, Wittmann progressed into Formula 3, joining Mücke Motorsport in the Formula 3 Euro Series. After a year of struggle, his lone points finishes would come at the final round in Hockenheim, which helped him to finish 16th in the standings.

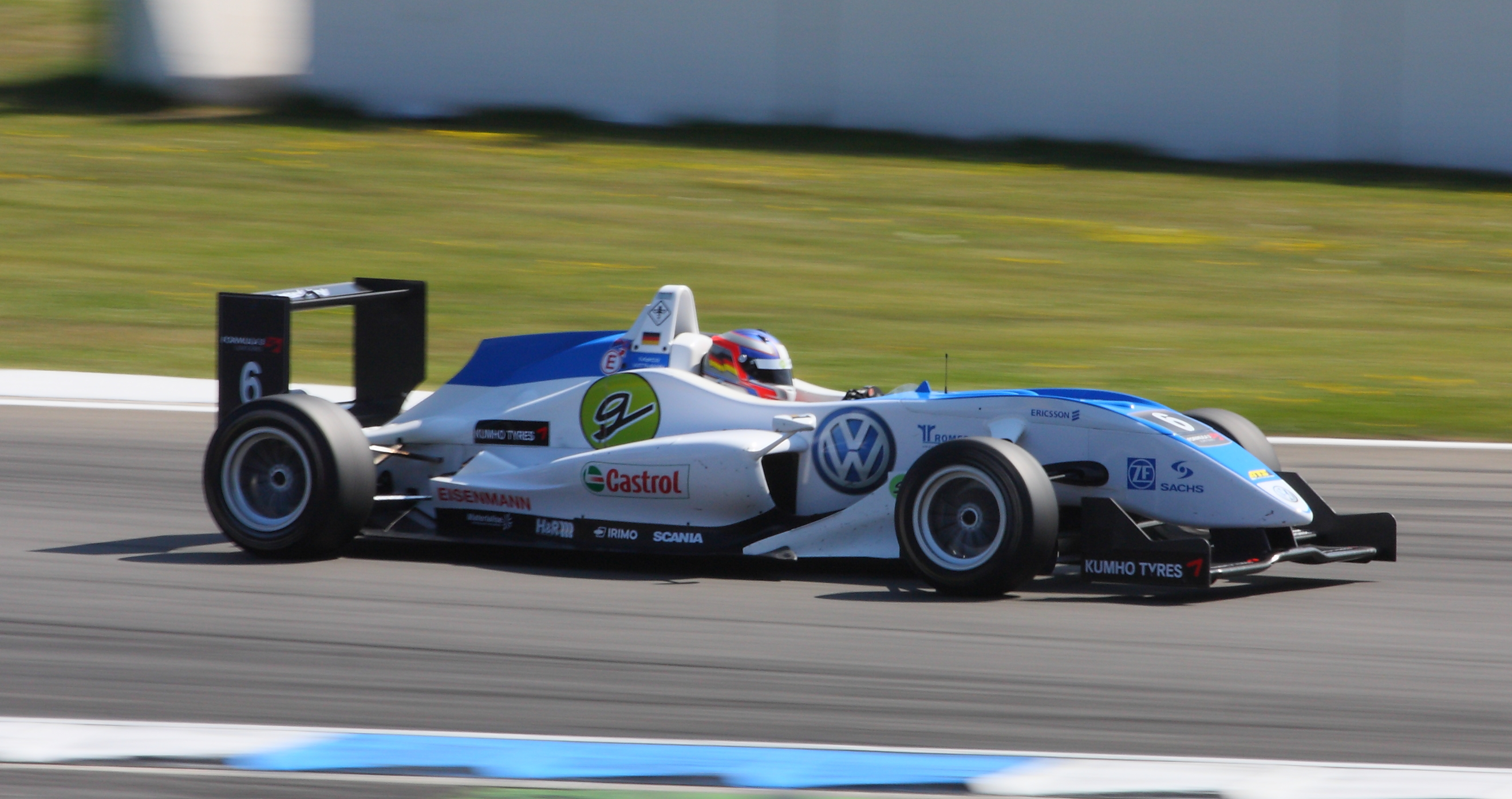
Wittmann competing at the second round of the 2010 Formula 3 Euro Series at Hockenheim.

Wittmann switched to Signature in 2010, remaining in the Euro Series. Following a double podium at the opening round, Wittmann won the first race at Hockenheim and put himself into the title hunt. Though this ended up being his only win of the year, he finished the campaign second overall with a total of ten podiums across 18 races. He also finished third in the Masters of Formula 3 event and took home fourth on his Macau Grand Prix debut. In 2013, Wittmann embarked on his third year in the Euro Series, remaining with Signature. Podiums came often that year, as Wittmann scored 13 in 27 races and took five wins, including victories at the Pau Grand Prix and two triumphs at the Norisring. Despite his successes, Wittmann was beaten by the dominant combination of Roberto Merhi and the Prema Powerteam, once again finishing second overall. During the same year he also finished second at the Masters of F3 and scored the pole position for the Macau Grand Prix, though he would only manage to finish third after falling down to fifth due to the slipstream his rivals received following a safety car restart.

== DTM career (2012–present) ==
Wittmann conducted multiple DTM tests for BMW at the end of 2011, after which he was signed to be the marque's official test driver for the 2012 season. In addition, he would compete in a number of endurance events in GT3 machinery, most notably at the 24 Hours of Nürburgring where he finished ninth. 2013 would become Wittmann's maiden year in the DTM, as he would be piloting a BMW M3 DTM for Team MTEK. He made a strong impression initially, getting points in his first two starts before finishing second at the Red Bull Ring. He later scored a pole at Zandvoort and finished the season eighth in points, highest of all rookies.

Entering the 2014 season with Team RMG, Wittmann would start out strongly with a win at Hockenheim. An off in the rain at Oschersleben was followed by a dominant victory at the Hungaroring which put him back into the championship lead. After two further points finishes, Wittmann would take control of the title hunt by winning the races in Spielberg and the Nürburgring, before taking the title at the third-to-last event with a sixth place. He capped off the year with a podium at Zandvoort and fifth place in Hockenheim, finishing 50 points ahead of runner-up Mattias Ekström.

Wittmann returned to Team RMG in 2015, once again partnering Maxime Martin. The season, now containing two-race weekends, did not start well, as Wittmann only scored three points finishes in the first six races. He would return to the top step at Zandvoort, defending well against fellow BMW driver António Félix da Costa, but was only able to follow this up with a podium in Moscow and one at Oschersleben, eventually ending up sixth in the standings. During the summer of 2015 meanwhile, Wittmann was able to test the Toro Rosso STR10 Formula One car at the Red Bull Ring, garnering praise from race engineer Phil Charles for his technical feedback, cleanness, and long-run rhythm.

After a mixed first round of 2016, the RMG driver managed to win from pole in Spielberg, before going on a points-scoring streak that lasted for nine races. Wittmann took two huge steps towards a second DTM title by winning race two in Moscow and race one at the Nürburgring, taking both wins in a controlling manner. The title fight would become tighter following a disqualification for a technical infringement in Hungary however, whereafter Wittmann led the standings by just 14 points to Edoardo Mortara. On Saturday in Hockenheim, Wittmann was able to extend the gap by finishing second to Mortara's third, and despite the Italian's victory on Sunday the BMW driver reclaimed the title by finishing fourth.

Wittmann began his 2017 season with a luckless start, exemplified by a car-related retirement at the Hungaroring with two laps remaining. He would return towards stronger results in the latter half of the campaign, scoring four podiums in the final five events, though he also garnered attention for his repeated critique of Audi's drivers and their driving etiquette over the team radio. Wittmann ended the year by winning at the season finale, which put him fifth in the championship. In 2018, Wittmann was comprehensively beaten in the standings by Gary Paffett, René Rast, and Paul di Resta, coming home fourth overall after winning in Hungary and defending well against Mortara to take the spoils at the Norisring.

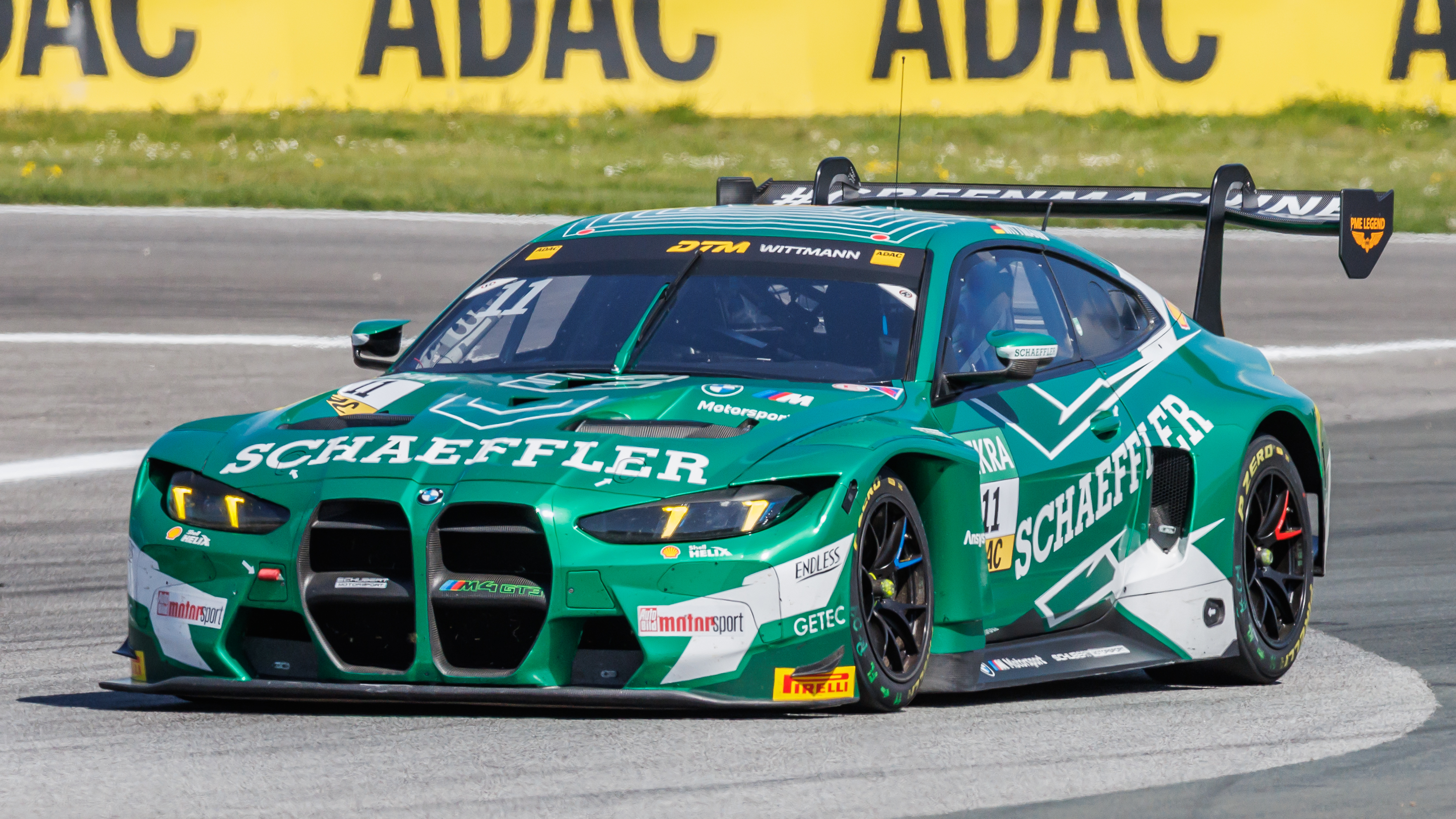
Wittmann at Motorsport Arena Oschersleben in 2025

Having taken part in the Formula E test after the Marrakesh ePrix with BMW i Andretti Autosport at the start of 2019, Wittmann returned to contest a sixth DTM season as part of Team RMG. It started off positively, as Wittmann triumphed from pole at the Hockenheim season opener and qualified first again at Zolder. He then won again at Misano before going on a small streak during the middle of the year, winning race one at Assen, finishing second in race two despite starting from the back of the grid before winning at Brands Hatch, briefly putting himself into the title fight with René Rast and Nico Müller. Unfortunately for the German, he was only able to score two podiums in the remaining three events while Rast and Müller pulled away with multiple victories; thus, Wittmann ended the season third in points. In 2020, the final season of the DTM "Class 1" era, Wittmann experienced his worst year of his DTM tenure so far, only finishing on the rostrum three times and placing ninth in the standings. In the face of a dominant Audi team, Wittmann stated that he was happy to begin new projects following the 2020 season.

== GT career (2021–present) ==
When the DTM moved to adopt the GT3 ruleset ahead of the 2021 campaign, Wittmann went on the move as well, leaving RMG to join Walkenhorst Motorsport. Despite being the team's only driver, Wittmann found himself fourth in the standings after the first half of the season, finishing every race inside the top eight and winning at Zolder. He then started from pole at the Red Bull Ring but narrowly lost victory to Liam Lawson, though he bounced back by taking a victory at Assen and inheriting third place on Sunday after a technical issue for Daniel Juncadella. However, two non-scores at Hockenheim virtually eliminated the German from the title fight and he ended the year fourth overall. Meanwhile, Wittmann would also score his maiden podium at the 24 Hours of Nürburgring, finishing second for Rowe Racing alongside Martin Tomczyk, Sheldon van der Linde, and Connor De Phillippi.

Once again driving for Walkenhorst, Wittmann suffered a less fruitful 2022 season. A number of retirements in the first half of the year set him back, and he had only scored one podium going into the final round at Hockenheim. There, Wittmann finished third on Saturday before battling past René Rast on Sunday, eventually taking a dominating win to take himself up to eighth place in the standings.

2023 saw Wittmann's most diverse schedule yet. Not only would he be racing in the DTM at Project 1, but he would partner Nick Yelloly and Philipp Eng at ROWE Racing in the GT World Challenge Europe Endurance Cup. In addition, he became BMW's third driver for the three endurance events of the IMSA SportsCar Championship, driving the BMW M Hybrid V8 in the new GTP class alongside Eng and Augusto Farfus. The year bore little fruit in the DTM, as Wittmann and the soon-to-be-bankrupt team failed to score a podium and finished 13th in the drivers' championship. In the GTWC Endurance Cup meanwhile, the ROWE trio won the season opener at Monza and came out on top at the prestigious 24 Hours of Spa. They fell behind the AKKodis ASP Team following a weak end to the campaign, taking home the runner-up spot overall. Finally, the three IMSA endurance events did not yield much success, as the No. 24 BMW scored a best result of sixth at Daytona.

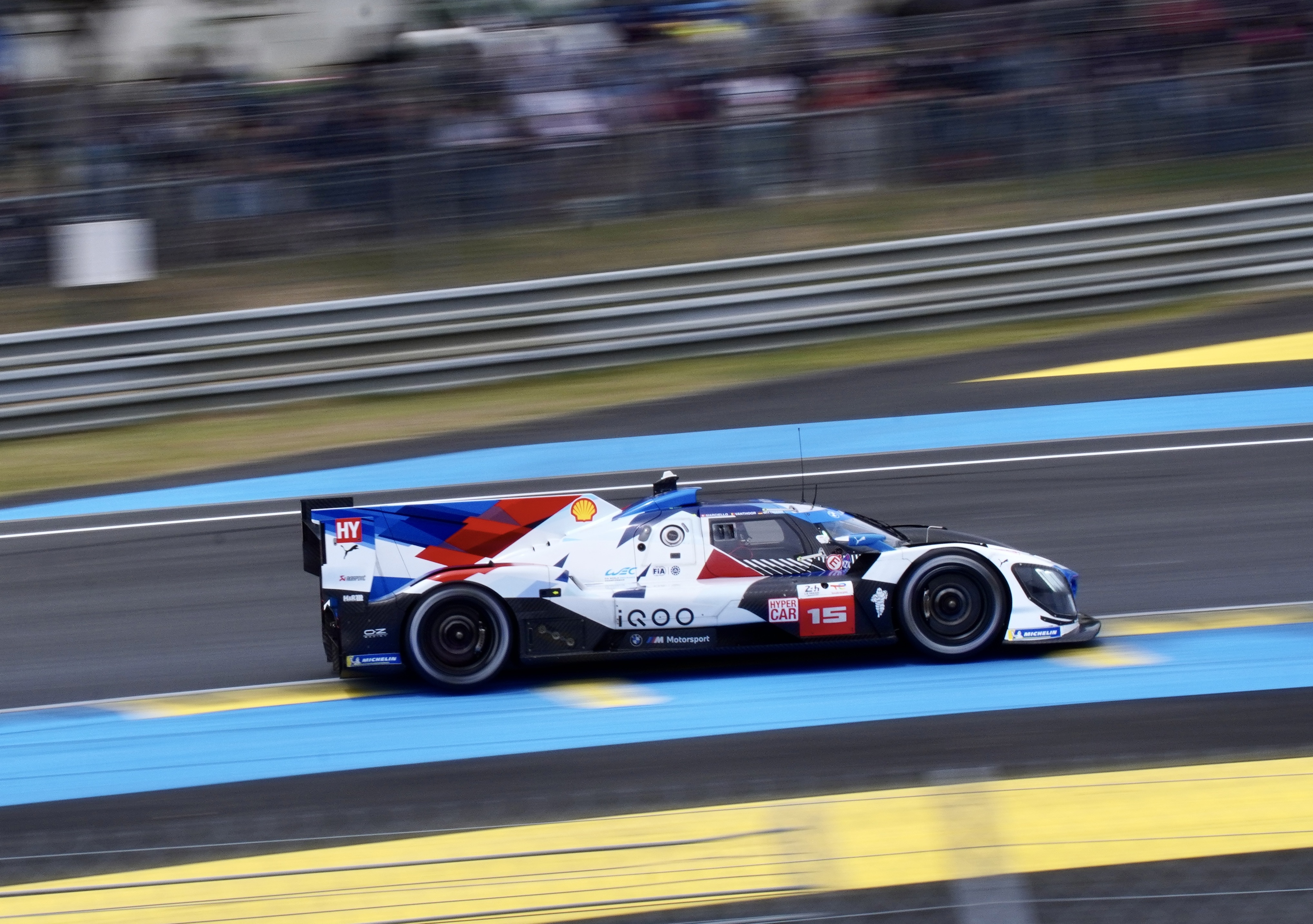
The #15 BMW M Hybrid V8 driven by Marco Wittmann, Raffaele Marciello and Dries Vanthoor at the 2024 24 Hours of Le Mans

Wittmann would be racing on two fronts in 2024, as he became part of Schubert Motorsport in the DTM alongside fellow champions René Rast and Sheldon van der Linde, and was named as one of BMW M Team WRT's six drivers in the Hypercar category of the FIA World Endurance Championship, partnering Raffaele Marciello and Dries Vanthoor in the No. 15.

== Personal life ==
Wittmann was a Red Bull athlete between 2016 and 2017, and has served as a Schaeffler brand ambassador since 2019. Wittmann is also the co-founder and CEO of management agency 3Eleven Performance, which supports the careers of racing drivers and cyclists.

== Racing record ==
=== Career summary ===
| Season | Series | Team | Races | Wins | Poles | F/Laps | Podiums | Points | Position |
|---|---|---|---|---|---|---|---|---|---|
| 2007 | Formula BMW ADAC | Josef Kaufmann Racing | 18 | 2 | 4 | 2 | 7 | 570 | 5th |
| 2008 | Formula BMW Europe | Josef Kaufmann Racing | 16 | 1 | 1 | 1 | 11 | 327 | **2nd** |
| 2009 | Formula 3 Euro Series | Mücke Motorsport | 20 | 0 | 0 | 0 | 0 | 6 | 16th |
| 2009 | Masters of Formula 3 | Mücke Motorsport | 1 | 0 | 0 | 0 | 0 | N/A | 26th |
| 2010 | Formula 3 Euro Series | Signature | 18 | 1 | 1 | 2 | 10 | 76 | **2nd** |
| 2010 | Macau Grand Prix | Signature | 1 | 0 | 0 | 0 | 0 | N/A | 4th |
| 2010 | Masters of Formula 3 | Signature | 1 | 0 | 0 | 0 | 1 | N/A | **3rd** |
| 2011 | Formula 3 Euro Series | Signature | 27 | 5 | 4 | 5 | 13 | 285 | **2nd** |
| 2011 | Macau Grand Prix | Signature | 1 | 0 | 1 | 1 | 1 | N/A | **3rd** |
| 2011 | Masters of Formula 3 | Signature | 1 | 0 | 0 | 0 | 1 | N/A | **2nd** |
| 2012 | 24 Hours of Nürburgring - SP9 | BMW Team Vita4one | 1 | 0 | 0 | 0 | 0 | N/A | 9th |
| 2012 | Deutsche Tourenwagen Masters | BMW Motorsport | Test driver | | | | | | |
| 2013 | Deutsche Tourenwagen Masters | BMW Team MTEK | 10 | 0 | 1 | 2 | 1 | 49 | 8th |
| 2014 | Deutsche Tourenwagen Masters | BMW Team RMG | 10 | 4 | 3 | 3 | 5 | 156 | **1st** |
| 2014 | 24 Hours of Nürburgring - SP9 | BMW Sports Trophy Team Marc VDS | 1 | 0 | 0 | 0 | 0 | N/A | DNF |
| 2015 | Deutsche Tourenwagen Masters | BMW Team RMG | 18 | 1 | 1 | 0 | 3 | 112 | 6th |
| 2015 | 24 Hours of Nürburgring - SP9 | BMW Sports Trophy Team Schubert | 1 | 0 | 0 | 0 | 0 | N/A | DNF |
| 2015 | Formula One | Scuderia Toro Rosso | Test driver | | | | | | |
| 2016 | Deutsche Tourenwagen Masters | BMW Team RMG | 18 | 3 | 3 | 0 | 6 | 206 | **1st** |
| 2016 | IMSA SportsCar Championship | Turner Motorsport | 1 | 0 | 0 | 0 | 0 | 0 | NC |
| 2016 | 24 Hours of Nürburgring - SP9 | Schubert Motorsport | 1 | 0 | 0 | 0 | 0 | N/A | NC |
| 2017 | Intercontinental GT Challenge | BMW Team SRM | 1 | 0 | 0 | 0 | 0 | 0 | NC |
| 2017 | Deutsche Tourenwagen Masters | BMW Team RMG | 18 | 1 | 1 | 0 | 5 | 160 | 5th |
| 2017 | FIA GT World Cup | FIST Team AAI | 2 | 0 | 0 | 0 | 0 | N/A | 6th |
| 2017 | 24 Hours of Nürburgring - SP9 | BMW Team Schnitzer | 1 | 0 | 0 | 0 | 0 | N/A | 4th |
| 2018 | Deutsche Tourenwagen Masters | BMW Team RMG | 20 | 2 | 1 | 2 | 6 | 164 | 4th |
| 2018 | Blancpain GT Series Endurance Cup | Rowe Racing | 2 | 0 | 0 | 0 | 0 | 0 | NC |
| 2019 | Deutsche Tourenwagen Masters | BMW Team RMG | 18 | 4 | 4 | 0 | 7 | 202 | **3rd** |
| 2019 | 24 Hours of Nürburgring - SP9 | Rowe Racing | 1 | 0 | 0 | 0 | 0 | N/A | DNF |
| 2020 | Deutsche Tourenwagen Masters | BMW Team RMG | 18 | 0 | 0 | 1 | 3 | 95 | 9th |
| 2020 | 24 Hours of Nürburgring - SP9 | Rowe Racing | 1 | 0 | 0 | 0 | 0 | N/A | 4th |
| 2021 | Deutsche Tourenwagen Masters | Walkenhorst Motorsport | 16 | 2 | 2 | 1 | 5 | 171 | 4th |
| 2021 | GT World Challenge Europe Endurance Cup | Walkenhorst Motorsport | 3 | 0 | 0 | 0 | 0 | 4 | 28th |
| 2021 | IMSA SportsCar Championship - GTLM | BMW Team RLL | 1 | 0 | 0 | 0 | 1 | 325 | 12th |
| 2021 | 24 Hours of Nürburgring - SP9 | Rowe Racing | 1 | 0 | 0 | 0 | 1 | N/A | **2nd** |
| 2022 | Deutsche Tourenwagen Masters | Walkenhorst Motorsport | 16 | 1 | 0 | 1 | 3 | 98 | 8th |
| 2022 | IMSA SportsCar Championship - GTD Pro | BMW M Team RLL | 2 | 0 | 0 | 0 | 0 | 542 | 20th |
| 2022 | 24 Hours of Nürburgring - SP9 | Rowe Racing | 1 | 0 | 0 | 0 | 0 | N/A | DNF |
| 2023 | Deutsche Tourenwagen Masters | Project 1 | 16 | 0 | 0 | 1 | 0 | 91 | 13th |
| 2023 | ADAC GT Masters | Project 1 | 2 | 0 | 0 | 1 | 1 | 33 | 19th |
| 2023 | GT World Challenge Europe Endurance Cup | Rowe Racing | 5 | 2 | 1 | 0 | 3 | 77 | **2nd** |
| 2023 | Intercontinental GT Challenge | Rowe Racing | 1 | 1 | 0 | 0 | 1 | 25 | 16th |
| 2023 | 24 Hours of Nürburgring - SP9 | Rowe Racing | 1 | 0 | 0 | 0 | 1 | N/A | **2nd** |
| 2023 | IMSA SportsCar Championship - GTP | BMW M Team RLL | 3 | 0 | 0 | 0 | 0 | 789 | 16th |
| 2024 | Deutsche Tourenwagen Masters | Schubert Motorsport | 16 | 1 | 0 | 0 | 2 | 110 | 12th |
| 2024 | FIA World Endurance Championship - Hypercar | BMW M Team WRT | 8 | 0 | 0 | 0 | 1 | 39 | 14th |
| 2024 | GT World Challenge Europe Endurance Cup | Rowe Racing | 3 | 0 | 0 | 0 | 0 | 10 | 22nd |
| 2024 | Nürburgring Langstrecken-Serie - SP9 | Rowe Racing | | | | | | | |
| 2024 | Intercontinental GT Challenge | Rowe Racing | | | | | | | |
| 2024 | 24 Hours of Nürburgring - SP9 | Rowe Racing | 1 | 0 | 0 | 0 | 0 | N/A | 7th |
| 2025 | Deutsche Tourenwagen Masters | Schubert Motorsport | 16 | 0 | 1 | 0 | 4 | 170 | 5th |
| 2025 | IMSA SportsCar Championship - GTP | BMW M Team RLL | 9 | 0 | 0 | 1 | 1 | 2469 | 8th |
| 2025 | GT World Challenge Europe Endurance Cup | Team WRT | 1 | 0 | 0 | 0 | 0 | 4 | 25th |
| 2025 | FIA World Endurance Championship - Hypercar | BMW M Team WRT | 1 | 0 | 0 | 0 | 0 | 10 | 24th |
| 2026 | IMSA SportsCar Championship - GTP | BMW M Team WRT | 9 | 0 | 0 | 0 | 2 | 2338 | 13th |
| 2026 | 24 Hours of Le Mans - Hypercar | BMW M Team WRT | Reserve driver | | | | | | |
| 2026 | Deutsche Tourenwagen Masters | Schubert Motorsport | 16 | 2 | 1 | 0 | 7 | 198 | **3rd** |
| 2026 | Nürburgring Langstrecken-Serie - SP9 | Schubert Motorsport | | | | | | | |
| 2026 | 24 Hours of Nürburgring - SP9 | Schubert Motorsport | 1 | 0 | 0 | 0 | 0 | N/A | 7th |
| 2026 | GT World Challenge Europe Endurance Cup | ROWE Racing | 1 | 0 | 0 | 0 | 0 | 0 | NC† |

^{*} Season still in progress.

=== Complete Formula BMW ADAC results ===
(key) (Races in bold indicate pole position; races in italics indicate fastest lap)

| Year | Entrant | 1 | 2 | 3 | 4 | 5 | 6 | 7 | 8 | 9 | 10 | 11 | 12 | 13 | 14 | 15 | 16 | 17 | 18 | Pos. | Points |
|---|---|---|---|---|---|---|---|---|---|---|---|---|---|---|---|---|---|---|---|---|---|
| 2007 | Josef Kaufmann Racing | **OSC**; **1**; 3 | **OSC**; **2**; 2 | LAU; 1; 3 | LAU; 2; 4 | NOR; 1; 4 | NOR; 2; 4 | NÜR; 1; 5 | NÜR; 2; 5 | ZAN; 1; 8 | ZAN; 2; 5 | OSC; 1; 4 | **OSC**; **2**; 1 | NÜR; 1; 6 | **NÜR**; **2**; 1 | CAT; 1; 21† | CAT; 2; 2 | HOC; 1; 4 | HOC; 2 DSQ | 5th | 570 |

=== Complete Formula BMW Europe results ===
(key) (Races in bold indicate pole position; races in italics indicate fastest lap)

| Year | Entrant | 1 | 2 | 3 | 4 | 5 | 6 | 7 | 8 | 9 | 10 | 11 | 12 | 13 | 14 | 15 | 16 | DC | Points |
|---|---|---|---|---|---|---|---|---|---|---|---|---|---|---|---|---|---|---|---|
| 2008 | Josef Kaufmann Racing | CAT; 1; 4 | CAT; 2; 5 | ZOL; 1; 3 | ZOL; 2; 2 | SIL; 1; 5 | SIL; 2; 5 | HOC; 1; 3 | HOC; 2; 3 | HUN; 1; 2 | HUN; 2; 3 | VSC; 1; 3 | VSC; 2; 2 | **SPA**; **1**; 1 | SPA; 2; 6 | MNZ; 1; 3 | MNZ; 2; 2 | 2nd | 327 |

=== Complete Formula 3 Euro Series results ===
(key) (Races in bold indicate pole position; races in italics indicate fastest lap)

| Year | Entrant | Engine | 1 | 2 | 3 | 4 | 5 | 6 | 7 | 8 | 9 | 10 | 11 | 12 | 13 | 14 | 15 | 16 | 17 | 18 | 19 | 20 | 21 | 22 | 23 | 24 | 25 | 26 | 27 | DC | Points |
|---|---|---|---|---|---|---|---|---|---|---|---|---|---|---|---|---|---|---|---|---|---|---|---|---|---|---|---|---|---|---|---|
| 2009 | Mücke Motorsport | Mercedes | HOC; 1; 12 | HOC; 2 Ret | LAU; 1; 22 | LAU; 2; 9 | NOR; 1; 10 | NOR; 2; 17 | ZAN; 1; 12 | ZAN; 2; 10 | OSC; 1; 10 | OSC; 2; 17 | NÜR; 1; 13 | NÜR; 2; 9 | BRH; 1; 14 | BRH; 2; 10 | CAT; 1; 18 | CAT; 2; 17 | DIJ; 1; 11 | DIJ; 2 Ret | HOC; 1; 7 | HOC; 2; 4 | | | | | | | | 16th | 6 |
| 2010 | Signature | Volkswagen | LEC; 1; 2 | LEC; 2; 3 | **HOC**; **1**; 1 | HOC; 2; 4 | VAL; 1; 11 | VAL; 2; 7 | NOR; 1; 2 | NOR; 2; 2 | NÜR; 1; 5 | NÜR; 2; 2 | ZAN; 1; 3 | ZAN; 2; 6 | BRH; 1; 3 | BRH; 2; 5 | OSC; 1; 7 | OSC; 2; 2 | HOC; 1; 3 | HOC; 2; 7 | | | | | | | | | | 2nd | 76 |
| 2011 | Signature | Volkswagen | LEC; 1; 5 | LEC; 2; 2 | LEC; 3; 3 | HOC; 1; 2 | HOC; 2; 3 | **HOC**; **3**; 2 | ZAN; 1; 10 | ZAN; 2; 6 | **ZAN**; **3**; 1 | RBR; 1; 3 | RBR; 2; 11 | RBR; 3 Ret | **NOR**; **1**; 3 | NOR; 2; 1 | **NOR**; **3**; 1 | NÜR; 1; 6 | NÜR; 2; 11 | NÜR; 3; 6 | SIL; 1; 2 | SIL; 2; 10 | SIL; 3; 1 | VAL; 1; 6 | VAL; 2; 1 | VAL; 3; 5 | HOC; 1; 4 | HOC; 2; 4 | HOC; 3; 4 | 2nd | 285 |

=== Complete 24 Hours of Nürburgring results ===
| Year | Team | Co-Drivers | Car | Class | Laps | Pos. | Class Pos. |
|---|---|---|---|---|---|---|---|
| 2012 | (Germany) BMW Team Vita4One | (Sweden) Richard Göransson (Germany) Jens Klingmann (Portugal) Pedro Lamy | BMW Z4 GT3 | SP9 GT3 | 150 | 9th | 9th |
| 2014 | (Belgium) BMW Sports Trophy Team Marc VDS | (Germany) Uwe Alzen (Belgium) Maxime Martin (Germany) Jörg Müller | BMW Z4 GT3 | SP9 GT3 | 60 | DNF | DNF |
| 2015 | (Germany) BMW Sports Trophy Team Schubert | (Germany) Dirk Müller (United Kingdom) Alexander Sims (Germany) Dirk Werner | BMW Z4 GT3 | SP9 GT3 | 47 | DNF | DNF |
| 2016 | (Germany) Schubert Motorsport | (Brazil) Augusto Farfus (Finland) Jesse Krohn (Germany) Jörg Müller | BMW M6 GT3 | SP9 | 60 | NC | NC |
| 2017 | (Germany) BMW Team Schnitzer | (United Kingdom) Tom Blomqvist (Brazil) Augusto Farfus (Germany) Martin Tomczyk | BMW M6 GT3 | SP9 | 158 | 4th | 4th |
| 2019 | (Germany) Rowe Racing | (Netherlands) Nicky Catsburg (United States) John Edwards (Finland) Jesse Krohn | BMW M6 GT3 | SP9 | 8 | DNF | DNF |
| 2020 | (Germany) Rowe Racing | (Austria) Lucas Auer (United Kingdom) Tom Blomqvist (Austria) Philipp Eng | BMW M6 GT3 | SP9 | 85 | 4th | 4th |
| 2021 | (Germany) Rowe Racing | (United States) Connor De Phillippi (Germany) Martin Tomczyk (South Africa) Sheldon van der Linde | BMW M6 GT3 | SP9 | 59 | **2nd** | **2nd** |
| 2022 | (Germany) Rowe Racing | (Netherlands) Nicky Catsburg (United States) John Edwards (South Africa) Sheldon van der Linde | BMW M4 GT3 | SP9 Pro | 47 | DNF | DNF |
| 2023 | (Germany) Rowe Racing | (Belgium) Maxime Martin (South Africa) Sheldon van der Linde (Belgium) Dries Vanthoor | BMW M4 GT3 | SP9 Pro | 162 | **2nd** | **2nd** |
| 2024 | (Germany) Rowe Racing | (Brazil) Augusto Farfus (Switzerland) Raffaele Marciello (Belgium) Maxime Martin | BMW M4 GT3 | SP9 Pro | 50 | 7th | 7th |
| 2026 | (Germany) Schubert Motorsport | (Austria) Philipp Eng (Netherlands) Robin Frijns (Belgium) Charles Weerts | BMW M4 GT3 Evo | SP9 Pro | 154 | 8th | 7th |

=== Complete Deutsche Tourenwagen Masters results ===
(key) (Races in bold indicate pole position) (Races in italics indicate fastest lap)

| Year | Team | Car | 1 | 2 | 3 | 4 | 5 | 6 | 7 | 8 | 9 | 10 | 11 | 12 | 13 | 14 | 15 | 16 | 17 | 18 | 19 | 20 | Pos. | Points |
|---|---|---|---|---|---|---|---|---|---|---|---|---|---|---|---|---|---|---|---|---|---|---|---|---|
| 2013 | BMW Team MTEK | BMW M3 DTM | HOC; 9 | BRH; 4 | SPL; 2 | LAU; 21† | NOR; 10 | MSC; 15 | NÜR; 7 | OSC; 12 | **ZAN**; 5 | HOC; DSQ | | | | | | | | | | | 8th | 49 |
| 2014 | BMW Team RMG | BMW M4 DTM | HOC; 1 | **OSC**; 19 | **HUN**; 1 | NOR; 6 | MSC; 4 | SPL; 1 | **NÜR**; 1 | LAU; 6 | ZAN; 2 | HOC; 5 | | | | | | | | | | | 1st | 156 |
| 2015 | BMW Team RMG | BMW M4 DTM | HOC; 1; 9 | HOC; 2; 5 | LAU; 1; 13 | LAU; 2; 17 | NOR; 1; 9 | NOR; 2; 13 | ZAN; 1; 1 | ZAN; 2; 5 | SPL; 1; 9 | SPL; 2; 11 | **MSC**; **1**; 2 | MSC; 2; 7 | OSC; 1; 6 | OSC; 2; 3 | NÜR; 1; 7 | NÜR; 2; 18 | HOC; 1; 6 | HOC; 2 Ret | | | 6th | 112 |
| 2016 | BMW Team RMG | BMW M4 DTM | HOC; 1; 16 | HOC; 2; 8 | **SPL**; **1**; 1 | SPL; 2; 7 | LAU; 1; 4 | LAU; 2; 6 | NOR; 1; 4 | NOR; 2; 6 | ZAN; 1; 2 | ZAN; 2; 4 | MSC; 1; 19 | **MSC**; **2**; 1 | **NÜR**; **1**; 1 | NÜR; 2; 3 | HUN; 1; 7 | HUN; 2 DSQ | HOC; 1; 2 | HOC; 2; 4 | | | 1st | 206 |
| 2017 | BMW Team RMG | BMW M4 DTM | HOC; 1; 10 | HOC; 2; 3 | LAU; 1; 13 | LAU; 2; 9 | HUN; 1; 8 | HUN; 2 Ret | NOR; 1; 4 | NOR; 2; 5 | MSC; 1; 3 | MSC; 2; 6 | ZAN; 1; 2 | ZAN; 2 DSQ | NÜR; 1; 9 | **NÜR**; **2**; 3 | SPL; 1; 5 | SPL; 2; 6 | HOC; 1; 13 | HOC; 2; 1 | | | 5th | 160 |
| 2018 | BMW Team RMG | BMW M4 DTM | HOC; 1; 11 | HOC; 2; 11 | LAU; 1; 7 | LAU; 2; 2 | HUN; 1; 16 | HUN; 2; 1 | NOR; 1; 3 | NOR; 2; 1 | ZAN; 1; 7 | ZAN; 2; 17 | BRH; 1; 9 | BRH; 2; 5 | MIS; 1; 9 | MIS; 2; 13 | NÜR; 1; 5 | NÜR; 2; 3 | SPL; 1; 7 | SPL; 2; 14 | HOC; 1 Ret | **HOC**; **2**; 2 | 4th | 164 |
| 2019 | BMW Team RMG | BMW M4 Turbo DTM | **HOC**; **1**; 1 | HOC; 2; 8 | **ZOL**; **1**; 7 | ZOL; 2; 13 | MIS; 1; 1 | MIS; 2 Ret | NOR; 1; 8 | NOR; 2; 16† | **ASS**; **1**; 1 | ASS; 2; 2 | **BRH**; **1**; 1 | BRH; 2; 10 | LAU; 1; 4 | LAU; 2; 6 | NÜR; 1; 3 | NÜR; 2 Ret | HOC; 1; 2 | HOC; 2; 12 | | | 3rd | 202 |
| 2020 | BMW Team RMG | BMW M4 Turbo DTM | SPA; 1; 11 | SPA; 2; 10 | LAU; 1; 4 | LAU; 2; 3 | LAU; 1; 5 | LAU; 2; 9 | ASS; 1; 14 | ASS; 2; 8 | NÜR; 1; 3 | NÜR; 2; 9 | NÜR; 1; 3 | NÜR; 2; 5 | ZOL; 1; 15† | ZOL; 2; 8 | ZOL; 1; 10 | ZOL; 2; 8 | HOC; 1 Ret | HOC; 2; 11 | | | 9th | 95 |
| 2021 | Walkenhorst Motorsport | BMW M6 GT3 | MNZ; 1; 8 | MNZ; 2; 5 | LAU; 1; 7 | LAU; 2; 6 | ZOL; 1; 5^{3} | **ZOL**; **2**; 1^{1} | NÜR; 1; 5^{3} | NÜR; 2; 3^{3} | RBR; 1; 7 | **RBR**; **2**; 2^{1} | ASS; 1; 1^{2} | ASS; 2; 3^{2} | HOC; 1 Ret | HOC; 2; 11 | NOR; 1; 12 | NOR; 2; 7 | | | | | 4th | 171 |
| 2022 | Walkenhorst Motorsport | BMW M4 GT3 | ALG; 1 NC | ALG; 2; 4 | LAU; 1 Ret | LAU; 2; 10 | IMO; 1; 7 | IMO; 2; 3^{3} | NOR; 1 Ret | NOR; 2; 4^{3} | NÜR; 1; 8 | NÜR; 2; 10 | SPA; 1; 9 | SPA; 2; 9 | RBR; 1; 14 | RBR; 2; 12 | HOC; 1; 3 | HOC; 2; 1 | | | | | 8th | 98 |
| 2023 | Project 1 Motorsport | BMW M4 GT3 | OSC; 1 Ret | OSC; 2; 18 | ZAN; 1; 5^{3} | ZAN; 2; 4 | NOR; 1; 9 | NOR; 2; 13 | NÜR; 1; 6 | NÜR; 2; 15 | LAU; 1; 10 | LAU; 2; 10 | SAC; 1; 18 | SAC; 2; 12 | RBR; 1; 8 | RBR; 2; 4 | HOC; 1; 9 | HOC; 2; 17 | | | | | 13th | 91 |
| 2024 | Schubert Motorsport | BMW M4 GT3 | OSC; 1 Ret | OSC; 2; 10 | LAU; 1; 13 | LAU; 2; 9 | ZAN; 1; 7 | ZAN; 2; 1 | NOR; 1; 12 | NOR; 2; 11 | NÜR; 1; 6 | NÜR; 2; 3^{3} | SAC; 1; 13 | SAC; 2 DSQ | RBR; 1 Ret | RBR; 2; 11 | HOC; 1; 9 | HOC; 2; 7 | | | | | 12th | 110 |
| 2025 | Schubert Motorsport | BMW M4 GT3 Evo | OSC; 1; 8 | OSC; 2; 6 | LAU; 1; 5 | LAU; 2; 8^{2} | ZAN; 1; 6 | ZAN; 2; 2^{3} | NOR; 1; 18 | NOR; 2 Ret | NÜR; 1; 5 | NÜR; 2; 2 | SAC; 1; 7 | SAC; 2; 4 | **RBR**; **1**; 2^{1} | RBR; 2; 12 | HOC; 1; 18 | HOC; 2; 2 | | | | | 5th | 170 |
| 2026 | Schubert Motorsport | BMW M4 GT3 Evo | RBR; 1; 5 | RBR; 2; 2 | ZAN; 1; 11 | ZAN; 2; 3 | LAU; 1; 5 | LAU; 2; 8 | NOR; 1 Ret | NOR; 2; 10 | OSC; 1 Ret | OSC; 2; 3^{3} | NÜR; 1; 3 | NÜR; 2; 1 | **SAC**; **1**; 1^{1} | SAC; 2; 6 | HOC; 1; 3 | HOC; 2; 7 | | | | | 3rd | 198 |

^{†} Driver did not finish, but completed 75% of the race distance.

=== Complete IMSA SportsCar Championship results ===
(key) (Races in bold indicate pole position; races in italics indicate fastest lap)

| Year | Entrant | Class | Make | Engine | 1 | 2 | 3 | 4 | 5 | 6 | 7 | 8 | 9 | 10 | 11 | Rank | Points |
|---|---|---|---|---|---|---|---|---|---|---|---|---|---|---|---|---|---|
| 2016 | Turner Motorsport | GTD | BMW M6 GT3 | BMW 4.4 L V8 | DAY; 22 | SEB | LGA | BEL | WGL | MOS | LIM | ELK | VIR | AUS | PET | 63th | 10 |
| 2021 | BMW Team RLL | GTLM | BMW M8 GTE | BMW S63 4.0 L Turbo V8 | DAY; 3 | SEB | DET | WGL | WGL | LIM | ELK | LGA | LBH | VIR | PET | 12th | 325 |
| 2022 | BMW M Team RLL | GTD Pro | BMW M4 GT3 | BMW S58B30T0 3.0 L Twin Turbo I6 | DAY; 9 | SEB; 4 | LBH | LGA | WGL | MOS | LIM | ELK | VIR | PET | | 20th | 542 |
| 2023 | BMW M Team RLL | GTP | BMW M Hybrid V8 | BMW P66/3 4.0 L Turbo V8 | DAY; 6 | SEB; 8 | LBH | LGA | WGL | MOS | ELK | IMS | PET; 8 | | | 16th | 789 |
| 2025 | BMW M Team RLL | GTP | BMW M Hybrid V8 | BMW P66/3 4.0 L turbo V8 | DAY; 7 | SEB; 5 | LBH; 5 | LGA; 4 | DET; 7 | WGL; 12 | ELK; 2 | IMS; 6 | PET; 11 | | | 8th | 2469 |
| 2026 | BMW M Team WRT | GTP | BMW M Hybrid V8 | BMW P66/3 4.0 L turbo V8 | DAY; 8 | SEB; 10 | LBH; 11 | LGA; 3 | DET; 2 | WGL; 9 | ELK; 7 | IMS; 10 | PET; 11 | | | 13th | 2338 |

=== Complete Bathurst 12 Hour results ===
| Year | Team | Co-Drivers | Car | Class | Laps | Pos. | Class Pos. |
|---|---|---|---|---|---|---|---|
| 2017 | (New Zealand) BMW Team SRM | (New Zealand) Steven Richards (Australia) Mark Winterbottom | BMW M6 GT3 | APP | 281 | 14th | 7th |
| 2018 | (Germany) BMW Team Schnitzer | (Brazil) Augusto Farfus (Australia) Chaz Mostert | BMW M6 GT3 | APP | 217 | DNF | DNF |

=== Complete 24 Hours of Spa results ===
| Year | Team | Co-Drivers | Car | Class | Laps | Pos. | Class Pos. |
|---|---|---|---|---|---|---|---|
| 2018 | (Germany) Rowe Racing | (United Kingdom) Ricky Collard (Finland) Jesse Krohn | BMW M6 GT3 | Pro | 194 | DNF | DNF |
| 2021 | (Germany) Walkenhorst Motorsport | (United Kingdom) David Pittard (South Africa) Sheldon van der Linde | BMW M6 GT3 | Pro | 221 | DNF | DNF |
| 2023 | (Germany) ROWE Racing | (Austria) Philipp Eng (United Kingdom) Nick Yelloly | BMW M4 GT3 | Pro | 537 | **1st** | **1st** |
| 2024 | (Germany) ROWE Racing | (Austria) Philipp Eng (United Kingdom) Nick Yelloly | BMW M4 GT3 | Pro | 71 | DNF | DNF |
| 2025 | (Belgium) Team WRT | (Belgium) Dries Vanthoor (South Africa) Sheldon van der Linde | BMW M4 GT3 Evo | Pro | 548 | 8th | 8th |

=== Complete FIA World Endurance Championship results ===
(key) (Races in bold indicate pole position) (Races in italics indicate fastest lap)

| Year | Entrant | Class | Car | Engine | 1 | 2 | 3 | 4 | 5 | 6 | 7 | 8 | Rank | Points |
|---|---|---|---|---|---|---|---|---|---|---|---|---|---|---|
| 2024 | BMW M Team WRT | Hypercar | BMW M Hybrid V8 | BMW P66/3 4.0 L Turbo V8 | QAT; 14 | IMO; DSQ | SPA; 11 | LMS; Ret | SÃO; 9 | COA; 8 | FUJ; 2 | BHR; 5 | 14th | 39 |
| 2025 | BMW M Team WRT | Hypercar | BMW M Hybrid V8 | BMW P66/3 4.0 L Turbo V8 | QAT | IMO | SPA | LMS | SÃO; 5 | COA | FUJ | BHR | 24th | 10 |

=== Complete 24 Hours of Le Mans results ===
| Year | Team | Co-Drivers | Car | Class | Laps | Pos. | Class Pos. |
|---|---|---|---|---|---|---|---|
| 2024 | (Belgium) BMW M Team WRT | (Switzerland) Raffaele Marciello (Belgium) Dries Vanthoor | BMW M Hybrid V8 | Hypercar | 102 | DNF | DNF |

Sporting positions
| Preceded by Mike Rockenfeller | Deutsche Tourenwagen Masters; Champion; 2014 | Succeeded by Pascal Wehrlein |
| Preceded by Pascal Wehrlein | Deutsche Tourenwagen Masters; Champion; 2016 | Succeeded by René Rast |
