= Kotaro Sakurai =

Japanese racing driver

- Nationality: Japanese
- Born: 29 June 1994 (age 32) Tokyo, Japan

Previous series
- 2012 2011 2011 2010: GP3 Series; British F3 Rookie Class; Toyota Racing Series; Formula BMW Pacific

Championship titles
- 2011: British F3 Rookie Class

Kotaro Sakurai (桜井孝太郎, Sakurai Kōtarō; born 29 June 1994 in Tokyo) is a Japanese former racing driver. Sakurai raced under Filipino license in Formula BMW Pacific and in the GP3 Series.

== Career ==
=== Karting ===
Sakurai began his racing career in karting at the age of nine and raced in Japan and Australia.

=== Formula BMW Pacific ===
In 2010, Sakurai graduated to single–seaters into the Formula BMW Pacific series in Asia, joining Eurasia Motorsport and racing under a Filipino racing licence. He scored a podium in the second race of the opening round at Sepang and achieved seven more point-scoring finishes on his way to eighth in the championship.

=== Toyota Racing Series ===
Sakurai participated in the Toyota Racing Series in early 2011 with M2 Competition, finishing fourteenth in the championship, the lowest-placed of the International Trophy drivers to contest the series.

=== Formula Three ===
In 2011, Sakurai decided to race in Europe, taking part in the rebranded Rookie Class of the British Formula 3 Championship with Hitech Racing. Bart Hylkema was his only class rival in the first half of the championship, before he graduated to the International Class, allowing Sakurai to take the championship title. During the season, he also appeared in the Brands Hatch round of the European F3 Open Championship.

=== GP3 Series ===
Sakurai raced in the GP3 Series in 2012 with Status Grand Prix.

== Racing record ==
=== Career summary ===
Season	Series	Team	Races	Wins	Poles	FLaps	Podiums	Points	Position
2010	Formula BMW Pacific	Eurasia Motorsport	15	0	2	0	3	68	8th
2011	British Formula 3 International Series - Rookie	Hitech Racing	28	15	10	18	23	378	**1st**
2011	Toyota Racing Series	M2 Competition	12	0	0	0	0	325	14th
2011	European F3 Open Championship	Team West-Tec	2	0	0	0	0	0	22nd
2012	GP3 Series	Status Grand Prix	6	0	0	0	0	0	24th
2012	Auto GP World Series	Euronova Racing	2	0	0	0	0	6	19th
2013-14	MRF Challenge Formula 2000 Championship	MRF Racing	3	0	0	0	0	0	NC
2019	F4 Japanese Championship	Zap Speed	12	0	0	0	0	12	14th

=== Complete GP3 Series results ===
(key) (Races in bold indicate pole position) (Races in italics indicate fastest lap)

Year	Entrant	1	2	3	4	5	6	7	8	9	10	11	12	13	14	15	16	DC	Points
2012	Status Grand Prix	CAT; FEA; 18	CAT; SPR; 12	MON; FEA; 13	MON; SPR; 20	VAL; FEA	VAL; SPR	SIL; FEA; 15	SIL; SPR; 13	HOC; FEA	HOC; SPR	HUN; FEA	HUN; SPR	SPA; FEA	SPA; SPR	MNZ; FEA	MNZ; SPR	24th	0

Sporting positions
Preceded by Menasheh Idafar; British F3 National Class	British Formula 3 Rookie Champion; 2011	Succeeded by Spike Goddard
