= 2014 Monaco GP2 Series round =

Pair of motor races held as part of the GP2 Series

2014 Monaco GP2 round
Round details
- Round 3 of 11 rounds in the 2014 GP2 Series
- Layout of the Circuit de Monaco
- Location: Circuit de Monaco, Monte Carlo, Monaco
- Course: Street circuit 3.340 km (2.075 mi)

GP2 Series

Feature race
- Date: 23 May 2014
- Laps: 40

Pole position
Driver	(United Kingdom) Jolyon Palmer	DAMS
- Time: 1:20.774

Podium
First	(United Kingdom) Jolyon Palmer	DAMS
Second	(New Zealand) Mitch Evans	RT Russian Time
Third	(Brazil) Felipe Nasr	Carlin

Fastest lap
Driver	(United Kingdom) Jolyon Palmer	DAMS
- Time: 1:23.008 (on lap 19)

Sprint race
- Date: 24 May 2014
- Laps: 30

Podium
First	(Monaco) Stéphane Richelmi	DAMS
Second	(Spain) Sergio Canamasas	Trident
Third	(Indonesia) Rio Haryanto	EQ8 Caterham Racing

Fastest lap
Driver	(Monaco) Stefano Coletti	Racing Engineering
- Time: 1:23.331 (on lap 9)

The 2014 Monaco GP2 Series round was a pair of motor races held as part of the GP2 Series on 23 and 24 May 2014 at the Circuit de Monaco in Monte Carlo, Monaco. It was the third round of the 2014 GP2 Series and was run in support of the 2014 Monaco Grand Prix. The first event, a 40-lap feature race, was won by DAMS driver Jolyon Palmer who started from pole position. Mitch Evans finished second for Russian Time and Carlin's Felipe Nasr took third. Palmer's teammate Stéphane Richelmi won the shorter 30-lap sprint race from second the following day, ahead of Trident driver Sergio Canamasas and Rio Haryanto of Caterham Racing.

Palmer won the pole position for the feature race by setting the fastest lap in qualifying but Evans made a brisk getaway to take the lead. Evans lost grip in his super soft compound tyres and Palmer overtook him for the lead at the start of lap 11. Palmer kept the lead for most of the remaining 29 laps to win the race with the first three finishers separated by six-tenths of a second. Richelmi started from pole position in the sprint race and held off Haryanto to lead into Sainte Devote. Richelmi withstood race-long pressure from Canamasas to achieve his maiden GP2 Series victory on his 54th attempt.

The results increased Palmer's advantage atop the Drivers' Championship to 46 points ober Nasr who gained second as a result of finishing second in the feature race. Johnny Cecotto Jr. passed Julián Leal, who scored no points in both races and fell to fourth. Arthur Pic was fifth with 40 points. DAMS now led the Teams' Championship with 135 points and Carlin were demoted to second with 30 less points. Trident and Campos Racing were third and fourth with eight rounds left in the season.

== Background ==
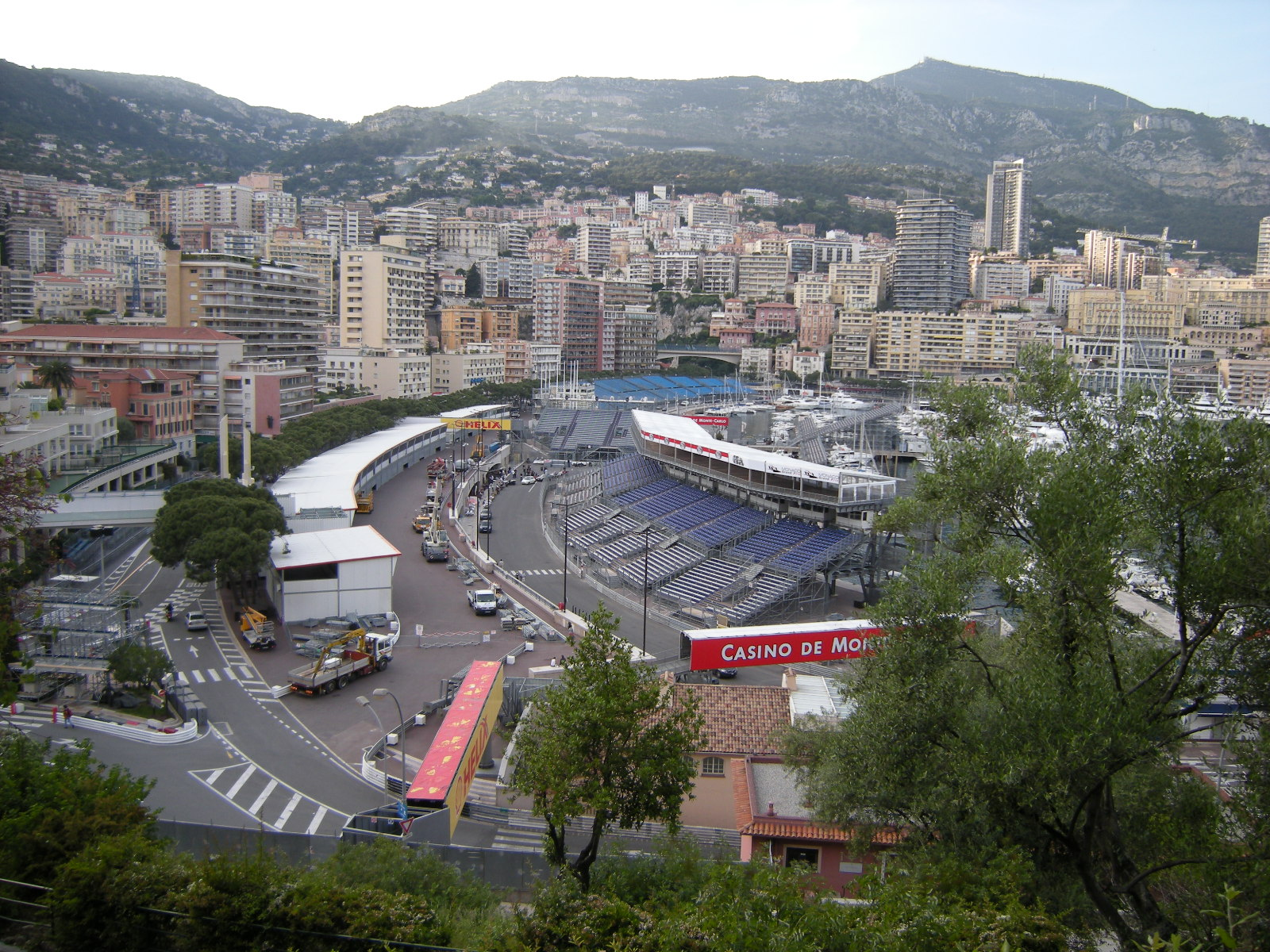
Circuit de Monaco, where the race was held.

The 2014 Monaco GP2 Series round was the third of eleven scheduled events in 2014. It was held on 23 and 24 May 2014 at the Circuit de Monaco, Monte Carlo, Monaco and supported the 2014 Monaco Grand Prix. Tyre supplier Pirelli brought two types of tyre to the race: two dry compounds (red banded super-soft "options" and yellow-banded soft "primes"). There were 13 teams entering two drivers each for the round for a total of 26 competitors and all of them piloted the Dallara GP2/11 vehicle.

Before the round, DAMS driver Jolyon Palmer led the Drivers' Championship with 70 points, 22 ahead of Julián Leal in second, who was followed in turn, by a further six points behind third-placed Felipe Nasr. Johnny Cecotto Jr. was fourth on 29 points, and Arthur Pic was a further three points behind in fifth place. Carlin were leading the Teams' Championship with 90 points; their nearest rival DAMS stood seven points adrift in second place. ART Grand Prix were third with 33 points with Trident (29) and Campos Racing (26) in fourth and fifth.

== Practice and qualifying ==
One 45 minute morning practice session was held on Thursday afternoon. During the session, held in mixed and cold weather as rain swept through the area, Palmer lapped fastest with a time of 1:20.707, three-tenths of a second faster than Cecotto (Trident) in second. The rest of the top ten were Stéphane Richelmi (DAMS), Stefano Coletti (Racing Engineering), Mitch Evans (Russian Time), Sergio Canamasas (Trident), Rio Haryanto (Caterham Racing), Nasr, Leal (both Carlin) and Alexander Rossi (Caterham Racing). Nathanaël Berthon (Lazarus) crashed into the Anthony Noghes corner wall as he began his first quick lap. Canamasas locked his brakes going downhill and went onto a run-off area. He continued by reversing onto the track. Nasr was on a fast timed lap and stopped the session temporarily when he braked later than expected, became airborne driving over the Novelle chicane kerbs, and struck the outside barrier. Marshals were needed to move his damaged car from the barriers. As cars bunched up in the session's closing minutes, the front wing of Evans's car lodged itself in the rear of André Negrão's (Arden International) car in the track's final corners.

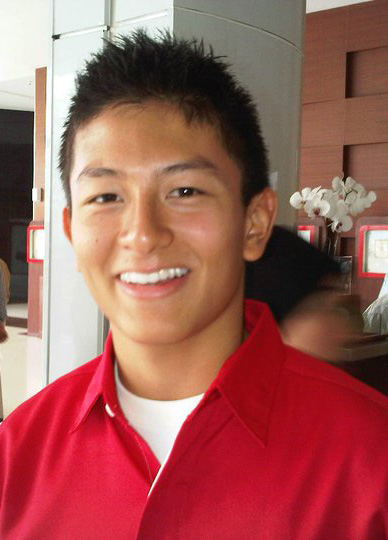
Rio Haryanto (pictured in 2011) qualified second, his best qualifying of the season.

Friday afternoon's qualifying session ran for 30 minutes. Qualifying was divided into two groups of 13 cars, with odd numbered cars in Group A and even numbered vehicles in Group B. The drivers' fastest lap times determined the starting order for the first race. The pole position winner took four points towards the Drivers' and Teams' Championships. The track had mostly dried after rain affected the second practice session for the Monaco Grand Prix. Although a few minor damp patches were present, wet-weather tyres were not used by anybody but traffic was a factor due to the tight nature of the circuit. Palmer opted for a strategy to record his lap midway through qualifying for overall pole position with a benchmark lap of 1:20.774. Second place on the grid was originally Haryanto who set the best lap late in Group B and was nearly seven-tenths slower, but he was penalised with a three-place grid penalty for blocking other drivers during the session. Evans' team waited until he had clear space but was caught in traffic on his last lap on new tyres and took third. Richelmi followed his teammate Palmer's strategy and went faster on his last lap to go fourth. Two-time Monaco pole sitter Cecotto in fifth wore out his tyres and could not go faster.

Stoffel Vandoorne (ART Grand Prix) was another who improved and placed sixth. Daniel Abt (Hilmer Motorsport) was provisionally seventh and Racing Engineering teammates Coletti and Raffaele Marciello were eighth and ninth. Leal rounded out the top ten provisional qualifiers. Rossi in 11th was the fastest driver not to qualify in the top ten. Behind him, the rest of the provisional grid consisted of Canamasas, Simon Trummer (Rapax), Arthur Pic (Campos), Nasr, René Binder (Arden International), Kimiya Sato (Campos), Adrian Quaife-Hobbs (Rapax), Tio Ellinas (MP Motorsport), Facu Regalia (Hilmer Motorsport), Conor Daly (Lazarus), Daniël de Jong (MP Motorsport), Negrão, Berthon, Takuya Izawa (ART Grand Prix) and Artem Markelov (Russian Time). After qualifying, Abt was deemed to have impeded Cecotto and Negrão at two separate points of the track and incurred a three-place grid penalty that dropped him from seventh to tenth. Similarly, Haryanto, Regalia and Nasr were penalised for the same thing and Markelov was mandated to begin from the pit lane to take a grid penalty he received for causing a collision in the Catalunya sprint race.

=== Qualifying classification ===
==== Group A ====
Pos.	No.	Driver	Team	Time	Grid
1	7	(United Kingdom) Jolyon Palmer	DAMS	1:20.774	1
2	1	(New Zealand) Mitch Evans	RT Russian Time	1:21.188	2
3	23	(Venezuela) Johnny Cecotto Jr.	Trident	1:21.361	4
4	11	(Germany) Daniel Abt	Hilmer Motorsport	1:21.760	10^{1}
5	5	(Italy) Raffaele Marciello	Racing Engineering	1:21.919	8
6	19	(United States) Alexander Rossi	EQ8 Caterham Racing	1:22.146	11
7	15	(Switzerland) Simon Trummer	Rapax	1:22.296	13
8	3	(Brazil) Felipe Nasr	Carlin	1:22.381	18^{1}
9	27	(Japan) Kimiya Sato	Campos Racing	1:22.588	16
10	21	(Cyprus) Tio Ellinas	MP Motorsport	1:22.681	19
11	25	(United States) Conor Daly	Venezuela GP Lazarus	1:22.997	20
12	17	(Brazil) André Negrão	Arden International	1;23.178	22
13	9	(Japan) Takuya Izawa	ART Grand Prix	1:23.259	25

==== Group B ====
Pos.	No.	Driver	Team	Time	Grid
1	18	(Indonesia) Rio Haryanto	EQ8 Caterham Racing	1:21.433	5^{1}
2	8	(Monaco) Stéphane Richelmi	DAMS	1:21.444	3
3	10	(Belgium) Stoffel Vandoorne	ART Grand Prix	1:21.508	6
4	6	(Monaco) Stefano Coletti	Racing Engineering	1:21.649	7
5	4	(Colombia) Julián Leal	Carlin	1:21.752	9
6	22	(Spain) Sergio Canamasas	Trident	1:21.926	12
7	26	(France) Arthur Pic	Campos Racing	1:22.207	14
8	16	(Austria) René Binder	Arden International	1:22,270	15
9	14	(United Kingdom) Adrian Quaife-Hobbs	Rapax	1:22.277	17
10	12	(Argentina) Facu Regalia	Hilmer Motorsport	1:22.478	23^{2}
11	20	(Netherlands) Daniël de Jong	MP Motorsport	1:22.488	21
12	24	(France) Nathanaël Berthon	Venezuela GP Lazarus	1:22.632	24
13	2	(Russia) Artem Markelov	RT Russian Time	1:23.349	26

Notes:

- ^1 — Daniel Abt, Rio Haryanto, Facu Regalia and Felipe Nasr were demoted three-places on the grid for blocking other drivers during qualifying.

== Races ==
The first race was held over 140 km (87 mi) or 60 minutes (which ever came first) and the regulations required drivers to make one pit stop. The first ten finishers scored points, with two given to the fastest lap holder. The grid for the second race was determined by the finishing order of the first but with the first eight drivers in reverse order of where they finished. It was run for 100 km (62 mi) or 45 minutes (which ever came first) and, in contrast to the first race, drivers were not required to make pit stops. The top eight finishers earned points towards their respective championships.

=== Feature race ===
The first race began in sunny weather with an air temperature of 18 °C (64 °F) and a track temperature of 23 °C (73 °F) at 11:15 Central European Summer Time (UTC+02:00) on 23 May. On the grid, Palmer made a slow start on his soft compound tyres due to wheelspin and lost the lead to Evans on the super soft compound into Sainte Devote turn because Evans's tyres provided him with extra grip. This was in contrast from the year before when a traffic jam brought the race to a halt. Palmer held off a challenge from his teammate Richelmi and the duo were followed by Cecotto, Vandoorne and Coletti. Nasr made the best start in the field, moving from 18th to 12th by the end of the first lap as Evans opened up a one-second advantage over Palmer at the same time. However, Evans was prevented from extending his lead further when the safety car was deployed at the beginning of lap two for Regalia who stopped on the inside at the exit of the Tabac corner with a drive train failure that began at the Novelle chicane. Evans maintained his lead at the lap four restart and Palmer retained second as the top six drivers began to pull away from Haryanto in seventh.

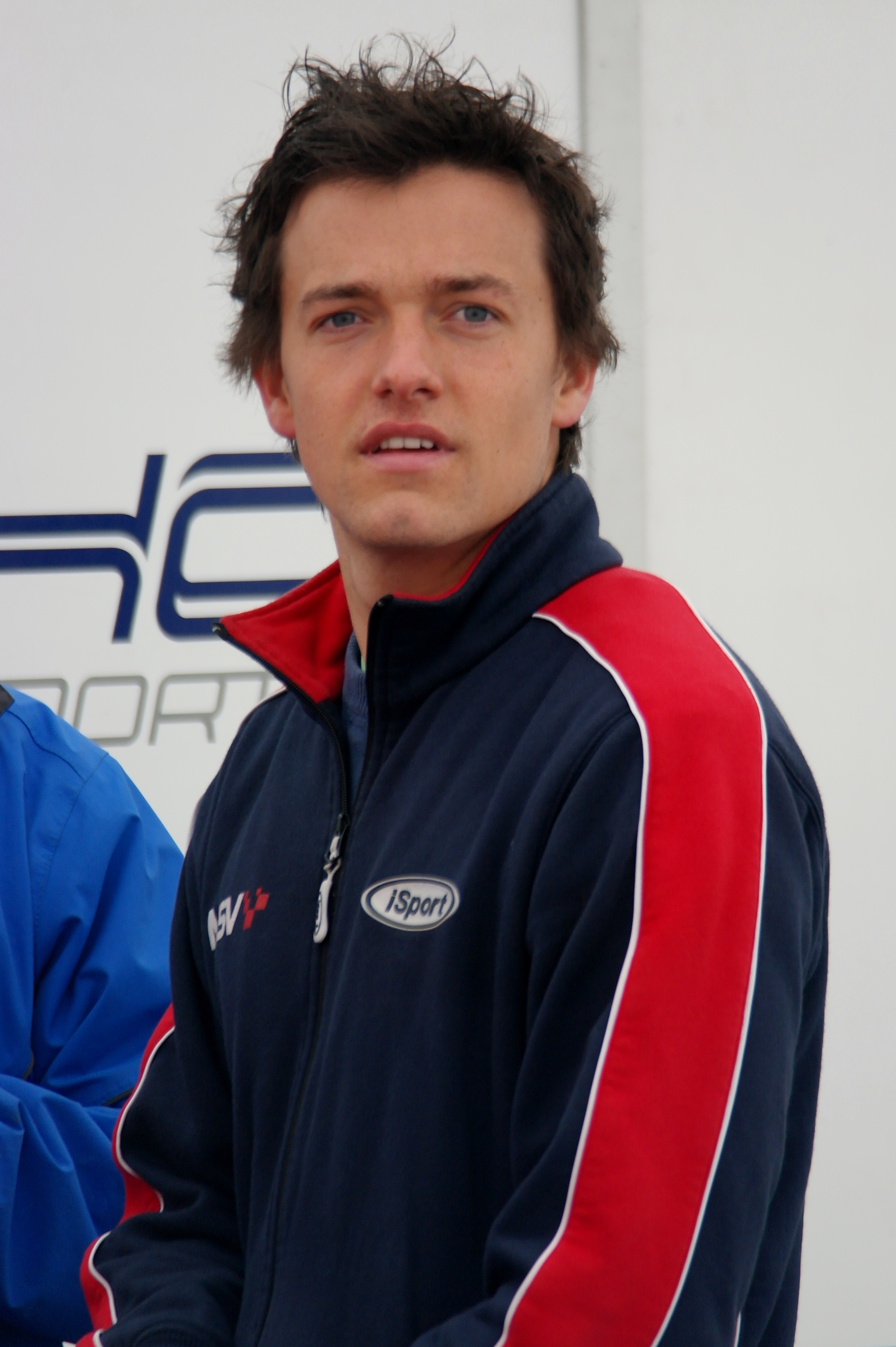
Jolyon Palmer (pictured in 2012) won the feature race after retaking the lead on the eleventh lap by passing Mitch Evans.

Further down the order, Nasr, Pic, Quaife-Hobbs, Canamasas and de Jong made their mandatory pit stops during laps seven and eight as they sought to move up the order through strategy. By this point, Evans lost grip due to worn tyres, allowing Palmer to gradually lower his lead. Palmer took the lead from Evans by turning right entering Sainte Devote corner at the start of the 11th lap. Palmer opened up a two-second lead over Evans before the lap was over. Evans' slow speed allowed Richelmi to close up and a small train of cars formed behind them as Cecotto was behind Richelmi. Abt retired at the Loews hairpin from contact with Rossi on lap 11. On the next lap, a multi-car crash at the Loews hairpin blocked the turn and stopped the race. Binder tapped his teammate Negrão into a spin and blocked the entrance to the corner; he was stranded in the middle of the circuit and created a traffic jam. Markelov could not avoid Negrão and hit his car. Every driver returned to the grid and were permitted to change tyres; the order was rearranged to continue the race. This was despite the engines in some cars such as Rossi's and Richelmi's starting to overheat on the downhill approach to Mirabeau corner while stationary in traffic; their on-board computers went into safe mode. Marshals push started the affected cars down the tunnel and into the Novelle chicane.

The race started half an hour later behind the safety car and the race was run to time instead of laps. Palmer held the lead at the restart and set a series of fastest laps to open out a nine-second lead over Evans. Palmer's main concern, however, was Nasr who made his compulsory pit stop before the stoppage and he required a half a minute advantage over him. The safety car was dispatched for the second time on lap 25 after Leal mistimed an overtake on Marciello and lost control of his car, veering him into the tyre barrier at the exit of the Novelle chicane. This compelled other drivers who had not made their pit stops to do so. Palmer and Evans immediately responded with their mandatory pit stops and emerged ahead of Nasr. Palmer avoided a penalty after he clipped a tyre designated for his teammate Richelmi on the way out of the DAMS pit stall. The tyre rolled down the pit lane and narrowly missed Cecotto's car. Vandoorne chose not to make a pit stop and led at the lap-28 restart with Palmer second. Coletti immediately pressured Canamasas and overtook him at La Racasse corner for sixth. On the next lap, he passed Nasr at Anthony Noghes turn. Coletti promptly overtook Evans and set after the yet-to-stop Trummer in third, who was on worn tyres.

Trummer defended from Coletti; as Coletti tried to overtake Trummer with an analogous move on the inside, the two made contact as Trummer turned in for Anthony Noghes turn. Both cars were sent straight into an outside barrier and retired on lap 32. On the lap, Izawa became the next retiree when he went into the wall at Mirbeau corner. In the meantime, Palmer regained the lead when Vandoorne made his mandatory pit stop on the lap and emerged outside of the top ten. Binder misjudged an overtake on Markelov that put Markelov out at the entry to the Novelle Chiane on lap 36. Binder then retired by going into a barrier at Tabac corner. Markelov's crash prompted course officials to wave yellow flags in and after the chicane. Palmer appeared he would win with a healthy lead but his soft compound tyres degraded in the closing laps. Evans subsequently drew nearer to Palmer but did not risk anything for the win as Nasr was close by and pressured him. The first three crossed the start/finish line after 40 laps covered by six-tenths of a second with Palmer winning, Evans second and Nasr third. Cecotto was a further second adrift in fourth, having held off Canamasas in fifth. Pic and Haryanto were sixth and seventh. Richelmi took eighth and the sprint race pole position. Quaife-Hobbs and Ellinas were ninth and tenth. The final classified finishers were de Jong, Marciello, Daly, Vandoorne, Sato, Rossi and Berthon.

=== Feature race classification ===
Drivers who scored championship points are denoted in bold.

Pos.	No.	Driver	Team	Laps	Time/Retired	Grid	Points
**1**	**7**	**(United Kingdom) Jolyon Palmer**	**DAMS**	**40**	**1:38.31.193**	**1**	25 (4+2)
**2**	**1**	**(New Zealand) Mitch Evans**	**RT Russian Time**	**40**	**+0.427**	**2**	18
**3**	**3**	**(Brazil) Felipe Nasr**	**Carlin**	**40**	**+0.653**	**18**	15
**4**	**23**	**(Venezuela) Johnny Cecotto Jr.**	**Trident**	**40**	**+2.175**	**4**	12
**5**	**22**	**(Spain) Sergio Canamasas**	**Trident**	**40**	**+2.884**	**12**	10
**6**	**26**	**(France) Arthur Pic**	**Campos Racing**	**40**	**+6.187**	**14**	8
**7**	**18**	**(Indonesia) Rio Haryanto**	**EQ8 Caterham Racing**	**40**	**+8.718**	**5**	6
**8**	**8**	**(Monaco) Stéphane Richelmi**	**DAMS**	**40**	**+9.594**	**3**	4
**9**	**14**	**(United Kingdom) Adrian Quaife-Hobbs**	**Rapax**	**40**	**+9.785**	**17**	2
**10**	**21**	**(Cyprus) Tio Ellinas**	**MP Motorsport**	**40**	**+10.187**	**19**	1
11	20	(Netherlands) Daniël de Jong	MP Motorsport	40	+10.687	20	
12	5	(Italy) Raffaele Marciello	Racing Engineering	40	+11.727	8	
13	25	(United States) Conor Daly	Venezuela GP Lazarus	40	+12.291	20	
14	10	(Belgium) Stoffel Vandoorne	ART Grand Prix	40	+12.705	6	
15	27	(Japan) Kimiya Sato	Campos Racing	40	+26.761	16	
16	19	(United States) Alexander Rossi	EQ8 Caterham Racing	40	+29,166	11	
17	24	(France) Nathanaël Berthon	Venezuela GP Lazarus	40	+56.107	24	
Ret	16	(Austria) René Binder	Arden International	35	Collision	15	
Ret	2	(Russia) Artem Markelov	RT Russian Time	35	Collision	26	
Ret	9	(Japan) Takuya Izawa	ART Grand Prix	31	Accident	16	
Ret	15	(Switzerland) Simon Trummer	Rapax	31	Collision	13	
Ret	6	(Monaco) Stefano Coletti	Racing Engineering	31	Collision	7	
Ret	4	(Colombia) Julián Leal	Carlin	24	Accident	9	
Ret	17	(Brazil) André Negrão	Arden International	11	Collision	22	
Ret	11	(Germany) Daniel Abt	Hilmer Motorsport	9	Collision	10	
Ret	12	(Argentina) Facu Regalia	Hilmer Motorsport	0	Drivetrain	23	
Fastest lap: Jolyon Palmer (DAMS) — 1:23.008 (on lap 19)

=== Sprint race ===
After reviewing footage at the conclusion of the feature event, the stewards imposed a five-place grid penalty on Trummer causing the collision with Coletti and Binder incurred the same penalty for hitting Markelov. The second race commenced in sunny weather with respective air and track temperatures of 17 °C (63 °F) and 34 °C (93 °F) at 16:10 local time on 24 May. Richelmi and Haryanto got good starts off the line with the pair alongside each other into Sainte Devote corner. Haryanto was forced wide by Richelmi at the exit of the corner and lost momentum, allowing the fast-starting Canamasas to pass him at the exit of Sainte Devote corner. Canamasas focused on Richelmi as Haryanto began challenging him. On the opening lap, Markelov braked abruptly into Massenet corner and Ellinas could not avoid hitting the rear of his car. Markelov was issued a drive-through penalty for causing the incident, and Ellinas broke his front wing, necessitating multiple visits to the pit lane, putting him a lap behind Richelmi. After a collision with possibly Pic, Nasr then sustained a right-rear puncture at Casino Square turn. He locked his brakes and went straight onto a run-off area at Mirabeau corner to retire.

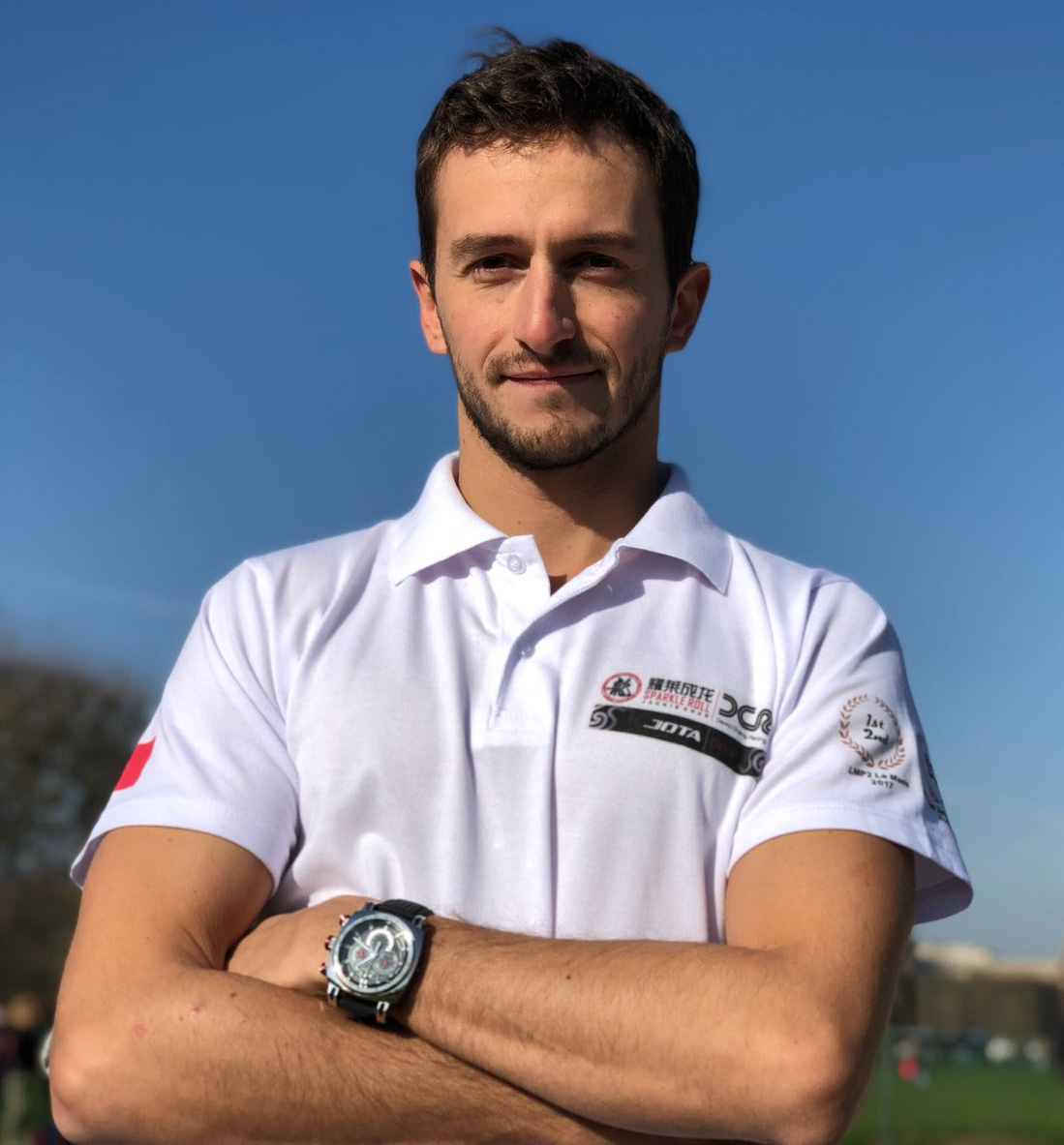
Stéphane Richelmi (pictured in 2018) led every lap of the sprint race to repeat Stefano Coletti's success in the same event from the 2013 round.

Coletti made the best getaway in the field as he went from 19th to 13th by the end of the first lap. On lap three, Marciello earned a drive-through penalty after a driving error while trying to overtake de Jong pushed the latter into a barrier at the Loews hairpin. At the front, Richelmi could not pull away from Canamasas who was close by and pressured him; the two however pulled clear from the quartet of cars composed of Haryanto, Cecotto, Pic and Evans. Palmer was stuck in seventh, ahead of fellow British driver Quaife-Hobbs. Left-front braking problems on Izawa's car caused him to retire on lap 13. On the following lap, Markelov over-drove into Sainte Devote corner and dislodged a TecPro barrier at the exit of the turn. He littered debris on the track and stopped on the right into Beau Rivage turn. The safety car was deployed, reducing Richelmi and Canamasas' lead to nothing. The race restarted on lap 17. Richelmi held off Canamasas and Haryanto held off Cecotto for third. Richelmi and Canamasas distanced Haryanto soon after but the latter had a safe advantage over Cecotto.

Since pit stops were not required, and the weather was dry, it was now a question of who could preserve their tyres the best and whether anybody could overtake cars on degraded tyres. Canamasas out-braked himself for the entry to the Novelle chicane and ran straight across the corner. Canamasas stopped his car to prevent himself from gaining an unfair advantage and returned the lead to Richelmi. Richelmi's lead over Canamasas increased to one second for the first time all race. Although the deficit was soon reduced, Richelmi appeared that he would remain unchallenged. On his 54th attempt, it was Richelmi's maiden GP2 Series victory and DAMS' second consecutive win, repeating Coletti's triumph from the 2013 Monaco sprint race. Second-placed Canamasas secured his first podium result in GP2 but was distanced by Richelmi more than two seconds in the final few laps and Haryanto followed four seconds later in third. Off the podium, Cecotto was two seconds slower and led a large close pack of cars in fourth. Pic, Evans, Palmer and Quaife-Hobbs rounded out the top eight. Coletti, Daly, Rossi, Berthon, Vandoorne, Sato, Negrão, Leal, Abt, Trummer, Marciello, Binder, Regalia and Ellinas were the final classified finishers.

=== Sprint race classification ===
Drivers who scored championship points are denoted in bold.

Pos.	No.	Driver	Team	Laps	Time/Retired	Grid	Points
**1**	**8**	**(Monaco) Stéphane Richelmi**	**DAMS**	**30**	**43:17.087**	**1**	15
**2**	**22**	**(Spain) Sergio Canamasas**	**Trident**	**30**	**+2:179**	**4**	12
**3**	**18**	**(Indonesia) Rio Haryanto**	**EQ8 Caterham Racing**	**30**	**+8.295**	**2**	10
**4**	**23**	**(Venezuela) Johnny Cecotto Jr.**	**Trident**	**30**	**+25.320**	**4**	8
**5**	**26**	**(France) Arthur Pic**	**Campos Racing**	**30**	**+25.753**	**3**	6
**6**	**1**	**(New Zealand) Mitch Evans**	**RT Russian Time**	**30**	**+25.973**	**2**	4
**7**	**7**	**(United Kingdom) Jolyon Palmer**	**DAMS**	**30**	**+26.587**	**8**	2
**8**	**14**	**(United Kingdom) Adrian Quaife-Hobbs**	**Rapax**	**30**	**+26.953**	**9**	1
**9**	**6**	**(Monaco) Stefano Coletti**	**Racing Engineering**	**30**	**+28.473**	**20**	2
10	25	(United States) Conor Daly	Venezuela GP Lazarus	30	+28.721	13	
11	19	(United States) Alexander Rossi	EQ8 Caterham Racing	30	+29.987	16	
12	24	(France) Nathanaël Berthon	Venezuela GP Lazarus	30	+30.105	17	
13	10	(Belgium) Stoffel Vandoorne	ART Grand Prix	30	+30.604	14	
14	27	(Japan) Kimiya Sato	Campos Racing	30	+31.228	15	
15	17	(Brazil) André Negrão	Arden International	30	+31.657	24	
16	4	(Colombia) Julián Leal	Carlin	30	+32.085	21	
17	11	(Germany) Daniel Abt	Hilmer Motorsport	30	+32.582	22	
18	15	(Switzerland) Simon Trummer	Rapax	30	+33.458	26^{2}	
19	5	(Italy) Raffaele Marciello	Racing Engineering	30	+34.328	12	
20	16	(Austria) René Binder	Arden International	30	+35.417	23^{2}	
21	12	(Argentina) Facu Regalia	Hilmer Motorsport	30	+36.078	24	
22	21	(Cyprus) Tio Ellinas	MP Motorsport	29	+1 Lap	10	
Ret	2	(Russia) Artem Markelov	RT Russian Time	12	Accident	18	
Ret	9	(Japan) Takuya Izawa	ART Grand Prix	11	Brakes	19	
Ret	20	(Netherlands) Daniël de Jong	MP Motorsport	2	Collision	11	
Ret	3	(Brazil) Felipe Nasr	Carlin	0	Accident	5	
Fastest lap: Stefano Coletti (Racing Engineering) — 1:23.331 (on lap 9)

Notes:

- **^2** — Simon Trummer and René Binder were demoted five places on the grid after being deemed by the stewards to have caused collisions with Stefano Coletti and Artem Markelov, respectively.

== Post-round ==
The top three drivers in both races appeared on the podium to collect their trophies and in separate press conferences. Palmer said he was unworried about Evans starting on the soft compound tyre and spoke of the importance of passing him after the race stoppage as everybody was on the same strategy. He stated he was frustrated about losing his nine-second lead because of the stoppage, "I was feeling comfortable in the car. The pace was the same as yesterday really. We were very strong." Second-placed Evans said he began on the super soft tyres because he felt it was right decision at the time, "The first two laps were good. I was feeling good in the car. After the safety car, the prime came into play more and the option dropped a lot and my front tyres started to go away. I just really started to struggle. I was trying to hang in there until our target for pit stop." Nasr stated his team put him on an alternative strategy and revealed a slower car delayed him during the pit stops, stopping him from challenging Evans. Nevertheless, he was happy to finish third, "Coming from P18 on the grid it was a great race today. We showed our pace and we showed what we’re here for."

After the sprint race, Richelmi commented he was happy to win and emphasised the need to conserve tyre life around Monaco despite degradation not being a major factor, "I cannot find my words...! We were so disappointed yesterday after the pit stop incident, but it’s like this. It’s racing. For sure, I lost the podium there. Now it’s just amazing to win in front of my friends. It’s really exciting and now I want to take the time to realise what happen and enjoy." Canamasas said he was happy to achieve his first GP2 Series podium and believed it was better to remain calm in the final third of the lap after observing Coletti's and Trummer's feature race crash, "I’m proud of what we did and I think they’ve done a very good job. We got a good start and I was second in the first corner. I tried to push Stéphane for the win, but this second place is already an amazing result." Haryanto said he did all he could to get on the front row and aimed to duel for the win, "I tried my best at the start to get Stéphane but it was really close going into the first corner. Unfortunately, I got a little bit wide to the exit and Canamasas went through. Anyway, third is not a bad place to finish especially here in Monaco."

Due to the result of the round, Palmer extended his lead atop the Drivers' Championship to 46 points from Nasr who moved to second after his feature race result. Cecotto moved to third with 49 points and was one point ahead of the non-scoring Leal in fourth. Pic retained fifth place with 40 points. DAMS took the lead of the Teams' Championship Carlin by 30 points. Trident's results moved them to third with 71 points. Campos Racing took over fourth place with 40 points as ART Grand Prix scored no points in both races and fell to fifth with eight rounds left in the season.

== Standings after the race ==
Drivers' Championship standings

+/–	Pos.	Driver	Points
	1	(United Kingdom) Jolyon Palmer	103
1	2	(Brazil) Felipe Nasr	57
1	3	(Venezuela) Johnny Cecotto Jr.	49
2	4	(Colombia) Julián Leal	48
	5	(France) Arthur Pic	40

Teams' Championship standings

+/–	Pos	Team	Points
1	1	(France) DAMS	135
1	2	(United Kingdom) Carlin	105
1	3	(Italy) Trident	71
1	4	(Spain) Campos Racing	40
2	5	(France) ART Grand Prix	33

- Note: Only the top five positions are included for both sets of standings.

Previous round: 2014 Catalunya GP2 Series round	GP2 Series; 2014 season	Next round: 2014 Red Bull Ring GP2 Series round
Previous round: 2013 Monaco GP2 Series round	Monaco GP2 round	Next round: 2015 Monaco GP2 Series round
