= 2011 British Formula 3 International Series =

Seasons
- ← 2010 2012 →

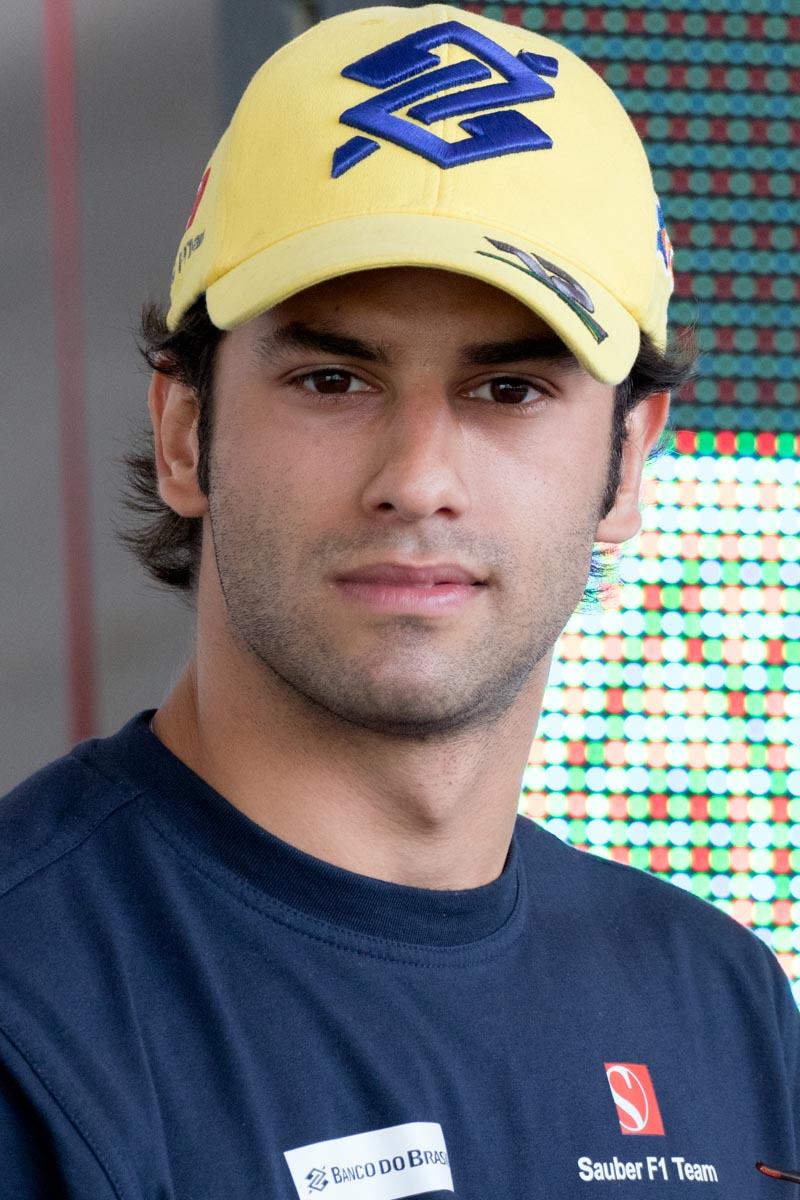
2011 champion, Felipe Nasr

The 2011 Cooper Tires British Formula 3 International Series (an international motor racing series), was the 61st British Formula 3 International Series season. The season began on 16 April at Monza in Italy and ended on 9 October at Silverstone after 30 races held at ten meetings. Of those meetings, six were held in the United Kingdom, with overseas rounds at Monza, the Nürburgring in Germany, Paul Ricard in France, and Spa in Belgium.

Brazilian driver Felipe Nasr dominated the series, winning seven races and recording 16 top three finishes over the first eight rounds of the series, putting him 123 points ahead of Nasr's Carlin Motorsport teammate, Danish driver Kevin Magnussen, giving him an unassailable lead in the championship with two rounds still in hand.

== Regulation changes ==
A number of changes were announced for the season, with pit-stops set to be introduced in the third race of each round, but this plan was later abandoned in July 2011. The championship's class system – Championship and National – was also renamed to the International and Rookie Championships. The Rookie winner will receive a fully paid entry to the 2012 International Championship.

== Drivers and teams ==
Team	Chassis	Engine	No.	Driver	Rounds
International Class
(United Kingdom) Carlin	Dallara F308	Volkswagen	1	(Colombia) Carlos Huertas	All
(United Kingdom) Carlin	Dallara F308	Volkswagen	2	(Denmark) Kevin Magnussen	All
(United Kingdom) Carlin	Dallara F308	Volkswagen	21	(United Kingdom) Rupert Svendsen-Cook	All
(United Kingdom) Carlin	Dallara F308	Volkswagen	22	(Malaysia) Jazeman Jaafar	All
(United Kingdom) Carlin	Dallara F308	Volkswagen	31	(Brazil) Felipe Nasr	All
(United Kingdom) Carlin	Dallara F308	Volkswagen	32	(United Kingdom) Jack Harvey	All
(United Kingdom) Fortec Motorsport	Dallara F311	Mercedes HWA	3	(United Kingdom) William Buller	All
(United Kingdom) Fortec Motorsport	Dallara F311	Mercedes HWA	4	(Brazil) Lucas Foresti	All
(United Kingdom) Fortec Motorsport	Dallara F311	Mercedes HWA	23	(United Kingdom) Harry Tincknell	All
(United Kingdom) Fortec Motorsport	Dallara F311	Mercedes HWA	24	(Malaysia) Fahmi Ilyas	All
(United Kingdom) Double R Racing	Dallara F308	Mercedes HWA	5	(Brazil) Pipo Derani	All
(United Kingdom) Double R Racing	Dallara F308	Mercedes HWA	6	(Australia) Scott Pye	All
(United Kingdom) Double R Racing	Dallara F308	Mercedes HWA	26	(Finland) Valtteri Bottas	9
(United Kingdom) Double R Racing	Dallara F308	Mercedes HWA	26	(New Zealand) Mitch Evans	10
(United Kingdom) Hitech Racing	Dallara F308	Volkswagen	7	(Brazil) Pietro Fantin	All
(United Kingdom) Hitech Racing	Dallara F308	Volkswagen	27	(Spain) Bruno Méndez	1
(United Kingdom) Hitech Racing	Dallara F308	Volkswagen	27	(Brazil) Pedro Nunes	5
(United Kingdom) Hitech Racing	Dallara F308	Volkswagen	8	(Russia) Max Snegirev	9–10
(United Kingdom) Hitech Racing	Dallara F310	Volkswagen	8	(Russia) Max Snegirev	4
(United Kingdom) Hitech Racing	Dallara F310	Volkswagen	8	(United Kingdom) Riki Christodoulou	1–3
(United Kingdom) Hitech Racing	Dallara F310	Volkswagen	8	(Portugal) António Félix da Costa	5–6
(United Kingdom) Sino Vision Racing	Dallara F308	Mercedes HWA	11	(United Kingdom) Hywel Lloyd	All
(United Kingdom) Sino Vision Racing	Dallara F308	Mercedes HWA	12	(China) Adderly Fong	All
(United Kingdom) T-Sport	Dallara F311	Volkswagen	15	(Brazil) Yann Cunha	All
(United Kingdom) T-Sport	Dallara F311	Volkswagen	16	(Bahrain) Menasheh Idafar	All
(United Kingdom) T-Sport	Dallara F311	Volkswagen	17	(Netherlands) Bart Hylkema	6–10
(Germany) Motopark	Dallara F308	Volkswagen	18	(United Kingdom) Alexander Sims	10
Rookie Class
(United Kingdom) T-Sport	Dallara F307	Mugen-Honda	41	(Netherlands) Bart Hylkema	1–5
(United Kingdom) Hitech Racing	Dallara F307	Mugen-Honda	42	(Japan) Kotaro Sakurai	1
(United Kingdom) Hitech Racing	Dallara F305	Mugen-Honda	42	(Japan) Kotaro Sakurai	2–10
(United Kingdom) Team West-Tec	Dallara F307	Mugen-Honda	44	(Italy) Luca Orlandi	8
Invitation Entries
(United Kingdom) Double R Racing	Dallara F308	Mercedes HWA	77	(Estonia) Marko Asmer	7
(United Kingdom) Hitech Racing	Dallara F308	Volkswagen	77	(Brazil) Guilherme Silva	10
(Netherlands) Van Amersfoort Racing	Dallara F308	Volkswagen	92	(Netherlands) Hannes van Asseldonk	7
(France) Signature	Dallara F308	Volkswagen	93	(Germany) Daniel Abt	7
(France) Signature	Dallara F308	Volkswagen	94	(Colombia) Carlos Muñoz	7
(France) Signature	Dallara F308	Volkswagen	96	(Germany) Marco Wittmann	7
(France) Signature	Dallara F309	Volkswagen	95	(Belgium) Laurens Vanthoor	7
(Italy) Prema Powerteam	Dallara F308	Mercedes HWA	97	(Italy) Raffaele Marciello	7
(Italy) Prema Powerteam	Dallara F308	Mercedes HWA	98	(Spain) Roberto Merhi	7
(Italy) Prema Powerteam	Dallara F309	Mercedes HWA	99	(Spain) Daniel Juncadella	7

=== Driver changes ===
Changed Teams

- William Buller will change teams for his second season in British F3 moving from Hitech Racing to Fortec Motorsport. Lucas Foresti will also join Fortec Motorsport, having completed his rookie season with Carlin.
- After driving for Räikkönen Robertson Racing in 2010, Carlos Huertas and Felipe Nasr will join Carlin.
- After three seasons with his family-run CF Racing outfit, Hywel Lloyd will move to Sino Vision Racing to partner Adderly Fong.

Entering/Re-Entering British Formula 3 International Series

- After finishing runner-up to Robin Frijns in Formula BMW Europe, Jack Harvey moved to Carlin. Another Formula BMW Europe graduate, Fahmi Ilyas competed with Fortec Motorsport.
- Kevin Magnussen and Pipo Derani moved from the Motopark Academy team that competed in German F3 to compete in the championship. Magnussen drove for Carlin, while Derani raced for Double R Racing.
- Formula Three Sudamericana champion Yann Cunha moved into the series full-time and partnered National class champion Menasheh Idafar at T-Sport. Cunha competed at the second Silverstone meeting with CF Racing in 2010.
- After two seasons in Formula Renault UK, Harry Tincknell competed for Fortec Motorsport.
- Bart Hylkema moved into the series from the Formula Renault Eurocup, to compete in the secondary Rookie Cup for T-Sport. He was joined in the Rookie Cup by Kotaro Sakurai, who moved from the now-defunct Formula BMW Pacific series to compete for Hitech Racing.
- Pietro Fantin moved into the series from Formula Three Sudamericana. He will compete for Hitech Racing, the team he raced for in three meetings in 2010 when he was competing in the Invitation Class. He was joined by Formula Renault UK race-winner Riki Christodoulou, who returned to the championship after a season's absence, and Bruno Méndez, who competed in Formula Renault 3.5 in 2010.
- British Formula Ford champion Scott Pye moved into the championship, driving for Double R Racing.

Leaving British Formula Three

- After contesting a part season in Formula Renault 3.5 for Tech 1 Racing outside of commitments in British F3, 2010 champion Jean-Éric Vergne moved into the series full-time with Carlin. Third-placed Oliver Webb and ninth-placed Daniel McKenzie also moved into the series for Pons Racing and Comtec Racing respectively.
- Runner-up in 2010 James Calado moved into the GP3 Series with ART Grand Prix.
- Daisuke Nakajima returned to his native Japan to compete in Formula Nippon, having finished in eleventh place for Räikkönen Robertson Racing.
- Alex Brundle returned to FIA Formula Two Championship, having competed in the series' inaugural season in 2009. He was joined by Max Snegirev and National Class runner-up James Cole.

== Race calendar and results ==
- A provisional ten-round calendar was announced on 16 October 2010, before this was altered again on 26 November 2010. The Nürburgring meeting was moved from September to July on 4 February 2011. The first and third races at the Spa-Francorchamps round were also points-scoring for the FIA Formula 3 International Trophy.

Round		Circuit	Date	Pole position	Fastest lap	Winning driver	Winning team	Rookie Class winner	Supporting
1	R1	(Italy) Autodromo Nazionale Monza	16 April	(United Kingdom) William Buller	(Brazil) Felipe Nasr	(Brazil) Felipe Nasr	(United Kingdom) Carlin	No Winner	Blancpain Endurance Series
1	R2	(Italy) Autodromo Nazionale Monza	17 April		(United Kingdom) William Buller	(United Kingdom) Rupert Svendsen-Cook	(United Kingdom) Carlin	(Netherlands) Bart Hylkema	Blancpain Endurance Series
1	R3	(Italy) Autodromo Nazionale Monza	17 April	(United Kingdom) William Buller	(Brazil) Felipe Nasr	(Brazil) Felipe Nasr	(United Kingdom) Carlin	(Netherlands) Bart Hylkema	Blancpain Endurance Series
2	R1	(United Kingdom) Oulton Park	23 April	(Brazil) Lucas Foresti	(Brazil) Lucas Foresti	(Brazil) Lucas Foresti	(United Kingdom) Fortec Motorsport	(Netherlands) Bart Hylkema	British GT
2	R2	(United Kingdom) Oulton Park	25 April		(Brazil) Pietro Fantin	(United Kingdom) Riki Christodoulou	(United Kingdom) Hitech Racing	(Netherlands) Bart Hylkema	British GT
2	R3	(United Kingdom) Oulton Park	25 April	(Brazil) Felipe Nasr	(Brazil) Lucas Foresti	(Brazil) Felipe Nasr	(United Kingdom) Carlin	(Netherlands) Bart Hylkema	British GT
3	R1	(United Kingdom) Snetterton Motor Racing Circuit	14 May	(Brazil) Felipe Nasr	(Brazil) Felipe Nasr	(Denmark) Kevin Magnussen	(United Kingdom) Carlin	(Netherlands) Bart Hylkema	British GT
3	R2	(United Kingdom) Snetterton Motor Racing Circuit	15 May		(Denmark) Kevin Magnussen	(Brazil) Lucas Foresti	(United Kingdom) Fortec Motorsport	(Japan) Kotaro Sakurai	British GT
3	R3	(United Kingdom) Snetterton Motor Racing Circuit	15 May	(Brazil) Felipe Nasr	(Brazil) Felipe Nasr	(Denmark) Kevin Magnussen	(United Kingdom) Carlin	(Netherlands) Bart Hylkema	British GT
4	R1	(United Kingdom) Brands Hatch	18 June	(United Kingdom) Rupert Svendsen-Cook	(United Kingdom) William Buller	(Brazil) Lucas Foresti	(United Kingdom) Fortec Motorsport	(Japan) Kotaro Sakurai	British GT
4	R2	(United Kingdom) Brands Hatch	19 June		(United Kingdom) William Buller	(United Kingdom) Harry Tincknell	(United Kingdom) Fortec Motorsport	(Japan) Kotaro Sakurai	British GT
4	R3	(United Kingdom) Brands Hatch	19 June	(United Kingdom) Rupert Svendsen-Cook	(Denmark) Kevin Magnussen	(Brazil) Felipe Nasr	(United Kingdom) Carlin	(Netherlands) Bart Hylkema	British GT
5	R1	(Germany) Nürburgring	2 July	(Denmark) Kevin Magnussen	(Denmark) Kevin Magnussen	(Denmark) Kevin Magnussen	(United Kingdom) Carlin	(Netherlands) Bart Hylkema	FIA Formula Two; AvD 100 Meilen
5	R2	(Germany) Nürburgring	3 July		(United Kingdom) Jack Harvey	(United Kingdom) Jack Harvey	(United Kingdom) Carlin	(Netherlands) Bart Hylkema	FIA Formula Two; AvD 100 Meilen
5	R3	(Germany) Nürburgring	3 July	(Denmark) Kevin Magnussen	(Denmark) Kevin Magnussen	(Brazil) Felipe Nasr	(United Kingdom) Carlin	(Netherlands) Bart Hylkema	FIA Formula Two; AvD 100 Meilen
6	R1	(France) Circuit Paul Ricard, Le Castellet	16 July	(Denmark) Kevin Magnussen	(Brazil) Felipe Nasr	(Brazil) Felipe Nasr	(United Kingdom) Carlin	(Japan) Kotaro Sakurai	FIA GT1 World Championship
6	R2	(France) Circuit Paul Ricard, Le Castellet	17 July		(United Kingdom) William Buller	(United Kingdom) William Buller	(United Kingdom) Fortec Motorsport	(Japan) Kotaro Sakurai	FIA GT1 World Championship
6	R3	(France) Circuit Paul Ricard, Le Castellet	17 July	(Denmark) Kevin Magnussen	(Portugal) António Félix da Costa	(Brazil) Felipe Nasr	(United Kingdom) Carlin	(Japan) Kotaro Sakurai	FIA GT1 World Championship
7	R1	(Belgium) Circuit de Spa-Francorchamps	29 July	(Spain) Roberto Merhi	(Denmark) Kevin Magnussen^{1}	(Spain) Roberto Merhi	(Italy) Prema Powerteam	(Japan) Kotaro Sakurai	24 Hours of Spa
7	R2	(Belgium) Circuit de Spa-Francorchamps	29 July		(United Kingdom) Rupert Svendsen-Cook^{2}	(Denmark) Kevin Magnussen	(United Kingdom) Carlin	(Japan) Kotaro Sakurai	24 Hours of Spa
7	R3	(Belgium) Circuit de Spa-Francorchamps	30 July	(Spain) Roberto Merhi	(Brazil) Felipe Nasr^{1}	(Spain) Roberto Merhi	(Italy) Prema Powerteam	(Japan) Kotaro Sakurai	24 Hours of Spa
8	R1	(United Kingdom) Rockingham Motor Speedway	3 September	(Brazil) Pietro Fantin	(Brazil) Felipe Nasr	(Brazil) Pietro Fantin	(United Kingdom) Hitech Racing	(Italy) Luca Orlandi	British GT
8	R2	(United Kingdom) Rockingham Motor Speedway	4 September		(Brazil) Felipe Nasr	(Australia) Scott Pye	(United Kingdom) Double R Racing	(Japan) Kotaro Sakurai	British GT
8	R3	(United Kingdom) Rockingham Motor Speedway	4 September	(Brazil) Pietro Fantin	(Brazil) Pietro Fantin	(Denmark) Kevin Magnussen	(United Kingdom) Carlin	(Japan) Kotaro Sakurai	British GT
9	R1	(United Kingdom) Donington Park	24 September	(United Kingdom) Rupert Svendsen-Cook	(Denmark) Kevin Magnussen	(United Kingdom) Rupert Svendsen-Cook	(United Kingdom) Carlin	(Japan) Kotaro Sakurai	British GT
9	R2	(United Kingdom) Donington Park	25 September		(Brazil) Felipe Nasr	(Finland) Valtteri Bottas	(United Kingdom) Double R Racing	No Winner	British GT
9	R3	(United Kingdom) Donington Park	25 September	(Brazil) Felipe Nasr	(Finland) Valtteri Bottas	(Denmark) Kevin Magnussen	(United Kingdom) Carlin	No Winner	British GT
10	R1	(United Kingdom) Silverstone Circuit	8 October	(Denmark) Kevin Magnussen	(Denmark) Kevin Magnussen	(Denmark) Kevin Magnussen	(United Kingdom) Carlin	(Japan) Kotaro Sakurai	British GT
10	R2	(United Kingdom) Silverstone Circuit	9 October		(Denmark) Kevin Magnussen	(United Kingdom) Alexander Sims	(Germany) Motopark	(Japan) Kotaro Sakurai	British GT
10	R3	(United Kingdom) Silverstone Circuit	9 October	(Denmark) Kevin Magnussen	(Denmark) Kevin Magnussen	(Colombia) Carlos Huertas	(United Kingdom) Carlin	(Japan) Kotaro Sakurai	British GT

- ^{1} Fastest lap recorded by Roberto Merhi, but he was ineligible to score the fastest lap point.
- ^{2} Fastest lap recorded by Hannes van Asseldonk, but he was ineligible to score the fastest lap point.

== Championship standings ==
Pos	Driver	MNZ (Italy)			OUL (United Kingdom)			SNE (United Kingdom)			BRH (United Kingdom)			NÜR (Germany)			LEC (France)			SPA (Belgium)			ROC (United Kingdom)			DON (United Kingdom)			SIL (United Kingdom)			Pts
Championship Class
1	(Brazil) Felipe Nasr	1	2	1	2	5	1	2	6	17	2	6	1	2	4	1	1	16	1	9	8	7	6	2	3	Ret	10	9	3	7	Ret	318
2	(Denmark) Kevin Magnussen	15	8	6	8	18	Ret	1	8	1	8	11	15	1	6	5	4	4	Ret	7	1	8	7	5	1	Ret	16	1	1	8	2	237
3	(Colombia) Carlos Huertas	3	6	4	4	6	10	3	10	2	5	3	5	Ret	Ret	3	3	5	5	10	11	9	5	6	11	2	6	4	7	9	1	222
4	(United Kingdom) William Buller	4	3	7	14	13	5	9	3	Ret	6	15	3	5	Ret	7	7	1	2	2	10	3	15	3	4	8	2	16	6	12	5	197
5	(United Kingdom) Rupert Svendsen-Cook	5	1	8	10	8	4	4	Ret	13	3	7	Ret	8	2	6	6	2	4	6	2	14	2	10	Ret	1	8	3	Ret	15	3	191
6	(Malaysia) Jazeman Jaafar	2	5	3	3	4	6	16	16	4	4	5	4	4	5	11	8	9	Ret	3	DSQ	12	4	4	5	5	4	10	4	19	9	187
7	(Brazil) Lucas Foresti	9	17	2	1	7	2	10	1	9	1	8	2	9	11	4	9	7	Ret	13	13	11	11	12	12	17	7	8	5	2	6	170
8	(Brazil) Pietro Fantin	Ret	9	5	5	2	9	6	4	5	12	9	10	11	Ret	8	15	8	Ret	19	14	DSQ	1	19	2	12	14	6	9	3	8	119
9	(United Kingdom) Jack Harvey	Ret	10	17	11	10	19	15	Ret	12	13	12	6	7	1	14	5	6	3	5	12	10	3	14	6	3	9	Ret	10	6	18	112
10	(Australia) Scott Pye	Ret	12	14	9	9	8	Ret	11	7	7	4	8	12	10	12	14	Ret	Ret	16	16	15	8	1	7	4	Ret	5	2	20	17	81
11	(United Kingdom) Harry Tincknell	11	11	16	6	3	7	8	2	8	10	1	9	3	8	9	10	17	Ret	22	Ret	16	Ret	13	8	7	5	14	12	16	11	78
12	(United Kingdom) Riki Christodoulou	6	4	11	7	1	12	5	7	3																						51
13	(Portugal) António Félix da Costa													6	7	2	2	3	9													51
14	(Bahrain) Menasheh Idafar	8	18	10	Ret	Ret	3	14	17	19	9	2	Ret	19	Ret	Ret	Ret	11	12	Ret	Ret	19	9	7	Ret	11	3	11	19	4	13	48
15	(Brazil) Pipo Derani	Ret	Ret	9	Ret	14	13	13	12	6	15	13	Ret	14	9	13	13	Ret	10	18	21	Ret	13	8	Ret	10	Ret	2	14	5	12	36
16	(United Kingdom) Hywel Lloyd	7	7	15	12	11	14	7	5	14	Ret	Ret	7	16	13	19	12	10	7	15	18	Ret	10	9	Ret	15	13	12	11	Ret	10	34
17	(Finland) Valtteri Bottas																									6	1	13				17
18	(United Kingdom) Alexander Sims																												8	1	7	17
19	(Brazil) Pedro Nunes													10	3	10																10
20	(New Zealand) Mitch Evans																												Ret	11	4	10
21	(Malaysia) Fahmi Ilyas	12	Ret	12	15	15	15	Ret	13	15	Ret	Ret	DNS	13	Ret	20	11	14	6	20	Ret	18	Ret	15	10	18	17	Ret	20	Ret	19	7
22	(China) Adderly Fong	13	16	20	16	16	11	12	14	11	11	10	Ret	15	12	15	17	12	Ret	21	20	22	14	11	Ret	16	12	7	18	17	16	5
23	(Netherlands) Bart Hylkema																Ret	Ret	8	Ret	22	17	12	17	9	14	Ret	17	13	Ret	14	5
24	(Russia) Max Snegirev										16	Ret	12													9	15	Ret	16	13	Ret	2
25	(Spain) Bruno Méndez	10	14	18																												1
26	(Brazil) Yann Cunha	14	13	13	13	12	16	11	9	10	14	14	11	18	14	16	16	13	Ret	23	19	20	Ret	16	Ret	13	11	15	15	10	15	−36
Guest drivers ineligible for points
	(Spain) Roberto Merhi																			1	15	1										0
	(Germany) Marco Wittmann																			11	5	2										0
	(Spain) Daniel Juncadella																			8	3	Ret										0
	(Colombia) Carlos Muñoz																			4	6	Ret										0
	(Belgium) Laurens Vanthoor																			17	7	4										0
	(Netherlands) Hannes van Asseldonk																			12	4	Ret										0
	(Italy) Raffaele Marciello																			Ret	17	5										0
	(Estonia) Marko Asmer																			Ret	Ret	6										0
	(Germany) Daniel Abt																			14	9	13										0
	(Brazil) Guilherme Silva																												17	14	Ret	0
Rookie Class
1	(Japan) Kotaro Sakurai	Ret	DNS	DNS	18	Ret	18	18	15	18	17	16	14	20	16	18	18	15	11	24	23	21	Ret	18	13	19	Ret	Ret	21	18	20	378
2	(Netherlands) Bart Hylkema	NC	15	19	17	17	17	17	Ret	16	Ret	17	13	17	15	17																214
3	(Italy) Luca Orlandi																						16	20	14							45
Pos	Driver	MNZ (Italy)			OUL (United Kingdom)			SNE (United Kingdom)			BRH (United Kingdom)			NÜR (Germany)			LEC (France)			SPA (Belgium)			ROC (United Kingdom)			DON (United Kingdom)			SIL (United Kingdom)			Pts
