= Felipe Nasr =

Brazilian racing driver (born 1992)

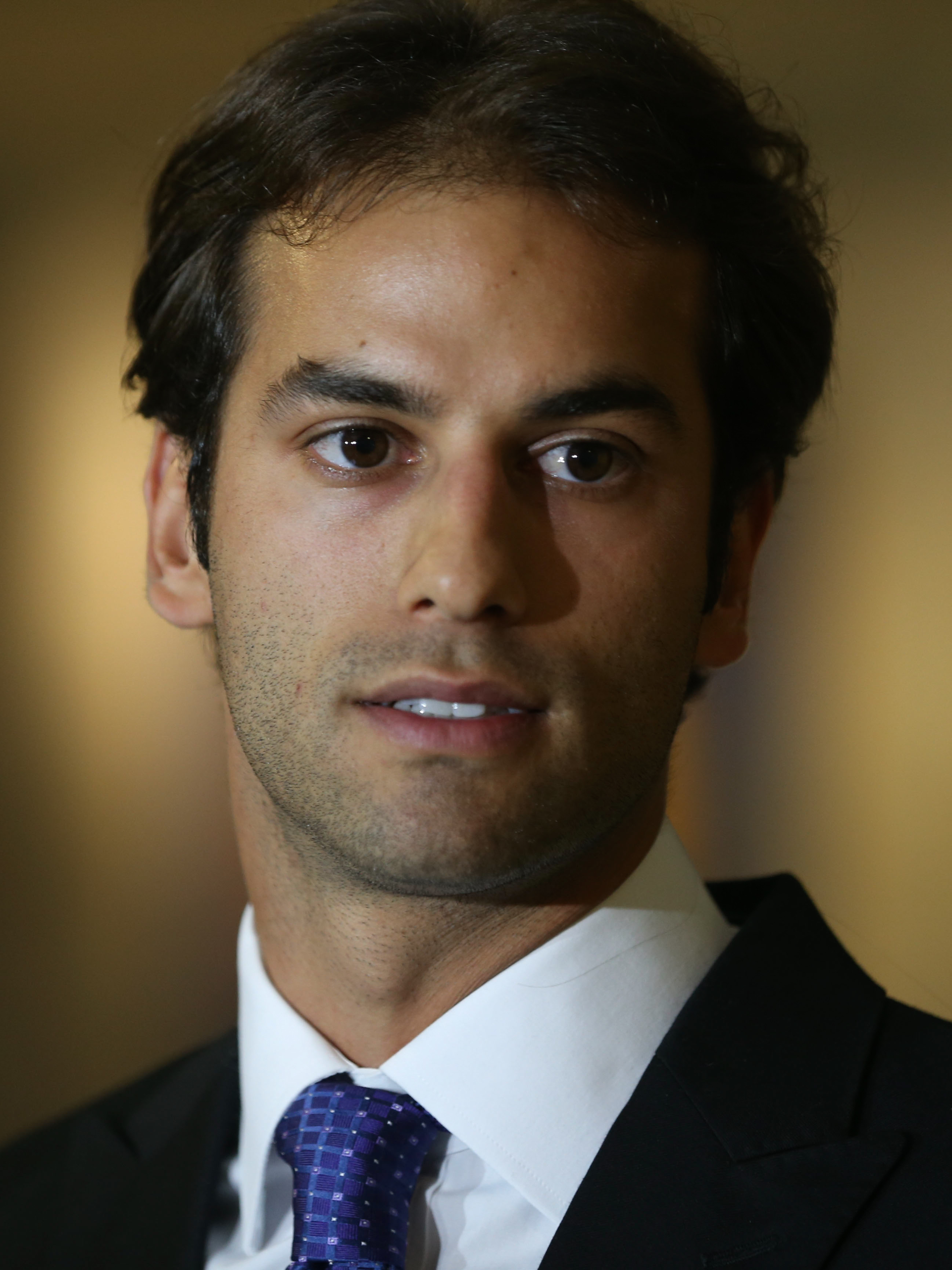
- Nasr in 2016
- Born: Luiz Felipe de Oliveira Nasr; 21 August 1992 (age 34); Brasília, Federal District, Brazil
- Relatives: Amir Nasr (uncle)

IMSA SportsCar Championship career
- Debut season: 2018
- Current team: Porsche Penske Motorsport
- Categorisation: FIA Platinum
- Car number: 7
- Former teams: AXR, Pfaff
- Starts: 77
- Championships: 3 (2018, 2021, 2024)
- Wins: 16
- Podiums: 40
- Poles: 8
- Fastest laps: 15
- Best finish: 1st in 2018 (P), 2021 (DPi), 2024 (GTP)

Formula One World Championship career
- Nationality: (Brazil) Brazilian
- Active years: 2015–2016
- Team: Sauber
- Car number: 12
- Entries: 40 (39 starts)
- Championships: 0
- Wins: 0
- Podiums: 0
- Career points: 29
- Pole positions: 0
- Fastest laps: 0
- First entry: 2015 Australian Grand Prix
- Last entry: 2016 Abu Dhabi Grand Prix

24 Hours of Le Mans career
- Years: 2018, 2021–2024
- Teams: Cetilar, Risi, Penske, Porsche
- Best finish: 9th (2022)
- Class wins: 0

Previous series
- 2012–2014 2010–2011 2009 2009 2008: GP2 Series; British F3; Formula BMW Europe; Formula BMW Pacific; Formula BMW Americas

Championship titles
- 2018–2019, 2024 2018–19, 2024–26 2011 2009: IMSA SportsCar Championship; Michelin Endurance Cup British F3; Formula BMW Europe

Awards
- 2012: Sunoco Rolex 24 at Daytona Challenge

Luiz Felipe de Oliveira Nasr (born 21 August 1992) is a Brazilian racing driver, who competes in the IMSA SportsCar Championship for Team Penske Porsche. Nasr competed in Formula One from 2015 to 2016. In endurance racing, Nasr has won three IMSA SportsCar Championship titles. His notable wins include the 12 Hours of Sebring in 2019, 2025 and 2026 and the 24 Hours of Daytona in 2022 and in three-straight years in the GTP from 2024—2026.

After a year as the official test driver for Williams in 2014, Nasr joined Sauber as a full-time Formula One driver in 2015. However, from the 2017 season, he was replaced by Pascal Wehrlein.

From 2018, Nasr has been competing in the IMSA WeatherTech SportsCar Championship for Whelen Engineering Racing, winning the championship with co-driver Eric Curran in his first year in the series and winning another title with countryman Pipo Derani in 2021. For 2022, Nasr was named a Porsche factory driver. Since 2023, he has competed in IMSA for Team Penske.

== Early career ==
=== Karting ===
Born in Brasília, Distrito Federal, Nasr began karting in Brazil when he was seven years old. Between 2000 and 2007, he won several championship titles in Brazil.

=== Formula BMW ===
2008

Nasr made his open-wheel racing debut in the final round of the 2008 Formula BMW Americas season at Interlagos, which supported the 2008 Brazilian Grand Prix, claiming a podium finish in the second race in a championship that was dominated by Alexander Rossi.

2009

Nasr moved to the European championship of Formula BMW in 2009 for EuroInternational. He finished fourteen of the sixteen races in the top two, won six races, five pole-positions and claimed the title by 104 points from teammate Daniel Juncadella. As the championship was held by BMW, linked to Sauber in that season, Nasr was called to test a Sauber F1 car, but with BMW leaving F1, the test did not happen.

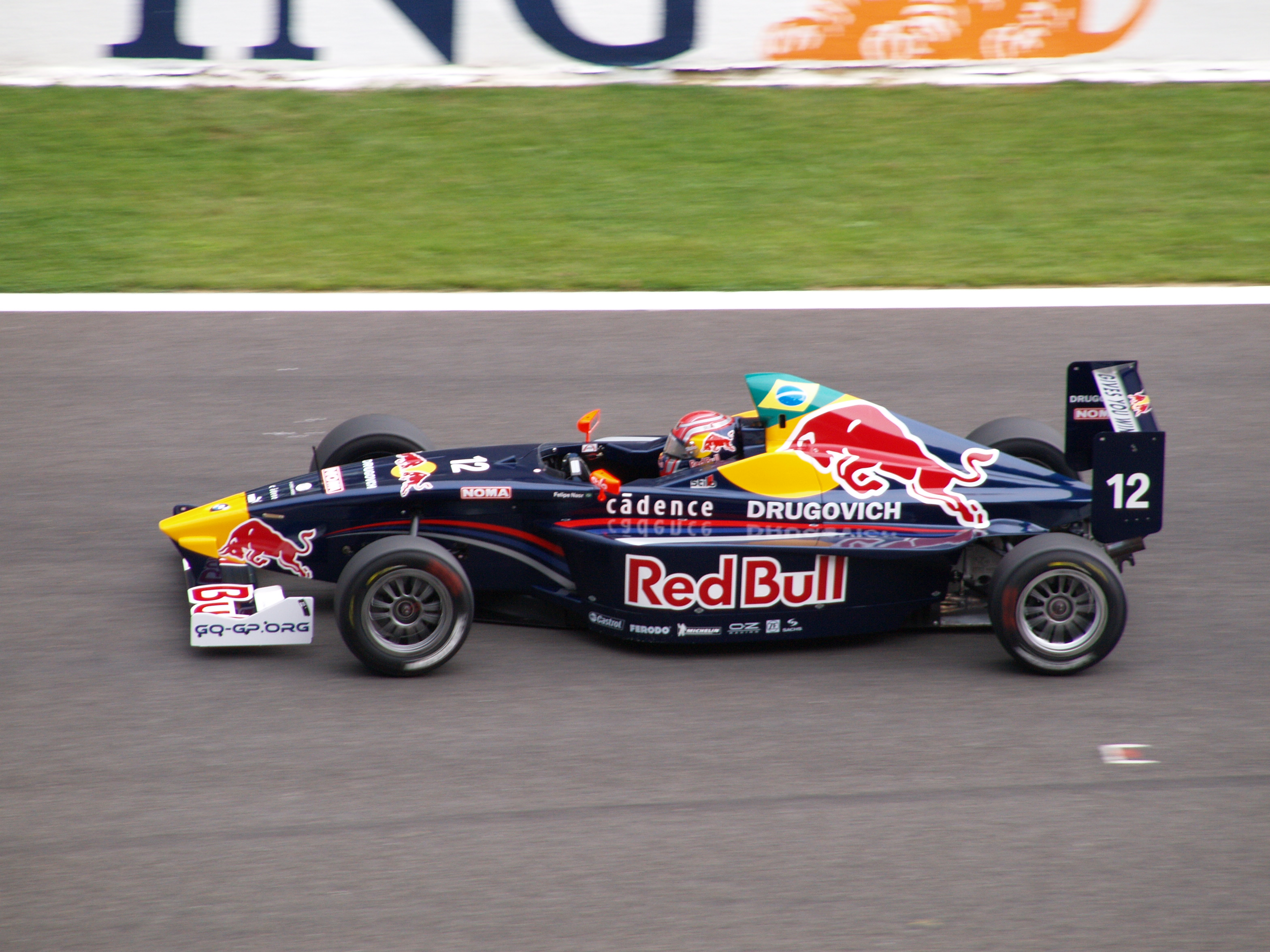
Felipe Nasr driving at Spa-Francorchamps for EuroInternational

=== Formula Three ===
2010

For the 2010 season, Nasr moved into the British Formula 3 Championship with Räikkönen Robertson Racing, joining a three-car team alongside the team's 2009 drivers Carlos Huertas and Daisuke Nakajima. In addition to signing for the team, Nasr signed to Robertson Management, the organisation that manages the career of former Formula One World Drivers' Champion Kimi Räikkönen. Nasr finished the 2010 British Formula 3 season in fifth position.

2011

Nasr signed with Carlin Motorsport for the 2011 Championship and won the Sunoco Rolex 24 at Daytona Challenge, a special joint racing programme among series in the United Kingdom that use Sunoco Racing Fuel. The winner of that challenge won a drive in the 2012 Rolex 24 at Daytona. He was third in the Daytona 24 Hour. Nasr claimed the title of the 2011 British Formula 3 season, 123 points ahead of his teammate, Kevin Magnussen.

In the 2012 Rolex 24 at Daytona, Nasr finished third overall and in class, driving a second generation Riley prototype for Michael Shank Racing.

=== GP2 Series ===
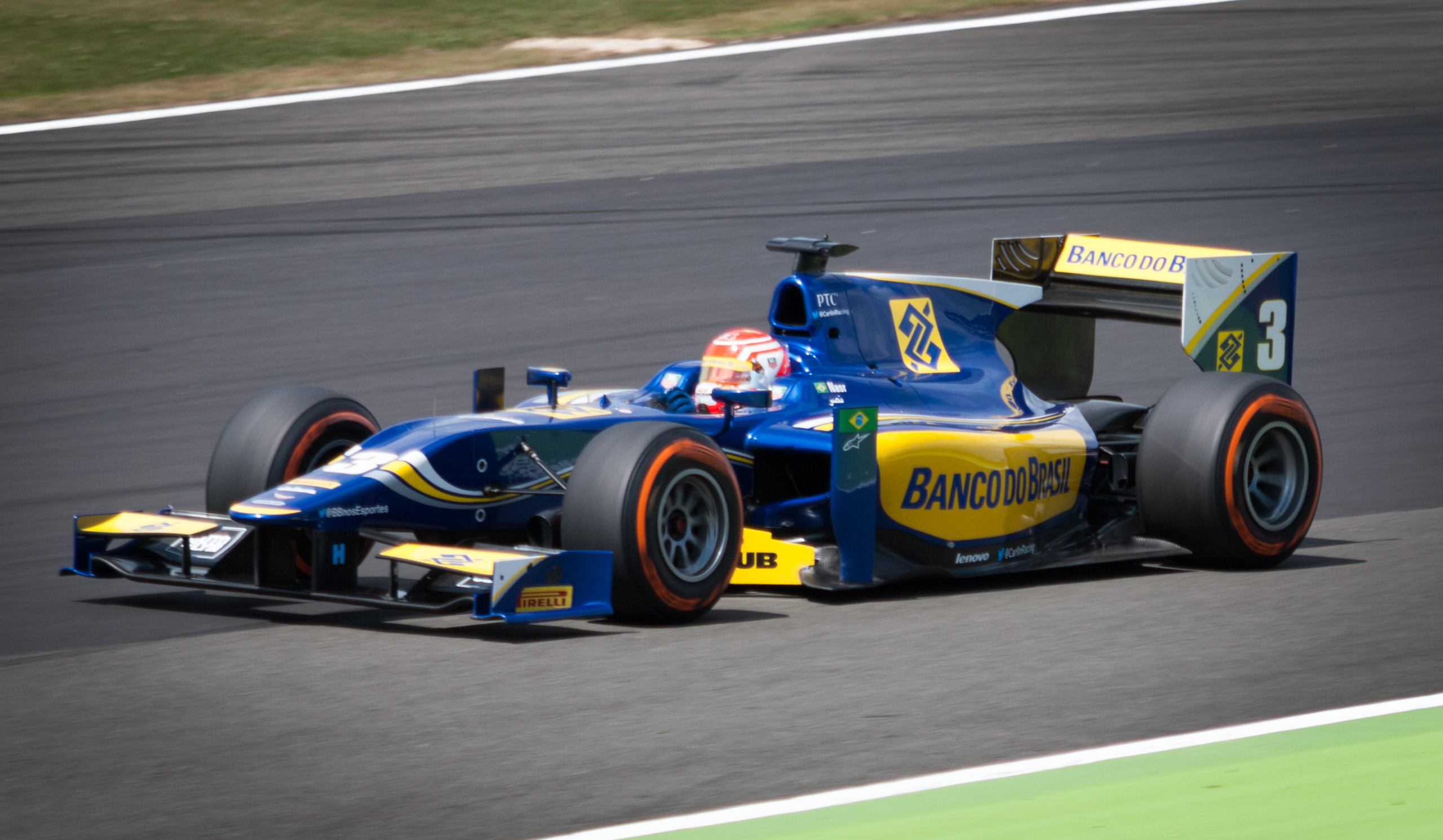
Nasr competing for Carlin, during the 2014 GP2 Series season, at Silverstone. Nasr won the sprint race at Silverstone – his third of four victories in 2014 – en route to third in the championship.

2012

Nasr signed with DAMS to race in the 2012 GP2 Series season with the support of Brazilian sponsors Banco do Brasil and Eike Batista's OGX. Nasr's best results were a second place in Race 2 of the Belgian round and a fourth place in Race 1 of the German round. He was teamed with the experienced Davide Valsecchi, who won the drivers' championship; Nasr's tenth place in the standings meant DAMS won the teams' championship as well. He took four podium finishes, with a best finish of second at Spa, and was the second highest-placed rookie overall, behind James Calado.

2013

For the 2013 GP2 Series season Nasr moved to Carlin, partnering British Jolyon Palmer. Nasr believed that he would be a title contender, alongside James Calado and Marcus Ericsson, and hoped to be driving an F1 car at the end of the year. Nasr finished the 2013 campaign fourth overall in the standings.

2014

Nasr remained with Carlin for the 2014 season, partnering Colombian Julián Leal. He took his first GP2 win in the sprint race in Barcelona. He achieved wins at the Red Bull Ring, Silverstone, and Spa-Francorchamps. Throughout the season, he was involved in a fight for the championship with former teammate Jolyon Palmer, losing out in Russia. Nasr finished third overall, after losing second place by five points, to rookie Stoffel Vandoorne at Yas Marina.

== Professional single-seater career ==
=== Formula One ===
2014

It was confirmed on 22 February 2014 that Nasr would be joining Williams as the team's reserve driver, participating in three tests and five free practice sessions across the course of the season. He made his first appearance in first practice in the Bahrain Grand Prix replacing Valtteri Bottas.

==== Sauber (2015–2016) ====
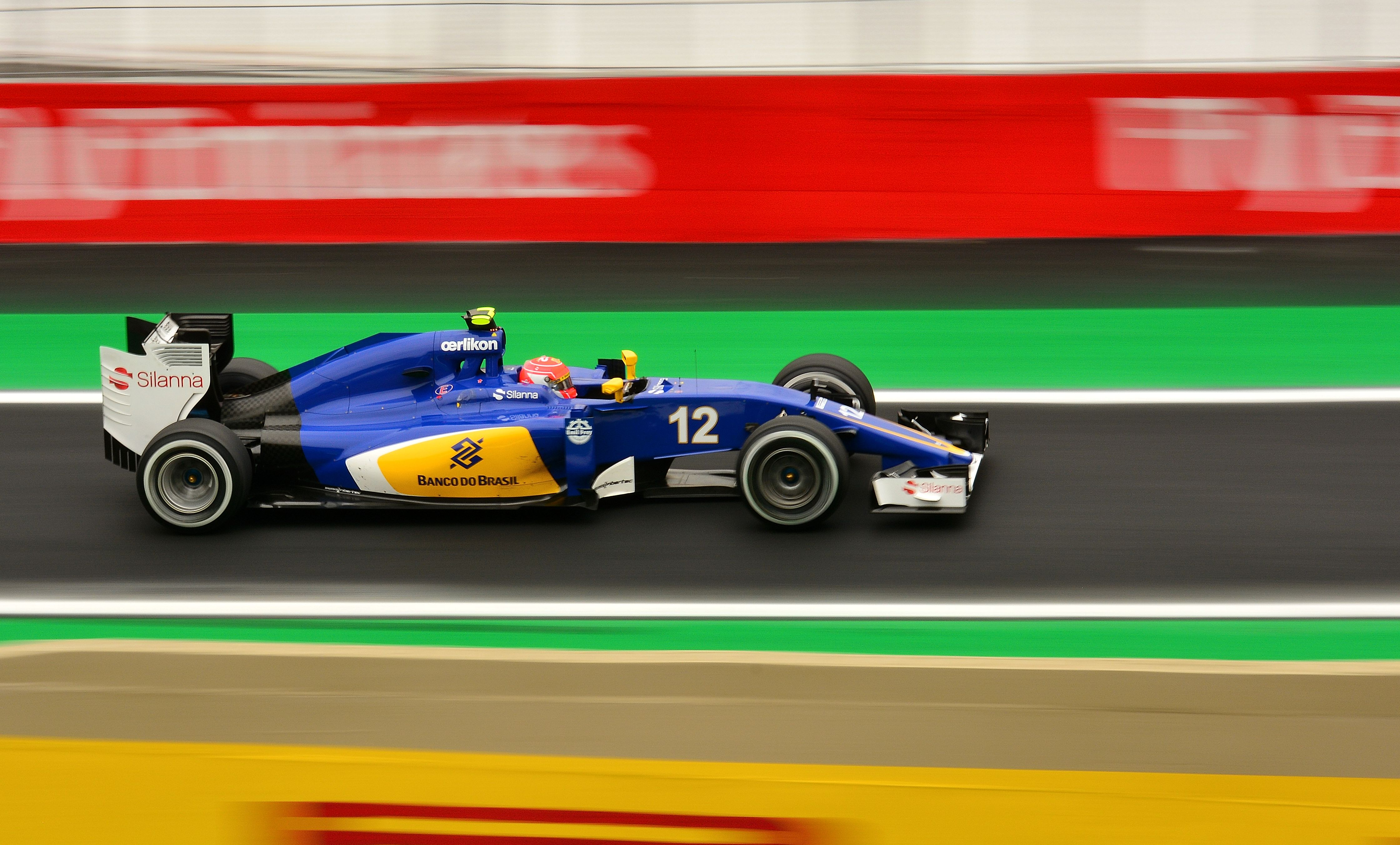
Nasr driving for Sauber at the 2015 Brazilian Grand Prix

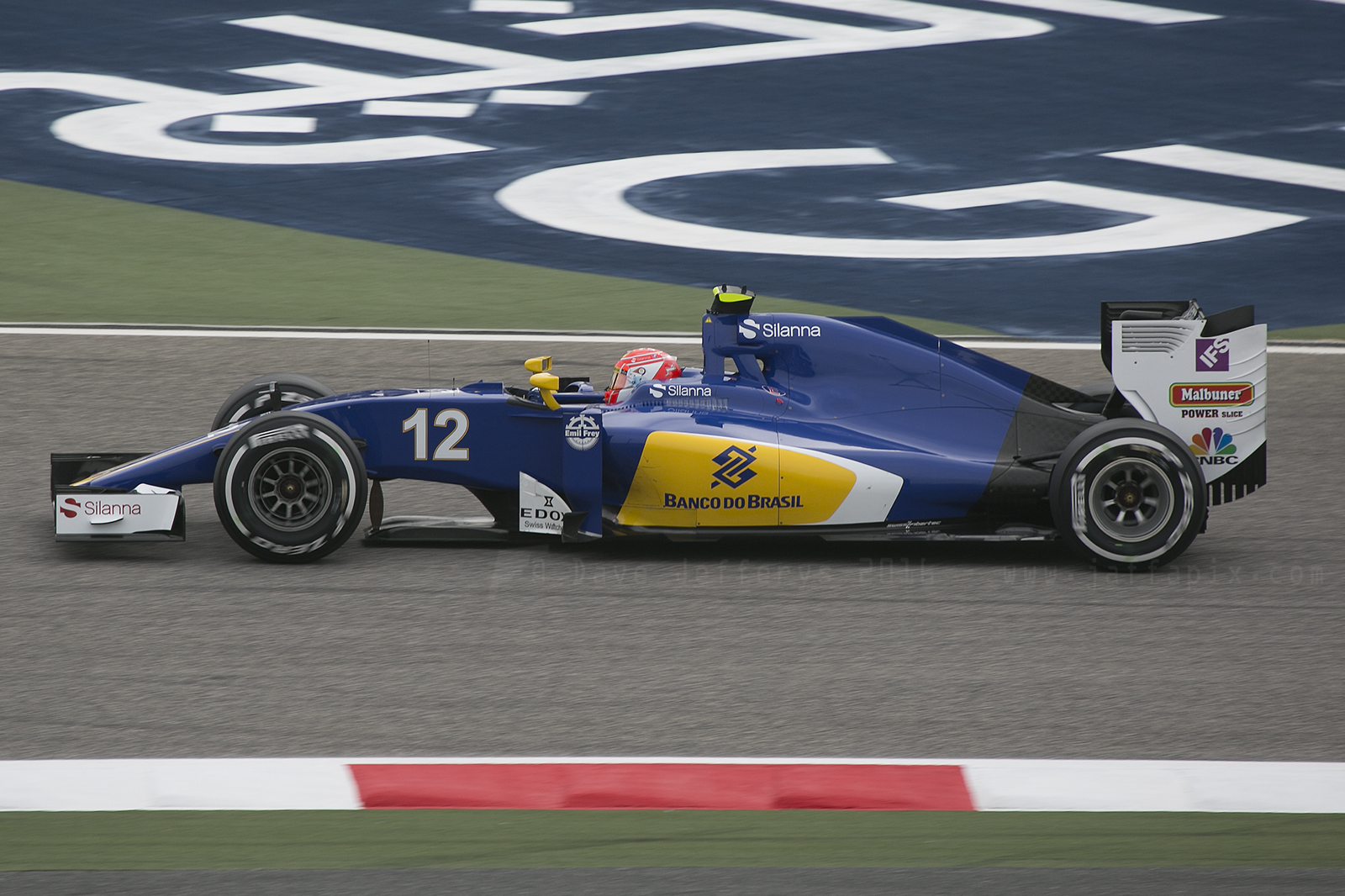
Nasr driving for Sauber at the 2016 Bahrain Grand Prix

On 5 November 2014, it was announced that Nasr would drive for Sauber in 2015. In his first race with the team in Australia, Nasr finished in fifth position, the highest placing for a Brazilian driver making a Grand Prix début. His finishing streak ended at the British Grand Prix, when his gearbox failed on the way to the grid. In Japan, for the first time, he failed to finish, as he had a mechanical failure on lap 51; he was classified in 20th place. Nasr finished his début season with 27 points, finishing 13th in the drivers' championship. After a successful 2015 season, Sauber retained Nasr for 2016.

Nasr's—and Sauber's—only points in 2016 came at the Brazilian Grand Prix, where he finished ninth. The finish allowed Sauber to overtake Manor in the constructors' championship, which cost the latter team prize money and eventually led to Manor's bankruptcy. Ironically, this meant Nasr was left without a seat for the 2017 season as he was due to swap places with Manor driver Pascal Wehrlein and could not find another seat after the Manor team exited the sport.

=== Formula E ===
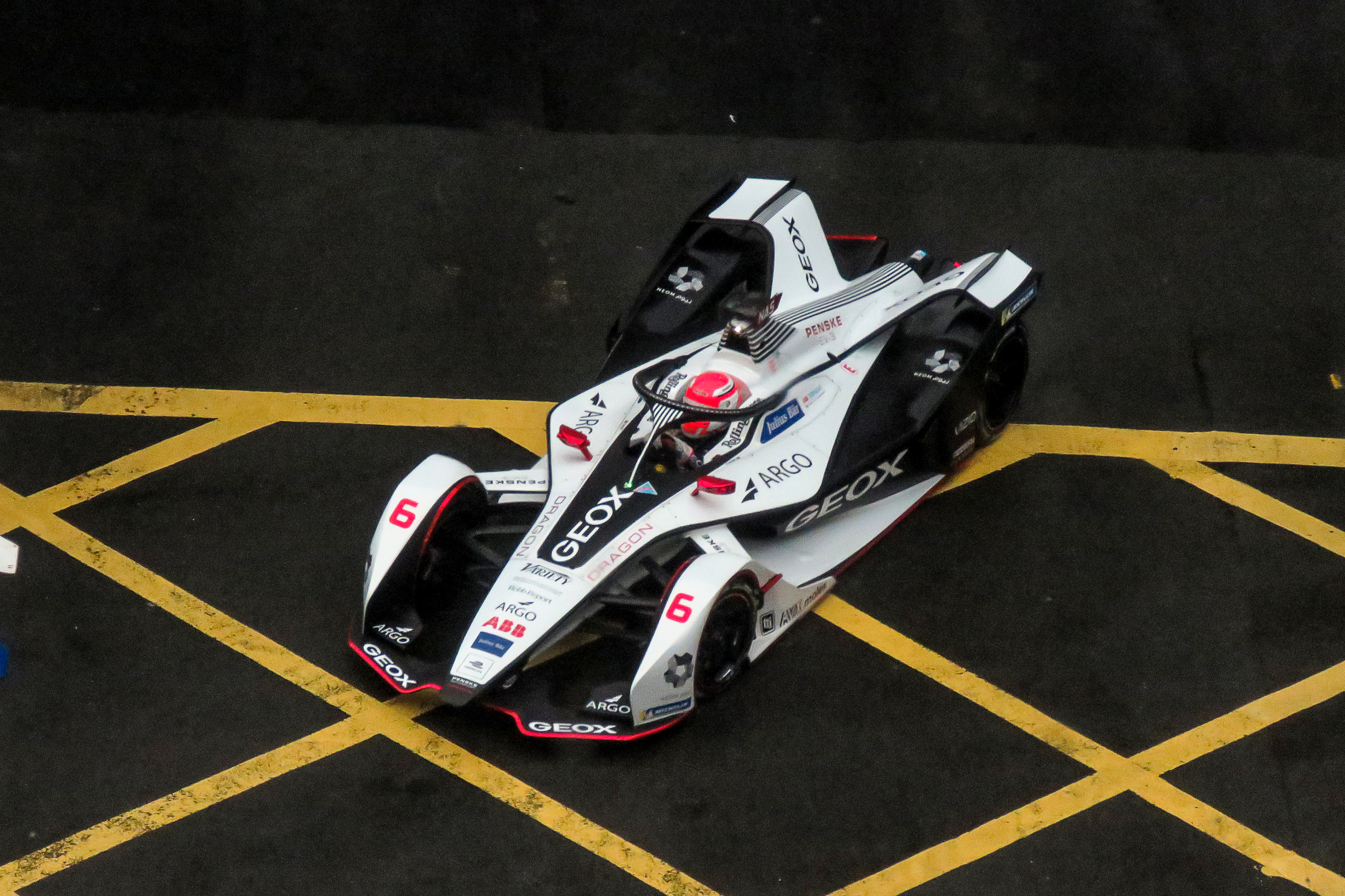
Nasr at the 2019 Hong Kong ePrix

In January 2019, Nasr joined GEOX Dragon for the rookie test in Marrakesh, but was unable to participate due to contractual issues. The following month, it was announced Nasr would replace Maximilian Günther from the Mexico City ePrix onwards. Because of Nasr's IMSA commitments, Günther had temporarily returned to his seat at the 2019 Rome ePrix. He made his debut at the 2019 Mexico City ePrix where he finished in 19th place, having run at the back of the pack for the majority of the race. At his second race in Hong Kong, he crashed his car into the wall early in the race, taking out the two Mahindra cars of Pascal Wehrlein & Jerome d'Ambrosio in the process. At his third race in Sanya, he stalled on the grid & recorded his second successive DNF. Nasr has not returned to Formula E since, ending his run at three consecutive races with one non-points finish and two DNFs, as the team opted to continue using Günther moving forward. He was classified 24th overall in the championship, tied on no points with Tom Dillmann & Felix Rosenqvist.

=== Planned IndyCar debut ===
On 10 March 2020, it was announced Nasr was scheduled to make his IndyCar debut for Carlin at the Firestone Grand Prix of St. Petersburg. However, due to the COVID-19 pandemic, the race was postponed until October, putting his debut on hold. Ultimately, Nasr did not compete in the 2020 season.

== Sportscar career ==
=== Cadillac factory driver (2018–21) ===
==== 2018 ====
After a year without racing competitively, Nasr entered the Prototype category of the 2018 IMSA SportsCar Championship, partnering Eric Curran at Whelen Engineering Racing in a Cadillac DPi-V.R. The duo started well, finishing second at the 24 Hours of Daytona and taking third in the 12 Hours of Sebring, despite Nasr being involved in an on-track incident in both races respectively. During round five at Belle Isle, Nasr held off a fresh-tyred Ricky Taylor to claim his maiden IMSA win, thus putting himself and Curran to the top of the standings. Nasr and Curran remained consistent throughout the rest of the season, scoring two more podiums, and clinched both the North American Endurance Cup and overall titles at the final round in Road Atlanta.

==== 2019 ====
Nasr remained at the team for 2019, this time partnering compatriot Pipo Derani for the full season and being joined by Curran for the endurance events. He finished second after being overtaken by eventual winner Fernando Alonso at Daytona, before triumphing at Sebring. The next six races only saw one podium finish at Belle Isle, whilst the Acura Team Penske No. 6 gained the upper hand in the title battle. At the second-to-last race in Laguna Seca, the No. 6 won, leaving third-placed Nasr and Derani twelve points behind going into the season finale. Victory at Petit Le Mans earned Nasr and Derani the Endurance Cup title, though they lost out on the overall crown by merely five points.

==== 2020 ====
For his third successive season at Action Express Racing, Nasr was once again joined by Derani. The 2020 season was interrupted by the COVID-19 pandemic, and come the second round of the campaign Nasr would be forced to sit out after testing positive for the disease. He returned to race at the next race in Sebring, where Derani qualified on pole before he and Nasr claimed victory. Four further podiums in the next five races followed, as Nasr helped AXR to fourth in the teams' standings.

==== 2021 ====
Going into 2021, the Nasr-Derani combination won the Daytona quali race, for which Nasr had qualified in first place. Race results did not come instantly, however, as the pair finished sixth in Daytona and retired in the same spot at Sebring after Nasr collected the No. 5 Cadillac at turn 1 during the fifth hour. A successful defense from Ricky Taylor left Nasr second at Mid-Ohio, before the Brazilian once again finished second in Detroit. At the second race at Watkins Glen, Nasr was able to jump into the lead with a quicker pit stop and held off Renger van der Zande for his first win of the season, despite having to save fuel in the final stint. Fuel strategy proved decisive during the next round in Road America (for which Nasr took pole), as a late pit stop by Dane Cameron allowed Derani to inherit the lead and victory number two. Third at Laguna Seca was followed by a dominant performance at Long Beach: Nasr scored pole before setting the building blocks to finishing ten seconds ahead of the runners-up. Nasr took pole for the season finale, putting himself and Derani within striking distance of catching the pair of WTR's Ricky Taylor and Filipe Albuquerque. The AXR No. 31 was a frontrunner throughout the entire race, and Nasr was leading until being passed with 22 minutes remaining. He then battled for second with Taylor before colliding at turn 10, the Acura going off and being forced to return the position to the Cadillac. Nasr crossed the line in second to claim his second IMSA title, his first alongside Derani.

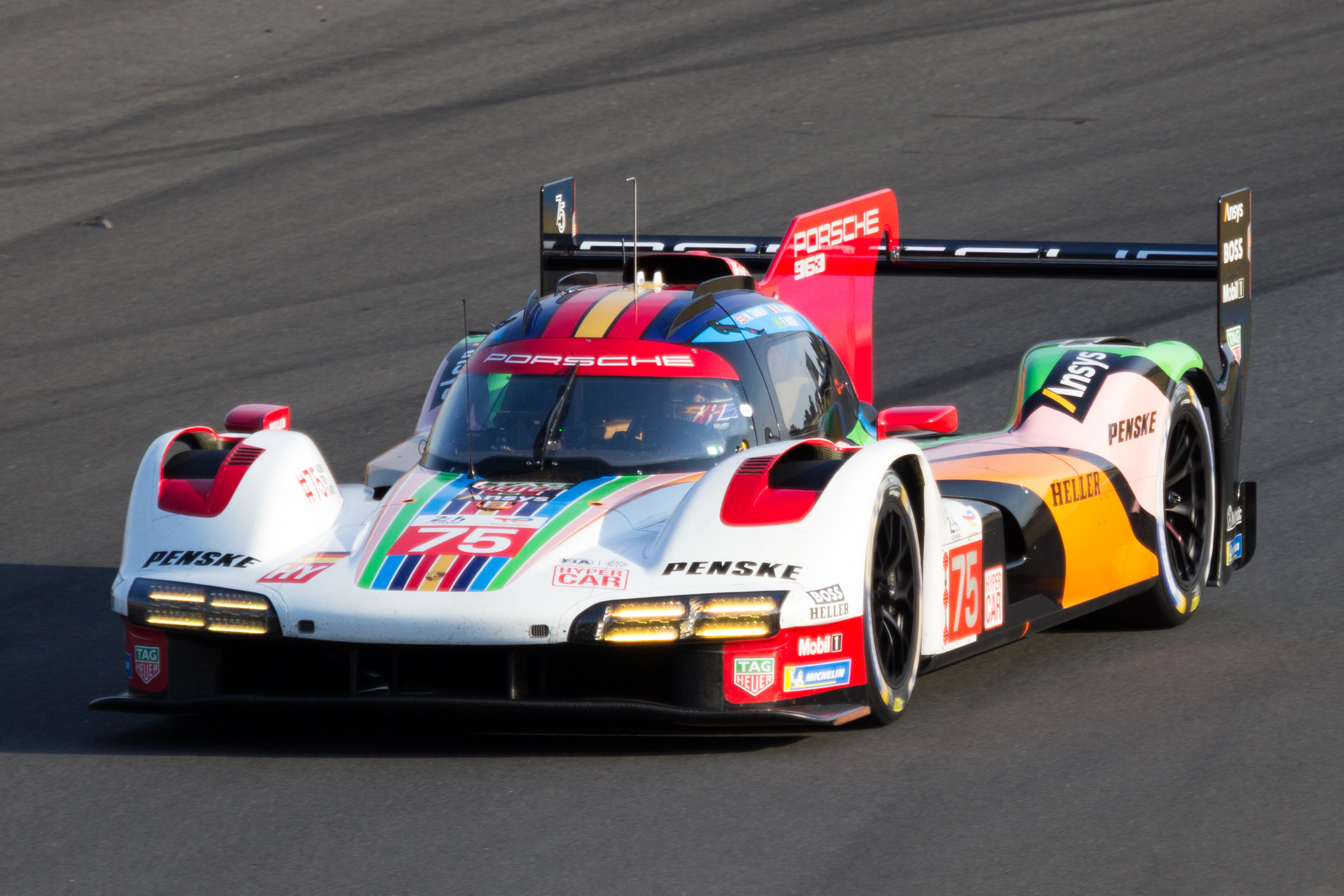
Nasr competing at the 2023 24 Hours of Le Mans. His first as a Porsche factory driver.

=== Porsche Penske factory driver (2022–present) ===
==== 2022 ====
In December 2021, Nasr and Dane Cameron were the first drivers to be announced for the new Porsche Penske Motorsport project in the emerging LMDh category. In preparation for the introduction of the Porsche 963 in 2023, Penske entered the LMP2 class of the 2022 FIA World Endurance Championship with an Oreca 07, driven by Nasr, Cameron, and Emmanuel Collard. The trio finished Sebring eighth and took fourth at Spa-Francorchamps. At the 24 Hours of Le Mans, the early efforts of Nasr and Cameron brought the No. 5 Penske up to second, before a delaminating left front tyre caused the team to lose ground in hour six. In the end, Nasr and his teammates finished fifth in class. As Penske's focus shifted towards preparations for the LMDh programme, the LMP2 campaign was discontinued following the Le Mans weekend. During the same year, Nasr contested the three crown jewel events of the IMSA schedule in the GTD Pro class with Pfaff Motorsports: he, along with Mathieu Jaminet and Matt Campbell claimed a dramatic class win at Daytona, finished fifth at Sebring, and took third at Petit Le Mans The latter result earned Jaminet and Campbell the GTD Pro title.

==== 2023 ====
For the 2023 season, Nasr partnered Campbell in the new 963 as part of Porsche Penske's #7 crew in the IMSA SCC. In a challenging debut season for the car, Nasr and Campbell scored three podiums, including a controlling victory at Road America. They finished fifth in the drivers' standings, level on points with the sister car which finished ahead on countback.

==== 2024 ====
Nasr was joined by Cameron for the 2024 IMSA season, with Campbell providing support in the endurance events. Daytona became a crowning achievement for Nasr, who took victory after defending his position hard against a chasing Tom Blomqvist in the final hour. A slew of third places followed, starting at Sebring and carrying over through Long Beach and Laguna Seca, despite suffering contacts from GT cars in the latter two. Fourth at Detroit came next before a pass on Louis Delétraz at the final restart in Watkins Glen earned Nasr his second win of the year. Second at Road America extended Nasr and Cameron's championship lead to 100 points, though a ninth place on the road at Indianapolis after Nasr nursed the car home with a power steering failure looked to undo their advantage. However, two disqualifications, including one for the podium-finishing No. 6 Porsche, increased the No. 7's gap to 124 points. With a third place at Petit Le Mans, Nasr and Cameron took home both the overall IMSA title and the Michelin Endurance Cup. Nasr's experiences at Le Mans were registered by filmmakers Abdala Brothers in a documentary film, 2DIE4, released in 2026.

==== 2025 ====
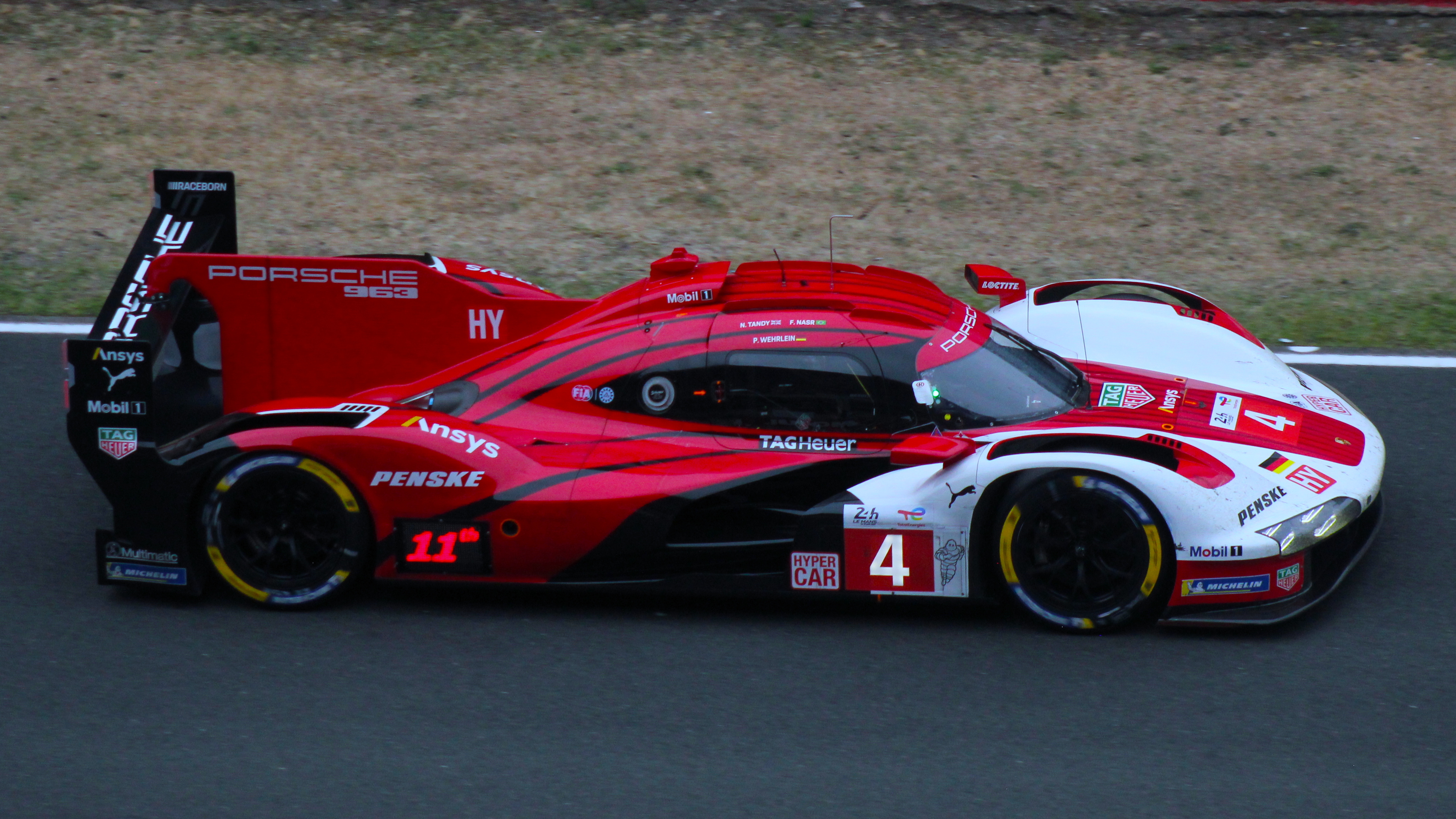
Nasr's No. 4 car at the 2025 24 Hours of Le Mans

In 2025, Nasr returned to defend his title, this time partnering Nick Tandy.

== Personal life ==
Nasr is of Lebanese ancestry, his grandfather having emigrated to Brazil in the 1960s. Nasr lists his favourite hobbies as sports, fishing and mechanics, he cites the Star Wars and James Bond film series as his favourite films, his favourite driver as Ayrton Senna, and his favourite circuit as Circuit de Spa-Francorchamps. Felipe is the nephew of Amir Nasr, who owns one of the most successful South American Formula Three racing teams that helped with the progression of many Brazilian drivers in junior formulas, such as Hélio Castroneves, Vítor Meira, Antônio Pizzonia, Luciano Burti, Bruno Junqueira, Cristiano da Matta, Mário Haberfeld, Max Wilson, Átila Abreu and Sérgio Jimenez. Nasr's favourite musical artists include Johnny Cash, Bob Dylan and Dire Straits. Nasr is multilingual with the ability to speak Portuguese, English and Italian.

== Racing record ==
=== Career summary ===
Season	Series	Team	Races	Wins	Poles	F/Laps	Podiums	Points	Position
2008	Formula BMW Americas	Amir Nasr Racing	2	0	0	0	1	25	10th
2009	Formula BMW Europe	EuroInternational	16	5	6	6	14	392	**1st**
2009	Formula BMW Pacific	EuroInternational	3	2	2	2	2	0†	NC†
2010	British Formula 3 International Series	Räikkönen Robertson Racing	30	1	1	3	4	136	5th
2010	Macau Grand Prix	Räikkönen Robertson Racing	1	0	0	0	0	N/A	11th
2011	British Formula 3 International Series	Carlin	30	7	4	8	15	318	**1st**
2011	Macau Grand Prix	Carlin	1	0	0	0	1	N/A	**2nd**
2012	GP2 Series	DAMS	24	0	0	0	4	95	10th
2012	Formula 3 Euro Series	Carlin	2	0	0	0	0	N/A	NC†
2012	Macau Grand Prix	Carlin	1	0	0	0	0	N/A	5th
2012	Rolex Sports Car Series - DP	Michael Shank Racing with Curb-Agajanian	1	0	0	0	1	30	28th
2013	GP2 Series	Carlin	22	0	0	0	6	154	4th
2014	GP2 Series	Carlin	22	4	1	2	10	224	**3rd**
2014	Formula One	Williams Martini Racing	Reserve driver						
2015	Formula One	Sauber F1 Team	19	0	0	0	0	27	13th
2016	Formula One	Sauber F1 Team	21	0	0	0	0	2	17th
2018	IMSA SportsCar Championship - Prototype	Whelen Engineering Racing	10	1	0	3	5	277	**1st**
2018	European Le Mans Series - LMP2	Cetilar Villorba Corse	5	0	0	0	0	4	26th
2018	24 Hours of Le Mans - LMP2	Cetilar Villorba Corse	1	0	0	0	0	N/A	11th
2018	Stock Car Brasil	Full Time Sports	1	0	0	0	0	0	NC†
2018–19	Formula E	GEOX Dragon	3	0	0	0	0	0	24th
2019	IMSA SportsCar Championship - DPi	Whelen Engineering Racing	10	2	1	4	5	297	**2nd**
2020	IMSA SportsCar Championship - DPi	Whelen Engineering Racing	8	1	1	1	5	232	8th
2021	IMSA SportsCar Championship - DPi	Whelen Engineering Racing	11	4	4	3	8	3407	**1st**
2022	FIA World Endurance Championship - LMP2	Team Penske	3	0	0	0	0	42	10th
2022	24 Hours of Le Mans - LMP2	Team Penske	1	0	0	0	0	N/A	5th
2022	IMSA SportsCar Championship - GTD Pro	Pfaff Motorsports	3	1	0	0	2	992	10th
2022	GT World Challenge Europe Endurance Cup	EMA Motorsport	1	0	0	0	0	2	33rd
2023	IMSA SportsCar Championship - GTP	Porsche Penske Motorsport	9	1	2	1	3	2691	5th
2023	24 Hours of Le Mans - Hypercar	Porsche Penske Motorsport	1	0	0	0	0	N/A	DNF
2024	IMSA SportsCar Championship - GTP	Porsche Penske Motorsport	9	2	0	0	7	2982	**1st**
2024	24 Hours of Le Mans - Hypercar	Porsche Penske Motorsport	1	0	0	0	0	N/A	DNF
2024	Nürburgring Langstrecken-Serie - AT(-G)	Four Motors Bioconcept-Car	1	0	0	0	0	0	NC†
2025	IMSA SportsCar Championship - GTP	Porsche Penske Motorsport	9	3	0	3	4	2689	**3rd**
2025	24 Hours of Le Mans - Hypercar	Porsche Penske Motorsport	1	0	0	0	0	N/A	8th
2026	IMSA SportsCar Championship - GTP	Porsche Penske Motorsport	9	2	0	0	2	2638	7th
2026	Stock Car Pro Series	Eurofarma RC	1	0	0	0	0	25	48th*

† – As Nasr was a guest driver, he was ineligible for points.
^{*} Season still in progress.

=== Complete Formula BMW Europe results ===
(key) (Races in bold indicate pole position; races in italics indicate fastest lap)

Year	Entrant	1	2	3	4	5	6	7	8	9	10	11	12	13	14	15	16	DC	Points
2009	EuroInternational	**CAT**; **1**; 2	**CAT**; **2**; 1	ZAN; 1; 1	ZAN; 2; 2	SIL; 1; 8	SIL; 2; 8	**NÜR**; **1**; 2	**NÜR**; **2**; 1	HUN; 1; 2	HUN; 2; 1	VSC; 1; 2	VSC; 2; 2	**SPA**; **1**; 2	**SPA**; **2**; 2	MNZ; 1; 2	MNZ; 2; 1	1st	392

=== Complete British Formula Three Championship results ===
(key) (Races in bold indicate pole position; races in italics indicate fastest lap)

Year	Entrant	Chassis	Engine	1	2	3	4	5	6	7	8	9	10	11	12	13	14	15	16	17	18	19	20	21	22	23	24	25	26	27	28	29	30	DC	Points
2010	Räikkönen Robertson Racing	Dallara F308	Mercedes HWA	OUL; 1 Ret	OUL; 2; 14	OUL; 3 Ret	SIL; 1 DNS	SIL; 2; 10	SIL; 3; 3	MAG; 1 Ret	MAG; 2; 6	MAG; 3; 7	HOC; 1 Ret	HOC; 2; 13	HOC; 3 Ret	ROC; 1; 7	ROC; 2; 15	ROC; 3; 1	SPA; 1; 7	**SPA**; **2**; 2	SPA; 3; 5	THR; 1; 7	**THR**; **2** Ret	THR; 3; 6	SIL; 1; 5	SIL; 2; 4	SIL; 3; 12	SNE; 1; 3	SNE; 2; 5	SNE; 3; 5	BRH; 1; 10	BRH; 2; 9	BRH; 3; 7	5th	136
2011	Carlin	Dallara F308	Volkswagen	MNZ; 1; 1	MNZ; 2; 2	MNZ; 3; 1	OUL; 1; 2	OUL; 2; 5	**OUL**; **3**; 1	**SNE**; **1**; 2	SNE; 2; 6	**SNE**; **3**; 17	BRH; 1; 2	BRH; 2; 6	BRH; 3; 1	NÜR; 1; 2	NÜR; 2; 4	NÜR; 3; 1	LEC; 1; 1	LEC; 2; 16	LEC; 3; 1	SPA; 1; 9	SPA; 2; 8	SPA; 3; 7	ROC; 1; 6	ROC; 2; 2	ROC; 3; 3	DON; 1 Ret	DON; 2; 10	**DON**; **3**; 9	SIL; 1; 3	SIL; 2; 7	SIL; 3 Ret	1st	318

=== Complete GP2 Series results ===
(key) (Races in bold indicate pole position; races in italics indicate fastest lap)

Year	Entrant	1	2	3	4	5	6	7	8	9	10	11	12	13	14	15	16	17	18	19	20	21	22	23	24	DC	Points
2012	DAMS	SEP; FEA; 6	SEP; SPR; 3	BHR1; FEA; Ret	BHR1; SPR; 6	BHR2; FEA; 11	BHR2; SPR; 5	CAT; FEA; 11	CAT; SPR; 9	MON; FEA; 17	MON; SPR; Ret	VAL; FEA; Ret	VAL; SPR; 14	SIL; FEA; 6	SIL; SPR; 3	HOC; FEA; 4	HOC; SPR; 3	HUN; FEA; 25†	HUN; SPR; 8	SPA; FEA; 8	SPA; SPR; 2	MNZ; FEA; Ret	MNZ; SPR; 21	MRN; FEA; 6	MRN; SPR; 7	10th	95
2013	Carlin	SEP; FEA; 4	SEP; SPR; 2	BHR; FEA; 4	BHR; SPR; 2	CAT; FEA; 2	CAT; SPR; 3	MON; FEA; 4	MON; SPR; 4	SIL; FEA; Ret	SIL; SPR; 7	NÜR; FEA; 9	NÜR; SPR; 4	HUN; FEA; 3	HUN; SPR; 5	SPA; FEA; Ret	SPA; SPR; 8	MNZ; FEA; Ret	MNZ; SPR; 12	MRN; FEA; 2	MRN; SPR; 16	YMC; FEA; 7	YMC; SPR; 18			4th	154
2014	Carlin	BHR; FEA; 8	BHR; SPR; 4	CAT; FEA; 3	CAT; SPR; 1	MON; FEA; 3	MON; SPR; Ret	RBR; FEA; 1	RBR; SPR; Ret	SIL; FEA; 7	SIL; SPR; 1	HOC; FEA; 5	HOC; SPR; 2	**HUN**; **FEA**; 6	HUN; SPR; 3	SPA; FEA; 4	SPA; SPR; 1	MNZ; FEA; 6	MNZ; SPR; 6	SOC; FEA; 17	SOC; SPR; 3	YMC; FEA; 4	YMC; SPR; 2			3rd	224

=== Complete Formula One results ===
(key) (Races in bold indicate pole position; races in italics indicates fastest lap)

Year	Entrant	Chassis	Engine	1	2	3	4	5	6	7	8	9	10	11	12	13	14	15	16	17	18	19	20	21	WDC	Points
2014	Williams Martini Racing	Williams FW36	Mercedes PU106A Hybrid 1.6 V6 t	AUS	MAL	BHR; TD	CHN; TD	ESP; TD	MON	CAN	AUT	GBR	GER	HUN	BEL	ITA	SIN	JPN	RUS	USA; TD	BRA; TD	ABU			–	–
2015	Sauber F1 Team	Sauber C34	Ferrari 060 1.6 V6 t	AUS; 5	MAL; 12	CHN; 8	BHR; 12	ESP; 12	MON; 9	CAN; 16	AUT; 11	GBR; DNS	HUN; 11	BEL; 11	ITA; 13	SIN; 10	JPN; 20^{†}	RUS; 6	USA; 9	MEX; Ret	BRA; 13	ABU; 15			13th	27
2016	Sauber F1 Team	Sauber C35	Ferrari 061 1.6 V6 t	AUS; 15	BHR; 14	CHN; 20	RUS; 16	ESP; 14	MON; Ret	CAN; 18	EUR; 12	AUT; 13	GBR; 15	HUN; 17	GER; Ret	BEL; 17	ITA; Ret	SIN; 13	MAL; Ret	JPN; 19	USA; 15	MEX; 15	BRA; 9	ABU; 16	17th	2

† Did not finish, but was classified as he had completed more than 90% of the race distance.

=== 24 Hours of Daytona results ===
Year	Team	Co-drivers	Car	Class	Laps	Pos.	Class Pos.
2012	(United States) Michael Shank Racing with Curb-Agajanian	(Venezuela) Jorge Goncalvez (United States) Michael McDowell (Colombia) Gustavo Yacamán	Riley Mk. XX	DP	761	**3rd**	**3rd**
2018	(United States) Whelen Engineering Racing	(United Kingdom) Mike Conway (United States) Eric Curran (United Kingdom) Stuart Middleton	Cadillac DPi-V.R	P	808	**2nd**	**2nd**
2019	(United States) Whelen Engineering Racing	(Brazil) Pipo Derani (United States) Eric Curran	Cadillac DPi-V.R	P	593	**2nd**	**2nd**
2020	(United States) Whelen Engineering Racing	(Portugal) Filipe Albuquerque (United Kingdom) Mike Conway (Brazil) Pipo Derani	Cadillac DPi-V.R	DPi	822	7th	7th
2021	(United States) Whelen Engineering Racing	(United Kingdom) Mike Conway (Brazil) Pipo Derani (United States) Chase Elliott	Cadillac DPi-V.R	DPi	783	8th	6th
2022	(Canada) Pfaff Motorsports	(France) Mathieu Jaminet (Australia) Matt Campbell	Porsche 911 GT3 R	GTD; Pro	711	18th	1st
2023	(Germany) Porsche Penske Motorsport	(Australia) Matt Campbell (Denmark) Michael Christensen	Porsche 963	GTP	749	14th	7th
2024	(Germany) Porsche Penske Motorsport	(United States) Dane Cameron (Australia) Matt Campbell (United States) Josef Newgarden	Porsche 963	GTP	791	1st	1st
2025	(Germany) Porsche Penske Motorsport	(United Kingdom) Nick Tandy (Belgium) Laurens Vanthoor	Porsche 963	GTP	781	1st	1st
2026	(Germany) Porsche Penske Motorsport	(France) Julien Andlauer (Germany) Laurin Heinrich	Porsche 963	GTP	705	1st	1st
Source;

=== Complete IMSA SportsCar Championship results ===
Year	Entrant	Class	Chassis	Engine	1	2	3	4	5	6	7	8	9	10	Rank	Points	Ref
2018	Whelen Engineering Racing	P	Cadillac DPi-V.R	Cadillac 5.5 L V8	DAY; 2	SEB; 3	LBH; 7	MOH; 8	BEL; 1	WGL; 7	MOS; 3	ELK; 3	LGA; 5	PET; 8	1st	277	
2019	Whelen Engineering Racing	DPi	Cadillac DPi-V.R	Cadillac 5.5 L V8	DAY; 2	SEB; 1	LBH; 6	MDO; 4	DET; 2	WGL; 7	MOS; 4	ELK; 4	LGA; 3	**PET**; 1	2nd	297	
2020	Whelen Engineering Racing	DPi	Cadillac DPi-V.R	Cadillac 5.5 L V8	DAY; 7	DAY	**SEB**; 1	ELK; 3	ATL; 3	MDO; 2	PET; 5	LGA; 3	SEB; 6		8th	232	
2021	Whelen Engineering Racing	DPi	Cadillac DPi-V.R	Cadillac 5.5 L V8	**DAY**; 6	**SEB**; 6	MDO; 2	DET; 2	WGL; 4	WGL; 1	**ELK**; 1	LGA; 3	**LBH**; 1	PET; 2	1st	3407	
2022	Pfaff Motorsports	GTD Pro	Porsche 911 GT3 R	Porsche MA1.76/MDG.G 4.0 L Flat-6	DAY; 1	SEB; 5	LBH	LGA	WGL	MOS	LIM	ELK	VIR	PET; 3	10th	992	
2023	Porsche Penske Motorsport	GTP	Porsche 963	Porsche 9RD 4.6 L V8	DAY; 7	SEB; 5	LBH; 3	**LGA**; 9	WGL; 7	MOS; 6	ELK; 1	**IMS**; 2	PET; 4		5th	2691	
2024	Porsche Penske Motorsport	GTP	Porsche 963	Porsche 9RD 4.6 L V8	DAY; 1	SEB; 3	LBH; 3	LGA; 3	DET; 4	WGL; 1	ELK; 2	IMS; 7	PET; 3		1st	2982	
2025	Porsche Penske Motorsport	GTP	Porsche 963	Porsche 9RD 4.6 L V8	DAY; 1	SEB; 1	LBH; 1	LGA; 2	DET; 4	WGL; 11	ELK; 11	IMS; 12	PET; 10		3rd	2689	
2026	Porsche Penske Motorsport	GTP	Porsche 963	Porsche 9RD 4.6 L V8	DAY; 1	SEB; 1	LBH; 4	LGA; 7	DET; 5	WGL; 5	ELK; 6	IMS; 11	PET; 8		7th	2638	

=== Complete European Le Mans Series results ===
Year	Entrant	Class	Chassis	Engine	1	2	3	4	5	6	Rank	Points
2018	Cetilar Villorba Corse	LMP2	Dallara P217	Gibson GK428 4.2 L V8	LEC	MNZ; 9	RBR; 11	SIL; 13	SPA; 10‡	ALG; 11	26th	4

^{‡} Half points awarded as less than 75% of race distance was completed.

=== Complete 24 Hours of Le Mans results ===
Year	Team	Co-Drivers	Car	Class	Laps	Pos.	Class Pos.
2018	(Italy) Cetilar Villorba Corse	(Italy) Roberto Lacorte (Italy) Giorgio Sernagiotto	Dallara P217-Gibson	LMP2	342	19th	11th
2021	(United States) Risi Competizione	(United Kingdom) Oliver Jarvis (Republic of Ireland) Ryan Cullen	Oreca 07-Gibson	LMP2	275	NC	NC
2022	(United States) Team Penske	(United States) Dane Cameron (France) Emmanuel Collard	Oreca 07-Gibson	LMP2	368	9th	5th
2023	(Germany) Porsche Penske Motorsport	(France) Mathieu Jaminet (United Kingdom) Nick Tandy	Porsche 963	Hypercar	84	DNF	DNF
2024	(Germany) Porsche Penske Motorsport	(France) Mathieu Jaminet (United Kingdom) Nick Tandy	Porsche 963	Hypercar	211	DNF	DNF
2025	(Germany) Porsche Penske Motorsport	(United Kingdom) Nick Tandy (Germany) Pascal Wehrlein	Porsche 963	Hypercar	386	8th	8th

=== Complete Stock Car Pro Series results ===
(key) (Races in bold indicate pole position) (Races in italics indicate fastest lap)

Year	Team	Car	1	2	3	4	5	6	7	8	9	10	11	12	13	14	15	16	17	18	19	20	21	22	23	Rank	Points
2018	Full Time Sports	Chevrolet Cruze	INT; 1; 4	CUR; 1	CUR; 2	VEL; 1	VEL; 2	LON; 1	LON; 2	SCZ; 1	SCZ; 2	GOI; 1	MOU; 1	MOU; 2	CAS; 1	CAS; 2	VCA; 1	VCA; 2	TAR; 1	TAR; 2	GOI; 1	GOI; 2	INT; 1			NC†	0†
2026	Eurofarma RC	Mitsubishi Eclipse Cross	CRS; 1	CRS; 2	CAS; 1	CAS; 2	INT; 1	INT; 2	GOI; 1	GOI; 2	CUI; 1	CUI; 2	VCA; 1	VCA; 2	SCZ; 1	SCZ; 2	CRS; 1	CRS; 2	BRA; 1; 15	CAS; 1	CAS; 2	VEL; 1	VEL; 2	INT; 1	INT; 2	48th*	25*

^{†} As Nasr was a guest driver, he was ineligible for points.

=== Complete Formula E results ===
(key) (Races in bold indicate pole position; races in italics indicate fastest lap)

Year	Team	Chassis	Powertrain	1	2	3	4	5	6	7	8	9	10	11	12	13	Pos	Points
2018–19	GEOX Dragon	Spark SRT05e	Penske EV-3	ADR	MRK	SCL	MEX; 19	HKG; Ret	SYX; Ret	RME	PAR	MCO	BER	BRN	NYC	NYC	24th	0

=== Complete FIA World Endurance Championship results ===
(key) (Races in bold indicate pole position; races in italics indicate fastest lap)

Year	Entrant	Class	Car	Engine	1	2	3	4	5	6	Rank	Points
2022	Team Penske	LMP2	Oreca 07	Gibson GK428 4.2 L V8	SEB; 8	SPA; 4	LMS; 4	MNZ	FUJ	BHR	10th	42

Sporting positions
Preceded by Esteban Gutiérrez	Formula BMW Europe; Champion; 2009	Succeeded by Robin Frijns
Preceded by Jean-Éric Vergne	British Formula 3 Championship; Champion; 2011	Succeeded by Jack Harvey
Preceded by Jordan Taylor; Ricky Taylor	IMSA SportsCar Championship; Champion; 2018; With: Eric Curran	Succeeded by Juan Pablo Montoya; Dane Cameron
Preceded by Filipe Albuquerque; João Barbosa; Christian Fittipaldi	North American/Michelin Endurance Cup; Champion; 2018–2019; With: Eric Curran (2018–19) & Pipo Derani (2019)	Succeeded by Ryan Briscoe; Renger van der Zande
Preceded by Hélio Castroneves; Ricky Taylor	IMSA SportsCar Championship; Champion; 2021; With: Pipo Derani	Succeeded by Tom Blomqvist; Oliver Jarvis
Preceded by Pipo Derani; Alexander Sims	IMSA SportsCar Championship; Champion; 2024; With: Dane Cameron	Succeeded by Matt Campbell; Mathieu Jaminet
Preceded by Pipo Derani; Alexander Sims; Jack Aitken	Michelin Endurance Cup; Champion; 2024-2026; With: Dane Cameron (2024), Nick Tandy (2025), Julien Andlauer & Laurin Heinrich (2026)	Succeeded by Incumbent
