= List of FIA Formula 3 European Championship drivers =

This is a List of FIA Formula 3 European Championship drivers, that is, a list of drivers who have made at least one race start in the FIA Formula 3 European Championship. Drivers of the FIA European Formula 3 Championship which held in the 1975–1984 are not included. This list is accurate up to the end of the 2018 FIA Formula 3 European Championship.

== By name ==
Key
Symbol	Meaning
~	Currently competing in Formula One (2026 season)
^	Driver has formerly competed in Formula One

Name	License	Seasons	Championship titles	Races (Starts)	Poles	Wins	Podiums	Fastest Laps	Points
Jonathan Aberdein	South Africa	2018	0	30	0	0	3	1	108
Riccardo Agostini	Italy	2014	0	9	0	0	0	0	1
Enaam Ahmed	United Kingdom	2018	0	30	2	2	4	1	174
Alexander Albon~	Thailand	2015	0	33 (31)	2	0	5	1	187
Keyvan Andres	Iran (Note: Andres raced under German racing license in 2017.)	2017-2018	0	60	0	0	1	0	18
Marcus Armstrong	Italy (Note: Armstrong is a New Zealand racing driver, who raced under Italian racing license.)	2018	0	30	2	1	8	3	260
Ralf Aron	Estonia	2016–2018	0	90 (89)	1	5	12	3	532.5
Lucas Auer	Austria	2012–2014	0	65	1	4	20	4	642
Ben Barnicoat	United Kingdom	2016	0	30	0	2	3	0	134
David Beckmann	Germany	2016–2017	0	54	0	0	2	0	112
Nicolas Beer	Denmark	2015	0	6 (4)	0	0	0	0	0
Michele Beretta	Italy	2014	0	66 (65)	0	0	0	0	4
Emil Bernstorff	United Kingdom	2012	0	20	0	0	1	0	66
Tom Blomqvist	United Kingdom	2012–2014	0	83	6	6	20	9	688.5
Dorian Boccolacci	France	2015	0	33 (32)	0	0	0	0	27
Richard Bradley	United Kingdom	2012	0	2	0	0	0	0	0
John Bryant-Meisner	Sweden	2013–2014	0	27	0	0	0	0	8
William Buller	United Kingdom	2012–2014; 2016	0	37	1	0	5	3	176
Pedro Pablo Calbimonte	Bolivia	2012	0	2	0	0	0	0	0
Tatiana Calderón	Colombia	2013–2015	0	96	0	0	0	0	29
Hongwei Cao	China	2014–2015	0	18	0	0	0	0	0
Sérgio Sette Câmara	Brazil	2014–2016	0	66	0	0	4	1	186.5
Nick Cassidy	New Zealand	2013–2016	0	39	1	1	10	1	297
Alfonso Celis Jr.	Mexico	2013–2014	0	6	0	0	0	0	0
Michela Cerruti	Italy	2013	0	9	0	0	0	0	0
Wing Chung Chang	Macau	2014–2016	0	30	0	0	0	0	0
Eddie Cheever III	Italy	2013	0	30	0	0	0	0	50
Stefano Coletti	Monaco	2013–2014	0	6 (5)	0	0	0	0	0
Jehan Daruvala	India	2017–2018	0	60	2	2	8	1	327.5
Max Defourny	Belgium	2017	0	3	0	0	0	0	2
Devlin DeFrancesco	Canada	2017–2018	0	18 (12)	0	0	0	0	0
Jake Dennis	United Kingdom	2014–2015	0	72	6	6	20	5	592
Pipo Derani	Brazil	2012–2013	0	38	0	0	3	0	143
Marvin Dienst	Germany	2015	0	3	0	0	0	0	0
Felipe Drugovich	Brazil	2017	0	3	0	0	0	0	0
Philip Ellis	United Kingdom	2012	0	6	0	0	0	0	0
Joel Eriksson	Sweden	2016–2017	0	60	6	8	24	6	640
Pietro Fantin	Brazil	2012	0	6	0	0	0	0	0
Sacha Fenestraz	France	2017–2018	0	33	2	1	3	1	122
Sebastián Fernández	Spain (Note: Fernández is a Venezuelan racing driver, who raced under Spanish racing license.)	2018	0	30	0	0	0	0	5
Santino Ferrucci	United States	2014–2015	0	54 (53)	0	0	1	1	115
Pietro Fittipaldi^	Brazil	2015	0	33 (30)	0	0	0	0	32
Petru Florescu	Romania	2017	0	24 (21)	0	0	0	0	0
Sophia Flörsch	Germany	2018	0	21	0	0	0	0	1
Adderly Fong	China	2012	0	2	0	0	0	0	0
Antonio Fuoco	Italy	2014	0	33 (32)	0	2	10	2	255
Sean Gelael	Indonesia	2013–2014	0	63	0	0	0	0	25
Mitchell Gilbert	Australia	2013–2014	0	48	0	0	0	0	38
Antonio Giovinazzi^	Italy	2013–2015	0	96 (95)	6	8	27	7	681.5
Spike Goddard	Australia (Note: Goddard raced under British racing license in 2013.)	2012–2014	0	68	0	0	0	0	3
Måns Grenhagen	Sweden	2013	0	15 (13)	0	0	0	0	0
Felipe Guimarães	Brazil	2014	0	18	0	0	0	0	5
Maximilian Günther	Germany	2015–2017	0	90	10	10	31	6	855
Ferdinand Habsburg	Austria	2017–2018	0	60	0	1	5	4	274
Julian Hanses	Germany	2018	0	24 (21)	0	0	0	0	7
Jack Harvey	United Kingdom	2012	0	6	0	0	0	0	0
Josh Hill	United Kingdom	2013	0	15	0	0	1	0	56
Ben Hingeley	United Kingdom	2018	0	30	0	0	0	0	20
Anthoine Hubert	France	2016	0	30	1	1	3	1	160
Jake Hughes	United Kingdom	2016–2017	0	33	2	1	8	2	234
Hector Hurst	United Kingdom	2014	0	24	0	0	0	0	3
Raoul Hyman	South Africa	2015–2016	0	36	0	0	0	0	15.5
Callum Ilott	United Kingdom	2015–2017	0	93	12	8	17	12	635.5
Fahmi Ilyas	Malaysia	2012	0	8	0	0	0	0	0
Jazeman Jaafar	Malaysia	2012	0	12	0	0	4	0	0
Artur Janosz	Poland	2015	0	3	0	0	0	0	0
Nabil Jeffri	Malaysia	2015	0	33	0	0	0	0	2
Mikkel Jensen	Denmark	2015–2016	0	63 (61)	1	0	3	0	224.5
Ed Jones	United Arab Emirates	2013–2014	0	24 (23)	0	0	2	0	70
Daniel Juncadella	Spain	2012	1 (2012)	20	5	5	10	5	252
Niko Kari	Finland	2016	0	30	0	1	5	0	129
Jordan King	United Kingdom	2013–2014	0	63 (62)	0	0	9	1	393
Kevin Korjus	Estonia	2013	0	3	0	0	0	0	0
Daniil Kvyat^	Russia	2013	0	21	5	1	7	1	0
Nicholas Latifi^	Canada	2013–2014	0	60	0	0	1	0	173
Charles Leclerc~	Monaco	2015	0	33	3	4	13	5	363.5
Matheus Leist	Brazil	2015	0	3	0	0	0	0	0
Charles Leong	Macau	2018	0	3	0	0	0	0	0
Michael Lewis	United States	2012–2013	0	47 (44)	0	0	3	0	124
Zhi Cong Li	China	2015–2016	0	29 (27)	0	0	0	0	0
Kang Ling	China	2015	0	24	0	0	0	0	0
Alessio Lorandi	Italy	2015–2016	0	54	1	1	2	1	122
Alex Lynn	United Kingdom	2012–2013	0	40	5	3	16	4	339.5
Sam MacLeod	United Kingdom	2015	0	30	0	0	0	0	2
Arjun Maini	India	2015–2016	0	41	0	0	0	0	30
Brandon Maïsano	France	2015	0	24 (22)	0	0	0	0	53
Tadasuke Makino	Japan	2017	0	27	0	0	1	0	57
Gustav Malja	Sweden	2015	0	3	0	0	0	0	0
Raffaele Marciello	Italy	2012–2013	1 (2013)	50	16	20	28	14	718
Jann Mardenborough	United Kingdom	2013	0	30 (29)	0	0	0	0	12
Joey Mawson	Australia	2017	0	30	0	0	1	0	83
Nikita Mazepin	Russia	2016–2017	0	60	0	0	3	0	118
Nick McBride	Australia	2012	0	6	0	0	0	0	0
Gustavo Menezes	United States	2014–2015	0	66 (65)	1	0	2	1	156
Julio Moreno	Ecuador	2015	0	33 (32)	0	0	0	0	0
Sven Müller	Germany	2012–2013	0	50	2	0	4	0	231
Felipe Nasr^	Brazil	2012	0	2 (1)	0	0	0	0	0
Harrison Newey	United Kingdom	2016–2017	0	60	0	0	0	0	128
Roy Nissany	Israel	2013–2014	0	63	0	0	0	0	37
Lando Norris~	United Kingdom	2016–2017	1 (2017)	33	8	9	20	8	441
Esteban Ocon~	France	2014	1 (2014)	33	15	9	21	7	478
Duvashen Padayachee	Australia	2012	0	6 (5)	0	0	0	0	0
Álex Palou	Spain	2018	0	30	0	0	7	2	204
Artem Petrov	Russia	2018	0	30	0	0	0	0	7
Pedro Piquet	Brazil	2016–2017	0	60	0	0	1	0	99
Nicolas Pohler	Germany	2015	0	27	0	0	0	0	0
Markus Pommer	Germany	2015	0	33	0	1	2	1	116.5
Mahaveer Raghunathan	India	2015	0	30 (26)	0	0	0	0	0
Matthew Rao	United Kingdom	2015	0	33 (32)	0	0	0	0	0
Andrea Roda	Italy	2012	0	20	0	0	0	0	8
Felix Rosenqvist	Sweden	2012–2015	1 (2015)	116	25	28	50	29	1365
André Rudersdorf	Germany	2013	0	30	0	0	0	0	3
George Russell~	United Kingdom	2015–2016	0	63	3	3	12	3	467
Carlos Sainz Jr.~	Spain	2012	0	20	2	1	5	2	161
Ukyo Sasahara	Japan	2016	0	6	0	0	0	0	0
Luís Sá Silva	Angola	2012	0	18 (16)	0	0	0	0	7
Tanart Sathienthirakul	Thailand	2015	0	3	0	0	0	0	0
Marino Sato	San Marino (Note: Sato raced under Japanese racing license in 2017.)	2017-2018	0	60	0	0	0	0	32.5
Fabio Scherer	Switzerland	2018	0	30	1	0	1	2	64
Fabian Schiller	Germany	2015	0	24	0	0	0	0	2
Harald Schlegelmilch	Latvia	2015	0	6	0	0	0	0	0
Mick Schumacher	Germany	2017-2018	1 (2018)	60	6	8	15	0	459
Félix Serrallés	Puerto Rico (Note: Serrallés raced under American racing license in 2013.)	2012–2013; 2015	0	66 (65)	2	1	5	2	104
Robert Shwartzman	Russia	2018	0	30	3	2	11	1	294
Alexander Sims	United Kingdom	2012–2014; 2015–2016	0	23	0	0	5	3	112
Matt Solomon	Hong Kong	2015	0	33	0	0	0	0	0
Lance Stroll~	Canada	2015–2016	1 (2016)	63 (62)	14	15	26	13	738
Dmitry Suranovich	Russia	2013	0	3	0	0	0	0	0
Jules Szymkowiak	Netherlands	2014	0	33	0	0	0	0	17
Weiron Tan	Malaysia	2016	0	9	0	0	0	0	0
Dan Ticktum	United Kingdom	2016, 2018	0	33	5	4	8	1	308
Harry Tincknell	United Kingdom	2012–2013	0	38	2	1	2	0	227
Gary Thompson	Japan (Note: Thompson is an Irish racing driver, who raced under Japanese racing license.)	2013	0	6	0	0	0	0	0
Alexander Toril	Spain	2014	0	30	0	0	0	0	1
Nikita Troitskiy	Russia	2018	0	30	0	1	1	2	37
Ryan Tveter	United States	2015–2016	0	54 (51)	0	0	0	0	27
Geoff Uhrhane	Australia	2012	0	8	0	0	0	0	0
Ameya Vaidyanathan	India (Note: Vaidyanathan raced first three rounds in 2018 under British racing license.)	2018	0	39	0	0	0	0	0
Hannes van Asseldonk	Netherlands	2012	0	6	0	0	0	1	0
Dennis van de Laar	Netherlands	2013–2014	0	63 (62)	0	0	0	0	60
Max Verstappen~	Netherlands	2014	0	33 (32)	6	10	16	7	411
Frederik Vesti	Denmark	2018	0	3	0	0	0	0	0
Jüri Vips	Estonia	2017-2018	0	33	3	4	8	6	284
Pascal Wehrlein^	Germany	2012–2013	0	23	3	2	9	3	248
Lucas Wolf	Germany	2012–2013	0	48 (47)	0	0	1	0	47
Sandro Zeller	Switzerland	2012–2013	0	74	0	0	0	0	0
Guanyu Zhou^	China	2016–2018	0	90	3	2	13	1	453

== By racing license ==
License	Total Drivers	Champions	Championships	First driver(s)	Last driver(s)
Angola	1	0	0	Luís Sá Silva (2012 1st Hockenheim round)	Luís Sá Silva (2012 2nd Hockenheim round)
Australia	6	0	0	Spike Goddard, Nick McBride; Duvashen Padayachee, Geoff Uhrhane (2012 Pau round)	Joey Mawson (2017 Hockenheim round)
Austria	2	0	0	Lucas Auer (2012 2nd Hockenheim round)	Ferdinand Zvonimir von Habsburg (2018 Hockenheim round)
Belgium	1	0	0	Max Defourny (2017 Nürburgring round)	Max Defourny (2017 Nürburgring round)
Bolivia	1	0	0	Pedro Pablo Calbimonte (2012 Spa round)	Pedro Pablo Calbimonte (2012 Spa round)
Brazil	9	0	0	Pietro Fantin, Felipe Nasr (2012 Pau round)	Felipe Drugovich, Pedro Piquet (2017 Hockenheim round)
Canada	3	1 (Stroll)	1 (2016)	Nicholas Latifi (2013 Monza round)	Devlin DeFrancesco (2018 Zandvoort round)
China	5	0	0	Adderly Fong (2012 Spa round)	Guanyu Zhou (2018 Hockenheim round)
Colombia	1	0	0	Tatiana Calderón (2013 Monza round)	Tatiana Calderón (2015 2nd Hockenheim round)
Denmark	3	0	0	Nicolas Beer, Mikkel Jensen (2015 Silverstone round)	Frederik Vesti (2018 Hockenheim round)
Ecuador	1	0	0	Julio Moreno (2015 Silverstone round)	Julio Moreno (2015 2nd Hockenheim round)
Estonia	3	0	0	Kevin Korjus (2013 2nd Hockenheim round)	Ralf Aron, Jüri Vips (2018 Hockenheim round)
Finland	1	0	0	Niko Kari (2016 Le Castellet round)	Niko Kari (2016 Hockenheim round)
France	5	1 (Ocon)	1 (2014)	Esteban Ocon (2014 Silverstone round)	Sacha Fenestraz (2018 Hockenheim round)
Germany	14	1 (Schumacher)	1 (2018)	Sven Müller, Pascal Wehrlein, Lucas Wolf (2012 1st Hockenheim round)	Sophia Flörsch, Julian Hanses, Mick Schumacher (2018 Hockenheim round)
Hong Kong	1	0	0	Matt Solomon (2015 Silverstone round)	Matt Solomon (2015 2nd Hockenheim round)
India	4	0	0	Arjun Maini, Mahaveer Raghunathan (2015 Silverstone round)	Jehan Daruvala, Ameya Vaidyanathan (2018 Hockenheim round)
Indonesia	1	0	0	Sean Gelael (2013 Monza round)	Sean Gelael (2014 2nd Hockenheim round)
Iran	1	0	0	Keyvan Andres (2018 Pau round)	Keyvan Andres (2018 Hockenheim round)
Israel	1	0	0	Roy Nissany (2014 Silverstone round)	Roy Nissany (2014 2nd Hockenheim round)
Italy	10	1 (Marciello)	1 (2013)	Raffaele Marciello, Andrea Roda (2012 1st Hockenheim round)	Marcus Armstrong (2018 Hockenheim round)
Japan	4	0	0	Gary Thompson (2013 Monza round)	Tadasuke Makino, Marino Sato (2017 Hockenheim round)
Latvia	1	0	0	Harald Schlegelmilch (2015 Nürburgring round)	Harald Schlegelmilch (2015 2nd Hockenheim round)
Macau	2	0	0	Wing Chung Chang (2014 Nürburgring round)	Charles Leong (2018 Silverstone round)
Malaysia	4	0	0	Fahmi Ilyas, Jazeman Jaafar (2012 Pau round)	Weiron Tan (2016 Hockenheim round)
Mexico	1	0	0	Alfonso Celis Jr. (2013 Zandvoort round)	Alfonso Celis Jr. (2014 Spielberg round)
Monaco	2	0	0	Stefano Coletti (2013 2nd Hockenheim round)	Charles Leclerc (2015 2nd Hockenheim round)
Netherlands	4	0	0	Hannes van Asseldonk (2012 1st Hockenheim round)	Jules Szymkowiak; Dennis van de Laar, Max Verstappen (2014 2nd Hockenheim round)
New Zealand	1	0	0	Nick Cassidy (2013 Norisring round)	Nick Cassidy (2016 Hockenheim round)
Poland	1	0	0	Artur Janosz (2015 Monza Round)	Artur Janosz (2015 Monza Round)
Puerto Rico	1	0	0	Félix Serrallés (2012 1st Hockenheim round)	Félix Serrallés (2015 Nürburgring Round)
Romania	1	0	0	Petru Florescu (2017 Nürburgring round)	Petru Florescu (2018 Misano round)
Russia	6	0	0	Dmitry Suranovich (2013 Monza round)	Artem Petrov, Robert Shwartzman, Nikita Troitskiy (2018 Hockenheim round)
South Africa	2	0	0	Raoul Hyman (2015 Silverstone round)	Jonathan Aberdein (2018 Hockenheim round)
Spain	5	1 (Juncadella)	1 (2012)	Daniel Juncadella, Carlos Sainz Jr. (2012 1st Hockenheim round)	Sebastián Fernández, Álex Palou (2018 Hockenheim round)
Sweden	5	1 (Rosenqvist)	1 (2015)	Felix Rosenqvist (2012 1st Hockenheim round)	Joel Eriksson (2017 Hockenheim round)
Switzerland	2	0	0	Sandro Zeller (2012 1st Hockenheim round)	Fabio Scherer (2018 Hockenheim round)
Thailand	2	0	0	Alexander Albon (2015 Silverstone round)	Alexander Albon, Tanart Sathienthirakul (2015) (2015 2nd Hockenheim round)
United Arab Emirates	1	0	0	Ed Jones (2013 1st Hockenheim round)	Ed Jones (2014 2nd Hocknheim round)
United Kingdom	25	1 (Norris)	1 (2017)	Emil Bernstorff, Tom Blomqvist; William Buller, Philip Ellis, Alex Lynn (2012 1st Hockenheim round)	Enaam Ahmed, Ben Hingeley, Dan Ticktum (2018 Hockenheim round)
United States	5	0	0	Michael Lewis (2012 1st Hockenheim round)	Ryan Tveter (2016 Spa round)
