= 2012 Masters of Formula 3 =

Formula 3 race

Race details
Date	15 July 2012
Official name	Masters of Formula 3
Location	Circuit Park Zandvoort, Netherlands
Course	4.307 km (2.676 mi)
Distance	25 laps, 107.675 km (66.906 mi)

Pole
Driver	(Spain) Daniel Juncadella	Prema Powerteam
Time	1:31.783

Fastest Lap
Driver	(Spain) Daniel Juncadella	Prema Powerteam
Time	1:33.662 (on lap 9 of 25)

Podium
First	(Spain) Daniel Juncadella	Prema Powerteam
Second	(Italy) Raffaele Marciello	Prema Powerteam
Third	(Netherlands) Hannes van Asseldonk	Fortec Motorsports

The 2012 Masters of Formula 3 was the 22nd Masters of Formula 3 race held at Circuit Park Zandvoort on 15 July 2012.

== Drivers and teams ==
2012 Entry List
Team	No	Driver	Chassis (Note: All drivers competed in Dallara chassis; model listed.)	Engine	Main series
(Germany) Mücke Motorsport	1	(Sweden) Felix Rosenqvist	F312	Mercedes	FIA European Formula 3 Championship
(Germany) Mücke Motorsport	2	(Germany) Pascal Wehrlein	F312	Mercedes	FIA European Formula 3 Championship
(United Kingdom) Carlin Motorsport	3	(Netherlands) Dennis van de Laar	F312	Volkswagen	German Formula Three
(United Kingdom) Carlin Motorsport	4	(Spain) Carlos Sainz Jr.	F312	Volkswagen	FIA European Formula 3 Championship/British Formula 3
(United Kingdom) Carlin Motorsport	5	(United Kingdom) William Buller	F312	Volkswagen	FIA European Formula 3 Championship/GP3 Series
(Italy) Prema Powerteam	7	(Italy) Raffaele Marciello	F312	Mercedes	FIA European Formula 3 Championship
(Italy) Prema Powerteam	8	(Spain) Daniel Juncadella	F312	Mercedes	FIA European Formula 3 Championship
(Italy) Prema Powerteam	9	(United States) Michael Lewis	F312	Mercedes	FIA European Formula 3 Championship
(Italy) Prema Powerteam	10	(Germany) Sven Müller	F312	Mercedes	FIA European Formula 3 Championship
(United Kingdom) Fortec Motorsport	11	(Puerto Rico) Félix Serrallés	F312	Mercedes	British Formula 3
(United Kingdom) Fortec Motorsport	12	(United Kingdom) Alex Lynn	F312	Mercedes	British Formula 3
(United Kingdom) Fortec Motorsport	14	(Netherlands) Hannes van Asseldonk	F312	Mercedes	British Formula 3
(United Kingdom) Fortec Motorsport	15	(Brazil) Pipo Derani	F312	Mercedes	British Formula 3
(Finland) Double R Racing	16	(United States) Conor Daly	F312	Mercedes	GP3 Series
(Finland) Double R Racing	17	(Australia) Geoff Uhrhane	F312	Mercedes	British Formula 3
(Switzerland) Jo Zeller Racing	18	(Italy) Andrea Roda	F312	Mercedes	FIA European Formula 3 Championship
(Switzerland) Jo Zeller Racing	30	(Switzerland) Sandro Zeller	F308	Mercedes	FIA European Formula 3 Championship
(Portugal) Angola Racing Team	19	(Angola) Luís Sá Silva	F312	Mercedes	FIA European Formula 3 Championship
(Finland) T-Sport	32	(Australia) Spike Goddard	F308	Honda	British Formula 3
(Finland) T-Sport	33	(United Kingdom) Josh Webster	F308	Honda	Formula Renault BARC

== Classification ==
=== Qualifying ===
Pos	No	Driver	Team	Q1	Q2
1	8	(Spain) Daniel Juncadella	Prema Powerteam	1:45.127	1:31.783
2	4	(Spain) Carlos Sainz Jr.	Carlin	1:45.269	1:32.312
3	7	(Italy) Raffaele Marciello	Prema Powerteam	1:46.132	1:32.433
4	14	(Netherlands) Hannes van Asseldonk	Fortec Motorsport	1:46.044	1:32.533
5	1	(Sweden) Felix Rosenqvist	Mücke Motorsport	1:46.027	1:32.555
6	2	(Germany) Pascal Wehrlein	Mücke Motorsport	1:46.051	1:32.629
7	5	(United Kingdom) William Buller	Carlin	1:45.794	1:32.698
8	10	(Germany) Sven Müller	Prema Powerteam	1:46.917	1:32.768
9	9	(United States) Michael Lewis	Prema Powerteam	1:46.417	1:32.779
10	12	(United Kingdom) Alex Lynn	Fortec Motorsport	1:45.569	1:32.782
11	15	(Brazil) Pipo Derani	Fortec Motorsport	1:46.478	1:32.878
12	11	(Puerto Rico) Félix Serrallés	Fortec Motorsport	1:47.020	1:32.915
13	3	(Netherlands) Dennis van de Laar	Carlin	1:46.541	1:33.087
14	16	(United States) Conor Daly	Double R Racing	1:46.940	1:33.963
15	17	(Australia) Geoff Uhrhane	Double R Racing	1:47.185	1:34.026
16	18	(Italy) Andrea Roda	Jo Zeller Racing	1:49.195	1:34.103
17	30	(Switzerland) Sandro Zeller	Jo Zeller Racing	1:49.432	1:34.125
18	19	(Angola) Luís Sá Silva	Angola Racing Team	1:48.709	1:34.366
19	32	(Australia) Spike Goddard	T-Sport	1:50.841	1:35.562
20	33	(United Kingdom) Josh Webster	T-Sport	1:48.234	1:36.550

=== Race ===
Pos	No	Driver	Team	Laps	Time/Retired	Grid
1	8	(Spain) Daniel Juncadella	Prema Powerteam	25	0:39:28.565	1
2	7	(Italy) Raffaele Marciello	Prema Powerteam	25	+7.594	3
3	14	(Netherlands) Hannes van Asseldonk	Fortec Motorsport	25	+17.394	4
4	4	(Spain) Carlos Sainz Jr.	Carlin	25	+18.473	2
5	2	(Germany) Pascal Wehrlein	Mücke Motorsport	25	+22.008	6
6	5	(United Kingdom) William Buller	Carlin	25	+27.611	7
7	12	(United Kingdom) Alex Lynn	Fortec Motorsport	25	+29.450	10
8	9	(United States) Michael Lewis	Prema Powerteam	25	+29.975	9
9	1	(Sweden) Felix Rosenqvist	Mücke Motorsport	25	+31.793	5
10	10	(Germany) Sven Müller	Prema Powerteam	25	+32.613	8
11	15	(Brazil) Pipo Derani	Fortec Motorsport	25	+34.110	11
12	17	(Australia) Geoff Uhrhane	Double R Racing	25	+41.954	15
13	3	(Netherlands) Dennis van de Laar	Carlin	25	+48.363	13
14	18	(Italy) Andrea Roda	Jo Zeller Racing	25	+50.978	16
15	16	(United States) Conor Daly	Double R Racing	25	+56.787	14
16	33	(United Kingdom) Josh Webster	T-Sport	25	+1:27.234	20
17	32	(Australia) Spike Goddard	T-Sport	24	+1 Lap	19
18	19	(Angola) Luís Sá Silva	Angola Racing Team	21	+4 Laps	18
Ret	30	(Switzerland) Sandro Zeller	Jo Zeller Racing	16	Retired	17
Ret	11	(Puerto Rico) Félix Serrallés	Fortec Motorsport	0	Retired	12
Fastest lap: Daniel Juncadella, 1:33.662, 165.544 km/h (102.864 mph) on lap 9
