= 2012 Macau Grand Prix =

Formula Three motor race

Race details
Date	17–18 November 2012
Official name	59th SJM Macau Grand Prix
Location	Guia Circuit, Macau
Course	Temporary street circuit 6.120 km (3.803 mi)
Distance	Qualifying Race; 10 laps, 61.200 km (38.028 mi); Main Race; 15 laps, 91.800 km (57.042 mi)
Weather	Qualifying Race: Cloudy; air 21 °C (70 °F), track 22 °C (72 °F); Main Race: Cloudy; air 20.1 °C (68.2 °F), track 22.7 °C (72.9 °F)
- Qualifying Race

Pole
Driver	(United Kingdom) Alex Lynn	Fortec Motorsport
Time	2:13.122

Fastest Lap
Driver	(Spain) Daniel Juncadella	Prema Powerteam
Time	2:13.718 (on lap 4)

Podium
First	(Portugal) António Félix da Costa	Carlin
Second	(Sweden) Felix Rosenqvist	Mücke Motorsport
Third	(United Kingdom) Alex Lynn	Fortec Motorsport
- Main Race

Pole
Driver	(Portugal) António Félix da Costa	Carlin

Fastest Lap
Driver	(Portugal) António Félix da Costa	Carlin
Time	2:13.507 (on lap 11)

Podium
First	(Portugal) António Félix da Costa	Carlin
Second	(Sweden) Felix Rosenqvist	Mücke Motorsport
Third	(United Kingdom) Alex Lynn	Fortec Motorsport

The 2012 Macau Grand Prix Formula Three was a motor race for Formula Three cars that was held on the streets of Macau on 18 November 2012. Unlike other races, such as the Pau Grand Prix, the 2012 Macau Grand Prix was not a part of any Formula Three championship, but was open to entries from all Formula Three championships. The race itself was made up of two races: a ten-lap qualifying race that decided the starting grid for the fifteen-lap main race. The 2012 race was the 59th running of the Macau Grand Prix, the 30th race for Formula Three cars, and was supported by the World Touring Car Championship Guia Race of Macau.

The Grand Prix was won by Portuguese driver António Félix da Costa from pole position, having won the event's qualification race the previous afternoon. Félix da Costa led every lap of the meeting, to take Carlin's first victory in Macau since Takuma Sato won the 2001 edition of the race. Second place went to Felix Rosenqvist, competing for Mücke Motorsport, while the podium was completed by the highest-placed rookie driver, Alex Lynn for Fortec Motorsport.

== Entry list and background ==
In order to compete at the Macau Grand Prix, drivers had to compete in any Formula Three championship race during the calendar year, rather than an FIA-regulated championship meeting like previous years. This rule was relaxed due to new sporting regulations introduced by the race's organising committee, with only Dallara's new F312 chassis being eligible to race in the event. Within the 30-car grid of the event, each of the major Formula Three series were represented by their respective champion. Defending race winner Daniel Juncadella, the Euro Series and FIA European Formula 3 champion, was joined in Macau by British champion Jack Harvey, German series winner Jimmy Eriksson and Japanese champion Ryō Hirakawa.

Five drivers who mainly competed in other series outside of Formula Three in 2012 also became eligible for the Macau race meeting: GP2 Series racer Felipe Nasr and European Le Mans Series driver Alexander Sims competed in the Euro Series – at Hockenheim, and the Nürburgring respectively – to become eligible, while GP3 Series runner-up Daniel Abt competed in the German Formula Three meeting at Spa-Francorchamps to prepare for Macau. Multiple GP3 and Formula Renault 3.5 race-winner António Félix da Costa and Formula Three debutant Kevin Korjus – another Formula Renault 3.5 competitor – had to wait until their main series campaigns had concluded before sealing their eligibility; they both competed in the MotorSport Vision Formula Three Cup, a second-tier Formula Three series in the United Kingdom, in its season-ending round at Snetterton.

The Macau Grand Prix is a Formula Three race considered to be a stepping stone to higher motor racing categories such as Formula One and has been termed the territory's most prestigious international sporting event. The 2012 Macau Grand Prix was the 59th running of the event and the 30th time the race was held to Formula Three regulations. It took place on the 6.2-kilometre (3.9 mi) twenty-two turn Guia Circuit on 18 November 2012 with three preceding days of practice and qualifying.

== Practice and qualifying ==
Nasr set the fastest time for Carlin in the 45-minute first free practice session that was held – in cloudy conditions – prior to the first qualifying session, setting a lap time over two-tenths of a second quicker than anyone else at the Guia Circuit. His closest challenger was Mücke Motorsport's Felix Rosenqvist ahead of three of Nasr's Carlin teammates: Félix da Costa, Carlos Sainz Jr. and William Buller. Defending champion Juncadella was sixth for Prema Powerteam, ahead of the best-placed Macau debutant Pascal Wehrlein. Japanese series champion Hirakawa (RSS) caused the only red flag of the session by crashing heavily at R Bend, while five other drivers – all rookies with the exception of T-Sport driver Sims – also encountered incidents during the session.

"It's obviously really great to get provisional pole but obviously tomorrow is another day where everything could change. The weather could play its part but we'll just have to take it as it comes. The track got quicker as the session went on and I was able to get my lap in at the end at the perfect time. I feel in tune with the car and I'm looking forward to seeing what the rest of the weekend brings us."

— António Félix da Costa, after setting the fastest time during the first qualifying session held on Thursday.

Qualifying was divided into two sessions, both of which were 30 minutes. One session was held on 15 November and another was held on 16 November, with the best times of each driver counting towards the starting order for the qualifying race. The first qualifying session saw Félix da Costa come out on top, by just 0.02 seconds ahead of Rosenqvist, with Sainz another thousandth of a second in arrears in third place. Alex Lynn, in his last appearance for Fortec Motorsport before moving to the Prema Powerteam in 2013, was best rookie in fourth place having held the lead of the session at one point, while Juncadella rounded out the top five. Nasr finished the session in sixth place ahead of Sims and Prema Powerteam's Raffaele Marciello – the winner of the other invitational Formula Three race held on a street circuit, at Pau in France – with Félix Serrallés and Wehrlein rounding out the top ten. Following them were Abt, Tom Blomqvist with Pipo Derani and Hannes van Asseldonk provisionally lining up on row seven. Buller, a former Formula BMW Pacific winner at Macau, was next up ahead of Harry Tincknell, Jazeman Jaafar, Harvey, Sven Müller and Korjus. Andrea Roda caused the session's only red flag by crashing at the Reservoir Bend corner. Hirakawa did not complete a lap during qualifying, as his car was still being repaired after his earlier incident during the first free practice session. For weighing incidents during free practice, Hirakawa and Andrea Roda were each given three-place grid penalties.

"Fortec put a lot of effort into all of us, we were on the simulator all the time, having meetings, going through video data every week. It was a pretty massive amount of prep, but I didn't come here with any expectations at all. I just clicked with the track, I'm not sure why. Yesterday afternoon we were pretty solid, and it's been a great day today. My honest expectations were to finish the race and finish in the top 10, and that would be a great achievement. Obviously we're in a good position to better that but I'm not going to change my approach. It's a one-off event and I'm going to give it everything I can. I'll be surprised if I can win tomorrow's qualification race. I've got so many great guys behind me and they'll probably show me how it's done, but who knows what we can do."

— Alex Lynn, after becoming the first rookie Macau pole-sitter since Kamui Kobayashi in 2006.

In the second 45-minute practice session, Rosenqvist set a benchmark in the opening third of the session and the time ultimately held to the conclusion of it, with Juncadella and Félix da Costa marginally behind in second and third places respectively. Korjus continued his progression up the time-sheets with the fourth-fastest time, while Sainz completed the top five in the session ahead of Wehrlein, the best of the rookies. The session had to be stopped once due to a problem with one of the circuit's catch-fences, although Nasr brushed the wall en route to the tenth fastest time, while Yuichi Nakayama and Luís Sá Silva both crashed within the final five minutes of the session, leaving their TOM'S and Angola Racing teams with repair work to be carried out before the second qualifying session.

The second qualifying session was delayed by 15 minutes due to an incident during qualifying for the CTM Macau Touring Car Cup race, in which 2011 Road Sport Challenge race winner Phillip Yau was killed. When the session did start, the anticipated rain showers had not materialised, and Nasr moved to the top of the time-sheets before the first of three red flags for a crash by Serrallés. For a time, track conditions were slippery due to fluids that had to be cleaned up from Serrallés' accident. Juncadella recorded the fastest time midway through the session, with a time just one thousandth slower than Félix da Costa's Thursday best. Félix da Costa's time was eventually beaten by Lynn, taking almost three-tenths of a second off the previous best time just prior to a second red flag after Lucas Auer crashed. The session was eventually abandoned after a third red flag with around two minutes remaining when Nasr crashed at R Bend. Thus, Lynn became the first rookie since Kamui Kobayashi in 2006 to take pole position at Macau, doing so by 0.278 seconds ahead of Félix da Costa, who achieved a front-row grid start for the second successive year. Juncadella moved into third place – keeping his position despite failing a fuel sample test – ahead of Rosenqvist and Sainz, with Nasr remaining sixth ahead of Tincknell, Wehrlein and Abt, who all moved up from their Thursday provisional grid slots. The top ten was completed by Marciello; behind him, the top twenty qualifiers were rounded off by van Asseldonk, Derani, Harvey, Sims, Serrallés, Blomqvist, Buller, Yuichi Yamauchi, Jaafar, Müller Hirakawa and Roda's grid penalties were effectively rendered meaningless as they qualified at the rear of the grid. Korjus, Nakayama and Roda each received penalties after second qualifying; Roda was demoted ten for an engine change, while Korjus and Nakayama each dropped one spot for irregularities in the pit lane.

=== Qualifying classification ===
Each of the driver's fastest lap times from the two qualifying sessions are denoted in bold.

Final qualifying classification
Pos	No.	Driver	Team	Q1 Time	Rank	Q2 Time	Rank	Gap	Grid
1	14	(United Kingdom) Alex Lynn	Fortec Motorsport	2:13.718	4	**2:13.122**	1		1
2	7	(Portugal) António Félix da Costa	Carlin	**2:13.400**	1	2:13.663	6	+ 0.278	2
3	1	(Spain) Daniel Juncadella	Prema Powerteam	2:13.800	5	**2:13.401**	2	+ 0.279	3
4	22	(Sweden) Felix Rosenqvist	Mücke Motorsport	**2:13.420**	2	2:13.656	5	+ 0.298	4
5	8	(Spain) Carlos Sainz Jr.	Carlin	**2:13.421**	3	2:13.666	7	+ 0.299	5
6	5	(Brazil) Felipe Nasr	Carlin	2:14.076	6	**2:13.556**	3	+ 0.434	6
7	15	(United Kingdom) Harry Tincknell	Fortec Motorsport	2:14.975	16	**2:13.577**	4	+ 0.455	7
8	23	(Germany) Pascal Wehrlein	Mücke Motorsport	2:14.397	10	**2:13.721**	8	+ 0.599	8
9	6	(Germany) Daniel Abt	Carlin	2:14.433	11	**2:13.758**	9	+ 0.636	9
10	2	(Italy) Raffaele Marciello	Prema Powerteam	2:14.266	8	**2:13.789**	10	+ 0.667	10
11	4	(Netherlands) Hannes van Asseldonk	Prema Powerteam	2:14.837	14	**2:13.885**	11	+ 0.763	11
12	16	(Brazil) Pipo Derani	Fortec Motorsport	2:14.819	13	**2:14.068**	12	+ 0.946	12
13	10	(United Kingdom) Jack Harvey	Carlin	2:15.562	18	**2:14.082**	13	+ 0.960	13
14	28	(United Kingdom) Alexander Sims	ThreeBond with T-Sport	**2:14.085**	7	2:14.848	17	+ 0.963	14
15	12	(Puerto Rico) Félix Serrallés	Fortec Motorsport	**2:14.366**	9	2:18.694	30	+ 1.244	30^{1}
16	31	(United Kingdom) Tom Blomqvist	EuroInternational	2:14.798	12	**2:14.648**	14	+ 1.526	15
17	9	(United Kingdom) William Buller	Carlin	2:14.855	15	**2:14.744**	15	+ 1.622	16
18	21	(Japan) Hideki Yamauchi	B-Max Engineering	2:16.461	22	**2:14.790**	16	+ 1.668	17
19	17	(Malaysia) Jazeman Jaafar	TOM'S	2:15.200	17	**2:15.055**	18	+ 1.933	18
20	3	(Germany) Sven Müller	Prema Powerteam	2:15.625	19	**2:15.391**	19	+ 2.269	19
21	19	(Estonia) Kevin Korjus	Double R Racing	**2:15.768**	20	2:16.720	26	+ 2.646	21^{2}
22	24	(Australia) Mitchell Gilbert	Mücke Motorsport	2:16.714	23	**2:15.804**	20	+ 2.682	20
23	18	(Japan) Yuichi Nakayama	TOM'S	2:17.705	26	**2:15.870**	21	+ 2.748	23^{3}
24	20	(Sweden) Jimmy Eriksson	Double R Racing	2:16.062	21	**2:16.015**	22	+ 2.893	22
25	29	(Austria) Lucas Auer	Van Amersfoort Racing	2:16.845	24	**2:16.187**	23	+ 3.065	24
26	30	(Netherlands) Dennis van de Laar	Van Amersfoort Racing	2:19.335	29	**2:16.559**	24	+ 3.437	25
27	27	(Angola) Luís Sá Silva	Angola Racing Team	2:18.004	27	**2:16.624**	25	+ 3.502	26
28	32	(Germany) Lucas Wolf	URD Rennsport	2:17.672	25	**2:16.766**	27	+ 3.644	27
29	11	(Japan) Ryō Hirakawa	KCMG by RSS	no time		**2:17.151**	28	+ 4.029	28^{4}
30	25	(Italy) Andrea Roda	Jo Zeller Racing	**2:18.140**	28	2:18.152	29	+ 5.018	29^{5}
110% qualifying time: 2:26.434
**Bold time** indicates the faster of the two times that determined the grid order.

Notes
^1 – Serrallés started from the back of the grid, after an engine change.
^2 – Korjus was given a one-place grid penalty for infringing pit safety regulations.
^3 – Nakayama was also given a one-place grid penalty for infringing pit safety regulations.
^4 – Hirakawa was given a three-place grid penalty, for weighing irregularities during the first free practice session.
^5 – Roda was given a three-place grid penalty, for weighing irregularities during the first free practice session. He was later given a further grid drop of ten places, for an engine change.

== Qualification Race ==
"I've felt really confident this whole weekend, we've proven today that we have great pace and we're able to break the tow to the car behind easily. The plan is going to be the same for tomorrow as today – although you can't predict anything around here. Today was another strong day for the team who have done an amazing job with not only my car but also the others. It's been a really good day for me."

— Race-winner António Félix da Costa reflecting on his race, and looking ahead to the Grand Prix itself.

Prior to the start of the race, Serrallés started from the rear of the field due to an engine change after his qualifying crash, while Korjus failed to get away from the dummy grid on the parade lap. He did start the race, albeit, from the pit lane. On the grid, it was Rosenqvist that made the best start from the second row and managed to take the lead away from a slow-starting Lynn. Félix da Costa also moved ahead of Lynn into second place, before slipstreaming up behind Rosenqvist and was able to move ahead of him under braking for Lisboa turn. Behind, Sainz made a similar move on Juncadella for fourth place at the same corner, while later on the lap, Tincknell also made a move on Juncadella to demote the defending race-winner to sixth place. The top six drivers remained in the same order until the fourth lap, when Juncadella made it back past Tincknell. Further down the field, Nakayama became the race's first retirement by crashing out at Lisboa corner.

At the front of the race, Félix da Costa was maintaining a slim lead over Rosenqvist, at around one second with Lynn a further few seconds in arrears. Sainz was leading a group of drivers in fourth place, with Juncadella, Tincknell and Wehrlein in close attendance. Juncadella set the qualification race's fastest time on the fourth lap, completing a circuit in two minutes 13.718 seconds. Ultimately, it was Félix da Costa that took victory by 1.5 seconds and pole position for the Grand Prix itself, and was joined on the front row by Rosenqvist, while Lynn completed the podium after a quiet race. Behind him, Sainz managed to hold off the others in his group to finish fourth ahead of Juncadella, Tincknell, Wehrlein, van Asseldonk, Nasr and Sims. Outside the top ten, Marciello finished eleventh ahead of Harvey, Derani, Buller, Abt, Yamauchi, Blomqvist, Jaafar, Mitchell Gilbert, Korjus, Auer, Sá Silva, Hirakawa, Dennis van de Laar and Lucas Wolf rounded out the 26 classified finishers. Joining Nakayama on the sidelines were crashers Serrallés (at Paiol on lap seven), Roda (at Lisboa on lap nine) and Müller, who also crashed on the ninth lap at Police corner.

=== Qualification Race classification ===
Final qualification race classification
Pos	No.	Driver	Team	Laps	Time/Retired	Grid
1	7	(Portugal) António Félix da Costa	Carlin	10	22:31.290	2
2	22	(Sweden) Felix Rosenqvist	Mücke Motorsport	10	+1.559	4
3	14	(United Kingdom) Alex Lynn	Fortec Motorsport	10	+4.567	1
4	8	(Spain) Carlos Sainz Jr.	Carlin	10	+7.638	5
5	1	(Spain) Daniel Juncadella	Prema Powerteam	10	+8.460	3
6	15	(United Kingdom) Harry Tincknell	Fortec Motorsport	10	+10.427	7
7	23	(Germany) Pascal Wehrlein	Mücke Motorsport	10	+11.452	8
8	4	(Netherlands) Hannes van Asseldonk	Prema Powerteam	10	+12.264	11
9	5	(Brazil) Felipe Nasr	Carlin	10	+13.243	6
10	28	(United Kingdom) Alexander Sims	ThreeBond with T-Sport	10	+14.439	14
11	2	(Italy) Raffaele Marciello	Prema Powerteam	10	+16.747	10
12	10	(United Kingdom) Jack Harvey	Carlin	10	+18.291	13
13	16	(Brazil) Pipo Derani	Fortec Motorsport	10	+21.565	12
14	9	(United Kingdom) William Buller	Carlin	10	+22.296	16
15	6	(Germany) Daniel Abt	Carlin	10	+24.338	9
16	21	(Japan) Hideki Yamauchi	B-Max Engineering	10	+24.778	17
17	20	(Sweden) Jimmy Eriksson	Double R Racing	10	+30.092	22
18	31	(United Kingdom) Tom Blomqvist	EuroInternational	10	+30.578	15
19	17	(Malaysia) Jazeman Jaafar	TOM'S	10	+32.945	18
20	24	(Australia) Mitchell Gilbert	Mücke Motorsport	10	+34.180	20
21	19	(Estonia) Kevin Korjus	Double R Racing	10	+40.698	21
22	29	(Austria) Lucas Auer	Van Amersfoort Racing	10	+42.149	24
23	27	(Angola) Luís Sá Silva	Angola Racing Team	10	+48.582	26
24	11	(Japan) Ryō Hirakawa	KCMG by RSS	10	+49.825	28
25	30	(Netherlands) Dennis van de Laar	Van Amersfoort Racing	10	+50.579	25
26	32	(Germany) Lucas Wolf	URD Rennsport	10	+50.829	27
Ret	3	(Germany) Sven Müller	Prema Powerteam	8	Accident	19
Ret	25	(Italy) Andrea Roda	Jo Zeller Racing	8	Accident	29
Ret	12	(Puerto Rico) Félix Serrallés	Fortec Motorsport	6	Accident	30
Ret	18	(Japan) Yuichi Nakayama	TOM'S	3	Accident	23
Fastest lap: Daniel Juncadella, 2:13.718, 164.765 km/h (102.380 mph) on lap 4

== Main Race ==
Weather conditions for the start of the main race were cloudy with an air temperature of 20.1 °C (68.2 °F) and a track temperature of 22.7 °C (72.9 °F). For the second day running, it was Rosenqvist that made the best start out of the front-runners, taking the lead from Félix da Costa on the run to the Mandarin corner, but Félix da Costa regained the lead under braking for Lisboa turn in a carbon-copy move to his first lap start in the qualification race. Behind, Sainz made a slow getaway from fourth place, while Sims stalled several rows behind him. The field made it cleanly out of Lisboa corner, before Sá Silva spun at the top of San Francisco Hill turn and nearly blocked the circuit while trying to return his car to the direction of the track. Around the next corner, Wolf became the race's first retirement as slight contact sent him into the barriers on the outside of Maternity Bend turn. Ultimately, the marshals had trouble extricating his car from the barriers and would eventually cause the race to be neutralised under safety car conditions; however, this did not occur for two further racing laps. Two more drivers suffered race-ending incidents during this time-frame, as van Asseldonk parked his Prema car in the Lisboa barriers on lap two while Juncadella hit the barriers at R Bend on the same lap. He was able to slowly make his way around another full lap, before retiring to the pit lane with suspension failure.

Racing resumed at the end of the fifth lap, with Félix da Costa holding onto the lead from Rosenqvist, despite pressure all the way to Lisboa turn from the pit straight. Lynn and Wehrlein fell in behind, with Nasr completing the top five, while Derani moved past Marciello for seventh place with a move down the inside under braking for Lisboa corner and later got the better of teammate Tincknell for sixth position. At the front, Félix da Costa had enough of an advantage to just about negate any threat that Rosenqvist could have made with the slipstream while Lynn continued his Macau initiation with a solid third place with Wehrlein doing likewise in fourth. Down the order, Harvey was another retiree in the pit lane due to front wing damage suffered on his Carlin car. The top five continued in their positions as the laps were continually racked off; with two laps to go, Hirakawa crashed at R Bend and was collected by Auer and left extensive debris from the corner all the way to the start-finish line. The safety car was not called for, but yellow flags were in effect until the end through that section of the course. Da Costa recorded the fastest lap of the main race on lap 11, completing a circuit in two minutes and 13.507 seconds.

"Every lap we were on the limit. I have to thank my team. They put this amazing package together. There are so many good names on the [winner's] list, and my name is there too now. It was tight between all of us, but always fair, and I think we put on a really good show out there."

— António Félix da Costa on becoming the winner of the 30th Formula Three Macau Grand Prix.

Sá Silva and van de Laar came to grief on the final lap under braking for Lisboa corner; the cars of the two drivers touched wheels and sent them into retirement, although both drivers were ultimately classified in 23rd and 24th respectively. But, on his third appearance in Macau, it was Félix da Costa's victory, leading at the end of each of the 25 racing laps to have been completed over the weekend, achieving Carlin's first victory in Macau since Takuma Sato triumphed in the 2001 edition. Rosenqvist finished second once again, 1.5 seconds in arrears, while Lynn completed the podium in a repeat of Saturday's top three placings. The race organisers played out the wrong national anthem for the winner Félix da Costa, but after several minutes, A Portuguesa, the Portuguese national anthem, played out in the former Portuguese colony. Off the podium, Wehrlein finished in fourth place ahead of Nasr, both having been distanced by the lead group during the race. Derani took sixth place, having started thirteenth, ahead of Sainz and Marciello. The top ten was rounded out by British pairing Tincknell and Buller. Outside the top ten, Eriksson finished eleventh having moved up six from his start position, and finished ahead of Abt, with Korjus 13th ahead of Yamauchi, Sims, Jaafar, Blomqvist, Gilbert, Müller, Serrallés, Nakayama, Roda and the two drivers who retired in the closing stages – Sá Silva and van de Laar – rounded out the 24 classified finishers.

=== Main Race classification ===
Final main race classification
Pos	No.	Driver	Team	Laps	Time/Retired	Grid
1	7	(Portugal) António Félix da Costa	Carlin	15	38:02.845	1
2	22	(Sweden) Felix Rosenqvist	Mücke Motorsport	15	+1.573	2
3	14	(United Kingdom) Alex Lynn	Fortec Motorsport	15	+2.486	3
4	23	(Germany) Pascal Wehrlein	Mücke Motorsport	15	+3.471	7
5	5	(Brazil) Felipe Nasr	Carlin	15	+9.127	9
6	16	(Brazil) Pipo Derani	Fortec Motorsport	15	+11.043	13
7	8	(Spain) Carlos Sainz Jr.	Carlin	15	+11.417	4
8	2	(Italy) Raffaele Marciello	Prema Powerteam	15	+14.376	11
9	15	(United Kingdom) Harry Tincknell	Fortec Motorsport	15	+16.944	6
10	9	(United Kingdom) William Buller	Carlin	15	+21.650	14
11	20	(Sweden) Jimmy Eriksson	Double R Racing	15	+22.955	17
12	6	(Germany) Daniel Abt	Carlin	15	+24.025	15
13	19	(Estonia) Kevin Korjus	Double R Racing	15	+24.632	21
14	21	(Japan) Hideki Yamauchi	B-Max Engineering	15	+26.502	16
15	28	(United Kingdom) Alexander Sims	ThreeBond with T-Sport	15	+26.757	10
16	17	(Malaysia) Jazeman Jaafar	TOM'S	15	+27.834	19
17	31	(United Kingdom) Tom Blomqvist	EuroInternational	15	+28.565	18
18	24	(Australia) Mitchell Gilbert	Mücke Motorsport	15	+31.899	20
19	3	(Germany) Sven Müller	Prema Powerteam	15	+32.744	27
20	12	(Puerto Rico) Félix Serrallés	Fortec Motorsport	15	+33.276	29
21	18	(Japan) Yuichi Nakayama	TOM'S	15	+47.525	30
22	25	(Italy) Andrea Roda	Jo Zeller Racing	15	+59.222	28
23	27	(Angola) Luís Sá Silva	Angola Racing Team	14	Collision	23
24	30	(Netherlands) Dennis van de Laar	Van Amersfoort Racing	14	Collision	25
Ret	11	(Japan) Ryō Hirakawa	KCMG by RSS	12	Collision	24
Ret	29	(Austria) Lucas Auer	Van Amersfoort Racing	12	Collision	22
Ret	10	(United Kingdom) Jack Harvey	Carlin	12	Front wing	12
Ret	1	(Spain) Daniel Juncadella	Prema Powerteam	2	Suspension	5
Ret	4	(Netherlands) Hannes van Asseldonk	Prema Powerteam	1	Accident	8
Ret	32	(Germany) Lucas Wolf	URD Rennsport	0	Collision	26
Fastest lap: António Félix da Costa, 2:13.507, 165.025 km/h (102.542 mph) on lap 11
