= Andrea Roda =

Italian racing driver (born 1990)

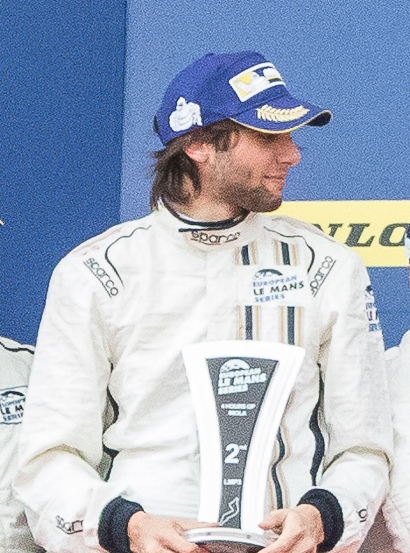
- Roda in 2016
- Nationality: (Italy) Italian
- Born: 11 April 1990 (age 36) Como, Italy
- Relatives: Gianluca Roda (father); Davide Roda (uncle); Giorgio Roda (brother)
- Categorisation: FIA Silver

Championship titles
- 2016–17: Asian Le Mans Series – LMP2

Andrea Roda (born 11 April 1990) is an Italian racing driver and businessman who last competed in the LMP2 class of the European Le Mans Series for Algarve Pro Racing. He was crowned Asian Le Mans Series champion in 2016–17.

== Personal life ==
Roda is the son of former racing driver Gianluca Roda, who is also the CEO of Rodacciai S.p.A., a company founded by Giuseppe Roda (1925–2007) in 1956. His uncle Davide is also a racing driver, as is his brother Giorgio, who won the 2018 European Le Mans Series title in LMGTE alongside Gianluca.

In 2013, Roda began working at RodaSteel Corporation AG, the Swiss branch of his family's company, as its Director.

== Racing career ==
Roda began his single-seater career in 2006, racing in the Challenge Formula Ford Formula Junior 1600 and Formula Renault 2.0 Italia Winter Series. Continuing in Formula Renault 2.0 for 2007, Roda raced in the Italian main and winter series, as well as making select appearances in the Swiss championship. Another season in the Italian series with Tomcat Racing then followed in 2008, before switching to BVM Minardi Team for 2009, a season in which he took a lone podium at Monza to end the year 12th in points. During 2009, Roda also made select appearances in Eurocup Formula Renault 2.0 for them, as well as a one-off appearance in International Formula Master as part of the series' Talent Support Program.

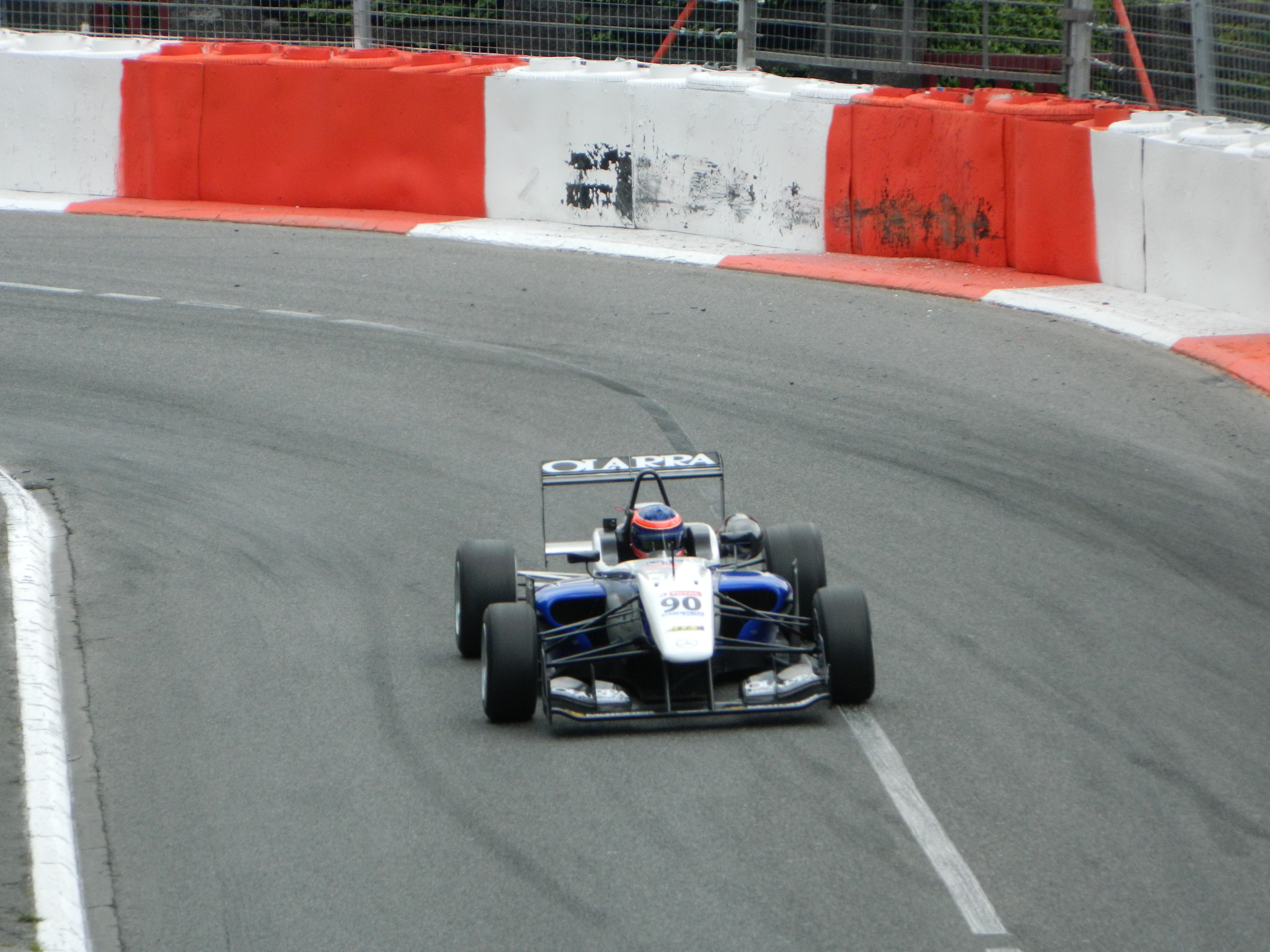
Roda racing at the Pau Grand Prix in 2012.

Stepping up to Italian F3 for 2010, Roda raced with RC Motorsport in his rookie year, before switching to Prema Powerteam for the following year. In 2012, Roda joined Jo Zeller Racing for a dual campaign in the Formula 3 Euro Series and the FIA Formula 3 European Championship. Finishing 13th and 12th in the two series standings with a best result of eighth at Zandvoort, in a season in which he also made appearances in the Masters of Formula 3 and Macau Grand Prix.

The following year, Roda joined Virtuosi UK to step up to Auto GP. In his first season with the team, Roda scored a best result of fourth at both Mugello and Brno to end the year 12th in points. Remaining with Virtuosi for 2014, Roda took his maiden series podium at the Hungaroring, before taking further podiums at Monza and Imola, and his only series win at the Red Bull Ring en route to a fourth-place points finish. During 2014, Roda also raced in the Monaco round of the Formula Renault 3.5 Series for Comtec Racing, as well as making his sportscar debut with Sébastien Loeb Racing in the LMP2 class of the European Le Mans Series.

In 2015, Roda began the year by competing in the first two rounds of the Blancpain Endurance Series for Audi-fielding ISR, before joining Algarve Pro Racing to race in the last three rounds of the European Le Mans Series in LMP2. Staying in ELMS for 2016, Roda competed in the first two rounds for EuroInternational in LMP3, taking a best result of second at Imola, before jumping back to Algarve Pro Racing's LMP2 squad for Le Castellet. At the end of the year, Roda continued with the team to compete in the 2016–17 Asian Le Mans Series, taking a lone win at Sepang and finishing on the podium in the other three races to secure the LMP2 title by two points over teammate Andrea Pizzitola. For the rest of 2017, Roda remained with the Portuguese team for his only full-time season in the LMP2 class of the European Le Mans Series, where he placed 20th.

== Offshore powerboat career ==
In late 2023, Roda began competing in offshore powerboat racing events alongside his father Gianluca, as his co-driver.

== Racing record ==
=== Racing career summary ===
Season	Series	Team	Races	Wins	Poles	F/Laps	Podiums	Points	Position
2006	Challenge Formula Ford Formula Junior 1600								
2006	Formula Junior 1.6 Italia							2	21st
2006	Formula Renault 2.0 Italia Winter Series	Tomcat Racing	4	0	0	0	0	0	22nd
2007	Formula Renault 2.0 Italia	Tomcat Racing	13	0	0	0	0	0	45th
2007	LO Formule Renault 2.0 Suisse	Tomcat Racing	4	0	0	0	0	7	29th
2007	Formula Renault 2.0 Italia Winter Series	Tomcat Racing	4	0	0	0	0	9	17th
2008	Formula Renault 2.0 Italia	Tomcat Racing	14	0	0	0	0	13	26th
2008	Formula 2000 Light	Tomcat Racing	2	0	0	0	0	0	51st
2009	Formula Renault 2.0 Italia	BVM Minardi Team	12	0	0	0	1	112	12th
2009	Eurocup Formula Renault 2.0	BVM Minardi Team	6	0	0	0	0	0	40th
2009	International Formula Master	IFM Talent Support Program	2	0	0	0	0	0	NC†
2010	Italian Formula Three Championship	RC Motorsport	16	0	0	0	0	1	22nd
2011	Italian Formula Three Championship	Prema Powerteam	16	0	0	0	0	20	12th
2012	Formula 3 Euro Series	Jo Zeller Racing	24	0	0	0	0	15	13th
2012	FIA Formula 3 European Championship	Jo Zeller Racing	20	0	0	0	0	8	12th
2012	British Formula 3 International Series	Jo Zeller Racing	7	0	0	0	0	0	NC†
2012	Masters of Formula 3	Jo Zeller Racing	1	0	0	0	0	—N/a	14th
2012	Macau Grand Prix	Jo Zeller Racing	1	0	0	0	0	—N/a	22nd
2013	Auto GP Series	Virtuosi UK	16	0	0	0	0	45	12th
2014	Auto GP Series	Virtuosi UK	16	1	0	0	5	166	4th
2014	Formula Renault 3.5 Series	Comtec Racing	1	0	0	0	0	0	28th
2014	European Le Mans Series – LMP2	Sébastien Loeb Racing	1	0	0	0	0	8	24th
2015	Blancpain Endurance Series – Pro	ISR	1	0	0	0	0	0	NC
2015	European Le Mans Series – LMP2	Algarve Pro Racing	3	0	0	0	0	11	17th
2016	European Le Mans Series – LMP3	EuroInternational	2	0	0	0	1	18	14th
2016	European Le Mans Series – LMP2	Algarve Pro Racing	1	0	0	0	0	6	30th
2016–17	Asian Le Mans Series – LMP2	Algarve Pro Racing	4	1	2	0	4	78	**1st**
2017	European Le Mans Series – LMP2	Algarve Pro Racing	5	0	0	0	0	4	22nd

^{†} As Roda was a guest driver, he was ineligible to score points.

=== Complete Italian Formula Three Championship results ===
(key) (Races in bold indicate pole position) (Races in italics indicate fastest lap)

Year	Entrant	1	2	3	4	5	6	7	8	9	10	11	12	13	14	15	16	DC	Points
2010	RC Motorsport	MIS; 1; 26	MIS; 2; 14	HOC; 1; 18	HOC; 2; 13	IMO; 1; 18	IMO; 2 Ret	MUG1; 1; 18	MUG1; 2 Ret	VAR; 1; 14	VAR; 2; 14	VLL; 1; 10	VLL; 2 Ret	MUG2; 1; 14	MUG2; 2; 17	MNZ; 1; 11	MNZ; 2; 18	22nd	1
2011	Prema Powerteam	FRA; 1; 12	FRA; 2; 12	MIS; 1; 11	MIS; 2 Ret	IMO; 1; 8	IMO; 2; 9	SPA; 1; 11	SPA; 2; 11	ADR; 1; 10	ADR; 2; 7	VLL; 1; 8	VLL; 2; 10	MUG; 1; 12	MUG; 2; 11	MNZ; 1; 7	MNZ; 2; 9	12th	20

=== Complete Formula 3 Euro Series results ===
(key)

Year	Entrant	Chassis	Engine	1	2	3	4	5	6	7	8	9	10	11	12	13	14	15	16	17	18	19	20	21	22	23	24	DC	Points
2012	Jo Zeller Racing	Dallara F312	Mercedes	HOC1; 1 Ret	HOC1; 2; 16	HOC1; 3; 14	BRH; 1; 14	BRH; 2; 15	BRH; 3; 11	RBR; 1; 10	RBR; 2; 11	RBR; 3 Ret	NOR; 1; 16	NOR; 2; 19	NOR; 3; 13	NÜR; 1; 13	NÜR; 2; 14	NÜR; 3 Ret	ZAN; 1; 13	ZAN; 2; 11	ZAN; 3; 8	VAL; 1; 9	VAL; 2; 9	VAL; 3; 10	HOC2; 1; 12	HOC2; 2; 18	HOC2; 3; 13	13th	15

=== Complete FIA Formula 3 European Championship results ===
(key)

Year	Entrant	Engine	1	2	3	4	5	6	7	8	9	10	11	12	13	14	15	16	17	18	19	20	DC	Points
2012	Jo Zeller Racing	Mercedes	HOC; 1 Ret	HOC; 2; 14	PAU; 1; 19	PAU; 2 Ret	BRH; 1; 14	BRH; 2; 11	RBR; 1; 10	RBR; 2 Ret	NOR; 1; 16	NOR; 2; 13	SPA; 1; 19	SPA; 2; 16	NÜR; 1; 13	NÜR; 2 Ret	ZAN; 1; 13	ZAN; 2; 8	VAL; 1; 9	VAL; 2; 10	HOC; 1; 12	HOC; 2; 13	12th	8

=== Complete Auto GP results ===
(key) (Races in bold indicate pole position) (Races in italics indicate fastest lap)

Year	Entrant	1	2	3	4	5	6	7	8	9	10	11	12	13	14	15	16	Pos	Points
2013	Virtuosi UK	MNZ; 1 Ret	MNZ; 2; 11	MAR; 1; 7	MAR; 2; 7	HUN; 1; 9	HUN; 2; 12	SIL; 1 Ret	SIL; 2; 15	MUG; 1; 4	MUG; 2; 10	NÜR; 1; 14	NÜR; 2; 9	DON; 1; 9	DON; 2; 12	BRN; 2; 7	BRN; 2; 4	12th	45
2014	Virtuosi UK	MAR; 1; 7†	MAR; 2; 4	LEC; 1; 5	LEC; 2; 7	HUN; 1; 3	HUN; 2; 5	MNZ; 1; 4	MNZ; 2; 2	IMO; 1; 3	IMO; 2; 8	RBR; 1; 3	RBR; 2; 1	NÜR; 1; 5	NÜR; 2; 4	EST; 1; 5	EST; 2; 8	4th	166

=== Complete European Le Mans Series results ===
Year	Entrant	Class	Chassis	Engine	1	2	3	4	5	6	Rank	Points
2014	Sébastien Loeb Racing	LMP2	Oreca 03	Nissan VK45DE 4.5 L V8	SIL	IMO	RED	LEC; 6	EST		24th	8
2015	Algarve Pro Racing	LMP2	Ligier JS P2	Nissan VK45DE 4.5 L V8	SIL	IMO	RBR; 10	LEC; 8	EST; 7		17th	11
2016	EuroInternational	LMP3	Ligier JS P3	Nissan VK50VE 5.0 L V8	SIL; Ret	IMO; 2	RBR				14th	18
2016	Algarve Pro Racing	LMP2	Ligier JS P2	Nissan VK45DE 4.5 L V8				LEC; 7	SPA	EST	30th	6
2017	Algarve Pro Racing	LMP2	Ligier JS P217	Gibson GK428 4.2 L V8	SIL; Ret	MNZ; Ret	RBR; Ret	LEC; 8	SPA; Ret	ALG; 11	20th	4.5

=== Complete Blancpain GT Series results ===
==== Blancpain GT Series Endurance Cup ====
(key) (Races in bold indicate pole position; races in italics indicate fastest lap)

Year	Team	Car	Class	1	2	3	4	5	6	7	Pos.	Points
2015	ISR	Audi R8 LMS ultra	Pro	MNZ; DNS	SIL; 55	LEC	SPA; 6H	SPA; 12H	SPA; 24H	NÜR	NC	0

=== Complete Asian Le Mans Series results ===
(key) (Races in bold indicate pole position) (Races in italics indicate fastest lap)

Year	Team	Class	Car	Engine	1	2	3	4	Pos.	Points
2016–17	Algarve Pro Racing	LMP2	Ligier JS P2	Judd HK 3.6 L V8	ZHU; 2				1st	78
2016–17	Algarve Pro Racing	LMP2	Ligier JS P2	Nissan VK45DE 4.5 L V8		**FUJ**; 3	CHA; 2	**SEP**; 1	1st	78
