= 2012 British Formula 3 International Series =

Seasons
- ← 2011 2013 →

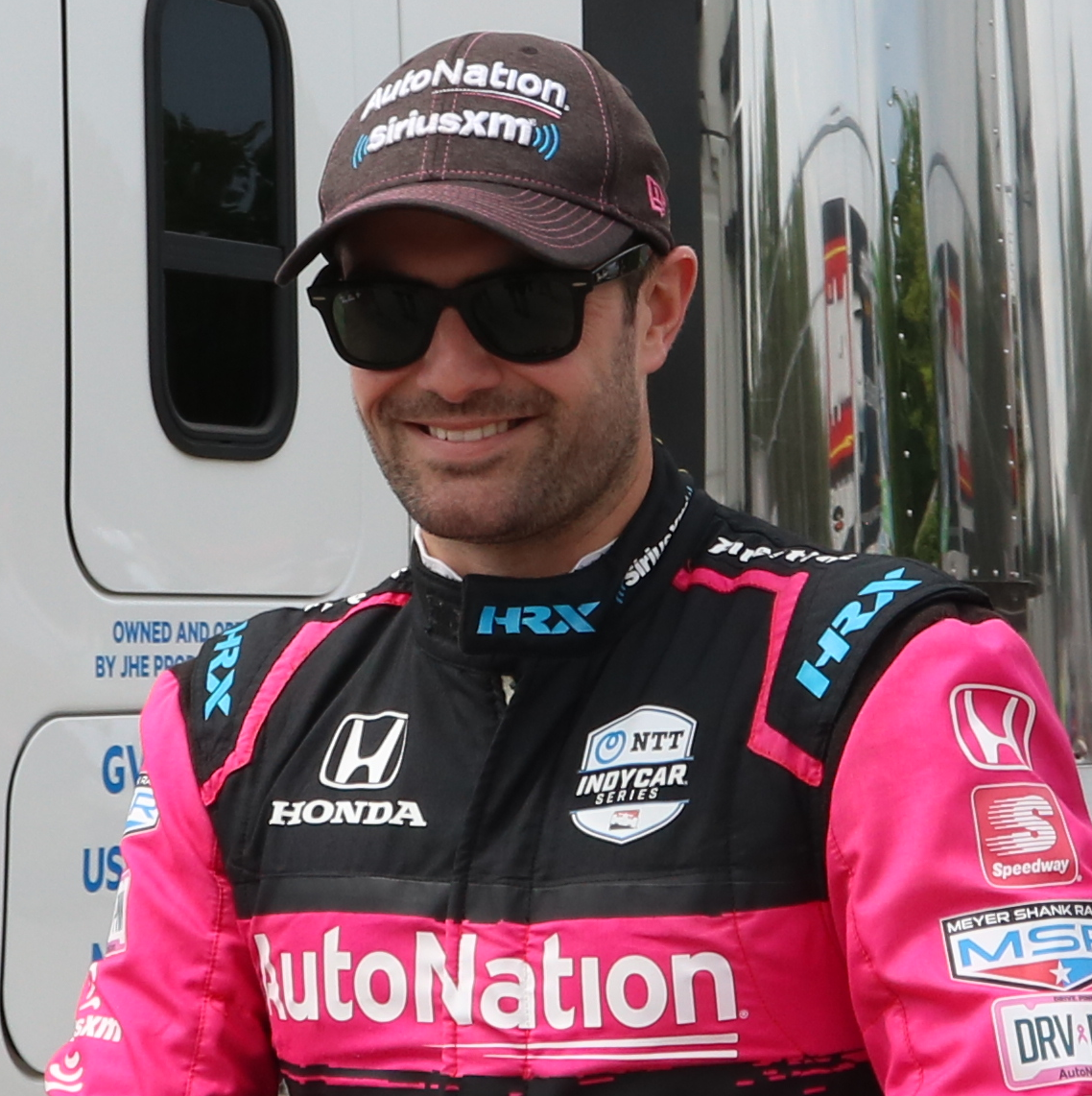
2012 champion, Jack Harvey

The 2012 Cooper Tires British Formula 3 International Series season is the 62nd British Formula 3 International Series season. The series, promoted by the Stéphane Ratel Organisation, began on 6 April at Oulton Park and ended on 30 September at Donington Park after 28 races held at ten meetings.

The first two poles of the season were claimed at Oulton Park by second-year driver Jack Harvey for the Carlin team, and he won the opening race of the year ahead of teammates Jazeman Jaafar and Carlos Sainz Jr. In the reverse-grid second race, Fortec Motorsports' Pipo Derani scored his first win in the series, while teammate Félix Serrallés won the third race of the weekend in his first Formula Three meeting. A week later at Monza, Serralles and Sainz claimed their first poles in Formula Three. Rain before the start of the first race forced drivers to change from slick tyres, and in effect, the race started from the pit lane. Sainz, Jr. left pit lane first and won his first race in the championship. Derani and Jaafar, who had left the pits seventh and eighth respectively, joined Sainz, Jr. on the podium, while Serralles finished tenth. Serralles won the second race held in torrential rain, ahead of Harvey and teammate Pietro Fantin, while Sainz, Jr. comfortably won the third race, almost seventeen seconds clear of Serralles, with Serralles' teammate Alex Lynn taking his first podium in third place.

== Regulation changes ==
In a change to the 2011 season, all races award championship points on the same points system. Previously, the second race had awarded points on a reduced scale – 10 points for the winner and decreasing by one point down to tenth place – compared to races one and three.

== Drivers and teams ==
- For the Norisring event, drivers used different numbers in line with Formula 3 Euro Series regulations; each driver's Norisring race number is displayed in tooltips.

Team	Chassis	Engine	No.	Driver	Rounds
International Class
(United Kingdom) Carlin	Dallara F312	Volkswagen	1	(United Kingdom) Jack Harvey	All
(United Kingdom) Carlin	Dallara F312	Volkswagen	2	(Brazil) Pietro Fantin	All
(United Kingdom) Carlin	Dallara F312	Volkswagen	21	(United Kingdom) Harry Tincknell	All
(United Kingdom) Carlin	Dallara F312	Volkswagen	22	(Malaysia) Jazeman Jaafar	All
(United Kingdom) Carlin	Dallara F312	Volkswagen	31	(Spain) Carlos Sainz Jr.	1–9
(United Kingdom) Fortec Motorsport	Dallara F312	Mercedes HWA	3	(Brazil) Pipo Derani	All
(United Kingdom) Fortec Motorsport	Dallara F312	Mercedes HWA	4	(Puerto Rico) Félix Serrallés	All
(United Kingdom) Fortec Motorsport	Dallara F312	Mercedes HWA	23	(Netherlands) Hannes van Asseldonk	All
(United Kingdom) Fortec Motorsport	Dallara F312	Mercedes HWA	36	(United Kingdom) Alex Lynn	All
(Finland) ThreeBond with T-Sport	Dallara F312	ThreeBond Nissan	12	(Australia) Nick McBride	All
(Finland) Double R Racing	Dallara F312	Mercedes HWA	26	(Australia) Geoff Uhrhane	All
(Finland) Double R Racing	Dallara F312	Mercedes HWA	27	(Malaysia) Fahmi Ilyas	1–8
(Finland) Double R Racing	Dallara F312	Mercedes HWA	32	(United Kingdom) Rupert Svendsen-Cook	9–10
Rookie Class
(Finland) ThreeBond with T-Sport	Dallara F311	Mugen-Honda	42	(Australia) Spike Goddard	All
(Finland) ThreeBond with T-Sport	Dallara F311	Mugen-Honda	44	(Bolivia) Pedro Pablo Calbimonte	7–10
(United Kingdom) CF Racing	Dallara F311	Mugen-Honda	43	(Hong Kong) Adderly Fong	5, 7–8
(United Kingdom) CF Racing	Dallara F311	Mugen-Honda	43	(United Kingdom) Hywel Lloyd	10
(Finland) Double R Racing	Dallara F309	Mugen-Honda	77	(Australia) Duvashen Padayachee	All
International Class
(Germany) GU-Racing	Dallara F312	Mercedes-Benz	10	(United Kingdom) Philip Ellis	6
(United Kingdom) Carlin	Dallara F312	Volkswagen	11	(United Kingdom) William Buller	6
(United Kingdom) Carlin	Dallara F312	Volkswagen	71	(United Kingdom) Richard Bradley	7
(Germany) Mücke Motorsport	Dallara F312	Mercedes HWA	85	(Sweden) Felix Rosenqvist	3, 6–7
(Germany) Mücke Motorsport	Dallara F312	Mercedes HWA	86	(Germany) Pascal Wehrlein	3, 6–7
(Switzerland) Jo Zeller Racing	Dallara F312	Mercedes HWA	90	(Italy) Andrea Roda	3, 6–7
(Switzerland) Jo Zeller Racing	Dallara F308	Mercedes HWA	91	(Switzerland) Sandro Zeller	3, 6–7
(Germany) ma-con Motorsport	Dallara F312	Volkswagen	92	(United Kingdom) Emil Bernstorff	3, 6–7
(Germany) ma-con Motorsport	Dallara F312	Volkswagen	93	(United Kingdom) Tom Blomqvist	3, 6–7
(Germany) URD Rennsport	Dallara F312	Mercedes-Benz	94	(Germany) Lucas Wolf	6–7
(Portugal) Angola Racing Team	Dallara F312	Mercedes-Benz	95	(Angola) Luís Sá Silva	6–7
(Italy) Prema Powerteam	F312	Mercedes HWA	96	(Spain) Daniel Juncadella	3, 6–7
(Italy) Prema Powerteam	F312	Mercedes HWA	97	(Germany) Sven Müller	3, 6–7
(Italy) Prema Powerteam	F312	Mercedes HWA	98	(United States) Michael Lewis	3, 6–7
(Italy) Prema Powerteam	F312	Mercedes HWA	99	(Italy) Raffaele Marciello	3, 6–7

=== Driver changes ===
Changed Teams

- Pipo Derani, who finished in fifteenth place in 2011, moved from Double R Racing to Fortec Motorsports.
- Pietro Fantin switched from Hitech Racing to Carlin.
- After a season with Fortec Motorsports, Fahmi Ilyas joined Double R Racing.
- Harry Tincknell changed teams for his second season in British F3 moving from Fortec Motorsports to Carlin.

Entering/Re-Entering British Formula Three

- British Formula Ford racers Spike Goddard and Nick McBride moved into the championship with T-Sport. Fellow Formula Ford compatriot Geoff Uhrhane joined Double R Racing.
- Formula Renault UK champion Alex Lynn continued his collaboration with Fortec Motorsports for another season, moving into Formula Three. Félix Serrallés also continued his collaboration with Fortec Motorsports, moving from the Formula Renault Eurocup.
- JK Racing Asia Series driver Duvashen Padayachee graduated into the championship with Double R Racing.
- Formula Renault 2.0 NEC champion and Eurocup runner-up Carlos Sainz Jr. made his debut with Carlin.
- After finishing fifth in German Formula Three, Dutch driver Hannes van Asseldonk moved full-time to the British series with Fortec Motorsports. Van Asseldonk previously contested one round in 2011, as an invitational driver.

Leaving British Formula Three

- Donington winner Valtteri Bottas left the series to concentrate on his Williams F1 reserve driver duties.
- António Félix da Costa joined Carlin in the GP3 Series.
- Mitch Evans, who participated in the final round with Double R Racing, remained in the GP3 Series with MW Arden.
- 2011 runner-up Kevin Magnussen remained with Carlin, but moved into the Formula Renault 3.5 Series. Third-placed Carlos Huertas, seventh-placed Lucas Foresti and 26th-placed Yann Cunha also moved into the series for Fortec Motorsports, DAMS and Pons Racing respectively.
- 2011 champion Felipe Nasr switched to DAMS for his GP2 Series debut.
- Scott Pye returned to his native Australia to compete in the Dunlop V8 Supercar Series, having finished in tenth place for Double R Racing.
- Alexander Sims, who won at Silverstone, switched to endurance racing as he joined Status Grand Prix to compete in the European Le Mans Series.
- Max Snegirev moved into the Auto GP World Series, with the Campos Racing team.

== Race calendar and results ==
On 12 October 2011, it was revealed that the series was due to have three overseas rounds, at the Nürburgring, Spa-Francorchamps – both on the calendar in 2011 – and Pau. Pau returns to the series' schedule for the first time since 2006.

A provisional ten-round calendar was later announced on 7 November 2011, with the Nürburgring round removed, and rounds at Le Castellet and Monza, both of which held meetings in 2011, being restored to the calendar to make up four overseas rounds along with Spa-Francorchamps and Pau. All rounds were made up of three races except Pau, where only two races were held. On 21 April, it was announced that the series would add the Formula 3 Euro Series round at the Norisring in place of the round at Paul Ricard; the event would be held under Euro Series regulations. The rounds at Pau, Spa and the Norisring would be part of the revived FIA European Formula 3 Championship. The championship supported the British GT Championship at six rounds, two Blancpain Endurance Series events at Monza and Spa along with the Pau Grand Prix event and Formula 3 Euro Series event at Norisring.

Round		Circuit	Date	Pole position	Fastest lap	Winning driver	Winning team	Rookie winner
1	R1	(United Kingdom) Oulton Park	7 April	(United Kingdom) Jack Harvey	(Netherlands) Hannes van Asseldonk	(United Kingdom) Jack Harvey	(United Kingdom) Carlin	(Australia) Spike Goddard
1	R2	(United Kingdom) Oulton Park	7 April		(Brazil) Pipo Derani	(Brazil) Pipo Derani	(United Kingdom) Fortec Motorsports	(Australia) Spike Goddard
1	R3	(United Kingdom) Oulton Park	7 April	(United Kingdom) Jack Harvey	(Puerto Rico) Félix Serrallés	(Puerto Rico) Félix Serrallés	(United Kingdom) Fortec Motorsports	(Australia) Spike Goddard
2	R1	(Italy) Autodromo Nazionale Monza	14 April	(Puerto Rico) Félix Serrallés	(United Kingdom) Alex Lynn	(Spain) Carlos Sainz Jr.	(United Kingdom) Carlin	(Australia) Spike Goddard
2	R2	(Italy) Autodromo Nazionale Monza	15 April		(Puerto Rico) Félix Serrallés	(Puerto Rico) Félix Serrallés	(United Kingdom) Fortec Motorsports	(Australia) Duvashen Padayachee
2	R3	(Italy) Autodromo Nazionale Monza	15 April	(Spain) Carlos Sainz Jr.	(Spain) Carlos Sainz Jr.	(Spain) Carlos Sainz Jr.	(United Kingdom) Carlin	(Australia) Spike Goddard
3	R1	(France) Pau Circuit	12 May	(Italy) Raffaele Marciello	(Malaysia) Jazeman Jaafar (Note: Fastest lap recorded by Raffaele Marciello, but he was ineligible to score the fastest lap point.)	(Italy) Raffaele Marciello	(Italy) Prema Powerteam	(Australia) Spike Goddard
3	R2	(France) Pau Circuit	13 May	(Italy) Raffaele Marciello	(Brazil) Pipo Derani	(Italy) Raffaele Marciello	(Italy) Prema Powerteam	(Switzerland) Sandro Zeller
4	R1	(United Kingdom) Rockingham Motor Speedway	9 June	(United Kingdom) Jack Harvey	(Netherlands) Hannes van Asseldonk	(Malaysia) Jazeman Jaafar	(United Kingdom) Carlin	(Australia) Spike Goddard
4	R2	(United Kingdom) Rockingham Motor Speedway	10 June		(Brazil) Pietro Fantin	(United Kingdom) Harry Tincknell	(United Kingdom) Carlin	(Australia) Duvashen Padayachee
4	R3	(United Kingdom) Rockingham Motor Speedway	10 June	(United Kingdom) Jack Harvey	(United Kingdom) Jack Harvey	(United Kingdom) Jack Harvey	(United Kingdom) Carlin	(Australia) Duvashen Padayachee
5	R1	(United Kingdom) Brands Hatch	23 June	(United Kingdom) Jack Harvey	(Malaysia) Jazeman Jaafar	(United Kingdom) Jack Harvey	(United Kingdom) Carlin	(Hong Kong) Adderly Fong
5	R2	(United Kingdom) Brands Hatch	24 June		(United Kingdom) Harry Tincknell	(Brazil) Pipo Derani	(United Kingdom) Fortec Motorsports	(Hong Kong) Adderly Fong
5	R3	(United Kingdom) Brands Hatch	24 June	(United Kingdom) Jack Harvey	(United Kingdom) Jack Harvey	(United Kingdom) Jack Harvey	(United Kingdom) Carlin	(Hong Kong) Adderly Fong
6	R1	(Germany) Norisring, Nuremberg	30 June	(Italy) Raffaele Marciello	(United Kingdom) Jack Harvey (Note: Harvey and Serralles each scored a point towards the championship, after setting identical fastest lap times among British series competitors; Raffaele Marciello set the overall fastest lap.) (Puerto Rico) Félix Serrallés	No winner (Note: Daniel Juncadella was disqualified from the first Norisring race after collisions with Pascal Wehrlein and Raffaele Marciello. As drivers were not promoted in the race results, no driver was officially recognised as having finished in first place.)		(Switzerland) Sandro Zeller
6	R2	(Germany) Norisring, Nuremberg	30 June		(Puerto Rico) Félix Serrallés (Note: Fastest lap recorded by William Buller, but he was ineligible to score the fastest lap point.)	(United Kingdom) Harry Tincknell	(United Kingdom) Carlin	(Switzerland) Sandro Zeller
6	R3	(Germany) Norisring, Nuremberg	1 July	(Germany) Pascal Wehrlein	(Netherlands) Hannes van Asseldonk	(Italy) Raffaele Marciello	(Italy) Prema Powerteam	(Australia) Spike Goddard
7	R1	(Belgium) Circuit de Spa-Francorchamps	27 July	(Puerto Rico) Félix Serrallés	(Puerto Rico) Félix Serrallés	(Puerto Rico) Félix Serrallés	(United Kingdom) Fortec Motorsports	(Switzerland) Sandro Zeller
7	R2	(Belgium) Circuit de Spa-Francorchamps	27 July	Race cancelled due to heavy rain				
7	R3	(Belgium) Circuit de Spa-Francorchamps	28 July	(Puerto Rico) Félix Serrallés	(Spain) Carlos Sainz Jr.	(Spain) Carlos Sainz Jr.	(United Kingdom) Carlin	(Hong Kong) Adderly Fong
8	R1	(United Kingdom) Snetterton Motor Racing Circuit	4 August	(United Kingdom) Jack Harvey	(United Kingdom) Jack Harvey	(United Kingdom) Jack Harvey	(United Kingdom) Carlin	(Hong Kong) Adderly Fong
8	R2	(United Kingdom) Snetterton Motor Racing Circuit	5 August		(Malaysia) Jazeman Jaafar	(United Kingdom) Harry Tincknell	(United Kingdom) Carlin	(Hong Kong) Adderly Fong
8	R3	(United Kingdom) Snetterton Motor Racing Circuit	5 August	(United Kingdom) Jack Harvey	(United Kingdom) Jack Harvey	(Spain) Carlos Sainz Jr.	(United Kingdom) Carlin	(Hong Kong) Adderly Fong
9	R1	(United Kingdom) Silverstone Circuit	8 September	(United Kingdom) Alex Lynn	(United Kingdom) Alex Lynn	(Malaysia) Jazeman Jaafar	(United Kingdom) Carlin	(Australia) Spike Goddard
9	R2	(United Kingdom) Silverstone Circuit	9 September		(Brazil) Pietro Fantin	(Puerto Rico) Félix Serrallés	(United Kingdom) Fortec Motorsports	(Australia) Duvashen Padayachee
9	R3	(United Kingdom) Silverstone Circuit	9 September	(United Kingdom) Alex Lynn	(United Kingdom) Alex Lynn	(United Kingdom) Alex Lynn	(United Kingdom) Fortec Motorsports	(Australia) Spike Goddard
10	R1	(United Kingdom) Donington Park	29 September	(United Kingdom) Jack Harvey	(United Kingdom) Alex Lynn	(United Kingdom) Jack Harvey	(United Kingdom) Carlin	(United Kingdom) Hywel Lloyd
10	R2	(United Kingdom) Donington Park	30 September		(Brazil) Pietro Fantin	(United Kingdom) Harry Tincknell	(United Kingdom) Carlin	(United Kingdom) Hywel Lloyd
10	R3	(United Kingdom) Donington Park	30 September	(United Kingdom) Jack Harvey	(United Kingdom) Alex Lynn	(United Kingdom) Jack Harvey	(United Kingdom) Carlin	(United Kingdom) Hywel Lloyd

== Championship standings ==
Pos	Driver	OUL (United Kingdom)			MNZ (Italy)			PAU (France)		ROC (United Kingdom)			BRH (United Kingdom)			NOR (Germany)			SPA (Belgium)			SNE (United Kingdom)			SIL (United Kingdom)			DON (United Kingdom)			Pts
Championship Class
1	(United Kingdom) Jack Harvey	1	6	2	7	2	8	5	8	5	3	1	1	9	1	14	7	Ret	4	C	6	1	4	3	8	2	8	1	6	1	319
2	(Malaysia) Jazeman Jaafar	2	3	5	3	5	4	2	3	1	6	4	2	6	2	18	14	Ret	5	C	4	7	2	5	1	3	2	2	Ret	3	306
3	(Puerto Rico) Félix Serrallés	7	7	1	10	1	2	8	19	3	4	6	6	2	9	5	2	3	1	C	3	2	6	2	7	1	7	4	4	8	299
4	(United Kingdom) Alex Lynn	5	Ret	6	5	7	3	3	7	2	7	2	3	8	4	19	9	9	6	C	11	3	5	4	4	6	1	3	Ret	2	253
5	(United Kingdom) Harry Tincknell	4	4	3	Ret	9	6	7	Ret	7	1	Ret	5	15	3	8	1	10	13	C	9	12	1	7	3	13	3	8	1	4	226
6	(Spain) Carlos Sainz Jr.	3	5	4	1	8	1	6	2	10	12	3	4	4	Ret	Ret	25	19	3	C	1	Ret	11	1	2	7	5				223
7	(Brazil) Pietro Fantin	8	2	7	6	3	Ret	14	12	6	2	9	8	3	5	4	8	6	16	C	19	NC	8	9	5	4	6	6	3	6	195
8	(Brazil) Pipo Derani	9	1	Ret	2	6	7	Ret	5	9	8	7	9	1	Ret	Ret	16	21	8	C	7	Ret	7	8	9	Ret	11	7	2	5	146
9	(Netherlands) Hannes van Asseldonk	Ret	8	Ret	4	DNS	5	11	Ret	4	5	5	Ret	10	7	20	10	5	23	C	18	4	15	6	Ret	8	4	5	5	7	132
10	(Australia) Nick McBride	10	11	9	8	4	9	15	14	8	9	10	7	7	6	13	24	15	18	C	15	6	3	15	Ret	10	12	10	8	10	85
11	(Malaysia) Fahmi Ilyas	6	Ret	8	9	10	10	9	15	Ret	10	8	11	5	10	Ret	Ret	12	21	C	21	5	Ret	10							48
12	(Australia) Geoff Uhrhane	Ret	10	10	12	11	Ret	16	18	Ret	11	12	10	11	8	12	15	Ret	15	C	Ret	9	10	11	Ret	9	10	11	9	11	35
13	(United Kingdom) Rupert Svendsen-Cook																								6	5	9	9	7	9	24
Guest drivers ineligible for points
	(Italy) Raffaele Marciello							1	1							22	17	1	11	C	14										0
	(Spain) Daniel Juncadella							Ret	4							DSQ	11	2	2	C	8										0
	(United Kingdom) William Buller															2	5	18													0
	(United Kingdom) Tom Blomqvist							13	21							10	6	7	10	C	2										0
	(United Kingdom) Emil Bernstorff							Ret	13							3	Ret	4	17	C	10										0
	(Germany) Pascal Wehrlein							Ret	9							7	3	Ret	14	C	12										0
	(Sweden) Felix Rosenqvist							4	6							6	4	14	9	C	Ret										0
	(United States) Michael Lewis							10	11							Ret	13	8	7	C	5										0
	(Germany) Sven Müller							12	10							9	Ret	11	12	C	Ret										0
	(Italy) Andrea Roda							19	Ret							16	19	13	19	C	16										0
	(Germany) Lucas Wolf															Ret	20	22	20	C	13										0
	(Angola) Luís Sá Silva															15	18	16	26	C	20										0
	(United Kingdom) Philip Ellis															Ret	21	Ret													0
	(United Kingdom) Richard Bradley																		21	C	Ret										0
Rookie Class
1	(Australia) Spike Goddard	11	9	11	11	Ret	11	17	20	11	14	Ret	13	13	Ret	17	22	17	28	C	23	10	14	14	10	12	13	14	11	15	426
2	(Australia) Duvashen Padayachee	12	12	12	Ret	12	12	DNS	17	12	13	11	Ret	14	12	21	23	20	25	C	24	11	13	16	12	11	14	15	13	14	377
3	(Hong Kong) Adderly Fong												12	12	11				27	C	17	8	9	12							161
4	(Bolivia) Pedro Pablo Calbimonte																		29	C	22	Ret	12	13	11	Ret	15	13	12	13	125
5	(United Kingdom) Hywel Lloyd																											12	10	12	61
Guest drivers ineligible for points
	(Switzerland) Sandro Zeller							18	16							11	12	23	22	C	25										0
Pos	Driver	OUL (United Kingdom)			MNZ (Italy)			PAU (France)		ROC (United Kingdom)			BRH (United Kingdom)			NOR (Germany)			SPA (Belgium)			SNE (United Kingdom)			SIL (United Kingdom)			DON (United Kingdom)			Pts
