= William Buller (racing driver) =

British racing driver

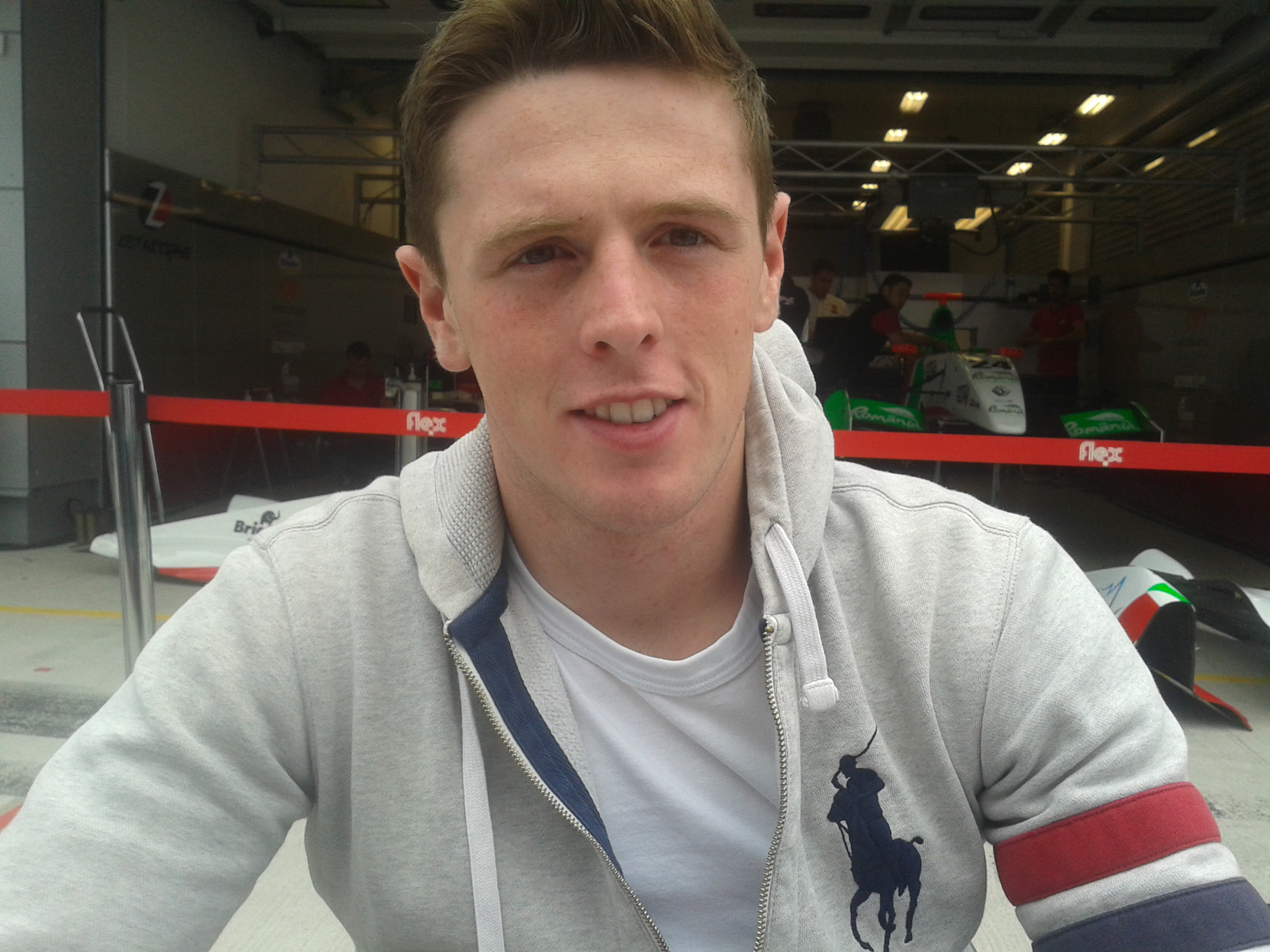
- Buller in 2013
- Nationality: (United Kingdom) British
- Born: William Alfred Buller; 17 September 1992 (age 34) Scarva, County Down, Northern Ireland

Formula V8 3.5 Series career
- Debut season: 2013
- Current team: RP Motorsport
- Categorisation: FIA Silver
- Car number: 21
- Former teams: Arden Motorsport, Zeta Corse
- Starts: 29
- Wins: 0
- Poles: 0
- Fastest laps: 0
- Best finish: 11th in 2013

Previous series
- 2012-13 2012 2010–12 2009 2008–09 2008–09 2008 2008 2008 2007: FIA European F3 Championship; GP3 Series; British Formula 3 Formula BMW Pacific; Toyota Racing Series; Formula BMW Europe; FR2.0 UK Winter Series; FR2.0 Portugal Winter Series; Formula BMW Americas; T Cars

William Alfred Buller (born 17 September 1992) is a British former racing driver.

== Career ==
=== T Cars ===
After successful spells in both karting and mini stocks, Buller made his circuit racing debut in the 2007 T Cars championship; the series designed for aspiring racing drivers between fourteen and seventeen years of age. Driving for Calvin Motorsport, Buller finished as series runner-up behind Daniel Brown, winning five races, including a hat-trick at Brands Hatch and finished on the podium in a further five races.

=== Formula BMW ===
Despite being only fifteen, Buller moved up into the newly created Formula BMW Europe series for 2008, which had been formed from the merger of the British and German series. Driving for Fortec Motorsport, Buller took twelfth in the championship standings, taking the fastest lap at the final race at Monza. Buller also made a guest appearance in the Formula BMW Americas series, driving for Autotecnica at the Canadian Grand Prix-supporting rounds of the championship. He finished fourteenth and ninth in the two races, and also finished ninth in the World Final for EuroInternational.

At the conclusion of the season, Buller competed in the Winter Series of both the British and Portuguese Formula Renault series, and also the Toyota Racing Series in New Zealand. He finished fifth in both Formula Renault championships, and he finished in the top ten of the Toyota Racing Series, despite competing in only three of the six rounds.

Buller returned to Formula BMW in 2009, again staying with Fortec. A first win proved elusive, although he did take a pole position at Silverstone, and also finished third at the Nürburgring, en route to tenth in the championship. Buller made a guest appearance for EuroInternational at the final round of the Formula BMW Pacific championship in Macau. He dominated the weekend, winning from pole position with fastest lap to boot, holding off team-mate Jim Pla to win the race.

=== Formula Three ===
Buller would move into the British Formula 3 Championship for the 2010 season, driving for Hitech Racing. Prior to the season beginning, he also won the inaugural Formula 3 Brazil Open race in São Paulo for Hitech, his debut in a Formula Three car.

In April 2012, it was confirmed that Buller would join Carlin for the newly christened European F3 Championship. The calendar would comprise eight F3 Euro Series rounds and a pair of events from the British championship.

In 2013 Buller, started the FIA European Formula Three Championship with Threebond by T-Sport driving a Nissan powered Dallara F312. During winter testing, he proved to be quick, regularly topping the timing sheets. When results during the first part of the season did not match the expectations, he decided to halt the campaign and focus on the British F3 Championship with Fortec Motorsport.

=== GP3 Series ===
Buller would also compete in the GP3 Series in 2012, again linking up with the Carlin squad. He had a fairly quiet season, apart from an incredible victory from the back of the grid at Silverstone in Race Two. However, despite tying with teammate António Félix da Costa for best victory of the season, Buller was not retained by the team for 2013.

=== Formula Renault 3.5 ===
In 2013, Formula Renault 3.5 team Zeta Corse confirmed Buller to be their sixth driver in only four race weekends after Emmanuel Piget, Mihai Marinescu, Mathéo Tuscher, Carlos Sainz Jr. and Nick Yelloly. Buller made his debut at Moscow Raceway in Russia, and in the first race finished a very strong fifth place. He followed that up with a fifth and sixth-place finishes at the Red Bull Ring in Austria alongside new teammate Riccardo Agostini.

Buller stated his desire to continue his Formula Renault 3.5 campaign with Zeta after confirming his discontinuation of his European Formula Three campaign for 2013, and running alongside his British Formula 3 campaign.

=== Super Formula ===
In 2015, Buller sign to Kondo Racing for Japanese Super Formula series. Teammate is the British driver James Rossiter.

=== SXS Racing ===
In 2020, Buller took up highly competitive off-road Side by Side racing – sxsracing.co.uk . Initially starting out in a 1000cc Yamaha YXZ, Buller placed sixth in the 1000 Experts class in 2021. The start of the 2022 season saw Buller switch to a more commonly used machine, the Polaris RS1.

== Racing record ==
=== Career summary ===
Season	Series	Team	Races	Wins	Poles	F/Laps	Podiums	Points	Position
2007	T Cars	Calvin Motorsport	16	5	2	2	10	134	**2nd**
2008	Formula BMW Europe	Fortec Motorsport	16	0	0	1	0	87	12th
2008	Formula Renault 2.0 Portugal Winter Series	Fortec Motorsport	2	0	0	0	1	18	5th
2008	Formula Renault 2.0 UK Winter Series	Fortec Competition	4	0	0	0	0	58	5th
2008	Formula BMW Americas	Autotecnica	2	0	0	0	0	0	NC†
2008	Formula BMW World Final	EuroInternational	1	0	0	0	0	N/A	9th
2008–09	Toyota Racing Series	Giles Motorsport	9	2	0	2	3	467	10th
2009	Formula BMW Europe	Fortec Motorsport	16	0	1	0	1	113	10th
2009	Formula BMW Pacific	EuroInternational	1	1	1	1	1	0	NC†
2010	Formula 3 Brazil Open	Hitech Racing Brazil	1	1	0	1	1	N/A	**1st**
2010	British Formula 3 International Series	Hitech Racing	30	0	0	1	5	111	8th
2010	Masters of Formula 3	Hitech Racing	1	0	0	0	0	N/A	11th
2010	Macau Grand Prix	Fortec Motorsport	1	0	0	0	0	N/A	15th
2011	British Formula 3 International Series	Fortec Motorsport	30	3	3	4	9	197	4th
2011	Macau Grand Prix	Fortec Motorsport	1	0	0	0	0	N/A	6th
2012	GP3 Series	Carlin	16	1	0	0	1	20	15th
2012	Formula 3 Euro Series	Carlin	24	2	1	1	8	182.5	5th
2012	FIA Formula 3 European Championship	Carlin	16	0	1	0	5	137	6th
2012	Masters of Formula 3	Carlin	1	0	0	0	0	N/A	6th
2012	Macau Grand Prix	Carlin	1	0	0	0	0	N/A	10th
2013	FIA Formula 3 European Championship	ThreeBond with T-Sport	12	0	0	0	0	39	16th
2013	FIA Formula 3 European Championship	Fortec Motorsports	3	0	0	0	0	39	16th
2013	British Formula 3 International Series	Fortec Motorsports	12	1	6	0	7	134	**3rd**
2013	Formula Renault 3.5 Series	Zeta Corse	10	0	0	0	0	46	11th
2014	Formula Renault 3.5 Series	Arden Motorsport	17	0	0	0	1	30	16th
2015	Super Formula	Kondō Racing	8	0	0	0	0	0	19th
2016	Super Formula	Kondō Racing	9	0	0	0	0	0	19th
2016	FIA Formula 3 European Championship	Carlin	3	0	0	0	0	0	24th
2016	Formula V8 3.5 Series	RP Motorsport	2	0	0	0	0	7	16th

=== Complete Formula 3 Euroseries results ===
(key) (Races in bold indicate pole position; races in italics indicate fastest lap)

Year	Entrant	Engine	1	2	3	4	5	6	7	8	9	10	11	12	13	14	15	16	17	18	19	20	21	22	23	24	D.C.	Points
2012	Carlin	Volkswagen	HOC; 1; 4	HOC; 2; 4	HOC; 3; 6	BRH; 1; 15	BRH; 2; 10	BRH; 3; 2	**RBR**; **1**; 8	RBR; 2; 1	RBR; 3; 2	NOR; 1; 2	NOR; 2; 5	NOR; 3; 18	NÜR; 1; 10	NÜR; 2; 10	NÜR; 3; 2	ZAN; 1; 8	ZAN; 2; 1	ZAN; 3; 2	VAL; 1; 6	VAL; 2; 5	VAL; 3; 9	HOC; 1; 6	HOC; 2; 5	HOC; 3 Ret	5th	182.5

=== Complete FIA European Formula 3 Championship results ===
(key)

Year	Entrant	Engine	1	2	3	4	5	6	7	8	9	10	11	12	13	14	15	16	17	18	19	20	21	22	23	24	25	26	27	28	29	30	DC	Points
2012	Carlin	Volkswagen	HOC; 1; 4	HOC; 2; 6	PAU; 1	PAU; 2	BRH; 1; 15	BRH; 2; 2	**RBR**; **1**; 8	RBR; 2; 2	NOR; 1; 2	NOR; 2; 18	SPA; 1	SPA; 2	NÜR; 1; 10	NÜR; 2; 2	ZAN; 1; 8	ZAN; 2; 2	VAL; 1; 6	VAL; 2; 9	HOC; 1; 6	HOC; 2 Ret											6th	137
2013	ThreeBond with T-Sport	ThreeBond Nissan	MNZ; 1; 4	MNZ; 2 Ret	MNZ; 3; 7	SIL; 1; 7	SIL; 2; 9	SIL; 3; 5	HOC; 1; 9	HOC; 2; 11	HOC; 3; 17	BRH; 1; 9	BRH; 2; 9	BRH; 3; 12																			16th	39
2013	Fortec Motorsports	Mercedes													RBR; 1; 14	RBR; 2; 16	RBR; 3; 14	NOR; 1	NOR; 2	NOR; 3	NÜR; 1	NÜR; 2	NÜR; 3	ZAN; 1	ZAN; 2	ZAN; 3	VAL; 1	VAL; 2	VAL; 3	HOC; 1	HOC; 2	HOC; 3	16th	39
2016	Carlin	Volkswagen	LEC; 1	LEC; 2	LEC; 3	HUN; 1	HUN; 2	HUN; 3	PAU; 1	PAU; 2	PAU; 3	RBR; 1	RBR; 2	RBR; 3	NOR; 1 Ret	NOR; 2 Ret	NOR; 3; 12	ZAN; 1	ZAN; 2	ZAN; 3	SPA; 1	SPA; 2	SPA; 3	NÜR; 1	NÜR; 2	NÜR; 3	IMO; 1	IMO; 2	IMO; 3	HOC; 1	HOC; 2	HOC; 3	24th	0

=== Complete GP3 Series results ===
(key) (Races in bold indicate pole position) (Races in italics indicate fastest lap)

Year	Entrant	1	2	3	4	5	6	7	8	9	10	11	12	13	14	15	16	DC	Points
2012	Carlin	CAT; FEA; 23	CAT; SPR; 9	MON; FEA; 12	MON; SPR; Ret	VAL; FEA; 10	VAL; SPR; 9	SIL; FEA; Ret	SIL; SPR; 1	HOC; FEA; 9	HOC; SPR; Ret	HUN; FEA; 23	HUN; SPR; 12	SPA; FEA; 13	SPA; SPR; 8	MNZ; FEA; 10	MNZ; SPR; 12	15th	20

=== Complete Formula Renault 3.5 Series results ===
(key) (Races in bold indicate pole position) (Races in italics indicate fastest lap)

Year	Team	1	2	3	4	5	6	7	8	9	10	11	12	13	14	15	16	17	18	Pos.	Points
2013	Zeta Corse	MNZ; 1	MNZ; 2	ALC; 1	ALC; 2	MON; 1	SPA; 1	SPA; 2	MSC; 1; 5	MSC; 2; 20	RBR; 1; 6	RBR; 2; 5	HUN; 1 Ret	HUN; 2; 16	LEC; 1; 8	LEC; 2; 8	CAT; 1; 5	CAT; 2 Ret		11th	46
2014	Arden Motorsport	MNZ; 1; 4	MNZ; 2 Ret	ALC; 1 Ret	ALC; 2 Ret	MON; 1; 16	SPA; 1; 11	SPA; 2; 12	MSC; 1; 11	MSC; 2; 10	NÜR; 1 Ret	NÜR; 2; 10	HUN; 1; 19	HUN; 2 Ret	LEC; 1; 17	LEC; 2; 10	JER; 1 Ret	JER; 2; 3		16th	30
2016	RP Motorsport	ALC; 1	ALC; 2	HUN; 1	HUN; 2	SPA; 1	SPA; 2	LEC; 1	LEC; 2	SIL; 1	SIL; 2	RBR; 1	RBR; 2	MNZ; 1; 10	MNZ; 2; 7	JER; 1	JER; 2	CAT; 1	CAT; 2	16th	7

=== Complete Super Formula Results ===
(key) (Races in bold indicate pole position; races in italics indicate fastest lap)

Year	Team	Engine	1	2	3	4	5	6	7	8	9	DC	Points
2015	Kondo Racing	Toyota	SUZ; 14	OKA; 13	FUJ; 14	MOT; 13	AUT; 18	SUG; 15	SUZ; 13	SUZ; 13		19th	0
2016	Kondo Racing	Toyota	SUZ; 15	OKA; 11	FUJ; Ret	MOT; 13	OKA; 15	OKA; 15	SUG; 10	SUZ; 13	SUZ; 13	19th	0

== Personal life ==
Buller's hobbies are water sports, training and playing football. His favourite drivers are Fernando Alonso and Kimi Räikkönen, while his favourite circuits are Circuit de Spa-Francorchamps and Rockingham Motor Speedway.

Sporting positions
Preceded by Inaugural	Formula 3 Brazil Open; Winner; 2010	Succeeded by Lucas Foresti
