= Luís Sá Silva =

Angolan racing driver (born 1990)

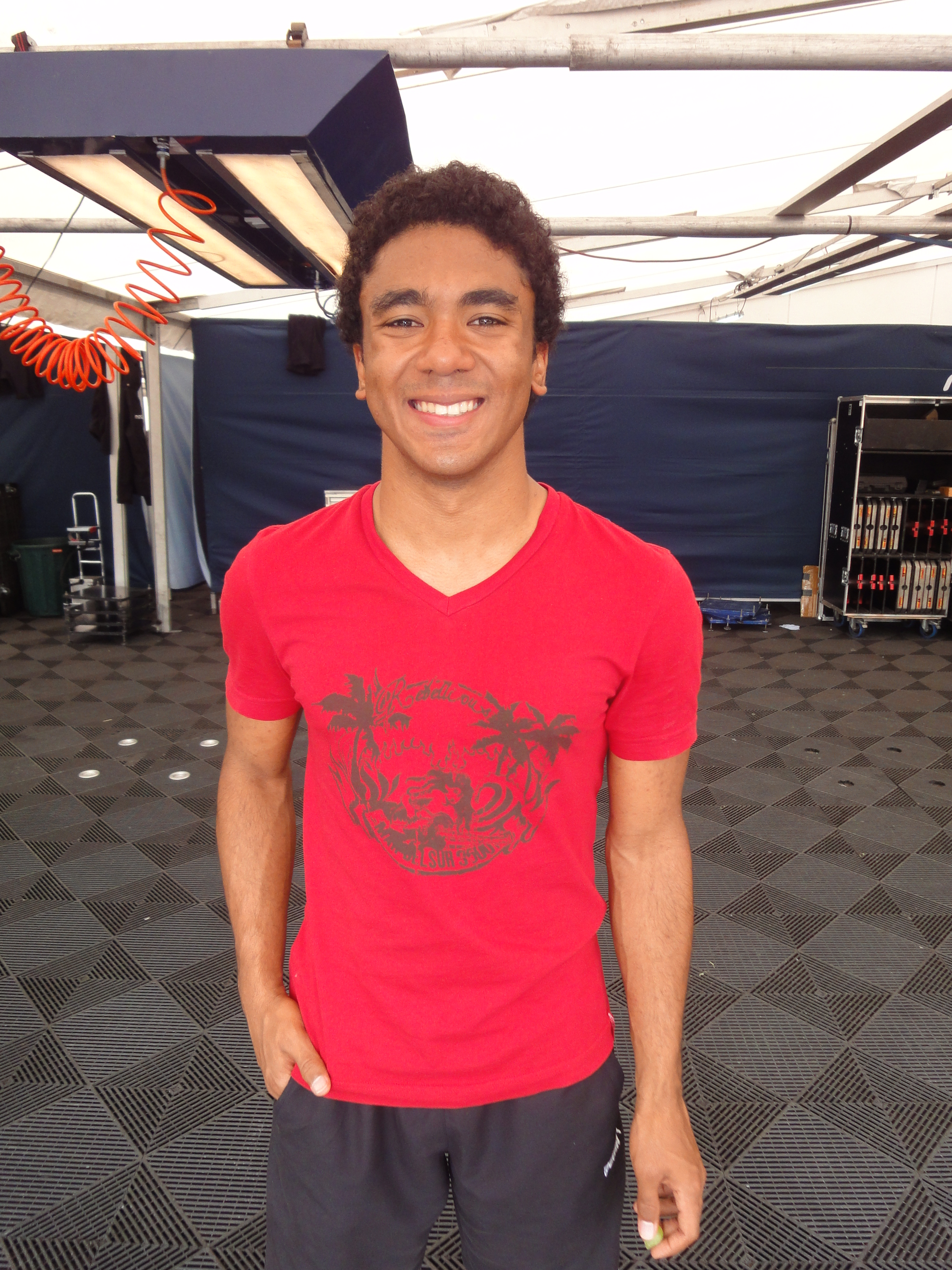
- Sá Silva in 2010
- Nationality: (Angola) Angolan
- Born: Luís Jorge Sá Silva; 23 August 1990 (age 36) Benguela, Angola

GP3 Series career
- Debut season: 2013
- Current team: Carlin
- Car number: 12
- Starts: 34
- Wins: 0
- Poles: 0
- Fastest laps: 0
- Best finish: 19th in 2014

Previous series
- 2012 2012 2012 2011 2010 2010 2009 2007-2008: Formula 3 Euro Series; Macau Grand Prix; British Formula 3 Championship; Formula Pilota China; German Formula 3 Championship; Austria Formula 3 Cup; Formula Renault 2.0 NEC; Asian Formula Renault Challenge

Luís Jorge Sá Silva (born 23 August 1990 in Benguela) is an Angolan former racing driver.

== Career ==
=== Asian Formula Renault ===
Sá Silva contested the Asian Formula Renault Challenge series from 2007 until 2009. During the 2009 season, he won six races and started from pole four times, ultimately finishing in second place overall.

=== Formula Pilota China ===
After a short spell contesting Formula Three championships in Europe throughout 2010, Sá Silva returned to Asia for the Formula Pilota China series in 2011. Sá Silva recorded two wins and three podiums to finish second overall, some sixty-five points behind series winner Mathéo Tuscher.

=== Formula 3 ===
In 2012, Sá Silva returned to Europe to begin a widespread Formula Three campaign that included the Formula 3 Euro Series, the Macau Grand Prix and Masters of Formula 3, and guest appearances in the British Formula 3 Championship. Driving a Dallara chassis powered by a Mercedes-Benz engine that was prepared by the Prema Powerteam, Sá Silva endured a difficult season, in which he scored just fourteen points in the Euro Series, with a best result of seventh place at the Nürburgring.

At the Masters of Formula 3 in July, Sá Silva qualified eighteenth, and went on to finish the race in the same position, four laps behind race winner Daniel Juncadella. His appearance at the Macau Grand Prix was equally difficult; after qualifying twenty-seventh out of thirty drivers, he went on to finish the Qualifying Race in twenty-third position, and was involved in a collision with Dennis van de Laar on the final lap of the Main Race. As he had completed 90% of the race winner's distance at the time of the collision, Sá Silva was considered to have completed the race, and was classified in twenty-third place.

As a guest driver in the British Formula 3 championship, Sá Silva was ineligible to score championship points when he raced at the Norisring and Spa-Francorchamps. However, his results—with a best place of fifteenth in the first race at the Norisring—would not have seen him score points had he been eligible to record them.

=== GP3 Series (2013/2014) ===
Sá Silva competed at the GP3 Series with Carlin in 2013 and 2014. In 2013, he finished the season in 23rd, with three 12th-place finishes as his best results. In 2014, he finished nineteenth, scoring points in two races.

== Racing record ==
=== Career summary ===
Season	Series	Team	Races	Wins	Poles	F/Laps	Podiums	Points	Position
2007	Asian Formula Renault Challenge	Champ Motorsports	12	0	0	0	1	64	14th
2008	Asian Formula Renault Challenge	Champ Motorsports	13	0	0	0	3	193	4th
2009	Asian Formula Renault Challenge	Asia Racing Team	12	6	2	4	7	287	**2nd**
2009	Formula Renault 2.0 NEC	Krenek Motorsport	14	0	0	0	0	44	21st
2010	ATS Formel 3 Cup	China Sonangol	5	0	0	0	0	0	19th
2010	Austria Formula 3 Cup	Sonangol Motopark	4	1	2	3	2	35	9th
2011	Formula Pilota China	Asia Racing Team	12	2	0	0	3	124	**2nd**
2012	Formula 3 Euro Series	Angola Racing Team	21	0	0	0	0	14	14th
2012	British Formula 3 International Series	Angola Racing Team	5	0	0	0	0	0	NC†
2012	Macau Grand Prix	Angola Racing Team	2	0	0	0	0	N/A	23rd
2012	Masters of Formula 3	Angola Racing Team	1	0	0	0	0	N/A	18th
2013	GP3 Series	Carlin	16	0	0	0	0	0	23rd
2014	GP3 Series	Carlin	18	0	0	0	0	6	19th
2014	Auto GP	Zele Racing	2	0	0	0	1	21	16th
2015	Auto GP	Zele Racing	4	1	0	0	2	53	**3rd**
2016	Auto GP Formula Open	Zele Racing	2	0	0	1	1	29	6th

† As Sá Silva was a guest driver, he was ineligible to score points.

=== Complete Asian Formula Renault Challenge results ===
(key) (Races in bold indicate pole position) (Races in italics indicate fastest lap)

Year	Entrant	1	2	3	4	5	6	7	8	9	10	11	12	13	14	DC	Points
2007	Champ Motorsport	ZHU; 1 Ret	ZHU; 2; 16	SEP; 1 Ret	SEP; 2; 21	BEI; 1; 13	BEI; 2 Ret	SHA; 1; 6	SHA; 2; 6	ZHU; 1; 12	ZHU; 2; 17	BEI; 1	BEI; 2	SHA; 1; 3	SHA; 2; 7	14th	64
2008	Champ Motorsport	ZHU; 1 DNS	ZHU; 2; 6	SHA; 1; 16	SHA; 2; 8	SHA; 1; 2	SHA; 2; 4	SEP; 1 DSQ	SEP; 2; 7	ZHU; 1; 4	ZHU; 2; 4	ZHU; 1; 5	ZHU; 2; 4	ZHU; 1; 2	ZHU; 2; 2	4th	193
2009	Asia Racing Team	SHA; 1; 4	SHA; 2; 4	BEI; 1; 4	BEI; 2; 4	**SHA**; **1**; 1	SHA; 2; 1	**CHE**; **1**; 1	CHE; 2; 1	ZHU; 1; 2	ZHU; 2; 1	ZHU; 1; 5	ZHU; 2; 1			2nd	287

=== Complete Formula Renault 2.0 NEC results ===
(key) (Races in bold indicate pole position) (Races in italics indicate fastest lap)

Year	Entrant	1	2	3	4	5	6	7	8	9	10	11	12	13	14	15	16	DC	Points
2009	Krenek Motorsport	ZAN; 1; 17	ZAN; 2 Ret	HOC; 1; 18	HOC; 2; 14	ALA; 1 Ret	ALA; 2; 16	OSC; 1 Ret	OSC; 2; 18	ASS; 1; 15	ASS; 2 Ret	MST; 1 Ret	MST; 2 Ret	NÜR; 1; 16	NÜR; 2; 10	SPA; 1	SPA; 2	21st	44

=== Complete ATS Formel 3 Cup results ===
(key) (Races in bold indicate pole position) (Races in italics indicate fastest lap)

Year	Entrant	Chassis	Engine	1	2	3	4	5	6	7	8	9	10	11	12	13	14	15	16	17	18	D.C.	Points
2010	China Sonangol	Dallara F305	Volkswagen	OSC1; 1; 12	OSC1; 2 Ret	SAC; 1; 14	SAC; 2; 19	HOC; 1 DNS	HOC; 2; 9	ASS1; 1	ASS1; 2	NÜR1; 1	NÜR1; 2	ASS2; 1	ASS2; 2	LAU; 1	LAU; 2	NÜR2; 1	NÜR2; 2	OSC2; 1	OSC2; 2	19th	0

=== Complete Formula Pilota China results ===
(key) (Races in bold indicate pole position) (Races in italics indicate fastest lap)

Year	Entrant	1	2	3	4	5	6	7	8	9	10	11	12	DC	Points
2011	Asia Racing Team	GUA; 1; 3	GUA; 2; 4	SHA; 1; 1	SHA; 2; 4	SHA; 1; 2	SHA; 2; 7	ORD; 1; 1	ORD; 2; 2	SHT; 1; 9	SHT; 2 Ret	SEP; 1; 6	SEP; 2; 5	2nd	124

=== Complete Formula 3 Euro Series results ===
(key) (Races in bold indicate pole position) (Races in italics indicate fastest lap)

Year	Entrant	Chassis	Engine	1	2	3	4	5	6	7	8	9	10	11	12	13	14	15	16	17	18	19	20	21	22	23	24	D.C.	Points
2012	Angola Racing Team	Dallara F312	Mercedes-Benz	HOC; 1; 13	HOC; 2; 14	HOC; 3; 13	BRH; 1 DNS	BRH; 2 DNS	BRH; 3 DNS	RBR; 1; 12	RBR; 2; 13	RBR; 3 Ret	NOR; 1; 15	NOR; 2; 18	NOR; 3; 16	NÜR; 1; 14	NÜR; 2; 12	NÜR; 3; 7	ZAN; 1; 14†	ZAN; 2; 12	ZAN; 3 Ret	VAL; 1; 10	VAL; 2; 11	VAL; 3; 14	HOC; 1 Ret	HOC; 2; 17	HOC; 3; 12	14th	14

=== Complete FIA Formula 3 European Championship results ===
(key) (Races in bold indicate pole position) (Races in italics indicate fastest lap)

Year	Entrant	Chassis	Engine	1	2	3	4	5	6	7	8	9	10	11	12	13	14	15	16	17	18	19	20	D.C.	Points
2012	Angola Racing Team	Dallara F312	Mercedes-Benz	HOC; 1; 13	HOC; 2; 13	PAU; 1	PAU; 2	BRH; 1 DNS	BRH; 2 DNS	RBR; 1; 12	RBR; 2 Ret	NOR; 1; 15	NOR; 2; 16	SPA; 1; 26	SPA; 2; 20	NÜR; 1; 14	NÜR; 2; 7	ZAN; 1; 14	ZAN; 2 Ret	VAL; 1; 10	VAL; 2; 14	HOC; 1 Ret	HOC; 2; 12	13th	7

=== Complete British Formula Three Championship results ===
(key) (Races in bold indicate pole position) (Races in italics indicate fastest lap)

Year	Entrant	Chassis	Engine	1	2	3	4	5	6	7	8	9	10	11	12	13	14	15	16	17	18	19	20	21	22	23	24	25	26	27	28	29	D.C.	Points
2012	Angola Racing Team	Dallara F312	Mercedes-Benz	OUL; 1	OUL; 2	OUL; 3	MNZ; 1	MNZ; 2	MNZ; 3	PAU; 1	PAU; 2	ROC; 1	ROC; 2	ROC; 3	BRH; 1	BRH; 2	BRH; 3	NOR; 1; 15	NOR; 2; 18	NOR; 3; 16	SPA; 1; 26	SPA; 2 C	SPA; 3; 20	SNE; 1	SNE; 2	SNE; 3	SIL; 1	SIL; 2	SIL; 3	DON; 1	DON; 2	DON; 3	NC	0

=== Complete GP3 Series results ===
(key) (Races in bold indicate pole position) (Races in italics indicate fastest lap)

Year	Entrant	1	2	3	4	5	6	7	8	9	10	11	12	13	14	15	16	17	18	D.C.	Points
2013	Carlin	CAT; FEA; 13	CAT; SPR; 12	VAL; FEA; Ret	VAL; SPR; 22	SIL; FEA; 17	SIL; SPR; 12	NÜR; FEA; Ret	NÜR; SPR; 22	HUN; FEA; Ret	HUN; SPR; 22	SPA; FEA; 12	SPA; SPR; 21†	MNZ; FEA; Ret	MNZ; SPR; 19	YMC; FEA; 18	YMC; SPR; 17			23rd	0
2014	Carlin	CAT; FEA; 16	CAT; SPR; 10	RBR; FEA; 8	RBR; SPR; 22	SIL; FEA; 18	SIL; SPR; 9	HOC; FEA; 17	HOC; SPR; 10	HUN; FEA; 17	HUN; SPR; 18	SPA; FEA; 16	SPA; SPR; 23†	MNZ; FEA; 14	MNZ; SPR; 7	SOC; FEA; 17	SOC; SPR; 15	YMC; FEA; Ret	YMC; SPR; 17	19th	6

^{†} Driver did not finish the race, but was classified as he completed over 90% of the race distance.

=== Complete Auto GP results ===
(key) (Races in bold indicate pole position) (Races in italics indicate fastest lap)

Year	Entrant	1	2	3	4	5	6	7	8	9	10	11	12	13	14	15	16	Pos	Points
2014	Zele Racing	MAR; 1	MAR; 2	LEC; 1	LEC; 2	HUN; 1	HUN; 2	MNZ; 1	MNZ; 2	IMO; 1	IMO; 2	RBR; 1	RBR; 2	NÜR; 1	NÜR; 2	EST; 1; 7	EST; 2; 2	16th	21
2015	Zele Racing	HUN; 1; 6	HUN; 2; 4	SIL; 1; 3	SIL; 2; 1													3rd‡	53‡
2016	Zele Racing	ADR; 1; 5†	ADR; 2; 2	MNZ; 1	MNZ; 2	ASS; 1	ASS; 2	BRN; 1	BRN; 2	IMO; 1	IMO; 2							6th	29

^{‡} Position when season was cancelled.
