= Lucas Wolf (racing driver) =

German racing driver (born 1994)

- Nationality: (Germany) German
- Born: 6 September 1994 (age 32) Heidelberg, Germany
- Categorisation: FIA Silver (until 2019); FIA Bronze (2026–)

Lucas Wolf (born 6 September 1994) is a German racing driver. In 2012, he started in the Formula 3 Euro Series.

== Career ==
Wolf was born in Heidelberg. He began his racing career in karting. He remained in karting until 2009. In 2010, he began his formula racing career. For URD Rennsport, he competed in the ADAC Formel Masters. Wolf concluded the season on the eighth position with a third place as his best result. In 2011, he stayed with URD Rennsport in the ADAC Formel Masters. After managing to podium finishes on the penultimate round, he won the last race of the ultimate round. In the end, Wolf once again finished in eighth place in the championship.

In 2012, Wolf switched to the Formula 3 Euro Series, where he stayed with URD Rennsport.

== Racing record ==
=== Racing career summary ===
| Season | Series | Team | Races | Wins | Poles | F/Laps | Podiums | Points | Position |
|---|---|---|---|---|---|---|---|---|---|
| 2010 | ADAC Formel Masters | URD Rennsport | 20 | 0 | 0 | 0 | 1 | 67 | 8th |
| 2011 | ADAC Formel Masters | URD Rennsport | 24 | 1 | 0 | 0 | 3 | 117 | 8th |
| 2012 | Formula 3 Euro Series | URD Rennsport | 24 | 0 | 0 | 0 | 1 | 36 | 11th |
| 2012 | FIA Formula 3 European Championship | URD Rennsport | 18 | 0 | 0 | 0 | 0 | 19 | 11th |
| 2012 | Macau Grand Prix | URD Rennsport | 1 | 0 | 0 | 0 | 0 | N/A | DNF |
| 2013 | FIA Formula 3 European Championship | URD Rennsport | 30 | 0 | 0 | 0 | 1 | 28 | 18th |
| 2014 | Blancpain Sprint Series - Silver | HTP Motorsport | 7 | 1 | 1 | 0 | 6 | 79 | 4th |
| 2014 | Blancpain Endurance Series - Pro | HTP Motorsport | 3 | 0 | 0 | 0 | 0 | 29 | 16th |
| 2026 | International GT Open | Fach Auto Tech | 5 | 0 | 0 | 0 | 0 | 11 | 27th |
| 2026 | International GT Open - Pro-Am | Fach Auto Tech | 2 | 2 | 0 | 1 | 2 | 20 | 13th |
| 2026 | International GT Open - Am | Fach Auto Tech | 3 | 2 | 1 | 1 | 3 | 36 | 10th |
| 2026 | GT World Challenge Europe Endurance Cup - Bronze | Ziggo Sport – Tempesta Racing | 1 | 0 | 0 | 0 | 0 | 0 | NC |
