= 2012 FIA Formula 3 European Championship =

The 2012 FIA Formula 3 European Championship was the first edition of the FIA Formula 3 European Championship. It began at Hockenheim on 28 April, and finished on 21 October at the same venue after ten meetings, held jointly with the Formula 3 Euro Series and the British Formula Three Championship.

== Prize tests ==
The top drivers in the final championship standings will be rewarded with a wide range of prize tests in various other racing categories. The top three drivers will receive a two-day test in a Formula Two car. As well as that, the champion will receive a Formula One test with Scuderia Ferrari, and the runner-up will receive a Deutsche Tourenwagen Masters test.

== Drivers and teams ==
- Numbers used at Euro Series events listed; numbers used at races run to British Formula Three Championship regulations displayed in tooltips.

Team	Chassis (Note: All drivers competed in Dallara chassis; model listed.)	Engine	No.	Driver	Rounds
(Italy) Prema Powerteam	F312/005	Mercedes-Benz	1	(Spain) Daniel Juncadella	All
(Italy) Prema Powerteam	F312/014	Mercedes-Benz	2	(Germany) Sven Müller	All
(Italy) Prema Powerteam	F312/015	Mercedes-Benz	14	(United States) Michael Lewis	All
(Italy) Prema Powerteam	F312/030	Mercedes-Benz	15	(Italy) Raffaele Marciello	All
(Germany) Mücke Motorsport	F312/020	Mercedes-Benz	5	(Sweden) Felix Rosenqvist	All
(Germany) Mücke Motorsport	F312/023	Mercedes-Benz	6	(Germany) Pascal Wehrlein	All
(Switzerland) Jo Zeller Racing	F312/044	Mercedes-Benz	8	(Italy) Andrea Roda	All
(Germany) URD Rennsport	F312/011	Mercedes-Benz	9	(Germany) Lucas Wolf	1, 3–10
(Germany) GU-Racing	F312/019	Mercedes-Benz	10	(United Kingdom) Philip Ellis	1, 4–5
(United Kingdom) Carlin	F312/040	Volkswagen	11	(United Kingdom) William Buller	1, 3–5, 7–10
(United Kingdom) Carlin	F312/004	Volkswagen	12	(Spain) Carlos Sainz Jr.	All
(Germany) ma-con Motorsport	F312/045	Volkswagen	16	(United Kingdom) Tom Blomqvist	All
(Germany) ma-con Motorsport	F312/046	Volkswagen	17	(United Kingdom) Emil Bernstorff	All
(Portugal) Angola Racing Team	F312/039	Mercedes-Benz	23	(Angola) Luís Sá Silva	1, 3–10
Entries ineligible for championship points
(Switzerland) Jo Zeller Racing	F308/044	Mercedes-Benz	7	(Switzerland) Sandro Zeller	All
(United Kingdom) Carlin	F312/010	Volkswagen	30	(United Kingdom) Harry Tincknell	2–3, 5–6
(United Kingdom) Carlin	F312/002	Volkswagen	34	(Malaysia) Jazeman Jaafar	2–7
(United Kingdom) Carlin	F312/001	Volkswagen	39	(United Kingdom) Jack Harvey	2, 5–6
(United Kingdom) Carlin	F312/016	Volkswagen	40	(Brazil) Pietro Fantin	2, 5–6
(United Kingdom) Carlin	F312/016	Volkswagen	44	(Brazil) Felipe Nasr	10
(United Kingdom) Carlin	F312/040	Volkswagen	71	(United Kingdom) Richard Bradley	6
(United Kingdom) Fortec Motorsports	F312/002	Mercedes-Benz	31	(Netherlands) Hannes van Asseldonk	1–2, 5–6
(United Kingdom) Fortec Motorsports	F312/007	Mercedes-Benz	32	(Puerto Rico) Félix Serrallés	1–2, 5–6, 10
(United Kingdom) Fortec Motorsports	F312/036	Mercedes-Benz	33	(United Kingdom) Alex Lynn	1–2, 5–6, 10
(United Kingdom) Fortec Motorsports	F312/0003	Mercedes-Benz	38	(Brazil) Pipo Derani	2, 5–6, 10
(Finland) Double R Racing	F312/043	Mercedes-Benz	35	(Australia) Geoff Uhrhane	2–3, 5–6
(Finland) Double R Racing	F312/009	Mercedes-Benz	36	(Malaysia) Fahmi Ilyas	2–3, 5–6
(Finland) Double R Racing	F308/054	Mugen-Honda	37	(Australia) Duvashen Padayachee	2, 5–6
(Finland) ThreeBond with T-Sport	F312/008	ThreeBond Nissan	41	(Australia) Nick McBride	2, 5–6
(Finland) ThreeBond with T-Sport	F308/025	Mugen-Honda	42	(Australia) Spike Goddard	2, 5–7
(Finland) ThreeBond with T-Sport	F312/008	ThreeBond Nissan	43	(United Kingdom) Alexander Sims	7
(Finland) ThreeBond with T-Sport	F311	Mugen-Honda	44	(Bolivia) Pedro Pablo Calbimonte	6
(United Kingdom) CF Racing	F311	Mugen-Honda	43	(Hong Kong) Adderly Fong	6
(Netherlands) Van Amersfoort Racing	F312/051	Volkswagen	50	(Austria) Lucas Auer	10
(Netherlands) Van Amersfoort Racing	F312/052	Volkswagen	51	(Netherlands) Dennis van de Laar	10

== Race calendar and results ==
A ten-round calendar was announced on 15 March 2012; made up of seven rounds at Formula 3 Euro Series events, two British Formula 3 events at Pau and Spa-Francorchamps, with the Norisring round being run as a championship round in both series.

Round		Circuit	Date	Pole position	Fastest lap	Winning driver	Winning team
1	R1	(Germany) Hockenheimring	28 April	(Spain) Carlos Sainz Jr.	(Spain) Daniel Juncadella	(Spain) Daniel Juncadella	(Italy) Prema Powerteam
1	R2	(Germany) Hockenheimring	29 April	(Spain) Carlos Sainz Jr.	(Spain) Carlos Sainz Jr.	(Spain) Daniel Juncadella	(Italy) Prema Powerteam
2	R1	(France) Pau Circuit	12 May	(Italy) Raffaele Marciello	(Italy) Raffaele Marciello	(Italy) Raffaele Marciello	(Italy) Prema Powerteam
2	R2	(France) Pau Circuit	13 May	(Italy) Raffaele Marciello	(Italy) Raffaele Marciello	(Italy) Raffaele Marciello	(Italy) Prema Powerteam
3	R1	(United Kingdom) Brands Hatch	19 May	(Spain) Daniel Juncadella	(Italy) Raffaele Marciello	(Italy) Raffaele Marciello	(Italy) Prema Powerteam
3	R2	(United Kingdom) Brands Hatch	20 May	(Spain) Daniel Juncadella	(Italy) Raffaele Marciello	(Italy) Raffaele Marciello	(Italy) Prema Powerteam
4	R1	(Austria) Red Bull Ring, Spielberg	2 June	(United Kingdom) William Buller	(Italy) Raffaele Marciello	(Italy) Raffaele Marciello	(Italy) Prema Powerteam
4	R2	(Austria) Red Bull Ring, Spielberg	3 June	(Sweden) Felix Rosenqvist	(Spain) Daniel Juncadella	(Spain) Daniel Juncadella	(Italy) Prema Powerteam
5	R1	(Germany) Norisring	30 June	(Italy) Raffaele Marciello	(Italy) Raffaele Marciello	No winner (Note: Daniel Juncadella was disqualified from the first Norisring race after collisions with Pascal Wehrlein and Raffaele Marciello. The officials chose not to recognise any driver as having finished in first place.)	
5	R2	(Germany) Norisring	1 July	(Germany) Pascal Wehrlein	(Netherlands) Hannes van Asseldonk	(Italy) Raffaele Marciello	(Italy) Prema Powerteam
6	R1	(Belgium) Circuit de Spa-Francorchamps	27 July	(Puerto Rico) Félix Serrallés	(Puerto Rico) Félix Serrallés	(Puerto Rico) Félix Serrallés	(United Kingdom) Fortec Motorsports
6	R2	(Belgium) Circuit de Spa-Francorchamps	28 July	(Puerto Rico) Félix Serrallés	(Spain) Carlos Sainz Jr.	(Spain) Carlos Sainz Jr.	(United Kingdom) Carlin
7	R1	(Germany) Nürburgring	18 August	(Spain) Daniel Juncadella	(Spain) Daniel Juncadella	(Spain) Daniel Juncadella	(Italy) Prema Powerteam
7	R2	(Germany) Nürburgring	19 August	(Spain) Daniel Juncadella	(United Kingdom) Alexander Sims	(Germany) Pascal Wehrlein	(Germany) Mücke Motorsport
8	R1	(Netherlands) Circuit Park Zandvoort	25 August	(Germany) Sven Müller	(Sweden) Felix Rosenqvist	(Sweden) Felix Rosenqvist	(Germany) Mücke Motorsport
8	R2	(Netherlands) Circuit Park Zandvoort	26 August	(Germany) Sven Müller	(Spain) Daniel Juncadella	(Spain) Daniel Juncadella	(Italy) Prema Powerteam
9	R1	(Spain) Circuit Ricardo Tormo, Valencia	29 September	(Italy) Raffaele Marciello	(Spain) Daniel Juncadella	(Italy) Raffaele Marciello	(Italy) Prema Powerteam
9	R2	(Spain) Circuit Ricardo Tormo, Valencia	30 September	(Spain) Daniel Juncadella	(Sweden) Felix Rosenqvist	(Sweden) Felix Rosenqvist	(Germany) Mücke Motorsport
10	R1	(Germany) Hockenheimring	20 October	(Sweden) Felix Rosenqvist	(Sweden) Felix Rosenqvist	(Sweden) Felix Rosenqvist	(Germany) Mücke Motorsport
10	R2	(Germany) Hockenheimring	21 October	(Sweden) Felix Rosenqvist	(Germany) Pascal Wehrlein	(Sweden) Felix Rosenqvist	(Germany) Mücke Motorsport

== Championship standings ==
The second race at the Norisring was red-flagged after half the race had been completed due to torrential rain. As a result, series organisers only awarded half points to each of the classified finishers eligible to score points.

Pos	Driver	HOC (Germany)		PAU (France)		BRH (United Kingdom)		RBR (Austria)		NOR (Germany)		SPA (Belgium)		NÜR (Germany)		ZAN (Netherlands)		VAL (Spain)		HOC (Germany)		Pts
Pos	Driver	R1	R2	R1	R2	R1	R2	R1	R2	R1	R2	R1	R2	R1	R2	R1	R2	R1	R2	R1	R2	Pts
1	(Spain) Daniel Juncadella	1	1	Ret	4	**2**	**8**	7	1	DSQ	2	2	8	**1**	**DSQ**	6	1	2	**2**	13	4	252
2	(Italy) Raffaele Marciello	6	17	**1**	**1**	1	1	1	8	**22** (Note: Drivers did not finish the race, but were classified as they completed over 90% of the race distance.)	1	11	14	6	Ret	4	Ret	**1**	3	3	8	228.5
3	(Sweden) Felix Rosenqvist	3	3	4	6	7	Ret	9	**11**	6	14	9	Ret	4	Ret	1	4	13	1	**1**	**1**	192
4	(Germany) Pascal Wehrlein	Ret	8	Ret	9	5	5	2	4	7	**Ret**	14	12	3	1	7	3	5	4	2	2	181
5	(Spain) Carlos Sainz Jr.	**2**	**2**	6	2	4	4	16	5	Ret	19	3	1	7	10	11	5	Ret	6	Ret	11	161
6	(United Kingdom) William Buller	4	6			15	2	**8**	2	2	18			10	2	8	2	6	9	6	Ret	137
7	(United Kingdom) Tom Blomqvist	7	11	13	21	10	7	5	7	10	7	10	2	9	5	5	Ret	3	5	4	7	117
8	(Germany) Sven Müller	15	5	12	10	6	10	4	3	9	11	12	Ret	2	Ret	**2**	**Ret**	7	13	5	6	109
9	(United States) Michael Lewis	9	Ret	10	11	3	3	6	6	Ret	8	7	5	15	6	3	Ret	8	8	9	10	101
10	(United Kingdom) Emil Bernstorff	11	12	Ret	13	11	9	11	14	3	4	17	10	11	4	9	6	4	7	11	9	66
11	(Germany) Lucas Wolf	8	15			Ret	13	13	12	Ret	22	20	13	12	8	10	7	11	12	8	15	19
12	(Italy) Andrea Roda	Ret	14	19	Ret	14	11	10	Ret	16	13	19	16	13	Ret	13	8	9	10	12	13	8
13	(Angola) Luís Sá Silva	13	13			DNS	DNS	12	Ret	15	16	26	20	14	7	14	Ret	10	14	Ret	12	7
14	(United Kingdom) Philip Ellis	14	16					14	13	Ret	Ret											0
Drivers ineligible for points.
	(Puerto Rico) Félix Serrallés	Ret	9	8	19					5	3	**1**	**3**							16	5	0
	(Malaysia) Jazeman Jaafar			2	3	8	Ret	3	10	18	Ret	5	4	5	3							0
	(United Kingdom) Alex Lynn	10	4	3	7					19	9	6	5							Ret	3	0
	(United Kingdom) Jack Harvey			5	8					14	Ret	4	6									0
	(Brazil) Pietro Fantin			14	12					4	6	16	19									0
	(Netherlands) Hannes van Asseldonk	5	7	11	Ret					20	5	23	18									0
	(Brazil) Pipo Derani			Ret	5					Ret	21	8	7							10	Ret	0
	(United Kingdom) Harry Tincknell			7	Ret	Ret	6			8	10	13	9									0
	(Austria) Lucas Auer																			7	Ret	0
	(United Kingdom) Alexander Sims													8	12							0
	(Switzerland) Sandro Zeller	12	10	18	16	13	14	15	9	11	23	22	25	16	9	12	9	13	11	15	14	0
	(Malaysia) Fahmi Ilyas			9	15	9	15			Ret	12	21	21									0
	(Australia) Spike Goddard			17	20					17	17	28	24	17	11							0
	(Australia) Geoff Uhrhane			16	18	12	12			12	Ret	15	Ret									0
	(Australia) Nick McBride			15	14					13	15	18	15									0
	(Netherlands) Dennis van de Laar																			14	16	0
	(Australia) Duvashen Padayachee			DNS	17					21	20	25	24									0
	(China) Adderly Fong											27	17									0
	(United Kingdom) Richard Bradley											21	Ret									0
	(Bolivia) Pedro Pablo Calbimonte											29	22									0
	(Brazil) Felipe Nasr																			Ret	DNS	0
Pos	Driver	R1	R2	R1	R2	R1	R2	R1	R2	R1	R2	R1	R2	R1	R2	R1	R2	R1	R2	R1	R2	Pts
Pos	Driver	HOC (Germany)		PAU (France)		BRH (United Kingdom)		RBR (Austria)		NOR (Germany)		SPA (Belgium)		NÜR (Germany)		ZAN (Netherlands)		VAL (Spain)		HOC (Germany)		Pts

Colour	Result
Gold	Winner
Silver	Second place
Bronze	Third place
Green	Points classification
Blue	Non-points classification
Blue	Non-classified finish (NC)
Purple	Retired, not classified (Ret)
Red	Did not qualify (DNQ)
Red	Did not pre-qualify (DNPQ)
Black	Disqualified (DSQ)
White	Did not start (DNS)
White	Withdrew (WD)
White	Race cancelled (C)
Blank	Did not practice (DNP)
Blank	Did not arrive (DNA)
Blank	Excluded (EX)

- **Bold** – Pole
- Italics – Fastest Lap
