= 2013 Formula Masters China =

Seasons
- ← 2012 2014 →

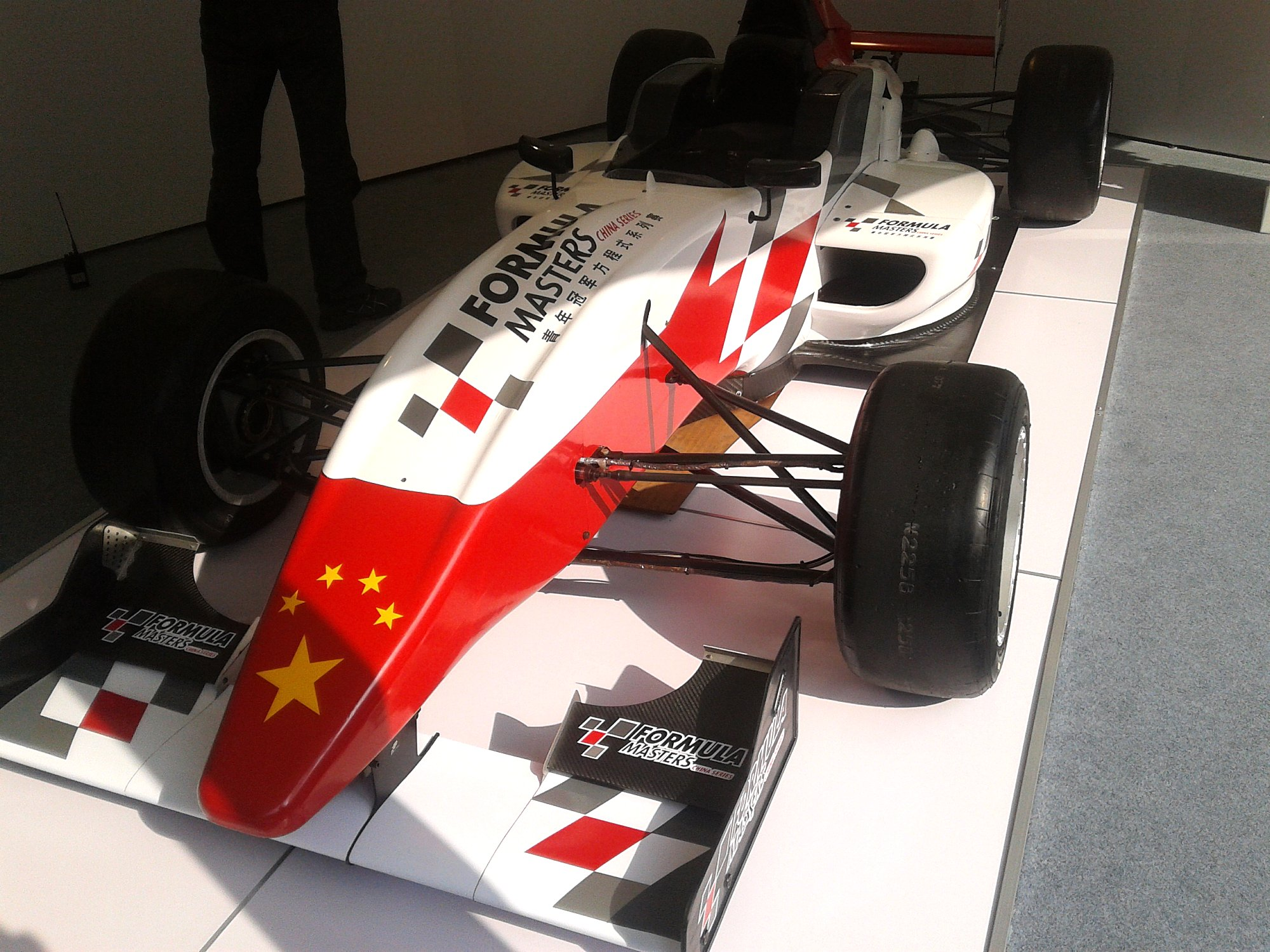
2013 Formula Masters China race car by Tatuus.

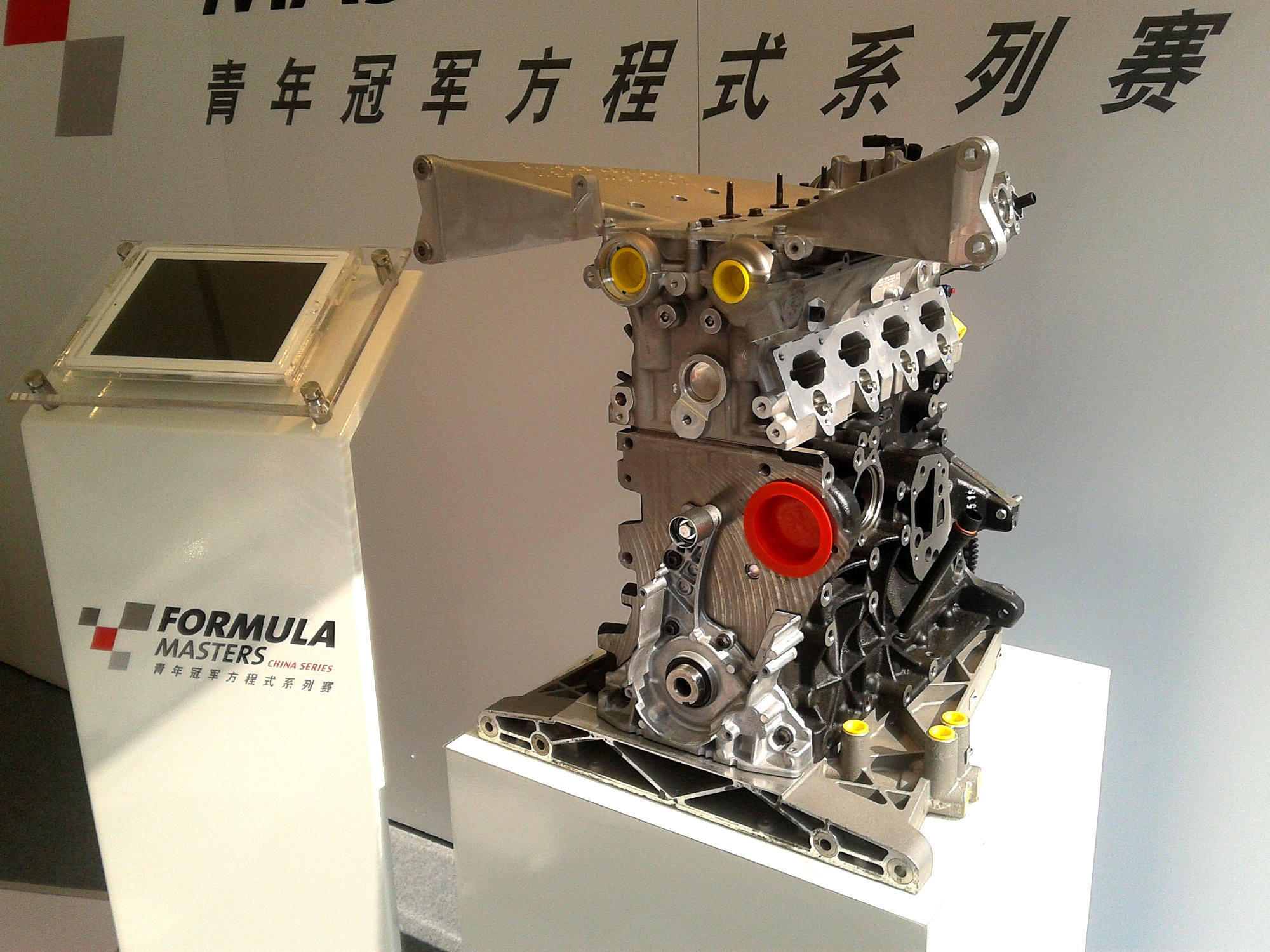
2013 Formula Masters China's VW engine

The 2013 Formula Masters China season is the third season of the Formula Pilota China series, and the first under the Formula Masters China branding. It was also the first season with one-make Volkswagen 2.0 engines. The championship began on 10 May at Zhuhai and will finish on 10 November at Guia Circuit in Macau after nineteen races held at seven meetings.

== Teams and drivers ==
- All cars are Volkswagen-engined Tatuus FA010 chassis.

| Team | No | Driver | Rounds |
|---|---|---|---|
| (Malaysia) Meritus.GP | 3 | (Indonesia) Andersen Martono | 4–5 |
| (Malaysia) Meritus.GP | 38 | (Australia) Aidan Wright | All, NC |
| (Malaysia) Meritus.GP | 88 | (Malaysia) Afiq Yazid | All |
| (Malaysia) Meritus.GP | 95 | (China) Yang Fan | NC |
| (China) Lin Li Feng | 5 | (China) Lin Li Feng | 1–2 |
| (Hong Kong) Cebu Pacific Air by KCMG | 7 | (Hong Kong) Ronald Wu | 1–4 |
| (Hong Kong) Cebu Pacific Air by KCMG | 9 | (Switzerland) Thomas Lüdi | 6, NC |
| (Hong Kong) Cebu Pacific Air by KCMG | 16 | (United Kingdom) Dan Wells | 6, NC |
| (Hong Kong) Cebu Pacific Air by KCMG | 29 | (Malaysia) Akash Nandy | All, NC |
| (Hong Kong) Cebu Pacific Air by KCMG | 78 | (India) Mahaveer Raghunathan | 6 |
| (China) Star Racing Team | 8 | (China) Yuan Bo | All, NC |
| (China) Star Racing Team | 15 | (China) Bao Jin Long | All, NC |
| (China) Star Racing Team | 23 | (China) Zou Si Rui | All |
| (China) Star Racing Team | 75 | (China) Zou Chen Yu | All |
| (India) Meco Motorsports | 10 | (India) Raj Bharath | All |
| (Japan) Super License Team | 11 | (Japan) Ren Nagabuchi | All, NC |
| (Japan) Super License Team | 12 | (China) Yin Hai Tao | All, NC |
| (Japan) Super License Team | 28 | (Hong Kong) William Lok | NC |
| (Japan) Super License Team | 55 | (China) Wu Zhou | 2–3 |
| (Philippines) Eurasia Motorsport | 17 | (China) Pu Jun Jin | All, NC |
| (Philippines) Eurasia Motorsport | 18 | (Thailand) Tanart Sathienthirakul | 3–6, NC |
| (Philippines) Eurasia Motorsport | 19 | (Hong Kong) Matthew Solomon | All, NC |
| (Philippines) Eurasia Motorsport | 20 | (Macau) Wing Chung Chang | 6, NC |
| (Philippines) Eurasia Motorsport | 21 | (Hong Kong) Shaun Thong | NC |
| (Philippines) Eurasia Motorsport | 21 | (Italy) Andrea Reggiani | 4 |
| (Italy) Andrea Reggiani | 21 | (Italy) Andrea Reggiani | 2–3 |
| (Macau) Gold Wolf Racing | 37 | (Japan) Yudai Jinkawa | NC |
| (China) Zhang Zhen Dong | 98 | (China) Zhendong Zhang | 1 |

== Race calendar and results ==
| Round | | Circuit | Date | Pole position | Fastest lap | Winning driver | Winning team |
|---|---|---|---|---|---|---|---|
| 1 | R1 | (China) Zhuhai International Circuit | 11 May | (India) Raj Bharath | (Australia) Aidan Wright | (Malaysia) Afiq Yazid | (Malaysia) Meritus.GP |
| 1 | R2 | (China) Zhuhai International Circuit | 11 May | | (Malaysia) Akash Nandy | (Australia) Aidan Wright | (Malaysia) Meritus.GP |
| 1 | R3 | (China) Zhuhai International Circuit | 12 May | (Malaysia) Afiq Yazid | (Hong Kong) Matthew Solomon | (Australia) Aidan Wright | (Malaysia) Meritus.GP |
| 2 | R1 | (China) Shanghai International Circuit | 25 May | (Malaysia) Afiq Yazid | (Australia) Aidan Wright | (Malaysia) Afiq Yazid | (Malaysia) Meritus.GP |
| 2 | R2 | (China) Shanghai International Circuit | 25 May | | (Malaysia) Afiq Yazid | (Malaysia) Afiq Yazid | (Malaysia) Meritus.GP |
| 2 | R3 | (China) Shanghai International Circuit | 26 May | (Malaysia) Akash Nandy | (Malaysia) Afiq Yazid | (India) Raj Bharath | (India) Meco Motorsport |
| 3 | R1 | (China) Ordos International Circuit | 6 July | (Malaysia) Akash Nandy | (Malaysia) Afiq Yazid | (Malaysia) Afiq Yazid | (Malaysia) Meritus.GP |
| 3 | R2 | (China) Ordos International Circuit | 7 July | | (Malaysia) Afiq Yazid | (Malaysia) Afiq Yazid | (Malaysia) Meritus.GP |
| 3 | R3 | (China) Ordos International Circuit | 7 July | Race postponed | | | |
| 4 | R1 | (South Korea) Inje Speedium | 10 August | (Australia) Aidan Wright | (India) Raj Bharath | (Australia) Aidan Wright | (Malaysia) Meritus.GP |
| 4 | R2 | (South Korea) Inje Speedium | 10 August | (Australia) Aidan Wright | (India) Raj Bharath | (Malaysia) Akash Nandy | (Hong Kong) Cebu Pacific Air by KCMG |
| 4 | R3 | (South Korea) Inje Speedium | 11 August | (Malaysia) Akash Nandy | (Australia) Aidan Wright | (Australia) Aidan Wright | (Malaysia) Meritus.GP |
| 4 | R4 | (South Korea) Inje Speedium | 11 August | (Malaysia) Akash Nandy | (Australia) Aidan Wright | (Australia) Aidan Wright | (Malaysia) Meritus.GP |
| 5 | R1 | (Malaysia) Sepang International Circuit | 14 September | (Thailand) Tanart Sathienthirakul | (Malaysia) Akash Nandy | (Malaysia) Akash Nandy | (Hong Kong) Cebu Pacific Air by KCMG |
| 5 | R2 | (Malaysia) Sepang International Circuit | 14 September | | (Malaysia) Akash Nandy | (Malaysia) Akash Nandy | (Hong Kong) Cebu Pacific Air by KCMG |
| 5 | R3 | (Malaysia) Sepang International Circuit | 15 September | (Thailand) Tanart Sathienthirakul | (Malaysia) Akash Nandy | (Malaysia) Akash Nandy | (Hong Kong) Cebu Pacific Air by KCMG |
| 6 | R1 | (China) Shanghai International Circuit | 26 October | (Thailand) Tanart Sathienthirakul | (Malaysia) Afiq Yazid | (Thailand) Tanart Sathienthirakul | (Philippines) Eurasia Motorsport |
| 6 | R2 | (China) Shanghai International Circuit | 26 October | | (Malaysia) Akash Nandy | (Malaysia) Afiq Yazid | (Malaysia) Meritus.GP |
| 6 | R3 | (China) Shanghai International Circuit | 27 October | (Malaysia) Akash Nandy | (Australia) Aidan Wright | (Australia) Aidan Wright | (Malaysia) Meritus.GP |
| NC | | (Macau) Guia Circuit | 10 November | (Malaysia) Akash Nandy | (Malaysia) Akash Nandy | (Malaysia) Akash Nandy | (Hong Kong) Cebu Pacific Air by KCMG |

== Standings ==
=== Drivers' championship ===
- Points for both championships were awarded as follows:

Race
| Position | 1st | 2nd | 3rd | 4th | 5th | 6th | 7th | 8th | 9th | 10th | PP |
|---|---|---|---|---|---|---|---|---|---|---|---|
| **Race 1&3** | 20 | 15 | 12 | 10 | 8 | 6 | 4 | 3 | 2 | 1 | 1 |
| **Race 2** | 12 | 10 | 8 | 6 | 4 | 3 | 2 | 1 | | | |

| Pos | Driver | ZHU (China) | | | SHI (China) | | | ORD (China) | | INJ (South Korea) | | | | SEP (Malaysia) | | | SHI (China) | | | MAC^{†} (Macau) | Pts |
|---|---|---|---|---|---|---|---|---|---|---|---|---|---|---|---|---|---|---|---|---|---|
| 1 | (Australia) Aidan Wright | Ret | **1** | 1 | 2 | **3** | 4 | 6 | 4 | **1** | **3** | 1 | 1 | 3 | 3 | 4 | 6 | 4 | 1 | 9 | 210 |
| 2 | (Malaysia) Afiq Yazid | 1 | 5 | **Ret** | **1** | 1 | 2 | 1 | **1** | 2 | 13 | 4 | 3 | 2 | 2 | Ret | 2 | **1** | 3 | | 208 |
| 3 | (Malaysia) Akash Nandy | Ret | 2 | 2 | 3 | Ret | **3** | **2** | 5 | 7 | 1 | **2** | **10** | 1 | **1** | 1 | 9 | 6 | **Ret** | **1** | 163 |
| 4 | (Japan) Ren Nagabuchi | 2 | 3 | 4 | 9 | 5 | 5 | 5 | 2 | 4 | Ret | 5 | Ret | 5 | 6 | 2 | 4 | 5 | 6 | 4 | 129 |
| 5 | (Hong Kong) Matthew Solomon | 4 | 4 | 8 | 5 | 4 | 6 | 7 | 7 | 7 | 4 | 3 | 5 | 8 | 4 | 3 | 3 | 3 | 4 | 6 | 128 |
| 6 | (India) Raj Bharath | **3** | 6 | 3 | 4 | 2 | 1 | 3 | 6 | 3 | 12 | Ret | 4 | Ret | 5 | 5 | 12 | 9 | 9 | | 120 |
| 7 | (Thailand) Tanart Sathienthirakul | | | | | | | 4 | 3 | 5 | 2 | 6 | 2 | **4** | Ret | **Ret** | **1** | 2 | 2 | 5 | 115 |
| 8 | (China) Pu Jun Jin | 5 | 7 | Ret | 7 | 6 | 9 | 10 | 9 | 9 | 5 | 7 | 9 | 6 | 11 | 11 | 8 | 8 | 8 | 8 | 45 |
| 9 | (China) Yuan Bo | Ret | Ret | 5 | 6 | 7 | 8 | 8 | 8 | Ret | Ret | 11 | 7 | Ret | 8 | 10 | 13 | 11 | 11 | 10 | 29 |
| 10 | (Hong Kong) Ronald Wu | 6 | 11 | 6 | Ret | 9 | 7 | 11 | 11 | 8 | 6 | 8 | 8 | | | | | | | | 28 |
| 11 | (China) Yin Hai Tao | Ret | 8 | DNS | 11 | 8 | 11 | Ret | 12 | Ret | 7 | 9 | 6 | Ret | 9 | 6 | 7 | 10 | 7 | Ret | 26 |
| 12 | (China) Bao Jin Long | 7 | 9 | 7 | 10 | Ret | 10 | 12 | 10 | 11 | Ret | 10 | Ret | 7 | 7 | 9 | 16 | 13 | 13 | 11 | 18 |
| 13 | (United Kingdom) Dan Wells | | | | | | | | | | | | | | | | 5 | 7 | 5 | 2 | 7 |
| 14 | (China) Zou Si Rui | Ret | Ret | Ret | 8 | Ret | 12 | 9 | Ret | Ret | 8 | Ret | Ret | Ret | Ret | Ret | 10 | 12 | 14 | | 6 |
| 15 | (Indonesia) Andersen Martono | | | | | | | | | Ret | 9 | Ret | | 9 | 10 | 7 | | | | | 4 |
| 16 | (China) Zou Chen Yu | Ret | 13 | Ret | 12 | 12 | 14 | Ret | 13 | Ret | 11 | 12 | 11 | 10 | 12 | 8 | Ret | 14 | 15 | | 2 |
| 17 | (China) Zhendong Zhang | Ret | 10 | 9 | | | | | | | | | | | | | | | | | 1 |
| 18 | (Italy) Andrea Reggiani | | | | 13 | 10 | Ret | 13 | Ret | 10 | 10 | 13 | Ret | | | | | | | | 1 |
| 19 | (China) Lin Li Feng | DNS | 12 | 10 | Ret | 11 | DNS | | | | | | | | | | | | | | 1 |
| 20 | (India) Mahaveer Raghunathan | | | | | | | | | | | | | | | | 14 | 15 | 12 | | 0 |
| 21 | (China) Wu Zhou | | | | Ret | 13 | 13 | Ret | DNS | | | | | | | | | | | | 0 |
| 22 | (Switzerland) Thomas Lüdi | | | | | | | | | | | | | | | | 15 | 16 | Ret | 14 | 0 |
Guest drivers ineligible for points
| | (Hong Kong) Shaun Thong | | | | | | | | | | | | | | | | | | | 3 | 0 |
| | (Macau) Wing Chung Chang | | | | | | | | | | | | | | | | 11 | Ret | 10 | 7 | 0 |
| | (Hong Kong) William Lok | | | | | | | | | | | | | | | | | | | 12 | 0 |
| | (China) Yang Fan | | | | | | | | | | | | | | | | | | | 13 | 0 |
| | (Japan) Yudai Jinkawa | | | | | | | | | | | | | | | | | | | Ret | 0 |
| Pos | Driver | ZHU (China) | | | SHI (China) | | | ORD (China) | | INJ (South Korea) | | | | SEP (Malaysia) | | | SHI (China) | | | MAC (Macau) | Pts |

| Colour | Result |
|---|---|
| Gold | Winner |
| Silver | Second place |
| Bronze | Third place |
| Green | Points classification |
| Blue | Non-points classification |
| Blue | Non-classified finish (NC) |
| Purple | Retired, not classified (Ret) |
| Red | Did not qualify (DNQ) |
| Red | Did not pre-qualify (DNPQ) |
| Black | Disqualified (DSQ) |
| White | Did not start (DNS) |
| White | Withdrew (WD) |
| White | Race cancelled (C) |
| Blank | Did not practice (DNP) |
| Blank | Did not arrive (DNA) |
| Blank | Excluded (EX) |

**Bold** – Pole
Italics – Fastest Lap

Notes:

- † — No points are awarded for the non-championship Macau Grand Prix event.

=== Teams ===
| Pos | Team | Pts |
|---|---|---|
| 1 | (Malaysia) Meritus.GP | 415 |
| 2 | (Philippines) Eurasia Motorsport | 262 |
| 3 | (Hong Kong) Cebu Pacific Air by KCMG | 203 |
| 4 | (Japan) Super License Team | 155 |
| 5 | (India) Meco Motorsports | 121 |
| 6 | (China) Star Racing Team | 57 |
