= Raj Bharath (racing driver) =

Indian professional race car driver

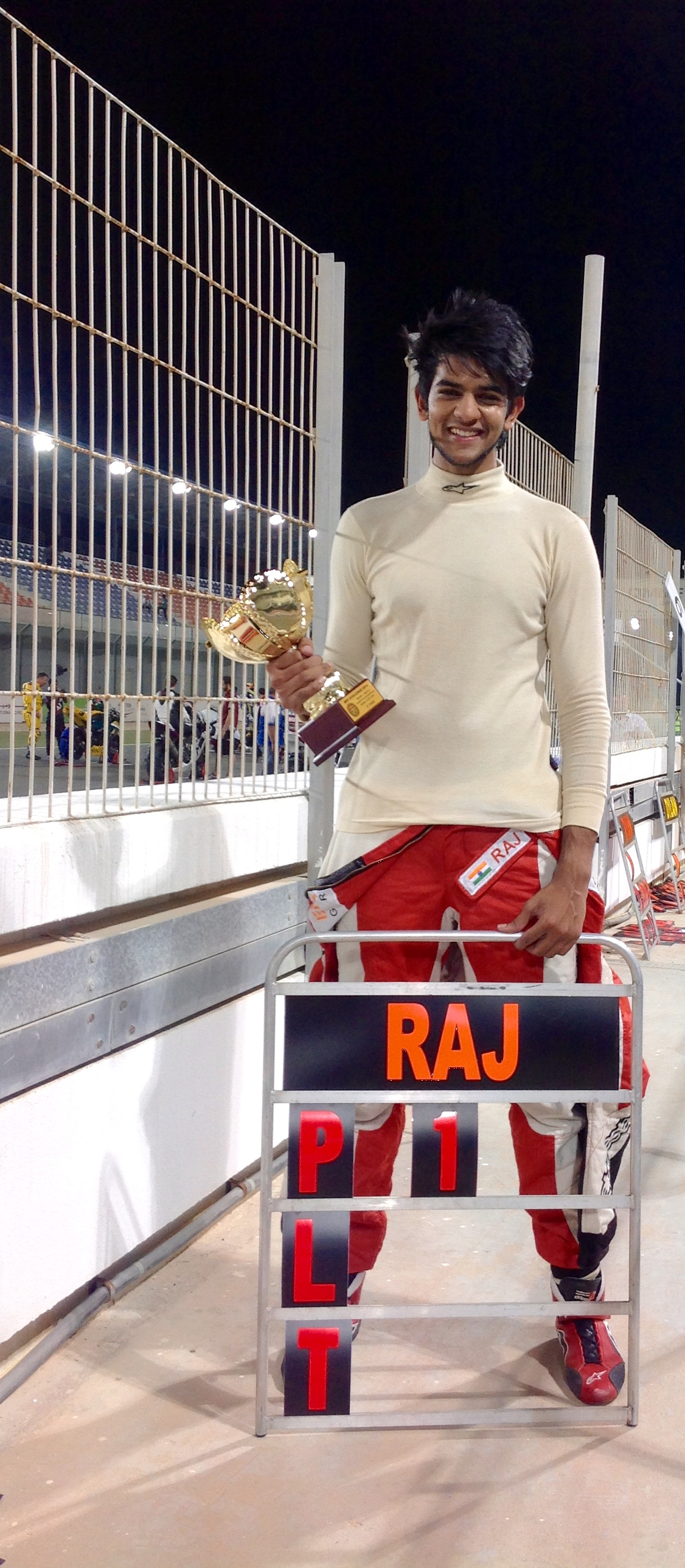
- Nationality: Indian
- Born: 20 November 1994 (age 31)

MRF Challenge career
- Car number: 20
- Former teams: Meco Motorsport
- Starts: 70
- Wins: 6
- Podiums: 12
- Poles: 2
- Fastest laps: 2
- Best finish: 1st in 2013, 2014

Previous series
- 2013 Formula Masters China; 2012 Formula Pilota China; 2011 Formula BMW Asia Pacific

Raj Bharath Swaminathan (born 20 November 1994) is an Indian professional racing driver from Bangalore. He has competed in multiple single-seater and karting championships, and is particularly noted for his performance in the 2014–15 MRF Challenge Formula 2000 series, where he finished third overall.

== Career ==
Raj started his motorsport career with karting in 2008, winning the ‘Most promising rookie of the year’ trophy in his debut year, in the National Karting Championship. After winning the Rotax Max Karting National Champion title in 2010, he progressed to the JK Racing Asia Series in 2011, followed by the Formula Pilota China in 2012 and the Formula Masters China in 2013, where he achieved a single win. He won the Young Star Driver program from Mercedes-Benz India in 2014. In 2012, Bharath became a part of the Aston Martin Racing Driver Academy. In the 2014–15 MRF Challenge Formula 2000 Championship Raj achieved four podiums including one win and finished third overall.

== Racing record ==
=== Career summary ===
Season	Series	Team	Races	Wins	Poles	F/Laps	Podiums	Points	Position
2010	JK Tyre National Racing Championship - Formula Rolon	Meco Racing	2	0	?	?	0	1	12th
2011	JK Racing Asia Series	www.Meritus.GP	18	0	0	0	0	22	13th
2012	JK Racing Asia Series	Atlantic Racing Team	4	0	0	0	0	0	NC†
2012	JK Racing Asia Series	Meco Racing	2	0	0	0	0	0	NC†
2012	Formula Pilota China	Meco Motorsport	18	0	0	0	4	104	6th
2013	Formula Masters China	Meco Motorsports	18	1	1	2	6	120	6th
2013-14	MRF Challenge Formula 2000 Championship	MRF Racing	11	0	0	0	0	10	13th
2014-15	MRF Challenge Formula 2000 Championship	MRF Racing	12	1	1	1	4	148	3rd

† As Bharath was a guest driver, he was ineligible to score points.

=== MRF Challenge Formula 2000 Championship results ===
Year	1	2	3	4	5	6	7	8	9	10	11	12	Pos	Points
2014-15	LOS; 9	LOS; 7	LOS; 1	LOS; 2	BHR; 2	BHR; 4	BHR; 4	BHR; 3	MMR; 5	MMR; 6	MMR; 4	MMR; 7	3rd	148

=== Formula Masters China results ===
Year	1	2	3	4	5	6	7	8	9	10	11	12	13	14	15	16	17	18	Points
2013	CHN; 3	CHN; 6	CHN; 3	CHN; 4	CHN; 2	CHN; 1	CHN; 3	CHN; 6	KOR; 3	KOR; 12	KOR; Ret	KOR; 4	MAL; Ret	MAL; 5	MAL; 5	CHN; 12	CHN; 9	CHN; 9	120

=== Formula Pilota China results ===
Year	1	2	3	4	5	6	7	8	9	10	11	12	13	14	15	16	17	18	Points
2012	CHN; 8	CHN; Ret	CHN; 4	CHN; 5	CHN; 5	CHN; 8	CHN; 4	CHN; 7	CHN; 5	CHN; Ret	CHN; 3	CHN; 6	MAL; 2	MAL; 2	MAL; 6	MAL; 2	MAL; Ret	MAL; Ret	104

=== JK Racing Asia Series results ===
Year	1	2	3	4	5	6	7	8	9	10	11	12	13	14	15	16	17	18	Points
2011	MAL; 16	MAL; 12	MAL; 12	MAL; 9	MAL; 12	MAL; Ret	IDN; 9	IDN; 11	IDN; 8	IDN; Ret	SIN; Ret	SIN; 7	IND; 12	IND; 15	MAL; 11	MAL; 11	MAL; 11	MAL; 10	22
