= 2012 Formula Pilota China =

Seasons
- ← 2011 2013 →

The 2012 Formula Pilota China season was the second season of the Formula Pilota China series and the last to run on regulations based upon Formula Abarth. The championship started on 17 June at Shanghai and finished on 8 December at Sepang after eighteen races held at six meetings.

== Teams and drivers ==
- All cars were FPT-engined Tatuus FA010 chassis.

| Team | No. | Driver | Class | Rounds |
|---|---|---|---|---|
| (Philippines) Eurasia Motorsport | 2 | (India) Parth Ghorpade | AS | All |
| (Philippines) Eurasia Motorsport | 5 | (Belgium) Sami Luka | | 1–2 |
| (Philippines) Eurasia Motorsport | 6 | (Singapore) Sean Hudspeth | AS | 6 |
| (Philippines) Eurasia Motorsport | 7 | (Indonesia) Sean Gelael | AS | All |
| (Philippines) Eurasia Motorsport | 9 | (Indonesia) Robin Tato | AS | 1–2 |
| (Philippines) Eurasia Motorsport | 66 | (China) Bo Yuan | AS | 6 |
| (Philippines) Eurasia Motorsport | 99 | (Italy) Antonio Giovinazzi | | All |
| (Japan) Team UKYO with Super License | 8 | (Japan) Shota Kiyohara | AS | 1, 3 |
| (Japan) Team UKYO with Super License | 11 | (Japan) Ren Nagabuchi | AS | All |
| (Japan) Team UKYO with Super License | 12 | (China) Yin Hai Tao | AS | All |
| (Japan) Team UKYO with Super License | 26 | (United States) David Cheng | AS | 5 |
| (Japan) Team UKYO with Super License | 87 | (China) Sun Zheng | AS | 2, 6 |
| (India) Meco Motorsport | 10 | (India) Raj Bharath | AS | All |
| (Hong Kong) KCMG | 16 | (United Kingdom) Dan Wells | | All |
| (Hong Kong) KCMG | 29 | (Malaysia) Akash Nandy | AS | 2–3, 6 |
| (Hong Kong) KCMG | 39 | (Japan) Yuta Shiraishi | AS | 4 |
| (Hong Kong) PS Racing | 21 | (Italy) Andrea Reggiani | | 2 |
| (Hong Kong) PS Racing | 48 | (Italy) Angelo Negro | | 1 |
| (Hong Kong) PS Racing | 96 | (China) Li Chao | AS | 1, 3 |
| (Macau) Asia Racing Team | 23 | (China) Zou Sirui | AS | 1–4 |
| (Malaysia) Meritus.GP | 78 | (Thailand) Toby Earle | AS | 5 |
| (Malaysia) Meritus.GP | 98 | (Australia) Aidan Wright | | 6 |
| (Malaysia) Mahara | 88 | (Malaysia) Afiq Ikhwan | AS | 1, 5–6 |

| Icon | Class |
|---|---|
| AS | Best Asian Driver Trophy |

== Race calendar and results ==
The series' provisional schedule was released on 3 March 2012. It will consist of six rounds, with three races at each round. The Guangdong and Shanghai Tianma events were dropped, while Zhuhai and the new Penbay International Circuit in Taiwan were included. But later calendar was revised with changing Zhuhai and Penbay to Guandong and second Sepang round.

| Round | | Circuit | Date | Pole position | Fastest lap | Winning driver | Winning team | Asian Trophy |
|---|---|---|---|---|---|---|---|---|
| 1 | R1 | (China) Shanghai International Circuit | 16 June | (Japan) Shota Kiyohara | (Japan) Shota Kiyohara | (Japan) Shota Kiyohara | (Japan) Team UKYO with Super License | (Japan) Shota Kiyohara |
| 1 | R2 | (China) Shanghai International Circuit | 17 June | (Japan) Shota Kiyohara | (Japan) Shota Kiyohara | (Japan) Shota Kiyohara | (Japan) Team UKYO with Super License | (Japan) Shota Kiyohara |
| 1 | R3 | (China) Shanghai International Circuit | 17 June | (Japan) Shota Kiyohara | (Japan) Shota Kiyohara | (Japan) Shota Kiyohara | (Japan) Team UKYO with Super License | (Japan) Shota Kiyohara |
| 2 | R1 | (China) Ordos International Circuit | 6 July | (United Kingdom) Dan Wells | (United Kingdom) Dan Wells | (United Kingdom) Dan Wells | (Hong Kong) KCMG | (India) Parth Ghorpade |
| 2 | R2 | (China) Ordos International Circuit | 7 July | (Italy) Antonio Giovinazzi | (China) Yin Hai Tao | (China) Yin Hai Tao | (Japan) Team UKYO with Super License | (China) Yin Hai Tao |
| 2 | R3 | (China) Ordos International Circuit | 7 July | (United Kingdom) Dan Wells | (Indonesia) Sean Gelael | (United Kingdom) Dan Wells | (Hong Kong) KCMG | (Indonesia) Sean Gelael |
| 3 | R1 | (China) Ordos International Circuit | 17 August | (Japan) Shota Kiyohara | (Italy) Antonio Giovinazzi | (Italy) Antonio Giovinazzi | (Philippines) Eurasia Motorsport | (Indonesia) Sean Gelael |
| 3 | R2 | (China) Ordos International Circuit | 18 August | (Italy) Antonio Giovinazzi | (Italy) Antonio Giovinazzi | (Italy) Antonio Giovinazzi | (Philippines) Eurasia Motorsport | (Indonesia) Sean Gelael |
| 3 | R3 | (China) Ordos International Circuit | 18 August | (Indonesia) Sean Gelael | (Indonesia) Sean Gelael | (United Kingdom) Dan Wells | (Hong Kong) KCMG | (India) Parth Ghorpade |
| 4 | R1 | (China) Guangdong International Circuit | 16 September | (Italy) Antonio Giovinazzi | (United Kingdom) Dan Wells | (India) Parth Ghorpade | (Philippines) Eurasia Motorsport | (India) Parth Ghorpade |
| 4 | R2 | (China) Guangdong International Circuit | 16 September | (United Kingdom) Dan Wells | (Italy) Antonio Giovinazzi | (Japan) Ren Nagabuchi | (Japan) Team UKYO with Super License | (Japan) Ren Nagabuchi |
| 4 | R3 | (China) Guangdong International Circuit | 16 September | (India) Parth Ghorpade | (India) Parth Ghorpade | (India) Parth Ghorpade | (Philippines) Eurasia Motorsport | (India) Parth Ghorpade |
| 5 | R1 | (Malaysia) Sepang International Circuit | 3 November | (Italy) Antonio Giovinazzi | (Italy) Antonio Giovinazzi | (Italy) Antonio Giovinazzi | (Philippines) Eurasia Motorsport | (India) Raj Bharath |
| 5 | R2 | (Malaysia) Sepang International Circuit | 4 November | (Italy) Antonio Giovinazzi | (Italy) Antonio Giovinazzi | (Italy) Antonio Giovinazzi | (Philippines) Eurasia Motorsport | (Indonesia) Sean Gelael |
| 5 | R3 | (Malaysia) Sepang International Circuit | 4 November | (Italy) Antonio Giovinazzi | (Italy) Antonio Giovinazzi | (Italy) Antonio Giovinazzi | (Philippines) Eurasia Motorsport | (India) Parth Ghorpade |
| 6 | R1 | (Malaysia) Sepang International Circuit | 8 December | (Australia) Aidan Wright | (Italy) Antonio Giovinazzi | (Italy) Antonio Giovinazzi | (Philippines) Eurasia Motorsport | (India) Raj Bharath |
| 6 | R2 | (Malaysia) Sepang International Circuit | 8 December | (Italy) Antonio Giovinazzi | (India) Parth Ghorpade | (India) Parth Ghorpade | (Philippines) Eurasia Motorsport | (India) Parth Ghorpade |
| 6 | R3 | (Malaysia) Sepang International Circuit | 8 December | (Australia) Aidan Wright | (Indonesia) Sean Gelael | (Indonesia) Sean Gelael | (Philippines) Eurasia Motorsport | (Indonesia) Sean Gelael |

== Standings ==
=== Drivers' championship ===
- Points for both championships were awarded as follows:

Race
| Position | 1st | 2nd | 3rd | 4th | 5th | 6th | 7th | 8th | 9th | 10th | PP |
|---|---|---|---|---|---|---|---|---|---|---|---|
| **Race 1&3** | 20 | 15 | 12 | 10 | 8 | 6 | 4 | 3 | 2 | 1 | 1 |
| **Race 2** | 12 | 10 | 8 | 6 | 4 | 3 | 2 | 1 | | | |

| Pos | Driver | SHI (China) | | | ORD (China) | | | ORD (China) | | | GUA (China) | | | SEP (Malaysia) | | | SEP (Malaysia) | | | Pts |
|---|---|---|---|---|---|---|---|---|---|---|---|---|---|---|---|---|---|---|---|---|
| 1 | (Italy) Antonio Giovinazzi | 3 | 4 | 2 | 2 | **4** | 2 | 1 | **1** | 3 | **5** | Ret | 2 | **1** | 1 | **1** | 1 | **Ret** | 2 | 229 |
| 2 | (United Kingdom) Dan Wells | 5 | 2 | 12 | **1** | 3 | **1** | 7 | 6 | 1 | 8 | **5** | 4 | 3 | 3 | 2 | 4 | 2 | 6 | 179 |
| 3 | (India) Parth Ghorpade | 2 | Ret | 5 | 3 | 9 | 5 | 6 | 3 | 2 | 1 | 8 | **1** | 5 | 9 | 3 | 5 | 1 | Ret | 150 |
| 4 | (Indonesia) Sean Gelael | 7 | 5 | 7 | 4 | 7 | 3 | 2 | 2 | **Ret** | 4 | 4 | 3 | 7 | 4 | 9 | Ret | 3 | 1 | 132 |
| 5 | (Japan) Ren Nagabuchi | 4 | Ret | 3 | 9 | 2 | 7 | 5 | 5 | 4 | 2 | 1 | 5 | 6 | 5 | 4 | 7 | Ret | 4 | 125 |
| 6 | (India) Raj Bharath | 8 | Ret | 4 | 5 | 5 | 8 | 4 | 7 | 5 | Ret | 3 | 6 | 2 | 2 | 6 | 2 | Ret | Ret | 104 |
| 7 | (Japan) Shota Kiyohara | **1** | **1** | **1** | | | | **3** | 4 | Ret | | | | | | | | | | 74 |
| 8 | (Malaysia) Afiq Ikhwan | 9 | 11 | 6 | | | | | | | | | | 4 | 6 | 5 | 6 | 4 | 3 | 50 |
| 9 | (China) Yin Hai Tao | 11 | 8 | 13 | 10 | 1 | 10 | 9 | 11 | 6 | 6 | 6 | 9 | 8 | 8 | 7 | Ret | 5 | 10 | 49 |
| 10 | (China) Zou Sirui | 10 | 6 | 11 | 12 | 11 | Ret | Ret | 9 | Ret | 3 | 2 | 8 | | | | | | | 32 |
| 11 | (Belgium) Sami Luka | 6 | 3 | 8 | 8 | 10 | 9 | | | | | | | | | | | | | 24 |
| 12 | (Malaysia) Akash Nandy | | | | 7 | 8 | 4 | 8 | 8 | Ret | | | | | | | Ret | 6 | 9 | 24 |
| 13 | (Australia) Aidan Wright | | | | | | | | | | | | | | | | **3** | Ret | **5** | 22 |
| 14 | (China) Sun Zheng | | | | 6 | 6 | 6 | | | | | | | | | | DNS | Ret | 8 | 18 |
| 15 | (Japan) Yuta Shiraishi | | | | | | | | | | 7 | 7 | 7 | | | | | | | 10 |
| 16 | (China) Li Chao | 12 | 7 | Ret | | | | 10 | 10 | 7 | | | | | | | | | | 9 |
| 17 | (Singapore) Sean Hudspeth | | | | | | | | | | | | | | | | 8 | Ret | 7 | 7 |
| 18 | (Thailand) Toby Earle | | | | | | | | | | | | | 9 | 7 | 10 | | | | 5 |
| 17 | (United States) David Cheng | | | | | | | | | | | | | 10 | Ret | 8 | | | | 4 |
| 18 | (Italy) Angelo Negro | Ret | 9 | 9 | | | | | | | | | | | | | | | | 2 |
| 19 | (Indonesia) Robin Tato | 13 | 10 | 10 | 11 | 12 | Ret | | | | | | | | | | | | | 1 |
| 20 | (Italy) Andrea Reggiani | | | | 13 | DNS | DNS | | | | | | | | | | | | | 0 |
| | (China) Bo Yuan | | | | | | | | | | | | | | | | Ret | Ret | Ret | 0 |
| Pos | Driver | SHI (China) | | | ORD (China) | | | ORD (China) | | | GUA (China) | | | SEP (Malaysia) | | | SEP (Malaysia) | | | Pts |

| Colour | Result |
|---|---|
| Gold | Winner |
| Silver | Second place |
| Bronze | Third place |
| Green | Points classification |
| Blue | Non-points classification |
| Blue | Non-classified finish (NC) |
| Purple | Retired, not classified (Ret) |
| Red | Did not qualify (DNQ) |
| Red | Did not pre-qualify (DNPQ) |
| Black | Disqualified (DSQ) |
| White | Did not start (DNS) |
| White | Withdrew (WD) |
| White | Race cancelled (C) |
| Blank | Did not practice (DNP) |
| Blank | Did not arrive (DNA) |
| Blank | Excluded (EX) |

**Bold** – Pole
Italics – Fastest Lap

=== Best Asian Driver Trophy ===
| Pos | Driver | SHI (China) | | | ORD (China) | | | ORD (China) | | | GUA (China) | | | SEP (Malaysia) | | | SEP (Malaysia) | | | Pts |
|---|---|---|---|---|---|---|---|---|---|---|---|---|---|---|---|---|---|---|---|---|
| 1 | (India) Parth Ghorpade | 2 | Ret | 5 | 3 | 9 | 5 | 6 | 3 | 2 | 1 | 8 | **1** | 5 | 9 | 3 | 5 | 1 | Ret | 196 |
| 2 | (Indonesia) Sean Gelael | 7 | 5 | 7 | 4 | 7 | 3 | 2 | 2 | **Ret** | 4 | 4 | 3 | 7 | 4 | 9 | Ret | 3 | 1 | 185 |
| 3 | (Japan) Ren Nagabuchi | 4 | Ret | 3 | 9 | 2 | 7 | 5 | 5 | 4 | 2 | 1 | 5 | 6 | 5 | 4 | 7 | Ret | 4 | 171 |
| 4 | (India) Raj Bharath | 8 | Ret | 4 | 5 | 5 | 8 | 4 | 7 | 5 | Ret | 3 | 6 | 2 | 2 | 6 | 2 | Ret | Ret | 150 |
| 5 | (China) Yin Hai Tao | 11 | 8 | 13 | 10 | 1 | 10 | 9 | 11 | 6 | 6 | 6 | 9 | 8 | 8 | 7 | Ret | 5 | 10 | 87 |
| 6 | (Malaysia) Afiq Ikhwan | 9 | 11 | 6 | | | | | | | | | | 4 | 6 | 5 | 6 | 4 | 3 | 82 |
| 7 | (Japan) Shota Kiyohara | **1** | **1** | **1** | | | | **3** | 4 | Ret | | | | | | | | | | 79 |
| 8 | (China) Zou Sirui | 10 | 6 | 11 | 12 | 11 | Ret | Ret | 9 | Ret | 3 | 2 | 8 | | | | | | | 53 |
| 9 | (Malaysia) Akash Nandy | | | | 7 | 8 | 4 | 8 | 8 | Ret | | | | | | | Ret | 6 | 9 | 45 |
| 10 | (China) Sun Zheng | | | | 6 | 6 | 6 | | | | | | | | | | DNS | Ret | 8 | 34 |
| 11 | (China) Li Chao | 12 | 7 | Ret | | | | 10 | 10 | 7 | | | | | | | | | | 23 |
| 12 | (Singapore) Sean Hudspeth | | | | | | | | | | | | | | | | 8 | Ret | 7 | 18 |
| 13 | (Japan) Yuta Shiraishi | | | | | | | | | | 7 | 7 | 7 | | | | | | | 17 |
| 14 | (Indonesia) Robin Tato | 13 | 10 | 10 | 11 | 12 | Ret | | | | | | | | | | | | | 16 |
| 15 | (Thailand) Toby Earle | | | | | | | | | | | | | 9 | 7 | 10 | | | | 12 |
| | (China) Bo Yuan | | | | | | | | | | | | | | | | Ret | Ret | Ret | 0 |
| Pos | Driver | SHI (China) | | | ORD (China) | | | ORD (China) | | | GUA (China) | | | SEP (Malaysia) | | | SEP (Malaysia) | | | Pts |

=== Teams' championship ===
| Pos | Team | Points |
|---|---|---|
| 1 | (Philippines) Eurasia Motorsport | 470 |
| 2 | (Japan) Team UKYO with Super License | 254 |
| 3 | (Hong Kong) KCMG | 221 |
| 4 | (India) Meco Motorsport | 102 |
| 5 | (Malaysia) Mahara | 50 |
| 6 | (Malaysia) Meritus.GP | 26 |
| 7 | (Macau) Asia Racing Team | 25 |
| 8 | (Hong Kong) PS Racing | 11 |
