= Formula Master =

Formula Master may refer to:

- ADAC Formel Masters, a 2008–2014 open-wheel racing series based in Germany
- Formula Masters China, a 2011–2017 single-seater racing series based in Asia
- Formula Masters Russia, a 2012–2015 single-seater racing series based in Russia
- International Formula Master, a 2005–2009 junior single-seater racing series based in Europe
