= Dan Wells (racing driver) =

British racing driver from Salisbury (born 1991)

- Nationality: British
- Born: Southampton (England)

Formula Pilota China career
- Debut season: 2012
- Current team: KCMG
- Car number: 16
- Starts: 12
- Wins: 3
- Poles: 2
- Fastest laps: 1

Previous series
- 2011 2010–11 2010: FR2.0 UK; FR2.0 UK Winter/Finals Series; Formula Ford 1600

Daniel Wells is a British racing driver from Salisbury.

== Career ==
=== Karting ===
Wells competed in eleven Senior Rotax kart races in the South of the United Kingdom - setting a fastest lap in a field of 24 in his first ever race at Clay Pigeon.

=== Formula Ford ===
In 2010, Wells graduated to Formula Ford 1600. Together with engineer John Percy - who ran him out of a single trailer - he took five class poles and five class wins in seven race weekends.

This brought Wells to the attention of the Racing Steps Foundation for their 2010 Formula Renault UK Winter Cup shoot-out. Wells graduated to Formula Renault UK in late 2010, taking part in the 2010 Formula Renault UK Winter Cup.

Wells finished fifth in his first ever race weekend, lapping a tenth of a second off experienced teammate Alex Lynn. In the second weekend, Wells suffered incidents and mechanical failures, coming away with a best result of 11th.

=== Formula Renault ===
Wells joined the 2011 Formula Renault UK championship with Atech Reid GP from Round 3. He finished tenth in the overall in the standings, 22 shy of seventh place, with a best result of 4th at Rockingham and Brands Hatch.

In the Formula Renault UK Final Series, Wells scored three podiums in six races, with a best result of second at Snetterton. He emerged as Vice Champion of the series, never finishing outside the top-six beating Red Bull and McLaren backed drivers. Over the winter, Wells worked to secure the necessary budget for a 2012 Formula Renault UK seat. However, in March 2012, it was announced that Formula Renault UK series would not take place in 2012.

=== Formula Pilota China ===
On 28 March 2012, Wells announced he would compete in the Formula Pilota China Series in 2012, for the Hong Kong-based KCMG team.

== Racing record ==
=== Career summary ===
Season	Series	Team	Races	Wins	Poles	F/Laps	Podiums	Points	Position
2010	Club Formula Ford 1600	JRP Motorsport	11	5	5	2	9	N/A	N/A
2010	Formula Renault UK Winter Series	Fortec Motorsport	6	0	0	0	0	56	11th
2011	Formula Renault UK	Atech Reid GP	20	0	0	0	0	251	10th
2011	Formula Renault UK Finals Series	Atech Reid GP	6	0	0	0	3	136	**2nd**
2012	Formula Pilota China	KCMG	18	3	3	3	9	179	**2nd**
2013	Formula Masters China	Cebu Pacific Air by KCMG	3	0	0	0	0	7	13th
2014	Formula Masters China	Cebu Pacific Air by KCMG	18	2	0	1	12	177	**3rd**
2014	British Formula 3 International Series	Double R Racing	3	0	0	0	1	41	10th
2014	Japanese Formula 3 Championship	Toda Racing	2	0	0	0	0	0	14th
2014	Macau Grand Prix	Toda Racing	2	0	0	0	0	N/A	17th
2015	Asian Formula Renault Series	BlackArts Racing Team	12	10	7	9	10	330	**1st**
2015	TCR International Series	Campos Racing	0	0	0	0	0	0	NC
2015–16	Asian Le Mans Series - GT Am	KCMG	1	1	1	1	1	26	**3rd**
2016	Audi R8 LMS Cup China	KCMG	2	0	0	0	0	18	14th
2017	FRD LMP3 Series	Eurasia Motorsport	8	0	0	0	1	36	10th
2018	F4 Chinese Championship	BlackArts Racing Team	3	0	0	0	2	55	9th
2018	GT4 International Cup	3Y Technology	3	0	0	0	0	N/A	7th
2019	Lamborghini Super Trofeo Asia	Leipert Motorsport	6	0	0	0	4	38	7th
2019–20	Asian Le Mans Series - LMP3	Inter Europol Competition	2	0	0	0	0	8	12th
2021	Lamborghini Super Trofeo Europe - Pro	Leipert Motorsport	?	1	?	?	?	102	4th
2022	Lamborghini Super Trofeo Europe - Pro-Am	Rexal FFF Racing Team	12	1	0	0	6	105	**2nd**
2023	Lamborghini Super Trofeo Asia - Pro-Am	DW Evans GT	12	8	0	0	11	160	**1st**
2024	Lamborghini Super Trofeo Asia - Pro	DW Evans GT	12	4	0	2	10	141	**1st**

=== Complete Eurocup Formula Renault 2.0 results ===
(key) (Races in bold indicate pole position; races in italics indicate fastest lap)

Year	Entrant	1	2	3	4	5	6	7	8	9	10	11	12	13	14	DC	Points
2012	Atech Reid GP	ALC; 1	ALC; 2	SPA; 1	SPA; 2	NÜR; 1	NÜR; 2	MSC; 1	MSC; 2	HUN; 1	HUN; 2	LEC; 1	LEC; 2	CAT; 1; 24	CAT; 2 Ret	NC†	0

† As Wells was a guest driver, he was ineligible for points
