= Mahaveer Raghunathan =

Indian racing driver (born 1998)

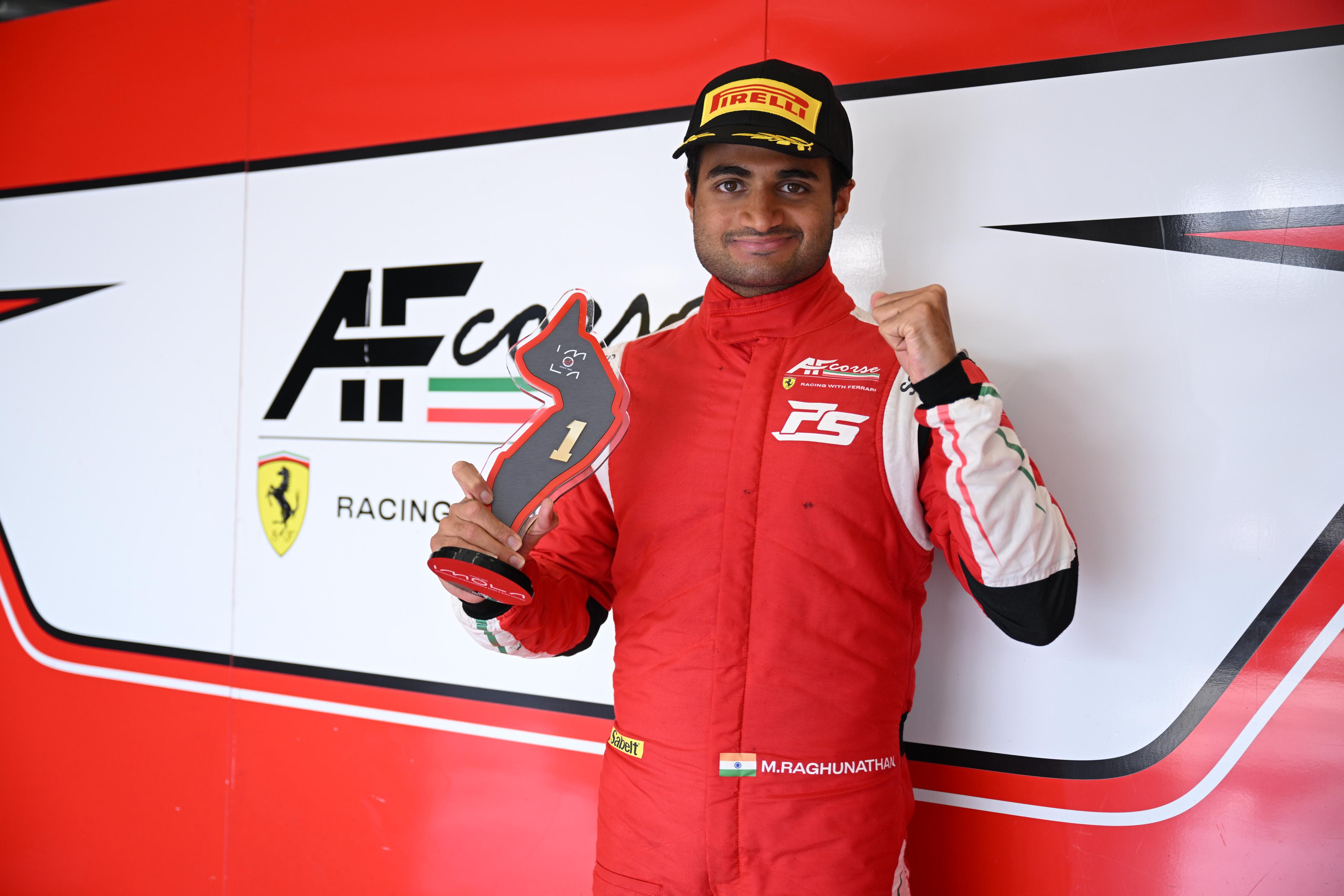
- Raghunathan in 2025
- Nationality: Indian
- Born: 17 November 1998 (age 27) Chennai, Tamil Nadu, India

Italian GT Endurance Championship career
- Debut season: 2023
- Current team: AF Corse
- Categorisation: FIA Silver
- Former teams: Lazarus Corse, Imperiale Racing
- Starts: 12
- Wins: 3
- Podiums: 8
- Poles: 3
- Fastest laps: 0
- Best finish: 2nd in 2025

Previous series
- 2019 2016–17 2016 2016 2015 2014–15 2014: FIA Formula 2 Championship; BOSS GP; GP3 Series; Auto GP; European Formula 3 Championship; MRF Formula 2000; Italian Formula 4 Championship

Mahaveer Raghunathan (born 17 November 1998) is an Indian racing driver. He became only the third Indian driver to test a Formula One car when he participated in a private test with Alfa Romeo Racing on 5 August 2021 at the Hungaroring, before testing with McLaren in July 2023 at Portimão and getting sued two years later for unpaid testing fees. Raghunathan is the 2017 BOSS GP champion in the Formula class, and gained notoriety while racing in Formula 2 in 2019—a season plagued by incidents and a lack of pace. He last competed in the 2025 Italian GT Championship for AF Corse.

== Career ==
=== Junior series ===
Raghunathan started his racing career in karting in 2012, where he remained active until 2013. He also made his formula racing debut in 2012 in four races of the JK Racing Asia Series for the Meco Racing team.

In 2013, Raghunathan competed in the MRF Challenge Formula 1600, finishing sixth. He also took part in the final race weekend of the Formula Masters China series at the Shanghai International Circuit for the Cebu Pacific Air by KCMG team.

In 2014, Raghunathan moved to the new Italian F4 Championship, debuting on the second race weekend for the F&M team. He finished 12th in the championship.

=== Formula 3 ===
At the beginning of 2015, Raghunathan took part in the final race weekend of the MRF Challenge Formula 2000 series at the Madras Motor Race Track. He then returned to Europe to take part in the European Formula 3 Championship for the Motopark team. He failed to get any points, finishing 39th in the championship. He participated in the official GP3 post season test with the Campos and Trident teams, in preparation for the 2016 GP3 Series, but he only raced in the first round of the championship for Koiranen GP. He also tested with the Coloni Motorsport team in Auto GP.

=== Auto GP and BOSS GP ===
In 2016, Raghunathan raced in the Auto GP championship with Italian team PS Racing, finishing second in the championship. In the same year, he also raced in the BOSS GP series in the Formula Class and secured two podiums in his class.

In 2017, Raghunathan continued racing in BOSS GP's Formula Class Championship races in his class. He ended the season as the champion of the Formula Class, as the only driver to compete in all of the season's races. He is the first and only Indian to win the BOSS GP Championship.

=== World Endurance Championship ===
Raghunathan took part in the FIA WEC rookie test at the end of the 2017 season, driving an Oreca 07 for G-Drive Racing.

In November 2022, Raghunathan drove for Algarve Pro Racing at the rookie test in Bahrain.

=== FIA Formula 2 Championship ===
Following a season in which he made just one race appearance in the Le Mans Cup, Raghunathan progressed to the FIA Formula 2 Championship in 2019, racing alongside Jordan King for MP Motorsport.

Raghunathan collected numerous penalty points throughout the season. Infringements included passing the chequered flag twice in Bahrain, failing to stop at the weighbridge during practice at Baku, overtaking a car before the safety car line in Baku, collided with Jack Aitken and left the track to gain an advantage twice at Monaco and three virtual safety car infringements at Paul Ricard. Following the French round, Raghunathan had 12 penalty points on his licence, resulting in a race ban for the Austrian round. Raghunathan returned to the series at Silverstone, however he continued to collect penalty points – failing to slow down for yellow flags in qualifying at Spa-Francorchamps, not following track-limit procedures in Sochi and failed to follow the practice start procedure at Abu Dhabi. Raghunathan consequently ended the season with 12 penalty points on his licence, which would have resulted in another race ban if the season had additional races. After he received his ban in France, Formula One Grand Prix winner Johnny Herbert labelled him as "someone who is not aware of what is going on around him".

Raghunathan collected his only point of the season thanks to a reduced field in Italy. He finished the season 20th in the standings, scoring only a single point and being the last-placed driver among those who had scored points.

=== Formula One ===
In August 2021, nearly two years after his last appearance behind the wheel of a race car, Raghunathan became the third Indian to drive a Formula One car when he tested the Alfa Romeo Racing C38 alongside Théo Pourchaire at the Hungaroring where he set a time 1.9 seconds slower than the Frenchman. In July 2023, nearly two years after his last Formula One test, Raghunathan tested a McLaren MCL35 at Portimão, but in 2025 he was successfully sued by the team for unpaid testing fees.

=== Italian GT ===
Raghunathan competed in the Italian GT Endurance Championship in 2023, driving a Lamborghini Huracán GT3 for Imperiale Racing in the Pro-Am class alongside teammates Jack Bartholomew and Miguel Garcia. Raghunathan achieved his first professional career podium by coming in third at Round 3. He returned to the series in 2024, having been inducted into Aston Martin's AMR Driver Academy. He was signed by Lazarus Corse to compete in the endurance rounds of the championship alongside William Alatalo and three-time MotoGP champion Jorge Lorenzo.

Raghunathan competing in Mugello Circuit in 2025

In 2025, Raghunathan joined the AF Corse team in the Sprint and Endurance Championship, and finished second in the championship, winning three races and finishing eight times on the podium driving the Ferrari 296 GT3.

== Racing record ==
=== Racing career summary ===
Season	Series	Team	Races	Wins	Poles	F/Laps	Podiums	Points	Position
2012	JK Racing Asia Series	Meco Racing	4	0	0	0	0	0	NC†
2013	MRF Challenge Formula 1600 Championship	MRF Racing	?	?	?	?	?	?	6th
2013	Formula Masters China	Cebu Pacific Air by KCMG	3	0	0	0	0	0	21st
2014	Italian F4 Championship	F & M	18	0	0	0	0	45	12th
2014–15	MRF Challenge Formula 2000 Championship	MRF Racing	3	0	0	0	0	5	21st
2015	FIA Formula 3 European Championship	Motopark	26	0	0	0	0	0	39th
2015	Masters of Formula 3	Motopark	1	0	0	0	0	0	17th
2015	Euroformula Open Championship	Motul Team West-Tec F3	2	0	0	0	0	0	NC†
2015	Formula Renault 2.0 Alps Series	Cram Motorsport	2	0	0	0	0	0	NC†
2016	Auto GP Formula Open Championship	PS Racing	10	0	0	0	2	151	**2nd**
2016	BOSS GP Series - Formula Class	PS Racing	8	0	0	0	2	118	5th
2016	GP3 Series	Koiranen GP	2	0	0	0	0	0	27th
2017	BOSS GP Series - Formula Class	PS Racing	14	3	4	1	13	263	**1st**
2018	Le Mans Cup - LMP3	United Autosports	1	0	0	0	0	0.5	46th
2019	FIA Formula 2 Championship	MP Motorsport	20	0	0	0	0	1	20th
2023	Italian GT Endurance Championship - GT3 Pro-Am	Imperiale Racing	3	0	0	0	1	32	6th
2024	Italian GT Endurance Championship - GT3 Pro-Am	Lazarus Corse	2	0	0	0	0	14	NC
2025	Italian GT Endurance Championship - GT3 Pro-Am	AF Corse	4	0	0	0	2	74	**2nd**
2025	Italian GT Sprint Championship - GT3 Pro-Am	AF Corse	8	3	0	0	4	103	**2nd**

=== Complete JK Racing Asia Series results ===
(key) (Races in bold indicate pole position; races in italics indicate fastest lap.)

Year	Team	1	2	3	4	5	6	7	8	9	10	11	12	13	14	15	16	DC	Points
2012	Meco Racing	SEP; 1	SEP; 2	SEP; 3	SEP; 4	LEC; 1	LEC; 2	SPA; 1	SPA; 2	SIL; 1	SIL; 2	IND1; 1	IND1; 2	IND2; 1 Ret	IND2; 2 Ret	IND2; 3; 12	IND2; 4; 10	NC	-

=== Complete Formula Masters China results ===
(key) (Races in bold indicate pole position; races in italics indicate fastest lap.)

Year	Team	1	2	3	4	5	6	7	8	9	10	11	12	13	14	15	16	17	18	DC	Points
2013	Cebu Pacific Air by KCMG	ZHU; 1	ZHU; 2	ZHU; 3	SHI; 1	SHI; 2	SHI; 3	ORD; 1	ORD; 2	INJ; 1	INJ; 2	INJ; 3	INJ; 4	SEP; 1	SEP; 2	SEP; 3	SHI; 1; 14	SHI; 2; 15	SHI; 3; 12	21st	0

=== Complete Italian F4 Championship results ===
(key) (Races in bold indicate pole position; races in italics indicate fastest lap.)

Year	Team	1	2	3	4	5	6	7	8	9	10	11	12	13	14	15	16	17	18	19	20	21	DC	Points
2014	F & M	ADR; 1	ADR; 2	ADR; 3	IMO1; 1; 14	IMO1; 2; 17	IMO1; 3; 8	MUG; 1; 19	MUG; 2; 13	MUG; 3; 8	MAG; 1; 20	MAG; 2; 18	MAG; 3; 19	VLL; 1; 14	VLL; 2; 12	VLL; 3; 15	MNZ; 1; 11	MNZ; 2; 6	MNZ; 3; 12	IMO2; 1; 6	IMO2; 2; 6	IMO2; 3; 6	12th	45

=== Complete MRF Challenge Formula 2000 Championship results ===
(key) (Races in bold indicate pole position; races in italics indicate fastest lap.)

Year	1	2	3	4	5	6	7	8	9	10	11	12	DC	Points
2014-15	LOS; 1	LOS; 2	LOS; 3	LOS; 4	BHR; 1	BHR; 2	BHR; 3	BHR; 4	MMR; 1; 8	MMR; 2; 11	MMR; 3 DNS	MMR; 4; 10	21st	5

=== Complete FIA Formula 3 European Championship results ===
(key) (Races in bold indicate pole position; races in italics indicate fastest lap.)

Year	Entrant	Engine	1	2	3	4	5	6	7	8	9	10	11	12	13	14	15	16	17	18	19	20	21	22	23	24	25	26	27	28	29	30	31	32	33	DC	Points
2015	Motopark	Volkswagen	SIL; 1; 26	SIL; 2; 25	SIL; 3; 29	HOC; 1; 24	HOC; 2; 31	HOC; 3; 30	PAU; 1 DNQ	PAU; 2 DNQ	PAU; 3 DNQ	MNZ; 1 Ret	MNZ; 2; 24	MNZ; 3; 25	SPA; 1; 29	SPA; 2; 27	SPA; 3; 24	NOR; 1; 25	NOR; 2; 20	NOR; 3; 25	ZAN; 1; 27	ZAN; 2; 30	ZAN; 3; 28	RBR; 1; 31	RBR; 2; 25	RBR; 3; 29	ALG; 1; 30	ALG; 2; 23	ALG; 3 DNS	NÜR; 1; 30	NÜR; 2; 26	NÜR; 3; 22	HOC; 1	HOC; 2	HOC; 3	39th	0

=== Complete Masters of Formula 3 results ===
Year	Team	Car	Qualifying	Quali Race	Main race
2015	(Germany) Motopark	Dallara F315	17th	17th	17th

=== Complete Auto GP Formula Open Championship results ===
(key) (Races in bold indicate pole position; races in italics indicate fastest lap.)

Year	Team	1	2	3	4	5	6	7	8	9	10	Pos	Pts
2016	PS Racing	ADR; 1; 2	ADR; 2; 3	MNZ; 1; 15	MNZ; 2; 6	ASS; 1; 7	ASS; 2; 5	BRN; 1; 8	BRN; 2; 4	IMO; 1; 4	IMO; 2 Ret	2nd	151

=== Complete GP3 Series results ===
(key) (Races in bold indicate pole position; races in italics indicate fastest lap.)

Year	Entrant	1	2	3	4	5	6	7	8	9	10	11	12	13	14	15	16	17	18	Pos	Pts
2016	Koiranen GP	CAT; FEA; 23	CAT; SPR; 24	RBR; FEA	RBR; SPR	SIL; FEA	SIL; SPR	HUN; FEA	HUN; SPR	HOC; FEA	HOC; SPR	SPA; FEA	SPA; SPR	MNZ; FEA	MNZ; SPR	SEP; FEA	SEP; SPR	YMC; FEA	YMC; SPR	27th	0

=== Complete BOSS GP Series results ===
(key) (Races in bold indicate pole position; races in italics indicate fastest lap.)

Year	Team	1	2	3	4	5	6	7	8	9	10	11	12	13	14	Pos	Pts
2016	PS Racing	HOC; 1	HOC; 2	RBR; 1	RBR; 2	MNZ; 1; 15	MNZ; 2; 6	ASS; 1; 7	ASS; 2; 5	BRN; 1; 8	BRN; 2; 4	IMO; 1; 4	IMO; 2 Ret			5th	118
2017	PS Racing	HOC; 1; 5	HOC; 2; 6	ZAN; 1; 3	ZAN; 2; 2	LEC; 1; 5	LEC; 2; 6	ZOL; 1; 1	ZOL; 2; 3	ASS; 1; 2	ASS; 2; 4	BRN; 1; 5	BRN; 2; 11	IMO; 1; 3	IMO; 2; 2	1st	263

=== Complete FIA Formula 2 Championship results ===
(key) (Races in bold indicate pole position; races in italics indicate points for the fastest lap of top ten finishers)

Year	Entrant	1	2	3	4	5	6	7	8	9	10	11	12	13	14	15	16	17	18	19	20	21	22	23	24	DC	Points
2019	MP Motorsport	BHR; FEA; 18	BHR; SPR; 19	BAK; FEA; 11	BAK; SPR; 13	CAT; FEA; 16	CAT; SPR; 19	MON; FEA; 15	MON; SPR; Ret	LEC; FEA; 12	LEC; SPR; 18	RBR; FEA; EX	RBR; SPR; EX	SIL; FEA; 15	SIL; SPR; 18	HUN; FEA; 17	HUN; SPR; 19	SPA; FEA; C	SPA; SPR; C	MNZ; FEA; 10	MNZ; SPR; 13	SOC; FEA; 17	SOC; SPR; 17	YMC; FEA; Ret	YMC; SPR; 15	20th	1

=== Complete Italian GT Championship results ===
==== Italian GT Endurance Championship ====
(key) (Races in bold indicate pole position; races in italics indicate fastest lap.)

Year	Team	Car	Class	1	2	3	4	DC	Points
2023	Imperiale Racing	Lamborghini Huracán GT3 Evo	Pro-Am	PER; 6	MUG	MNZ; 4	VLL; 6	6th	32
2024	Lazarus Corse	Aston Martin Vantage AMR GT3 Evo	Pro	VAL; 14	MUG; 11	IMO	MON	NC (Note: Not classified, as Raghunathan did not participate in at least three events according to series regulations.)	0
