= Matt Solomon =

Hong Kong racing driver (born 1996)

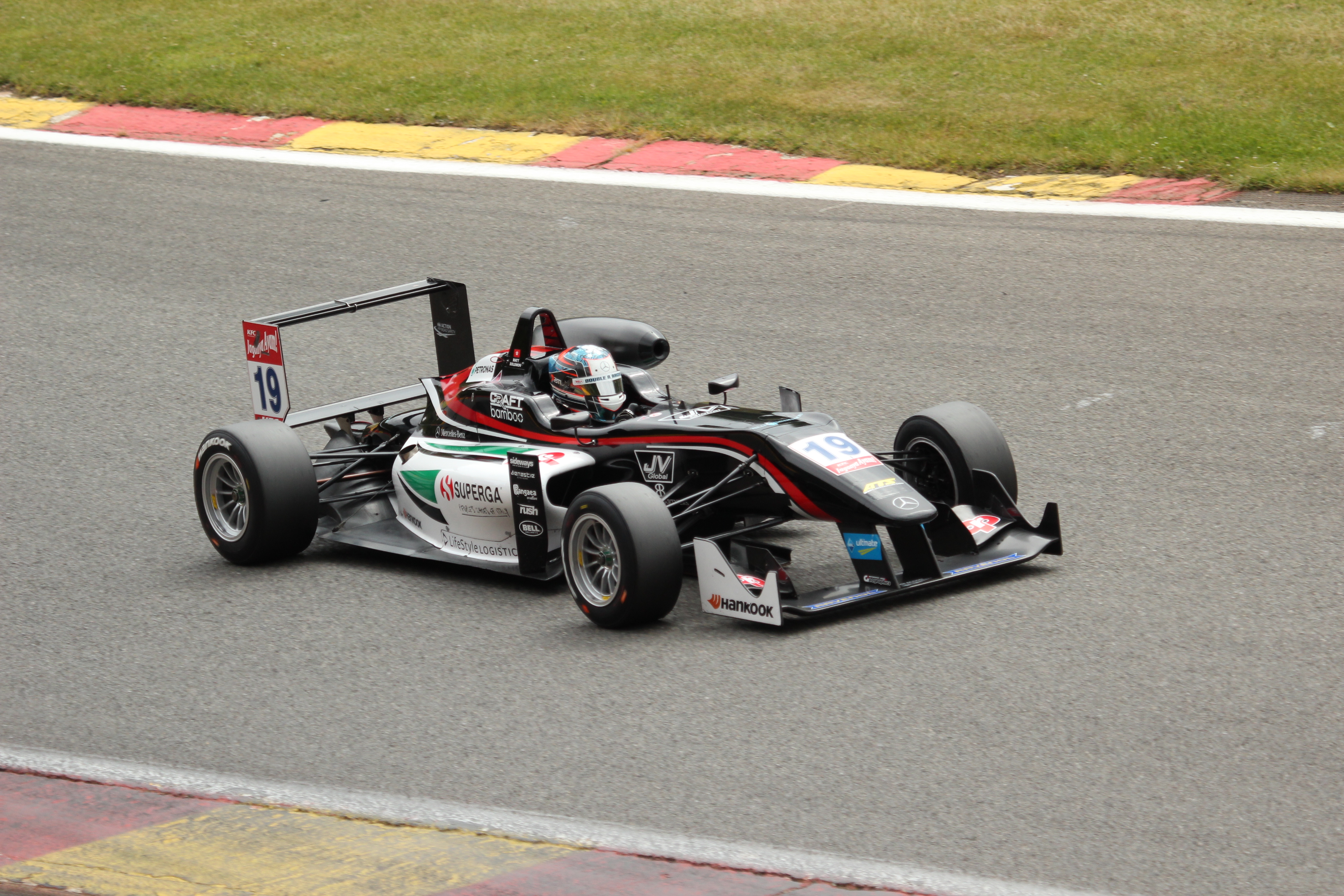
- Nationality: (Hong Kong) Hongkonger
- Born: 19 February 1996 (age 30) Hong Kong

Chinese name
- Traditional Chinese: 蘇誠峻
- Simplified Chinese: 苏诚峻
Transcriptions
Standard Mandarin
- Hanyu Pinyin: Sū Chéngjùn
Yue: Cantonese
- Jyutping: Sou^{1} Sing^{4}zeon^{3}
- Hong Kong Romanisation: So Shing-chun

Matthew Barry Solomon (born 19 February 1996) is a Hong Kong racing driver who currently competes in the MTCS GT Challenge.

== Career ==
Solomon began his motorsport career in kart racing in 2007, where he remained active until 2012. In 2013, Solomon switched to formula racing and competed for Eurasia Motorsport in Formula Masters China. He scored in every race and scored four third places for best results. He finished fifth in the overall standings. In addition, he completed as a guest drive in Formula Renault for Prema in Europe. In 2014, Solomon remained in the Formula Masters China at Eurasia Motorsport. He won five races and finished second overall with 187 to 215 points James Munro. In addition, Solomon was active in GT racing that same year. He finished ninth in the Chinese Audi R8 LMS Cup and 28th in the GT3 class of the Asian GT Championship.

In the winter of 2014/15, Solomon competed for a MRF Challenge Formula 2000 event, finishing second. Subsequently, Solomon 2015 moved to European Formula 3 Championship to Double R Racing.

Solomon is consultant ("in-house racing specialist") for computergame-company Animoca Brands.

== Racing record ==
=== Career summary ===
Season	Series	Team	Races	Wins	Poles	F/Laps	Podiums	Points	Position
2013	Formula Masters China	Eurasia Motorsport	18	0	0	1	4	128	5th
2013	Formula Renault 2.0 Alps Series	Prema Junior	2	0	0	0	0	0	NC†
2013	GT Asia Series - GT3	Erebus Motorsport	2	1	0	1	1	—N/a	NC†
2014	Formula Masters China	Eurasia Motorsport	18	5	2	6	12	187	2nd
2014	Audi R8 LMS Cup China	Audi Hong Kong Team	12	0	0	1	1	61	9th
2014	GT Asia Series - GT3	Absolute Racing	2	0	0	0	0	22	28th
2014	GT Asia Series - GTM	Tiger Racing Team	?	?	?	?	?	?	?
2014-15	MRF Challenge Formula 2000 Championship	MRF Racing	4	0	0	0	1	30	12th
2015	FIA Formula 3 European Championship	Double R Racing	33	0	0	0	0	0	28th
2015	Macau Grand Prix	Double R Racing	2	0	0	0	0	—N/a	18th
2016	Asian Le Mans Sprint Cup - LMP3	Wineurasia Motorsport	2	0	1	0	0	0	14th
2016	GT Asia Series - GT3	Mercedes-AMG Driving Academy-Team AAI	2	0	0	0	0	0	NC
2016	Australian GT Championship	Eggleston Motorsport	7	1	0	2	2	0	NC†
2016	Australian Endurance Championship	Hog's Breath Cafe / Griffith Corporation	1	0	0	0	0	25	?
2025	MSCC Miata Spec Series - Pro	Web3 GP/Edgesport Racing	6	4	2	3	4	?	2nd
2025	Makabayan Endurance Race Challenge	MSCC Mazda	1	1	1	1	1	140‡	1st‡
2026	Macao Touring Car Series - GT Challenge	Team TRC	2	1	0	1	2	35	3rd

† As he was a guest driver, Solomon was ineliglble to score points.

== Personal life ==
Solomon was born to an Australian father and Chinese mother. He has two younger brothers. He usually drives under the Hong Kong license, but he also has an Australian passport.
