= Eurasia Motorsport =

Philippine racing team

(Philippines) Eurasia Motorsport
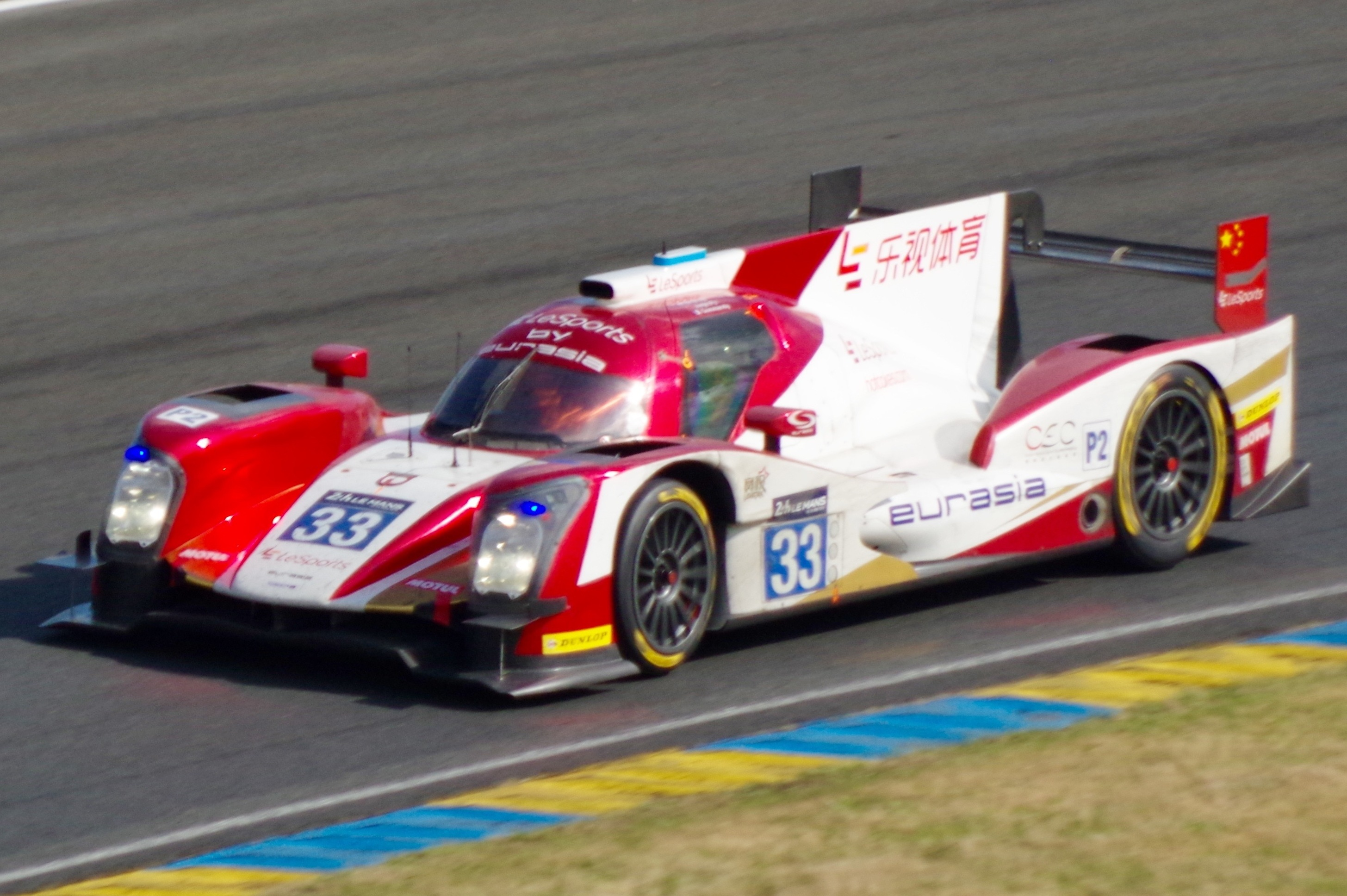
- Founded: 2004
- Base: Mabalacat, Pampanga, Philippines
- Team principal(s): Mark Goddard
- Founder(s): Mark Goddard; Piers Hunnisett; Martin Quick
- Current series: TCR Asia Series
- Former series: Asian Le Mans Series; FRD LMP3 Series; Blancpain GT Series Asia; European Le Mans Series; FIA World Endurance Championship; Formula BMW Pacific; Formula V6 Asia; Formula Masters China; Asian Formula Renault Series
- Noted drivers: (United Kingdom) Richard Bradley (Netherlands) Nick de Bruijn (Indonesia) Sean Gelael (Italy) Antonio Giovinazzi (France) Tristan Gommendy (Zimbabwe) Axcil Jefferies (China) Pu Junjin (Spain) Roberto Merhi (Australia) Daniel Ricciardo (Philippines) Marlon Stöckinger
- Teams' Championships: 2002 Asian Formula Three Championship; 2007–08 Asia F3 Pacific Series; 2012 Formula Pilota China
- Drivers' Championships: 2002 Asian Formula Three Championship; 2007–08 Asia F3 Pacific Series; 2010 Formula BMW Pacific; 2012 Formula Pilota China; 2017 Blancpain GT Series Asia Am-Am
- Website: https://eurasiamotorsport.com/

Eurasia Motorsport, formerly known as Team Goddard, Minardi Team Asia and Team Eurasia, is an auto racing team from the Philippines, founded in 2003 by British racing driver Mark Goddard. Registered in Hong Kong, the team operates from two locations each situated near a racing circuit; Clark International Speedway in Mabalacat, Pampanga, Philippines and Sepang International Circuit in Sepang, Selangor, Malaysia. Eurasia currently race in the TCR Asia Series.

Since their inception, the team have competed in junior formula, sports car racing, and touring car racing, including series such as Blancpain GT Series Asia, Formula BMW Pacific, Asian Le Mans Series, and European Le Mans Series. Eurasia have also previously participated in the 24 Hours of Le Mans from 2016 to 2021, where they were the first and, so far, the only racing team based in the Philippines to have raced at Le Mans.

== History ==
British racing driver Mark Goddard moved to Asia in 1994 to manage and race with various racing teams in Formula Toyota, Formula Asia, and the Asian Formula Three Championship, eventually earning a drivers' title in the latter series with a team entered under his own name. Goddard retired from racing in 2004 and founded Eurasia Motorsport in the Philippines later that year.

=== Junior formula ===
Eurasia Motorsport entered a partnership with Italian Formula One team Minardi in 2004 to run their junior development team for Asian young drivers. The combined team would race as Minardi Team Asia in both the Formula BMW Pacific series and the Asian Formula Three Championship. In the two years that the team competitively raced, they were listed under the Malaysian and Hong Kong flags.

In the 2006 Formula BMW Asia season, Daniel Ricciardo won two races, both at Bira Circuit, ending the season in 3rd overall behind Sam Abay and eventual champion Earl Bamber.

Eurasia Motorsport won the 2010 Formula BMW Pacific drivers' title with rookie Richard Bradley, scoring 7 wins and 217 points.

The team completed a dominant campaign in the 2012 Formula Pilota China season, as they would score 10 victories across 18 races. Team driver and series debutant Antonio Giovinazzi would be responsible for six of the ten, finishing as the overall champion. Eurasia's efforts would also allow them to take the Best Asian Driver Trophy with Parth Ghorpade and the overall team's title. They would fight for the driver's titles on two more occasions in 2014 with Matt Solomon and in 2016 with Aidan Read, completing the season 2nd overall on both occasions.

=== Sports car racing ===
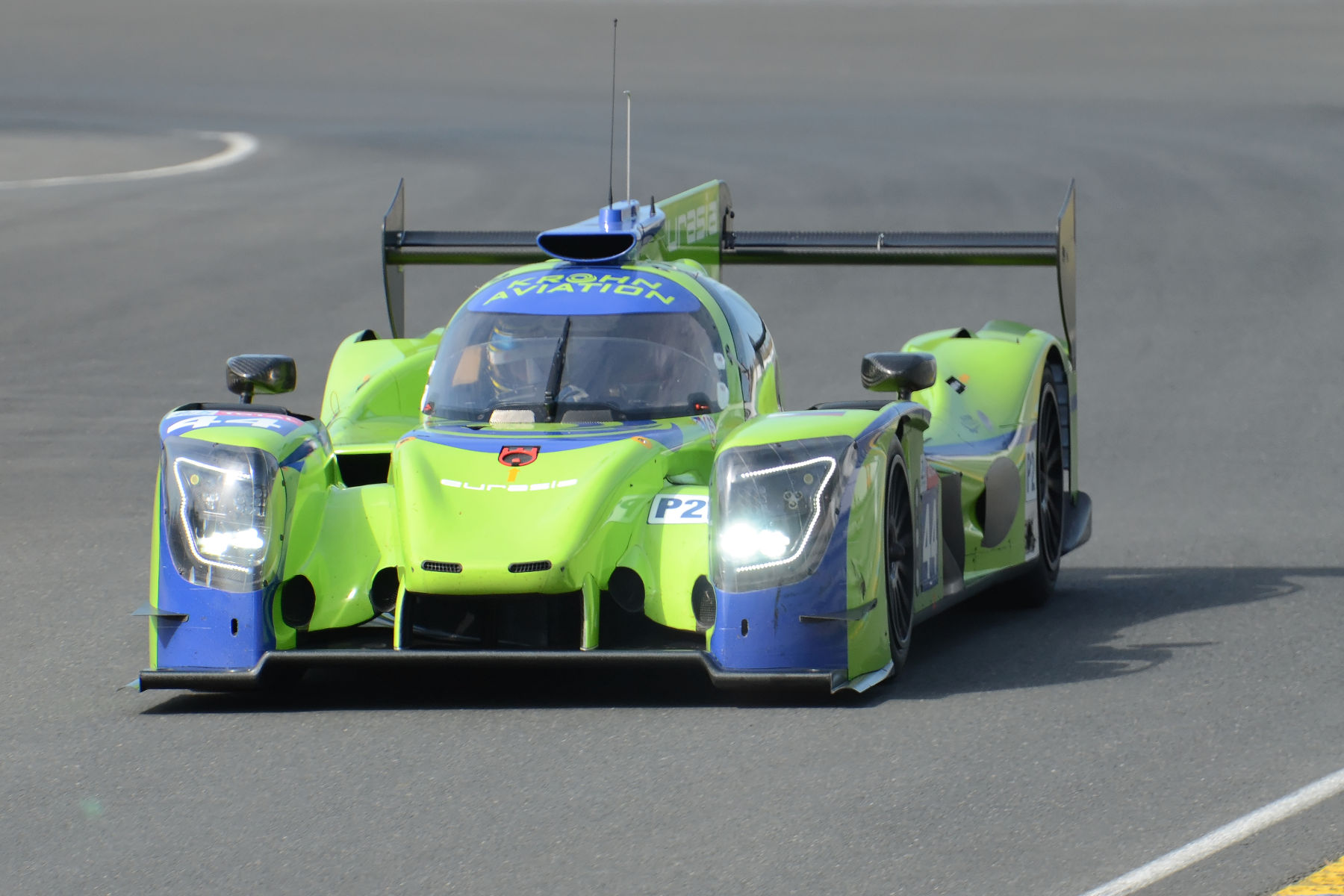
Eurasia Motorsport's Ligier JS P217 at the 2018 24 Hours of Le Mans.

Eurasia Motorsport explored sports car racing for the first time in 2014, when they announced that they would be competing in the Asian Le Mans Series. They contested the season against OAK Racing, the only other entry in the LMP2 class, however, were beaten comprehensively by the French squad, who were far more experienced in comparison and would later proceed to sweep the season. Amidst further mixed results in later seasons, Eurasia Motorsport were able to win the final two rounds of the 2015–16 Asian Le Mans Series, doing so in a second entry driven by Sean Gelael and Antonio Giovinazzi. The team switched to LMP3 machinery a few years later in 2018–19. In 2019–20, they entered two cars, bearing numbers #1 and #36. Each car saw contrasting campaigns; the #36 secured three consecutive podium finishes and a pole position to conclude the season 3rd in class, whereas the #1 retired in three out of the four rounds.

The team expanded their sports car programme to Europe in 2015, by entering the 2015 European Le Mans Series in the LMP2 class with Nick de Bruijn and Pu Junjin. Richard Bradley would return to Eurasia to substitute for Junjin in the fourth round. The team concluded their first ELMS season 6th in class, settling into the midfield. Tristan Gommendy joined Eurasia in 2016, where they would improve to 5th in class, collecting a podium in the 2016 4 Hours of Red Bull Ring. That same year, Eurasia Motorsport also competed in the 2016 24 Hours of Le Mans, entering an Oreca 05 with Gommendy, de Bruijn, and Junjin. Their entry marked the first time in the history of the 24 Hours of Le Mans that a team from the Philippines would participate in the event. Despite suffering sensor issues, the team remained out of trouble to finish in the top 10, taking home 9th overall and 5th in class. Eurasia attempted Le Mans four more times in 2017, 2018, 2020, and 2021, but were unable to repeat the same success. As of 2025, Eurasia Motorsport are the only racing team from the Philippines to have competed at Le Mans.

In 2017, Eurasia Motorsport joined the 2017 Blancpain GT Series Asia, entering an Aston Martin V12 Vantage GT3 with James Cai and Kenneth Lim in the Am-Am class. Despite missing a round at Suzuka Circuit, Cai and Lim won the Am-Am class championship, five points clear of the closest competitor.

Eurasia made a one-off appearance in the 2019–20 FIA World Endurance Championship, competing in the 2020 6 Hours of Spa-Francorchamps as a precursor for their appearance at the 2020 24 Hours of Le Mans. In preparation, Eurasia were temporarily based in Ligier's factory in Le Mans, France and were assisted by the Automobile Club de l'Ouest in traveling to Stavelot, Belgium for the race amidst travel restrictions related to the COVID-19 pandemic. Eurasia experienced multiple driver changes as a result of the restrictions, with Nick Foster, Roberto Merhi, and Nobuya Yamanaka forming the final lineup.

In 2021, Eurasia Motorsport confirmed that they would be fielding a Ligier JS P217 for the 2021 24 Hours of Daytona in collaboration with American outfit Rick Ware Racing. The car would be driven by Austin Dillon, Cody Ware, Salih Yoluç, and Sven Müller, who replaced Mathieu Jaminet who was originally set to drive, but had tested positive for COVID-19. Racing as RWR-Eurasia, they fared well in the race, crossing the line 10th overall and 4th in class.

=== Touring car racing ===
In 2019, Eurasia Motorsport entered the 2019 TCR Asia Series with Daniel Miranda and Gao Hua Yang. Miranda collected two podiums and Yang earned one, ending their seasons in 4th and 5th overall respectively. Eurasia Motorsport returned to the championship six years later in the 2025 TCR Asia Series with Andy Liang Wenyao and Reignbert Diwa. The pair scored a double podium for the team at Sepang International Circuit.

== Current series results ==
=== TCR Asia Series ===
Year	Car	Drivers	Races	Wins	Poles	F/Laps	Podiums	Points	D.C.	T.C.
2019	Hyundai i30 N TCR	(Philippines) Daniel Julián Miranda	10	0	0	0	2	84	4th	3rd
2019	Hyundai i30 N TCR	(China) Gao Hua Yang	10	0	0	0	1	71	5th	3rd
2025	Hyundai Elantra N TCR	(Taiwan) Andy Liang Wenyao								
2025	Hyundai Elantra N TCR	(Philippines) Reignbert Diwa								

=== TCR World Tour ===
Year	Car	Drivers	Races	Wins	Poles	F/Laps	Podiums	Points	D.C.	T.C.
2025	Hyundai Elantra N TCR	(Chinese Taipei) Andy Liang†	6	0	0	0	0	0	47th	?
2025	Hyundai Elantra N TCR	(Philippines) Reignbert Diwa	6	0	0	0	0	0	49th	?

† Liang drove for Z.Speed N MAS in round 8.

== Former series results ==
=== Formula V6 Asia ===
Year	Car	Drivers	Races	Wins	Poles	F/Laps	Podiums	Points	D.C.	T.C.
2006	Tatuus-Renault V4Y RS	(Indonesia) Ananda Mikola	12	2	0	0	5	98	3rd	4th
2007	Tatuus-Renault V4Y RS	(India) Parthiva Sureshwaren†	8	0	0	0	2	36	8th	6th

† Sureshwaren drove for CT Motorsport in round 4.

=== Formula Masters China ===
Year	Car	Drivers	Races	Wins	Poles	F/Laps	Podiums	Points	D.C.	T.C.
2011	Tatuus FA010	(China) David Zhu	4	0	0	0	1	39	8th	N/A
2011	Tatuus FA010	(Malaysia) Natasha Seatter	2	0	0	0	0	18	13th	N/A
2011	Tatuus FA010	(Malaysia) Aaron Chang Mun Shien	4	0	0	0	0	18	14th	N/A
2011	Tatuus FA010	(Australia) Jordan Oon	2	0	0	0	0	7	21st	N/A
2012	Tatuus FA010	(Italy) Antonio Giovinazzi	18	6	7	6	13	229	1st	1st
2012	Tatuus FA010	(India) Parth Ghorpade	18	3	1	2	8	150	3rd	1st
2012	Tatuus FA010	(Indonesia) Sean Gelael	18	1	1	2	6	132	4th	1st
2012	Tatuus FA010	(Belgium) Sami Luka	6	0	0	0	1	24	11th	1st
2012	Tatuus FA010	(Singapore) Sean Hudspeth	3	0	0	0	0	7	17th	1st
2012	Tatuus FA010	(Indonesia) Robin Tato	6	0	0	0	0	1	19th	1st
2012	Tatuus FA010	(China) Yuan Bo	3	0	0	0	0	0	NC	1st
2013	Tatuus FA010	(Hong Kong) Matthew Solomon	18	0	0	1	4	128	5th	2nd
2013	Tatuus FA010	(Thailand) Tanart Sathienthirakul	12	1	3	0	6	115	7th	2nd
2013	Tatuus FA010	(China) Pu Jun Jin	18	0	0	0	0	45	8th	2nd
2013	Tatuus FA010	(Italy) Andrea Reggiani	9	0	0	0	0	1	19th	2nd
2013	Tatuus FA010	(Macau) Wing Chung Chang	3	0	0	0	0	0	NC	2nd
2014	Tatuus FA010	(Hong Kong) Matthew Solomon	18	5	2	6	12	187	2nd	2nd
2014	Tatuus FA010	(China) Yuan Bo	18	0	1	1	1	53	8th	2nd
2014	Tatuus FA010	(China) Pu Jun Jin	18	0	0	0	0	29	14th	2nd
2014	Tatuus FA010	(Singapore) Sean Hudspeth	8	0	0	0	0	23	15th	2nd
2014	Tatuus FA010	(China) Hua Miao	18	0	0	0	0	4	21st	2nd
2014	Tatuus FA010	(Australia) Aidan Read	3	0	0	0	0	0	24th	2nd
2014	Tatuus FA010	(Hong Kong) Dominic Tjia	3	0	0	0	0	0	25th	2nd
2015	Tatuus FA010	(Australia) Aidan Read	18	0	0	0	2	115	5th	3rd
2015	Tatuus FA010	(Singapore) Sean Hudspeth	15	0	0	0	0	52	9th	3rd
2015	Tatuus FA010	(South Korea) Kim Jeong Tae	15	0	0	0	0	19	14th	3rd
2015	Tatuus FA010	(Philippines) Asuka Muratomi	3	0	1	0	0	4	18th	3rd
2015	Tatuus FA010	(China) Hua Miao	6	0	0	0	0	2	21st	3rd
2015	Tatuus FA010	(Hong Kong) William Lok	6	0	0	0	0	0	23rd	3rd
2015	Tatuus FA010	(Hong Kong) Sam Lok	1	0	0	0	0	0	25th	3rd
2015	Tatuus FA010	(Philippines) Takeru Muratomi	2	0	0	0	0	0	NC	3rd
2016	Tatuus FA010	(Australia) Aidan Read	16	9	2	9	13	186	2nd	N/A
2017	Tatuus FA010	(Singapore) Danial Frost	17	1	4	3	10	166	3rd	N/A
2017	Tatuus FA010	(Australia) Kurt Hill	18	0	1	1	2	82	7th	N/A
2017	Tatuus FA010	(Malaysia) Isyraf Danish	8	0	1	1	0	23	12th	N/A
2017	Tatuus FA010	(Malaysia) Nazim Azman	3	0	0	0	0	4	15th	N/A
2017	Tatuus FA010	(China) Liu Zexuan	3	0	0	0	0	2	17th	N/A
2017	Tatuus FA010	(Philippines) Angie King	3	0	0	0	0	0	19th	N/A

=== 24 Hours of Daytona ===
Year	Entrant	No.	Car	Drivers	Class	Laps	Pos.	Class Pos.
2021	(Philippines) RWR-Eurasia	51	Ligier JS P217	(United States) Austin Dillon (Germany) Sven Müller (United States) Cody Ware (Turkey) Salih Yoluç	LMP2	778	10th	4th

=== 24 Hours of Le Mans ===
Year	Entrant	No.	Car	Drivers	Class	Laps	Pos.	Class Pos.
2016	(Philippines) Eurasia Motorsport	33	Oreca 05-Nissan	(Netherlands) Nick de Bruijn (France) Tristan Gommendy (China) Pu Junjin	LMP2	348	9th	5th
2017	(Philippines) Eurasia Motorsport	33	Ligier JS P217-Gibson	(France) Erik Maris (France) Jacques Nicolet (France) Pierre Nicolet	LMP2	341	15th	13th
2018	(Philippines) Eurasia Motorsport	44	Ligier JS P217-Gibson	(Italy) Andrea Bertolini (Sweden) Niclas Jönsson (United States) Tracy Krohn	LMP2	334	NC	NC
2020	(Philippines) Eurasia Motorsport	35	Ligier JS P217-Gibson	(Australia) Nick Foster (Spain) Roberto Merhi (Japan) Nobuya Yamanaka	LMP2	351	18th	14th
2021	(Philippines) Racing Team India Eurasia	74	Ligier JS P217-Gibson	(Belgium) Tom Cloet (Australia) John Corbett (United Kingdom) James Winslow	LMP2 (Pro-Am)	338	28th	7th

== Timeline ==
Current series
TCR Asia Series	2019, 2025–present
TCR World Tour	2025–present
Former series
Asian Formula Three Championship	2002–2008
JK Racing Asia Series	2003–2012
Formula V6 Asia	2006–2007
GT Asia Series	2011–2012, 2014
Formula Masters China	2011–2017
Asian Le Mans Series	2014–2020
European Le Mans Series	2015–2016
24 Hours of Le Mans	2016–2018, 2020–2021
FRD LMP3 Series	2017–2018
GT World Challenge Asia	2017–2018
Asian Formula Renault Series	2018
China Endurance Championship	2018
IMSA SportsCar Championship	2021
