= 2014–15 MRF Challenge Formula 2000 Championship =

Auto racing championship of India

2014–15 MRF Challenge

Seasons
- ← 2013–14 2015–16 →

The 2014–2015 MRF Challenge Formula 2000 Championship was the third running of the MRF Challenge Formula 2000 Championship. The championship commenced on 17 October 2014 in Losail International Circuit, Qatar and finished on 25 January 2015 in Madras Motor Racing Track, India. The series consisted of 12 races, spread across 3 meetings.

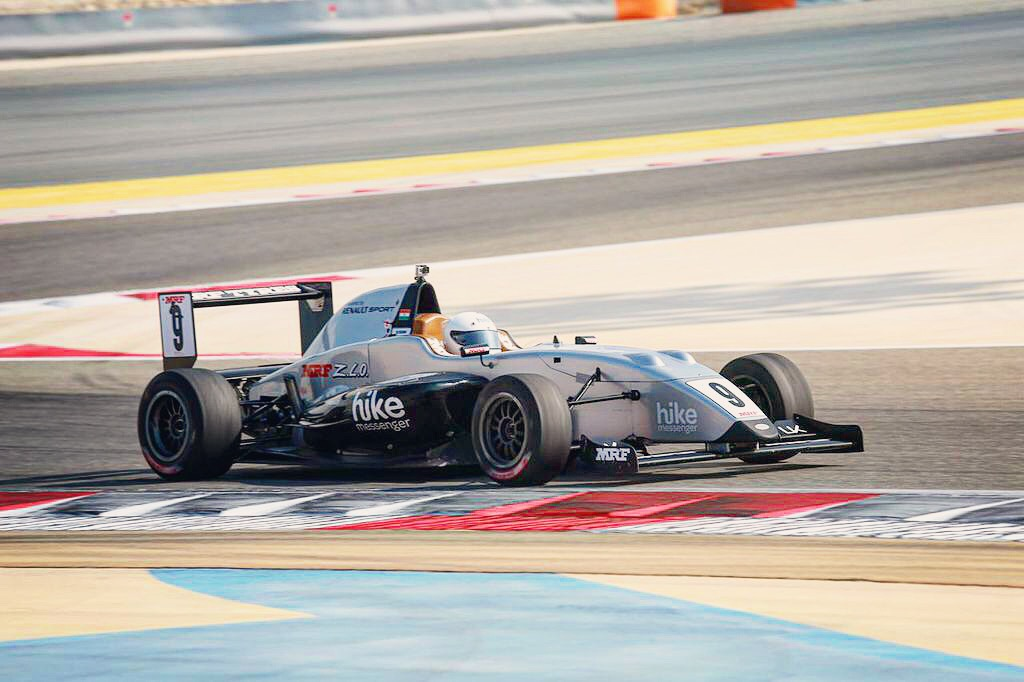
Lee Keshav on track at the Bahrain International Circuit

With four victories – two at Losail and two in Madras – and top-five finishes in every race, Toby Sowery finished the season as champion. Sowery finished 47 points clear of his next closest competitor Ryan Cullen, who was a three-time race winner, winning a pair of races in Bahrain and one in Madras. Third place in the championship went to the best placed home driver Raj Bharath, who was a race winner at Losail; he finished 26 points in arrears of Cullen. Four other drivers won races during the season; Tarun Reddy won the other race to be held at Losail, Struan Moore and Mathias Lauda each won races in Bahrain, and Oscar King won the season's final race, in Madras.

== Drivers ==
Freddie Hunt, son of 1976 Formula One champion James Hunt and Mathias Lauda, son of 1975, 1977 and 1984 Formula One champion Niki Lauda both competed in the series.

No.	Driver	Rounds
1	(Austria) Mathias Lauda	1–2
2	(India) Tarun Reddy	All
3	(Australia) Dylan Young	All
4	(France) Christophe Mariot	2
5	(India) Raj Bharath	All
6	(Brazil) Pedro Cardoso	1
7	(United Kingdom) Toby Sowery	All
8	(United Kingdom) Ryan Cullen	All
9	(India) Lee Keshav	All
10	(India) Vikash Anand	1–2
11	(United Kingdom) Freddie Hunt	All
12	(Brazil) Vinicius Papareli	All
15	(India) Advait Deodhar	2
16	(United Kingdom) Laura Tillett	All
17	(Russia) Nikita Mazepin	1
18	(South Africa) Kyle Mitchell	1–2
19	(United States) Camren Kaminsky	2
20	(United Kingdom) Struan Moore	2
21	(Hong Kong) Matthew Solomon	3
23	(United Kingdom) Jordan Albert	3
35	(India) Mahaveer Raghunathan	3
50	(Brazil) Gustavo Myasava	3
61	(Germany) Sebastian Balthasar	3
77	(United Kingdom) Oscar King	3

== Race calendar and results ==
The second round in Bahrain was held in support of the FIA World Endurance Championship.

Round		Circuit	Date	Pole position	Fastest lap	Winning driver
2014
1	R1	(Qatar) Losail International Circuit, Lusail	17 October	(United Kingdom) Toby Sowery	(United Kingdom) Toby Sowery	(United Kingdom) Toby Sowery
1	R2	(Qatar) Losail International Circuit, Lusail	17 October		(United Kingdom) Toby Sowery	(India) Tarun Reddy
1	R3	(Qatar) Losail International Circuit, Lusail	18 October		(South Africa) Kyle Mitchell	(India) Raj Bharath
1	R4	(Qatar) Losail International Circuit, Lusail	18 October		(India) Raj Bharath	(United Kingdom) Toby Sowery
2	R1	Bahrain International Circuit, Sakhir	14 November	(India) Raj Bharath	(United Kingdom) Ryan Cullen	(United Kingdom) Ryan Cullen
2	R2	Bahrain International Circuit, Sakhir	14 November		(United States) Camren Kaminsky	(United Kingdom) Struan Moore
2	R3	Bahrain International Circuit, Sakhir	15 November		(South Africa) Kyle Mitchell	(United Kingdom) Ryan Cullen
2	R4	Bahrain International Circuit, Sakhir	15 November		(United Kingdom) Ryan Cullen	(Austria) Mathias Lauda
2015
3	R1	(India) Madras Motor Racing Track, Chennai	24 January	(Germany) Sebastian Balthasar	(United Kingdom) Oscar King	(United Kingdom) Toby Sowery
3	R2	(India) Madras Motor Racing Track, Chennai	24 January		(United Kingdom) Toby Sowery	(United Kingdom) Toby Sowery
3	R3	(India) Madras Motor Racing Track, Chennai	25 January		(United Kingdom) Ryan Cullen	(United Kingdom) Ryan Cullen
3	R4	(India) Madras Motor Racing Track, Chennai	25 January		(United Kingdom) Oscar King	(United Kingdom) Oscar King

== Championship standings ==
Pos.	Driver	LOS (Qatar)				BHR (Bahrain)				MMR (India)				Points
1	(United Kingdom) Toby Sowery	1	3	3	1	5	2	3	4	1	1	2	5	221
2	(United Kingdom) Ryan Cullen	2	6	4	3	1	3	1	8	10†	5	1	4	174
3	(India) Raj Bharath	9	7	1	2	2	4	4	3	5	6	4	7	148
4	(South Africa) Kyle Mitchell	3	5	2	7	3	6	2	2					112
5	(India) Tarun Reddy	6	1	7	5	Ret	7	Ret	Ret	2	4	Ret	9	87
6	(Austria) Mathias Lauda	4	4	6	9	15†	8	6	1					71
7	(United Kingdom) Oscar King									9†	3	3	1	61
8	(Brazil) Gustavo Myasava									3	2	5	3	58
9	(United Kingdom) Struan Moore					4	1	Ret	6					45
10	(Russia) Nikita Mazepin	5	2	Ret	6									36
11	(Australia) Dylan Young	8	11	8	10	6	5	7	Ret	Ret	10	9	Ret	36
12	(Hong Kong) Matthew Solomon									Ret	8	6	2	30
13	(Brazil) Vinícius Papareli	Ret	10	9	8	10	11	5	Ret	6	Ret	11	12	29
14	(Brazil) Pedro Cardoso	11	8	5	4									26
15	(United Kingdom) Jordan Albert									4	12	7	6	26
16	(United States) Camren Kaminsky					12	9	8	5					18
17	(United Kingdom) Laura Tillett	12	13	11	12	8	12	Ret	7	Ret	Ret	8	8	18
18	(India) Vikash Anand	7	9	13	13	7	Ret	Ret	9					16
19	(India) Lee Keshav	11	14	12	11	13	13	9	Ret	7	9	10	13	10
20	(Germany) Sebastian Balthasar									**Ret**	7	Ret	11	8
21	(India) Mahaveer Raghunathan									8	11	DNS	10	5
22	(United Kingdom) Freddie Hunt	10	12	10	Ret	9	10	Ret	Ret	Ret	Ret	12	Ret	5
23	(France) Christophe Mariot					14	15	11	10					1
24	(India) Advait Deodhar					11	14	10	Ret					1
Pos.	Driver	LOS (Qatar)				BHR (Bahrain)				MMR (India)				Points

Colour	Result
Gold	Winner
Silver	Second place
Bronze	Third place
Green	Points classification
Blue	Non-points classification
Blue	Non-classified finish (NC)
Purple	Retired, not classified (Ret)
Red	Did not qualify (DNQ)
Red	Did not pre-qualify (DNPQ)
Black	Disqualified (DSQ)
White	Did not start (DNS)
White	Withdrew (WD)
White	Race cancelled (C)
Blank	Did not practice (DNP)
Blank	Did not arrive (DNA)
Blank	Excluded (EX)

**Bold** – Pole
Italics – Fastest Lap
