= 2013–14 MRF Challenge Formula 2000 Championship =

Auto racing championship of India

2013–14 MRF Challenge

Seasons
- ← 2012–13 2014–15 →

The 2013–2014 MRF Challenge Formula 2000 Championship was the second running of the MRF Challenge Formula 2000 Championship. The series consisted of 13 races, spread across 4 meetings began on 26 October 2013 at the Buddh International Circuit, supporting the 2013 Indian Grand Prix and ended on 16 February 2014.

Rupert Svendsen-Cook claimed the championship title, after successfully appealing a penalty that was given to him, at the final round of the season at the Madras Motor Racing Track. Svendsen-Cook had been given a 30-second penalty for pushing Tio Ellinas off the track, which had allowed Ellinas to provisionally claim the championship title. This penalty was overturned in March, allowing Svendsen-Cook's advantage of two points to stand.

== Drivers ==
No.	Driver	Rounds
1	(India) Narain Karthikeyan	4
2	(India) Parth Ghorpade	1–2
2	(India) Tarun Reddy	3
3	(Japan) Yudai Jinkawa	1–2
3	(Japan) Kotaro Sakurai	3
4	(India) Ashwin Sundar	1
5	(Australia) Dylan Young	All
7	(Republic of Ireland) Ryan Cullen	All
8	(Brazil) Renan Guerra	1–3
9	(Australia) Sam Brabham	All
10	(India) Vikash Anand	All
11	(Israel) Bar Baruch	1
11	(United Kingdom) Oscar King	4
12	(France) Arthur Pic	1–3
15	(Bahrain) Salman Al-Khalifa	1–3
16	(United Kingdom) Sean Walkinshaw	1
16	(India) Gaurav Gill	4
17	(Bahrain) Abdulla Al-Thawadi	2–4
18	(France) Christophe Mariot	1–3
18	(United Kingdom) Max Marshall	4
20	(India) Raj Bharath	2–4
21	(United Kingdom) Rupert Svendsen-Cook	All
22	(Spain) Carmen Jordá	2–3
26	(United Kingdom) Laura Tillett	All
28	(Cyprus) Tio Ellinas	All
29	(Belgium) Sam Dejonghe	All
30	(Japan) Shinya Michimi	1–3
31	(United Kingdom) Harry Tincknell	All
34	(United States) Camren Kaminsky	2–3
37	(United Kingdom) Benjamin Anderson	4
117	(Brazil) Gustavo Myasava	4

== Race calendar and results ==
Round		Circuit	Date	Pole position	Fastest lap	Winning driver
2013
1	R1	(India) Buddh International Circuit, Noida	26 October	(France) Arthur Pic	(France) Arthur Pic	(France) Arthur Pic
1	R2	(India) Buddh International Circuit, Noida	27 October		(Cyprus) Tio Ellinas	(United Kingdom) Rupert Svendsen-Cook
2	R1	Bahrain International Circuit, Sakhir	29 November	(Cyprus) Tio Ellinas	(France) Arthur Pic	(United Kingdom) Rupert Svendsen-Cook
2	R2	Bahrain International Circuit, Sakhir	29 November	Race cancelled due to bad light		
2	R3	Bahrain International Circuit, Sakhir	30 November		(France) Arthur Pic	(France) Arthur Pic
2	R4	Bahrain International Circuit, Sakhir	30 November		(Cyprus) Tio Ellinas	(Cyprus) Tio Ellinas
3	R1	Bahrain International Circuit, Sakhir	20 December	(Cyprus) Tio Ellinas	(Cyprus) Tio Ellinas	(United Kingdom) Rupert Svendsen-Cook
3	R2	Bahrain International Circuit, Sakhir	20 December		(Cyprus) Tio Ellinas	(Cyprus) Tio Ellinas
3	R3	Bahrain International Circuit, Sakhir	21 December		(France) Arthur Pic	(Cyprus) Tio Ellinas
3	R4	Bahrain International Circuit, Sakhir	21 December		(United Kingdom) Rupert Svendsen-Cook	(United Kingdom) Rupert Svendsen-Cook
2014
4	R1	(India) Madras Motor Racing Track, Chennai	14 February	(Cyprus) Tio Ellinas	(United Kingdom) Rupert Svendsen-Cook	(United Kingdom) Rupert Svendsen-Cook
4	R2	(India) Madras Motor Racing Track, Chennai	14 February		(Cyprus) Tio Ellinas	(Belgium) Sam Dejonghe
4	R3	(India) Madras Motor Racing Track, Chennai	16 February		(United Kingdom) Harry Tincknell	(United Kingdom) Rupert Svendsen-Cook
4	R4	(India) Madras Motor Racing Track, Chennai	16 February		(Cyprus) Tio Ellinas	(India) Narain Karthikeyan
4	R5	(India) Madras Motor Racing Track, Chennai	16 February		(Belgium) Sam Dejonghe	(Belgium) Sam Dejonghe

== Championship standings ==
Scoring system

Position	1st	2nd	3rd	4th	5th	6th	7th	8th	9th	10th	Pole	FL
Points	25	18	15	12	10	8	6	4	2	1	2	2

Reverse grid Race

Position	1st	2nd	3rd	4th	5th	6th	7th	8th	FL
Points	15	12	10	8	6	4	2	1	2

Drivers' standings

Pos	Driver	BIC		BHR				BHR				CHE				Points
1	(United Kingdom) Rupert Svendsen-Cook	5	1	1	C	5	4	1	Ret	2	1	1	3	1	3	200
2	(Cyprus) Tio Ellinas	2	3	3	C	2	1	2	1	1	10	2	Ret	5	2	182
3	(France) Arthur Pic	1	5	2	C	1	2	3	2	3	Ret					138
