= Guangdong International Circuit =

Motorsport track in China

- Full Circuit (2009–present)
- Location: Sihui, Zhaoqing, Guangdong Province, People's Republic of China
- Coordinates: 23°16′13″N 112°49′05″E
- FIA Grade: 3 (Note: Guangdong International Circuit's Grade 3 license expired on 7 February 2026.)
- Broke ground: December 2008; 17 years ago
- Opened: 5 December 2009; 16 years ago
- Construction cost: USD 50 million
- Architect: Qiming Yao
- Major events: Former: Hong Kong Touring Car Championship (2015–2018, 2023–2024); China Touring Car Championship (2009–2019); TCR China (2017–2018); Formula Pilota China (2011–2012); Asian Touring Car Series (2011); Formula BMW Pacific (2010)

Full Circuit (2009–present)
- Length: 2.824 km (1.755 mi)
- Turns: 13
- Race lap record: 1:14.318 ( (India) Parth Ghorpade, Tatuus FA010, 2012, Formula Abarth)

Guangdong International Circuit is a motor sport facility located at Da Wang, Sihui, in Zhaoqing city in China, approximately 45 minutes by car from Guangzhou. Designed by Qiming Yao, it is the second permanent motor sport facility in Guangdong, China, after Zhuhai International Circuit. The Guangdong International Circuit completed in 2009.

== Grading ==
The circuit holds an International FIA Grade "III" license and can hold F3, A1GP and WTCC races.

== Layout ==
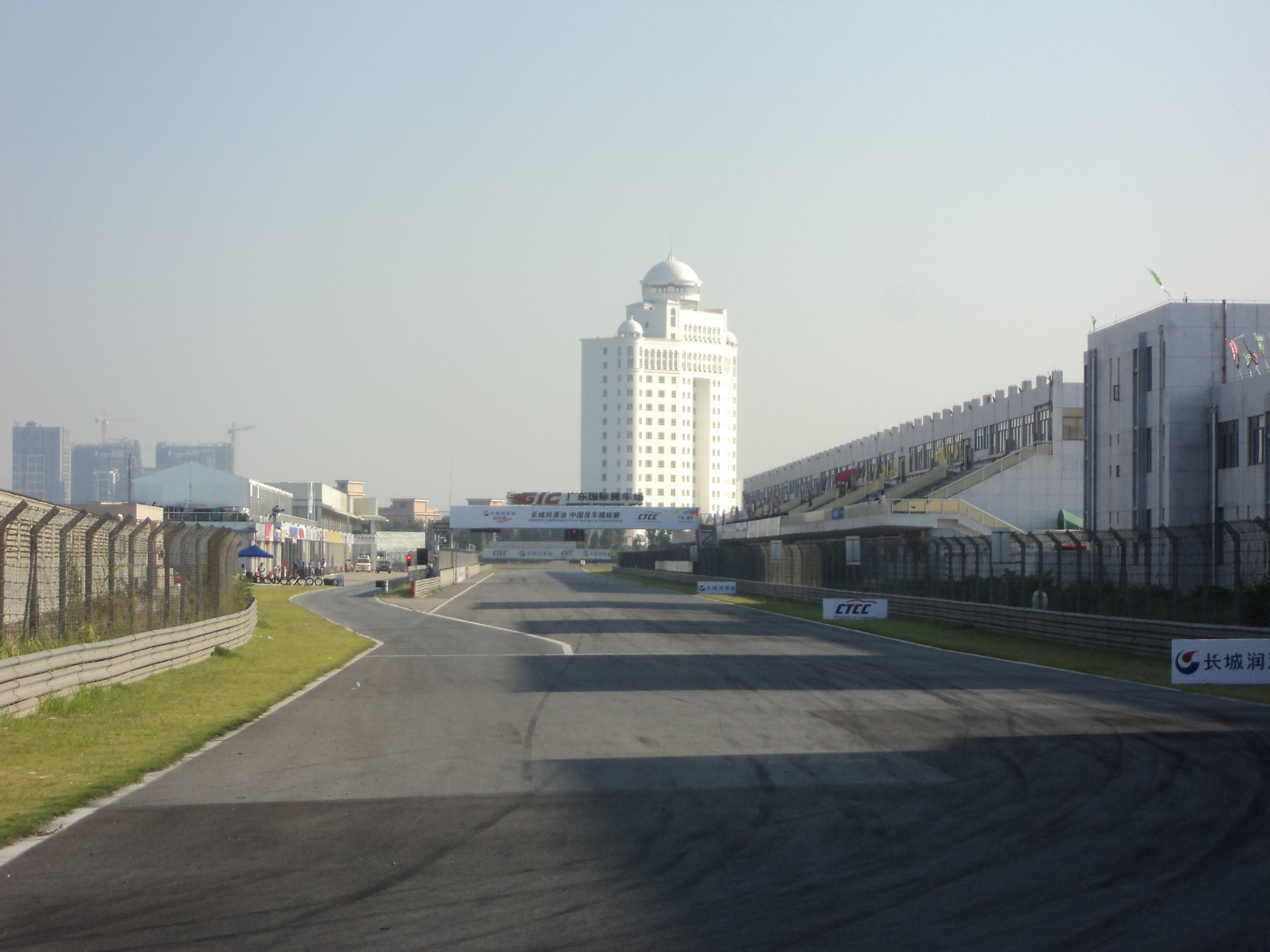
Main straight of the Guangdong International Circuit

The circuit is 2.824 km (1.755 mi) long with a 0.718 km (0.446 mi) long straight, there are 5 left and 8 right hand turns running clockwise.

== Events ==
The circuit hosted the China Touring Car Championship in December 2009 as its opening event.

It was announced on December 12, 2010, that the circuit also to host the China round of the 2011 WTCC season. However, on September 30, 2011, was announced that the race would be hosted by the Shanghai Tianma Circuit.

== Lap records ==
As of December 2017, the fastest official race lap records at the Guangdong International Circuit are listed as:

Category	Time	Driver	Vehicle	Event
Full Circuit (2009–present): 2.824 km (1.755 mi)
Formula Abarth	1:14.318	Parth Ghorpade	Tatuus FA010	2012 Guangdong Formula Pilota China round
Formula BMW	1:20.540	Óscar Tunjo	Mygale FB02	2010 Guangdong Formula BMW Pacific round
TCR Touring Car	1:20.785	Alex Hui	Volkswagen Golf GTI TCR	2017 Guangdong TCR China round
