= Formula Masters China =

Former Single-Seater Racing Championship

- Category: Single seaters
- Country: Asia
- Inaugural season: 2011
- Folded: 2017
- Drivers: 19 (2017)
- Teams: 5 (2017)
- Constructors: Tatuus
- Engine suppliers: Volkswagen
- Tyre suppliers: Giti Tire
- Last Drivers' champion: (New Zealand) Taylor Cockerton
- Last Teams' champion: (Philippines) Cebu Pacific Air by PRT
- Official website: Formula Masters China Series

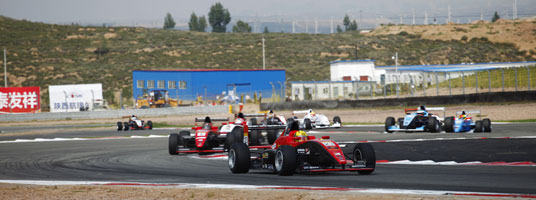
Formula Pilota China racing at Ordos International Circuit.

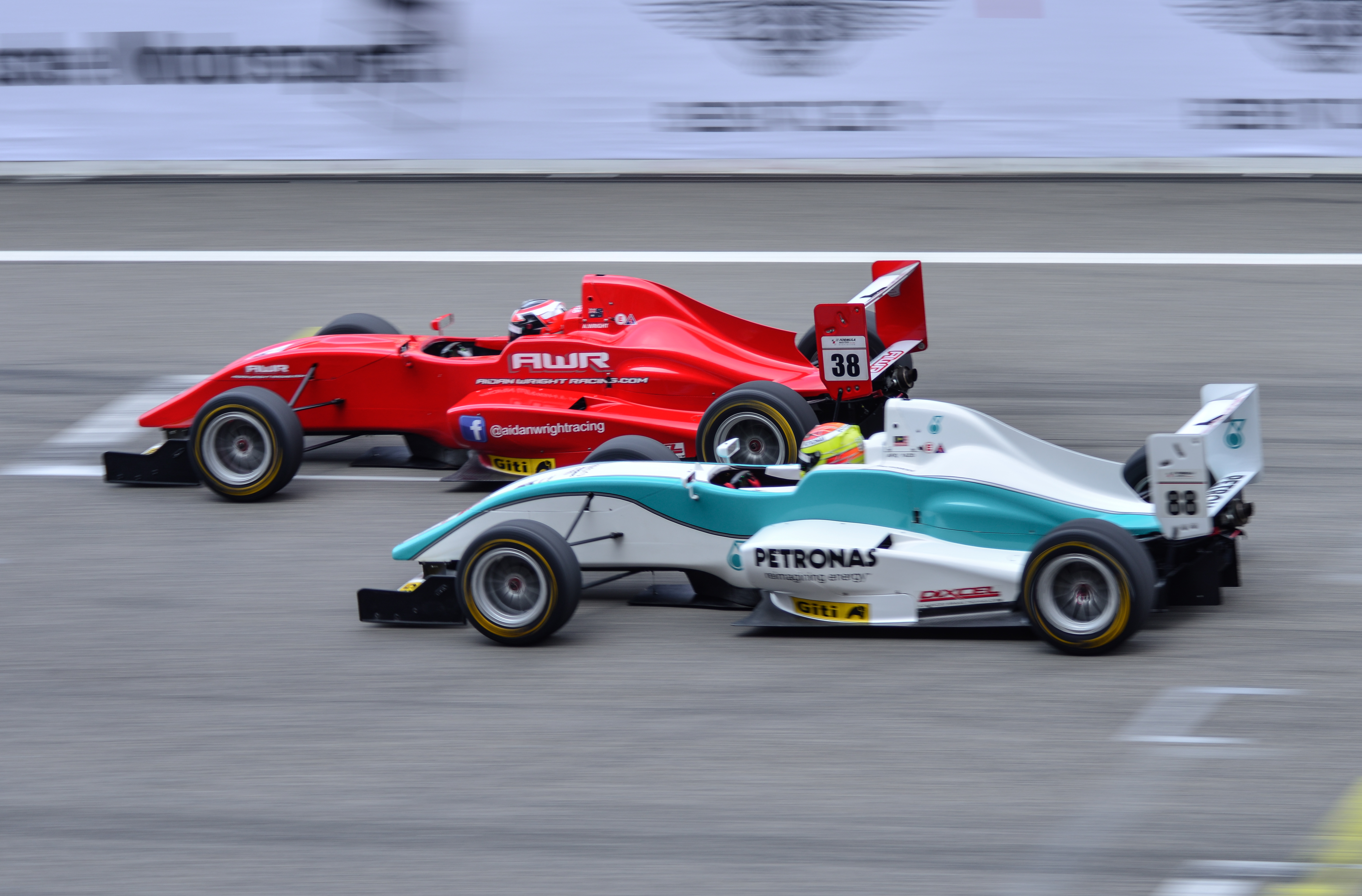
Racing in Shanghai in 2013.

Formula Masters China, FMCS (Chinese: 青年冠军方程式系列赛) (previously known as Formula Pilota China), was a single-seater racing series based in Asia. The series was created in 2011 after the success of the Formula Abarth championship that was created a year before.

== Event schedule ==
Each event in the championship is normally run to a three-day schedule. It comprises two free practice sessions on the first day, one qualifying session and 45–55 km or 25-minute race on the second day, and a 45–55 km or 25-minute race on the third day. The grid for the second race is determined by the fastest lap in the first race; if drivers set equal times, priority will be given to driver who set the time first.

== Circuits ==
Events have been held predominantly on Chinese circuits at Guangdong, Ordos International Circuit, Shanghai, and Shanghai Tianma, as well as Sepang and Kuala Lumpur in Malaysia.

== Formula Pilota China Cars ==
All the teams in Formula Pilota China use the same Tatuus FA010 chassis and a 1.4 litre FPT engine.

Specifications:

- Chassis: Tatuus FA010 Carbon composite monocoque FIA F3-2010 safety homologated
- Dimension: 2650mm x 1490mm x 1455mm
- Weight: 525 kg
- Engine: FPT 414TF
- Displacement: 1.400cc
- Power output: 180 hp
- Fuel: Premier, FIA FT3 fuel cell ethanol compatible
- Gearbox: Sadev sequential six-speed gearbox — LSD differential.
- Front Suspension: Double wishbone with pushrods
- Rear Suspension: Double wishbone with pushrods
- Shock Absorbers: ORA
- Brake Disc: AP cast iron ventilated discs, 278mm x 16mm.
- Wheel Rims: ATS, Front 9x13", Rear 10,5x13"centre-bolt aluminium.
- Tyres: GitiCompete GTR1 racing slicks and wet weather tyres
- Fuel Tank: 45 litres

== Points ==
After each race the points will be awarded to eligible drivers listed as classified finishers as follows:

2011

Points
1st	2nd	3rd	4th	5th	6th	7th	8th	9th	10th
20	15	12	10	8	6	4	3	2	1

Points are awarded after the completion of any Judicial or Technical procedures and after the Stewards have declared the results final. Only the best eleven race results are retained, any other points being discarded.

2012–2014

Position	1st	2nd	3rd	4th	5th	6th	7th	8th	9th	10th	PP
Race 1&3	20	15	12	10	8	6	4	3	2	1	1
Race 2	12	10	8	6	4	3	2	1	0	0	0

== Champions ==
Season	Champion	Second	Third	Secondary Class Champion	Team Champion
2011	(Czech Republic) Mathéo Tuscher	(Angola) Luís Sá Silva	(Indonesia) Dustin Sofyan	A: (Indonesia) Dustin Sofyan	not awarded
2012	(Italy) Antonio Giovinazzi	(United Kingdom) Dan Wells	(India) Parth Ghorpade	A: (India) Parth Ghorpade	(Philippines) Eurasia Motorsport
2013	(Australia) Aidan Wright	(Malaysia) Afiq Yazid	(Malaysia) Akash Nandy	C: (China) Pu Jun Jin	(Malaysia) Meritus GP
2014	(New Zealand) James Munro	(Hong Kong) Matt Solomon	(United Kingdom) Dan Wells	not awarded	(Hong Kong) Cebu Pacific Air by KCMG
2015	(Estonia) Martin Rump	(Australia) Jake Parsons	(Australia) Nick Rowe	not awarded	(Hong Kong) Cebu Pacific Air by KCMG
2016	(Germany) Philip Hamprecht	(Australia) Aidan Read	(China) Zheng Shangguan	M: (Japan) Takashi Hata; C: (China) Zheng Shangguan	(Hong Kong) Absolute Racing
2017	(New Zealand) Taylor Cockerton	(China) Daniel Lu	(Singapore) Danial Frost	not awarded	not awarded
