= Tatuus FA010 =

Italian race car

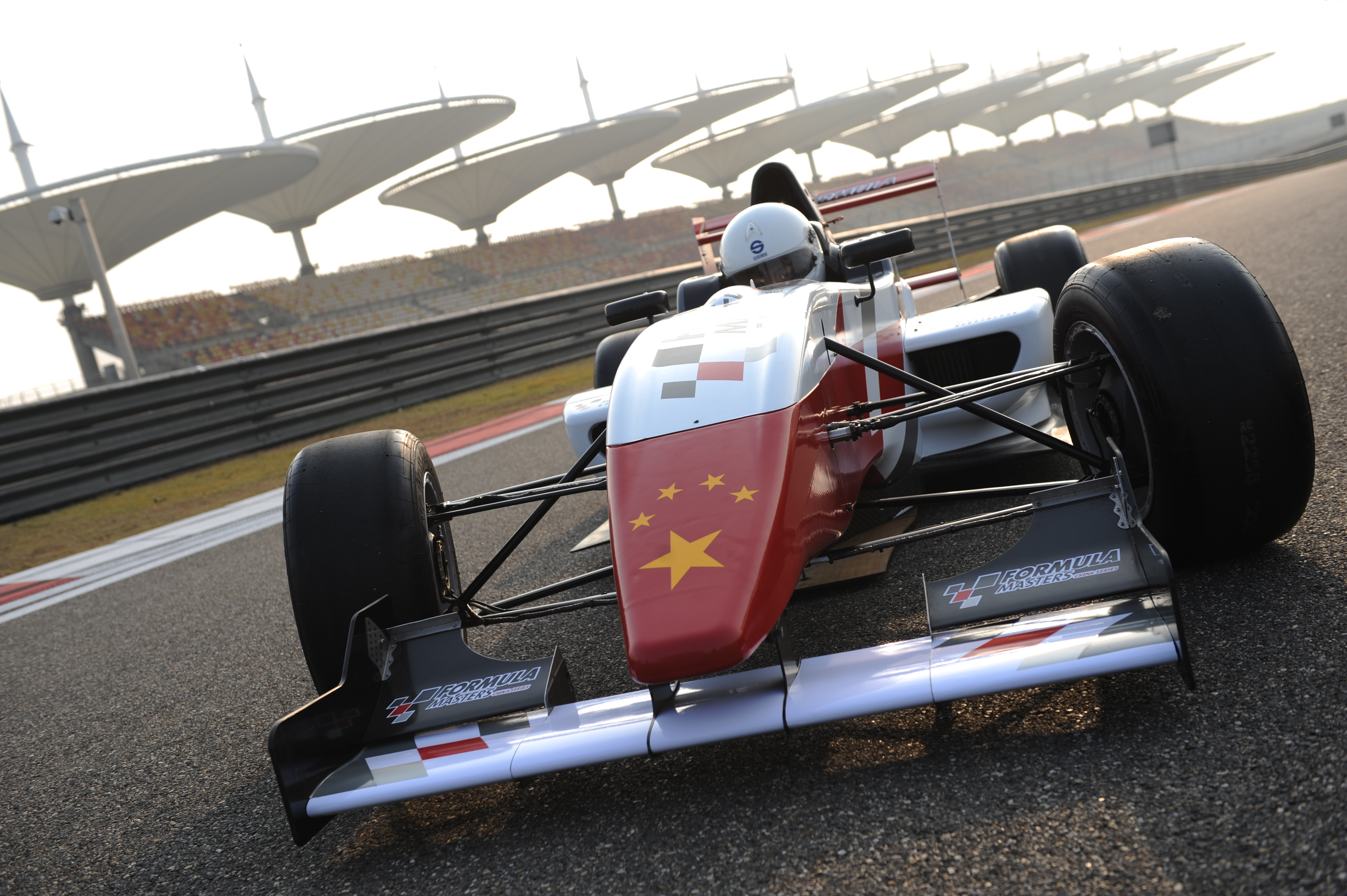
- Category: Formula 3/Formula 4
- Constructor: Tatuus

Technical specifications
- Chassis: Carbon-fiber monocoque, fiberglass body
- Suspension (front): Push-rod with twin non-adjustable shock absorbers, adjustable anti-roll bar and third element
- Suspension (rear): Push-rod with twin non-adjustable shock absorbers, adjustable anti-roll bar and third element
- Height: 950 mm (37 in)
- Axle track: 1,490 mm (59 in) (front); 1,455 mm (57 in) (rear)
- Wheelbase: 2,650 mm (104 in)
- Engine: Abarth FT-J/Autotecnica 1.4 L (85 cu in) DOHC inline-4 turbocharged, longitudinally mounted in a mid-engined, rear-wheel drive layout VW 2.0 L (122 cu in) DOHC inline-4 naturally-aspirated, longitudinally mounted in a mid-engined, rear-wheel drive
- Transmission: SADEV 6-speed semi-automatic sequential gearbox
- Power: 180–200 hp (134–149 kW); 250 N⋅m (184 lb⋅ft)
- Weight: 450–525 kg (992–1,157 lb) including driver
- Fuel: Various unleaded control fuel
- Lubricants: Various
- Brakes: AP Racing 4-piston calipers Ventilated aluminum brake discs
- Tyres: Various

Competition history
- Debut: 2010

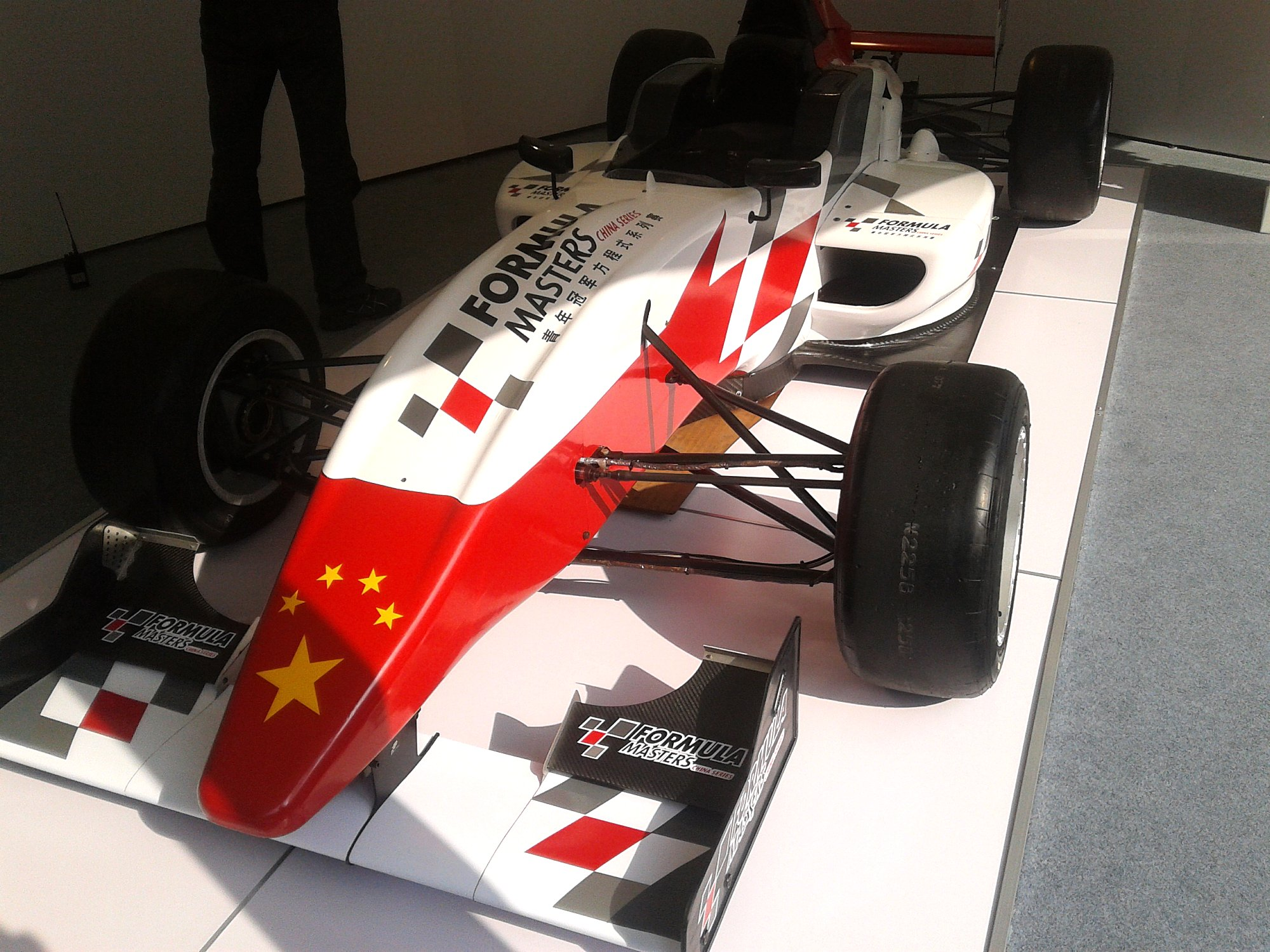
2013 Formula Masters China tatuus chassis

The Tatuus FA010 is an open-wheel race car, designed, developed, and built by Italian chassis manufacturer Tatuus, for the Formula Abarth series, and later the Formula Masters China series, between 2010 and 2011.
