= Ordos International Circuit =

Motorsport race track in China

- Full Circuit (2010–present)
- Location: Ordos City, Inner Mongolia, China
- Coordinates: 39°37′19″N 109°52′15″E
- FIA Grade: 2 (Note: Ordos International Circuit's Grade 2 license expired on 7 March 2026.)
- Opened: 2010
- Major events: Current: TCR China (2025–present); China Touring Car Championship (2010–2013, 2025–present); Former: Porsche Carrera Cup Asia (2011–2013); Audi R8 LMS Cup (2012–2013); Formula Pilota China (2011–2013); Lamborghini Super Trofeo Asia (2012); FIA GT1 World Championship (2011); Superleague Formula (2010)

Full Circuit (2010–present)
- Length: 3.751 km (2.331 mi)
- Turns: 18
- Race lap record: 1:30.021 ( (United Kingdom) Ben Hanley, Panoz DP09, 2010, SF)

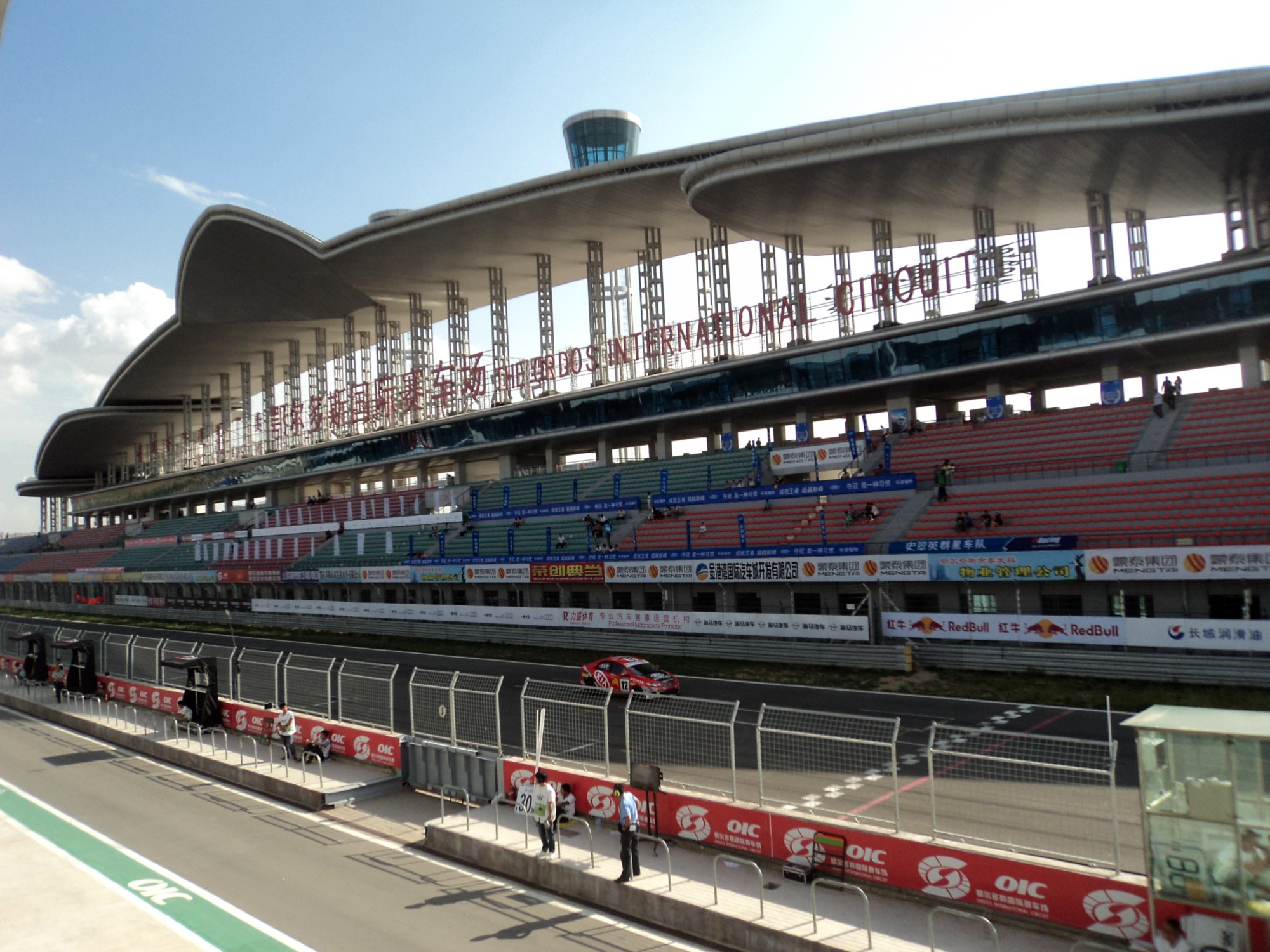
The main grandstand at Ordos International Circuit.

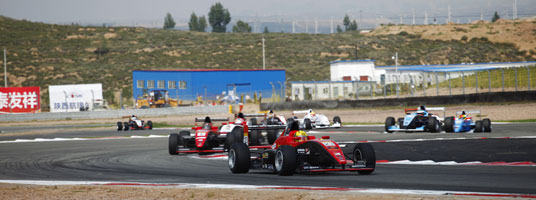
Formula Pilota China race at Ordos International Circuit.

Ordos International Circuit (Chinese: 鄂尔多斯国际赛车场), built in 2010, is a motorsport facility located in Kangbashi New Area, Ordos City, Inner Mongolia, China. It hosted a round of the China Touring Car Championship, Scirocco Cup China and Superleague Formula in 2010. The circuit is 3.751 km (2.331 mi) long with 18 corners and resembles a galloping horse.

== History ==
Orodos International Circuit opened in 2010 and is the first track that was designed and developed entirely by the Chinese. Taking its inspiration from the local culture, the unusual track layout mimics the shape of a horse dashing, while its main grandstand features a roofline in the shape of a swooping eagle.

Completed in summer 2010, the circuit received FIA grade 2 certification that September. Allowing it to host single seater categories below contemporary Formula One, as well as prototype racing cars.

Jiang Tengyi was the first driver to win a race at Ordos, when he won round 1 of the China Touring Car Championship at the wheel of a Ford Focus. Ben Hanley became the first driver to win an international race at Ordos on 3 October 2010 when he won the first of two Superleague Formula races held here for Olympiacos.

Ordos was included in the 2011 FIA GT1 World Championship calendar by the FIA on 10 December 2010. Marc VDS Racing's Maxime Martin and Frédéric Makowiecki secured their third qualifying race victory of the year. The team then secured its first championship race win in the World GT1 series as Maxime Martin and Frédéric Makowiecki held JRM Nissan duo Richard Westbrook and Peter Dumbreck at bay.

Since then international motorsport has ventured elsewhere in China, but Ordos continues to hold national and regional races, supplemented by driver training and manufacturer test days and new product launches.

== Lap records ==
As of August 2026, the fastest official race lap records at the Ordos International Circuit are listed as:

Category	Time	Driver	Vehicle	Event
Full Circuit (2010–present): 3.751 km (2.331 mi)
Superleague Formula	1:30.021	Ben Hanley	Panoz DP09	2010 Ordos Superleague Formula round
GT1	1:38.710	Peter Dumbreck	Nissan GT-R GT1	2011 Ordos FIA GT1 round
Porsche Carrera Cup	1:45.249	Earl Bamber	Porsche 911 (991 I) GT3 Cup	2013 Ordos Porsche Carrera Cup Asia round
TCR Touring Car	1:49.732	Jason Zhang Zhi Qiang	Lynk & Co 03 TCR	2026 Ordos TCR China round
