= Laar (surname) =

Family name

Laar, van Laar, van de Laar, van der Laar is a Dutch, German, or Estonian surname. Notable people with the surname include:

- Bart van der Laar (1945–1981), Dutch music producer
- Conrad Laar (1853–1929), German chemist
- Dennis van de Laar, Dutch racing driver
- Getter Laar (born 1989), Estonian football player
- Irene van de Laar, Miss Universe Netherlands, model, actress, and TV presenter
- Johannes van Laar (1860–1938), Dutch chemist
- Louis van de Laar, Dutch politician
- Mart Laar (born 1960), Estonian politician and historian
- Roelof van Laar (born 1981), Dutch politician
- Timothy Van Laar (born 1951), American artist and writer
