= Van Laar =

Van Laar is a Dutch surname. Notable people with the surname include:

- Johannes van Laar (1860–1938), Dutch chemist
- Roelof van Laar (born 1981), Dutch politician
- Timothy Van Laar (born 1951), American artist

== See also ==
- Laar (surname)
- the Van Laar equation
