= 2013 Macau Grand Prix =

Formula Three motor race

Race details
Date	16–17 November 2013
Official name	60th Star River‧Windsor Arch Macau Grand Prix
Location	Guia Circuit, Macau
Course	Temporary street circuit 6.120 km (3.803 mi)
Distance	Qualifying Race; 10 laps, 61.200 km (38.028 mi); Main Race; 15 laps, 91.800 km (57.042 mi)
Weather	Qualifying Race: Sunny; air 23 °C (73 °F), track 39 °C (102 °F); Main Race: Sunny; air 24 °C (75 °F), track 29 °C (84 °F)
- Qualifying Race

Pole
Driver	(Italy) Raffaele Marciello	Prema Powerteam
Time	2:11.555

Fastest Lap
Driver	(Sweden) Felix Rosenqvist	GR Asia with Mücke
Time	2:12.312 (on lap 8)

Podium
First	(United Kingdom) Alex Lynn	Theodore Racing by Prema
Second	(Sweden) Felix Rosenqvist	GR Asia with Mücke
Third	(Italy) Raffaele Marciello	Prema Powerteam
- Main Race

Pole
Driver	(United Kingdom) Alex Lynn	Theodore Racing by Prema

Fastest Lap
Driver	(United Kingdom) Jordan King	Carlin
Time	2:11.547 (on lap 15)

Podium
First	(United Kingdom) Alex Lynn	Theodore Racing by Prema
Second	(Portugal) António Félix da Costa	Carlin
Third	(Brazil) Pipo Derani	Fortec Motorsport

The 2013 Macau Grand Prix (formally the 60th Star River-Windsor Arch Macau Grand Prix) was a motor race for Formula Three cars that was held on the streets of Macau on 17 November 2013. Unlike other races, such as the Masters of Formula 3, the 2013 Macau Grand Prix was not a part of any Formula Three championship, but was open to entries from all Formula Three championships. The race itself was made up of two races: a ten-lap qualifying race that decided the starting grid for the fifteen-lap main race. The 2013 race was the 60th running of the Macau Grand Prix and the 31st for Formula Three cars.

The Grand Prix was won by Theodore Racing by Prema driver Alex Lynn from pole position, having won the event's Qualification Race the previous afternoon. Lynn led every lap of the main race to take victory and became the seventh driver to win the race for Theodore Racing. Second place went to the race's defending champion António Félix da Costa, competing for Carlin, while the podium was completed by Fortec Motorsport driver Pipo Derani.

== Entry list and background ==
The Macau Grand Prix is a Formula Three race considered to be a stepping stone to higher motor racing categories such as Formula One and has been termed the territory's most prestigious international sporting event. The 2013 Macau Grand Prix was the 60th running of the event and the 31st time the race was held to Formula Three regulations. It took place on the 6.2 km (3.9 mi) 22-turn Guia Circuit on 17 November 2013 with three preceding days of practice and qualifying.

In order to compete in Macau, drivers had to compete in a Fédération Internationale de l'Automobile (FIA)-regulated championship meeting during the calendar year, in either the FIA Formula Three European Championship or one of the domestic championships, with the highest-ranked drivers in those series given priority in receiving an invitation to the meeting. Within the 28-car grid of the event, three of the four major Formula Three series were represented by their respective champion, Raffaele Marciello, the FIA Formula Three European champion, was joined in Macau by British champion Jordan King and Japanese series winner Yuichi Nakayama. German Formula Three title victor Marvin Kirchhöfer did not enter the event and so the highest-placed German series participant at Macau was fifth-placed John Bryant-Meisner. Dennis van de Laar was confirmed as a late replacement for European Formula Three driver Mitchell Gilbert at Mücke Motorsport who could not raise the necessary capital to compete in Macau due to poor results. Ed Jones and Nelson Mason, both European F3 Open Championship winners, replaced Félix Serrallés and Sandro Zeller; Serralés was replaced after his run of poor results in the European Championship.

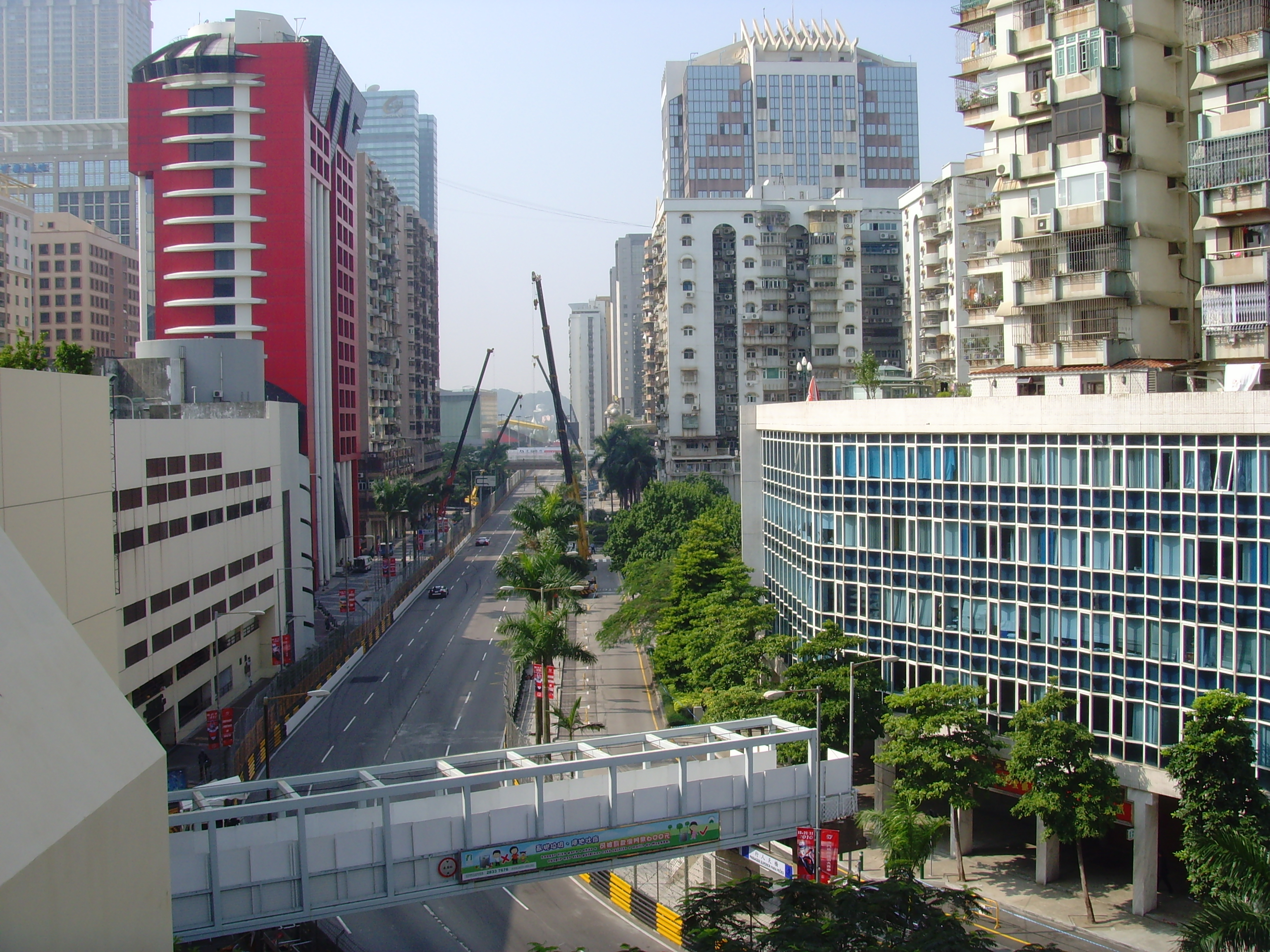
The Guia Circuit, where the race was held.

Seven drivers who mainly competed in other series outside of Formula Three in 2013 became eligible for the Macau race: GP3 Series title contender Daniil Kvyat could not attend as he was at the United States Grand Prix testing for Toro Rosso and António Félix da Costa, the defending winner of the event, replaced him. Eurocup Formula Renault 2.0 race winner Esteban Ocon and GP3 Series victor Carlos Sainz Jr. were announced among the lineup of drivers – Ocon to wait until his main series campaign had concluded before sealing his eligibility; Félix da Costa, Ocon and Sainz sealed their eligibility by competing in the MotorSport Vision Formula Three Cup, a second-tier Formula Three series in the United Kingdom, in its season-ending round at Snetterton. Three-time 2013 GP2 Series race winner Stefano Coletti and Kevin Korjus of the GP3 Series raced in the season-closing European Formula Three round at the Hockenheimring to prepare for Macau. The two other drivers who qualified for Macau were Formula Renault 3.5 Series racer Jazeman Jaafar who won two races at the Brands Hatch round of the British championship and Super GT competitor Yuhi Sekiguchi whose entry to the Masters of Formula 3 race allowed for his participation.

In April, the FIA single-seater commission president Gerhard Berger hinted to the press that the race would not have vehicles running with the more powerful 2013-specification engines from the All-Japan Formula Three championship due to a lack of car space and reliability concerns. The FIA World Motor Sport Council confirmed at a meeting at Goodwood House on 28 June that all engines installed in the cars had to be of 2012-specification. After the deaths of touring car driver Phillip Yau and motorcycle rider Luís Carreira in support races for the 2012 event, organisers installed crash protection fences for safety reasons.

== Practice and qualifying ==
There were two 45-minute practice sessions preceding the Sunday race: one on Thursday morning and one on Friday morning. Alex Lynn set the fastest time for Theodore Racing by Prema in the opening practice session—held in variable weather conditions—with a lap of 2 minutes, 14.495 seconds, 0.061 seconds faster than any one else. His closest challenger was Félix da Costa in second in front of third-placed Coletti and Mücke Motorsport's Felix Rosenqvist in fourth position. Alexander Sims, Jaafar, Tom Blomqvist, Marciello, Lucas Auer and Korjus rounded out the session's top ten drivers. Sainz was the first driver to go off the slippery track and ricocheted off the Fisherman's Corner barrier with his car's rear. His teammate King understeered into the same barrier 11 minutes later, while Rosenqvist ran wide on dirty tyres at Lisboa turn and crashed at San Francisco Bend. Three other drivers—Sekiguchi, Lucas Wolf and Sun Zheng—failed to record a lap time by encountering incidents during the session.

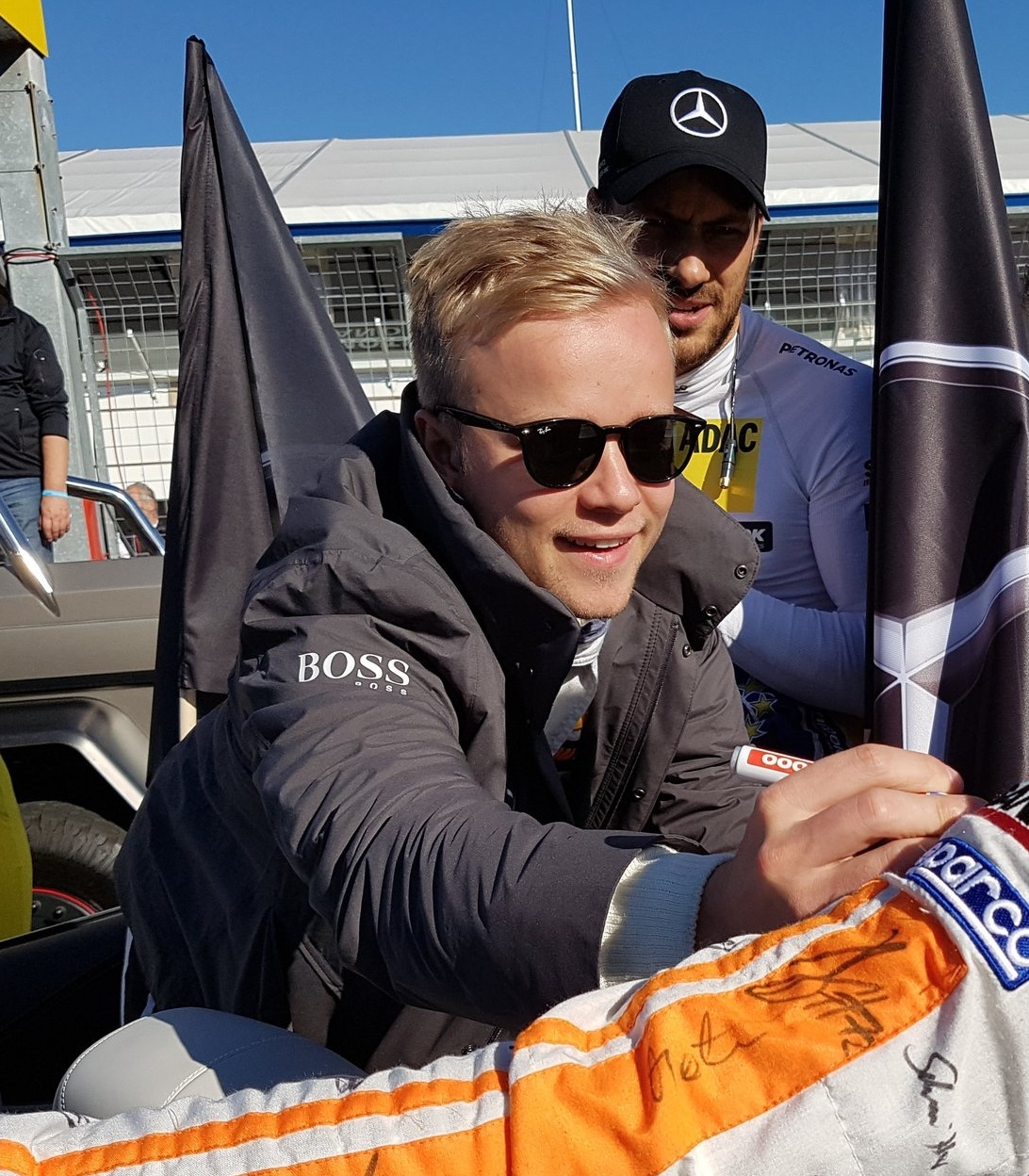
Felix Rosenqvist (pictured in 2016) was the early qualifying pace setter and went on to finish second in the qualification race.

Qualifying was divided into two sessions; the first was held on Thursday afternoon and ran for 40 minutes with the second held on Friday afternoon and lasted 30 minutes. The fastest time set by each driver from either session counted towards their final starting position for the qualification race. The first qualifying session had Rosenqvist come out on top with a late lap of 2 minutes, 12.751 seconds. He achieved this despite not slipstreaming any other car and recovered the lost time through the final sections of the track. Rosenqvist was 0.111 seconds faster than Félix da Costa with Sims a further three-tenths of a second slower in third. Harry Tincknell was fourth with Pipo Derani following in fifth having led the session in its opening minutes. Sainz ended up sixth in front of Coletti and Marciello. Korjus and Jaafar—who was forced to abort his fastest time because of red flags—rounded out the top ten. Auer was the fastest driver not to reach the top ten although he was fourth early on before other drivers improved on their best efforts. Following him were Blomqvist, King, Giovnazzi, Sekiguchi, William Buller, Nakayama, Ocon, Katsumasa Chiyo, Nicholas Latifi, Bryant-Meisner, Mason, Jones, Van de Laar, Sean Gelael, Lynn and Sun completing the order. Wolf sat out qualifying because of the damage sustained to his car in the first practice session. Lynn crashed his car at Fisherman's Bend in the first minutes which was temporarily halted to enable marshals to move his car into a safe location. The session ended early with a minute and 37 seconds remaining when Nakayama broke his suspension in an impact with a wall at Solitude Esses corner. Nakayama was unhurt.

In the second 45-minute practice session, Jaafar was quickest multiple times during the session until Korjus set a lap time of 2 minutes, 13.870 seconds which made him the fastest driver and ultimately held it to the conclusion of practice. Blomqvist was 0.063 seconds slower in second place. Carlin teammates Jaafar and Tincknell were third and fourth respectively. Lynn recovered from the first qualifying session to go fifth. Two more Carlin drivers: Sainz and Félix da Costa placed sixth and seventh. Sims, Buller and King occupied eighth to tenth places. Five drivers damaged their cars during the session: King made light contact with the barrier at Police Bend but rejoined after a replacement front wing was installed on his car. Auer struck a wall at the same turn with the left-hand side of the car and the session was stopped. Coletti's impact was harder and his car was extricated by a crane. Marciello did not continue after going deep at the Melco hairpin as he felt unsafe reversing. Chiyo's left-front corner was loosened from contact with a barrier lining the track.

In the second qualifying session, it was red-flagged soon after it started: Chiyo crashed at San Francisco Bend but the stoppage was short-lived as course workers worked swiftly to get running back under way. Lynn bettered Rosenqvist's benchmark first qualifying lap and recorded the fastest time which was suppressed soon by Derani. A second stoppage occurred when Sun and Mason crashed at Moorish corner just as Blomqvist went quickest. No driver managed a timed lap as Giovinazzi crashed against a barrier at Paiol turn, causing a third red flag. When the session restarted, Rosenqvist took provisional pole before Marciello took it with a 2 minutes, 11.555 seconds lap. Rosenqvist slipstreamed other cars but was cautious in the final two turns as he was confident of pole position. Lynn was a tenth of a second adrift in third. Auer moved up from his provisional grid slot to start fourth; he stalled in the pit lane.at the third restart. Félix da Costa dropped to fifth as Blomqvist improved to sixth. His teammate Derani took seventh. The top ten was completed by Carlin runners with Jaafar leading Tincknell and King. Behind them the rest of the field lined up as Sims, Buller, Korjus, Sainz, Ocon, Latifi, Coletti, Sekiguchi, Wolf, Giovinazzi, Nakayama, Van de Laar, Byrant-Meisner, Gelael, Mason, Jones, Chiyo and Sun. Jaafar, Nakayama and Jones each received penalties after second qualifying; Nakayama and Jones were demoted to the back of the grid for changing their engines while Jaafar dropped five places for a yellow flag infringement.

=== Qualifying classification ===
Final qualifying classification
Pos	No.	Driver	Team	Q1 Time	Rank	Q2 Time	Rank	Gap	Grid
1	8	(Italy) Raffaele Marciello	Prema Powerteam	2:13.831	8	2:11.555	1		1
2	14	(Sweden) Felix Rosenqvist	GR Asia with Mücke	2:12.751	1	2:11.622	2	+0.067	2
3	10	(United Kingdom) Alex Lynn	Theodore Racing by Prema	2:18.800	26	2:11.639	3	+0.084	3
4	9	(Austria) Lucas Auer	Theodore Racing by Prema	2:14.262	11	2:12.052	4	+0.497	4
5	1	(Portugal) António Félix da Costa	Carlin	2:12.862	2	2:12.083	5	+0.528	5
6	21	(United Kingdom) Tom Blomqvist	Fortec Motorsport	2:14.315	12	2:12.111	6	+0.556	6
7	18	(Brazil) Pipo Derani	Fortec Motorsport	2:13.646	5	2:12.144	7	+0.589	7
8	4	(Malaysia) Jazeman Jaafar	Carlin	2:14.087	10	2:12.225	8	+0.670	13^{1}
9	3	(United Kingdom) Harry Tincknell	Carlin	2:13.518	4	2:12.409	9	+0.854	8
10	5	(United Kingdom) Jordan King	Carlin	2:14.453	13	2:12.616	10	+1.061	9
11	23	(United Kingdom) Alexander Sims	ThreeBond with T-Sport	2:13.196	3	2:12.698	11	+1.143	10
12	19	(United Kingdom) William Buller	Fortec Motorsport	2:14.591	16	2:12.768	12	+1.213	11
13	24	(Estonia) Kevin Korjus	Double R Racing	2:13.870	9	2:13.053	13	+1.498	12
14	2	(Spain) Carlos Sainz Jr.	Carlin	2:13.715	6	2:13.173	14	+1.618	14
15	11	(France) Esteban Ocon	Prema Powerteam	2:15.119	18	2:13.333	15	+1.778	15
16	6	(Canada) Nicholas Latifi	Carlin	2:15.350	20	2:13.551	16	+1.996	15
17	22	(Monaco) Stefano Coletti	EuroInternational	2:13.777	7	18:30.415	27	+2.222	17
18	15	(Japan) Yuhi Sekiguchi	Mücke Motorsport	2:14.553	15	2:13.833	17	+2.278	18
19	29	(Germany) Lucas Wolf	URD Rennsport	—	28	2:13.938	18	+2.383	19
20	27	(Italy) Antonio Giovinazzi	Double R Racing	2:14.506	14	2:14.018	19	+2.463	20
21	12	(Japan) Yuichi Nakayama	TOM'S	2:14.664	17	2:14.018	20	+2.753	27^{2}
22	16	(Netherlands) Dennis van de Laar	Mücke Motorsport	2:16.473	24	2:14.310	21	+2.755	21
23	20	(Sweden) John Bryant-Meisner	Fortec Motorsport	2:15.881	21	2:14.570	22	+3.015	22
24	26	(Indonesia) Sean Gelael	Double R Racing	2:17.334	25	2:14.657	23	+3.102	23
25	30	(Canada) Nelson Mason	Jo Zeller Racing	2:15.949	22	2:14.706	24	+3.151	24
26	17	(United Arab Emirates) Ed Jones	Fortec Motorsport	2:16.094	23	2:14.975	25	+3.420	28^{2}
27	28	(Japan) Katsumasa Chiyo	B-Max Engineering	2:15.253	19	18:34.053	28	+3.502	25
28	25	(China) Sun Zheng	Double R Racing	2:20.906	27	2:18.912	26	+7.357	26
110% qualifying time: 2:24.710
Bold time indicates the faster of the two times that determined the grid order.

Notes:

- ^1 – Jazeman Jaafar was demoted five places because of a yellow flag infringement.
- ^2 – Yuichi Nakayama and Ed Jones started at the back of the field because of engine changes.

== Qualifying race ==
The qualifying race to set the grid order for the main race started on 16 November at 14:00 Macau Standard Time (UTC+08:00). The weather at the start were dry and sunny with an air temperature of 23 °C (73 °F) and a track temperature at 39 °C (102 °F). On the grid, pole sitter Marciello was slow off the line and fell to fifth. Rosenqvist made a fast getaway to take the lead only for Lynn to slipstream up behind him and claim it on the outside of Mandarin Oriental Bend. In turn, Rosenqvist then slipstreamed onto the back of Lynn heading towards Lisboa corner and reclaimed first position as Lynn was forced to run deep and go wide, narrowly avoiding a collision with a barrier. Further down the field a safety car caused by a startline crash neutralised competitive racing. Blomqvist stalled and his rear was impacted by the slow-starting Tincknell, littering debris across the track. Van de Laar's race ended prematurely as he stalled on the grid. All cars were instructed to drive through the pit lane since marshals were needed to remove the two stricken cars from the circuit. The event restarted at the conclusion of lap three with Rosenqvist defending first place from Lynn after losing traction in his tyres from driving behind the safety car.

Lynn steered to the outside of Rosenqvist into Lisboa corner and turned in to take the lead. Félix da Costa overtook Auer for third up to Mandarin Oriental Bend, and Auer lost a further place to Marciello at Lisboa turn. Auer then crashed heavily against the barrier at San Francisco Bend while defending from Derani, ending his race early. Soon after Jones hit a bump going off the racing line at Fisherman's Bend and made contact with the wall. Yellow flags were shown in the area but were withdrawn after he was removed from the circuit. Up front Lynn continued to lead Rosenqvist while Félix da Costa was being hounded by Marciello for third. Meanwhile, King battled Sims for fifth with Coletti, Buller and Ocon in close formation in a duel over sixth. Mason was imposed a drive-through penalty after his team started his engine while stationary in the fast lane of the pit lane. Sims got ahead of King for fifth and began closing up to Derani. Buller overtook Coletti while Sainz passed Korjus for 11th. Marciello moved in front of Félix da Costa heading towards Lisboa corner on the fifth lap for third. Marciello set what was at that point a new fastest lap of the race as he drew closer to Rosenqvist. Ocon could not resist Sainz's challenge for tenth while the struggling Jaafar was overtaken by Korjus on the next lap.

Mason was black-flagged as he opted to continue racing and not take his drive-through penalty. Rosenqvist concentrated on not allowing Marciello get close to him while Félix da Costa and Derani waited to capitalise on any mistakes. Sainz overtook Coletti for ninth as Giovinazzi won a battle against Gelael for 17th. Giovinazzi then gained a further place with a pass on Wolf for 16th. Coletti lost ninth to Ocon in the closing stages while Korjus pulled to the side of the track at Fisherman's Bend with smoke billowing from his engine. Lynn opened up a two-second lead over the rest of the field to win the qualification race and pole position for the Grand Prix itself. He was joined on the front row of the grid by Rosenqvist while Marciello completed the podium despite gaining on Rosenqvist who felt a loss in tyre grip. Behind the two, Félix da Costa followed with Derani fifth. Sims, King and Buller were in close formation for positions six to eight. Sainz and Ocon completed the top ten. Coletti, Jaafar, Latifil, Sekiguchi, Giovnazzi, Wolf, Gelael, Nakayama, Chiyo, Bryant-Meisner, Sun, Mason and Korjus rounded out the 23 classified finishers.

=== Qualifying race classification ===
Final qualification race classification
Pos	No.	Driver	Team	Laps	Time/Retired	Grid
1	10	(United Kingdom) Alex Lynn	Theodore Racing by Prema	10	24:41.968	3
2	14	(Sweden) Felix Rosenqvist	GR Asia with Mücke	10	+2.411	2
3	8	(Italy) Raffaele Marciello	Prema Powerteam	10	+3.461	1
4	1	(Portugal) António Félix da Costa	Carlin	10	+4.089	5
5	18	(Brazil) Pipo Derani	Fortec Motorsport	10	+7.620	7
6	23	(United Kingdom) Alexander Sims	ThreeBond with T-Sport	10	+10.620	11
7	5	(United Kingdom) Jordan King	Carlin	10	+10.958	10
8	19	(United Kingdom) William Buller	Fortec Motorsport	10	+11.691	12
9	2	(Spain) Carlos Sainz Jr.	Carlin	10	+13.045	14
10	11	(France) Esteban Ocon	Prema Powerteam	10	+14.713	15
11	22	(Monaco) Stefano Coletti	EuroInternational	10	+15.853	17
12	4	(Malaysia) Jazeman Jaafar	Carlin	10	+17.068	8
13	6	(Canada) Nicholas Latifi	Carlin	10	+30.339	16
14	15	(Japan) Yuhi Sekiguchi	Mücke Motorsport	10	+30.990	18
15	27	(Italy) Antonio Giovinazzi	Double R Racing	10	+34.049	20
16	29	(Germany) Lucas Wolf	URD Rennsport	10	+35.563	19
17	26	(Indonesia) Sean Gelael	Double R Racing	10	+36.620	24
18	12	(Japan) Yuichi Nakayama	TOM'S	10	+38.920	21
19	28	(Japan) Katsumasa Chiyo	B-Max Engineering	10	+40.040	27
20	20	(Sweden) John Bryant-Meisner	Fortec Motorsport	10	+40.503	23
21	25	(China) Sun Zheng	Double R Racing	10	+1:06.786	28
22	30	(Canada) Nelson Mason	Jo Zeller Racing	10	+1:11.265	25
23	24	(Estonia) Kevin Korjus	Double R Racing	9	+1 Lap	13
Ret	9	(Austria) Lucas Auer	Theodore Racing by Prema	2	Accident	4
Ret	17	(United Arab Emirates) Ed Jones	Fortec Motorsport	2	Accident	26
Ret	21	(United Kingdom) Tom Blomqvist	Fortec Motorsport	0	Accident	6
Ret	16	(Netherlands) Dennis van de Laar	Mücke Motorsport	0	Stall	22
Ret	3	(United Kingdom) Harry Tincknell	Carlin	0	Accident	9
Fastest lap: Felix Rosenqvist, 2:12.312, 166.51 km/h (103.46 mph) on lap 8

== Main race ==
The race began at 15:30 local time on 17 November. The weather at the start were dry and sunny with an air temperature of 24 °C (75 °F) and a track temperature of 29 °C (84 °F). Three drivers took penalties: Korjus was demoted places because of an engine change. Tincknell was required to start from 27th as he was adjudged to have caused the collision between himself and Blomqvist. Mason joined Tincknell because he ignored his drive-through penalty due to a malfunctioning radio. Lynn maintained the lead into the first corner while Derani made a brisk start to move into second. Ocon stalled on the grid but later got moving. As the field drove down towards the fast Mandarin Oriental Bend some bumping occurred. This caused Rosenqvist to hit the barrier and broke his suspension after battling with Marciello for the ideal line. Marciello's car sustained damage but continued with an oversteer. Soon after, Auer pushed Bryant-Meisner off the racing line, causing the latter to crash into the wall. Gelael spun trying to avoid hitting Bryant-Meisner, causing Auer to plough into him. The events meant Bryant-Meisner, Gelael and Auer retired from the race.

I can't really put it into words – I've dreamed of winning this race ever since I came here for the first time. Since I finished third last year all I've wanted to do is win it, and I can't believe I've done it. I think I had quite a lot of understeer in the qualification race and Marciello was a lot quicker than me in the last corner in that race. I thought I'd have to battle my way back through after being passed at the start or a restart. The gap between me and Antonio kept coming down and I just thought 'hang on, hang on,' and I did it in the end.

— Alex Lynn, on winning the 60th Macau Grand Prix.

Giovnazzi spun at the Melco hairpin but recovered. The safety car's deployment was necessitated to allow for a track clearing. At the end of the first lap, Lynn led from Derani, Félix da Costa, Marciello, Sims, Coletti, Buller, King, Sainz and Latifi. At the restart, Lynn held the lead and Derani was passed by Félix da Costa on the outside at Lisboa corner. Sims lined up a pass on Marciello but realised it could not be completed and eased off. King fell to ninth when Sainz overtook him. Lynn increased his lead to two seconds in the following laps. Marciello attempted to force his way through Derani but the latter resisted his overtaking attempts. Sainz moved in front of both Coletti and Buller but the two drivers retook their lost positions. Marciello passed Derani at Lisboa corner for third place. On lap seven, Coletti and Buller collided, causing the latter's retirement but the former restarted racing after loing positions by spinning onto the escape road. The main beneficiary of the crash was King who moved to seventh. Both King and his Carlin teammate Jaafar passed Sainz after a battle for sixth. Sun spun off at Fisherman's Bend, prompting the brief waving of localised yellow flags.

Maricello pushed but lost control of his car at the R Bend and collided against a barrier. His retirement relieved pressure off Félix da Costa who used the situation to close up to Lynn. Sims slowed at about lap ten due to an engine temperature sensor problem which he corrected by short shifting and pulling out of Derani's slipstream. Félix da Costa gained on Lynn to be just over a second behind with four laps to go. He reduced the gap to 1.3 seconds under yellow flag conditions for Wolf's stranded car at Lisboa corner, but could not get close to affect a pass on Lynn who maintained the lead for the rest of the race to become the seventh Macau Grand Prix winner for Theodore Racing. The 2012 winner Félix da Costa finished second, 1.173 seconds in arrears, while Derani completed the podium in third. Off the podium, Sims finished fourth. The highest-placed rookie King led Carlin teammates Jaafar and Sainz in the next three places. Blomqvist came from the back of the field to finish eighth with Latifi ninth. Ocon recovered from his stall to place tenth. Outside the top ten, Sekiguchi was 11th and led fellow countryman Nakayama in 12th. The British pair of Buller and Tincknell followed in 13th and 14th with Chiyo, Giovinazzi, Mason, Van der Laar, Jones, Wolf and Korjus the final classified finishers.

=== Main race classification ===
Final main race classification
Pos	No.	Driver	Team	Laps	Time/Retired	Grid
1	10	(United Kingdom) Alex Lynn	Theodore Racing by Prema	15	37:37.975	1
2	1	(Portugal) António Félix da Costa	Carlin	15	+1.173	4
3	18	(Brazil) Pipo Derani	Fortec Motorsport	15	+6.795	5
4	23	(United Kingdom) Alexander Sims	ThreeBond with T-Sport	15	+8.203	6
5	5	(United Kingdom) Jordan King	Carlin	15	+9.573	7
6	4	(Malaysia) Jazeman Jaafar	Carlin	15	+15.547	12
7	2	(Spain) Carlos Sainz Jr.	Carlin	15	+15.547	9
8	21	(United Kingdom) Tom Blomqvist	Fortec Motorsport	15	+26.160	26
9	6	(Canada) Nicholas Latifi	Carlin	15	+29.288	13
10	11	(France) Esteban Ocon	Prema Powerteam	15	+30.914	10
11	15	(Japan) Yuhi Sekiguchi	Mücke Motorsport	15	+32.854	14
12	12	(Japan) Yuichi Nakayama	TOM'S	15	+32.790	18
13	19	(United Kingdom) William Buller	Fortec Motorsport	15	+34.265	8
14	3	(United Kingdom) Harry Tincknell	Carlin	15	+36.532	27^{3}
15	28	(Japan) Katsumasa Chiyo	B-Max Engineering	15	+36.902	19
16	27	(Italy) Antonio Giovinazzi	Double R Racing	15	+37.584	15
17	30	(Canada) Nelson Mason	Jo Zeller Racing	15	+39.877	22^{4}
18	16	(Netherlands) Dennis van de Laar	Mücke Motorsport	15	+1:01.651	27
19	17	(United Arab Emirates) Ed Jones	Fortec Motorsport	15	+1:29.025	25
20	29	(Germany) Lucas Wolf	URD Rennsport	14	+1 Lap	16
21	24	(Estonia) Kevin Korjus	Double R Racing	13	+2 Lap	23^{5}
Ret	8	(Italy) Raffaele Marciello	Prema Powerteam	9	Accident	3
Ret	22	(Monaco) Stefano Coletti	EuroInternational	7	Collision	11
Ret	25	(China) Sun Zheng	Double R Racing	6	Accident	21
Ret	14	(Sweden) Felix Rosenqvist	GR Asia with Mücke	0	Collision	2
Ret	26	(Indonesia) Sean Gelael	Double R Racing	0	Collision	17
Ret	20	(Sweden) John Bryant-Meisner	Fortec Motorsport	0	Collision	20
Ret	9	(Austria) Lucas Auer	Theodore Racing by Prema	0	Collision	24
Fastest lap: Jordan King, 2:11.547, 104.07 km/h (64.67 mph) on lap 15

Notes:

- ^3 – Harry Tincknell was mandated to start on the fourteenth row of the grid for causing an avoidable collision.
- ^4 – Nelson Mason was required to begin at the back of field after ignoring a penalty notice during the qualification race.
- ^5 – Kevin Korjus was demoted places for changing his engine after the qualification race.

== See also ==
- 2013 Guia Race of Macau
