= Van Laer =

Van Laer is a surname. Earlier spellings include Van Laar and Van Leer. Notable people with the surname include:

- Alexander Theobald Van Laer (1857–1920), American painter
- Arnold Johan Ferdinand Van Laer (1869–1955), Archivist, translator, editor, and historian of Dutch-language documents from New Netherland
- Pieter van Laer (1599 – c. 1642), Dutch Golden Age painter
- Roeland van Laer (1598 – after 1635), Dutch Golden Age painter
- Wannes Van Laer (born 1985), Belgian sailor
