= Nizhyn Gogol State University =

Public university in Nizhyn, Ukraine

Coordinates: 51°03′09″N 31°52′51″E

Nizhyn M.Gogol State University
- ДЗВО "Ніжинський університет імені М.Гоголя"
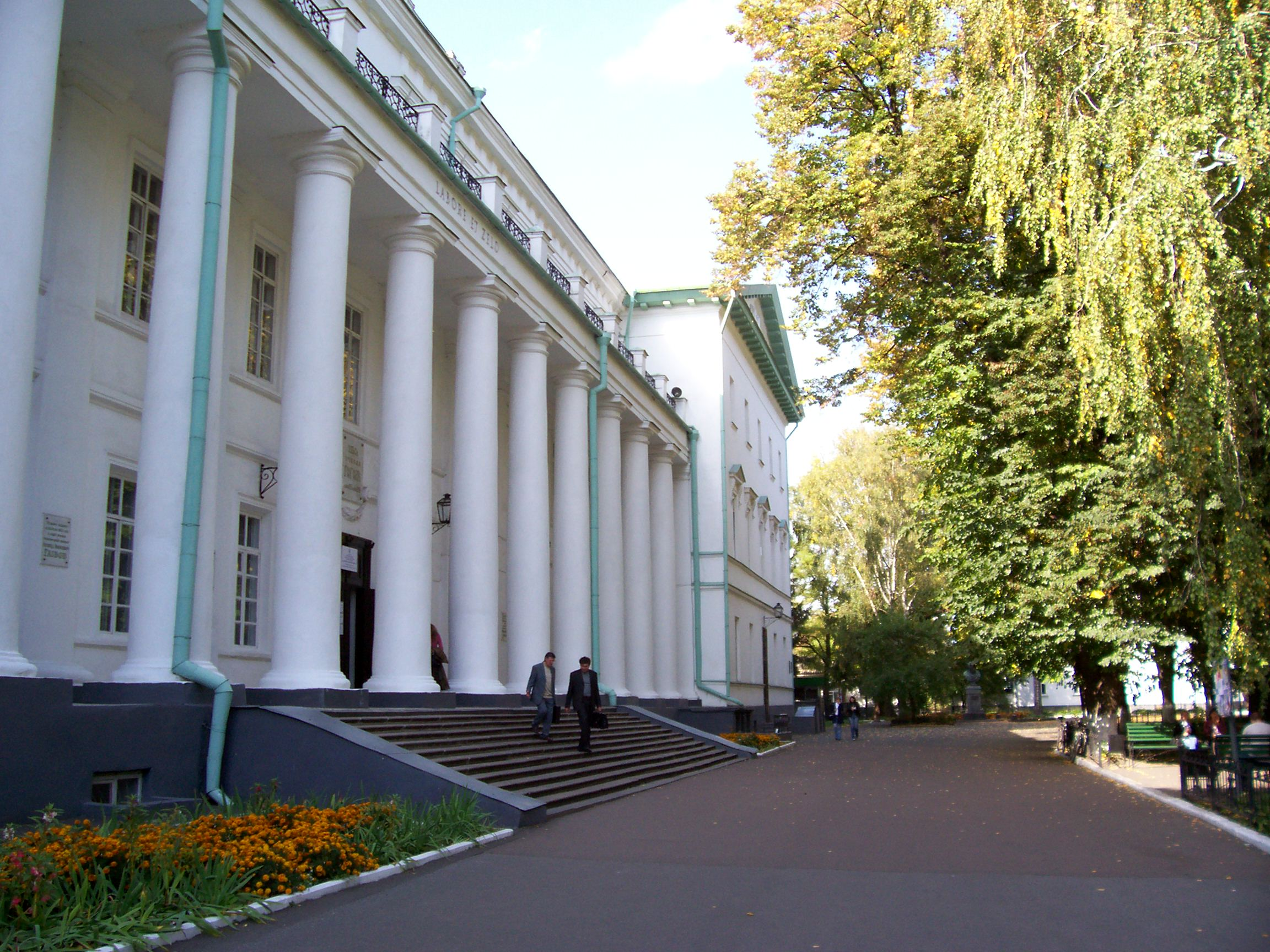
- The Old Building
- Motto: Labore et Zelo (Latin)
- Motto in English: By work and diligence
- Type: Public
- Established: 1805; 221 years ago
- Affiliations: Ministry of Education and Science of Ukraine
- Rector: O.G. Samojlenko
- Students: 8,500
- Location: Nizhyn, Ukraine
- Website: www.ndu.edu.ua

Immovable Monument of National Significance of Ukraine
- Official name: Ліцей (Lyceum)
- Type: Architecture
- Reference no.: 250064

The Nizhyn Gogol State University (Ukrainian: Ніжинський державний університет ім. М.Гоголя) is an academic state-sponsored university in Ukraine, located in Nizhyn, Chernihiv Oblast. It is one of the oldest institutions of higher education in Ukraine. It was originally established as the Nizhyn Lyceum of Prince Bezborodko; since then it has changed its name several times. Currently, it consists of seven faculties and about 8,000 students study there.

== History ==
The chronicle of higher school in Nizhyn dates back to 1805, when Prince I. Bezborodko, in reply to his request, received the tsar's permission for the construction of a Gymnasium in Nizhyn. On 25 July 1805 the Russian senate adopted a resolution on founding Prince Bezborodko's Gymnasium of Higher Learning in Nizhyn.

The main building of the gymnasium was designed in the style of classical architecture by a famous 19th-century architect, Luigi Rusca. After I. Bezborodko's death in 1815 the construction of the gymnasium was continued by his grandson, O. Kushelyov-Bezborodko, who later became its honoured administrator.

Prince Bezborodko's Gymnasium of Higher Learning was opened for studies on 4 September 1820. The gymnasium focused on the Humanities and it was initially an educational establishment for the sons of the gentry. Its nine-year programme offered a classical education with instruction in Religion, Classical and Modern Languages, Geography, History, Physics and Mathematics, Political Economy, Military Science and the Arts.

The first director was Vasyl Kukolnyk, an outstanding scholar and Doctor of Law, Philosophy, and Arts. He taught Chemistry, Technology and Agriculture, Physics, the Roman Law etc.

During the 200 years of the existence of the Higher School in Nizhyn it has changed its role several times: Prince Bezborodko Gymnasium of Higher Learning (1820–1832), Technical (Physics and Mathematics) Lyceum (1832–1840), Law School (1840–1875), Prince Oleksandr Bezborodko Historical-Philological Institute (1875–1921), Nizhyn Institute of People's Education (1921–1934), Nizhyn Gogol State Pedagogical University (1998–2004). On 15 October 2004 it became Nizhyn State University named after Mykola Gogol.

== Organisation ==
Nizhyn State University has seven faculties: Philology, History and Law, Social and Humanitarian, Foreign Languages, Culture and Arts, Nature and Geography, Physics and Mathematics. The university comprises 31 chairs: Teaching Techniques, English Language, English Philology, etc.

There are postgraduate departments in 10 specialties; Lyceum; Two educational-methodological centres in Pryluky and Novhorod-Siversky; Preparatory department; Post-diploma education.

At present, there are 8,500 students: 3,500 students are full-time and 5,000 are extramural.

== Campus ==
The university campus is on the bank of the Oster river, right in the centre of Nizhyn.

There are five academic buildings. The most significant is the main building called the Gogol building. The memorial plaque over the entrance says "Gogol studied here: 1821-1828". Being one of the first students of the Nizhyn Gymnasium, Gogol became an outstanding writer. Over the plaque the university motto reads "Labore Et Zelo" ("By work and diligence").

In front of the main building is Gogol Square with a memorial to the victims of World War II. To the left of the main building is the monument to Count Bezborodko, the founder of the institution. It was unveiled in 1990 owing to the efforts of its former rector academician F. Arvat.

The new academic building of the university was erected in 1970 to mark the 165th anniversary of its foundation and the 150th anniversary of its opening. The four-storey construction hosts the university administration and Social and Humanitarian, Physics and Mathematics faculties.

In front of the new academic building there is a monument to the teacher, which is the first in Ukraine. The university park, the Count's Park, behind the university buildings, is 200 years old. On the campus there are two more academic buildings for the students of Culture and Arts, Nature and Geography departments. Next to the administrative building you will see two dormitories, canteen, and sportsground.

== Collections ==
=== Gogol Museum ===
The Gogol Museum is the oldest university museum. It was opened in 1909 on centenary anniversary of Gogol. The main aim of the museum was to elucidate for the present generations Gogol's life and his creative work of the Nizhyn period. The materials are arranged on 15 stands of the two museum rooms. The exhibits include the portraits of Gogol's parents, painted by the 19th-century artists, photocopies of the teachers and the Gymnasium students' portraits, their progress lists, textbooks and training aids of that time.

=== University museum ===
The university library is a unique book collection, which dates back to 1820. In 1899 a separate library building was erected in Gogol Street.

During the Gymnasium's transformation the library funds were accumulated in various ways. Much work in the formation of the book funds was done by its librarians: professors K. Shapalynsky, I. Landrazhyn, M. Solovyov, and D. Aman. Nowadays, the library boasts over 1 million books and periodicals. The library has the Museum of Rare Books, the Gogol Research Centre, five reading halls for 600 readers.

=== The Museum of Rare Books ===
The Museum of Rare Books boasts over 100,000 volumes of rare books. About 2,000 books are exhibited in its two halls. Among them are the ancient editions of the 16th–18th centuries such as the Iliad and Odyssey by Homer, Aeneid by Vergil, Grammar by Meletius Smotrytsky, Arithmetic by Leonty Magnitskyy, etc.

The museum was opened in 1985. The great contribution to the work of it was done by the famous philologist H. Vasylkyvsky. That is why the museum was named in his honour.

=== The Gogol Research Centre ===
The Gogol Research Centre was set up in 1995. There are a number of works concerning Gogol's life and his literary activities published by the professors and lectures of the university. About 2000 copies of books about Gogol are exhibited in its two rooms.

=== The University Picture Gallery ===
The picture gallery occupies three halls next to the Gogol Museum. Opened in 1957, it consists of 230 paintings by Ukrainian and West European artists of the 14th-20th centuries. The Renaissance school of painting is most vividly represented here. The paintings by the famous Byzantine, Italian, Flemish and Dutch artists, such as Carracci, Rubens, Van Laar and one of the famous paintings "Mary Magdalene", painted by Titian himself, are exhibited.

== Famous alumni and academics ==
Many outstanding writers and poets studied in Nizhyn Higher School: Nikolay Gogol, Yevhen Hrebinka, V. Zabila, L. Hlibov, M. Herbel, Yu. Zbanatsky, Ye. Hutsalo, Yefim Karsky, etc.

The history of higher school in Nizhyn is connected with the names of artists: Ya.-de-Balmen, M. Samokysh; actors: F. Stravynsky, M. Kazmin. Among the graduates of Nizhyn Higher School are well-known educators, scholars, statesmen, cultural figures: academicians M. Derzhavin, A. Bohomolets, T. Buhaiko. Its alumni S. Holub, L. Kostenko and others became Honoured Art Workers.

At the time of the Prince Bezborodko Gymnasium of Higher Sciences a group of qualified teachers worked there: professors K. Shapalynsky, M. Belousov, F. Zinher and the artist K. Pavlov.

The singer Alla Kudlai studied at Nizhyn Gogol State University.

== See also ==
- Mykola Gogol
- Prince Bezborodko
