= Palm Beach International Raceway =

Motorsport track in the United States

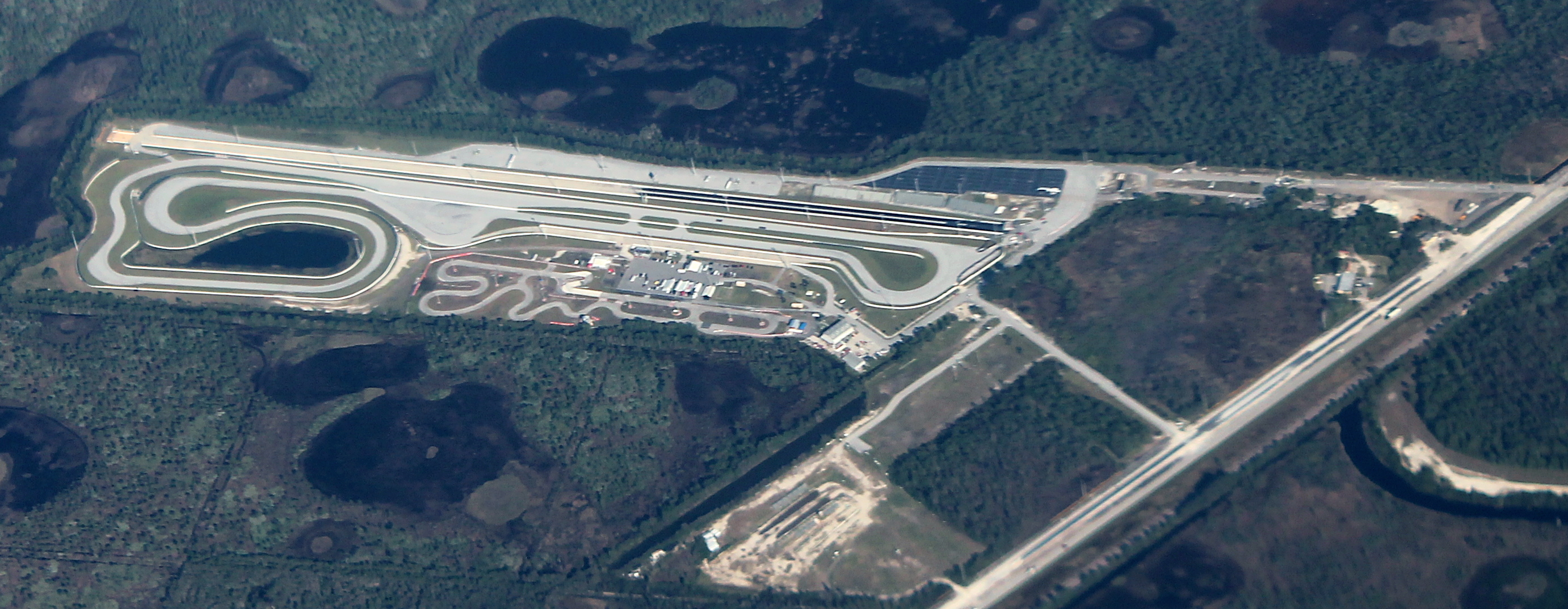
- Road Course (2008–2022)
- Location: Palm Beach County, near Jupiter, Florida
- Coordinates: 26°55′19.54″N 80°18′20.06″W
- Capacity: 6,000
- Owner: IRG S+E (2008–2022); Dick Moroso (1981–2008)
- Broke ground: 1964
- Opened: 1965
- Closed: 23 April 2022; 4 years ago
- Construction cost: $1.5 Million
- Architect: Martyn Thake, Others
- Former names: Moroso Motorsports Park (1981–1998)
- Major events: Atlantic Championship (2015–2016); Florida Winter Series (2014); LATAM Challenge Series (2014); US F2000 Winterfest (2012–2013); ARCA Racing Series (2010); Ferrari Challenge North America (1994–1995); Trans-Am Series (1983); AMA Superbike Championship (1982)

Road Course (2008–2022)
- Surface: Asphalt
- Length: 2.043 mi (3.288 km)
- Turns: 11
- Race lap record: 1:09.686 ( (Estonia) Tõnis Kasemets, Swift 016.a, 2015, Formula Atlantic)

Original Road Course (1964–2007)
- Surface: Asphalt
- Length: 2.250 mi (3.621 km)
- Turns: 11
- Race lap record: 1:21.561 ( (United States) Willy T. Ribbs, Chevrolet Camaro, 1983, Trans-Am)

Palm Beach International Raceway (stylized as PBIR and formerly Moroso Motorsports Park) was a motorsports facility located west of Jupiter, Florida. The facility had a quarter-mile drag strip, a 2.043 mi (3.288 km) road course, 0.700 mi (1.127 km) kart track as well as mud racing tracks. The road course at Palm Beach International Raceway was a 2-mile, 10-turn circuit constructed of hot-mix asphalt and set on an aggregate base. It was 40 ft (12 m) wide with a 0.333 mi (0.536 km) section measuring 80 ft (24 m).

The Palm Beach International Raceway Drag Strip was a quarter-mile, all-concrete racing surface. One of six tracks in the U.S. built completely from concrete, it was more stable, level and consistent than asphalt. The track is sanctioned by the International Hot Rod Association (IHRA).

PBIR was also home to the Palm Beach Driving Club.

== History ==
=== Early days ===
The facility opened in 1964, costing a reported $1.5 million to build. The track was originally named "Palm Beach International Raceway" and was owned by local contractor Joe Bucheck Jr. and his brother Edward. In March 1965 the inaugural race was held at the track. Some 10,000 spectators attended the event, which was a series of sports car events.

Racing promoter Alec Ullman was set to move the 12 Hour Race in Sebring from Sebring International Raceway for the 1967 season to the facility after deaths in the 1966 race. Those plans eventually fell through due to the $1.5 million it would cost to expand the site. In November 1969 a controversial rock concert was held at the facility after months of legal battles. During the rock festival artists such as Janis Joplin, The Rolling Stones, Sly & The Family Stone and Jefferson Airplane performed. Since then, several artists including Eric Clapton have performed there. Another concert featuring Led Zeppelin, Bachman–Turner Overdrive and J. Geils Band was in the works in 1975 but organizers cancelled it when they decided the facility couldn't handle the estimated 50,000 fans that were expected to attend.

In April 1971 the Grand American Series of Professional Drag Racing had one of the first major drag racing events held at the track. The facility hosted an air show November 7, 1971. The Air Force Thunderbirds were scheduled to perform but had to cancel due to flooding on the track. In 1979 famous sports car and Indy 500 racer Lyn St. James made her professional debut at the facility, which ended in a major accident in which her car crashed into the swamps and sank in the mud.

=== Moroso era ===
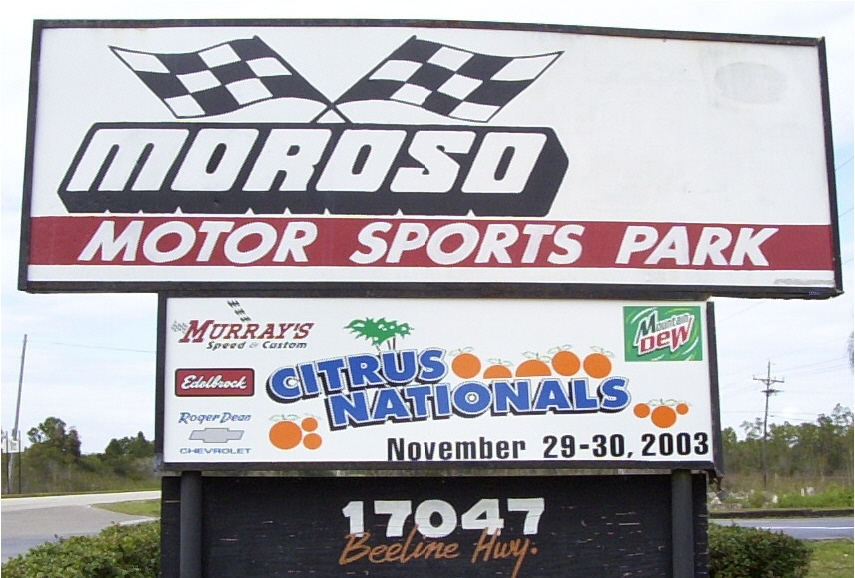
Moroso Motorsports Park in 2003

In 1981, Dick Moroso, founder of Moroso Racing Parts, purchased the track and renamed it "Moroso Motorsports Park". In 1982, Moroso spent $100,000 to upgrade the facility to host the opening event of the 1983 SCCA Trans Am Series. The facility was scheduled to host a circus in 1987, but it was cancelled after promoters found out about a poor safety record.

The facility hosted several SCCA national and regional events. The track was also host to several IHRA and NHRA special events and the "Super Chevy Show", which drew more than 100,000 spectators over the three-day event for several years. The event was later replaced with the "All Chevy Show" which generally occurs in March. In 1996, Moroso considered spending $2 million on a one-mile oval track for stock car racing, but those plans fell through. In 1998, Moroso died from brain cancer and his family inherited ownership of the track. In 2002, MTV filmed a drag racing documentary at the track. The Speed Channel show Pinks visited the facility in 2007 to film an episode.

The raceway featured quite prominently in Top Gear's 2007 USA Special. Jeremy Clarkson, James May, Richard Hammond and The Stig's American cousin all raced cars at the speedway, that the former three had purchased in Miami earlier. This was its most notable appearance on television, and one of the most recent appearances.

=== Modernization ===
In 2008, a group of local motorsports enthusiasts purchased Moroso Motorsports Park. The new owners closed the track, remodeled it into a state-of-the-art motorsports facility and changed the track's name back to "Palm Beach International Raceway." The old facility was completely altered, adding a new road course similar to the original but with some minor modifications. Low-glare lighting was added to the track along with brand new safety barriers and an amount of other upgrades. The track hosted an ARCA Remax Series event and several drag racing events. The facility again hosted the show "Pinks All Out" on March 6, 2010. The facility also hosted a wide variety of motorsports events, including "Mud Bog"—an event for ATV and offroad enthusiasts—the Palm Beach Driving Club (PBDC), Hooked on Driving (HOD), Bertil Roos Racing School, Florida Track Days (FTD), Florida Motorcycle Road Racing Association (FMRRA), and the Ferrari Cavallino Classic.

The facility is popular with teams from all forms of racing for testing. Several IndyCar Series teams use the track for winter testing, as do several sports car teams from the Rolex Sports Car Series including locally based Orbit Racing, as well as Riviera Beach-based Extreme Speed Motorsports. Once the track gets its FIA Grade 2 certification it will be eligible to host a wide variety of motorsports events including IndyCar Series, Indy Lights, Grand Am and other major forms of racing.

=== Closing ===
On Saturday, April 23, 2022 a "Last Lap" event was held to commemorate the closure of Palm Beach International Raceway. The event consisted of a car show, drag racing, a parade lap around the road course and a final run down the drag strip by the Larsen Jet Cars. The event was announced on Thursday, March 3, 2022 via a web site announcement which stated "Opened in 1964, this iconic venue has hosted championship road races, South Florida’s most prestigious drag racing event, the Citrus Nationals, and some of the largest acts in musical history including the Rolling Stones, Jefferson Starship, and Eric Clapton. In addition, PBIR has served as a test facility for top IndyCar, sports car and drag racing teams."

== Facility ==
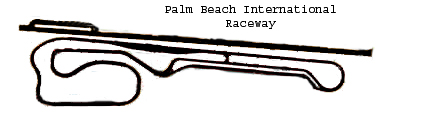
Map of the facility (2008–2022)

=== Road course ===
The road course's length is 2.043 mi (3.288 km) and was designed by Martyn Thake with help from several other in-house designers. It is paved with 5-inch-deep (130 mm) asphalt on an aggregate base. It featured a 90-foot-wide (27 m) section on the back straight for adding a chicane in the future. The course was awaiting a FIA Class II certification.

=== Drag strip ===
The drag strip is an IHRA-sanctioned 1,000–1,320 ft (300–400 m) concrete course built to NHRA specifications, as well.

== Lap records ==
The fastest official race lap records at Palm Beach International Raceway (formerly Moroso Motorsports Park) for different classes are listed as:

Category	Time	Driver	Vehicle	Event
Road Course (2008–2022): 2.043 mi (3.288 km)
Formula Atlantic	1:09.686	Tõnis Kasemets	Swift 016.a	2015 Palm Beach Atlantic Championship round
US F2000	1:12.783	Spencer Pigot	Van Diemen DP08	2012 Palm Beach US F2000 Winterfest round
Formula Abarth	1:14.009	Max Verstappen	Tatuus FA010B	2014 Palm Beach Florida Winter Series round
Original Road Course (1964–2007): 2.250 mi (3.621 km)
Trans-Am	1:21.561	Willy T. Ribbs	Chevrolet Camaro	1983 Palm Beach Trans-Am round

== Race winners ==
=== Road course ===
Trans-Am Series

Year	Date	Driver	Car Make	Distance (miles)	Average Speed (mph)	Team	Ref
1983	May 1	Gene Felton	Pontiac Trans Am	101.25	85.309	Oftedahl Racing	

ARCA Racing Series

Year	Date	Driver	Car Make	Distance (miles)	Average Speed (mph)	Team	Ref
2010	February 27	Justin Marks	Dodge	150	73.037	Win-Tron Racing	
