= 2014 Florida Winter Series =

Car racing series

Seasons
- ← none none →

The 2014 Florida Winter Series season was the inaugural and only season for the Florida Winter Series, a non-championship racing series organised by the Ferrari Driver Academy in Florida. The season started with a collective test on 22 January 2014 at Homestead-Miami Speedway, before a total of 12 races were held over 4 race meetings at Sebring International Raceway, Palm Beach International Raceway and Homestead-Miami Speedway.

One of the academy's driver roster, Formula Renault 2.0 Alps competitor Antonio Fuoco, was one of two drivers to win four races along with Nicholas Latifi, who had contested the FIA European Formula Three Championship in 2013. KZ1 karting world champion Max Verstappen won races at Palm Beach and Homestead, as he contested his first single-seater races prior to a campaign in the FIA European Formula Three Championship with Van Amersfoort Racing, while Dennis van de Laar and Tatiana Calderón each won races at Sebring, as they also prepared for their respective FIA European Formula Three Championship campaigns.

The series used the Tatuus FA010B chassis. This car is also used in Formula Abarth and other regional championships. The car is built to Formula 3 safety regulations to ensure the drivers safety. The car is powered by a 1400cc Fiat-FPT engine producing 190 hp.

== Drivers ==
No.	Driver	Previous series	Rounds
2	(United Kingdom) Ed Jones	British Formula 3 Championship National Class	All
3	(Netherlands) Max Verstappen	Karting KZ1	All
4	(Netherlands) Dennis van de Laar	FIA European Formula Three Championship	All
5	(Canada) Lance Stroll	Karting KF1	All
6	(Italy) Antonio Fuoco	Formula Renault 2.0 Alps	All
7	(Colombia) Tatiana Calderón	FIA European Formula Three Championship	All
9	(United Kingdom) Ben Anderson	Formula Ford 1600	1
9	(United Kingdom) Will Buxton	none	2
9	(United Kingdom) Oliver Marriage	none	4
11	(Poland) Alex Bosak	Formula Renault 2.0 Alps	All
17	(Russia) Vasily Romanov	Karting KF1	All
18	(Canada) Nicholas Latifi	FIA European Formula Three Championship	All
23	(Japan) Takashi Kasai	Karting KF1	All
53	(Italy) Raffaele Marciello	FIA European Formula Three Championship	All

== Calendar ==
All rounds were held in Florida, United States.

Round	Circuit	Location	Race 1	Race 2	Race 3
1	Sebring Raceway	Sebring, Florida	January 26	January 27	January 27
2	Palm Beach International Raceway	Jupiter, Florida	February 4	February 5	February 5
3	Homestead-Miami Speedway RC	Homestead, Florida	February 13	February 14	February 14
4	Homestead-Miami Speedway RC Mod	Homestead, Florida	February 18	February 19	February 19

== Results ==
All rounds were held in Florida, United States.

Round		Circuit	Pole position	Fastest lap	Winning driver
1	R1	Sebring Raceway	(Italy) Antonio Fuoco	(Netherlands) Max Verstappen	(Netherlands) Dennis van de Laar
1	R2	Sebring Raceway		(Canada) Nicholas Latifi	(Colombia) Tatiana Calderón
1	R3	Sebring Raceway	(Netherlands) Max Verstappen	(Italy) Antonio Fuoco	(Italy) Antonio Fuoco
2	R4	Palm Beach International Raceway	(Italy) Antonio Fuoco	(Netherlands) Max Verstappen	(Italy) Antonio Fuoco
2	R5	Palm Beach International Raceway		(Netherlands) Dennis van de Laar	(Canada) Nicholas Latifi
2	R6	Palm Beach International Raceway	(Netherlands) Max Verstappen	(Colombia) Tatiana Calderón	(Netherlands) Max Verstappen
3	R7	Homestead-Miami Speedway RC	(Italy) Antonio Fuoco	(Canada) Nicholas Latifi	(Italy) Antonio Fuoco
3	R8	Homestead-Miami Speedway RC		(United Kingdom) Ed Jones	(Canada) Nicholas Latifi
3	R9	Homestead-Miami Speedway RC	(Netherlands) Max Verstappen	(Italy) Antonio Fuoco	(Italy) Antonio Fuoco
4	R10	Homestead-Miami Speedway RC Mod	(Canada) Lance Stroll	(Italy) Antonio Fuoco	(Canada) Nicholas Latifi
4	R11	Homestead-Miami Speedway RC Mod		(United Kingdom) Ed Jones	(Canada) Nicholas Latifi
4	R12	Homestead-Miami Speedway RC Mod	(United Kingdom) Ed Jones (Note: Antonio Fuoco took pole position, but was dropped five places because of an earlier jump start. Therefore, Ed Jones was handed the pole position.)	(Netherlands) Max Verstappen	(Netherlands) Max Verstappen

=== Drivers' results ===
All races were non-championship, with no points awarded.

Driver	SEB			PAL			HMS1			HMS2		
(Italy) Antonio Fuoco	**2**	2	1	**1**	11	5	**1**	5	1	2	4	5
(Canada) Nicholas Latifi	3	NC	5	7	1	12	4	1	2	1	1	2
(Netherlands) Max Verstappen	4	Ret	**8**	2	7	**1**	3	Ret	**3**	4	5	1
(Netherlands) Dennis van de Laar	1	Ret	3	4	4	3	Ret	4	5	Ret	3	Ret
(Colombia) Tatiana Calderón	Ret	1	6	5	5	6	6	6	6	9	10†	Ret
(United Kingdom) Ed Jones	6	3	2	3	6	2	5	3	8	3	2	**3**
(Italy) Raffaele Marciello	5	Ret	Ret	8	2	11	2	7	4	5	Ret	4
(Canada) Lance Stroll	7	4	4	6	3	4	Ret	2	7	**Ret**	DNS	DNS
(Poland) Alex Bosak	10	5	7	10	Ret	7	Ret	10	11	6	9†	7
(Russia) Vasily Romanov	9	6	10	10	8	8	7	8	9	Ret	6	8
(Japan) Takashi Kasai	11	7	11	11	9	9	8	9	10	7	8	6
(United Kingdom) Oliver Marriage										8	7	9
(United Kingdom) Ben Anderson	8	Ret	9									
(United Kingdom) Will Buxton				12	10	10						

Color	Result
Gold	Winner
Silver	2nd place
Bronze	3rd place
Green	4th & 5th place
Light Blue	6th–10th place
Dark Blue	Finished (Outside Top 10)
Purple	Did not finish
Red	Did not qualify (DNQ)
Brown	Withdrawn (Wth)
Black	Disqualified (DSQ)
White	Did not start (DNS)
Blank	Did not participate (DNP)
Blank	Not competing

**In-line notation**
**Bold**	Pole position
Italics	Fastest lap

† — Did not finish, but classified
