= 2013 Masters of Formula 3 =

Race details
Date	7 July 2013
Official name	Masters of Formula 3
Location	Circuit Park Zandvoort, Netherlands
Course	4.307 km (2.676 mi)
Distance	25 laps, 107.675 km (66.906 mi)

Pole
Driver	(Sweden) Felix Rosenqvist	Mücke Motorsport
Time	1:30.839

Fastest Lap
Driver	(Sweden) Felix Rosenqvist	Mücke Motorsport
Time	1:33.266 (on lap 7 of 25)

Podium
First	(Sweden) Felix Rosenqvist	Mücke Motorsport
Second	(United Kingdom) Alex Lynn	Prema Powerteam
Third	(United Kingdom) Emil Bernstorff	Prema Powerteam

The 2013 Masters of Formula 3 was the 23rd Masters of Formula 3 race held at Circuit Park Zandvoort on 7 July 2013.

== Drivers and teams ==
All cars were equipped with a Dallara F312 chassis.

Team	No	Driver	Engine	Main series
(Italy) Prema Powerteam	1	(Austria) Lucas Auer	Mercedes	FIA European Formula 3 Championship
(Italy) Prema Powerteam	2	(United Kingdom) Alex Lynn	Mercedes	FIA European Formula 3 Championship
(Italy) Prema Powerteam	3	(Italy) Eddie Cheever III	Mercedes	FIA European Formula 3 Championship
(Italy) Prema Powerteam	4	(United Kingdom) Emil Bernstorff	Mercedes	German Formula Three Championship
(Germany) KFZ-Teile24 Mücke Motorsport	5	(Sweden) Felix Rosenqvist	Mercedes	FIA European Formula 3 Championship
(Germany) KFZ-Teile24 Mücke Motorsport	6	(Israel) Roy Nissany	Mercedes	FIA European Formula 3 Championship
(Germany) KFZ-Teile24 Mücke Motorsport	7	(United States) Michael Lewis	Mercedes	FIA European Formula 3 Championship
(Germany) KFZ-Teile24 Mücke Motorsport	8	(Japan) Yuhi Sekiguchi	Mercedes	Super GT
(United Kingdom) Carlin	9	(United Kingdom) Harry Tincknell	Volkswagen	FIA European Formula 3 Championship
(United Kingdom) Carlin	10	(United Kingdom) Jordan King	Volkswagen	FIA European Formula 3 Championship
(United Kingdom) Carlin	11	(Canada) Nicholas Latifi	Volkswagen	FIA European Formula 3 Championship
(United Kingdom) Carlin	12	(United Kingdom) Jann Mardenborough	Volkswagen	FIA European Formula 3 Championship
(Italy) EuroInternational	14	(United Kingdom) Tom Blomqvist	Mercedes	FIA European Formula 3 Championship
(United Kingdom) Fortec Motorsports	15	(Puerto Rico) Félix Serrallés	Mercedes	FIA European Formula 3 Championship
(United Kingdom) Fortec Motorsports	16	(United Kingdom) Josh Hill	Mercedes	FIA European Formula 3 Championship
(United Kingdom) Fortec Motorsports	17	(United Kingdom) William Buller	Mercedes	FIA European Formula 3 Championship
(United Kingdom) Fortec Motorsports	18	(Brazil) Luís Felipe Derani	Mercedes	FIA European Formula 3 Championship
(Germany) Ma-con	19	(Germany) Sven Müller	Volkswagen	FIA European Formula 3 Championship
(Germany) Ma-con	20	(Germany) André Rudersdorf	Volkswagen	FIA European Formula 3 Championship
(Netherlands) Van Amersfoort Racing	21	(Netherlands) Dennis van de Laar	Volkswagen	FIA European Formula 3 Championship
(United Kingdom) Double R Racing	24	(Italy) Antonio Giovinazzi	Mercedes	FIA European Formula 3 Championship
(United Kingdom) Double R Racing	25	(Indonesia) Sean Gelael	Mercedes	FIA European Formula 3 Championship
(United Kingdom) Double R Racing	26	(Colombia) Tatiana Calderón	Mercedes	FIA European Formula 3 Championship
(Switzerland) Jo Zeller Racing	27	(Switzerland) Sandro Zeller	Mercedes	FIA European Formula 3 Championship
(United Kingdom) ThreeBond with T-Sport	28	(United Kingdom) Richard Goddard	Nissan	FIA European Formula 3 Championship

== Classification ==
=== Qualifying ===
Pos	No	Driver	Team	Q1	Q2
1	5	(Sweden) Felix Rosenqvist	KFZ-Teile24 Mücke Motorsport	1:30.839	1:31.080
2	9	(United Kingdom) Harry Tincknell	Carlin	1:31.131	1:31.491
3	2	(United Kingdom) Alex Lynn	Prema Powerteam	1:31.154	1:31.630
4	4	(United Kingdom) Emil Bernstorff	Prema Powerteam	1:31.255	1:31.486
5	1	(Austria) Lucas Auer	Prema Powerteam	1:31.256	1:31.488
6	19	(Germany) Sven Müller	Ma-con	1:31.363	1:32.191
7	14	(United Kingdom) Tom Blomqvist	EuroInternational	1:31.399	1:31.583
8	11	(Canada) Nicholas Latifi	Carlin	1:31.404	1:31.645
9	10	(United Kingdom) Jordan King	Carlin	1:31.414	1:31.426
10	12	(United Kingdom) Jann Mardenborough	Carlin	1:31.572	1:32.209
11	3	(Italy) Eddie Cheever III	Prema Powerteam	1:31.716	1:32.140
12	21	(Netherlands) Dennis van de Laar	Van Amersfoort Racing	1:31.927	1:31.728
13	7	(United States) Michael Lewis	KFZ-Teile24 Mücke Motorsport	1:31.916	1:32.153
14	18	(Brazil) Luís Felipe Derani	Fortec Motorsports	1:31.964	1:32.036
15	24	(Italy) Antonio Giovinazzi	Double R Racing	1:32.149	1:31.984
16	17	(United Kingdom) William Buller	Fortec Motorsports	1:32.091	1:32.011
17	16	(United Kingdom) Josh Hill	Fortec Motorsports	1:32.147	1:32.029
18	28	(United Kingdom) Richard Goddard	ThreeBond with T-Sport	1:32.279	1:33.795
19	8	(Japan) Yuhi Sekiguchi	KFZ-Teile24 Mücke Motorsport	1:32.391	1:32.905
20	20	(Germany) André Rudersdorf	Ma-con	1:32.915	1:32.548
21	25	(Indonesia) Sean Gelael	Double R Racing	1:33.523	1:32.676
22	6	(Israel) Roy Nissany	KFZ-Teile24 Mücke Motorsport	1:32.964	1:33.007
23	27	(Switzerland) Sandro Zeller	Jo Zeller Racing	1:33.052	1:33.145
24	26	(Colombia) Tatiana Calderón	Double R Racing	1:33.688	1:33.153
WD	15	(Puerto Rico) Félix Serrallés	Fortec Motorsports	Withdrew before the event	

=== Race ===
Pos	No	Driver	Team	Laps	Time/Retired	Grid
1	5	(Sweden) Felix Rosenqvist	KFZ-Teile24 Mücke Motorsport	25	0:39:28.565	1
2	2	(United Kingdom) Alex Lynn	Prema Powerteam	25	+5.787	3
3	4	(United Kingdom) Emil Bernstorff	Prema Powerteam	25	+6.698	4
4	9	(United Kingdom) Harry Tincknell	Carlin	25	+12.534	2
5	10	(United Kingdom) Jordan King	Carlin	25	+19.781	9
6	3	(Italy) Eddie Cheever III	Prema Powerteam	25	+29.274	11
7	11	(Canada) Nicholas Latifi	Carlin	25	+29.874	8
8	18	(Brazil) Luís Felipe Derani	Fortec Motorsports	25	+30.536	14
9	17	(United Kingdom) William Buller	Fortec Motorsports	25	+31.491	16
10	24	(Italy) Antonio Giovinazzi	Double R Racing	25	+34.043	15
11	21	(Netherlands) Dennis van de Laar	Van Amersfoort Racing	25	+35.260	12
12	7	(United States) Michael Lewis	KFZ-Teile24 Mücke Motorsport	25	+36.475	13
13	12	(United Kingdom) Jann Mardenborough	Carlin	25	+36.569	10
14	28	(United Kingdom) Richard Goddard	ThreeBond with T-Sport	25	+40.224	18
15	16	(United Kingdom) Josh Hill	Fortec Motorsports	25	+44.219	17
16	6	(Israel) Roy Nissany	KFZ-Teile24 Mücke Motorsport	25	+46.776	22
17	27	(Switzerland) Sandro Zeller	Jo Zeller Racing	25	+54.058	23
18	8	(Japan) Yuhi Sekiguchi	KFZ-Teile24 Mücke Motorsport	25	+54.354	19
19	20	(Germany) André Rudersdorf	Ma-con	25	+54.744	20
20	26	(Colombia) Tatiana Calderón	Double R Racing	25	+55.142	24
21	14	(United Kingdom) Tom Blomqvist	EuroInternational	22	+3 laps	7
Ret	25	(Indonesia) Sean Gelael	Double R Racing	16	Retired	21
Ret	19	(Germany) Sven Müller	Ma-con	0	Retired	6
Ret	1	(Austria) Lucas Auer	Prema Powerteam	0	Retired	5
Fastest lap: Felix Rosenqvist, 1:33.266, 166.247 km/h (103.301 mph) on lap 7
