= Tetiana Buhaiko =

Ukrainian literary critic and teacher

Tetiana Fedorivna Buhaiko (25 June 1898 — 25 October 1972) was a Ukrainian literary critic and teacher. Honored Teacher of the Ukrainian SSR (1940), Doctor of Pedagogical Sciences (1957), and Professor (1958).

== Early life and education ==
Tetiana Buhaiko was born on 25 June 1898 in Yerevan. In 1915, she successfully graduated from the gymnasium and entered the historical and philosophical faculty of the Moscow Higher Courses for Women. In 1917, Buhaiko returned to the Sumy region of the Ukrainian SSR and got a job as a teacher of the preparatory class of the Romny Real School.

Since 1925, Buhaiko taught Ukrainian language and literature at Romny secondary school. She combined work with studying at the Poltava Institute of Social Education, graduating in 1931. In 1935, Buhaiko graduated from the Nizhyn Pedagogical Institute.

== Career ==
Since 1936, Buhaiko worked as a researcher at the Ukrainian Research Institute of Pedagogy. Since 1939, Buhaiko taught at the Kyiv Pedagogical Institute and part-time at secondary school No. 59. Working at the Ukrainian Research Institute, she successfully defended her Ph.D. thesis in 1946.

From 1951 to 1954, she worked as the editor-in-chief of the magazine "Literature in the School" (later "Dyvoslovo") and the editor of the republican scientific and methodical collection "Methods of Teaching Literature."

In 1957, Buhaiko was awarded the scientific degree of Doctor of Pedagogical Sciences and the title of professor the following year. Since 1957, she has been the head of the Department of Language and Literature Methodology of the Kyiv Pedagogical Institute, named after Maksim Gorky (now National Pedagogical Drahomanov University).

Tetiana Buhaiko died on 25 October 1972 in Kyiv.

== Scientific contribution ==
Buhaiko is the author of more than 200 scientific works related to the methodology of teaching literature in secondary school, as well as textbooks for students and teachers. Among others, she compiled a textbook on Ukrainian literature for the 7th grade, which went through nine editions - from 1940 to 1952. Buhaiko was also engaged in developing tasks on the works of Taras Shevchenko for students of distance high schools.

== Personal life ==
Tetiana Buhaiko had a husband Fedir Buhaiko who was also a pedagogue and an academic.

== Awards and honors ==
- Honored Teacher of the Ukrainian SSR (1940)
- Medal "For Valiant Labour in the Great Patriotic War 1941–1945" (1946)
- Order of Lenin (1961)
- Medal of Anton Semenovych Makarenko (1967)
- Jubilee Medal "In Commemoration of the 100th Anniversary of the Birth of Vladimir Ilyich Lenin" (1970)
