= Dennis van de Laar =

Dutch racing driver

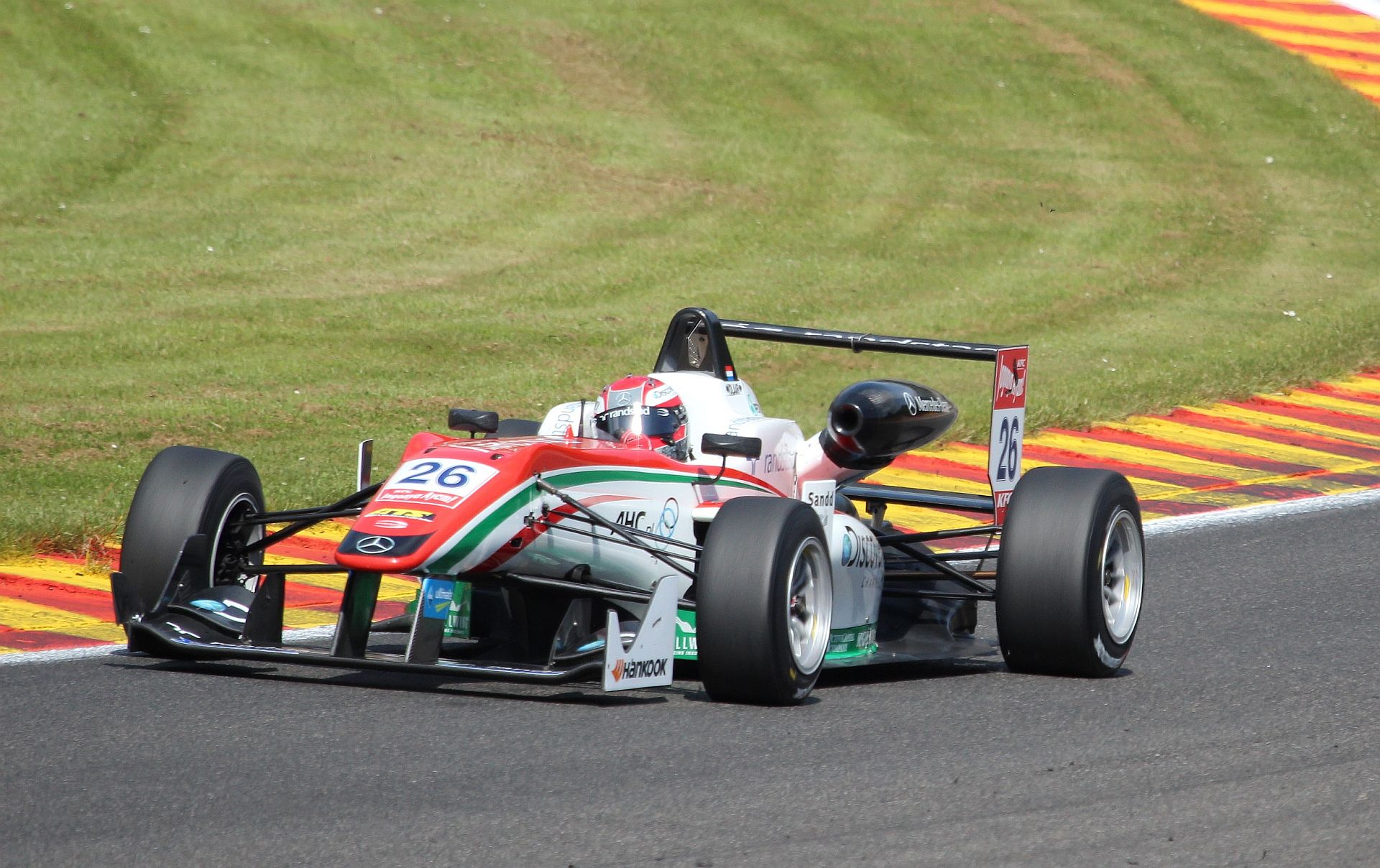
- Dennis van de Laar in 2014
- Nationality: Netherlands
- Born: Dennis Alphons Ronald van de Laar; 3 February 1994 (age 32) Haarlem (Netherlands)
- Relatives: Ronald van de Laar (father)

FIA European F3 Championship career
- Debut season: 2013
- Current team: Prema Powerteam
- Car number: 126
- Former teams: Van Amersfoort Racing
- Starts: 64
- Wins: 0
- Poles: 0
- Fastest laps: 0
- Best finish: 14th in 2014

Previous series
- 2012 2011 2010: German Formula Three; Formula Renault 2.0 NEC; Suzuki Swift Cup Netherlands

Dennis Alphons Ronald van de Laar (born 3 February 1994) is a Dutch former racing driver.

Having started racing cars in the Formido Swift Cup, where one race win helped him to third in the championship, van de Laar moved into the Formula Renault Northern European Cup in 2011 with Van Amersfoort Racing. With a best race result of sixth at Most, the Dutchman ended up seventh in the standings. The following year yielded a step-up to Formula Three, as van de Laar moved to the German F3 series. Remaining with Van Amersfoort, he finished ninth overall and scored a lone podium at his home track in Zandvoort. During the same year, van de Laar also made his debut in the Formula 3 Euro Series, as well as competing in the Masters of Formula 3 and Macau Grand Prix events.

Van de Laar undertook his final career step in 2013, driving for VAR in the FIA Formula 3 European Championship. In a competitive field, van de Laar took a total of six top-ten finishes and was classified 20th overall. He once again took part in the Masters of F3 and Macau races, finishing 11th and 18th respectively.

After taking a win and three further podium in the Florida Winter Series at the start of 2014, van de Laar returned to European F3, this time with the title-defending Prema Powerteam. Even though his results improved to 14th in the table, the Dutch driver was outclassed by his teammates, who finished the season first, fifth, and tenth respectively. Following the season, van de Laar retired from racing.

Since April 2021, van de Laar has been a shareholder in Returnista, a Dutch logistics company headquartered in Amsterdam.

== Racing record ==
=== Career summary ===
Season	Series	Team	Races	Wins	Poles	F/Laps	Podiums	Points	Position
2010	Formido Swift Cup	Wijzonol Bleekemolen Racing	14	1	1	0	5	160	**3rd**
2011	Eurocup Formula Renault 2.0	Van Amersfoort Racing	4	0	0	0	0	0	36th
2011	Formula Renault 2.0 Northern European Cup	Van Amersfoort Racing	20	0	0	0	0	186	7th
2011	Formula Renault 2.0 UK Championship	Van Amersfoort Racing	6	0	0	0	0	42	16th
2011	FIA GT3 European Championship	Aevitae Bleekemolen Racing	2	0	0	0	0	0	54th
2011	Dutch Race Drivers Organisations - Diesel class		?	?	?	?	?	?	**1st**
2012	German Formula 3 Championship	Van Amersfoort Racing	24	0	0	0	1	110	9th
2012	Formula 3 Euro Series	Van Amersfoort Racing	3	0	0	0	0	0	NC†
2012	Macau Grand Prix	Van Amersfoort Racing	1	0	0	0	0	N/A	24th
2012	Masters of Formula 3	Carlin Motorsport	1	0	0	0	0	N/A	13th
2013	FIA Formula 3 European Championship	Van Amersfoort Racing	30	0	0	0	0	22	20th
2013	Masters of Formula 3	Van Amersfoort Racing	1	0	0	0	0	N/A	11th
2013	Rolex Sports Car Series - GT	The Racer's Group	1	0	0	0	0	16	62nd
2013	Macau Grand Prix	Mücke Motorsport	1	0	0	0	0	N/A	18th
2014	FIA Formula 3 European Championship	Prema Powerteam	32	0	0	0	0	38	14th
2014	Porsche Supercup	McGregor powered by Attempto Racing	2	0	0	0	0	1	26th
2014	Florida Winter Series	Ferrari Driver Academy	12	1	0	2	4	N/A	4th
2014	Zandvoort Masters	Double R Racing	1	0	0	0	0	N/A	8th

† As van de Laar was a guest driver, he was ineligible to score points.

=== Complete Eurocup Formula Renault 2.0 results ===
(key) (Races in bold indicate pole position; races in italics indicate fastest lap)

Year	Entrant	1	2	3	4	5	6	7	8	9	10	11	12	13	14	DC	Points
2011	Van Amersfoort Racing	ALC; 1	ALC; 2	SPA; 1; 18	SPA; 2; 18	NÜR; 1	NÜR; 2	HUN; 1	HUN; 2	SIL; 1; 16	SIL; 2 Ret	LEC; 1	LEC; 2	CAT; 1	CAT; 2	36th	0

=== Complete Formula Renault 2.0 NEC results ===
(key) (Races in bold indicate pole position) (Races in italics indicate fastest lap)

Year	Entrant	1	2	3	4	5	6	7	8	9	10	11	12	13	14	15	16	17	18	19	20	DC	Points
2011	Van Amersfoort Racing	HOC; 1; 7	HOC; 2; 16	HOC; 3 Ret	SPA; 1; 18	SPA; 2; 18	NÜR; 1 Ret	NÜR; 2; 22	ASS; 1; 7	ASS; 2; 11	ASS; 3; 7	OSC; 1; 9	OSC; 2; 7	ZAN; 1; 11	ZAN; 2 Ret	MST; 1; 9	MST; 2; 13	MST; 3; 6	MNZ; 1; 9	MNZ; 2; 10	MNZ; 3; 11	7th	186

=== Complete FIA European Formula 3 Championship results ===
Year	Entrant	Engine	1	2	3	4	5	6	7	8	9	10	11	12	13	14	15	16	17	18	19	20	21	22	23	24	25	26	27	28	29	30	31	32	33	DC	Points
2013	Van Amersfoort Racing	Volkswagen	MNZ; 1; 9	MNZ; 2; 10	MNZ; 3 Ret	SIL; 1; 18	SIL; 2; 12	SIL; 3 Ret	HOC; 1; 13	HOC; 2; 6	HOC; 3; 14	BRH; 1 Ret	BRH; 2; 17	BRH; 3 Ret	RBR; 1; 23	RBR; 2; 25	RBR; 3 Ret	NOR; 1 Ret	NOR; 2; 18	NOR; 3; 13	NÜR; 1; 23	NÜR; 2; 19	NÜR; 3; 15	ZAN; 1; 11	ZAN; 2; 15	ZAN; 3; 23	VAL; 1; 14	VAL; 2; 16	VAL; 3; 9	HOC; 1; 8	HOC; 2; 9	HOC; 3; 12				20th	22
2014	Prema Powerteam	Mercedes	SIL; 1; 11	SIL; 2; 9	SIL; 3; 20	HOC; 1; 19	HOC; 2; 12	HOC; 3; 13	PAU; 1; 13	PAU; 2; 5	PAU; 3; 7	HUN; 1; 8	HUN; 2; 12	HUN; 3; 14	SPA; 1; 17	SPA; 2; 14	SPA; 3; 20	NOR; 1 Ret	NOR; 2; 12	NOR; 3 DNS	MSC; 1; 12	MSC; 2; 9	MSC; 3; 6	RBR; 1; 8	RBR; 2 Ret	RBR; 3; 14	NÜR; 1; 11	NÜR; 2; 12	NÜR; 3 Ret	IMO; 1; 12	IMO; 2; 11	IMO; 3; 13	HOC; 1; 17	HOC; 2; 10	HOC; 3; 10	14th	38
