= Florida Winter Series =

Single-Seater Racing Category)

- Category: Formula racing
- Country: United States
- Region: Florida
- Inaugural season: 2014
- Folded: 2014
- Drivers: 14 (2014)
- Constructors: Tatuus
- Engine suppliers: Fiat-FPT
- Tyre suppliers: Hankook

The Florida Winter Series was a non-championship, single-seater racing series organised by the Ferrari Driver Academy that was created to give young drivers experience away from main-season competition. The series was launched on October 18, 2013 and held its inaugural and only season in 2014.

== The car ==
The series used the Tatuus FA010B chassis, which was built to Formula 3 safety regulations and used in Formula Abarth, as well as other regional championships. The car is powered by a 1400cc Fiat-FPT engine producing 190hp.

== Cancellation ==
After reducing the cost of entry and shortening the number of rounds held, Ferrari announced on November 6, 2014 they had cancelled the 2015 season. Though there were intentions to hold another season in 2016, it never came to fruition.
