= Van Laar equation =

Mathematical model of the thermodynamic activity of phase equilibria of liquid mixtures

The Van Laar equation is a thermodynamic activity model, which was developed by Johannes van Laar in 1910-1913, to describe phase equilibria of liquid mixtures. The equation was derived from the Van der Waals equation. The original van der Waals parameters didn't give good description of vapor-liquid equilibria of phases, which forced the user to fit the parameters to experimental results. Because of this, the model lost the connection to molecular properties, and therefore it has to be regarded as an empirical model to correlate experimental results.

== Equations ==
Van Laar derived the excess enthalpy from the van der Waals equation:

$$H^{ex}= \frac {b_1 X_1 b_2 X_2}{b_1 X_1 +b_2 X_2} \left( \frac{\sqrt{a_1}}{b_1}- \frac{\sqrt{a_2}}{b_2} \right)^2$$

In here a_{i} and b_{i} are the van der Waals parameters for attraction and excluded volume of component i. He used the conventional quadratic mixing rule for the energy parameter a and the linear mixing rule for the size parameter b. Since these parameters didn't lead to good phase equilibrium description the model was reduced to the form:

$$\frac{G^{ex}}{RT}= \frac {A_{12} X_1 A_{21}X_2}{A_{12} X_1 +A_{21} X_2}$$

In here A_{12} and A_{21} are the van Laar coefficients, which are obtained by regression of experimental vapor–liquid equilibrium data.

The activity coefficient of component i is derived by differentiation to x_{i}. This yields:

$$\left\{\begin{matrix} \ln\ \gamma_1=A_{12} \left( \frac{A_{21} X_2}{A_{12} X_1 +A_{21} X_2} \right)^2
\\ \ln\ \gamma_2=A_{21} \left (\frac{A_{12} X_1} { A_{12} X_1 +A_{21} X_2} \right)^2
\end{matrix}\right.$$

This shows that the van Laar coefficients A_{12} and A_{21} are equal to logarithmic limiting activity coefficients $\ln \left( \gamma_1^\infty \right)$ and $\ln \left( \gamma_2^\infty \right)$ respectively. The model gives increasing (A_{12} and A_{21} >0) or only decreasing (A_{12} and A_{21} <0) activity coefficients with decreasing concentration. The model can not describe extrema in the activity coefficient along the concentration range.

In case $A_{12}=A_{21}=A$, which implies that the molecules are of equal size but different in polarity, then the equations become:

$$\left\{\begin{matrix}  \ln\ \gamma_1=Ax^2_2
\\  \ln\ \gamma_2=Ax^2_1
\end{matrix}\right.$$

In this case the activity coefficients mirror at x_{1}=0.5. When A=0, the activity coefficients are unity, thus describing an ideal mixture.

=== Recommended values ===
An extensive range of recommended values for the Van Laar coefficients can be found in the literature. Selected values are provided in the table below.

System	A_{12}	A_{21}
Acetone(1)-Chloroform(2)	-0.8643	-0.5899
Acetone(1)-Methanol(2)	0.6184	0.5797
Acetone(1)-Water(2)	2.1041	1.5555
Carbon tetrachloride(1)-Benzene (2)	0.0951	0.0911
Chloroform(1)-Methanol(2)	0.9356	1.8860
Ethanol(1)-Benzene(2)	1.8570	1.4785
Ethanol(1)-Water(2)	1.6798	0.9227

== See also ==
- Margules activity model
