= Johannes van Laar =

Dutch chemist (1860-1938)

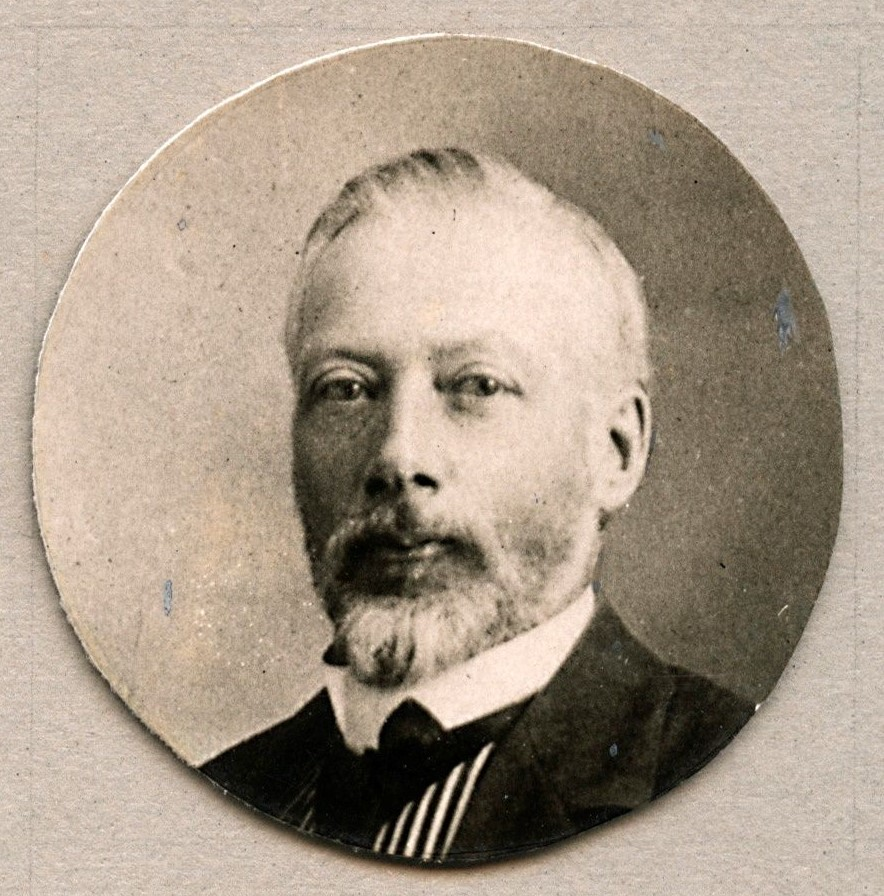
- Van Laar in 1914
- Born: 10 July 1860; The Hague, Netherlands
- Died: 9 December 1938 (aged 78); Montreux, Switzerland
- Education: University of Amsterdam
- Known for: Van Laar equation
- Scientific career
- Fields: Chemistry
- Workplaces: University of Amsterdam

Johannes van Laar (10 July 1860 – 9 December 1938) was a Dutch chemist who is best known for the equations regarding chemical activity. Van Laar equation is named after him.

== Biography ==
Van Laar's parents died when he was still a minor, his mother in 1862 when he was about 2-years-old and his father in 1873 when he was about 13-years-old. From that point on his uncle N. A. Rost van Tonningen was responsible for him. He finished school in 1876 and joined the Royal Naval Institute at Willemsoord. After several trips on steam ships and reaching the rank of a sub-lieutenant he asked for discharge when he became of age.

Van Laar started his studies of physics, chemistry and mathematics at the University of Amsterdam in 1891. Johannes van der Waals, and Jacobus Henricus van 't Hoff both were professors at that University in that time.

His education deprived him from obtaining a Ph.D. and therefore a career at a Dutch University was nearly impossible. After being a teacher at a middle school he became unsalaried lecturer at the University of Amsterdam 1898 and assistant of Bakhuis Roozeboom in 1902. Van der Waals opposed several of the promotions of Van Laar, for example becoming a paid lecturer in 1902 and after the death of Roozeboom the attempt to get lecturer for mathematical chemistry in 1907. Van Laar was appointed lecturer of mathematics in 1907 but was rejected becoming professor in 1910. This rejection lead to a mental breakdown and had to resign his position. He went to Tavel-sur-Clarens in Switzerland until his death in 1938, at 78 years old.

In 1930 he became a member of the Royal Netherlands Academy of Arts and Sciences.

== See also ==
- Computational thermodynamics
