= Timothy Van Laar =

American artist

"Mapping", 2006, from a private collection in Grosse Pointe, Michigan

Timothy Van Laar (born 1951 in Ann Arbor, Michigan) is an American artist, writer and full-time professor.

== Art career ==
Van Laar produces art works in multiple formats including, paintings, drawings and installation pieces many of which have been exhibited throughout North America and Europe. He has received fellowships and grants and other support from multiple organizations including Fulbright, Yaddo, the Howard Foundation, the Illinois Arts Council, and the Pew Charitable Trusts. Some of the most well known works are the postcard paintings Van Laar has been featured in exhibits at major art museums, including The Detroit Institute of Arts.

Van Laar's most recent artworks deal with the nature of representation in painting. A single painting merges multiple historical approaches to how paint is applied, how paintings create meaning, and how paintings define their subject matter.

== Writing ==
He is the co-author of three books with Leonard Diepeveen: Active Sights: Art as Social Interaction, Art with a Difference: Looking at Difficult and Unfamiliar Art and Artworld Prestige: Arguing Cultural Value. Other works include reviews and numerous essays.

== Education and professional positions ==
Currently, Van Laar resides in Detroit, Michigan. He attended Calvin College for his undergraduate degree and obtained his MFA degree at Wayne State University. For 32 years, he was a professor of art in the School of Art and Design at the University of Illinois at Urbana-Champaign. Currently, he is Professor and Chair of Fine Arts at the College for Creative Studies in Detroit.
