= Roelof van Laar =

Dutch politician

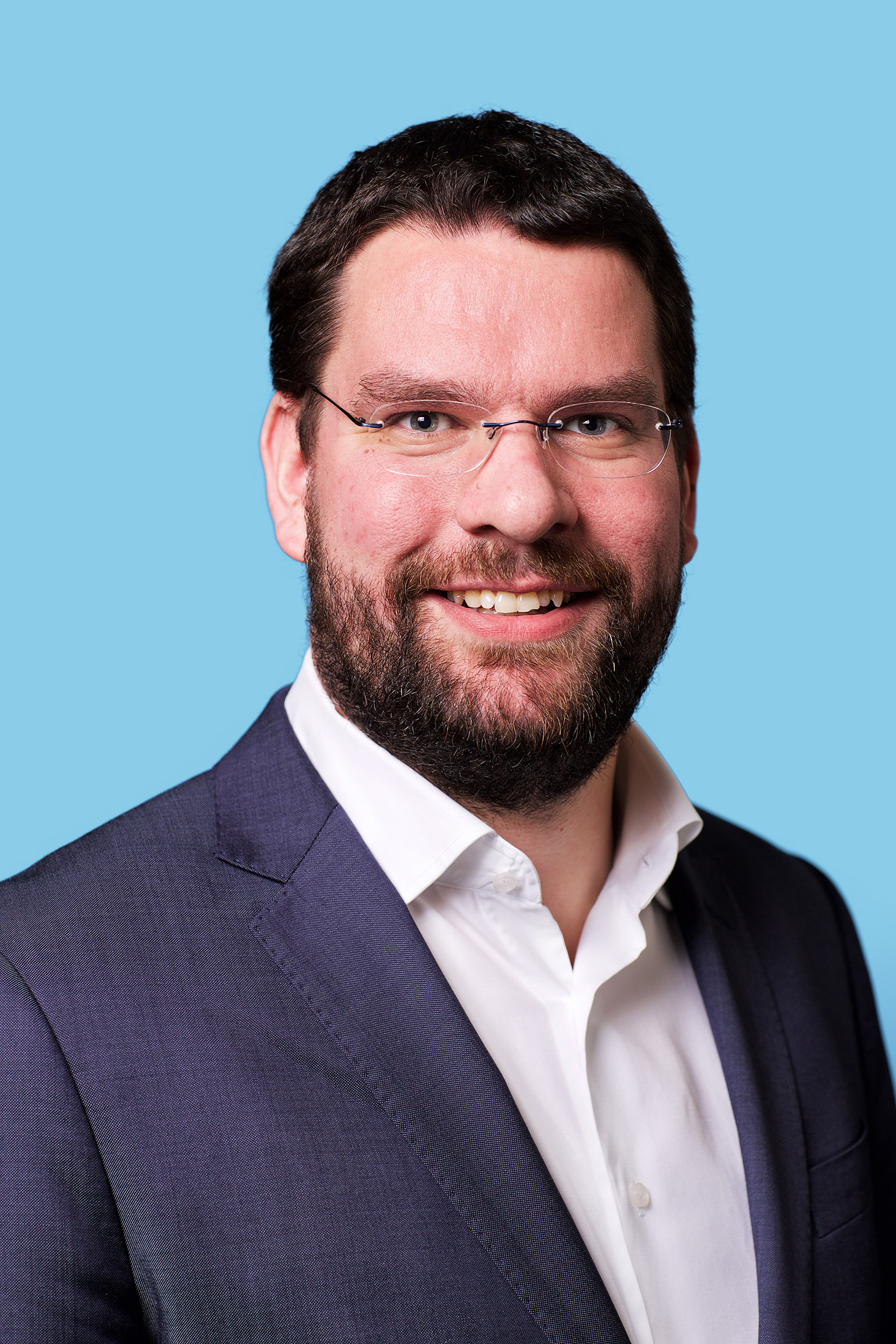
- Roelof van Laar in 2016

Member of the House of Representatives
- In office 14 May 2013 – 23 March 2017

Member of the municipal council of Leiden
- In office 10 February 2011 – 11 October 2012
- In office 16 March 2006 – 11 March 2010

Personal details
- Born: Roelof Peter van Laar; 19 May 1981 (age 44) Berkel en Rodenrijs, Netherlands
- Party: Labour Party

Roelof Peter van Laar (born 19 May 1981) is a Dutch politician. As a member of the Labour Party (Partij van de Arbeid) he was an MP between 14 May 2013 and 23 March 2017. At first he temporarily replaced Lea Bouwmeester who was on maternity leave. From 2006 to 2010 and from 2011 to 2012, he was a member of the municipal council of Leiden.

From 2008 to 2013 he was director of a foundation involving stopping child sexual abuse. He was also co-founder of this foundation.

Van Laar studied political science at Leiden University and is studying for an MBA at Webster University.

In 2015 there were reservations about his policy because he is not asking critical questions about the output of development aid.
