= 2013 FIA Formula 3 European Championship =

European motor racing competition for formula racing cars

Seasons
- ← 2012 2014 →

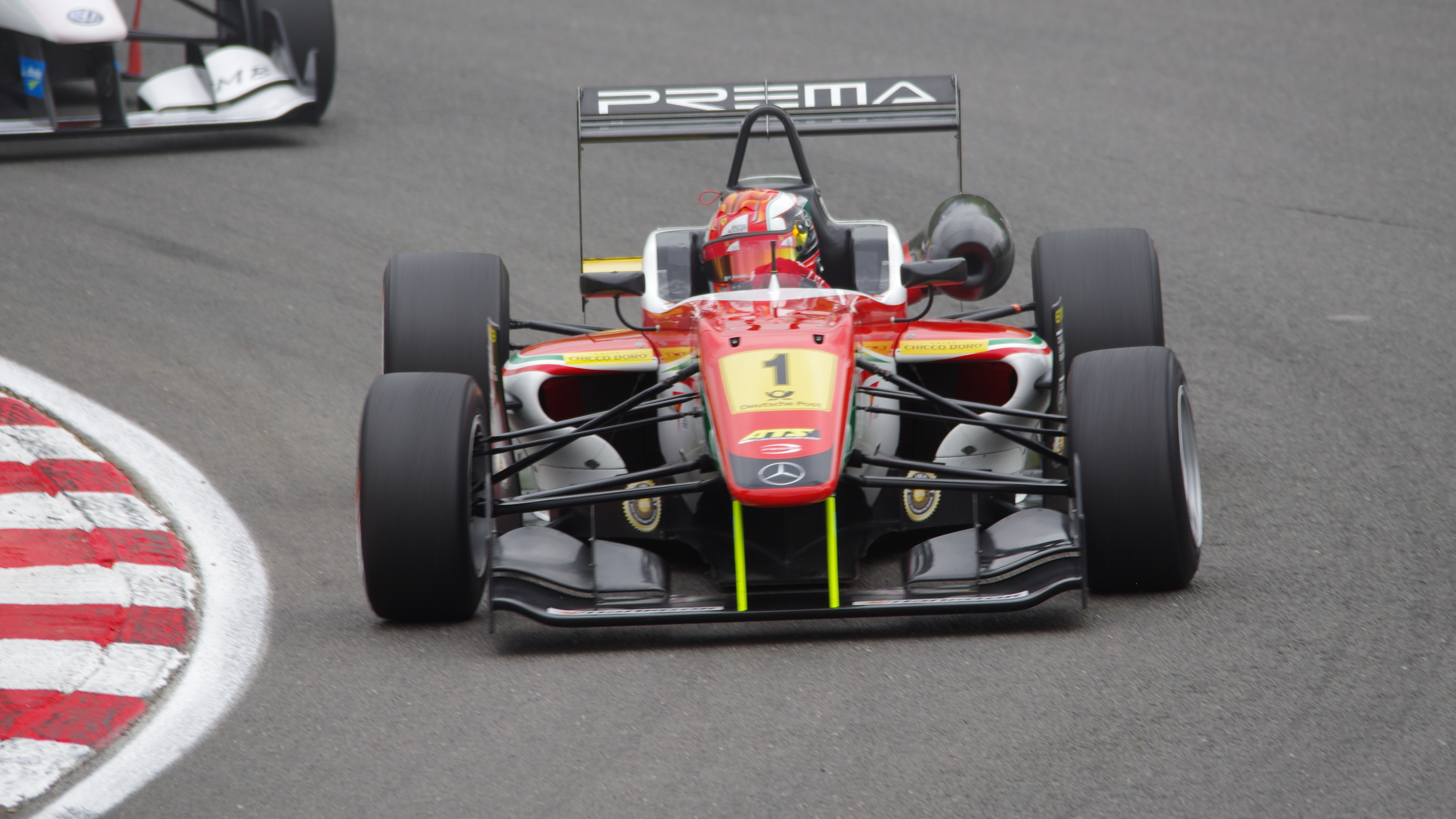
2013 champion Raffaele Marciello

The 2013 FIA Formula 3 European Championship was a multi-event motor racing championship for open wheel, formula racing cars held across Europe. The championship featured drivers competing in 2-litre Formula Three Dallara single seat race cars that conform to the technical regulations for the championship. The 2013 season was the second edition of the FIA Formula 3 European Championship, and saw the FIA formally absorb the Formula 3 Euro Series. The season began at Autodromo Nazionale Monza on 23 March and finished on 20 October at Hockenheimring. The series formed part of the Deutsche Tourenwagen Masters meetings at seven triple header events, with other triple header events as part of the World Touring Car Championship, the FIA World Endurance Championship and the Superstars Series.

The championship was won by 2012 runner-up Raffaele Marciello, driving for Prema Powerteam. Mücke's Felix Rosenqvist finished behind Marciello for the second year in a row, finishing 32.5 points behind. Marciello's teammates Alex Lynn and Lucas Auer finished third and fourth respectively, allowing Prema to clinch the teams' championship. Carlin's driver Harry Tincknell completed the top five with a win at his home round at Silverstone. Non-regular drivers Pascal Wehrlein – prior to moving into the DTM – and Daniil Kvyat were the only drivers outside the top five, who took a race win.

== Drivers and teams ==
All cars were equipped with Hankook tyres.

| Team | Chassis (Note: All drivers competed in Dallara chassis; model listed.) | Engine | No. | Driver | Rounds |
|---|---|---|---|---|---|
| (Italy) Prema Powerteam | F312/030 | Mercedes | 1 | (Italy) Raffaele Marciello | All |
| (Italy) Prema Powerteam | F312/014 | Mercedes | 2 | (United Kingdom) Alex Lynn (Note: Ineligible to score points for the team in the teams' championship at rounds 5, 8–10.) | All |
| (Italy) Prema Powerteam | F312/005 | Mercedes | 24 | (Austria) Lucas Auer (Note: Ineligible to score points for the team in the teams' championship at rounds 1–4, 6–7, 10) | All |
| (Italy) Prema Powerteam | F312/015 | Mercedes | 25 | (Italy) Eddie Cheever III (Note: Ineligible to score points for the team in the teams' championship at rounds 1–9) | All |
| (United Kingdom) Carlin | F312/010 | Volkswagen | 3 | (United Kingdom) Harry Tincknell | All |
| (United Kingdom) Carlin | F312/004 | Volkswagen | 4 | (United Kingdom) Jordan King (Note: Ineligible to score points for the team in the teams' championship at round 6) | All |
| (United Kingdom) Carlin | F312/001 | Volkswagen | 26 | (Canada) Nicholas Latifi (Note: Ineligible to score points for the team in the teams' championship at rounds 1–5, 7–10) | All |
| (United Kingdom) Carlin | F312/040 | Volkswagen | 27 | (United Kingdom) Jann Mardenborough (Note: Ineligible to score points for the team in the teams' championship.) | All |
| (United Kingdom) Carlin | F312/016 | Volkswagen | 51 | (Russia) Daniil Kvyat (Note: Ineligible to score any championship points.) | 3–9 |
| (United Kingdom) Carlin | F312/016 | Volkswagen | 51 | (New Zealand) Nick Cassidy | 10 |
| (Germany) kfzteile24 Mücke Motorsport | F312/023 | Mercedes | 5 | (Germany) Pascal Wehrlein | 1 |
| (Germany) kfzteile24 Mücke Motorsport | F312/023 | Mercedes | 5 | (United States) Michael Lewis (Note: Ineligible to score points for the team in the teams' championship at round 10) | 2–10 |
| (Germany) kfzteile24 Mücke Motorsport | F312/004 | Mercedes | 6 | (Sweden) Felix Rosenqvist | All |
| (Germany) kfzteile24 Mücke Motorsport | F312/019 | Mercedes | 28 | (Australia) Mitchell Gilbert (Note: Ineligible to score points for the team in the teams' championship at rounds 1–9) | All |
| (Germany) kfzteile24 Mücke Motorsport | F312/039 | Mercedes | 29 | (Israel) Roy Nissany | All |
| (Germany) ma-con | F312/045 | Volkswagen | 7 | (Germany) Sven Müller | 1–7 |
| (Germany) ma-con | F312/045 | Volkswagen | 7 | (Monaco) Stefano Coletti | 10 |
| (Germany) ma-con | F312/046 | Volkswagen | 8 | (Germany) André Rudersdorf | All |
| (Germany) URD Rennsport | F312/011 | Mercedes | 9 | (Germany) Lucas Wolf | All |
| (Switzerland) Jo Zeller Racing | F312/048 | Mercedes | 10 | (Switzerland) Sandro Zeller | All |
| (United Kingdom) Fortec Motorsports | F312/007 | Mercedes | 11 | (United States) Félix Serrallés (Note: Serrallés is a Puerto Rican driver who raced this year under American racing license.) | All |
| (United Kingdom) Fortec Motorsports | F312/003 | Mercedes | 12 | (Brazil) Luis Felipe Derani (Note: Ineligible to score points for the team in the teams' championship at round 5) | All |
| (United Kingdom) Fortec Motorsports | F312/036 | Mercedes | 30 | (United Kingdom) Josh Hill | 1–5 |
| (United Kingdom) Fortec Motorsports | F312/035 | Mercedes | 30 | (Sweden) John Bryant-Meisner | 9–10 |
| (United Kingdom) Fortec Motorsports | F312/035 | Mercedes | 31 | (Russia) Dmitry Suranovich | 1 |
| (United Kingdom) Fortec Motorsports | F312/035 | Mercedes | 31 | (United Arab Emirates) Edward Jones | 3 |
| (United Kingdom) Fortec Motorsports | F312/035 | Mercedes | 31 | (United Kingdom) William Buller | 5 |
| (United Kingdom) Fortec Motorsports | F312/035 | Mercedes | 31 | (Mexico) Alfonso Celis Jr. | 8 |
| (United Kingdom) ThreeBond with T-Sport | F312/008 | ThreeBond Nissan | 14 | (United Kingdom) William Buller | 1–4 |
| (United Kingdom) ThreeBond with T-Sport | F312/008 | ThreeBond Nissan | 14 | (United Kingdom) Alexander Sims | 6–9 |
| (United Kingdom) ThreeBond with T-Sport | F312/008 | ThreeBond Nissan | 14 | (Estonia) Kevin Korjus | 10 |
| (United Kingdom) ThreeBond with T-Sport | F312/049 | ThreeBond Nissan | 15 | (United Kingdom) Richard Goddard | All |
| (United Kingdom) Double R Racing | F312/043 | Mercedes | 16 | (Colombia) Tatiana Calderón | All |
| (United Kingdom) Double R Racing | F312/009 | Mercedes | 17 | (Italy) Antonio Giovinazzi | All |
| (United Kingdom) Double R Racing | F312/004 | Mercedes | 32 | (Indonesia) Sean Gelael | All |
| (Netherlands) Van Amersfoort Racing | F312/052 | Volkswagen | 18 | (Netherlands) Dennis van de Laar | All |
| (Netherlands) Van Amersfoort Racing | F312/051 | Volkswagen | 19 | (Sweden) Måns Grenhagen | 1–5 |
| (Netherlands) Van Amersfoort Racing | F312/051 | Volkswagen | 19 | (Germany) Sven Müller | 8–10 |
| (Italy) EuroInternational | F312/053 | Mercedes | 20 | (United Kingdom) Tom Blomqvist | All |
| (Italy) EuroInternational | F312/003 | Mercedes | 52 | (New Zealand) Nick Cassidy | 6 |
| (Italy) Romeo Ferraris | F312/003 | Mercedes | 22 | (Japan) Gary Thompson (Note: Thompson is an Irish driver who raced this year under Japanese racing license.) | 1–2 |
| (Italy) Romeo Ferraris | F312/001 | Mercedes | 23 | (Italy) Michela Cerruti | 1, 4, 6 |

=== Driver changes ===
- Hannes van Asseldonk announced that he retired from racing at the end of the 2012 season.
- After two races for Van Amersfoort Racing in 2012, Lucas Auer switched to Prema Powerteam in 2013.
- 2012 ma-con Motorsport driver Emil Bernstorff, had lost his seat at the team and signed with Lotus in German Formula Three.
- Tom Blomqvist, who competed for ma-con Motorsport in 2012, moved to EuroInternational, who are making their début in the championship in 2013.
- Richard Bradley left the championship to take part in a full Super Formula season with KCMG in 2013.
- William Buller, who drove for Carlin in 2012, switched to the ThreeBond with T-Sport team.
- Newcomers Double R Racing signed European F3 Open driver Tatiana Calderón and Formula Pilota China frontrunners Sean Gelael and Antonio Giovinazzi.
- Superstars Series team Romeo Ferraris joined the championship, with their 2011 Superstars driver Michela Cerruti signed as their first driver.
- Italian Formula Three drivers Eddie Cheever III and Nicholas Latifi joined Prema Powerteam and Carlin respectively.
- 2012 Carlin drivers Pietro Fantin and Jazeman Jaafar left the series, switching to Formula Renault 3.5.
- Mitchell Gilbert and Roy Nissany made their debut in the series for Mücke Motorsport, moving from German Formula Three and ADAC Formel Masters respectively.
- Måns Grenhagen moved from European F3 Open to the championship, racing for Van Amersfoort Racing.
- Josh Hill, who drove for Fortec Motorsports in the 2012 Formula Renault 2.0 Northern European Cup, continued his association with the team, in 2013.
- Ed Jones will take Dmitry Suranovich's seat at the Fortec Motorsports team at the first Hockenheimring round.
- Daniel Juncadella, who won the 2012 championship with Prema Powerteam, left the series, joining Mercedes-Benz in the Deutsche Tourenwagen Masters.
- Jordan King, the 2012 Formula Renault 2.0 NEC runner-up, entered the series with Carlin.
- Daniil Kvyat joined Carlin for a one-off as the fifth driver of the team at the first Hockenheimring round. Later he announced he made a deal to stay with the team for the rest of the season.
- Michael Lewis lost his seat at Prema Powerteam. Later, he was announced at Mücke Motorsport as the replacement for DTM-bound Pascal Wehrlein.
- Alex Lynn switched from Fortec Motorsports to Prema Powerteam.
- After placing sixth in the GT3 class of the 2012 British GT Championship, Jann Mardenborough made his Formula Three debut, driving for Carlin.
- After one season with Prema Powerteam in 2012, Sven Müller switched to ma-con Motorsport for 2013.
- Jo Zeller Racing's Andrea Roda moved to the Auto GP with Virtuosi UK.
- German Formula Three Trophy Class champion André Rudersdorf graduated to the championship with ma-con Motorsport.
- Angolan driver Luís Sá Silva and Carlin driver Carlos Sainz Jr. moved to the GP3 Series, driving for Carlin and MW Arden respectively.
- GP3 Series driver Dmitry Suranovich switched to the championship with Fortec Motorsports.
- After three seasons competing in the All-Japan Formula Three Championship national class, Gary Thompson entered the series with Romeo Ferraris, competing with a Japanese racing licence.

== Calendar ==
A provisional ten-round calendar was announced on 18 November 2012. This was modified on 19 December 2012, after DTM organisers moved the Norisring event back by a week to avoid a clash with the German Grand Prix. To accommodate the change of date, the Zandvoort meeting was moved from July to September. On 1 June 2013, the Le Castellet round was removed from the calendar, and was ultimately replaced by a round at Vallelunga.

| Rnd | Race | Circuit/Location | Date | Supporting |
|---|---|---|---|---|
| 1 | 1 | (Italy) Autodromo Nazionale Monza, Monza | 23 March | FIA WTCC Race of Italy |
| 1 | 2 | (Italy) Autodromo Nazionale Monza, Monza | 24 March | FIA WTCC Race of Italy |
| 1 | 3 | (Italy) Autodromo Nazionale Monza, Monza | 24 March | FIA WTCC Race of Italy |
| 2 | 4 | (United Kingdom) Silverstone Circuit, Silverstone | 13 April | 6 Hours of Silverstone |
| 2 | 5 | (United Kingdom) Silverstone Circuit, Silverstone | 13 April | 6 Hours of Silverstone |
| 2 | 6 | (United Kingdom) Silverstone Circuit, Silverstone | 14 April | 6 Hours of Silverstone |
| 3 | 7 | (Germany) Hockenheimring, Baden-Württemberg | 4 May | Deutsche Tourenwagen Masters |
| 3 | 8 | (Germany) Hockenheimring, Baden-Württemberg | 4 May | Deutsche Tourenwagen Masters |
| 3 | 9 | (Germany) Hockenheimring, Baden-Württemberg | 5 May | Deutsche Tourenwagen Masters |
| 4 | 10 | (United Kingdom) Brands Hatch, Kent | 18 May | Deutsche Tourenwagen Masters |
| 4 | 11 | (United Kingdom) Brands Hatch, Kent | 18 May | Deutsche Tourenwagen Masters |
| 4 | 12 | (United Kingdom) Brands Hatch, Kent | 19 May | Deutsche Tourenwagen Masters |
| 5 | 13 | (Austria) Red Bull Ring, Spielberg | 1 June | Deutsche Tourenwagen Masters |
| 5 | 14 | (Austria) Red Bull Ring, Spielberg | 1 June | Deutsche Tourenwagen Masters |
| 5 | 15 | (Austria) Red Bull Ring, Spielberg | 2 June | Deutsche Tourenwagen Masters |
| 6 | 16 | (Germany) Norisring, Nuremberg | 13 July | Deutsche Tourenwagen Masters |
| 6 | 17 | (Germany) Norisring, Nuremberg | 13 July | Deutsche Tourenwagen Masters |
| 6 | 18 | (Germany) Norisring, Nuremberg | 14 July | Deutsche Tourenwagen Masters |
| 7 | 19 | (Germany) Nürburgring, Rhineland-Palatinate | 17 August | Deutsche Tourenwagen Masters |
| 7 | 20 | (Germany) Nürburgring, Rhineland-Palatinate | 17 August | Deutsche Tourenwagen Masters |
| 7 | 21 | (Germany) Nürburgring, Rhineland-Palatinate | 18 August | Deutsche Tourenwagen Masters |
| 8 | 22 | (Netherlands) Circuit Park Zandvoort, Noord-Holland | 28 September | Deutsche Tourenwagen Masters |
| 8 | 23 | (Netherlands) Circuit Park Zandvoort, Noord-Holland | 28 September | Deutsche Tourenwagen Masters |
| 8 | 24 | (Netherlands) Circuit Park Zandvoort, Noord-Holland | 29 September | Deutsche Tourenwagen Masters |
| 9 | 25 | (Italy) Autodromo Vallelunga "Piero Taruffi", Campagnano | 12 October | Superstars Series |
| 9 | 26 | (Italy) Autodromo Vallelunga "Piero Taruffi", Campagnano | 13 October | Superstars Series |
| 9 | 27 | (Italy) Autodromo Vallelunga "Piero Taruffi", Campagnano | 13 October | Superstars Series |
| 10 | 28 | (Germany) Hockenheimring, Baden-Württemberg | 19 October | Deutsche Tourenwagen Masters |
| 10 | 29 | (Germany) Hockenheimring, Baden-Württemberg | 19 October | Deutsche Tourenwagen Masters |
| 10 | 30 | (Germany) Hockenheimring, Baden-Württemberg | 20 October | Deutsche Tourenwagen Masters |

== Results ==
| Round | | Circuit | Pole position | Fastest lap | Winning driver | Winning team |
|---|---|---|---|---|---|---|
| 1 | R1 | (Italy) Autodromo Nazionale Monza | (Germany) Pascal Wehrlein | (Germany) Pascal Wehrlein | (Italy) Raffaele Marciello | (Italy) Prema Powerteam |
| 1 | R2 | (Italy) Autodromo Nazionale Monza | (Germany) Pascal Wehrlein | (Germany) Pascal Wehrlein | (Germany) Pascal Wehrlein | (Germany) kfzteile24 Mücke Motorsport |
| 1 | R3 | (Italy) Autodromo Nazionale Monza | (Italy) Raffaele Marciello | (Italy) Raffaele Marciello | (Italy) Raffaele Marciello | (Italy) Prema Powerteam |
| 2 | R1 | (United Kingdom) Silverstone Circuit | (United Kingdom) Harry Tincknell | (Austria) Lucas Auer | (United Kingdom) Harry Tincknell | (United Kingdom) Carlin |
| 2 | R2 | (United Kingdom) Silverstone Circuit | (United Kingdom) Harry Tincknell | (United Kingdom) Alex Lynn | (Sweden) Felix Rosenqvist | (Germany) kfzteile24 Mücke Motorsport |
| 2 | R3 | (United Kingdom) Silverstone Circuit | (United Kingdom) Alex Lynn | (United States) Félix Serrallés | (Italy) Raffaele Marciello | (Italy) Prema Powerteam |
| 3 | R1 | (Germany) Hockenheimring | (Italy) Raffaele Marciello | (Italy) Raffaele Marciello | (Italy) Raffaele Marciello | (Italy) Prema Powerteam |
| 3 | R2 | (Germany) Hockenheimring | (Italy) Raffaele Marciello | (Italy) Raffaele Marciello | (Italy) Raffaele Marciello | (Italy) Prema Powerteam |
| 3 | R3 | (Germany) Hockenheimring | (Russia) Daniil Kvyat | (United Kingdom) Jordan King | (Sweden) Felix Rosenqvist | (Germany) kfzteile24 Mücke Motorsport |
| 4 | R1 | (United Kingdom) Brands Hatch | (United Kingdom) Alex Lynn | (United Kingdom) Alex Lynn | (United Kingdom) Alex Lynn | (Italy) Prema Powerteam |
| 4 | R2 | (United Kingdom) Brands Hatch | (United Kingdom) Alex Lynn | (Italy) Raffaele Marciello | (Italy) Raffaele Marciello | (Italy) Prema Powerteam |
| 4 | R3 | (United Kingdom) Brands Hatch | (United Kingdom) Alex Lynn | (Italy) Raffaele Marciello | (Austria) Lucas Auer | (Italy) Prema Powerteam |
| 5 | R1 | (Austria) Red Bull Ring | (Russia) Daniil Kvyat | (Sweden) Felix Rosenqvist | (Sweden) Felix Rosenqvist | (Germany) kfzteile24 Mücke Motorsport |
| 5 | R2 | (Austria) Red Bull Ring | (Russia) Daniil Kvyat | (Sweden) Felix Rosenqvist | (Sweden) Felix Rosenqvist | (Germany) kfzteile24 Mücke Motorsport |
| 5 | R3 | (Austria) Red Bull Ring | (Russia) Daniil Kvyat | (Sweden) Felix Rosenqvist | (Sweden) Felix Rosenqvist | (Germany) kfzteile24 Mücke Motorsport |
| 6 | R1 | (Germany) Norisring | (Sweden) Felix Rosenqvist | (Austria) Lucas Auer | (Italy) Raffaele Marciello | (Italy) Prema Powerteam |
| 6 | R2 | (Germany) Norisring | (Italy) Raffaele Marciello | (Italy) Raffaele Marciello | (United Kingdom) Alex Lynn | (Italy) Prema Powerteam |
| 6 | R3 | (Germany) Norisring | (Italy) Raffaele Marciello | (Sweden) Felix Rosenqvist | (Sweden) Felix Rosenqvist | (Germany) kfzteile24 Mücke Motorsport |
| 7 | R1 | (Germany) Nürburgring | (Italy) Raffaele Marciello | (Italy) Raffaele Marciello | (Italy) Raffaele Marciello | (Italy) Prema Powerteam |
| 7 | R2 | (Germany) Nürburgring | (Italy) Raffaele Marciello | (Sweden) Felix Rosenqvist | (Italy) Raffaele Marciello | (Italy) Prema Powerteam |
| 7 | R3 | (Germany) Nürburgring | (Italy) Raffaele Marciello | (Italy) Raffaele Marciello | (Italy) Raffaele Marciello | (Italy) Prema Powerteam |
| 8 | R1 | (Netherlands) Circuit Park Zandvoort | (Russia) Daniil Kvyat | (Russia) Daniil Kvyat | (Russia) Daniil Kvyat | (United Kingdom) Carlin |
| 8 | R2 | (Netherlands) Circuit Park Zandvoort | (Sweden) Felix Rosenqvist | (Sweden) Felix Rosenqvist | (Sweden) Felix Rosenqvist | (Germany) kfzteile24 Mücke Motorsport |
| 8 | R3 | (Netherlands) Circuit Park Zandvoort | (Sweden) Felix Rosenqvist | (Sweden) Felix Rosenqvist | (Sweden) Felix Rosenqvist | (Germany) kfzteile24 Mücke Motorsport |
| 9 | R1 | (Italy) Autodromo Vallelunga "Piero Taruffi" | (Italy) Raffaele Marciello | (United Kingdom) Alex Lynn | (Italy) Raffaele Marciello | (Italy) Prema Powerteam |
| 9 | R2 | (Italy) Autodromo Vallelunga "Piero Taruffi" | (United Kingdom) Alex Lynn | (United Kingdom) Alex Lynn | (United Kingdom) Alex Lynn | (Italy) Prema Powerteam |
| 9 | R3 | (Italy) Autodromo Vallelunga "Piero Taruffi" | (Italy) Raffaele Marciello | (United Kingdom) Alexander Sims | (Italy) Raffaele Marciello | (Italy) Prema Powerteam |
| 10 | R1 | (Germany) Hockenheimring | (Italy) Raffaele Marciello | (Sweden) Felix Rosenqvist | (Sweden) Felix Rosenqvist | (Germany) kfzteile24 Mücke Motorsport |
| 10 | R2 | (Germany) Hockenheimring | (Sweden) Felix Rosenqvist | (Sweden) Felix Rosenqvist | (Sweden) Felix Rosenqvist | (Germany) kfzteile24 Mücke Motorsport |
| 10 | R3 | (Germany) Hockenheimring | (Italy) Raffaele Marciello | (Sweden) Felix Rosenqvist | (Italy) Raffaele Marciello | (Italy) Prema Powerteam |

== Championship standings ==
Scoring system

| Position | 1st | 2nd | 3rd | 4th | 5th | 6th | 7th | 8th | 9th | 10th |
| Points | 25 | 18 | 15 | 12 | 10 | 8 | 6 | 4 | 2 | 1 |

=== Drivers' championship ===
The third race at Monza was red-flagged after half the race had been completed due to torrential rain. As a result, series organisers awarded half points to each of the classified finishers eligible to score points.

(key)

| Pos. | Driver | MNZ (Italy) | | | SIL (United Kingdom) | | | HOC (Germany) | | | BRH (United Kingdom) | | | RBR (Austria) | | | NOR (Germany) | | | NÜR (Germany) | | | ZAN (Netherlands) | | | VAL (Italy) | | | HOC (Germany) | | | Points |
| Pos. | Driver | R1 | R2 | R3 | R1 | R2 | R3 | R1 | R2 | R3 | R1 | R2 | R3 | R1 | R2 | R3 | R1 | R2 | R3 | R1 | R2 | R3 | R1 | R2 | R3 | R1 | R2 | R3 | R1 | R2 | R3 | Points |
|---|---|---|---|---|---|---|---|---|---|---|---|---|---|---|---|---|---|---|---|---|---|---|---|---|---|---|---|---|---|---|---|---|
| 1 | (Italy) Raffaele Marciello | 1 | 2 | 1 | 6 | 2 | 1 | 1 | 1 | 4 | 2 | 1 | DSQ | 4 | 13 | 6 | 1 | 3 | 2 | 1 | 1 | 1 | 5 | 16 | Ret | 1 | Ret | 1 | 2 | 4 | 1 | 489.5 |
| 2 | (Sweden) Felix Rosenqvist | Ret | 4 | 11 | 3 | 1 | 2 | 8 | 10 | 1 | 4 | 5 | 3 | 1 | 1 | 1 | 2 | 2 | 1 | 3 | 9 | 5 | 2 | 1 | 1 | 10 | 9 | 6 | 1 | 1 | 2 | 457 |
| 3 | (United Kingdom) Alex Lynn | 8 | 6 | 3 | 2 | 6 | 3 | 15 | 7 | 6 | 1 | 2 | Ret | 7 | 12 | 8 | 3 | 1 | 3 | 14 | 7 | 6 | 3 | 2 | 3 | 3 | 1 | 4 | 4 | 2 | 8 | 339.5 |
| 4 | (Austria) Lucas Auer | 2 | Ret | 4 | 4 | 3 | 7 | 7 | 4 | 12 | 3 | 3 | 1 | 10 | 4 | 3 | 13 | 13 | 6 | 5 | 5 | 2 | 7 | 12 | 7 | 7 | 5 | Ret | 26 | 3 | 3 | 277 |
| 5 | (United Kingdom) Harry Tincknell | 5 | 5 | 6 | 1 | 4 | 9 | 5 | 13 | 25 | 5 | 7 | 2 | 12 | 7 | 4 | 6 | 8 | 8 | 11 | 10 | 4 | 6 | 6 | 6 | 11 | 18 | 8 | 5 | 5 | 5 | 227 |
| 6 | (United Kingdom) Jordan King | 7 | Ret | 9 | 11 | Ret | 6 | 11 | 9 | 5 | 7 | 13 | 11 | 3 | 6 | 5 | 17 | 9 | 9 | 4 | 4 | Ret | 4 | 4 | 2 | 13 | Ret | 5 | 6 | 8 | 9 | 176 |
| 7 | (United Kingdom) Tom Blomqvist | 13 | 3 | 10 | 10 | 5 | 14 | 3 | 3 | 8 | 6 | 6 | 5 | 17 | 8 | Ret | 5 | 7 | 4 | 13 | 12 | 22 | 9 | 8 | 8 | 12 | 12 | 14 | 10 | 12 | 4 | 151.5 |
| 8 | (Brazil) Luis Felipe Derani | 11 | 19 | 5 | 9 | 8 | Ret | 14 | 14 | 10 | 14 | 18 | 17 | 18 | 11 | 9 | 15 | 5 | 7 | 6 | 2 | 3 | 19 | 5 | 5 | 6 | 6 | 2 | 7 | 11 | Ret | 143 |
| 9 | (Germany) Sven Müller | 12 | 9 | 22 | 12 | Ret | Ret | 4 | 8 | 7 | Ret | 4 | 4 | 6 | Ret | Ret | Ret | 17 | 10 | 10 | 6 | Ret | 10 | 7 | 22 | 8 | 8 | Ret | 3 | 6 | 7 | 122 |
| 10 | (United Kingdom) Alexander Sims | | | | | | | | | | | | | | | | 14 | 4 | 5 | 2 | 3 | Ret | Ret | 10 | 9 | 2 | 2 | 3 | | | | 112 |
| 11 | (United States) Félix Serrallés | 6 | 7 | 15 | 8 | DNS | 4 | 2 | 5 | 2 | 16 | 15 | 16 | Ret | 22 | 13 | 4 | 6 | Ret | 8 | 8 | 12 | Ret | Ret | 15 | Ret | Ret | Ret | 11 | DSQ | Ret | 104 |
| 12 | (United Kingdom) Josh Hill | 23 | 8 | 12 | Ret | 7 | Ret | 6 | 2 | 13 | 8 | 8 | 13 | Ret | 5 | 12 | | | | | | | | | | | | | | | | 56 |
| 13 | (Italy) Eddie Cheever III | 10 | 13 | 8 | 19 | 10 | Ret | Ret | 19 | 9 | 17 | 11 | Ret | 8 | 9 | Ret | 11 | 16 | 14 | 16 | 15 | 9 | 13 | Ret | 17 | 5 | 4 | Ret | 9 | 10 | 17 | 50 |
| 14 | (Germany) Pascal Wehrlein | 3 | 1 | 2 | | | | | | | | | | | | | | | | | | | | | | | | | | | | 49 |
| 15 | (Canada) Nicholas Latifi | 16 | 15 | Ret | 5 | Ret | 10 | 23 | 22 | 15 | Ret | 27 | 7 | 5 | Ret | 7 | Ret | 19 | Ret | 19 | 17 | 21 | 8 | 11 | Ret | 17 | 11 | Ret | 12 | 13 | Ret | 45 |
| 16 | (United Kingdom) William Buller | 4 | Ret | 7 | 7 | 9 | 5 | 9 | 11 | 17 | 9 | 9 | 12 | 14 | 16 | 14 | | | | | | | | | | | | | | | | 39 |
| 17 | (Italy) Antonio Giovinazzi | 22† | 12 | 13 | DSQ | DNS | 11 | 12 | Ret | 24 | 11 | 16 | 9 | 15 | 23 | Ret | Ret | 23 | Ret | 18 | 16 | 10 | 14 | Ret | 11 | 9 | 7 | 13 | 17 | 7 | 6 | 31 |
| 18 | (Germany) Lucas Wolf | Ret | 18 | Ret | 17 | 13 | 17 | 18 | 18 | 11 | 12 | 14 | 6 | 16 | 3 | 11 | Ret | 14 | 19 | Ret | Ret | 14 | DNS | 24 | 19 | 19 | Ret | Ret | 19 | 16 | Ret | 28 |
| 19 | (United States) Michael Lewis | | | | 13 | 11 | Ret | 22 | 21 | 16 | DNS | DNS | DNS | 9 | 10 | 15 | 10 | 10 | Ret | 7 | 11 | 7 | Ret | 13 | 13 | 16 | 15 | 10 | 15 | 16 | 10 | 23 |
| 20 | (Netherlands) Dennis van de Laar | 9 | 10 | Ret | 18 | 12 | Ret | 13 | 6 | 14 | Ret | 17 | Ret | 23 | 25 | Ret | Ret | 18 | 13 | 23 | 19 | 15 | 11 | 15 | 23 | 14 | 16 | 9 | 8 | 9 | 12 | 22 |
| 21 | (United Kingdom) Jann Mardenborough | Ret | 11 | 14 | 16 | DNS | 8 | 16 | Ret | 22 | 13 | 10 | Ret | 13 | 21 | Ret | 7 | 27 | 12 | 15 | Ret | 11 | 16 | 23† | 14 | 18 | Ret | 11 | 16 | 18 | 11 | 12 |
| 22 | (Israel) Roy Nissany | Ret | 17 | Ret | 21 | 18 | Ret | 24 | 16 | Ret | 18 | 23 | 8 | 11 | 15 | 10 | 8 | 15 | Ret | 17 | Ret | 18 | 15 | 14 | 12 | 22 | 13 | 17 | 18 | 15 | 15 | 11 |
| 23 | (Australia) Mitchell Gilbert | Ret | Ret | 23† | 15 | 14 | Ret | 17 | 15 | 18 | 20 | 19 | DSQ | 25 | 14 | Ret | Ret | 22 | 17 | 12 | 14 | 8 | 12 | 9 | 10 | 24 | 14 | 12 | 14 | 17 | Ret | 10 |
| 24 | (Germany) André Rudersdorf | 20 | 14 | 24† | 20 | 17 | 16 | 25 | 20 | Ret | 21 | 20 | 10 | 20 | DSQ | 18 | 9 | 20 | 18 | 25 | 22 | 17 | 22 | 21 | 18 | 21 | 19 | 19 | 20 | Ret | 19 | 3 |
| 25 | (Sweden) John Bryant-Meisner | | | | | | | | | | | | | | | | | | | | | | | | | 15 | 10 | 16 | 13 | 14 | Ret | 2 |
| 26 | (Sweden) Måns Grenhagen | Ret | Ret | DNS | 14 | 21† | 12 | 19 | 17 | 19 | 24 | EX | Ret | Ret | 24 | Ret | | | | | | | | | | | | | | | | 0 |
| 27 | (Switzerland) Sandro Zeller | 18 | 21 | NC | NC | 20 | Ret | Ret | 25 | 21 | 19 | 24 | 15 | 19 | 19 | 19 | 12 | 25 | Ret | 24 | 23 | 20 | 20 | 19 | 21 | 23 | 22 | 18 | 23 | 23 | 18 | 0 |
| 28 | (Indonesia) Sean Gelael | 14 | 16 | 17 | 24 | 16 | 18† | 21 | 27 | Ret | 23 | 22 | Ret | 22 | 17 | 20† | Ret | 21 | 15 | 20 | 18 | 13 | 17 | 20 | 20 | Ret | 21 | Ret | 25 | 24 | 13 | 0 |
| 29 | (Japan) Gary Thompson | 24 | 20 | 16 | 25 | Ret | 13 | | | | | | | | | | | | | | | | | | | | | | | | | 0 |
| 30 | (Estonia) Kevin Korjus | | | | | | | | | | | | | | | | | | | | | | | | | | | | Ret | Ret | 14 | 0 |
| 31 | (United Kingdom) Richard Goddard | 15 | 24 | 19 | 23 | 15 | Ret | 27 | 24 | Ret | 15 | 21 | 18 | 24 | 18 | 16 | 19 | 24 | 16 | 21 | 21 | Ret | 18 | 18 | 16 | 25 | 17 | 15 | 22 | 20 | 20 | 0 |
| 32 | (Colombia) Tatiana Calderón | 19 | 23 | 21 | 22 | 19 | 15 | 26 | 26 | 23 | 22 | 25 | 20 | 21 | 20 | 17 | Ret | 26 | Ret | 22 | 20 | 19 | 21 | 22 | 24 | 20 | 20 | 20 | 21 | 22 | Ret | 0 |
| 33 | (Russia) Dmitry Suranovich | 17 | 22 | 18 | | | | | | | | | | | | | | | | | | | | | | | | | | | | 0 |
| 34 | (Mexico) Alfonso Celis Jr. | | | | | | | | | | | | | | | | | | | | | | Ret | 17 | Ret | | | | | | | 0 |
| 35 | (Italy) Michela Cerruti | 21 | Ret | 20 | | | | | | | 25 | 26 | 19 | | | | 18 | 28 | 20 | | | | | | | | | | | | | 0 |
| 36 | (Monaco) Stefano Coletti | | | | | | | | | | | | | | | | | | | | | | | | | | | | Ret | 25 | DNS | 0 |
Guest drivers ineligible for points
| | (Russia) Daniil Kvyat | | | | | | | 10 | 12 | 3 | 10 | 12 | 14 | 2 | 2 | 2 | Ret | 12 | Ret | 9 | 13 | 16 | 1 | 3 | 4 | 4 | 3 | 7 | | | | |
| | (New Zealand) Nick Cassidy | | | | | | | | | | | | | | | | 16 | 11 | 11 | | | | | | | | | | 24 | 21 | 16 | |
| | (United Arab Emirates) Ed Jones | | | | | | | 20 | 23 | 20 | | | | | | | | | | | | | | | | | | | | | | |
| Pos. | Driver | R1 | R2 | R3 | R1 | R2 | R3 | R1 | R2 | R3 | R1 | R2 | R3 | R1 | R2 | R3 | R1 | R2 | R3 | R1 | R2 | R3 | R1 | R2 | R3 | R1 | R2 | R3 | R1 | R2 | R3 | Points |
| Pos. | Driver | MNZ (Italy) | | | SIL (United Kingdom) | | | HOC (Germany) | | | BRH (United Kingdom) | | | RBR (Austria) | | | NOR (Germany) | | | NÜR (Germany) | | | ZAN (Netherlands) | | | VAL (Italy) | | | HOC (Germany) | | | Points |

† — Drivers did not finish the race, but were classified as they completed over 90% of the race distance.

=== Ravenol Team Trophy ===
Prior to each round of the championship, two drivers from each team – if applicable – are nominated to score teams' championship points.

| Pos | Team | Points |
|---|---|---|
| 1 | (Italy) Prema Powerteam | 810 |
| 2 | (Germany) kfzteile24 Mücke Motorsport | 596 |
| 3 | (United Kingdom) Carlin | 498 |
| 4 | (United Kingdom) Fortec Motorsports | 332 |
| 5 | (Italy) EuroInternational | 192 |
| 6 | (United Kingdom) ThreeBond with T-Sport | 192 |
| 7 | (Netherlands) Van Amersfoort Racing | 126 |
| 8 | (Germany) ma-con | 106 |
| 9 | (United Kingdom) Double R Racing | 80.5 |
| 10 | (Germany) URD Rennsport | 44 |
| 11 | (Switzerland) Jo Zeller Racing | 2 |
| 12 | (Italy) Romeo Ferraris | 1 |
