= 2011 Formula Pilota China =

Seasons
- ← none 2012 →

The 2011 Formula Pilota China season is the first season of the newly created Formula Pilota China series, which ran on regulations based on Formula Abarth. The championship began on 3 July at Guangdong and was finished on 27 November at Sepang after twelve races held at six meetings. Also series had non-championship round that held on 3 December at Sepang.

9 teams fielded 26 drivers during the whole tour.

Swiss-French driver, who participated under Czech racing license Mathéo Tuscher became the first Formula Pilota China Champion with 189 points after scoring nine podium finishes from twelve races with eight wins. His nearest competitor, Luis Sá Silva, took two wins during the whole season and managed second overall with 124 points. Third place went to Indonesian driver Dustin Sofyan, who also took Best Asian Driver Trophy.

== Teams and drivers ==
- All cars are FPT-engined Tatuus FA010 chassis.

2011 Entry List
Team	No	Driver	Class	Rounds
(Switzerland) Jenzer Welch Asia Racing	2	(Romania) Robert Visoiu		1–2
(Switzerland) Jenzer Welch Asia Racing	2	(Venezuela) Samin Gómez Briceno		4–6
(Switzerland) Jenzer Welch Asia Racing	18	(Czech Republic) Mathéo Tuscher		All
(Philippines) Eurasia Motorsport	3	(Malaysia) Aaron Chang Mun Shien	AS	5–6
(Philippines) Eurasia Motorsport	5	(China) David Zhu	AS	1–2
(Philippines) Eurasia Motorsport	5	(Australia) Jordan Oon		6
(Philippines) Eurasia Motorsport	73	(Malaysia) Natasha Seatter	AS	4
(Macau) Asia Racing Team	7	(China) Zhang Ran	AS	1–4
(Macau) Asia Racing Team	8	(China) Zhi Cong Li	AS	All
(Macau) Asia Racing Team	9	(Thailand) Tin Sritrai	AS	All
(Macau) Asia Racing Team	2	(Angola) Luís Sá Silva		All
(Macau) Asia Racing Team	26	(Argentina) Eric Lichtenstein		2–3, 5
(Macau) Asia Racing Team	44	(China) Zou Si Rui	AS	6
(Italy) EuroInternational	11	(Austria) Lucas Auer		1
(Italy) EuroInternational	11	(Italy) Lorenzo Camplese		2, 5
(Italy) EuroInternational	29	(Indonesia) Dustin Sofyan	AS	All
(Japan) Super License	13	(Japan) Nobuharu Matsushita	AS	1–3, 5–6
(Japan) Super License	87	(China) Zheng Sun	AS	1–5
(Italy) J.D.Motorsport	24	(Italy) Antonio Spavone		5–6
(Italy) J.D.Motorsport	25	(Italy) Riccardo Agostini		5
(Hong Kong) Audax PS Racing	33	(France) Patrice Bonzom		All
(Hong Kong) Audax PS Racing	36	(China) Yang Xi	AS	5
(Hong Kong) Audax PS Racing	38	(Indonesia) Alexandra Asmasoebrata	AS	All
(Hong Kong) Audax PS Racing	39	(Italy) Stefano Montesi		3
(Hong Kong) Audax PS Racing	48	(Italy) Angelo Negro		1–2, 3–6
(Canada) Atlantic Racing Team	69	(Switzerland) Jimmy Antunes		1–2

Icon	Class
AS	Best Asian Driver Trophy

== Race calendar and results ==
The series' provisional schedule was released on 3 March 2011. Latterly, the calendar was almost totally revised. Rounds in Zhuhai was dropped in favor of Shanghai Tianma, also series had non-championship round at Sepang.

Round		Circuit	Date	Pole position	Fastest lap	Winning driver	Winning team	Asian Trophy
1	R1	(China) Guangdong International Circuit	2 July	(Czech Republic) Mathéo Tuscher	(Czech Republic) Mathéo Tuscher	(Czech Republic) Mathéo Tuscher	(Switzerland) Jenzer Welch Asia Racing	(China) David Zhu
1	R2	(China) Guangdong International Circuit	3 July	(Czech Republic) Mathéo Tuscher	(Austria) Lucas Auer	(Czech Republic) Mathéo Tuscher	(Switzerland) Jenzer Welch Asia Racing	(Indonesia) Dustin Sofyan
2	R1	(China) Shanghai International Circuit	23 July	(Czech Republic) Mathéo Tuscher	(Czech Republic) Mathéo Tuscher	(Angola) Luís Sá Silva	(Macau) Asia Racing Team	(China) David Zhu
2	R2	(China) Shanghai International Circuit	24 July	(Czech Republic) Mathéo Tuscher	(Indonesia) Dustin Sofyan	(Czech Republic) Mathéo Tuscher	(Switzerland) Jenzer Welch Asia Racing	(Indonesia) Dustin Sofyan
3	R1	(China) Shanghai International Circuit	13 August	(Czech Republic) Mathéo Tuscher	(Czech Republic) Mathéo Tuscher	(Czech Republic) Mathéo Tuscher	(Switzerland) Jenzer Welch Asia Racing	(China) Zhi Cong Li
3	R2	(China) Shanghai International Circuit	14 August	(Czech Republic) Mathéo Tuscher	(Czech Republic) Mathéo Tuscher	(Czech Republic) Mathéo Tuscher	(Switzerland) Jenzer Welch Asia Racing	(Indonesia) Dustin Sofyan
4	R1	(China) Ordos International Circuit	3 September	(Czech Republic) Mathéo Tuscher	(Czech Republic) Mathéo Tuscher	(Angola) Luís Sá Silva	(Macau) Asia Racing Team	(Thailand) Tin Sritrai
4	R2	(China) Ordos International Circuit	4 September	(Czech Republic) Mathéo Tuscher	(Czech Republic) Mathéo Tuscher	(Czech Republic) Mathéo Tuscher	(Switzerland) Jenzer Welch Asia Racing	(Thailand) Tin Sritrai
5	R1	(China) Shanghai Tianma Circuit	4 November	(Italy) Lorenzo Camplese	(Czech Republic) Mathéo Tuscher	(Italy) Lorenzo Camplese	(Italy) EuroInternational	(Japan) Nobuharu Matsushita
5	R2	(China) Shanghai Tianma Circuit	5 November	(Czech Republic) Mathéo Tuscher	(Japan) Nobuharu Matsushita	(Czech Republic) Mathéo Tuscher	(Switzerland) Jenzer Welch Asia Racing	(Indonesia) Dustin Sofyan
6	R1	(Malaysia) Sepang International Circuit	26 November	(Japan) Nobuharu Matsushita	(Czech Republic) Mathéo Tuscher	(Czech Republic) Mathéo Tuscher	(Switzerland) Jenzer Welch Asia Racing	(Japan) Nobuharu Matsushita
6	R2	(Malaysia) Sepang International Circuit	27 November	(Czech Republic) Mathéo Tuscher	(Japan) Nobuharu Matsushita	(Japan) Nobuharu Matsushita	(Japan) Super License	(Japan) Nobuharu Matsushita
NC	R1	(Malaysia) Sepang International Circuit	2 December	(Malaysia) Aaron Chang Mun Shien	(Malaysia) Aaron Chang Mun Shien	(Malaysia) Aaron Chang Mun Shien	(Philippines) Eurasia Motorsport	not awarded
NC	R2	(Malaysia) Sepang International Circuit	3 December	(Malaysia) Aaron Chang Mun Shien	(Australia) Jordan Oon	(Australia) Jordan Oon	(Philippines) Eurasia Motorsport	not awarded

== Standings ==
- Points were awarded as follows:

	1	2	3	4	5	6	7	8	9	10	PP
Race 1	20	15	12	10	8	6	4	3	2	1	**1**

Pos	Driver	GUA (China)		SHA (China)		SHA (China)		ORD (China)		SHT (China)		SEP (Malaysia)		SEP‡ (Malaysia)		Pts
1	(Czech Republic) Mathéo Tuscher	**1**	**1**	**Ret**	**1**	**1**	**1**	**6**	**1**	5	**1**	1	**2**			189
2	(Angola) Luís Sá Silva	3	4	1	4	2	7	1	2	9	Ret	6	5			124
3	(Indonesia) Dustin Sofyan	5	3	3	3	4	2	7	4	11	3	4	3			117
4	(Japan) Nobuharu Matsushita	9	11	6	8	6	3			2	4	**2**	1			89
5	(Thailand) Tin Sritrai	7	7	4	10	7	4	2	3	6	Ret	10	11			67
6	(China) Zhi Cong Li	6	8	7	9	3	5	3	6	4	11	9	9			67
7	(Italy) Lorenzo Camplese			13	5					**1**	2					43
8	(China) David Zhu	4	5	2	6											39
9	(Romania) Robert Visoiu	2	6	9	2											38
10	(Venezuela) Samin Gómez Briceno							5	10	8	6	3	6			36
11	(China) Zheng Sun	8	10	5	12			11	7	12	7	Ret	10	4	4	21
12	(Italy) Riccardo Agostini									3	5					20
13	(Malaysia) Natasha Seatter							4	5					5	6	18
14	(Malaysia) Aaron Chang Mun Shien									7	14	7	4	**1**	**2**	18
15	(Austria) Lucas Auer	Ret	2													15
16	(Italy) Antonio Spavone									13	8	5	8			14
17	(Argentina) Eric Lichtenstein			11	11	5	10			10	Ret					10
18	(Switzerland) Jimmy Antunes	10	9	8	7											10
19	(Italy) Stefano Montesi					8	7							7	5	7
20	(Indonesia) Alexandra Asmasoebrata	12	12	14	15	11	Ret	8	9	15	9	11	12			7
21	(Australia) Jordan Oon											8	7	2	1	7
22	(Italy) Angelo Negro	11	13	10	14			9	8	14	13	13	13			6
23	(France) Patrice Bonzom	13	14	12	13	9	8	10	11	16	12	12	14	6	7	6
24	(China) Zhang Ran	14	15	Ret	16	10	9	Ret	12							3
25	(China) Yang Xi									17	10					1
26	(China) Zou Si Rui											14	15			0
	(United States) David Cheng													3	3	0
Pos	Driver	GUA (China)		SHA (China)		SHA (China)		ORD (China)		SHT (China)		SEP (Malaysia)		SEP‡ (Malaysia)		Pts

Colour	Result
Gold	Winner
Silver	Second place
Bronze	Third place
Green	Points classification
Blue	Non-points classification
Blue	Non-classified finish (NC)
Purple	Retired, not classified (Ret)
Red	Did not qualify (DNQ)
Red	Did not pre-qualify (DNPQ)
Black	Disqualified (DSQ)
White	Did not start (DNS)
White	Withdrew (WD)
White	Race cancelled (C)
Blank	Did not practice (DNP)
Blank	Did not arrive (DNA)
Blank	Excluded (EX)

**Bold** – Pole
Italics – Fastest Lap

‡ Round at Sepang was non-championship, no points awarded.
Only eleven best results were count towards the year-end standings.

=== Best Asian Driver Trophy ===
Pos	Driver	GUA (China)		SHA (China)		SHA (China)		ORD (China)		SHT (China)		SEP (Malaysia)		Pts
1	(Indonesia) Dustin Sofyan	5	3	3	3	4	2	7	4	11	3	4	3	188
2	(Japan) Nobuharu Matsushita	9	11	6	8	6	3			2	4	2	1	134
3	(China) Zhi Cong Li	6	8	7	9	3	5	3	6	4	11	9	9	134
4	(Thailand) Tin Sritrai	7	7	4	10	7	4	2	3	6	Ret	10	11	130
5	(China) Zheng Sun	8	10	5	12			11	7	12	7	Ret	10	72
6	(China) David Zhu	4	5	2	6									70
7	(Indonesia) Alexandra Asmasoebrata	12	12	14	15	11	Ret	8	9	15	9	11	12	60
8	(Malaysia) Aaron Chang Mun Shien									7	14	7	4	38
9	(China) Zhang Ran	14	15	Ret	16	10	9	Ret	12					29
10	(Malaysia) Natasha Seatter							4	5					24
11	(China) Yang Xi									17	10			11
12	(China) Zou Si Rui											14	15	7
Pos	Driver	GUA (China)		SHA (China)		SHA (China)		ORD (China)		SHT (China)		SEP (Malaysia)		Pts
