= Hannes van Asseldonk =

Dutch racing driver

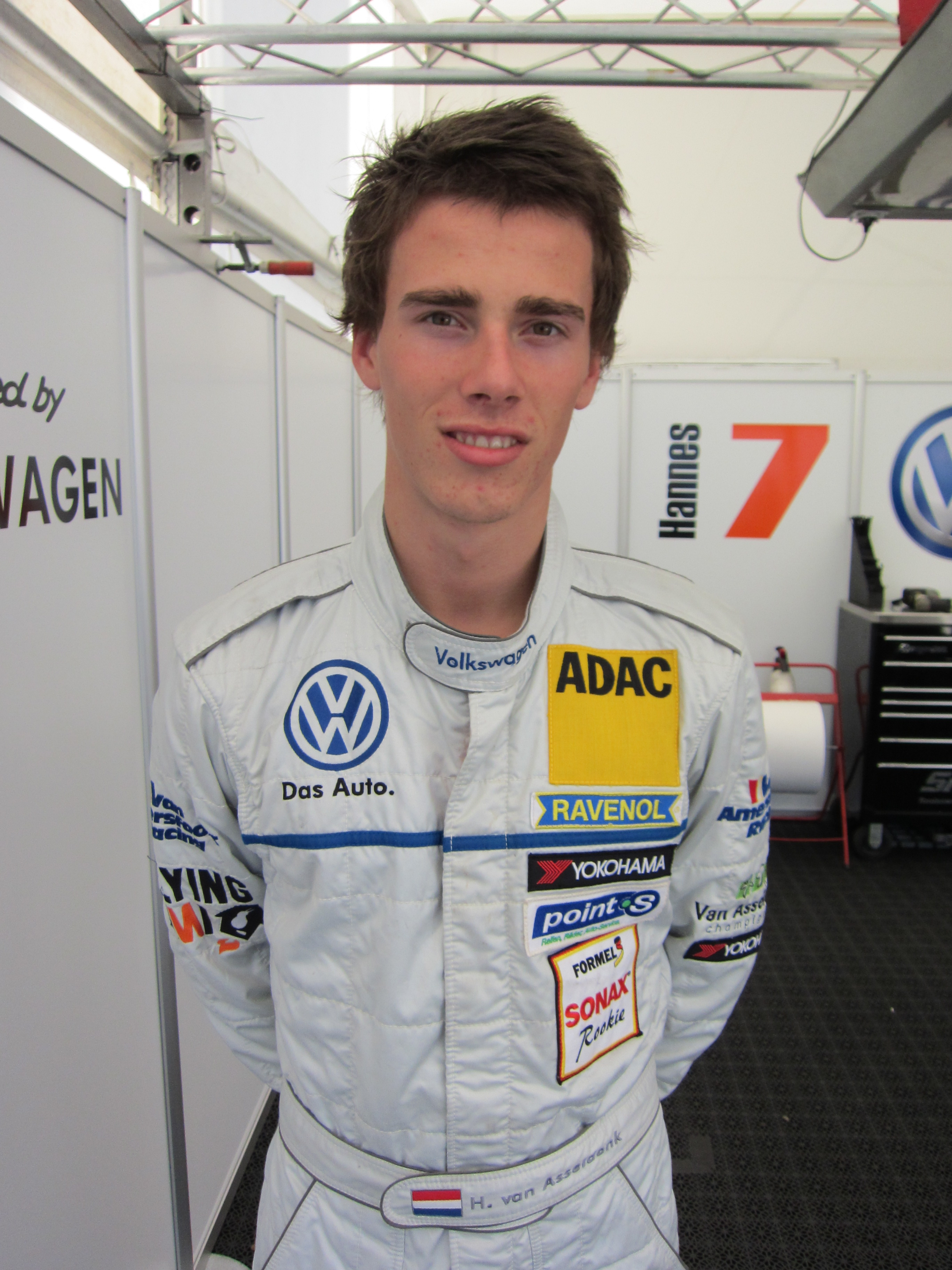
- Van Asseldonk in 2011.
- Nationality: (Netherlands) Dutch
- Born: 10 January 1992 (age 34) Boekel (Netherlands)

British Formula 3 Championship career
- Debut season: 2011
- Current team: Fortec Motorsports
- Car number: 23
- Former teams: Van Amersfoort Racing
- Starts: 8
- Wins: 0
- Poles: 0
- Fastest laps: 2
- Best finish: 9th in 2012

Previous series
- 2012 2011 2011 2011 2010 2010 2010: Toyota Racing Series; FIA Formula 3 International Trophy; German Formula Three Championship; Austria Formel 3 Cup; Formula Abarth; Formula BMW Europe; Formula BMW Pacific

Hannes van Asseldonk (born 10 January 1992) is a Dutch businessman and former racing driver who most recently competed in the Formula 3 Euro Series for Fortec Motorsport.

== Career ==
=== Karting and junior formulae ===
Born in Boekel, Netherlands as the only son of five children to Peter and Dianne van Asseldonk, Hannes van Asseldonk tested a kart for the first time towards the end of the 2006 season, before electing to compete in Junior Rotax Max in 2007. Van Asseldonk finished in fourth place in the Dutch KNAF Championship, while also placing tenth in the Chrono Dutch Rotax Max Challenge. He also finished 38th in the pan-European Rotax Max Challenge. Van Asseldonk remained in Rotax Max karts for 2008, moving up to the senior level of competition, and finished the season as champion of the Benelux Karting Series, finishing seven points clear of closest rival Bastian Hummel. As well as this, van Asseldonk finished third in the Dutch Kart-2-Car Challenge and fourth in the Rotax Max Challenge Grand Finals. Van Asseldonk moved into KZ2 karts with AVG Racing in 2009, with his best result in competition being a fifth place in the Chrono Winter Cup; he also finished inside the final top ten placings of the German Kart Championship, utilising shifter karts. He also contested the CIK-FIA World Cup for KZ1 karts with AVG Racing, but could only finish in 55th position.

Van Asseldonk graduated into single-seaters at the start of the 2010 season, moving into Formula BMW. He made his début at the level in the Pacific series with Motaworld Racing, taking part in the season-opening round at Sepang as a guest driver. This was a precursor to his main campaign in the pan-European championship later in the year, competing for the Josef Kaufmann Racing team alongside Robin Frijns and Petri Suvanto. Van Asseldonk had a tough first half of the season, taking only one top-five finish in four meetings; a fifth-place finish at Zandvoort during the Masters of Formula 3-support event. The first of two late-season podiums came at Hockenheim for van Asseldonk, as he finished in third place behind Frijns and Jack Harvey; the first time that two Dutch drivers had featured on the podium, while it was van Asseldonk's first victory in the Rookie Cup for first-season drivers. He took another third place at the final meeting of the year – and, ultimately the series – at Monza, with Frijns winning the race again ahead of Côme Ledogar. He ultimately finished seventh in the Drivers' Championship, and second to Carlos Sainz Jr. in the Rookie Cup.

Upon the conclusion of the Formula BMW season, van Asseldonk moved into another series; he joined the Prema Junior team in the newly renamed Formula Abarth championship, for the final three races of the 2010 season. He joined the series at Vallelunga, and qualified fourth for his opening race. Van Asseldonk hit form in the series straight away, and ultimately took the first victory of his career, ahead of drivers who had taken part in the full season up to that point; he followed this up with a fifth place in the reverse-grid second race, having failed to advance up the order, after starting in the same position. Van Asseldonk continued his form to the next event at Mugello; he claimed pole position for the weekend's first race by almost 0.3 seconds ahead of closest rival Patric Niederhauser. He repeated his Vallelunga results at the event; he won the opening race after leading from start to finish, and backed that up with a fifth-place finish in the reverse-grid race. He closed the season out with another win, at Monza, en route to finishing sixth in the championship despite only contesting three rounds.

=== Formula Three ===
Van Asseldonk had been scheduled to make his Formula Three race début with Prema Powerteam at the non-championship 2010 Korea Super Prix, but due to a legal technicality with the Korea International Circuit, the circuit hosting the race weekend, the event was cancelled. He moved into the German Formula Three Championship for the 2011 season, signing for three-time series champions Van Amersfoort Racing. He was joined as part of a three-car team by fellow Dutch driver Jeroen Mul and New Zealand's Richie Stanaway.

At the first meeting of the season at Oschersleben, van Asseldonk qualified on pole position for the weekend's second race, but could only finish in the final points-paying position of eighth after a poor getaway. Indeed, it was not until the fifth meeting of the year that van Asseldonk finished on the podium in a race; he finished third in the second race at Zolder, commencing a run of five third places in six races. He achieved another pole position later in the season at Assen, as well as achieving the fastest lap of that particular race. He ultimately finished the season in fifth place in the Drivers' Championship, losing out to fourth-placed Alon Day, by just one point in the standings. Van Asseldonk also contested the Spa round of the British Formula 3 Championship – counting towards the FIA Formula 3 International Trophy standings – with Van Amersfoort, taking a best result of fourth place in the second race, as well as recording the fastest lap. He claimed a win and a second place during a one-off appearance in the Austria Formel 3 Cup at Hockenheim – sharing the victories with Sandro Zeller – and also finished fifth for Hitech Racing on his début at the Macau Grand Prix, finishing as the top rookie driver in the race.

Following on from his Macau performance, van Asseldonk signed to compete in the Toyota Racing Series with Giles Motorsport, for the 2012 championship held in January and February. Van Asseldonk made an immediate impact on the series, taking two victories at the opening meeting at Teretonga. After failing to take a podium at the second meeting at Timaru, van Asseldonk finished in third place in the opening race of the third weekend at Taupo, before winning the final race of the weekend. Although he failed to win another race during the season, he finished four of the remaining six races of the season – at Hampton Downs and Manfeild – on the podium, including three second places, to secure himself second place in the Drivers' Championship, although 176 points in arrears of the champion, team-mate Nick Cassidy. Upon his return from New Zealand, van Asseldonk signed a contract with Fortec Motorsports to contest the British Formula 3 Championship in 2012. He finished ninth in the Drivers' Championship; his best race result was a fourth-place finish at Monza.

== Racing record ==
=== Career summary ===
Season	Series	Team	Races	Wins	Poles	F/Laps	Podiums	Points	Position
2010	Formula BMW Europe	Josef Kaufmann Racing	16	0	0	1	2	174	7th
2010	Formula BMW Pacific	Motaworld Racing	2	0	0	0	0	0	NC^{†}
2010	Formula Abarth	Prema Junior	6	3	1	1	3	76	6th
2011	FIA Formula 3 International Trophy	Van Amersfoort Racing	4	0	0	0	0	0	NC^{†}
2011	FIA Formula 3 International Trophy	Hitech Racing	4	0	0	0	0	0	NC^{†}
2011	German Formula 3 Championship	Van Amersfoort Racing	18	0	2	1	5	61	5th
2011	British Formula 3 International Series	Van Amersfoort Racing	3	0	0	1	0	0	NC^{†}
2011	Austria Formel 3 Cup	Van Amersfoort Racing	2	1	2	2	2	35	10th
2011	Macau Grand Prix	Hitech Racing	1	0	0	0	0	N/A	5th
2012	Toyota Racing Series	Giles Motorsport	15	3	2	3	7	738	2nd
2012	British Formula 3 International Series	Fortec Motorsports	28	0	0	3	1	132	9th

^{†} As van Asseldonk was a guest driver he was ineligible to score points.
