= 2010 Formula BMW Pacific season =

Seasons
- ← 2009 2011 →

The 2010 Formula BMW Pacific season was the seventh and final Formula BMW Pacific season. The championship began on 3 April in Sepang and finished on 21 November in Macau after fifteen races held at six meetings. The series was axed at the end of the season, in favour of a new Formula BMW Talent Cup starting in 2011. Motorsport Asia will continue to run a rebranded JK Racing Asia Series from 2011, without BMW support.

Singapore-licensed, British driver Richard Bradley won the championship for Eurasia Motorsport with two races in hand, after dominating for most of the season, winning seven races outright as well as an eighth by being the top finisher behind the guest drivers – Carlos Sainz Jr. and Daniil Kvyat took five overall victories between them but were ineligible for championship points – run by the EuroInternational team. He also took three other podium finishes en route to a 76-point championship-winning margin over his nearest rival, Meritus driver Óscar Andrés Tunjo. Tunjo finished the season runner-up despite failing to finish any of the final two races, but E-Rain Racing's Jordan Oon or Mofaz Racing's Calvin Wong could not capitalise on Tunjo's misfortune.

Tunjo, Oon and Wong all took overall victories in Singapore, Guangdong and Okayama respectively, but Tunjo's consistent finishing kept him ahead of Oon and Wong, who each added a class win to their overall wins. Bradley's team-mate Nabil Jeffri completed the top five in the championship, and their results along with Kotaro Sakurai and Duvashen Padayachee helped Eurasia claim the Teams' Championship. Other class victories were claimed by EuroInternational's Dustin Sofyan and James Birch of Motaworld Racing.

== Teams and drivers ==
- All cars were BMW-engined Mygale FB02 chassis. Guest drivers in italics.

Team	No	Driver	Class	Rounds
(Malaysia) Motaworld Racing	2	(United Kingdom) James Birch	R	1–2, 4
(Malaysia) Motaworld Racing	3	(Zimbabwe) Axcil Jefferies		1–2
(Malaysia) Motaworld Racing	4	(Australia) Dylan Young	R	1, 4
(Malaysia) Motaworld Racing	6	(Netherlands) Hannes van Asseldonk	R	1
(Malaysia) Motaworld Racing	15	(United Kingdom) Sazlan Sirajudin		2
(Canada) Atlantic Racing Team	2	(United Kingdom) James Birch	R	3, 5
(Canada) Atlantic Racing Team	10	(Australia) Jesse Dixon	R	All
(Canada) Atlantic Racing Team	20	(Switzerland) Yannick Mettler		2
(Canada) Atlantic Racing Team	23	(Switzerland) Jimmy Antunes		5–6
(Canada) Atlantic Racing Team	27	(Hong Kong) William Cheung		6
(Macau) Asia Racing Team	5	(Singapore) Suriya Balakerisnan		1–2
(Macau) Asia Racing Team	21	(Japan) Ryō Hirakawa		5–6
(Macau) Asia Racing Team	22	(Japan) Yuichi Nakayama		5–6
(Macau) Asia Racing Team	25	(China) Li Zhi Cong		6
(Macau) Asia Racing Team	26	(Hong Kong) Paul Lau		4
(Philippines) Eurasia Motorsport	7	(Malaysia) Nabil Jeffri	R	All
(Philippines) Eurasia Motorsport	45	(Australia) Duvashen Padayachee	R	All
(Philippines) Eurasia Motorsport	55	(Philippines) Kotaro Sakurai	R	All
(Philippines) Eurasia Motorsport	69	(Singapore) Richard Bradley	R	All
(Malaysia) Meritus	8	(Indonesia) Dustin Sofyan		1–2
(Malaysia) Meritus	8	(Russia) Andrey Khrapov		4, 6
(Malaysia) Meritus	38	(Thailand) Pasin Lathouras	R	All
(Malaysia) Meritus	78	(Malaysia) Afiq Ikhwan	R	1–5
(Malaysia) Meritus	88	(Colombia) Óscar Andrés Tunjo	R	All
(South Korea) E-Rain Racing	9	(South Korea) Tom Mun		All
(South Korea) E-Rain Racing	66	(Australia) Jordan Oon	R	All
(South Korea) E-Rain Racing	77	(Malaysia) Fahmi Ilyas	R	1
(United States) EuroInternational	11	(Russia) Daniil Kvyat	R	1–2, 4
(United States) EuroInternational	11	(United Kingdom) Tom Blomqvist	R	6
(United States) EuroInternational	12	(Spain) Carlos Sainz Jr.	R	1–2, 4, 6
(United States) EuroInternational	14	(United States) Michael Lewis	R	1–2
(United States) EuroInternational	14	(Indonesia) Dustin Sofyan		4–6
(United States) EuroInternational	15	(Japan) Tomoki Nojiri	R	6
(Malaysia) Petronas Mofaz Racing	16	(Malaysia) Calvin Wong		All
(Malaysia) Petronas Mofaz Racing	17	(Malaysia) Ryan Ritchie	R	All
(Malaysia) Petronas Mofaz Racing	18	(Malaysia) Natasha Seatter	R	All
(Malaysia) Petronas Mofaz Racing	19	(Malaysia) Amirrul Khirudin	R	All
(Hong Kong) Champ Motorsport	68	(Macau) Ivo Yiu		6
(Hong Kong) Champ Motorsport	73	(Macau) Wai Kai Un		6
(Hong Kong) Champ Motorsport	83	(Hong Kong) Jim Ka To		6
(Malaysia) Mango Asia	75	(Malaysia) Chang Mun Shien	R	1
(Malaysia) IM Racing	75	(Malaysia) Chang Mun Shien	R	2–6

Icon	Class
R	Rookie Driver

== Race calendar and results ==
- Three rounds were confirmed via an announcement by the FIA on 18 December 2009. A provisional calendar was latterly released by the championship, before being confirmed with no further changes. Latterly, rounds scheduled for the Korea International Circuit were moved to Guangdong and Okayama due to delays in track construction.

Round		Circuit	Date	Pole position	Fastest lap	Winning driver	Winning team	Supporting
1	R1	(Malaysia) Sepang International Circuit	3 April	(Singapore) Richard Bradley	(Singapore) Richard Bradley	(Singapore) Richard Bradley	(Philippines) Eurasia Motorsport	Malaysian Grand Prix
1	R2	(Malaysia) Sepang International Circuit	4 April	(Singapore) Richard Bradley	(Singapore) Richard Bradley	(Singapore) Richard Bradley	(Philippines) Eurasia Motorsport	Malaysian Grand Prix
2	R1	(Malaysia) Sepang International Circuit	15 May	(Philippines) Kotaro Sakurai^{1}	(United States) Michael Lewis	(Russia) Daniil Kvyat	(United States) EuroInternational	Asian Festival of Speed
2	R2	(Malaysia) Sepang International Circuit	15 May	(Philippines) Kotaro Sakurai^{2}	(United States) Michael Lewis	(Spain) Carlos Sainz Jr.	(United States) EuroInternational	Asian Festival of Speed
2	R3	(Malaysia) Sepang International Circuit	16 May		(Colombia) Óscar Andrés Tunjo	(Russia) Daniil Kvyat	(United States) EuroInternational	Asian Festival of Speed
2	R4	(Malaysia) Sepang International Circuit	16 May		(Colombia) Óscar Andrés Tunjo	(Spain) Carlos Sainz Jr.	(United States) EuroInternational	Asian Festival of Speed
3	R1	(China) Guangdong International Circuit	4 September	(Australia) Jordan Oon	(Malaysia) Calvin Wong	(Singapore) Richard Bradley	(Philippines) Eurasia Motorsport	Hong Kong Touring Car Championship
3	R2	(China) Guangdong International Circuit	4 September	(Australia) Jordan Oon	(Singapore) Richard Bradley	(Singapore) Richard Bradley	(Philippines) Eurasia Motorsport	Hong Kong Touring Car Championship
3	R3	(China) Guangdong International Circuit	5 September		(Australia) Jordan Oon	(Australia) Jordan Oon	(South Korea) E-Rain Racing	Hong Kong Touring Car Championship
3	R4	(China) Guangdong International Circuit	5 September		(Colombia) Óscar Andrés Tunjo	(Singapore) Richard Bradley	(Philippines) Eurasia Motorsport	Hong Kong Touring Car Championship
4	R1	(Singapore) Marina Bay Street Circuit	25 September	(Singapore) Richard Bradley^{1}	(Spain) Carlos Sainz Jr.	(Singapore) Richard Bradley	(Philippines) Eurasia Motorsport	Singapore Grand Prix
4	R2	(Singapore) Marina Bay Street Circuit	26 September	(Colombia) Óscar Andrés Tunjo	(Spain) Carlos Sainz Jr.	(Colombia) Óscar Andrés Tunjo	(Malaysia) Meritus	Singapore Grand Prix
5	R1	(Japan) Okayama International Circuit	30 October	(Colombia) Óscar Andrés Tunjo	(Malaysia) Calvin Wong	(Singapore) Richard Bradley	(Philippines) Eurasia Motorsport	WTCC Race of Japan
5	R2	(Japan) Okayama International Circuit	31 October	(Indonesia) Dustin Sofyan	(Japan) Yuichi Nakayama	(Malaysia) Calvin Wong	(Malaysia) Petronas Mofaz Racing	WTCC Race of Japan
6		Guia Circuit, Macau	21 November	(Colombia) Óscar Andrés Tunjo^{2}	(United Kingdom) Tom Blomqvist	(Spain) Carlos Sainz Jr.	(United States) EuroInternational	Macau Grand Prix

- ^{1} Pole position recorded by Daniil Kvyat, but he was ineligible to score the pole point.
- ^{2} Pole position recorded by Carlos Sainz Jr., but he was ineligible to score the pole point.

== Standings ==
=== Drivers' Championship ===
- Points were awarded as follows:

	1	2	3	4	5	6	7	8	9	10	PP
Race 1	20	15	12	10	8	6	4	3	2	1	**1**

Pos	Driver	SEP (Malaysia)		SEP (Malaysia)				GUA (China)				SIN (Singapore)		OKA (Japan)		MAC (Macau)	Pts
1	(Singapore) Richard Bradley	**1**	**1**	Ret	8	4	4	1	1	Ret	1	**1**	3	1	2	17	217
2	(Colombia) Óscar Andrés Tunjo	4	2	Ret	Ret	6	6	4	7	2	2	5	**1**	**3**	Ret	**Ret**	141
3	(Australia) Jordan Oon	10	10	Ret	4	13	5	**2**	**2**	1	5	8	13	9	8	6	134
4	(Malaysia) Calvin Wong	15	8	4	17	3	16	7	Ret	4	3	3	12	2	1	Ret	121
5	(Malaysia) Nabil Jeffri	9	Ret	7	5	8	11	5	4	7	Ret	15	4	8	16	10	83
6	(Malaysia) Afiq Ikhwan	8	Ret	Ret	Ret	15	12	6	3	Ret	6	4	6	4	6		74
7	(Indonesia) Dustin Sofyan	6	12	5	6	18	Ret					Ret	Ret	5	**Ret**	4	68
8	(Philippines) Kotaro Sakurai	Ret	3	**NC**	**DSQ**	5	8	10	Ret	13	8	Ret	8	DSQ	5	5	68
9	(United Kingdom) James Birch	12	Ret	3	7	11	Ret	9	6	9	11	7	5	16	Ret		63
10	(South Korea) Tom Mun	Ret	15	Ret	13	12	9	Ret	5	3	4	10	10	7	13	Ret	49
11	(Australia) Duvashen Padayachee	20	11	13	10	10	10	3	Ret	6	9	Ret	14	10	10	9	49
12	(Australia) Jesse Dixon	13	13	8	9	Ret	7	Ret	8	Ret	Ret	14	7	6	9	12	49
13	(Thailand) Pasin Lathouras	14	14	6	14	9	13	8	9	5	7	9	9	12	DSQ	11	46
14	(Malaysia) Chang Mun Shien	11	19	10	12	Ret	Ret	13	Ret	8	12	13	11	Ret	15	8	23
15	(Zimbabwe) Axcil Jefferies	7	9	DNQ	DNQ	DNQ	DNQ										18
16	(Malaysia) Amirrul Khirudin	18	20	DNS	18	19	18	12	Ret	12	10	12	16	17	12	22	5
17	(Singapore) Suriya Balakerisnan	Ret	16	11	11	17	15										5
18	(Malaysia) Ryan Ritchie	17	21	Ret	16	16	14	11	Ret	11	13	18	15	13	11	14	5
19	(Switzerland) Yannick Mettler			9	Ret	14	Ret										4
20	(Malaysia) Natasha Seatter	Ret	22	12	Ret	21	EX	14	Ret	10	14	16	18	15	14	16	3
21	(Australia) Dylan Young	16	17									17	Ret				0
guest drivers ineligible for points
	(Spain) Carlos Sainz Jr.	2	4	Ret	**1**	7	1					6	2			**1**	0
	(Russia) Daniil Kvyat	19	5	**1**	2	1	3					**2**	Ret				0
	(United States) Michael Lewis	5	6	2	3	2	2										0
	(Japan) Tomoki Nojiri															2	0
	(Malaysia) Fahmi Ilyas	3	7														0
	(Japan) Yuichi Nakayama													DSQ	3	20	0
	(United Kingdom) Tom Blomqvist															3	0
	(Japan) Ryō Hirakawa													11	4	Ret	0
	(Switzerland) Jimmy Antunes													14	7	13	0
	(Hong Kong) Jim Ka To															7	0
	(Russia) Andrey Khrapov											11	17			Ret	0
	(United Kingdom) Sazlan Sirajudin			14	15	20	17										0
	(China) Li Zhi Cong															15	0
	(Hong Kong) Paul Lau											18	19				0
	(Netherlands) Hannes van Asseldonk	Ret	18														0
	(Hong Kong) William Cheung															18	0
	(Macau) Ivo Yiu															19	0
	(Macau) Wai Kai Un															21	0
Pos	Driver	SEP (Malaysia)		SEP (Malaysia)				GUA (China)				SIN (Singapore)		OKA (Japan)		MAC (Macau)	Pts

Colour	Result
Gold	Winner
Silver	Second place
Bronze	Third place
Green	Points classification
Blue	Non-points classification
Blue	Non-classified finish (NC)
Purple	Retired, not classified (Ret)
Red	Did not qualify (DNQ)
Red	Did not pre-qualify (DNPQ)
Black	Disqualified (DSQ)
White	Did not start (DNS)
White	Withdrew (WD)
White	Race cancelled (C)
Blank	Did not practice (DNP)
Blank	Did not arrive (DNA)
Blank	Excluded (EX)

**Bold** – Pole
Italics – Fastest Lap

=== Teams' Championship ===
- Points were awarded on the same basis (excluding pole points) as the drivers' championship, but only to a team's first two cars at the end of the race. If a team was running just one car at a meeting, their points were doubled.

Pos	Team	SEP (Malaysia)		SEP (Malaysia)				GUA (China)				SIN (Singapore)		OKA (Japan)		MAC (Macau)	Pts
1	(Philippines) Eurasia Motorsport	1	1	7	5	4	4	1	1	6	1	1	3	1	2	5	362
1	(Philippines) Eurasia Motorsport	9	3	13	8	5	8	3	4	7	8	15	4	8	5	9	362
2	(Malaysia) Meritus	4	2	5	6	6	6	4	3	2	2	4	1	3	6	11	281
2	(Malaysia) Meritus	6	12	6	14	9	12	6	7	5	6	5	6	4	Ret	Ret	281
3	(South Korea) E-Rain Racing	3	10	Ret	4	12	5	2	2	1	4	8	10	7	8	6	196
3	(South Korea) E-Rain Racing	10	15	Ret	13	13	9	Ret	5	3	5	10	13	9	13	Ret	196
4	(Malaysia) Petronas Mofaz Racing	15	8	4	16	3	14	7	Ret	4	3	3	12	2	1	14	152
4	(Malaysia) Petronas Mofaz Racing	17	20	12	17	16	16	11	Ret	10	10	12	15	13	11	16	152
5	(Canada) Atlantic Racing Team	13	13	8	9	14	7	9	6	9	11	14	7	6	7	12	85
5	(Canada) Atlantic Racing Team			9	Ret	Ret	Ret	Ret	8	Ret	Ret			14	9	13	85
6	(Malaysia) Motaworld Racing	7	9	3	7	11	17					7	5				75
6	(Malaysia) Motaworld Racing	12	17	14	15	20	Ret					17	Ret				75
7	(Malaysia) IM Racing			10	12	Ret	Ret	13	Ret	8	12	13	11	Ret	15	8	58
8	(United States) EuroInternational	2	4	1	1	1	1					2	2	5	Ret	1	56
8	(United States) EuroInternational	5	5	2	2	2	2					6	Ret			4	56
9	(Macau) Asia Racing Team	Ret	16	11	11	17	15					19	19	11	3	15	18
9	(Macau) Asia Racing Team													DSQ	4	20	18
10	(Malaysia) Mango Asia	11	19														8
Guest teams ineligible for points
	(Hong Kong) Champ Motorsport															7	0
	(Hong Kong) Champ Motorsport															19	0
Pos	Team	SEP (Malaysia)		SEP (Malaysia)				GUA (China)				SIN (Singapore)		OKA (Japan)		MAC (Macau)	Pts

Colour	Result
Gold	Winner
Silver	Second place
Bronze	Third place
Green	Points classification
Blue	Non-points classification
Blue	Non-classified finish (NC)
Purple	Retired, not classified (Ret)
Red	Did not qualify (DNQ)
Red	Did not pre-qualify (DNPQ)
Black	Disqualified (DSQ)
White	Did not start (DNS)
White	Withdrew (WD)
White	Race cancelled (C)
Blank	Did not practice (DNP)
Blank	Did not arrive (DNA)
Blank	Excluded (EX)
