= Antonio Spavone =

Italian racing driver and Entrepreneur (born 1994)

- Nationality: (Italy) Italian
- Born: 2 June 1994 (age 32) Naples (Italy)

Previous series
- 2012-13 2012 2010–11: Auto GP; GP3 Series; Formula Abarth

Antonio Spavone (born 2 June 1994) is an Italian former racing driver and entrepreneur.

== Career ==
=== Karting ===
Spavone was born in Naples. He began karting in 2005 and raced primarily in his native Italy for the majority of this part of career, working his way up from the junior ranks to progress through to the KF2 category by 2010.

=== Formula Abarth ===
In 2010, Spavone graduated to single–seaters into the newly launched Formula Abarth series in Italy, stating with Alan Racing, debuting at Vallelunga with three rounds to spare. His best result was a finish in fourteenth place at Mugello that brought him 31st place in the series standings. Spavone stayed in Formula Abarth for a second season in 2011 but switched to debutants JD Motorsport, when the series split in European and Italian series. He had six-pointscoring finishes in Italian and four in European Series and finally finished thirteenth and fourteenth respectively.

=== Auto GP World Series ===
In 2012, Spavone joined Euronova Racing for his debut in Auto GP World Series.

=== GP3 Series ===
As well as Auto GP, Spavone would also race for Trident Racing in GP3 Series.

== Racing record ==
=== Career summary ===
| Season | Series | Team | Races | Wins | Poles | F/Laps | Podiums | Points | Position |
|---|---|---|---|---|---|---|---|---|---|
| 2010 | Formula Abarth | Alan Racing | 6 | 0 | 0 | 0 | 0 | 0 | 34th |
| 2011 | Formula Abarth Italian Series | JD Motorsport | 14 | 0 | 0 | 0 | 0 | 12 | 13th |
| 2011 | Formula Abarth European Series | JD Motorsport | 12 | 0 | 0 | 0 | 0 | 18 | 14th |
| 2011 | Formula Pilota China | JD Motorsport | 4 | 0 | 0 | 0 | 0 | 14 | 16th |
| 2012 | Auto GP World Series | Euronova Racing | 12 | 0 | 0 | 0 | 0 | 41 | 10th |
| 2012 | Auto GP World Series | Ombra Racing | 12 | 0 | 0 | 0 | 0 | 41 | 10th |
| 2012 | GP3 Series | Trident Racing | 8 | 0 | 0 | 0 | 0 | 0 | 30th |

=== Complete Auto GP results ===
(key) (Races in bold indicate pole position) (Races in italics indicate fastest lap)

| Year | Entrant | 1 | 2 | 3 | 4 | 5 | 6 | 7 | 8 | 9 | 10 | 11 | 12 | 13 | 14 | 15 | 16 | Pos | Points |
|---|---|---|---|---|---|---|---|---|---|---|---|---|---|---|---|---|---|---|---|
| 2012 | Euronova Racing | MNZ; 1; 8 | MNZ; 2; 5 | VAL; 1; 9 | VAL; 2; 11 | MAR; 1; 8 | MAR; 2 Ret | HUN; 1; 8 | HUN; 2; 8 | ALG; 1; 11 | ALG; 2; 9 | CUR; 1 | CUR; 2 | | | | | 10th | 41 |
| 2012 | Ombra Racing | | | | | | | | | | | | | SON; 1; 8 | SON; 2; 4 | | | 10th | 41 |
| 2013 | Super Nova International | MNZ; 1; 6 | MNZ; 2; 9 | MAR; 1; 5 | MAR; 2; 9† | HUN; 1 | HUN; 2 | SIL; 1 | SIL; 2 | MUG; 1 | MUG; 2 | NÜR; 1 | NÜR; 2 | DON; 1 | DON; 2 | BRN; 1 | BRN; 2 | 14th | 22 |

=== Complete GP3 Series results ===
(key) (Races in bold indicate pole position) (Races in italics indicate fastest lap)

| Year | Entrant | 1 | 2 | 3 | 4 | 5 | 6 | 7 | 8 | 9 | 10 | 11 | 12 | 13 | 14 | 15 | 16 | D.C. | Points |
|---|---|---|---|---|---|---|---|---|---|---|---|---|---|---|---|---|---|---|---|
| 2012 | Trident Racing | CAT; FEA; 17 | CAT; SPR; Ret | MON; FEA; 20 | MON; SPR; 14 | VAL; FEA; Ret | VAL; SPR; 17 | SIL; FEA; 21 | SIL; SPR; 18 | HOC; FEA | HOC; SPR | HUN; FEA | HUN; SPR | SPA; FEA | SPA; SPR | MNZ; FEA | MNZ; SPR | 30th | 0 |
