= 2013 Porsche Carrera Cup Asia =

Motorsport racing season

The 2013 Porsche Carrera Cup Asia was the eleventh season of the Porsche Carrera Cup Asia. The season commenced on March 22 at the Sepang International Circuit and finished at the Shanghai International Circuit on October 27. There was also an additional non-championship invitational race held on the Guia Circuit two weeks after the conclusion of the championship.

Earl Bamber secured the drivers championship in the final round in Shanghai after a season-long battle with series rival, Martin Ragginger. Egidio Perfetti secured the B-Class championship in the penultimate round in Singapore.

== Calendar ==
The following venues hosted at least one round of the 2013 championship.

| Round | Circuit | Date | Supporting |
|---|---|---|---|
| 1 | Sepang International Circuit, Selangor, Malaysia | 22–24 March | Malaysian Grand Prix; GP2 Series |
| 2 | Shanghai International Circuit, Shanghai, China | 12–14 April | Chinese Grand Prix |
| 3 | Zhuhai International Circuit, Zhuhai, China | 4–5 May | Audi R8 LMS Cup |
| 4 | Ordos International Circuit, Ordos City, China | 6–7 July | China Touring Car Championship; Audi R8 LMS Cup; Formula Masters China |
| 5 | Inje Speedium, Inje County, South Korea | 3–4 August | Audi R8 LMS Cup; Ferrari Challenge Asia-Pacific; Asian Le Mans Series |
| 6 | Marina Bay Street Circuit, Marina Bay, Singapore | 20–22 September | Singapore Grand Prix; GP2 Series |
| 7 | Shanghai International Circuit, Shanghai, China | 25–27 October | Lamborghini Super Trofeo Asia; Audi R8 LMS Cup; Formula Masters China |
| NC | Guia Circuit, Macau | 9–10 November | Lamborghini Super Trofeo Asia; Audi R8 LMS Cup; Formula Masters China |

== Teams and drivers ==
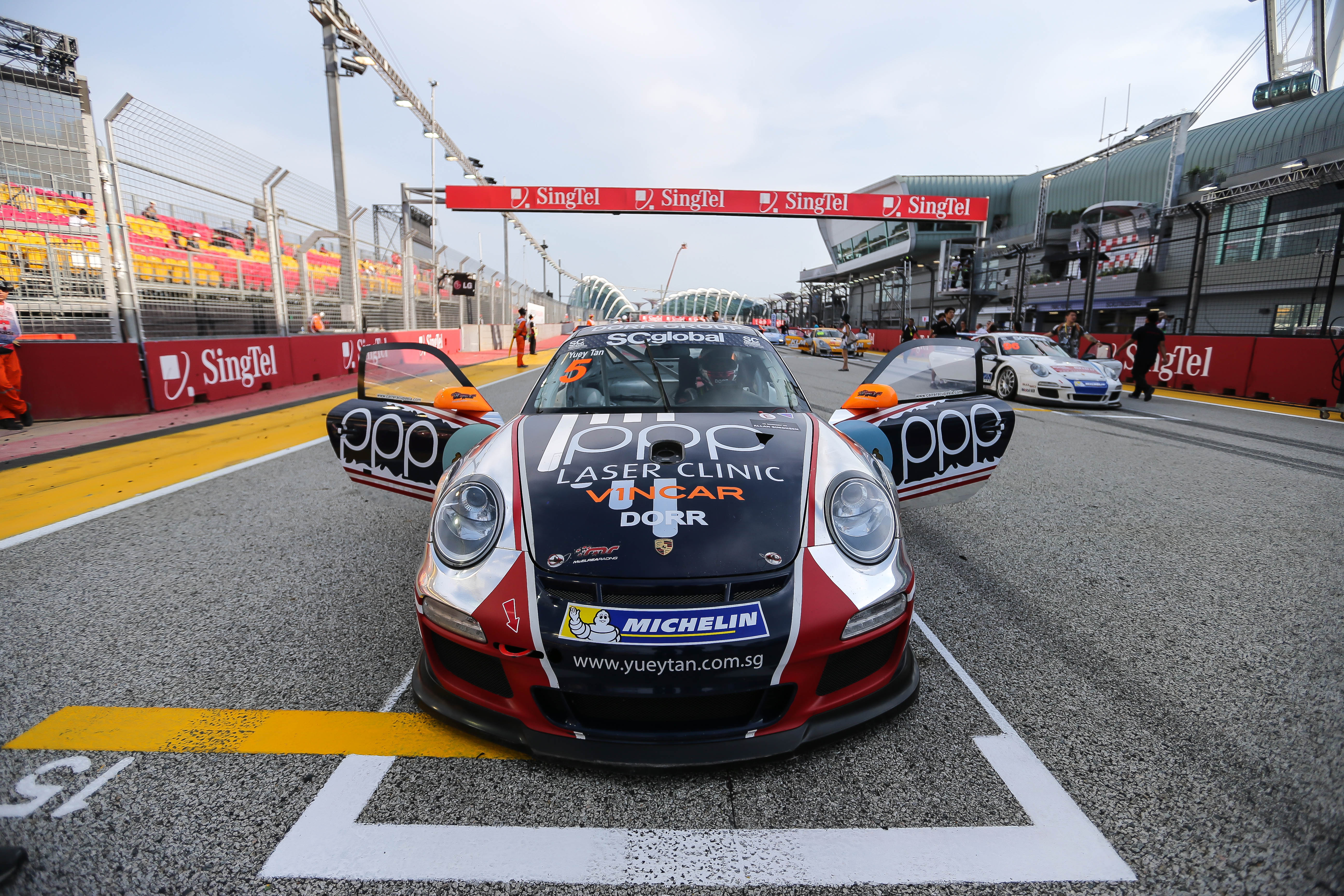
Yuey Tan on the grid in the Singapore round.

All entrants utilized the Porsche 997.2 GT3 Cup cars.

| Team | No. | Driver | Class | Rounds |
|---|---|---|---|---|
| (China) Team Carrera Cup Asia | 3 | (Malaysia) Fairuz Fauzy | | 1 |
| (China) Team Carrera Cup Asia | 3 | (Hong Kong) Darryl O'Young | | 2, 7 |
| (China) Team Carrera Cup Asia | 3 | (Hong Kong) Daniel Andrew Bilski | B | 3 |
| (China) Team Carrera Cup Asia | 3 | (South Korea) Récardo Bruins Choi | | 5 |
| (China) Team Carrera Cup Asia | 3 | (New Zealand) Craig Baird | | 6 |
| (China) Team Carrera Cup Asia | 3 | (France) Sébastien Loeb | | NC |
| (New Zealand) McElrea Racing | 5 | (Singapore) Yuey Tan | B | All |
| (Malaysia) Nexus Racing | 7 | (New Zealand) Earl Bamber | | All |
| (Malaysia) Nexus Racing | 27 | (Malaysia) Adrian Henry D'Silva | | All |
| (Malaysia) Nexus Racing | 72 | (Malaysia) Alif Hamdan | | All |
| (Malaysia) Nexus Racing | 77 | (Hong Kong) Daniel Andrew Bilski | B | NC |
| (China) Team Yongda Dongfang | 8 | (France) Benjamin Rouget | | All |
| (China) Team Betterlife | 9 | (China) Wang Jian Wei | | 1–4 |
| (China) Team Betterlife | 9 | (Hong Kong) Jacky Yeung | B | 5 |
| (China) Team Betterlife | 9 | (Germany) Mario Farnbacher | | 6 |
| (China) Team Betterlife | 9 | (United Kingdom) Ben Barker | | 7 |
| (China) Asia Racing Team | 9 | (Macau) Kevin Tse | B | NC |
| (China) Asia Racing Team | 96 | (China) Li Chao | B | All |
| (Singapore) Team Kangshun | 11 | (Singapore) Ringo Chong | | All |
| (Japan) Bright Motorsport | 12 | (Japan) Ryo Ogawa | | NC |
| (Japan) Garmin Porsche | 14 | (Japan) Hideto Yasuoka | | NC |
| (Hong Kong) Modena Motorsports | 16 | (Hong Kong) Wayne Shen | | All |
| (Hong Kong) Modena Motorsports | 28 | (Hong Kong) John Shen | B | All |
| (Hong Kong) OpenRoad Racing | 18 | (Netherlands) Marcel Tjia | B | 1, 3–4, 6–7 |
| (Hong Kong) OpenRoad Racing | 21 | (Netherlands) Francis Tjia | B | 1, 3–7 |
| (Hong Kong) OpenRoad Racing | 21 | (Hong Kong) Benny Lim | B | 2 |
| (Hong Kong) OpenRoad Racing | 25 | (Canada) Christian Chia | | 2, 5 |
| (Japan) Ninne Racing | 19 | (Japan) Hiroaki Nagai | | NC |
| (Hong Kong) Team Jebsen | 20 | (Macau) Rodolfo Ávila | | All |
| (Hong Kong) LKM Racing Team | 22 | (Hong Kong) Adderly Fong | | 4 |
| (Hong Kong) LKM Racing Team | 22 | (Hong Kong) Alan Siu | B | 3, 5–7 |
| (Hong Kong) LKM Racing Team | 22 | (New Zealand) Earl Bamber | | NC |
| (Hong Kong) LKM Racing Team | 38 | (Japan) Keita Sawa | | All |
| (Hong Kong) Samson Chan | 33 | (Hong Kong) Samson Chan | B | 1–3, 5–7 |
| (Chinese Taipei) George Chou | 33 | (Chinese Taipei) George Chou | B | 4 |
| (Hong Kong) Kamlung Racing | 58 | (China) Ho-Pin Tung | | All |
| (Hong Kong) Kamlung Racing | 68 | (China) Li Zhicong | | All |
| (China) Team C&D | 66 | (China) Zhi Qiang Zhang | | All |
| (China) Team Basetex | 78 | (China) Zhang Dasheng | | All |
| (Hong Kong) Ma Chi Min | 83 | (Hong Kong) Ma Chi Min | B | All |
| (China) Team Eagle - Jiejun & Junbaojie | 86 | (Austria) Martin Ragginger | | All |
| (Japan) Improve Racing | 87 | (Japan) Tsubasa Kondo | | NC |
| (Hong Kong) Seminole Racing Team | 88 | (Norway) Egidio Perfetti | B | All |
| (Singapore) Team StarChase | 99 | (Switzerland) Alexandre Imperatori | | 1, 3–7 |
| (Singapore) Team StarChase | 99 | (Malaysia) Natasha Seatter | | 2 |

| Icon | Class |
|---|---|
| B | B Class |
| | Guest Starter |

== Results ==
| Round | | Circuit | Pole Position | Overall Winner | B-Class Pole Position | B-Class Winner |
|---|---|---|---|---|---|---|
| 1 | | (Malaysia) Sepang | (Austria) Martin Ragginger | (Austria) Martin Ragginger | (Norway) Egidio Perfetti | (Norway) Egidio Perfetti |
| 2 | R1 | (China) Shanghai 1 | (Austria) Martin Ragginger | (Austria) Martin Ragginger | (Norway) Egidio Perfetti | (Norway) Egidio Perfetti |
| 2 | R2 | (China) Shanghai 1 | | (Austria) Martin Ragginger | | (Norway) Egidio Perfetti |
| 3 | R1 | (China) Zhuhai | (Austria) Martin Ragginger | (New Zealand) Earl Bamber | (Netherlands) Francis Tjia | (Netherlands) Francis Tjia |
| 3 | R2 | (China) Zhuhai | | (New Zealand) Earl Bamber | | (Norway) Egidio Perfetti |
| 4 | R1 | (China) Ordos | (New Zealand) Earl Bamber | (New Zealand) Earl Bamber | (Norway) Egidio Perfetti | (Norway) Egidio Perfetti |
| 4 | R2 | (China) Ordos | | (New Zealand) Earl Bamber | | (Norway) Egidio Perfetti |
| 5 | R1 | (South Korea) Inje | (Austria) Martin Ragginger | (China) Ho-Pin Tung | (Norway) Egidio Perfetti | (Norway) Egidio Perfetti |
| 5 | R2 | (South Korea) Inje | | (Austria) Martin Ragginger | | (Norway) Egidio Perfetti |
| 6 | | Singapore | (New Zealand) Earl Bamber | (New Zealand) Earl Bamber | (Norway) Egidio Perfetti | (Netherlands) Francis Tjia |
| 7 | R1 | (China) Shanghai 2 | (New Zealand) Earl Bamber | (New Zealand) Earl Bamber | (Malaysia) Alif Hamdan | (Norway) Egidio Perfetti |
| 7 | R2 | (China) Shanghai 2 | | (Austria) Martin Ragginger | | (Malaysia) Alif Hamdan |
| NC | | Macau | (Japan) Keita Sawa | (New Zealand) Earl Bamber | (Netherlands) Francis Tjia | (Malaysia) Alif Hamdan |

== Championship standings ==
=== Scoring system ===
Points were awarded to the top fifteen classified drivers in every race, using the following system:

| Position | 1st | 2nd | 3rd | 4th | 5th | 6th | 7th | 8th | 9th | 10th | 11th | 12th | 13th | 14th | 15th | Pole |
| Points | 20 | 18 | 16 | 14 | 12 | 10 | 9 | 8 | 7 | 6 | 5 | 4 | 3 | 2 | 1 | 1 |

=== Overall ===
| Pos. | Driver | SEP (Malaysia) | SHA1 (China) | | ZHU (China) | | ORD (China) | | INJ (South Korea) | | SIN (Singapore) | SHA2 (China) | | MAC (Macau) | Points |
| Pos. | Driver | R | R1 | R2 | R1 | R2 | R1 | R2 | R1 | R2 | R | R1 | R2 | R | Points |
|---|---|---|---|---|---|---|---|---|---|---|---|---|---|---|---|
| 1 | (New Zealand) Earl Bamber | 3 | 2 | 2 | 1 | 1 | 1 | 1 | 8 | 3 | 1 | 1 | 2 | 1 | 217 |
| 2 | (Austria) Martin Ragginger | 1 | 1 | 1 | 7 | 3 | 2 | 2 | | 1 | 2 | 3 | 1 | 3 | 198 |
| 3 | (Macau) Rodolfo Ávila | 5 | 4 | 3 | 2 | 2 | 3 | 8 | 3 | 9 | 4 | 5 | 3 | 5 | 169 |
| 4 | (Japan) Keita Sawa | 4 | 3 | 4 | 4 | 5 | 9 | 6 | 8 | 6 | 8 | Ret | 8 | 4 | 125 |
| 5 | (China) Ho-Pin Tung | DSQ | 7 | 5 | 3 | 8 | 4 | 7 | 1 | 5 | Ret | 6 | 6 | | 123 |
| 6 | (France) Benjamin Rouget | 6 | 8 | 6 | 5 | 6 | 6 | 13 | 4 | 10 | 3 | 4 | 9 | Ret | 120 |
| 7 | (Switzerland) Alexandre Imperatori | 2 | | | Ret | 7 | 4 | 3 | Ret | 2 | Ret | 2 | 4 | | 105 |
| 8 | (China) Zhang Dasheng | Ret | 5 | 7 | 11 | 4 | 7 | 22 | 6 | 8 | DSQ | 7 | 5 | 6 | 89 |
| 9 | (Norway) Egidio Perfetti | 9 | 8 | 10 | 9 | 12 | 8 | 9 | 10 | 11 | Ret | 8 | Ret | | 87 |
| 10 | (China) Zhang Zhi Qiang | 13 | 6 | 15 | 6 | 15 | 8 | 4 | 2 | 7 | Ret | Ret | 7 | Ret | 85 |
| 11 | (China) Li Zhicong | 9 | Ret | 9 | 8 | Ret | 10 | 10 | 10 | 12 | 12 | 11 | 10 | | 61 |
| 12 | (Singapore) Ringo Chong | 10 | 11 | 10 | 12 | 14 | 15 | 17 | 7 | 14 | 10 | 14 | 12 | | 49 |
| 13 | (Netherlands) Francis Tjia | 11 | | | 9 | 12 | | Ret | 15 | 22 | 5 | 10 | 14 | 10 | 37 |
| 14 | (Singapore) Yuey Tan | 14 | 14 | 12 | 13 | Ret | | 16 | 12 | 15 | 9 | 12 | 13 | 19 | 32 |
| 15 | (Malaysia) Alif Hamdan | 12 | 15 | | | Ret | Ret | Ret | 11 | 13 | 11 | 9 | 11 | 9 | 26 |
| 16 | (China) Wang Jian Wei | 8 | 10 | Ret | Ret | DNS | 11 | 12 | | | | | | | 24 |
| 17 | (China) Li Chao | 16 | | | 14 | 10 | 13 | 15 | 13 | 17 | 11 | | | Ret | 21 |
| 18 | (Hong Kong) Wayne Shen | Ret | 12 | 11 | Ret | 11 | 14 | 14 | Ret | 16 | Ret | Ret | 15 | 13 | 21 |
| 19 | (Malaysia) Adrian Henry D'Silva | Ret | | | Ret | 17 | | 19 | | 23 | 7 | Ret | | | 9 |
| 20 | (Canada) Christian Chia | | 13 | 14 | | | | | 14 | 18 | | | | | 7 |
| 21 | (Hong Kong) Adderly Fong | | | | | | Ret | 10 | | | | | | | 6 |
| 22 | (Hong Kong) John Shen | 15 | | | | 16 | | 18 | | 19 | Ret | 13 | | 15 | 5 |
| 23 | (Netherlands) Marcel Tjia | 20 | | | | 19 | | 21 | | | 13 | | | 18 | 3 |
| 24 | (Malaysia) Natasha Seatter | | | 13 | | | | | | | | | | | 3 |
| 25 | (Hong Kong) Samson Chan | Ret | | | | Ret | | | | 20 | 14 | 15 | | 14 | 3 |
| 26 | (Hong Kong) Alan Siu | 19 | | | 15 | 18 | | | | 21 | 15 | | | | 7 |
| 27 | (Hong Kong) Ma Chi Min | 18 | | | | Ret | | 20 | Ret | 24 | | | | | 0 |
| 28 | (Chinese Taipei) George Chou | | | | | | | DNS | | | | | | | 0 |
Guest drivers ineligible for points
| - | (France) Sébastien Loeb | | | | | | | | | | | | | 2 | 0 |
| - | (South Korea) Récardo Bruins Choi | | | | | | | | | 4 | | | | | 0 |
| - | (Hong Kong) Darryl O'Young | | | | | | | 5 | | | | | | | 0 |
| - | (Japan) Ryo Ogawa | | | | | | | | | | | | | 7 | 0 |
| - | (Japan) Tsubasa Kondo | | | | | | | | | | | | | 8 | 0 |
| - | (Macau) Kevin Tse | | | | | | | | | | | | | 11 | 0 |
| - | (Japan) Hiroaki Nagai | | | | | | | | | | | | | 12 | 0 |
| - | (Hong Kong) Daniel Andrew Bilski | | | | | 13 | | | | | | | | 17 | 0 |
| - | (Japan) Hideto Yasuoka | | | | | | | | | | | | | 16 | 0 |
| - | (Malaysia) Fairuz Fauzy | 17 | | | | | | | | | | | | | 0 |
| - | (Hong Kong) Benny Lim | | | | Ret | | | | | | | | | | 0 |
| - | (Hong Kong) Jacky Yeung | | | | | | | Ret | Ret | Ret | | | | | 0 |
| Pos. | Driver | R | R1 | R2 | R1 | R2 | R1 | R2 | R1 | R2 | R | R1 | R2 | R | Points |
| Pos. | Driver | SEP (Malaysia) | SHA1 (China) | | ZHU (China) | | ORD (China) | | INJ (South Korea) | | SIN (Singapore) | SHA2 (China) | | MAC (Macau) | Points |

== See also ==
- 2013 Porsche Supercup
- 2013 Porsche Carrera Cup Germany
- 2013 Porsche Carrera Cup Great Britain
- 2013 Australian Carrera Cup Championship
- 2013 Porsche Carrera Cup Italia
