= 2010 Formula BMW Europe season =

Seasons
- ← 2009 none →

The 2010 Formula BMW Europe season was the third and final season of the Formula BMW Europe championship. The championship began on 8 May at Barcelona and finished on 12 September at Monza. The series was axed at the end of the season, in favour of a new Formula BMW Talent Cup starting in 2011.

The season was dominated by two drivers in their second season of competing in the championship, Robin Frijns of Josef Kaufmann Racing and Jack Harvey of Fortec Motorsport. Heading into the final round at Monza, Harvey held a seven-point lead over Frijns, but after taking pole position for both races, Harvey's chances took a hit after Javier Tarancón tried to outbrake him into the final corner and collided with him. Frijns won the race, and then a third place for him in the final race to Harvey's victory allowed the Kaufmann driver to claim the championship by eleven points, despite taking six wins to Harvey's seven, with both drivers taking thirteen podiums.

Third place was just as hotly contested, between Mücke Motorsport's Timmy Hansen and EuroInternational's Carlos Sainz Jr. which like the main championship battle, was not settled until the final rounds of the season. Hansen, the son of multiple championship-winning rallycross driver Kenneth, had finished thirteenth in the previous season due to his team being disqualified from two meetings due to a technical infringement, but improved in his second season in the class which included a victory at Hockenheim. Sainz, the son of former double World Rally Champion Carlos Sainz, finished thirteen points behind in fourth having taken a single victory during the season, winning at Silverstone. The season's other victory was taken by Tarancón at Spa-Francorchamps en route to a fifth place championship finish. The Teams' Championship was won by Josef Kaufmann Racing ahead of Fortec Motorsport.

== Teams and drivers ==
- The entry list for the series was released on 2 March 2010. All cars were Mygale FB02 chassis powered by BMW engines. Guest drivers in italics.

Team	No	Driver	Class	Rounds
(Germany) Josef Kaufmann Racing	4	(Netherlands) Robin Frijns		All
(Germany) Josef Kaufmann Racing	5	(Netherlands) Hannes van Asseldonk	R	All
(Germany) Josef Kaufmann Racing	6	(Finland) Petri Suvanto	R	All
(Germany) Mücke Motorsport	7	(Poland) Maciej Bernacik	R	All
(Germany) Mücke Motorsport	8	(Sweden) Timmy Hansen		All
(United States) EuroInternational	11	(Russia) Daniil Kvyat	R	All
(United States) EuroInternational	12	(Spain) Carlos Sainz Jr.	R	All
(United States) EuroInternational	14	(United States) Michael Lewis		All
(France) DAMS	15	(Spain) Javier Tarancón		All
(France) DAMS	16	(Indonesia) Dustin Sofyan		5
(France) DAMS	16	(United Kingdom) Luciano Bacheta		7–8
(France) DAMS	17	(Malaysia) Fahmi Ilyas		1–6
(France) DAMS	17	(Indonesia) Dustin Sofyan		8
(Germany) Eifelland Racing	18	(Argentina) Facundo Regalia		All
(Germany) Eifelland Racing	19	(France) Côme Ledogar		All
(Germany) Eifelland Racing	20	(Austria) Marc Coleselli	R	All
(United Kingdom) Fortec Motorsport	24	(United Kingdom) Jack Harvey		All
(United Kingdom) Fortec Motorsport	25	(Greece) George Katsinis		All
(United Kingdom) Fortec Motorsport	26	(Switzerland) Christof von Grünigen		All

Icon	Class
R	Rookie Cup

== Calendar ==
- The calendar for the 2010 season was announced on 17 December 2009.

Round		Circuit	Date	Pole position	Fastest lap	Winning driver	Winning team	Supporting
1	R1	(Spain) Circuit de Catalunya, Montmeló	8 May	(United Kingdom) Jack Harvey	(United Kingdom) Jack Harvey	(United Kingdom) Jack Harvey	(United Kingdom) Fortec Motorsport	Spanish Grand Prix
1	R2	(Spain) Circuit de Catalunya, Montmeló	9 May	(United Kingdom) Jack Harvey	(United Kingdom) Jack Harvey	(Netherlands) Robin Frijns	(Germany) Josef Kaufmann Racing	Spanish Grand Prix
2	R1	(Netherlands) Circuit Park Zandvoort	5 June	(Sweden) Timmy Hansen	(United Kingdom) Jack Harvey	(United Kingdom) Jack Harvey	(United Kingdom) Fortec Motorsport	Masters of Formula 3
2	R2	(Netherlands) Circuit Park Zandvoort	6 June	(United Kingdom) Jack Harvey	(Spain) Carlos Sainz Jr.	(Netherlands) Robin Frijns	(Germany) Josef Kaufmann Racing	Masters of Formula 3
3	R1	(Spain) Valencia Street Circuit	26 June	(United Kingdom) Jack Harvey	(Netherlands) Robin Frijns	(United Kingdom) Jack Harvey	(United Kingdom) Fortec Motorsport	European Grand Prix
3	R2	(Spain) Valencia Street Circuit	27 June	(United Kingdom) Jack Harvey	(Spain) Javier Tarancón	(United Kingdom) Jack Harvey	(United Kingdom) Fortec Motorsport	European Grand Prix
4	R1	(United Kingdom) Silverstone Circuit	10 July	(Spain) Carlos Sainz Jr.	(United Kingdom) Jack Harvey	(United Kingdom) Jack Harvey	(United Kingdom) Fortec Motorsport	British Grand Prix
4	R2	(United Kingdom) Silverstone Circuit	11 July	(Spain) Carlos Sainz Jr.	(Spain) Carlos Sainz Jr.	(Spain) Carlos Sainz Jr.	(United States) EuroInternational	British Grand Prix
5	R1	(Germany) Hockenheimring	24 July	(Netherlands) Robin Frijns	(United Kingdom) Jack Harvey	(Sweden) Timmy Hansen	(Germany) Mücke Motorsport	German Grand Prix
5	R2	(Germany) Hockenheimring	25 July	(Netherlands) Robin Frijns	(United Kingdom) Jack Harvey	(Netherlands) Robin Frijns	(Germany) Josef Kaufmann Racing	German Grand Prix
6	R1	(Hungary) Hungaroring, Mogyoród	31 July	(Netherlands) Robin Frijns	(Netherlands) Robin Frijns	(Netherlands) Robin Frijns	(Germany) Josef Kaufmann Racing	Hungarian Grand Prix
6	R2	(Hungary) Hungaroring, Mogyoród	1 August	(United Kingdom) Jack Harvey	(United Kingdom) Jack Harvey	(United Kingdom) Jack Harvey	(United Kingdom) Fortec Motorsport	Hungarian Grand Prix
7	R1	(Belgium) Circuit de Spa-Francorchamps	28 August	(France) Côme Ledogar	(Spain) Javier Tarancón	(Spain) Javier Tarancón	(France) DAMS	Belgian Grand Prix
7	R2	(Belgium) Circuit de Spa-Francorchamps	29 August	(France) Côme Ledogar	(Netherlands) Robin Frijns	(Netherlands) Robin Frijns	(Germany) Josef Kaufmann Racing	Belgian Grand Prix
8	R1	(Italy) Autodromo Nazionale Monza	11 September	(United Kingdom) Jack Harvey	(Sweden) Timmy Hansen	(Netherlands) Robin Frijns	(Germany) Josef Kaufmann Racing	Italian Grand Prix
8	R2	(Italy) Autodromo Nazionale Monza	12 September	(United Kingdom) Jack Harvey	(Netherlands) Hannes van Asseldonk	(United Kingdom) Jack Harvey	(United Kingdom) Fortec Motorsport	Italian Grand Prix

== Standings ==
=== Drivers ===
- Points were awarded as follows:

1	2	3	4	5	6	7	8	9	10	11	12	13	14	15	PP
30	24	20	18	16	14	12	10	8	6	5	4	3	2	1	**1**

Pos	Driver	CAT (Spain)		ZAN (Netherlands)		VSC (Spain)		SIL (United Kingdom)		HOC (Germany)		HUN (Hungary)		SPA (Belgium)		MNZ (Italy)		Pts
1	(Netherlands) Robin Frijns	Ret	1	4	1	4	2	2	2	**2**	**1**	**1**	2	2	1	1	3	383
2	(United Kingdom) Jack Harvey	**1**	**3**	1	**9**	**1**	**1**	1	3	3	2	2	**1**	3	4	**Ret**	**1**	372
3	(Sweden) Timmy Hansen	2	2	**3**	4	Ret	6	4	15	1	7	Ret	4	5	6	4	8	240
4	(Spain) Carlos Sainz Jr.	3	6	5	2	7	10	**3**	**1**	11	6	4	3	Ret	Ret	8	6	227
5	(Spain) Javier Tarancón	4	5	7	12	3	4	15	7	8	8	8	Ret	1	2	Ret	10	193
6	(France) Côme Ledogar	13	9	6	3	8	Ret	12	14	4	5	5	6	**7**	**3**	2	12	188
7	(Netherlands) Hannes van Asseldonk	10	11	Ret	5	10	11	9	10	6	3	10	5	4	7	3	5	176
8	(Argentina) Facundo Regalia	7	4	2	7	6	5	5	4	Ret	9	9	9	Ret	12	Ret	7	172
9	(Greece) George Katsinis	5	7	13	Ret	5	7	11	5	7	10	3	10	9	8	Ret	Ret	139
10	(Russia) Daniil Kvyat	9	10	11	Ret	Ret	8	14	11	5	4	6	Ret	6	5	Ret	2	138
11	(Finland) Petri Suvanto	11	12	12	6	Ret	13	8	6	Ret	16	14	7	10	9	9	9	100
12	(Poland) Maciej Bernacik	12	13	8	11	11	9	13	12	9	12	11	8	13†	10	6	11	99
13	(Malaysia) Fahmi Ilyas	Ret	Ret	Ret	Ret	2	3	6	8	10	14	7	Ret					88
14	(United States) Michael Lewis	14	8	9	10	9	15	10	9	14	11	15	11	Ret	11	5	Ret	83
15	(Switzerland) Christof von Grünigen	6	14	10	8	12	14	16	13	13	13	12	12	12	Ret	10	Ret	66
16	(Austria) Marc Coleselli	8	Ret	Ret	DNS	Ret	12	7	16	12	15	13	DSQ	8	13	7	Ret	59
Guest drivers ineligible for championship points
	(United Kingdom) Luciano Bacheta													11	Ret	Ret	4	0
	(Indonesia) Dustin Sofyan									15	Ret					Ret	DNS	0
Pos	Driver	CAT (Spain)		ZAN (Netherlands)		VSC (Spain)		SIL (United Kingdom)		HOC (Germany)		HUN (Hungary)		SPA (Belgium)		MNZ (Italy)		Pts

Colour	Result
Gold	Winner
Silver	Second place
Bronze	Third place
Green	Points classification
Blue	Non-points classification
Blue	Non-classified finish (NC)
Purple	Retired, not classified (Ret)
Red	Did not qualify (DNQ)
Red	Did not pre-qualify (DNPQ)
Black	Disqualified (DSQ)
White	Did not start (DNS)
White	Withdrew (WD)
White	Race cancelled (C)
Blank	Did not practice (DNP)
Blank	Did not arrive (DNA)
Blank	Excluded (EX)

**Bold** – Pole
Italics – Fastest Lap
**R** – Rookie Cup

† — Drivers did not finish the race, but were classified as they completed over 90% of the race distance.

=== Teams ===
	Team	Points
1	(Germany) Josef Kaufmann Racing	656
2	(United Kingdom) Fortec Motorsport	559
3	(United States) EuroInternational	446
4	(Germany) Eifelland Racing	417
5	(Germany) Mücke Motorsport	338
6	(France) DAMS	281
