= Dustin Sofyan =

Indonesian racing driver (born 1994)

- Nationality: Indonesian
- Born: 29 July 1994 (age 32) Jakarta, Indonesia

Previous series
- 2009-10 2010 2011 2011: Formula BMW Pacific; Formula BMW Europe; Formula Pilota China; Formula Abarth

Dustin Sofyan (born 29 July 1994) is an Indonesian former racing driver.

== Career ==
=== Karting ===
Sofyan won third place in the Asian Karting Open Championship - ROK Junior 2006.

=== Asian series ===
Sofyan began his car racing career in his native continent, competing in the Formula BMW Pacific in 2009. He competed in all the races that season and finished in fifth position in the final standings. In 2010, he returned to the Formula BMW Pacific series, where he raced in every round except round 3 in China. He finished seventh in the final standings. He also competed in two rounds of the equivalent Formula BMW Europe, racing in round 5 and 8.

In 2011, Sofyan raced in the Formula Pilota China, where he competed in all the races and finished third in the final overall standings, but won the Asian Trophy, since he was the leader from all the other Asian drivers. He also competed in the Formula Abarth gaining points for the European Championship.

== Racing record ==
=== Career summary ===
Season	Series	Team	Races	Wins	Poles	F/Laps	Podiums	Points	Position
2009	Formula BMW Pacific	Questnet Team Qi-Meritus	15	0	0	0	1	89	5th
2010	Formula BMW Pacific	Meritus	11	1	1	1	4	68	7th
2010	Formula BMW Pacific	EuroInternational	11	1	1	1	4	68	7th
2010	Formula BMW Europe	DAMS	4	0	0	0	0	0†	NC†
2011	Formula Pilota China	EuroInternational	12	0	0	1	5	117	3rd
2011	Formula Abarth	EuroInternational	11	0	0	0	1	33	11th

† – As Sofyan was a guest driver, he was ineligible for points.
