= Jack Harvey (racing driver) =

British racing driver (born 1993)

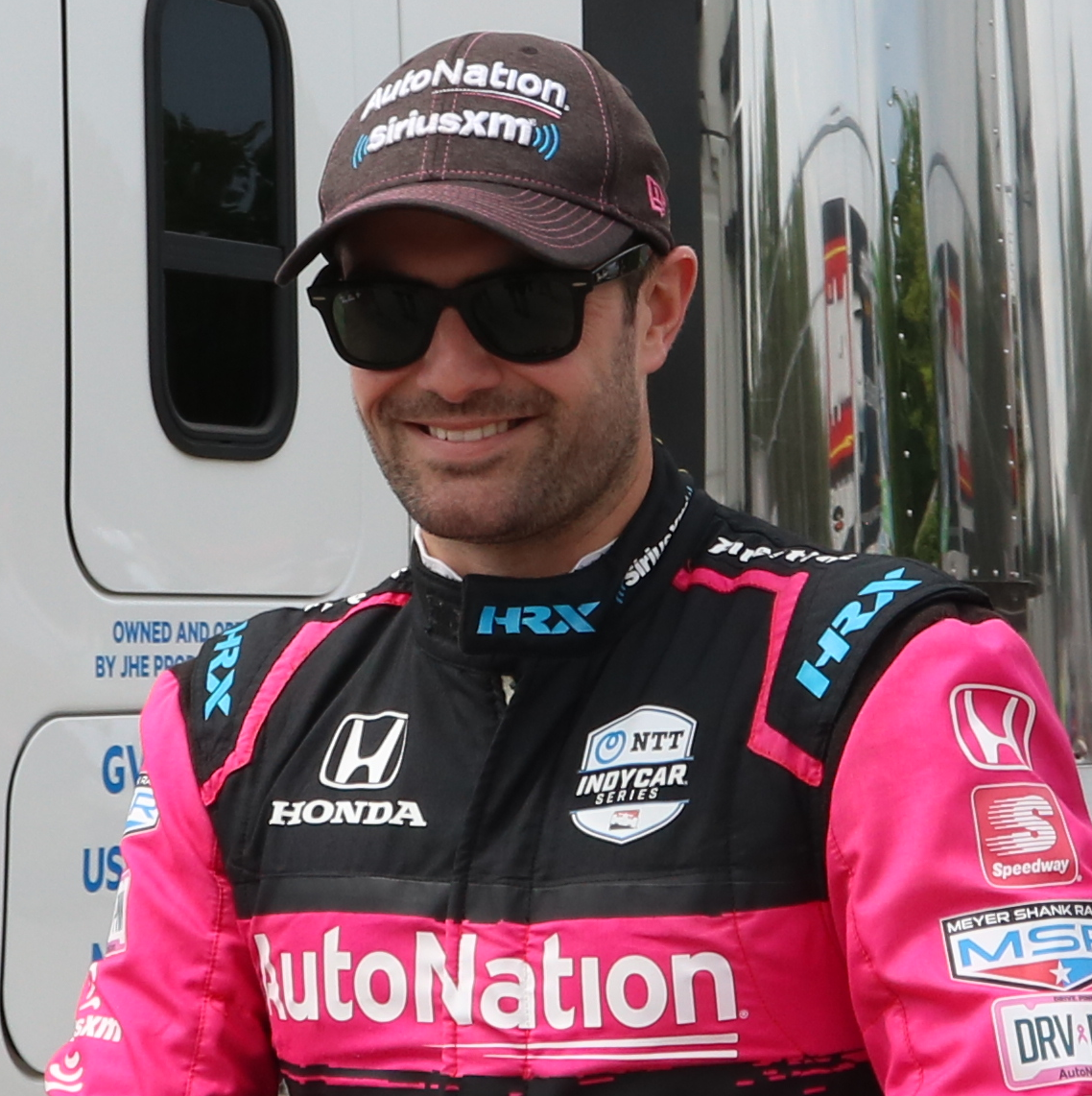
- Harvey at Road America in 2021
- Nationality: (United Kingdom) British
- Born: Jack Joseph Murray Harvey; 15 April 1993 (age 33) Bassingham, Lincolnshire, England
- Categorisation: FIA Gold

IndyCar Series career
- 93 races run over 8 years
- Team: No. 24 (Dreyer & Reinbold Racing)
- Best finish: 13th (2021)
- First race: 2017 Indianapolis 500 (Indianapolis)
- Last race: 2026 Indianapolis 500 (Indianapolis)
Wins	Podiums	Poles
0	1	0

Previous series
- 2013 2011–12 2009–10 2009: GP3 Series; British Formula 3 Formula BMW Europe; Formula BMW Pacific

Championship titles
- 2012: British Formula 3

Jack Joseph Murray Harvey (born 15 April 1993) is a British auto racing driver and pit reporter who competes part-time in the IndyCar Series, driving the No. 24 Chevrolet for Dreyer & Reinbold Racing with Cusick Motorsports. He is a former member of McLaren's Young Driver Programme.

== Career ==
=== Karting ===
Harvey began his kart racing career at the age of nine. In 2006 he won the MSA Super One British title by a single point, and the Kartmasters British Grand Prix, both in the ICA-J class.

In 2007, Harvey became a driver for the Italian Maranello team, in the newly created KF3 category. He ended up winning four trophies by the end of the year, with the Andrea Margutti Trophy, another Kartmasters title, the Italian Open Masters championship, and became European Champion in KF3.

For the 2008 season, Harvey signed with the Birel Motorsport team as a KF2 driver, and became Asia-Pacific Champion.

=== Formula BMW ===
Harvey began his formula racing career in the 2009 Formula BMW Europe season with Fortec Motorsport. Harvey is a member of the Racing Steps Foundation, helping young British drivers achieve success in the national and international series. He finished seventh overall in the championship, with a win at the Masters of Formula 3-supporting round at Zandvoort and two poles at Zandvoort and Monza. Following his successes, the British Racing Drivers' Club made him a member of their "Rising Star" initiative.

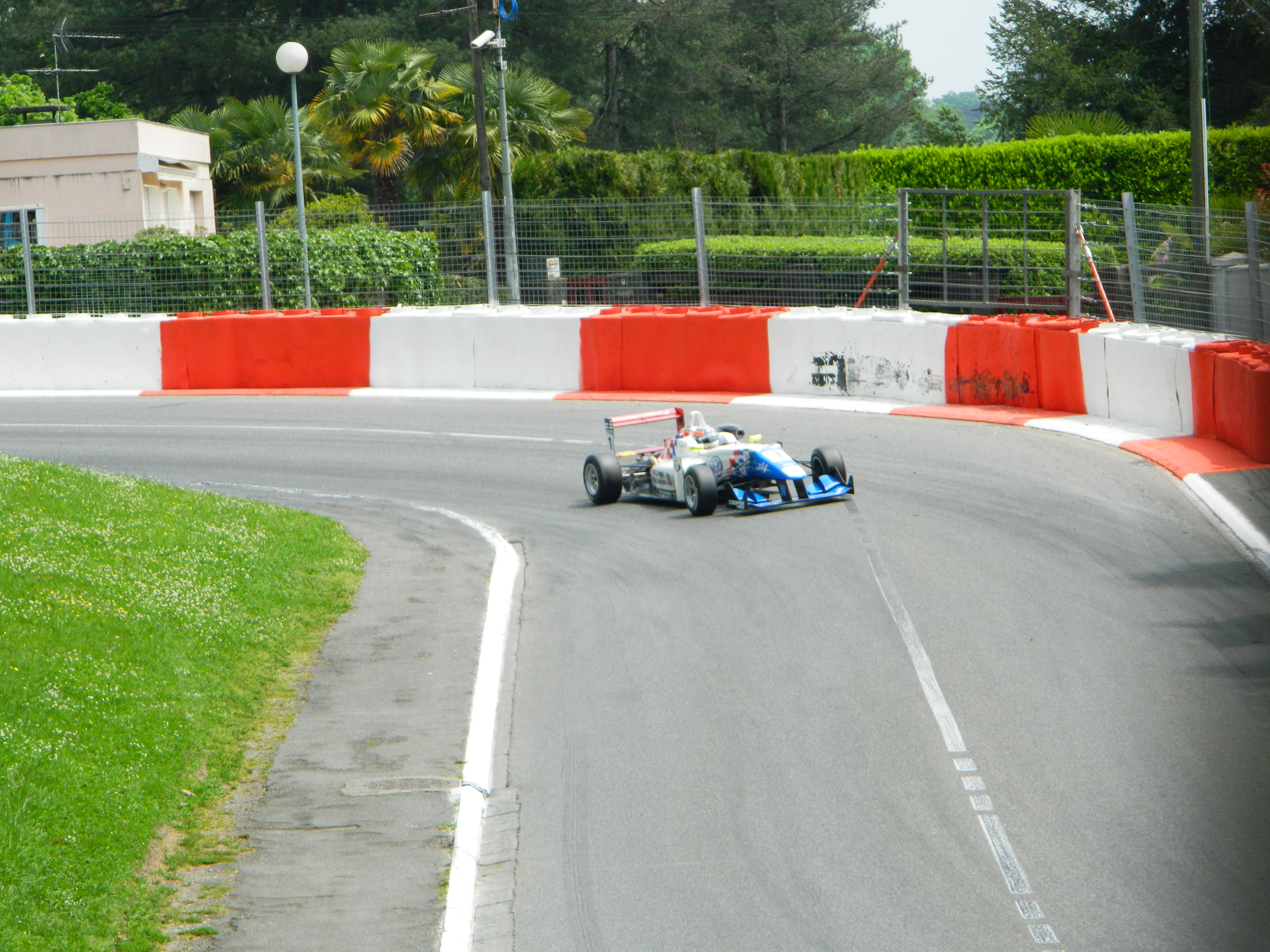
Harvey competing at the 2012 Pau Grand Prix.

In 2010, Harvey finished the year as vice–champion after an intense battle with Robin Frijns, the eventual champion. Harvey entered the final round of the championship with a seven-point lead over Frijns, and extended his lead during the final round by taking the pole position for both races; unfortunately he was pushed out of the track in the first race by DAMS driver Javier Tarancón.

=== Formula 3 ===
For 2011, Harvey moved into the British Formula 3 Championship with Carlin. Harvey finished ninth, scoring one victory and four podiums in his first season. For 2012, he set his sights on winning the championship, opting to extend his commitment with Carlin.

After seven wins amassing a total of twelve podium finishes, Harvey became the 2012 British Formula 3 champion. After 29 races, Harvey gained 319 points. Winning the championship earned Harvey an entry for the Formula Renault 3.5 rookie test.

=== GP3 ===
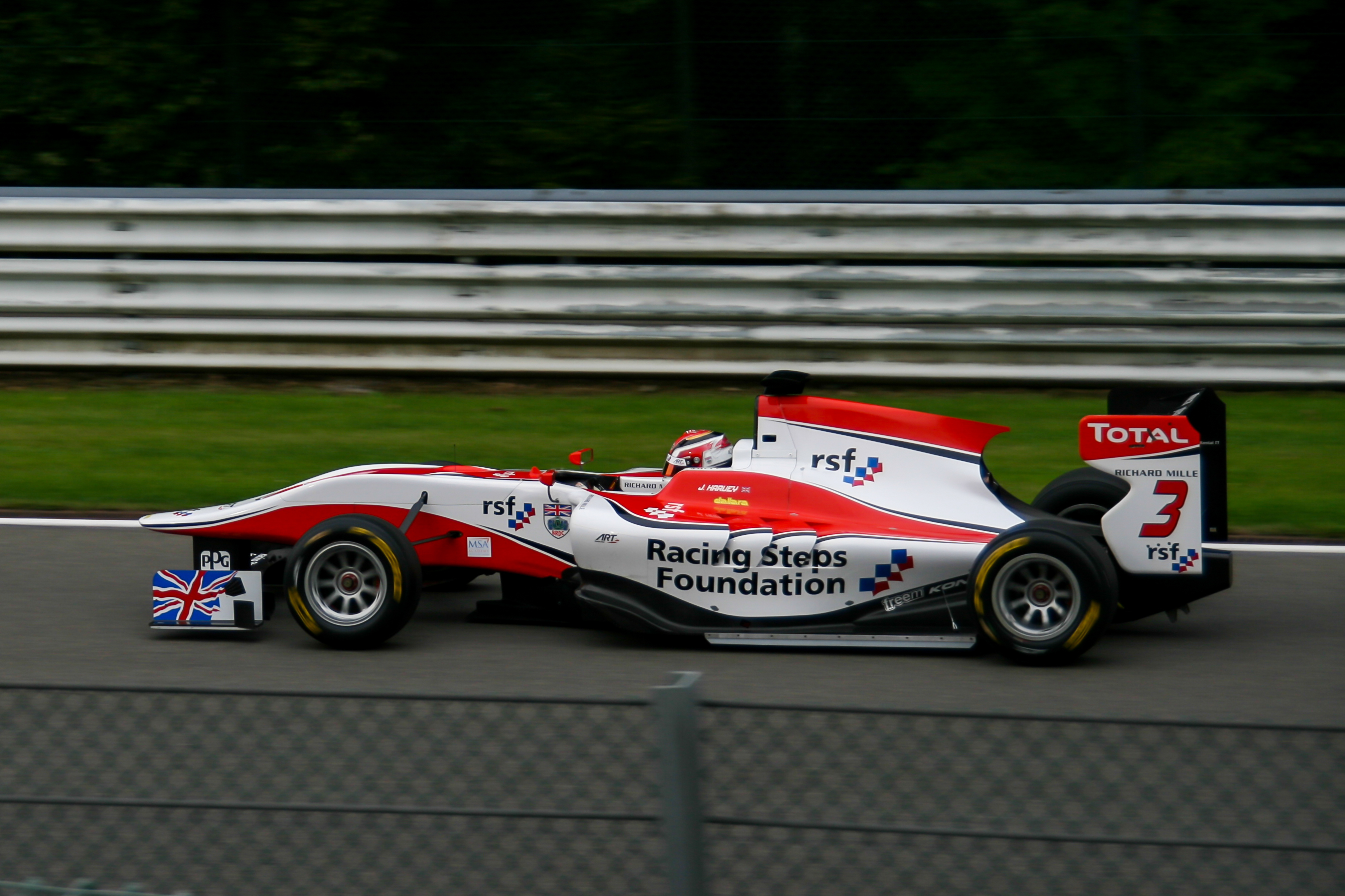
Harvey qualifying for the Spa-Francorchamps round of the 2013 GP3 Series season.

Harvey signed with ART Grand Prix to race in the GP3 Series in 2013 and retained the backing from Racing Steps Foundation. In the same week, Harvey was named official driver coach for Sean Walkinshaw Racing in the new BRDC Formula 4 series. He finished the season in fifth place, winning two races.

=== Indy Lights ===
For the 2014 season, Harvey moved to the United States and signed to race for Schmidt Peterson Motorsports in the Indy Lights series, the established junior feeder series for the IndyCar Series. He finished the season in second place in the championship standings, after collecting four wins and ten podiums in fourteen races. As a consequence, in recognition of his position as the top-performing British driver in North American motorsport, he was also awarded the British Racing Drivers' Club's Earl Howe Trophy for 2014.

Harvey returned to Schmidt Peterson for the 2015 Indy Lights season. He collected two wins, six second-place finishes, and twelve top-fives in sixteen races, which put him runner-up in the overall standings, behind Spencer Pigot.

Although he did not race in 2016, Harvey spent time in America working as a driver coach.

== IndyCar ==
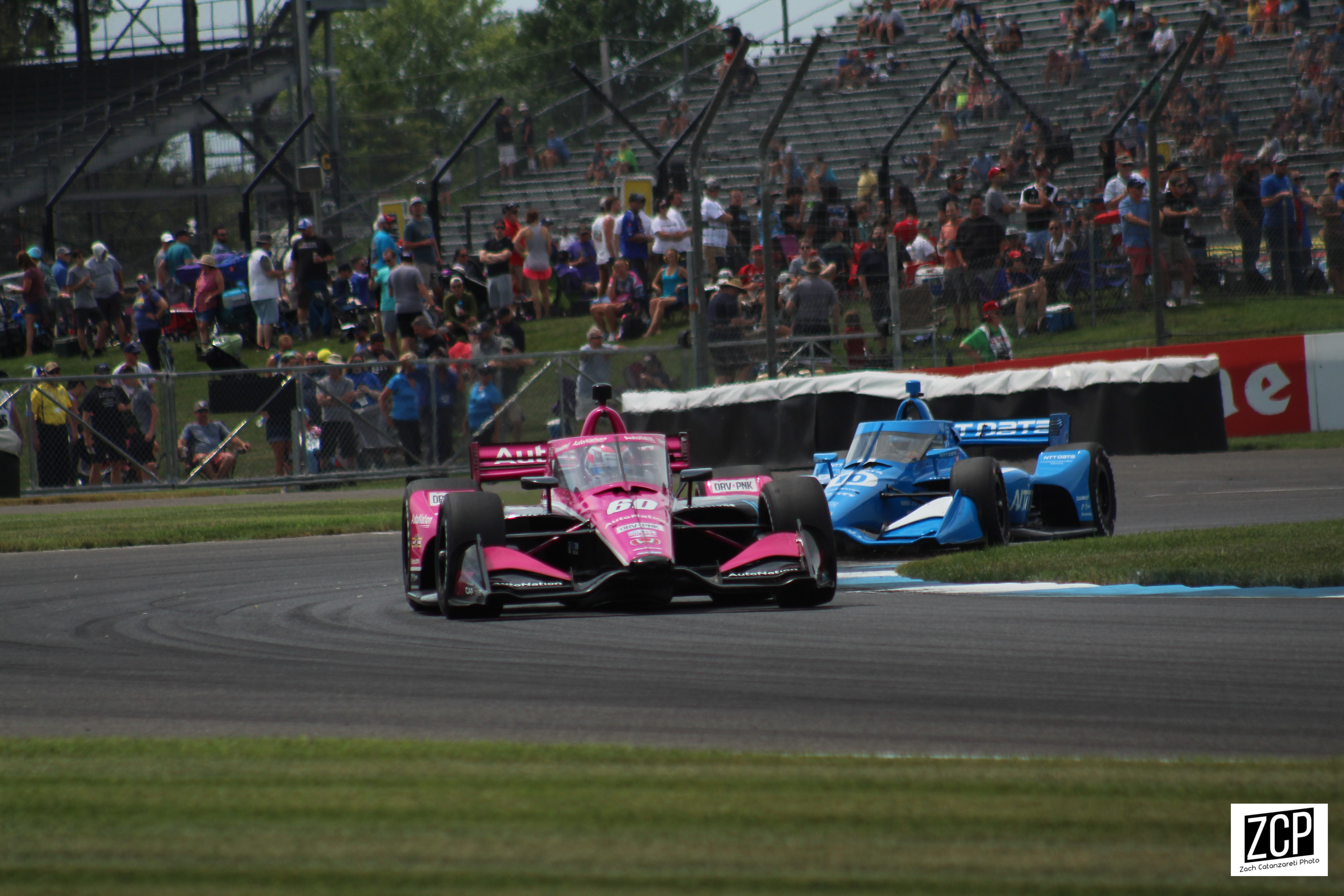
Harvey driving for Meyer Shank Racing at the Indianapolis Motor Speedway.

=== 2017–2020 ===
Harvey made his IndyCar debut at the 2017 Indianapolis 500, driving for Michael Shank Racing in association with Andretti Autosport. He finished 31st after contact with debris from Conor Daly's car on lap 65. Later in the 2017 IndyCar season, Harvey replaced Sebastián Saavedra (who himself had replaced Mikhail Aleshin) at Schmidt Peterson Motorsports for the final two races of the season.

For the 2018 IndyCar season, Harvey rejoined Michael Shank Racing, in a technical partnership with Schmidt Peterson Motorsports, for six races.

In 2019, the Meyer Shank Racing program upped its schedule to ten races. In the pandemic-shortened 2020 season, Harvey ran in all the races.

=== 2021 ===
In 2021, Harvey and Meyer Shank Racing would run a full schedule. Throughout the year, Harvey and MSR showed significant improvements, especially in qualifying where Harvey was frequently a Q2 or better qualifier throughout much of the race weekends. Harvey announced during IndyCar's summer break that he would depart Meyer Shank Racing at the end of the year after being offered a contract by an undisclosed team. On 11 October 2021, it was announced that Harvey would race for Rahal Letterman Lanigan Racing in 2022. He would drive the No. 45 Honda Hy-Vee car.

=== 2023 ===
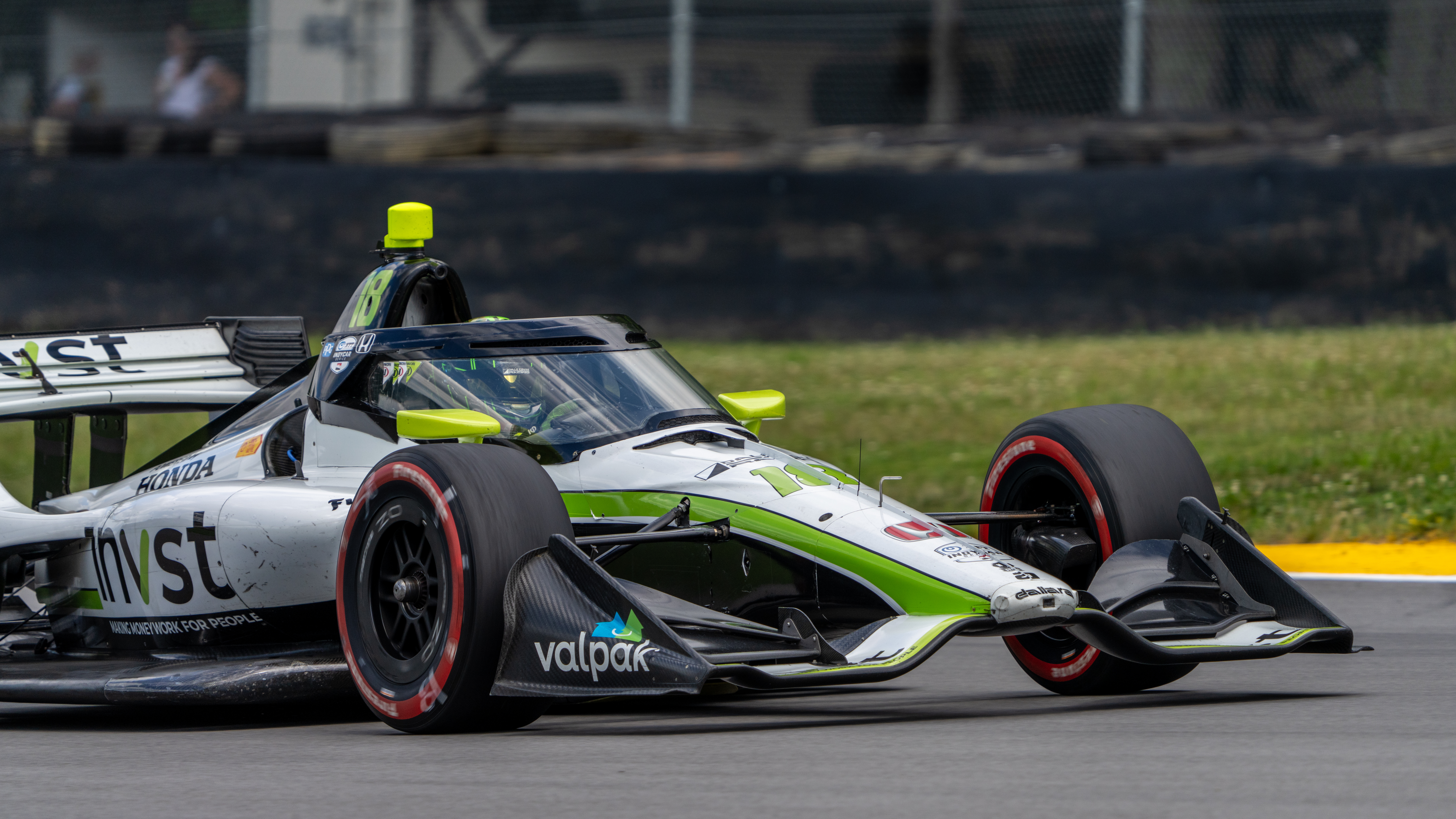
Harvey takes practice for the 2024 Honda Indy 200

Prior to the race at Gateway, Harvey and RLL parted ways. For the last three races of the 2023 season, he was replaced by Conor Daly and Jüri Vips.

=== 2024 ===
On March 5, 2024, Dale Coyne Racing announced that Jack Harvey would run fourteen of the season's seventeen races in their No. 18 Honda. Harvey struggled throughout the season, failing to qualify or finish inside the top-ten. At season's end, Harvey revealed that he had parted ways with Dale Coyne Racing and expressed interest in becoming a commentator for FOX in 2025.

=== 2025 ===
On January 17, 2025, it was announced that Harvey would be attempting to run the Indianapolis 500, driving the No. 24 INVST Chevrolet for Dreyer & Reinbold Racing and Cusick Motorsports. On February 26, FOX announced that Harvey would join Kevin Lee and Georgia Henneberry as the pit reporters for the 2025 IndyCar on FOX broadcasts and being a co-commentator for Indy NXT on FOX.

=== 2026 ===
Harvey announced in September 2025, that he will compete in the 2026 Indianapolis 500, with Dreyer & Reinbold Racing once again.

== Racing record ==
=== Career summary ===
Season	Series	Team	Races	Wins	Poles	FLaps	Podiums	Points	Position
2009	Formula BMW Europe	Fortec Motorsport	16	1	2	1	1	149	7th
2009	Formula BMW Pacific	Eurasia Motorsport	2	0	0	0	0	0†	NC†
2010	Formula BMW Europe	Fortec Motorsport	14	7	8	7	13	372	**2nd**
2011	British Formula 3 International Series	Carlin	30	1	0	1	5	112	9th
2012	British Formula 3 International Series	Carlin	29	7	9	5	12	319	**1st**
2012	FIA Formula 3 European Championship	Carlin	6	0	0	0	0	0	NC†
2013	GP3 Series	ART Grand Prix	16	2	0	1	3	114	5th
2014	Indy Lights	Schmidt Peterson Motorsports	14	4	2	3	10	547	**2nd**
2015	Indy Lights	Schmidt Peterson Motorsports	16	2	3	3	8	330	**2nd**
2017	IndyCar Series	Michael Shank Racing with Andretti Autosport	1	0	0	0	0	57	28th
2017	IndyCar Series	Schmidt Peterson Motorsports	2	0	0	0	0	57	28th
2018	IndyCar Series	Meyer Shank Racing with Schmidt Peterson Motorsports	6	0	0	0	0	103	24th
2019	IndyCar Series	Meyer Shank Racing with Arrow Schmidt Peterson Motorsports	10	0	0	0	1	186	21st
2020	IndyCar Series	Meyer Shank Racing	14	0	0	0	0	288	15th
2021	IndyCar Series	Meyer Shank Racing	16	0	0	1	0	308	13th
2022	IndyCar Series	Rahal Letterman Lanigan Racing	16	0	0	0	0	209	22nd
2023	IndyCar Series	Rahal Letterman Lanigan Racing	14	0	0	0	0	146	24th
2024	IndyCar Series	Dale Coyne Racing	14	0	0	0	0	143	25th
2025	IndyCar Series	DRR-Cusick Motorsports	1	0	0	0	0	12	31st
2026	IndyCar Series	Dreyer & Reinbold Racing	1	0	0	0	0	8	28th

^{†} As Harvey was a guest driver, he was ineligible for points.

=== Complete Formula BMW Europe results ===
(key) (Races in bold indicate pole position) (Races in italics indicate fastest lap)

Year	Entrant	1	2	3	4	5	6	7	8	9	10	11	12	13	14	15	16	D.C.	Points
2009	Fortec Motorsport	CAT; 1; 7	CAT; 2; 19	ZAN; 1; 5	**ZAN**; **2**; 1	SIL; 1; 5	SIL; 2; 9	NÜR; 1; 17	NÜR; 2 Ret	HUN; 1; 14	HUN; 2; 6	VSC; 1; 7	VSC; 2; 9	SPA; 1; 11	SPA; 2; 10	**MNZ**; **1**; 5	MNZ; 2; 16	7th	149
2010	Fortec Motorsport	**CAT**; **1**; 1	**CAT**; **2**; 3	ZAN; 1; 1	**ZAN**; **2**; 9	**VSC**; **1**; 1	**VSC**; **2**; 1	SIL; 1; 1	SIL; 2; 3	HOC; 1; 3	HOC; 2; 2	HUN; 1; 2	**HUN**; **2**; 1	SPA; 1; 3	SPA; 2; 4	**MNZ**; **1** Ret	**MNZ**; **2**; 1	2nd	372

=== Complete British Formula 3 International Series results ===
(key) (Races in bold indicate pole position) (Races in italics indicate fastest lap)

Year	Entrant	Chassis	Engine	1	2	3	4	5	6	7	8	9	10	11	12	13	14	15	16	17	18	19	20	21	22	23	24	25	26	27	28	29	30	D.C.	Points
2011	Carlin	Dallara F308	Volkswagen	MNZ; 1 Ret	MNZ; 2; 10	MNZ; 3; 17	OUL; 1; 11	OUL; 2; 10	OUL; 3; 19	SNE; 1; 15	SNE; 2 Ret	SNE; 3; 12	BRH; 1; 13	BRH; 2; 12	BRH; 3; 6	NÜR; 1; 7	NÜR; 2; 1	NÜR; 3; 14	LEC; 1; 5	LEC; 2; 6	LEC; 3; 3	SPA; 1; 5	SPA; 2; 12	SPA; 3; 10	ROC; 1; 3	ROC; 2; 14	ROC; 3; 6	DON; 1; 3	DON; 2; 9	DON; 3 Ret	SIL; 1; 10	SIL; 2; 6	SIL; 3; 18	9th	112
2012	Carlin	Dallara F312	Volkswagen	**OUL**; **1**; 1	OUL; 2; 6	**OUL**; **3**; 2	MNZ; 1; 7	MNZ; 2; 2	MNZ; 3; 8	PAU; 1; 5	PAU; 2; 8	**ROC**; **1**; 5	ROC; 2; 3	**ROC**; **3**; 1	**BRH**; **1**; 1	BRH; 2; 9	**BRH**; **3**; 1	NOR; 1; 14	NOR; 2; 7	NOR; 3 Ret	SPA; 1; 4	SPA; 2 C	SPA; 3; 6	**SNE**; **1**; 1	SNE; 2; 4	**SNE**; **3**; 3	SIL; 1; 8	SIL; 2; 2	SIL; 3; 8	**DON**; **1**; 1	DON; 2; 6	**DON**; **3**; 1		1st	319

=== Complete GP3 Series results ===
(key) (Races in bold indicate pole position) (Races in italics indicate fastest lap)

Year	Entrant	1	2	3	4	5	6	7	8	9	10	11	12	13	14	15	16	D.C.	Points
2013	ART Grand Prix	CAT; FEA; 6	CAT; SPR; 6	VAL; FEA; 10	VAL; SPR; 12	SIL; FEA; 1	SIL; SPR; 7	NÜR; FEA; 3	NÜR; SPR; 10	HUN; FEA; 4	HUN; SPR; 5	SPA; FEA; Ret	SPA; SPR; Ret	MNZ; FEA; 7	MNZ; SPR; 1	YMC; FEA; 5	YMC; SPR; 4	5th	114

=== American open-wheel racing results ===
(key) (Races in bold indicate pole position) (Races in italics indicate fastest lap)

==== Indy Lights ====
Year	Team	1	2	3	4	5	6	7	8	9	10	11	12	13	14	15	16	Rank	Points	Ref
2014	Schmidt Peterson Motorsports	STP; 3	LBH; 4	ALA; 3	ALA; 5	IMS; 3	IMS; 2	INDY; 5	POC; 3	TOR; 3	**MOH**; 1	**MOH**; 1	MIL; 5	SNM; 1	SNM; 1			**2nd**	**547**	
2015	Schmidt Peterson Motorsports	STP; 2	STP; 2	**LBH**; 10	ALA; 2	ALA; 2	**IMS**; 1	IMS; 5	INDY; 1	TOR; 2	TOR; 2	MIL; 4	IOW; 5	MOH; 11	**MOH**; 10	LAG; 5	LAG; 9	2nd	330	

==== IndyCar Series ====
(key)

Year	Team	No.	Chassis	Engine	1	2	3	4	5	6	7	8	9	10	11	12	13	14	15	16	17	18	Rank	Points	Ref
2017	Michael Shank Racing w/ Andretti Autosport	50	Dallara DW12	Honda	STP	LBH	ALA	PHX	IMS	INDY; 31	DET	DET	TXS	ROA	IOW	TOR	MOH	POC	GTW				28th	57	
2017	Schmidt Peterson Motorsports	7	Dallara DW12	Honda																WGL; 14	SNM; 18		28th	57	
2018	Michael Shank Racing w/ Schmidt Peterson Motorsports	60	Dallara DW12	Honda	STP; 23	PHX																	24th	103	
2018	Meyer Shank Racing w/ Schmidt Peterson Motorsports	60	Dallara DW12	Honda			LBH; 12	ALA	IMS	INDY; 16	DET	DET	TXS	ROA	IOW	TOR	MOH; 20	POC	GTW	POR; 16	SNM; 17		24th	103	
2019	Meyer Shank Racing w/ Arrow Schmidt Peterson Motorsports	60	Dallara DW12	Honda	STP; 10	COA; 10	ALA; 13	LBH; 22	IMS; 3	INDY; 21	DET	DET	TXS	ROA; 15	TOR	IOW	MOH; 10	POC	GTW	POR; 19	LAG; 19		21st	186	
2020	Meyer Shank Racing	60	Dallara DW12	Honda	TXS; 16	IMS; 17	ROA; 23	ROA; 17	IOW; 7	IOW; 7	INDY; 9	GTW; 11	GTW; 13	MOH; 7	MOH; 12	IMS; 8	IMS; 6	STP; 19					15th	288	
2021	Meyer Shank Racing	60	Dallara DW12	Honda	ALA; 11	STP; 4	TXS; 7	TXS; 17	IMS; 23	INDY; 18	DET; 16	DET; 19	ROA; 17	MOH; 19	NSH; 15	IMS; 6	GTW; 10	POR; 4	LAG; 15	LBH; 7			13th	308	
2022	Rahal Letterman Lanigan Racing	45	Dallara DW12	Honda	STP; 13	TXS; Wth	LBH; 15	ALA; 18	IMS; 13	INDY; 24	DET; 15	ROA; 13	MOH; 20	TOR; 19	IOW; 18	IOW; 20	IMS; 20	NSH; 10	GTW; 24	POR; 15	LAG; 20		22nd	209	
2023	Rahal Letterman Lanigan Racing	30	Dallara DW12	Honda	STP; 22	TXS; 18	LBH; 13	ALA; 24	IMS; 20	INDY; 18	DET; 17	ROA; 26	MOH; 18	TOR; 24	IOW; 18	IOW; 19	NSH; 24	IMS; 14	GTW	POR	LAG		24th	146	
2024	Dale Coyne Racing	18	Dallara DW12	Honda	STP; 17	THE	LBH; 25	ALA; 13	IMS; 18	INDY	DET; 17	ROA; 25	LAG; 25	MOH; 26	IOW; 25	IOW; Wth	TOR	GTW; 20	POR; 24	MIL; 16	MIL; 14	NSH; 13	25th	143	
2025	Dreyer & Reinbold Racing w/ Cusick Motorsports	24	Dallara DW12	Chevrolet	STP	THE	LBH	ALA	IMS	INDY; 19	DET	GTW	ROA	MOH	IOW	IOW	TOR	LAG	POR	MIL	NSH		31st	12	
2026	Dreyer & Reinbold Racing	24	Dallara DW12	Chevrolet	STP	PHX	ARL	ALA	LBH	IMS	INDY; 22	DET	GTW	ROA	MOH	NSH	POR	MRK	WSH	MIL	MIL	LAG	28th	8	

* Season still in progress.

==== Indianapolis 500 ====
Year	Chassis	Engine	Start	Finish	Team
2017	Dallara	Honda	27	31	Michael Shank Racing with Andretti Autosport
2018	Dallara	Honda	31	16	Meyer Shank Racing with Schmidt Peterson Motorsports
2019	Dallara	Honda	25	21	Meyer Shank Racing with Arrow Schmidt Peterson Motorsports
2020	Dallara	Honda	20	9	Meyer Shank Racing
2021	Dallara	Honda	20	18	Meyer Shank Racing
2022	Dallara	Honda	32	24	Rahal Letterman Lanigan Racing
2023	Dallara	Honda	32	18	Rahal Letterman Lanigan Racing
2025	Dallara	Chevrolet	26	19	Dreyer & Reinbold Racing w/ Cusick Motorsports
2026	Dallara	Chevrolet	33	22	Dreyer & Reinbold Racing

== Personal life ==
Harvey’s parents operate a steel-fabrication business in his hometown of Lincoln, and he has noted that without racing he might have become involved in the family trade. In 2016, he briefly worked with his father as a laser cutter operator before deciding to move to America to continue pursuing a career in racing.

He is a supporter of his hometown football club Lincoln City, of which he became a part owner of in September 2025.

Harvey is close friends with fellow IndyCar driver, Conor Daly.

Harvey announced a cancer diagnosis in October 2026.

Sporting positions
Preceded by Felipe Nasr	British Formula Three Champion; 2012	Succeeded by Jordan King
