= Natasha Seatter =

Malaysian racing driver (born 1993)

- Seatter in 2013

Personal information
- Born: 7 March 1993 (age 33) Kuala Lumpur, Malaysia

Natasha Seatter (born 7 March 1993) is a Malaysian racing driver.

== Biography ==
Seatter was born on 7 March 1993 in Kuala Lumpur, Malaysia.

Seatter made her debut in karting and junior formula car racing in 2009 with the Petronas Mofaz Racing Team. She was awarded the Petronas Formula Xperience (PFX) scholarship and trained at the Formula Gulf Academy.

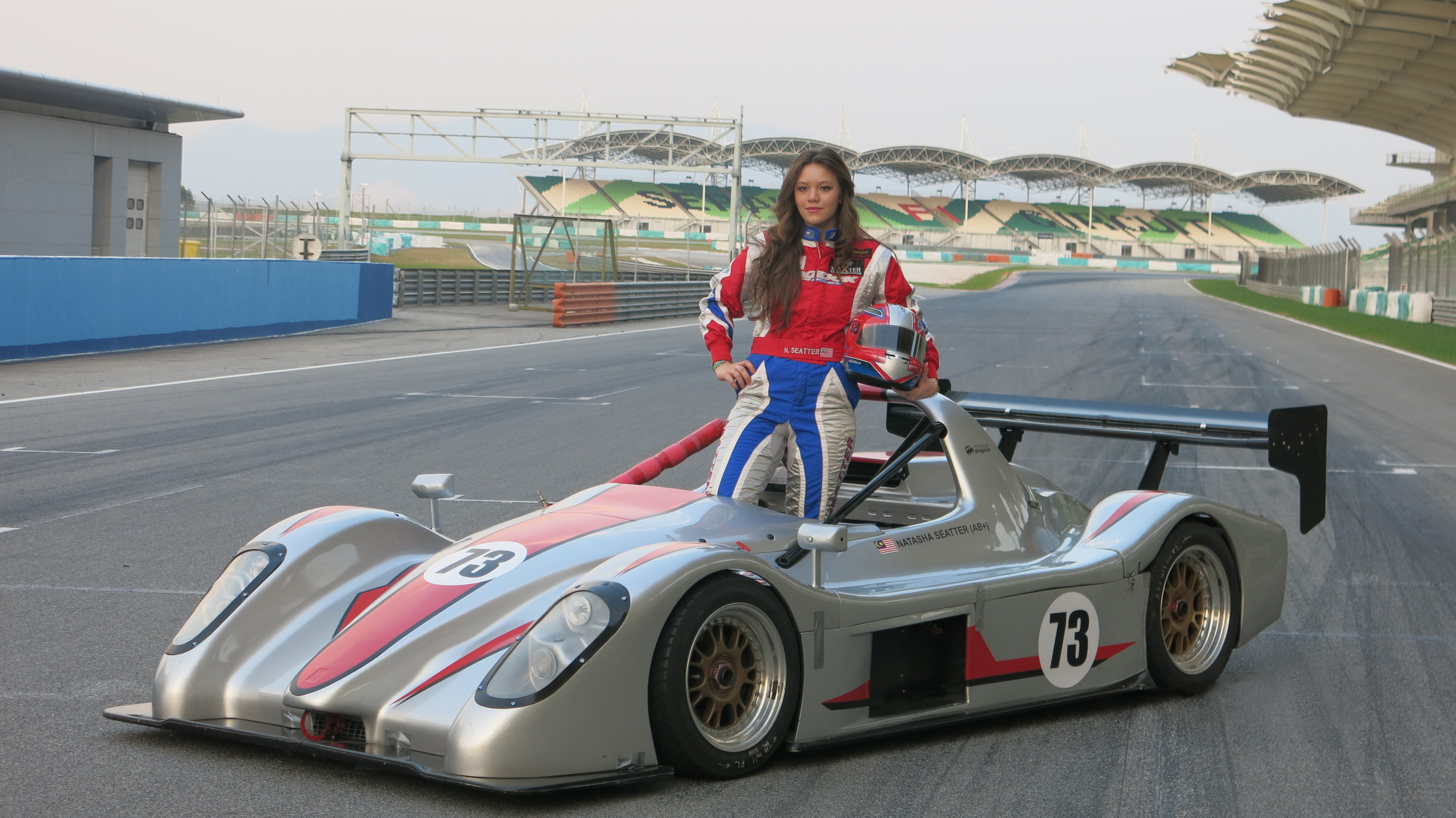
Seatter in 2014

In January 2011, Seatter was the youngest and only female racing driver to be tested and approved by former F1 champions and was invited as guest driver in the Volkswagen Women's Volkswagen Polo Cup Race in Chennai, Tamil Nadu, India, coming third. Also in 2011, Seatter raced at the Ordos Formula Pilota Series event in Inner Mongolia. She finished fourth overall and third in the Asian Driver Class.

In December 2012, Seatter won Round 10 of the Formula Gulf 1000 at the Dubai Autodrome in the United Arab Emirates, driving in a Suzuki RFR F1000, setting the fastest lap of the race and becoming the first woman to win a national race in the UAE. In 2012 she also competed in the Malaysia Merdeka Endurance Race, driving a Volkswagen Scirocco.

In 2013, Seatter competed in the Malaysian Super Series (MSS), driving a Radical SR8, and finished as runner-up in the open GT class. In 2013, she won the Gulfsport Trophy in the final round of the Formula Gulf 1000 series in the United Arab Emirates, following victories in Rounds 3, 4 5 and 6. In the same year, Seatter competed as a guest driver in two races of the Porsche Carrera Cup Asia in Shanghai, China, driving a Porsche 911 GT3 997 for the PICC Team Starchase, finishing 23rd overall.

In 2014, Seatter made her GT Asia debut in Korea, driving an Aston Martin Vantage GT3 for the British team Craft Bamboo Racing, and was honoured with the “Best Performing Driver” award. She placed 46th overall.

Seatter retired from racing in 2015. She had competed in 68 races, had 11 wins and 20 podium finishes before her retirement.

Seatter came out of retirement in 2021 and competed in two Malaysian Championship Series races (MCS) and the Sepang 1,000 km Endurance Race with the BHP Petrol Racing Team. She finished second and third in the races
