= Lombard (surname) =

Lombard is a surname. Notable people with the surname include:

- Adrian Lombard (1915–1967), British aeronautical engineer
- Alain Lombard, French conductor
- Alvin Orlando Lombard (1856–1937), American inventor of the continuous track vehicle
- André Lombard (1950–2025), Swiss chess player
- Anthony Lombard, former mayor of Gibraltar
- Carole Lombard (1908–1942), Hollywood actress
- Claude Lombard (1945–2021), Belgian singer
- Denys Lombard, scholar
- Didier Lombard, French businessman
- Émile Lombard (painter)
- Émile Lombard (biblical scholar)
- Émile Lombard (cyclist)
- Étienne Lombard (1869–1920), French otolaryngologist known for discovering the Lombard effect
- Fleur Lombard, firefighter
- George Lombard (born 1975), Major League Baseball player
- George Lombard Jr. (born 2005), Minor League Baseball player
- Gustav Lombard (1895–1992), German General of the Waffen SS
- Héctor Lombard (born 1978), mixed martial arts fighter
- Henri-Édouard Lombard (1855–1929), French sculptor
- Jean Lombard, French novelist
- Jim Lombard, Florida politician
- John Lombard, football coach
- Karina Lombard, French-American actress
- Lambert Lombard (1505–1566), Flemish Renaissance architect
- Louise Lombard (born 1970 Louise Maria Perkins), British actress
- Marc Lombard, a Scouting leader
- Montserrat Lombard (born 1982), British actress
- Olivier Lombard, French racing driver
- Peter Lombard (archbishop of Armagh) (c. 1555–1625)
- Peter Lombard (c. 1100–1160), scholastic philosopher and bishop
- Rashid Lombard (1951–2025), South African photographer
- Robert Lombard, South African Apostolic clergyman
- Sébastien Lombard, French football player
- Thomas Lombard, French rugby player
- Yvonne Lombard (born 1929), Swedish actress known from the film A Lesson in Love

== See also ==
- Lumbard, another surname
