= 2008 Formula BMW World Final =

Race details
Date	5–7 December 2008	
Official name	4th Formula BMW World Final
Location	Autódromo Hermanos Rodríguez, Mexico City, Mexico
Course	Permanent racing facility 4.463 km (2.773 mi)
Distance	Heat Races; 25 minutes Main Race; 30 minutes
- Main Race

Pole
Driver	(Mexico) Esteban Gutiérrez	Josef Kaufmann Racing

Podium
First	(United States) Alexander Rossi	EuroInternational
Second	(Denmark) Michael Christensen	Josef Kaufmann Racing
Third	(Mexico) Esteban Gutiérrez	Josef Kaufmann Racing

The 2008 Formula BMW World Final was the fourth and the final Formula BMW World Final race, held for the first time at Autódromo Hermanos Rodríguez in Mexico City on 5–7 December 2008. The race was won by EuroInternational's driver Alexander Rossi, who finished ahead Michael Christensen and Esteban Gutiérrez.

== Drivers and teams ==
2008 Entry List
Team	No	Driver	Main series
(United States) Apex-HBR Motorsport USA	2	(Canada) Mikaël Grenier	Formula BMW Americas
(Canada) Team Autotecnica	5	(Canada) Gianmarco Raimondo	Formula BMW Americas
(Canada) Team Autotecnica	6	(Canada) Maxime Pelletier	Formula BMW Americas
(France) DAMS	7	(Serbia) Velibor Jovanovic	Formula BMW Europe
(France) DAMS	8	(France) Jim Pla	Formula BMW Europe
(Germany) Eifelland Racing	9	(United Kingdom) Thomas Hillsdon	Formula BMW Europe
(Germany) Eifelland Racing	10	(Malaysia) Jazeman Jaafar	Formula BMW Europe
(Germany) Eifelland Racing	11	(Germany) David Mengesdorf	Formula BMW Europe
(United States) EuroInternational	12	(United Kingdom) William Buller	Formula BMW Americas
(United States) EuroInternational	14	(Spain) Daniel Juncadella	Formula BMW Americas
(United States) EuroInternational	15	(Canada) David Ostella	Formula BMW Americas
(United States) EuroInternational	16	(United States) Alexander Rossi	Formula BMW Americas
(United States) EuroInternational	17	(Romania) Doru Sechelariu	Formula BMW Americas
(United States) EuroInternational	18	(Brazil) Giancarlo Vilarinho	Formula BMW Americas
(Italy) Euro Junior Team	19	(Colombia) Gabby Chaves	Formula BMW Americas
(Italy) Euro Junior Team	20	(Mexico) Alfonso Toledano Jr.	Formula BMW Americas
(Germany) Josef Kaufmann Racing	21	(Denmark) Michael Christensen	Formula BMW Europe
(Germany) Josef Kaufmann Racing	22	(Mexico) Esteban Gutiérrez	Formula BMW Europe
(Germany) Josef Kaufmann Racing	23	(Argentina) Facu Regalia	Formula BMW Europe
(United Kingdom) Motaworld Racing	24	(United Kingdom) Ollie Millroy	Formula BMW Europe
(United Kingdom) Motaworld Racing	25	(South Africa) Simon Moss	Formula BMW Europe

== Qualifying ==
=== Qualifying session ===
Pos	No	Driver	Team	Time
1	14	(Spain) Daniel Juncadella	EuroInternational	1:35.115
2	8	(France) Jim Pla	DAMS	1:35.235
3	16	(United States) Alexander Rossi	EuroInternational	1:35.292
4	21	(Denmark) Michael Christensen	Josef Kaufmann Racing	1:35.438
5	22	(Mexico) Esteban Gutiérrez	Josef Kaufmann Racing	1:35.477
6	19	(Colombia) Gabby Chaves	Euro Junior Team	1:35.677
7	24	(United Kingdom) Ollie Millroy	Motaworld Racing	1:35.684
8	10	(Malaysia) Jazeman Jaafar	Eifelland Racing	1:35.715
9	12	(United Kingdom) William Buller	EuroInternational	1:35.767
10	2	(Canada) Mikaël Grenier	Apex-HBR Motorsport USA	1:35.799
11	23	(Argentina) Facu Regalia	Josef Kaufmann Racing	1:35.812
12	20	(Mexico) Alfonso Toledano Jr.	Euro Junior Team	1:35.840
13	18	(Brazil) Giancarlo Vilarinho	EuroInternational	1:35.906
14	9	(United Kingdom) Thomas Hillsdon	Eifelland Racing	1:35.942
15	11	(Germany) David Mengesdorf	Eifelland Racing	1:36.147
16	17	(Romania) Doru Sechelariu	EuroInternational	1:36.160
17	15	(Canada) David Ostella	EuroInternational	1:36.278
18	25	(South Africa) Simon Moss	Motaworld Racing	1:36.298
19	5	(Canada) Gianmarco Raimondo	Team Autotecnica	1:36.407
20	6	(Canada) Maxime Pelletier	Team Autotecnica	1:36.855
21	7	(Serbia) Velibor Jovanovic	DAMS	1:37.239

=== Super Pole Competition ===
Pos	No	Driver	Team	Time
1	8	(France) Jim Pla	DAMS	1:35.807
2	16	(United States) Alexander Rossi	EuroInternational	1:36.516
3	14	(Spain) Daniel Juncadella	EuroInternational	1:36.580
4	22	(Mexico) Esteban Gutiérrez	Josef Kaufmann Racing	1:36.614
5	19	(Colombia) Gabby Chaves	Euro Junior Team	1:36.764
6	21	(Denmark) Michael Christensen	Josef Kaufmann Racing	1:36.833
7	24	(United Kingdom) Ollie Millroy	Motaworld Racing	1:36.938
8	10	(Malaysia) Jazeman Jaafar	Eifelland Racing	1:37.070

== Heats ==
=== Heat 1 ===
Pos	No	Name	Team	Laps	Time/Retired	Points
1	22	(Mexico) Esteban Gutiérrez	Josef Kaufmann Racing	16	25:45.802	0
2	21	(Denmark) Michael Christensen	Josef Kaufmann Racing	16	+0.7	2
3	14	(Spain) Daniel Juncadella	EuroInternational	16	+2.2	3
4	16	(United States) Alexander Rossi	EuroInternational	16	+2.6	4
5	2	(Canada) Mikaël Grenier	Apex-HBR Motorsport USA	16	+5.3	5
6	24	(United Kingdom) Ollie Millroy	Motaworld Racing	16	+6.4	6
7	8	(France) Jim Pla	DAMS	16	+8.2	7
8	18	(Brazil) Giancarlo Vilarinho	EuroInternational	16	+11.2	8
9	23	(Argentina) Facu Regalia	Josef Kaufmann Racing	16	+11.7	9
10	17	(Romania) Doru Sechelariu	EuroInternational	16	+12.3	10
11	6	(Canada) Maxime Pelletier	Team Autotecnica	16	+14.7	11
12	10	(Malaysia) Jazeman Jaafar	Eifelland Racing	16	+19.8	12
13	5	(Canada) Gianmarco Raimondo	Team Autotecnica	16	+19.8	13
14	7	(Serbia) Velibor Jovanovic	DAMS	16	+1:31.5	14
Ret	12	(United Kingdom) William Buller	EuroInternational	10	+6 laps	16
Ret	19	(Colombia) Gabby Chaves	Euro Junior Team	8	+8 laps	16
Ret	20	(Mexico) Alfonso Toledano Jr.	Euro Junior Team	8	+8 laps	16
Ret	25	(South Africa) Simon Moss	Motaworld Racing	5	+11 laps	16
Ret	15	(Canada) David Ostella	EuroInternational	5	+11 laps	16
Ret	9	(United Kingdom) Thomas Hillsdon	Eifelland Racing	0	+16 laps	16
Ret	11	(Germany) David Mengesdorf	Eifelland Racing	0	+16 laps	16

=== Heat 2 ===
Pos	No	Name	Team	Laps	Time/Retired	Points
1	14	(Spain) Daniel Juncadella	EuroInternational	16	25:47.862	0
2	16	(United States) Alexander Rossi	EuroInternational	16	+1.6	2
3	22	(Mexico) Esteban Gutiérrez	Josef Kaufmann Racing	16	+3.3	3
4	10	(Malaysia) Jazeman Jaafar	Eifelland Racing	16	+4.6	4
5	21	(Denmark) Michael Christensen	Josef Kaufmann Racing	16	+5.4	5
6	24	(United Kingdom) Ollie Millroy	Motaworld Racing	16	+5.9	6
7	12	(United Kingdom) William Buller	EuroInternational	16	+12.3	7
8	18	(Brazil) Giancarlo Vilarinho	EuroInternational	16	+13.3	8
9	2	(Canada) Mikaël Grenier	Apex-HBR Motorsport USA	16	+16.4	9
10	11	(Germany) David Mengesdorf	Eifelland Racing	16	+16.8	10
11	5	(Canada) Gianmarco Raimondo	Team Autotecnica	16	+24.7	11
12	6	(Canada) Maxime Pelletier	Team Autotecnica	16	+26.1	12
13	17	(Romania) Doru Sechelariu	EuroInternational	16	+26.6	13
14	15	(Canada) David Ostella	EuroInternational	16	+30.9	14
15	20	(Mexico) Alfonso Toledano Jr.	Euro Junior Team	16	+33.6	15
16	19	(Colombia) Gabby Chaves	Euro Junior Team	16	+35.9	16
17	8	(France) Jim Pla	DAMS	16	+35.9	17
18	23	(Argentina) Facu Regalia	Josef Kaufmann Racing	16	+40.2	18
19	7	(Serbia) Velibor Jovanovic	DAMS	16	+56.4	19
20	25	(South Africa) Simon Moss	Motaworld Racing	15	+1 lap	20
Ret	9	(United Kingdom) Thomas Hillsdon	Eifelland Racing	7	+9 laps	22

=== Heat 3 ===
Pos	No	Name	Team	Laps	Time/Retired	Points
1	21	(Denmark) Michael Christensen	Josef Kaufmann Racing	14	26:30.379	0
2	22	(Mexico) Esteban Gutiérrez	Josef Kaufmann Racing	14	+0.2	2
3	2	(Canada) Mikaël Grenier	Apex-HBR Motorsport USA	14	+1.4	3
4	24	(United Kingdom) Ollie Millroy	Motaworld Racing	14	+1.8	4
5	8	(France) Jim Pla	DAMS	14	+2.3	5
6	14	(Spain) Daniel Juncadella	EuroInternational	14	+2.9	6
7	10	(Malaysia) Jazeman Jaafar	Eifelland Racing	14	+3.0	7
8	16	(United States) Alexander Rossi	EuroInternational	14	+3.7	8
9	11	(Germany) David Mengesdorf	Eifelland Racing	14	+3.9	9
10	5	(Canada) Gianmarco Raimondo	Team Autotecnica	14	+4.6	10
11	17	(Romania) Doru Sechelariu	EuroInternational	14	+6.5	11
12	12	(United Kingdom) William Buller	EuroInternational	14	+7.2	12
13	25	(South Africa) Simon Moss	Motaworld Racing	14	+8.1	13
14	19	(Colombia) Gabby Chaves	Euro Junior Team	14	+8.4	14
15	20	(Mexico) Alfonso Toledano Jr.	Euro Junior Team	14	+8.4	15
16	9	(United Kingdom) Thomas Hillsdon	Eifelland Racing	14	+11.4	16
17	18	(Brazil) Giancarlo Vilarinho	EuroInternational	14	+11.4	17
18	15	(Canada) David Ostella	EuroInternational	14	+11.7	18
19	7	(Serbia) Velibor Jovanovic	DAMS	14	+28.7	19
20	6	(Canada) Maxime Pelletier	Team Autotecnica	13	+1 lap	20
Ret	23	(Argentina) Facu Regalia	Josef Kaufmann Racing	7	+7 laps	22

=== Point table ===
Pos	No	Name	Team	Points
1	22	(Mexico) Esteban Gutiérrez	Josef Kaufmann Racing	5
2	21	(Denmark) Michael Christensen	Josef Kaufmann Racing	7
3	14	(Spain) Daniel Juncadella	EuroInternational	9
4	16	(United States) Alexander Rossi	EuroInternational	14
5	24	(United Kingdom) Ollie Millroy	Motaworld Racing	16
6	2	(Canada) Mikaël Grenier	Apex-HBR Motorsport USA	17
7	10	(Malaysia) Jazeman Jaafar	Eifelland Racing	23
8	8	(France) Jim Pla	DAMS	29
9	18	(Brazil) Giancarlo Vilarinho	EuroInternational	33
10	5	(Canada) Gianmarco Raimondo	Team Autotecnica	34
11	17	(Romania) Doru Sechelariu	EuroInternational	34
12	12	(United Kingdom) William Buller	EuroInternational	35
13	11	(Germany) David Mengesdorf	Eifelland Racing	35
14	6	(Canada) Maxime Pelletier	Team Autotecnica	43
15	19	(Colombia) Gabby Chaves	Euro Junior Team	46
16	20	(Mexico) Alfonso Toledano Jr.	Euro Junior Team	46
17	15	(Canada) David Ostella	EuroInternational	48
18	23	(Argentina) Facu Regalia	Josef Kaufmann Racing	49
19	25	(South Africa) Simon Moss	Motaworld Racing	49
20	7	(Serbia) Velibor Jovanovic	DAMS	52
21	9	(United Kingdom) Thomas Hillsdon	Eifelland Racing	54

== Final Race ==
Pos	No	Driver	Team	Laps	Time/Retired	Grid
1	16	(United States) Alexander Rossi	EuroInternational	19	30:34.838	4
2	21	(Denmark) Michael Christensen	Josef Kaufmann Racing	19	+0.6	2
3	22	(Mexico) Esteban Gutiérrez	Josef Kaufmann Racing	19	+2.4	1
4	14	(Spain) Daniel Juncadella	EuroInternational	19	+2.7	3
5	10	(Malaysia) Jazeman Jaafar	Eifelland Racing	19	+3.9	7
6	24	(United Kingdom) Ollie Millroy	Motaworld Racing	19	+4.9	5
7	11	(Germany) David Mengesdorf	Eifelland Racing	19	+5.3	13
8	8	(France) Jim Pla	DAMS	19	+10.5	8
9	12	(United Kingdom) William Buller	EuroInternational	19	+17.1	12
10	23	(Argentina) Facu Regalia	Josef Kaufmann Racing	19	+18.0	18
11	6	(Canada) Maxime Pelletier	Team Autotecnica	19	+19.0	14
12	9	(United Kingdom) Thomas Hillsdon	Eifelland Racing	19	+22.1	21
13	5	(Canada) Gianmarco Raimondo	Team Autotecnica	19	+22.4	10
14	19	(Colombia) Gabby Chaves	Euro Junior Team	19	+23.8	15
15	17	(Romania) Doru Sechelariu	EuroInternational	19	+29.1	11
16	20	(Mexico) Alfonso Toledano Jr.	Euro Junior Team	19	+30.6	16
17	15	(Canada) David Ostella	EuroInternational	19	+30.8	17
18	25	(South Africa) Simon Moss	Motaworld Racing	19	+31.5	19
19	7	(Serbia) Velibor Jovanovic	DAMS	19	+50.4	20
20	18	(Brazil) Giancarlo Vilarinho	EuroInternational	19	+57.1	9
Ret	2	(Canada) Mikaël Grenier	Apex-HBR Motorsport USA	18	+1 lap	6
