= 2009 Formula BMW Americas season =

Seasons
- ← 2008 none →

The 2009 Formula BMW Americas season was the sixth, and final, season of the Formula BMW Americas series. The championship was contested over fourteen races at six meetings, supporting various series such as the World Touring Car Championship and the American Le Mans Series. Gabriel Chaves was the final series champion, having finished in the top three in all fourteen races. The series was cancelled on July 31, 2009 as a result of a poor economic climate (which also led to the discontinuation of BMW's Formula One outfit).

== Teams and drivers ==
All cars were Mygale FB02 chassis powered by BMW engines.

Team	No	Driver	Class	Rounds
(United States) EuroInternational	2	(Colombia) Gabriel Chaves		All
(United States) EuroInternational	5	(Dominican Republic) Daniel Vela	R	1
(United States) EuroInternational	5	(France) Olivier Lombard	G	2
(United States) EuroInternational	9	(Brazil) Giancarlo Vilarinho		All
(United States) EuroInternational	12	(France) Olivier Lombard	G	5
(United States) EuroInternational	42	(United States) Michael Lewis	R	All
(United States) Euro Junior Team	5	(Dominican Republic) Daniel Vela	R	3–6
(United States) Euro Junior Team	6	(France) Wilson Philippe	R	All
(Canada) Jensen MotorSport	13	(United States) Barrett Mertins	R	All
(Canada) Jensen MotorSport	24	(Panama) Freddy Zebede		1
(Canada) Autotecnica	14	(Canada) Alex Ellis	R	All
(Canada) Autotecnica	50	(Canada) Gianmarco Raimondo		All
(United States) Team Apex	18	(Brazil) João Victor Horto	R	All
(United States) Team Apex	19	(Colombia) Martin Sala	R	All
(United States) Team Apex	20	(Australia) James Kovacic	R	All
(United States) Robali Motorsports	21	(United States) Robert Garcia	R	1–4

Icon	Class
R	Rookie Cup
G	Guest drivers ineligible to score points

== Calendar ==
Round		Circuit	Date	Pole position	Fastest lap	Winning driver	Winning team
1	R1	(Mexico) Autódromo Miguel E. Abed	March 21	(Colombia) Gabriel Chaves	(Colombia) Gabriel Chaves	(Colombia) Gabriel Chaves	(United States) EuroInternational
1	R2	(Mexico) Autódromo Miguel E. Abed	March 22	(Colombia) Gabriel Chaves	(Canada) Alex Ellis	(Colombia) Gabriel Chaves	(United States) EuroInternational
2	R1	(United States) Virginia International Raceway	April 25	(Brazil) Giancarlo Vilarinho	(Brazil) Giancarlo Vilarinho	(Brazil) Giancarlo Vilarinho	(United States) EuroInternational
2	R2	(United States) Virginia International Raceway	April 26	(Brazil) Giancarlo Vilarinho	(Colombia) Gabriel Chaves	(Brazil) Giancarlo Vilarinho	(United States) EuroInternational
3	R1	(United States) Miller Motorsports Park	May 16	(Brazil) Giancarlo Vilarinho	(Brazil) Giancarlo Vilarinho	(Brazil) Giancarlo Vilarinho	(United States) EuroInternational
3	R2	(United States) Miller Motorsports Park	May 17	(Brazil) Giancarlo Vilarinho	(Brazil) Giancarlo Vilarinho	(Brazil) Giancarlo Vilarinho	(United States) EuroInternational
3	R3	(United States) Miller Motorsports Park	May 17	(Brazil) Giancarlo Vilarinho	(Brazil) Giancarlo Vilarinho	(Brazil) Giancarlo Vilarinho	(United States) EuroInternational
4	R1	(United States) Lime Rock Park	July 18	(Colombia) Gabriel Chaves	(Australia) James Kovacic	(Colombia) Gabriel Chaves	(United States) EuroInternational
4	R2	(United States) Lime Rock Park	July 18	(Canada) Alex Ellis	(Australia) James Kovacic	(Australia) James Kovacic	(United States) Team Apex
5	R1	(United States) Road America	August 15	(Brazil) Giancarlo Vilarinho	(Canada) Alex Ellis	(Brazil) Giancarlo Vilarinho	(United States) EuroInternational
5	R2	(United States) Road America	August 16	(Brazil) Giancarlo Vilarinho	(Brazil) Giancarlo Vilarinho	(Colombia) Gabriel Chaves	(United States) EuroInternational
5	R3	(United States) Road America	August 16	(Brazil) Giancarlo Vilarinho	(France) Wilson Philippe	(Colombia) Gabriel Chaves	(United States) EuroInternational
6	R1	(Canada) Mosport International Raceway	August 29	(Canada) Gianmarco Raimondo	(Brazil) Giancarlo Vilarinho	(Canada) Gianmarco Raimondo	(Canada) Autotecnica
6	R2	(Canada) Mosport International Raceway	August 30	(Brazil) Giancarlo Vilarinho	(Australia) James Kovacic	(Brazil) Giancarlo Vilarinho	(United States) EuroInternational

== Standings ==
Points were awarded as follows:

Position	**1st**	**2nd**	**3rd**	**4th**	**5th**	**6th**	**7th**	**8th**	**9th**	**10th**	**PP**
Points	20	15	12	10	8	6	4	3	2	1	1

Pos	Driver	PUE (Mexico)		VIR (United States)		MMP (United States)			LRP (United States)		ROA (United States)			MOS (Canada)		Pts
1	(Colombia) Gabriel Chaves	**1**	**1**	2	2	2	3	2	**1**	2	2	1	1	2	2	235
2	(Brazil) Giancarlo Vilarinho	2	Ret	**1**	**1**	**1**	**1**	**1**	8	5	**1**	**10**	**Ret**	3	**1**	187
3	(Canada) Gianmarco Raimondo	Ret	2	4	3	3	4	3	2	3	3	DSQ	Ret	**1**	3	143
4	(United States) Michael Lewis	4	8	Ret	5	4	2	4	DSQ	6	6	3	3	5	4	111
5	(Australia) James Kovacic	3	4	8	8	5	5	5	3	1	11	4	Ret	Ret	5	102
6	(Canada) Alex Ellis	9	3	3	6	6	6	6	5	**10**	4	DSQ	2	4	DSQ	95
7	(Brazil) João Victor Horto	6	7	5	7	9	7	7	7	4	5	2	5	6	6	91
8	(Dominican Republic) Daniel Vela	5	5			7	DSQ	9	4	7	9	6	Ret	7	8	56
9	(Colombia) Martin Sala	7	Ret	6	4	8	10	11	6	Ret	8	7	7	9	7	54
10	(France) Wilson Philippe	10	9	7	9	12	9	8	DSQ	8	10	8	6	8	9	38
11	(United States) Barrett Mertins	Ret	DSQ	10	DSQ	11	8	10	9	9	Ret	9	8	10	10	19
12	(Panama) Freddy Zebede	8	6													9
13	(United States) Robert Garcia	Ret	10	Ret	10	10	11	Ret	Ret	Ret						3
Guest driver ineligible for points
	(France) Olivier Lombard			9	DSQ						7	5	4			0
Pos	Driver	PUE (Mexico)		VIR (United States)		MMP (United States)			LRP (United States)		ROA (United States)			MOS (Canada)		Pts

Colour	Result
Gold	Winner
Silver	Second place
Bronze	Third place
Green	Points classification
Blue	Non-points classification
Blue	Non-classified finish (NC)
Purple	Retired, not classified (Ret)
Red	Did not qualify (DNQ)
Red	Did not pre-qualify (DNPQ)
Black	Disqualified (DSQ)
White	Did not start (DNS)
White	Withdrew (WD)
White	Race cancelled (C)
Blank	Did not practice (DNP)
Blank	Did not arrive (DNA)
Blank	Excluded (EX)

**Bold** – Pole
Italics – Fastest Lap
