= Émile Lombard =

Émile Lombard may refer to:

- Émile Lombard (biblical scholar) (1875–1963), French-Swiss biblical scholar
- Émile Lombard (cyclist), Belgian road bicycle racer
- Émile Lombard (painter) (1883–?), French painter
