= 2008 Formula BMW Americas season =

Seasons
- ← 2007 2009 →

The 2008 Formula BMW Americas season was the fifth season of Formula BMW Americas, formerly Formula BMW USA, an open wheel racing series for junior drivers, whose mission is to develop talented young drivers and introduce them to auto racing.

The championship was mainly raced in USA, the only exceptions are in June for the Canadian Grand Prix in Montreal and in November for the Brazilian Grand Prix, both as a Formula One support race. The series crowned champion Alexander Rossi.

== Teams and drivers ==
All cars were Mygale FB02 chassis powered by BMW engines.

Team	No	Driver	Class	Rounds
(Canada) Jensen Motorsport	2	(Serbia) Velibor Jovanovic	R	1–2
(Canada) Jensen Motorsport	2	(United States) Corey Dalenberg		5
(Brazil) Amir Nasr Racing	6	(Brazil) Felipe Nasr	R	7
(Brazil) Amir Nasr Racing	12	(Brazil) Lucas Foresti	R	7
(United States) EuroInternational	7	(Brazil) Ricardo Favoretto		1–4
(United States) EuroInternational	7	(France) Adrien Tambay	G	5
(United States) EuroInternational	7	(Mexico) Alfonso Toledeno		6–7
(United States) EuroInternational	9	(Brazil) Giancarlo Vilarinho	R	All
(United States) EuroInternational	16	(United States) Alexander Rossi		All
(United States) EuroInternational	29	(Canada) David Ostella	R	All
(United States) Apex-HBR Racing Team	10	(Canada) Maxime Pelletier		1-5
(United States) Apex-HBR Racing Team	17	(Canada) Mikaël Grenier	R	All
(United States) Apex-HBR Racing Team	19	(Brazil) Alexandre Ruiz	R	All
(United States) Apex-HBR Racing Team	20	(Venezuela) Jorge Gonzalvez		All
(Italy) Euro Junior Team	11	(Spain) Daniel Juncadella	G	2, 4, 7
(Canada) Atlantic Racing	14	(United Arab Emirates) Asad Rahman	G R	2, 4
(Canada) Atlantic Racing	66	(United Kingdom) Ollie Millroy	G R	2, 7
(Canada) Team Autotecnica	15	(Romania) Doru Sechelariu	G	2
(Canada) Team Autotecnica	32	(United Kingdom) William Buller	G	2
(Canada) Team Autotecnica	50	(Canada) Gianmarco Raimondo	R	All
(Canada) Team Autotecnica	53	(Colombia) Gabby Chaves	G	5
(Canada) Team Autotecnica	70	(Brazil) Ricardo Favoretto		5–7
(United States) Integra Motorsports	18	(Romania) Mihai Marinescu	G	2

Icon	Class
R	Rookie Cup
G	Guest drivers ineligible to score points

== Races ==
Round		Circuit	Date	Pole position	Fastest lap	Winning driver	Winning team
1	R1	(United States) Mazda Raceway Laguna Seca	17 May	(United States) Alexander Rossi	(Canada) David Ostella	(Canada) Gianmarco Raimondo	(Canada) Team Autotecnica
1	R2	(United States) Mazda Raceway Laguna Seca	18 May	(Brazil) Ricardo Favoretto	(United States) Alexander Rossi	(Canada) Gianmarco Raimondo	(Canada) Team Autotecnica
2	R1	(Canada) Circuit Gilles Villeneuve	8 June	(Brazil) Ricardo Favoretto	(Canada) Gianmarco Raimondo	(Brazil) Ricardo Favoretto	(United States) EuroInternational
2	R2	(Canada) Circuit Gilles Villeneuve	9 June	(Canada) Gianmarco Raimondo	(Canada) Mikaël Grenier	(United States) Alexander Rossi	(United States) EuroInternational
3	R1	(United States) Mid-Ohio Sports Car Course	21 June	(United States) Alexander Rossi	(United States) Alexander Rossi	(United States) Alexander Rossi	(United States) EuroInternational
3	R2	(United States) Mid-Ohio Sports Car Course	22 June	(United States) Alexander Rossi	(United States) Alexander Rossi	(United States) Alexander Rossi	(United States) EuroInternational
4	R1	(United States) Lime Rock Park	11 July	Cancelled			
4	R2	(United States) Lime Rock Park	12 July	(Brazil) Ricardo Favoretto	(United States) Alexander Rossi	(Spain) Daniel Juncadella	(United States) EuroInternational
4	R3	(United States) Lime Rock Park	12 July	(United States) Alexander Rossi	(United States) Alexander Rossi	(United States) Alexander Rossi	(United States) EuroInternational
5	R1	(United States) Road America	8 August	(United States) Alexander Rossi	(France) Adrien Tambay	(United States) Alexander Rossi	(United States) EuroInternational
5	R2	(United States) Road America	9 August	(United States) Alexander Rossi	(United States) Alexander Rossi	(United States) Alexander Rossi	(United States) EuroInternational
5	R3	(United States) Road America	10 August	(Canada) Mikaël Grenier	(Colombia) Gabby Chaves	(France) Adrien Tambay	(United States) Apex-HBR Racing Team
6	R1	(United States) New Jersey Motorsports Park	27 September	(United States) Alexander Rossi	(United States) Alexander Rossi	(United States) Alexander Rossi	(United States) EuroInternational
6	R2	(United States) New Jersey Motorsports Park	28 September	(United States) Alexander Rossi	(Brazil) Giancarlo Vilarinho	(United States) Alexander Rossi	(United States) EuroInternational
6	R3	(United States) New Jersey Motorsports Park	28 September	Cancelled			
7	R1	(Brazil) Autódromo José Carlos Pace	1 November	(United States) Alexander Rossi	(United States) Alexander Rossi	(United States) Alexander Rossi	(United States) EuroInternational
7	R2	(Brazil) Autódromo José Carlos Pace	2 November	(United States) Alexander Rossi	(United States) Alexander Rossi	(United States) Alexander Rossi	(United States) EuroInternational

== Standings ==
Points were awarded as follows:

Position	**1st**	**2nd**	**3rd**	**4th**	**5th**	**6th**	**7th**	**8th**	**9th**	**10th**	**PP**
Points	20	15	12	10	8	6	4	3	2	1	1

=== Drivers' Championship ===
Pos	Driver	LAG (United States)		CGV (Canada)		MOH (United States)		LIM (United States)			ROA (United States)			NJM (United States)			INT (Brazil)		Pts
1	(United States) Alexander Rossi	**10**	2	3	1	**1**	**1**	C	5	**1**	**1**	**1**	11	**1**	**1**	C	**1**	**1**	250
2	(Brazil) Ricardo Favoretto	2	**Ret**	**1**	Ret	2	2	C	**2**	2	8	5	4	7	9	C	11	4	153
3	(Canada) Gianmarco Raimondo	1	1	2	**Ret**	7	8	C	4	3	10	7	Ret	3	6	C	6	5	134
4	(Canada) Mikaël Grenier	3	8	DSQ	10	6	4	C	7	4	3	9	**2**	8	2	C	3	Ret	126
5	(Brazil) Alexandre Ruiz	5	4	Ret	5	4	6	C	9	9	4	3	3	5	4	C	9	9	118
6	(Brazil) Giancarlo Vilarinho	8	5	7	2	9	3	C	10	8	5	10	5	2	3	C	4	Ret	116
7	(Venezuela) Jorge Goncalvez	6	6	6	4	5	9	C	8	Ret	6	6	6	6	5	C	Ret	11	90
8	(Canada) Maxime Pelletier	4	3	DSQ	11	3	5	C	3	6	9	11	8						77
9	(Canada) David Ostella	7	9	Ret	DSQ	8	7	C	6	5	11	8	7	4	7	C	12	8	64
10	(Brazil) Felipe Nasr																5	3	25
11	(Serbia) Velibor Jovanovic	9	7	9	7														20
12	(Mexico) Alfonso Toledano													9	8	C	7	7	19
13	(Brazil) Lucas Foresti																10	10	6
14	(United States) Corey Dalenberg										12	Ret	9						4
Guest drivers ineligible to score points
	(Spain) Daniel Juncadella			4	Ret			C	1	7							2	2	
	(France) Adrien Tambay										2	2	1						
	(United Kingdom) Ollie Millroy			Ret	6												8	6	
	(Romania) Doru Sechelariu			8	3														
	(Colombia) Gabby Chaves										7	4	10						
	(Romania) Mihai Marinescu			5	Ret														
	(United Arab Emirates) Asad Rahman			10	8			C	11	Ret									
	(United Kingdom) William Buller			12	9														
Pos	Driver	LAG (United States)		CGV (Canada)		MOH (United States)		LIM (United States)			ROA (United States)			NJM (United States)			INT (Brazil)		Pts

Colour	Result
Gold	Winner
Silver	Second place
Bronze	Third place
Green	Points classification
Blue	Non-points classification
Blue	Non-classified finish (NC)
Purple	Retired, not classified (Ret)
Red	Did not qualify (DNQ)
Red	Did not pre-qualify (DNPQ)
Black	Disqualified (DSQ)
White	Did not start (DNS)
White	Withdrew (WD)
White	Race cancelled (C)
Blank	Did not practice (DNP)
Blank	Did not arrive (DNA)
Blank	Excluded (EX)

**Bold** - Pole
Italics - Fastest Lap
