= Mikaël Grenier =

Canadian racing driver

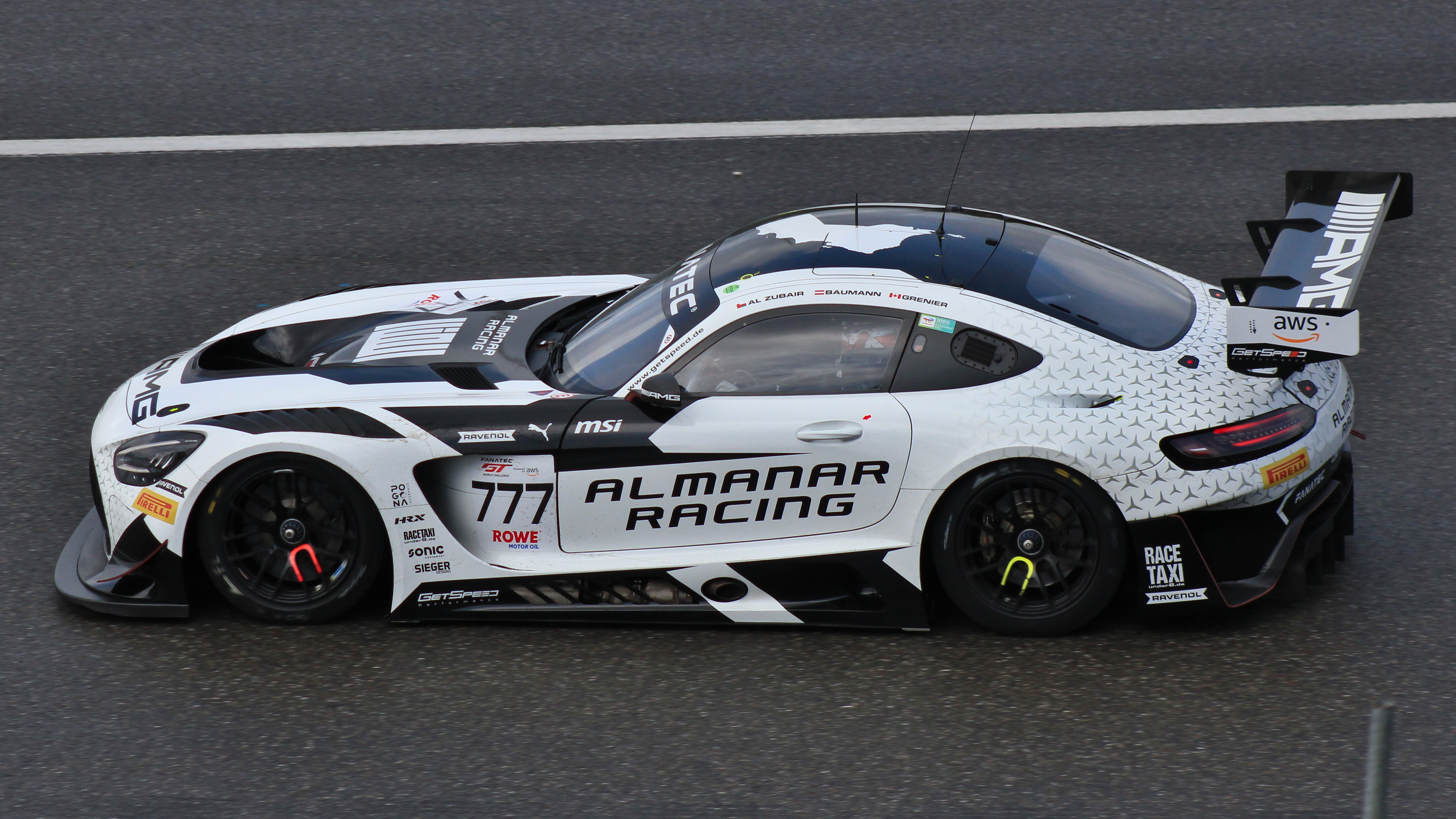
- Grenier in 2024
- Nationality: (Canada) Canadian
- Born: 17 October 1992 (age 34) Stoneham-et-Tewkesbury, Québec, Canada

Deutsche Tourenwagen Masters career
- Debut season: 2022
- Current team: Mercedes-AMG Team GruppeM Racing
- Categorisation: FIA Silver (until 2022); FIA Gold (2023–)
- Car number: 88
- Starts: 14 (16 entries)
- Wins: 0
- Podiums: 0
- Poles: 0
- Fastest laps: 0
- Best finish: 20th in 2022

Mikaël Grenier (born October 17, 1992) is a Canadian racing driver for Mercedes-AMG. He has previously competed in Indy Lights, the IMSA SportsCar Championship, and the Deutsche Tourenwagen Masters.

== Career ==
After karting, Grenier moved to Formula BMW Americas in 2008 with Apex-HBR Racing Team, finishing fourth in points with a pole at Road America and six podium finishes. In 2009, he made six starts in Star Mazda for Andersen Racing, good enough for eighteenth in points. In 2010, he drove the full Star Mazda schedule for Andersen and finished eighth in points, finishing second from the pole at O'Reilly Raceway Park at Indianapolis and winning from the pole in race one at Autobahn Country Club.

In 2011, Grenier made four Firestone Indy Lights starts O2 Racing Technology and one start for Team Moore Racing with a best finish of fifth at Barber Motorsports Park. He finished 16th in points. In 2013, he made a single start with Team Moore at Long Beach. He participated in his first IndyCar Series test with KV Racing Technology in November 2013 at Sebring Raceway.

Grenier returned to racing in 2016 when he signed to drive in the Porsche Carrera Cup Italia with Tsunami Racing. After a third-place finish in his first outing at Monza he consistently made top-five with a few podium finishes. The last race of the season was the turning point of his season with a win at Mugello in damp conditions. This secured fourth place in the driver Championship on his return to racing after a two-year absence.

For the 2023 season, Grenier joined Team Korthoff Motorsports in the IMSA SportsCar Championship, driving in the GTD class alongside Mike Skeen. He was also added to the Mercedes-AMG factory roster for the 2023 season.

== Racing record ==
=== Career summary ===
Season	Series	Team	Races	Wins	Poles	F/Laps	Podiums	Points	Position
2008	Formula BMW Americas	Apex-HBR Racing Team	15	0	1	1	5	126	4th
2008	Formula BMW World Final	Apex-HBR Motorsport USA	1	0	0	0	0	N/A	DNF
2009	Star Mazda Championship	Andersen Racing	6	0	0	0	2	189	18th
2010	Star Mazda Championship	Andersen Racing	12	1	2	0	3	366	8th
2011	Indy Lights	O2 Racing Technology	4	0	0	0	0	121	16th
2011	Indy Lights	Team Moore Racing	1	0	0	0	0	121	16th
2013	Indy Lights	Team Moore Racing	1	0	0	0	0	26	15th
2016	Porsche Carrera Cup Italia	Tsunami Racing Team	16	1	0	0	3	150	4th
2017	Lamborghini Super Trofeo Europe	Antonelli Motorsport	12	6	1	0	9	142	**1st**
2017	International GT Open	Antonelli Motorsport	2	0	0	0	0	0	NC
2017	Blancpain GT Series Endurance Cup	Attempto Racing	1	0	0	0	0	0	NC
2017	Intercontinental GT Challenge	Attempto Racing	1	0	0	0	0	0	NC
2018	Blancpain GT Series Endurance Cup	Emil Frey Jaguar Racing	5	0	0	0	0	22	21st
2018	Blancpain GT Series Sprint Cup	Emil Frey Jaguar Racing	2	0	0	0	0	3	23rd
2018	Intercontinental GT Challenge	SunEnergy1 Racing	2	0	0	0	0	0	NC†
2018	IMSA SportsCar Championship - GTD	SunEnergy1 Racing	3	0	0	0	0	67	32nd
2019	International GT Open	Emil Frey Racing	14	4	1	1	7	116	**2nd**
2019	Intercontinental GT Challenge	SunEnergy1 Racing	1	0	0	0	0	0	NC†
2020	GT World Challenge Europe Endurance Cup	Emil Frey Racing	4	0	0	0	0	0	NC
2020	GT World Challenge Europe Sprint Cup	Emil Frey Racing	10	0	3	3	3	45.5	8th
2020	Intercontinental GT Challenge	SunEnergy1 Racing	1	0	0	0	0	2	20th
2020	Intercontinental GT Challenge	Emil Frey Racing	1	0	0	0	0	2	20th
2021	GT World Challenge Europe Endurance Cup	Winward Motorsport	5	0	0	0	0	6	26th
2021	GT World Challenge America	Winward Racing	6	1	1	2	4	73	6th
2021	Michelin Pilot Challenge	Winward Racing	1	0	0	0	0	170	56th
2021	Intercontinental GT Challenge	Winward Racing	1	0	0	0	0	10	16th
2021	Intercontinental GT Challenge	SunEnergy1 Racing	2	0	0	0	0	10	16th
2021	IMSA SportsCar Championship - GTD	SunEnergy1 Racing	5	0	0	0	1	778	30th
2022	Deutsche Tourenwagen Masters	Mercedes-AMG Team GruppeM Racing	14	0	0	0	0	17	20th
2022	GT World Challenge Europe Endurance Cup	Mercedes-AMG Team GruppeM Racing	1	0	0	0	0	13	23rd
2022	Intercontinental GT Challenge	Mercedes-AMG Team GruppeM Racing							
2022	Asian Le Mans Series - GT	SPS Automotive Performance	4	0	0	0	0	2	15th
2022	IMSA SportsCar Championship - GTD Pro	WeatherTech Racing	2	0	0	0	0	559	18th
2022	IMSA SportsCar Championship - GTD	Winward Racing	1	0	1	0	0	285	54th
2022	24H GT Series - GT3	SunEnergy1 by SPS automotive performance							
2023	IMSA SportsCar Championship - GTD	Team Korthoff Motorsports	9	0	1	1	2	2773	7th
2023	IMSA SportsCar Championship - GTD	Korthoff Preston Motorsports	2	0	0	0	0	2773	7th
2023	GT World Challenge Europe Endurance Cup	Mercedes-AMG Team GruppeM Racing	1	0	0	0	0	7	20th
2023	Intercontinental GT Challenge	Mercedes-AMG Team GruppeM Racing	4	1	3	1	2	46	8th
2023	GT World Challenge Asia - GT3	Triple Eight JMR	4	0	0	0	2	42	17th
2023	24 Hours of Nürburgring - SP-X	Schnitzelalm Racing	1	0	1	1	1	N/A	**2nd**
2024	IMSA SportsCar Championship - GTD	Korthoff/Preston Motorsports	10	1	2	0	3	2661	**3rd**
2024	GT World Challenge Europe Endurance Cup	Al Manar Racing by GetSpeed	4	0	0	0	0	6	26th
2024	International GT Open	Al Manar Racing by GetSpeed	3	2	0	1	2	53	11th
2024	Intercontinental GT Challenge	National Storage Racing	1	0	0	0	0	40	**3rd**
2024	Intercontinental GT Challenge	Mercedes-AMG Team GetSpeed	1	0	0	0	0	40	**3rd**
2024	Intercontinental GT Challenge	Al Manar Racing by GetSpeed	1	0	0	0	1	40	**3rd**
2024	Intercontinental GT Challenge	Mercedes-AMG Team GruppeM Racing	1	0	0	0	1	40	**3rd**
2024	24 Hours of Nürburgring - SP9	Mercedes-AMG Team GetSpeed	1	0	0	0	0	N/A	DNF
2024	GT World Challenge Asia	Triple Eight JMR	2	0	0	?	1	23	26th
2024	GT World Challenge America - Pro	Mercedes-AMG Team GruppeM Racing	1	0	0	0	1	0	NC†
2025	IMSA SportsCar Championship - GTD Pro	75 Express	2	0	0	0	0	402	25th
2025	GT World Challenge America - Pro	JMF Motorsports	13	4	5	2	11	248.5	**2nd**
2025	GT World Challenge Europe Endurance Cup	Boutsen VDS	5	0	0	0	0	1	27th
2025	Intercontinental GT Challenge	Mercedes-AMG Team GMR	2	0	0	0	0	20	20th
2025	Intercontinental GT Challenge	Mercedes-AMG Team GetSpeed	1	0	0	0	0	20	20th
2025	Intercontinental GT Challenge	Boutsen VDS	1	0	0	0	0	20	20th
2025	Intercontinental GT Challenge	JMF Motorsports	1	0	0	0	0	20	20th
2025	Nürburgring Langstrecken-Serie - SP9	Mercedes-AMG Team GetSpeed							
2025-26	24H Series Middle East - GT3	Capital RT by Motopark							
2026	GT World Challenge America - Pro	JMF Motorsports	7	2	3	1	6	144	**2nd**
2026	GT World Challenge Europe Endurance Cup	GetSpeed Team Dubai	4	0	0	0	0	0	NC
2026	Nürburgring Langstrecken-Serie - SP9	PROsport Racing Team Bilstein							
2026	24 Hours of Nürburgring - SP9	PROsport Racing Team Bilstein	1	0	0	0	0	N/A	DNF
2026	24H Series - GT3	GetSpeed Team PCX Racing	1	0	1	1	0	42	26th
2026	24H Series - GT3	Ajith RedAnt Racing	1	0	0	0	0	42	26th
2026	Intercontinental GT Challenge	Mercedes-AMG Team Craft-Bamboo Racing	1	1	0	0	1	37	11th
2026	Intercontinental GT Challenge	PROsport Racing Team Bilstein	1	0	0	0	0	37	11th
2026	Intercontinental GT Challenge	GetSpeed Team Dubai	1	0	0	0	0	37	11th
2026	Intercontinental GT Challenge	75 Express	1	0	0	0	0	37	11th
2026	Intercontinental GT Challenge	JMF Motorsports	1	0	0	0	0	37	11th

† Guest driver ineligible to score points

=== Star Mazda Championship ===
Year	Team	1	2	3	4	5	6	7	8	9	10	11	12	13	Rank	Points
2009	Andersen Racing	SEB	VIR; 8	MMP; 7	NJ1; 3	NJ2; 3	WIS; 12	IOW	ILL	ILL	QUE; 4	ONT	ATL	LAG	**18th**	**189**
2010	Andersen Racing	SEB; 4	STP; 6	LAG; 3	ORP; 2	IOW; 15	NJ1; 5	NJ2; 21	ACC; 1	ACC; 4	TRO; 10	ROA; 16	MOS; 6	ATL	**8th**	**366**

=== Indy Lights ===
Year	Team	1	2	3	4	5	6	7	8	9	10	11	12	13	14	Rank	Points
2011	O2 Racing Technology	STP; 7	ALA; 5	LBH; 7	INDY; 10	MIL	IOW	TOR	EDM1	EDM2						**15th**	**134**
2011	Team Moore Racing										TRO; 11	NHM	BAL	KTY	LVS	**15th**	**134**
2013	Team Moore Racing	STP	ALA	LBH; 7	INDY	MIL	IOW	POC	TOR	MOH	BAL	HOU	FON			**15th**	**26**

=== Complete GT World Challenge Europe results ===
==== GT World Challenge Europe Endurance Cup ====
(Races in bold indicate pole position) (Races in italics indicate fastest lap)

Year	Team	Car	Class	1	2	3	4	5	6	7	Pos.	Points
Blancpain GT Series Endurance Cup
2017	Attempto Racing	Lamborghini Huracán GT3	Pro	MNZ	SIL	LEC	SPA; 6H; 50	SPA; 12H; 39	SPA; 24H; 35	CAT	NC	0
2018	Emil Frey Racing	Jaguar XK Emil Frey GT3	Silver	**MNZ**; 5	**SIL**; 44	**LEC**; 16	SPA; 6H; 29	SPA; 12H; 35	**SPA**; **24H**; 28	CAT; 4	1st	103
GT World Challenge Europe Endurance Cup
2020	Emil Frey Racing	Lamborghini Huracán GT3 Evo	Pro	IMO; 11	NÜR; Ret	SPA; 6H; 39	SPA; 12H; 31	SPA; 24H; 16	LEC; 11		NC	0
2021	Winward Racing	Mercedes-AMG GT3 Evo	Silver	MON; 7	LEC; 20	SPA; 6H; 21	SPA; 12H; Ret	SPA; 24H; Ret	NÜR; 24	CAT; 29	15th	32
2022	AMG Team GruppeM Racing	Mercedes-AMG GT3 Evo	Pro	IMO	LEC	SPA; 6H; 10	SPA; 12H; 9	SPA; 24H; 4	HOC	CAT	23rd	13
2023	Mercedes-AMG Team GruppeM Racing	Mercedes-AMG GT3 Evo	Pro	MNZ	LEC	SPA; 6H; 19	SPA; 12H; 3	SPA; 24H; Ret	NÜR	CAT	20th	7
2024	AlManar Racing by GetSpeed	Mercedes-AMG GT3 Evo	Gold	**LEC**; 15	SPA; 6H; 30	SPA; 12H; 23	SPA; 24H; 7	NÜR; 17	MNZ	JED; 20	2nd	104
2025	Boutsen VDS	Mercedes-AMG GT3 Evo	Pro	LEC; 28	MNZ; Ret	SPA; 6H; 39	SPA; 12H; 65†	SPA; 24H; Ret^{3}	NÜR; 13	CAT; Ret	27th	1
2026	GetSpeed Team Dubai	Mercedes-AMG GT3 Evo	Bronze	LEC; 36	MNZ; 31	SPA; 6H; 23	SPA; 12H; 28	SPA; 24H; 47	NÜR	ALG; 40	22nd	17

* Season still in progress.

==== GT World Challenge Europe Sprint Cup ====
Year	Team	Car	Class	1	2	3	4	5	6	7	8	9	10	Pos	Points
2018	Emil Frey Racing	Jaguar XK Emil Frey G3	Silver	ZOL; 1	ZOL; 2	BRH; 1	BRH; 2	MIS; 1; 7	MIS; 2; 11	HUN; 1	HUN; 2	NÜR; 1	NÜR; 2	11th	21.5
2020	Emil Frey Racing	Lamborghini Huracán GT3 Evo	Pro	MIS; 1; 10	MIS; 2 Ret	MIS; 3; 7	MAG; 1; 2	MAG; 2; 7	**ZAN**; **1**; 16	**ZAN**; **2**; 10				8th	45.5
2020	Emil Frey Racing	Lamborghini Huracán GT3 Evo	Silver								**CAT**; **1**; 2	CAT; 2; 8	CAT; 3; 3	8th	43.5

=== Complete IMSA SportsCar Championship results ===
(key) (Races in bold indicate pole position; results in italics indicate fastest lap)

Year	Team	Class	Make	Engine	1	2	3	4	5	6	7	8	9	10	11	12	Pos.	Points
2018	SunEnergy1 Racing	GTD	Mercedes-AMG GT3	Mercedes-AMG M159 6.2 L V8	DAY; 8	SEB; 10	MOH	DET	WGL; 8	MOS	LRP	ROA	VIR	LAG	PET		32nd	67
2021	SunEnergy1 Racing	GTD	Mercedes-AMG GT3 Evo	Mercedes-AMG M159 6.2 L V8	DAY; 2	SEB; 9	MOH	DET; 10	WGL; 14	WGL	LIM	ELK	LGA	LBH	VIR	PET	30th	778
2022	Winward Racing	GTD	Mercedes-AMG GT3 Evo	Mercedes-AMG M159 6.2 L V8	**DAY**; 6	SEB	LBH	LGA	MOH	DET							54th	285
2022	WeatherTech Racing	GTD Pro	Mercedes-AMG GT3 Evo	Mercedes-AMG M159 6.2 L V8							WGL; 5	MOS	LIM	ELK	VIR	PET; 6	18th	559
2023	Team Korthoff Motorsports	GTD	Mercedes-AMG GT3 Evo	Mercedes-AMG M159 6.2 L V8	DAY; 15	SEB; 10	LBH; 4	MON; 15	WGL; 12	MOS; 3	**LIM**; 10	ELK; 3	VIR; 11	IMS; 9	PET; 6		7th	2773
2024	Korthoff/Preston Motorsports	GTD	Mercedes-AMG GT3 Evo	Mercedes-AMG M159 6.2 L V8	DAY; 5	SEB; 21	LBH; 3	LGA; 4	WGL; 11	MOS; 8	**ELK**; 7	VIR; 1	**IMS**; 3	PET; 19			3rd	2661
2025	75 Express	GTD Pro	Mercedes-AMG GT3 Evo	Mercedes-AMG M159 6.2 L V8	DAY; 15	SEB	LGA	DET	WGL	MOS	ELK	VIR	IMS; 11	PET			25th	402

=== Complete Deutsche Tourenwagen Masters results ===
(key) (Races in bold indicate pole position) (Races in italics indicate fastest lap)

Year	Entrant	Chassis	1	2	3	4	5	6	7	8	9	10	11	12	13	14	15	16	Rank	Points
2022	Mercedes-AMG Team GruppeM Racing	Mercedes-AMG GT3 Evo	ALG; 1; 15^{2}	ALG; 2 Ret	LAU; 1 Ret	LAU; 2 Ret	IMO; 1; 19	IMO; 2; 15	NOR; 1; 9	NOR; 2 Ret	NÜR; 1; 10	NÜR; 2; 8	SPA; 1 Ret	SPA; 2; 6	RBR; 1 Ret	RBR; 2 DNS	HOC; 1 Ret	HOC; 2 DNS	20th	17

Sporting positions
Preceded by Inaugural	Blancpain GT Series Endurance Cup; Silver Cup Champion; 2018; With: Alex Fontana & Adrian Zaugg	Succeeded by Nico Bastian; Timur Boguslavskiy; Felipe Fraga
