= Utah Motorsports Campus =

Motorsport venue in the United States

West Desert
- Full Course (2006–present)

- Outer Course (2006–present)
- Location: 512 Sheep Lane; Grantsville, Utah
- Coordinates: 40°34′30″N 112°22′29″W
- Capacity: 8,000 Grandstand Seats + Trackside Seating
- Owner: PV3 Investments LLC (February 2026–present); Mitime Investment and Development Group (Subsidiary of Geely) (November 2015–January 2026); Larry H. Miller (April 2006–October 2015)
- Broke ground: 26 April 2005; 21 years ago
- Opened: 1 April 2006; 20 years ago
- Construction cost: US$100 million
- Architect: Alan Wilson
- Former names: Utah Motorsports Campus (November 2015–February 2025, February 2026–August 2026); Burt Brothers Motopark (March 2025–January 2026); Miller Motorsports Park (April 2006–October 2015)
- Major events: Future: MotoAmerica (2006–2008, 2011–2013, 2015–2019, 2027) Former: Formula D (2022–2025); Porsche Sprint Challenge North America USA West (2022–2025); ARCA Menards Series West ENEOS/Sunrise Ford Twin 30 (2007–2014, 2016, 2020); American Le Mans Series Utah Grand Prix (2006–2010); World SBK (2008–2012); Rolex Sports Car Series (2006–2010); Pirelli World Challenge (2006–2008, 2010–2012, 2014–2018); Trans-Am Series (2010–2011)
- Website: www.westdesert.com

Full Course (2006–present)
- Surface: Asphalt
- Length: 4.486 mi (7.220 km)
- Turns: 23
- Race lap record: 2:18.128 ( (Germany) Timo Bernhard, Porsche RS Spyder Evo, 2007, LMP2)

Outer Course (2006–present)
- Surface: Asphalt
- Length: 3.048 mi (4.905 km)
- Turns: 14
- Race lap record: 1:32.815 ( (France) Simon Pagenaud, Acura ARX-02a, 2009, LMP1)

East Course (2006–present)
- Surface: Asphalt
- Length: 2.199 mi (3.539 km)
- Turns: 15
- Race lap record: 1:29.565 ( (Brazil) Giancarlo Vilarinho, Mygale FB02, 2009, Formula BMW)

West Course (2006–present)
- Surface: Asphalt
- Length: 2.19 mi (3.52 km)
- Turns: 10

The Utah Motorsports Campus, officially known as West Desert, is a racetrack facility located in Grantsville near Tooele, Utah, United States. It operated under the name of Burt Brothers Motorpark from between March 2025 and January 2026. It has also previously operated under the name Miller Motorsports Park from April 2006 until October 2015 and the name of Utah Motorsports Campus between November 2015 and March 2025. The course has hosted auto, motorcycle, bicycle and kart racing, along with corporate events.

Along with the famed, 20.832 km (12.944 mi) long Nürburgring Nordschleife in Germany, the 7.770 km (4.828 mi) The Bend Motorsport Park in Australia and the 7.004 km (4.352 mi) Circuit de Spa-Francorchamps in Belgium, Utah Motorsports Campus is one of only four permanent motor racing circuits in the world with an official minimum length of at least 7.000 km (4.350 mi).

== Track ==
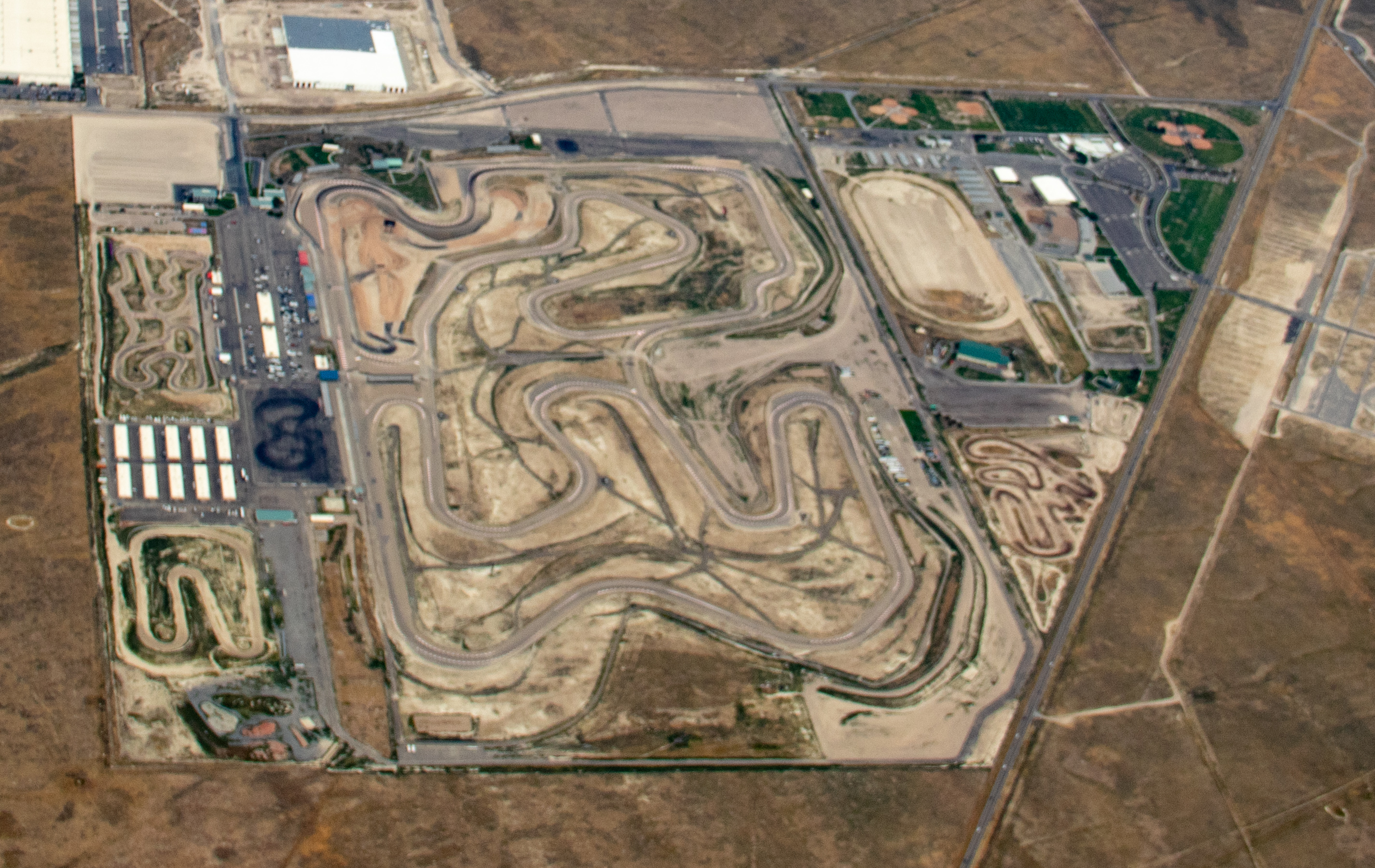
Aerial view of the circuit

During the annual Tour of Utah bicycle race, the park was known for hosting the tour's "trademark" time-trial stage.

== History ==
The facility was named Motorsports Facility of the Year on November 8, 2006, by the Professional Motorsport World Expo in Cologne, Germany.

On August 22, 2007, Miller Motorsports Park announced a three-year deal to bring the FIM Superbike World Championship to the track; the Superbike World Championship would race at the track for the first time on June 1, 2008, with the AMA Superbike Championship. To avoid direct comparisons between World Superbike and AMA Superbike, and because of sponsorship issues, the two championships raced on different configurations of the circuit. World Superbike used the Outercourse, while AMA Superbike and its support classes used the Full course.

The American Le Mans Series and Rolex Sports Car Series did not return to the Utah Grand Prix for 2011, and a K&N Pro Series West race was substituted. It was also announced that AMA Superbike Championship would return to the track in 2011 with Superbike World Championship.

The off-road racetrack hosted a round of the Lucas Oil Off Road Racing Series from 2010 to 2018. A return was scheduled for 2020 prior to its cancellation due to the COVID-19 pandemic. The inaugural Nitro Rallycross round took place at the track in September 2021.

=== Lease and ownership ===
It was announced on May 8, 2015, that the Larry H. Miller Group of Companies would not renew the lease on the land in Tooele County, Utah on which the park sits. The last day of operation would be October 31, 2015.

According to local news sources, as of July 17, 2015, there were several offers being considered by the Tooele County commissioners that would provide for the facility to continue operation.

On October 13, 2015, Tooele County voted to approve the sale of Miller Motorsports Park to Mitime Investment and Development Group (a subsidiary of Chinese car manufacturer Geely) for $20 million. The facility was subsequently renamed as Utah Motorsports Campus. Mitime officially took over the property on October 31, 2015.

On December 17, 2015, an order filed in the 3rd District Court vacated the sale of Miller Motorsports Park to Mitime Investment and Development Group, saying Tooele County shortchanged another bidder by unlawfully selling the property at a price significantly below fair market value.

On February 1, 2016, Mitime took over the management of the facility on behalf of Tooele County. This was a temporary agreement for 2016 while the county went through the process of selling the facility. In May 2016, there were pending legal challenges to the sale, but the facility opened for business as the Utah Motorsports Campus. In November 2018, the sale to Mitime was completed.

Burt Brothers Tire bought naming rights, which became effective in March 2025.

A state law passed in 2024 prohibits firms that are owned or controlled by the governments of China, Iran, North Korea, and Russia from owning real estate in Utah. Utah found that Mitime had prohibited links to the Chinese government. The state quickly ordered Mitime to divest from the track. PV3 Investments LLC purchased it in 2026 under UMC Holdings LLC.

== Layout configurations ==
West Desert circuit layout configurations
Full Course (2006–present)

Outer Course (2006–present)

East Course (2006–present)

West Course (2006–present)

== Events ==
Current

- September: World Racing League Western Championship Finale

Future

- MotoAmerica (2006–2008, 2011–2013, 2015–2019, 2027)

Former

- AMA Superbike Championship (2006–2008, 2011–2013)
- American Le Mans Series
  - Utah Grand Prix (2006–2010)
- ARCA Menards Series West
  - ENEOS/Sunrise Ford Twin 30 (2007–2014, 2016, 2020)
- Atlantic Championship (2008–2009)
- ChampCar Endurance Series (2018–2019)
- Continental Tire Sports Car Challenge (2006–2010)
- Ferrari Challenge North America (2009–2010)
- Formula BMW Americas (2007, 2009)
- Formula D (2022–2025)
- IMSA GT3 Cup Challenge (2006–2012)
- IMSA Prototype Lites (2007–2010, 2012)
- Lucas Oil Off Road Racing Series (2010–2018)
- Mazda MX-5 Cup (2006–2010)
- NASA Championships (2024)
- Nitro World Games (2018–2019)
- Nitrocross (2018–2021, 2023–2024)
- Pirelli World Challenge (2006–2008, 2010–2012, 2014–2018)
- Porsche Sprint Challenge North America USA West (2022–2025)
- Rolex Sports Car Series (2006–2010)
- Superbike World Championship (2008–2012)
- Supersport World Championship (2008–2012)
- Star Mazda Championship (2006–2009)
- Trans-Am Series (2010–2011)
- Trans-Am West Coast Championship (2021–2022)

== Lap records ==
As of May 2024, the fastest official race lap records on the West Desert (formerly Utah Motorsports Campus, Burt Brothers Motorpark and Miller Motorsports Park) are listed as:

Category	Time	Driver	Vehicle	Event
Full Course (2006–present): 4.486 mi (7.220 km)
LMP2	2:21.749	Timo Bernhard	Porsche RS Spyder Evo	2007 Utah Grand Prix
LMP1	2:22.919	Allan McNish	Audi R10 TDI	2007 Utah Grand Prix
Formula Atlantic	2:29.564	Carl Skerlong	Swift 016.a	2008 Utah Formula Atlantic round
GT1 (GTS)	2:36.650	Stéphane Sarrazin	Aston Martin DBR9	2006 Utah Grand Prix
DP	2:37.323	Raphael Matos	Riley Mk XX	2008 Porsche 250 Presented by Bradley Arant
GT2	2:44.403	Jaime Melo	Ferrari F430 GTC	2006 Utah Grand Prix
Superbike	2:46.083	Ben Spies	Suzuki GSX-R1000	2008 Utah AMA Superbike round
Supersport	2:50.043	Josh Hayes	Honda CBR600RR	2008 Utah AMA Formula Xtreme round
Porsche Carrera Cup	2:56.982	Bryce Miller	Porsche 911 (997) GT3 Cup	2006 Utah IMSA GT3 Cup Challenge round
Outer Course (2006–present): 3.048 mi (4.905 km)
LMP1	1:32.815	Simon Pagenaud	Acura ARX-02a	2009 Utah Grand Prix
LMP2	1:32.816	Simon Pagenaud	Acura ARX-01b	2008 Utah Grand Prix
Formula Atlantic	1:38.553	Simona de Silvestro	Swift 016.a	2009 Utah Formula Atlantic round
GT1 (GTS)	1:43.434	Jan Magnussen	Chevrolet Corvette C6.R	2008 Utah Grand Prix
LMPC	1:43.881	Gunnar Jeannette	Oreca FLM09	2010 Utah Grand Prix
DP	1:43.908	Scott Pruett	Riley Mk XX	2010 Utah 250
Star Mazda	1:44.471	John Edwards	Star Formula Mazda 'Pro'	2008 Utah Star Mazda round
World SBK	1:48.045	Carlos Checa	Ducati 1098R	2010 Utah World SBK round
GT2	1:48.305	Patrick Pilet	Porsche 911 (997) GT3-RSR	2008 Utah Grand Prix
Superbike	1:49.200	Cameron Beaubier	Yamaha YZF-R1	2018 Utah MotoAmerica Superbike round
GT3	1:49.409	Álvaro Parente	Bentley Continental GT3	2018 Utah Pirelli World Challenge round
Trans-Am	1:50.084	Tony Ave	Chevrolet Corvette C6 Trans-Am	2011 Utah Trans-Am round
World SSP	1:51.702	Kenan Sofuoğlu	Honda CBR600RR	2010 Utah World SSP round
Porsche Carrera Cup	1:52.087	Blake McDonald	Porsche 911 (992 I) GT3 Cup	2024 Utah Porsche Sprint Challenge North America USA West round
Supersport	1:52.264	J. D. Beach	Yamaha YZF-R6	2017 Utah MotoAmerica Supersport round
TA2	1:56.172	Brody Goble	Ford Mustang Trans-Am	2022 Utah Trans-Am West Coast round
GT4	1:58.977	George Kurtz	Audi R8 LMS GT4	2018 Utah Pirelli World Challenge round
TCR Touring Car	1:59.212	Michael James Lewis	Hyundai i30 N TCR	2018 Utah Pirelli World Challenge round
Twins Cup	2:03.134	Chris Parrish	Suzuki GSX-8R	2018 Utah MotoAmerica Twins round
Supersport 300	2:10.845	Alex Dumas	KTM RC 390 R	2018 Utah MotoAmerica Junior Cup round
East Course (2006–present): 2.199 mi (3.539 km)
Formula BMW	1:29.565	Giancarlo Vilarinho	Mygale FB02	2009 Utah Formula BMW Americas round
Superbike	1:30.355	Garrett Gerloff	Yamaha YZF-R1	2019 Utah MotoAmerica Superbike round
Trans-Am	1:30.465	Mike Skeen	Chevrolet Corvette C6 Trans-Am	2010 Utah Trans-Am round
Supersport	1:32.256	Hayden Gillim	Yamaha YZF-R6	2019 Utah MotoAmerica Supersport round
Twins Cup	1:36.827	Alex Dumas	Suzuki GSX-8R	2019 Utah MotoAmerica Twins round
Supersport 300	1:40.788	Dallas Daniels	Kawasaki Ninja 400R	2019 Utah MotoAmerica Junior Cup round
