= Lumbard =

Lumbard is a surname. Notable people with the surname include:

- J. Edward Lumbard (1901–1999), American judge
- Joseph E. B. Lumbard (born 1969), American author and professor
- Nicholas Lumbard (died after 1364), Irish barrister and judge

== See also ==
- Lombard (surname)
