= Olivier Lombard =

French racing driver

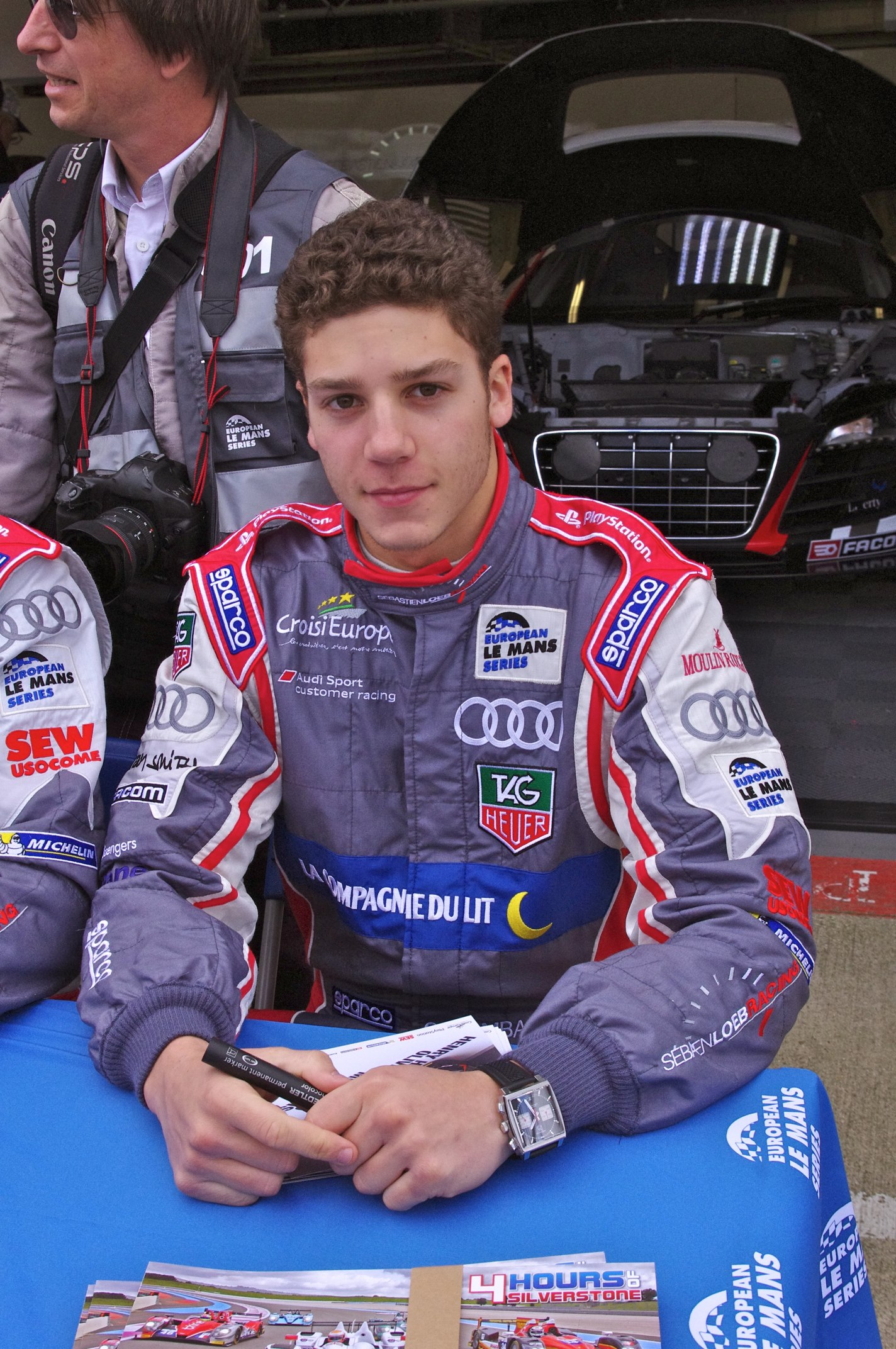
- Lombard in 2014
- Nationality: (France) French
- Born: 25 April 1991 (age 35) Poissy, France

FIA World Endurance Championship career
- Categorisation: FIA Gold (until 2012); FIA Silver (2013–)
- Years active: 2012
- Former teams: Signatech-Nissan
- Starts: 8
- Wins: 0
- Poles: 0

Previous series
- 2011 2010-2011 2009 2009: American Le Mans Series; Le Mans Series; Formula BMW America; Formula BMW Europe
24 Hours of Le Mans career
- Years: 2011
- Teams: Greaves Motorsport
- Best finish: 8th (2011)
- Class wins: 1 (2011)

Olivier Lombard (born 25 April 1991 in Poissy) is a French racing driver. He raced in the 2012 season of the FIA World Endurance Championship for Signatech-Nissan.

== Career ==
After karting from 2004 to 2008, Lombard began racing cars in 2009 when he contested the Formula BMW Europe series. Driving for the EuroInternational team, he finished 16th overall and fourth best rookie, with a best result of fifth at the final race of the season at Monza. He also contested two rounds of the 2009 Formula BMW Americas season with EuroInternational, at Virginia and Road America.

In 2010, Lombard switched to sportscars, contesting the final three rounds of the Le Mans Series in the Formula Le Mans category with Hope Polevision Racing. After the car failed to finish at his first race, he finished third in the FLM class at the Hungaroring and second at Silverstone.

After contesting the 2011 12 Hours of Sebring and 1000 km of Spa in the FLM car, Lombard signed with Greaves Motorsport to contest the 24 Hours of Le Mans and the remainder of the Le Mans Series with the team in its LMP2 class Zytek-Nissan. Olivier Lombard and Greaves went on to win the LMP2 class at Le Mans, finishing eighth overall. They also won the Le Mans Series rounds at Imola and Silverstone, helping Greaves to win the LMP2 title.

Lombard contested the 2012 FIA World Endurance Championship season for Signatech-Nissan in LMP2, together with fellow French drivers Franck Mailleux and Jordan Tresson.

== 24 Hours of Le Mans results ==
Year	Team	Co-Drivers	Car	Class	Laps	Pos.	Class Pos.
2011	(United Kingdom) Greaves Motorsport	(Saudi Arabia) Karim Ojjeh (United Kingdom) Tom Kimber-Smith	Zytek Z11SN-Nissan	LMP2	326	8th	1st
2012	(France) Signatech-Nissan	(France) Jordan Tresson (France) Franck Mailleux	Oreca 03-Nissan	LMP2	340	16th	9th
2013	(Switzerland) Morand Racing	(Switzerland) Natacha Gachnang (France) Franck Mailleux	Morgan LMP2-Judd	LMP2	320	11th	5th
