= 2019 MotoAmerica Junior Cup =

Sports competition

The 2019 MotoAmerica Junior Cup season the 5th season of Junior Cup since the series was renamed to MotoAmerica. Alex Dumas was the defending champion, after taking maiden Junior Cup title during the 2018 season aboard a KTM.

== Calendar and results ==
Round	Circuit	Date	Race 1 Winner	Race 2 Winner
1	(Georgia (U.S. state)) Road Atlanta	April 5–7	(United States) Rocco Landers	(United States) Rocco Landers
	(Texas) Circuit of the Americas	April 12–14	(No Event)	(No Event)
2	Virginia International Raceway	May 3–5	(United States) Rocco Landers	(United States) Cameron Jones
3	(Wisconsin) Road America	May 31-June 2	(United States) Rocco Landers	(United States) Rocco Landers
4	Utah Motorsports Campus	June 14–16	(United States) Rocco Landers	(United States) Dallas Daniels
5	(California) Laguna Seca	July 12–14	(United States) Rocco Landers	(No Event)
6	(California) Sonoma Raceway	August 9–11	(United States) Rocco Landers	(United States) Rocco Landers
7	(Pennsylvania) Pittsburgh International Race Complex	August 23–25	(El Salvador) Kevin Olmedo	(United States) Rocco Landers
8	New Jersey Motorsports Park	September 6–8	(United States) Rocco Landers	(United States) Rocco Landers
9	(Alabama) Barber Motorsports Park	September 20–22	(United States) Rocco Landers	(No Event)

== Teams and riders ==
2020 Entry List
Team	Constructor	No.	Rider	Rounds
AGVSport Monkey-Moto	Kawasaki	31	(Brazil) Renzo Ferreira	4
Altus Motorsports	Kawasaki	14	(El Salvador) Kevin Olmedo	All
BARTCON Racing	Kawasaki	25	(South Africa) Dominic Doyle	All
BARTCON Racing	Kawasaki	78	(United States) Damian Jigalov	All
BRB Racing	Yamaha	43	(United States) Brady Fors	3
Burleson Racing	Kawasaki	91	(United States) Isaiah Burleson	1–4, 6–9
Calishine Racing	Kawasaki	55	(United States) Aden Thao	6
Catalyst Reaction	Kawasaki	28	(United States) Nikolas Thompson	4, 6
Celtic HSBK Racing	Yamaha	57	(South Africa) Samuel Lochoff	1–4
Celtic HSBK Racing	Yamaha	69	(United States) Dallas Daniels	1–4, 5, 7
DMK Racing	Kawasaki	99	(United States) David Kohlstaedt	6, 9
Dominic Doyle Racing	Kawasaki	25	(South Africa) Dominic Doyle	All
Feel Like A Pro/Riderzlaw Racing	Kawasaki	26	(United States) Marc Edwards	3, 4, 6
Finishline Machine Racing	Yamaha	18	(United States) Jackson Blackmon	All
Floyd's of Leadville	Kawasaki	21	(United States) Josh Serne	5, 6
Grant Motors Racing	Kawasaki	94	(United States) Liam Grant	4, 6, 9
Help Work México Racing Team	Kawasaki	32	(Mexico) Daniel Cano Flores	2, 3, 9
Hunter Dunham Racing	Kawasaki	17	(United States) Hunter Dunham	1–7
Hunter Dunham Racing	Kawasaki	65	(United States) Eziah Davis	8
JL62 Racing	Kawasaki	62	(United States) Joseph LiMandri Jr	2, 9
Jones Powersports/MCU Innovations	Kawasaki	11	(United States) Cameron Jones	1–4, 7, 9
Landers Racing	Kawasaki	97	(United States) Rocco Landers	All
MonkeyMoto/AGV Sport	Kawasaki	26	(United States) Marc Edwards	3, 4, 6
MonkeyMoto/AGV Sport/Blud Lubricants	Yamaha	18	(United States) Jackson Blackmon	All
Moonshot Motorsports	Kawasaki	52	(United States) John Knowles	1–4, 6, 7, 9
Moto Cave/3 Lions Racing	Kawasaki	29	(Canada) Grayson Davidson	1–4, 6–9
NCR Development	Yamaha	12	(United States) Brett Voorhees	4, 6
Pure Attitude Racing	Kawasaki	16	(United States) Trevor Standish	1–3, 7–9
Quarterley Racing/On Track Development	Kawasaki	39	(New Zealand) Jacob Stroud	6–9
Quarterley Racing/On Track Development	Kawasaki	49	(United States) Jamie Astudillo	All
Quarterley Racing/On Track Development	Kawasaki	69	(United States) Dallas Daniels	1–5, 7
Quarterley Racing/On Track Development	Kawasaki	72	(United States) Benjamin Gloddy	4–9
Quarterley Racing/On Track Development	Kawasaki	78	(United States) Damian Jigalov	All
Quarterley Racing/On Track Development	Kawasaki	79	(United States) Teagg Hobbs	All
Raceshop/Westby Racing/KWR	Yamaha	34	(United States) Cody Wyman	7–9
Revelo Racing Team	Kawasaki	93	(El Salvador) Rafael Revelo	5, 6
Rickdiculous Racing	Kawasaki	46	(United States) Gauge Rees	All
Rodio Racing	Kawasaki	96	(United States) Gus Rodio	1–3, 7–9
Team Adler Racing	Kawasaki	44	(United States) Brenden Ketelsen	1–6
Toby K Racing	Kawasaki	27	(Laos) Toby Khamsouk	1–4, 6–9
Veloce Racing	Yamaha	35	(Japan) Karen Ogura	4–6, 9
Westby Racing	Yamaha	57	(South Africa) Samuel Lochoff	1–4

== Championship standings ==
=== Riders' championship ===
Scoring system

Points are awarded to the top fifteen finishers. A rider has to finish the race to earn points.

Position	1st	2nd	3rd	4th	5th	6th	7th	8th	9th	10th	11th	12th	13th	14th	15th
Points	25	20	16	13	11	10	9	8	7	6	5	4	3	2	1

Pos	Rider	Bike	RAT (Georgia (U.S. state))		VIR (Virginia)		RAM (Wisconsin)		UMC (Utah)		MON (California)	SON (California)		PIT (Pennsylvania)		NJE (New Jersey)		BAR (Alabama)	Pts
Pos	Rider	Bike	R1	R2	R1	R2	R1	R2	R1	R2	R1	R1	R2	R1	R2	R1	R2	R1	Pts
1	(United States) Rocco Landers	Kawasaki	1	1	1	11	1	1	1	2	1	1	1	Ret	1	1	1	1	350
2	(El Salvador) Kevin Olmedo	Kawasaki	6	DSQ	3	13	3	2	3	3	3	2	2	1	2	Ret	3	Ret	214
3	(United States) Dallas Daniels	Yamaha	2	2	2	4	2	3	2	1	2			3	6				200
4	(United States) Jackson Blackmon	Yamaha	11	6	5	2	9	Ret	17	15	7	10	6	6	3	2	5	3	152
5	(South Africa) Dominic Doyle	Kawasaki	5	3	Ret	9	5	5	11	6	6	Ret	Ret	2	14	12	4	2	140
6	(United States) Gauge Rees	Kawasaki	8	4	6	7	7	10	5	10	8	7	7	5	7	Ret	8	6	136
7	(United States) Damian Jigalov	Kawasaki	7	5	Ret	6	4	4	14	11	13	17	10	Ret	4	6	2	5	126
8	(United States) Teagg Hobbs	Kawasaki	4	Ret	12	8	12	12	20	20	12	9	12	9	11	8	7	12	81
9	(United States) Hunter Dunham	Kawasaki	12	10	Ret	Ret	14	11	8	13	10	6	5	7	5				75
10	(Laos) Toby Khamsouk	Kawasaki	10	7	8	Ret	Ret	Ret	7	9		11	9	Ret	8	7	13	15	72
11	(United States) Isaiah Burleson	Kawasaki	Ret	8	17	10	10	6	4	8		14	Ret	12	10	Ret	9	Ret	70
12	(United States) Benjamin Gloddy	Kawasaki							12	5	11	8	Ret	8	9	10	11	4	67
13	(United States) Marc Edwards	Kawasaki					11	13	6	4		3	3						63
14	(South Africa) Samuel Lochoff	Yamaha	3	Ret	4	Ret	8	7	9	7									62
15	(United States) Brenden Ketelsen	Kawasaki	9	Ret	10	Ret	6	Ret	15	14	9	5	4						57
16	(United States) Trevor Standish	Kawasaki	14	12	11	3	13	14						11	12	11	15	16	47
17	(New Zealand) Jacob Stroud	Kawasaki										19	8	4	Ret	5	10	9	45
18	(United States) Cameron Jones	Kawasaki	15	11	14	1	16	15	22	21				15	16			13	38
19	(United States) Gus Rodio	Kawasaki	13	15	9	Ret	15	9						13	13	9	Ret	Ret	32
20	(Japan) Karen Ogura	Yamaha							10	12	5	15	14					8	32
21	(United States) Eziah Davis	Kawasaki														3	6		26
22	(United States) Josh Serne	Kawasaki									4	4	DSQ						26
23	(United States) Cody Wyman	Yamaha												Ret	Ret	4	12	10	23
24	(United States) Jamie Astudillo	Kawasaki	DNS	9	13	Ret	18	Ret	19	19	15	22	16	10	18	13	14	18	22
25	(United States) Joseph LiMandri Jr	Kawasaki			7	5												17	20
26	(United States) John Knowles	Kawasaki	16	13	16	12	20	16	21	18		13	DSQ	14	17			14	14
27	(El Salvador) Rafael Revelo	Kawasaki									14	12	11						11
28	(United States) Liam Grant	Kawasaki							16	16		18	15					7	10
29	(Mexico) Daniel Cano Flores	Kawasaki			DSQ	Ret	17	8										Ret	8
30	(United States) David Kohlstaedt	Kawasaki										23	13					11	8
31	(Canada) Grayson Davidson	Kawasaki	17	14	15	Ret	Ret	Ret	DNS			24	18	16	15	14	16	19	6
32	(Brazil) Renzo Ferreira	Kawasaki							13	DNS									3
33	(United States) Nikolas Thompson	Kawasaki							18	17		16	DSQ						0
34	(United States) Brett Voorhees	Yamaha							23			21	17						0
35	(United States) Brady Fors	Yamaha					19	17											0
36	(United States) Aden Thao	Kawasaki										20							0
Pos	Rider	Bike	RAT (Georgia (U.S. state))		VIR (Virginia)		RAM (Wisconsin)		UMC (Utah)		MON (California)	SON (California)		PIT (Pennsylvania)		NJE (New Jersey)		BAR (Alabama)	Pts
