= Alex Ellis (racing driver) =

Canadian racing driver

Alexander Ellis (born September 25, 1991) is a Canadian racing driver from St. Catharines, Ontario.

Ellis began racing in 2005 in go-karts at the age of fourteen. After a successful foray into karting, Ellis participated in a 1.2L Formula Vee series in Canada in 2008 and won the rookie championship, finishing second overall despite missing the final three races of the season due to driving commitments in Europe. At the end of 2008, Ellis won the prestigious Formula BMW Junior Scholarship - a multi-weekend shootout between international drivers, held in Valencia, Spain. This paved the way for 2009 where he drove as a BMW Junior Driver and moved to Formula BMW Americas driving for Autotecnica. As a rookie, Ellis finished sixth in points with a best finish of second at Road America. Additionally, he scored three podiums, three fastest laps, and captured a pole at Lime Rock Park in the wet. Ellis' racing continued to be funded in 2010 by winning another driver shootout, this time in San Francisco, California. He went on to win the Jim Russell "Race of Champions" title, winning a chance to make his Firestone Indy Lights debut on August 22 at Infineon Raceway driving for Sam Schmidt Motorsports. Racing at the highest level of his career, he impressed as a rookie, running the majority of the race in seventh before retiring due to mechanical failure.

== Indy Lights ==
| Year | Team | 1 | 2 | 3 | 4 | 5 | 6 | 7 | 8 | 9 | 10 | 11 | 12 | 13 | Rank | Points | Ref |
|---|---|---|---|---|---|---|---|---|---|---|---|---|---|---|---|---|---|
| 2010 | Sam Schmidt Motorsports | STP | ALA | LBH | INDY | IOW | WGL | TOR | EDM | MOH | SNM; 14 | CHI | KTY | HMS | 33rd | 16 | |
