= Henri-Édouard Lombard =

French sculptor

- Born: 21 November 1855; Marseille, France
- Died: 23 July 1929 (aged 73); Paris, France
- Education: École des Beaux-Arts
- Occupation: Sculptor

Henri-Édouard Lombard (21 November 1855 - 23 July 1929) was a French sculptor. He won the Prix de Rome in 1883. He was a professor of sculpture at the École des Beaux-Arts from 1900 to 1929. He designed public sculptures in Marseille, Nice and Paris.

== Early life ==
Henri-Édouard Lombard was born on 21 November 1855 in Marseille. He graduated from the École des Beaux-Arts.

== Career ==
Lombard began exhibiting his work at the Salon of 1878. He designed a statue of Pierre Puget on the Place de la Bourse, now known as the Place du Général-de-Gaulle, in Marseille in 1906. It was subsequently moved to Cours Pierre Puget. He designed several statues in the Saint-Pierre Cemetery and a frontispiece called La Provence rurale et maritime on the building of the Caisse d'Épargne in Marseille. He also designed a statue called Nice se donne à la France for the Palais des ducs de Savoie in Nice, Samson et Dalila in Agen, and another statue called La Vérité on the facade of the Palace of Justice of Paris.

Lombard won the Prix de Rome for Mort de Diagoras de Rhodes in 1883. He became a Knight of the Legion of Honour in 1894. He was a professor of sculpture at his alma mater, the École des Beaux-Arts, from 1900 to 1929, where he taught evening classes.

== Death ==
Lombard died on 23 July 1929 in Paris.

== Gallery ==
Sculptures by Henri-Édouard Lombard
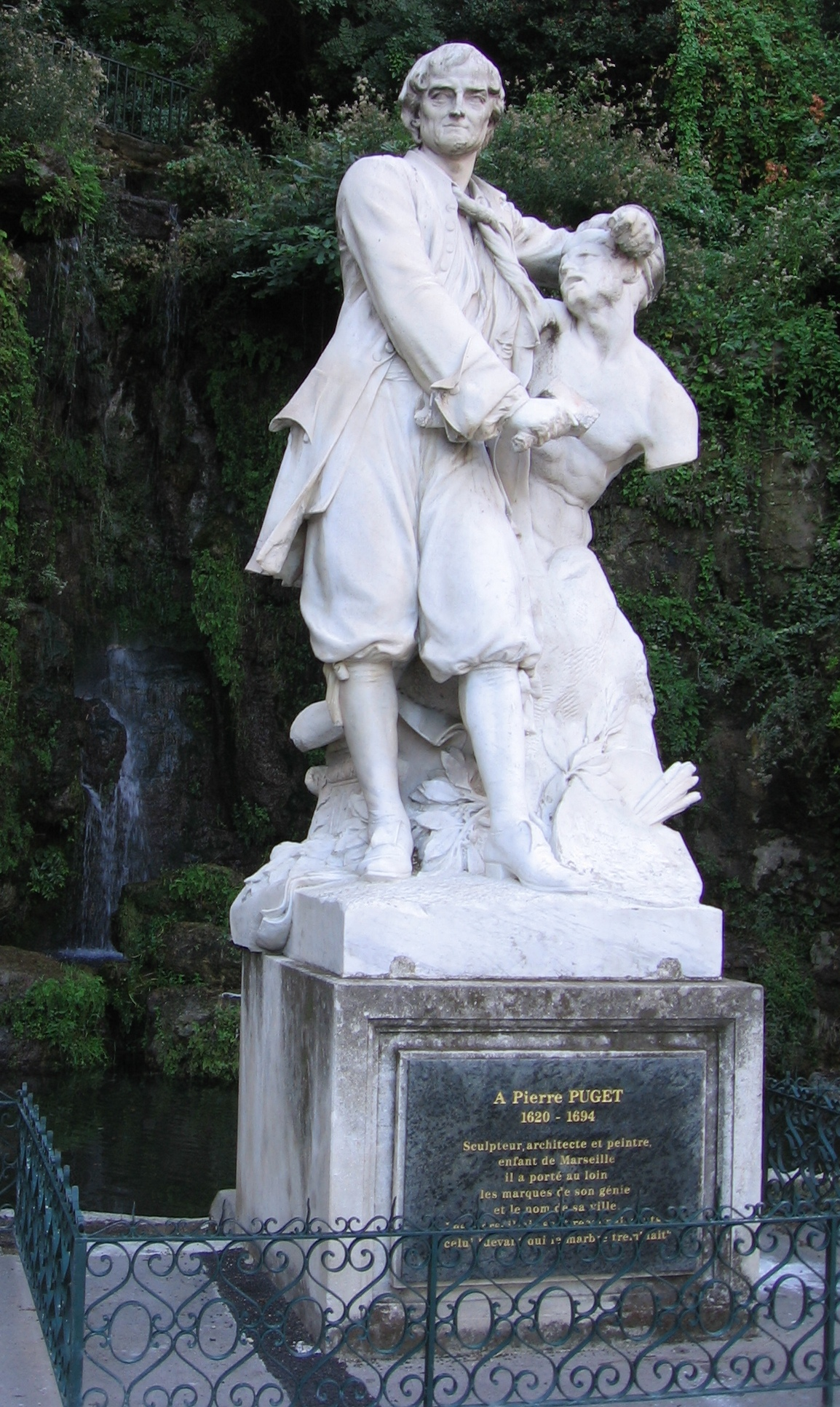
Sculpture of Pierre Puget, Cours Pierre-Puget, Marseille

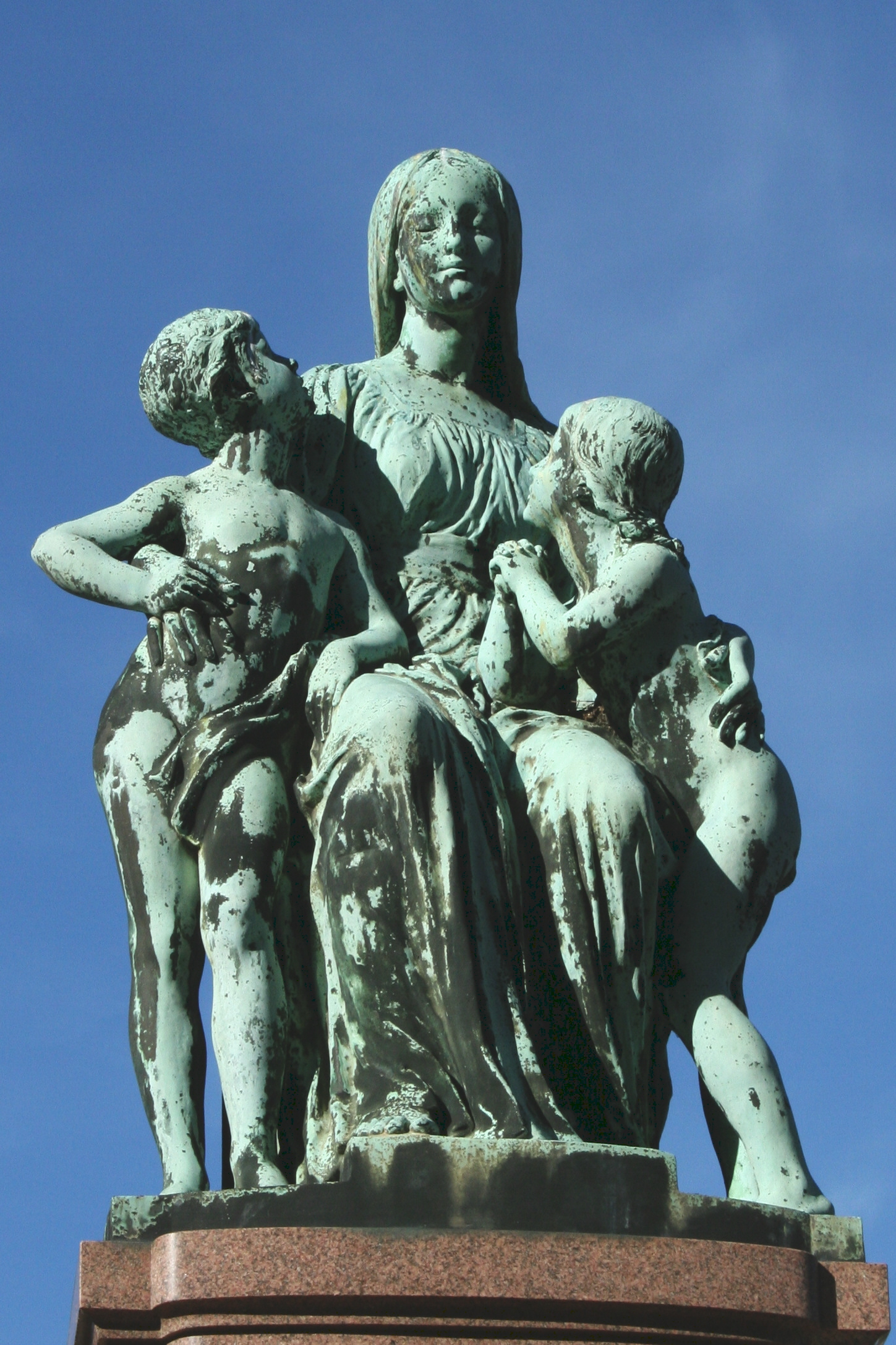
Sculpture in the Saint-Pierre Cemetery, Marseille

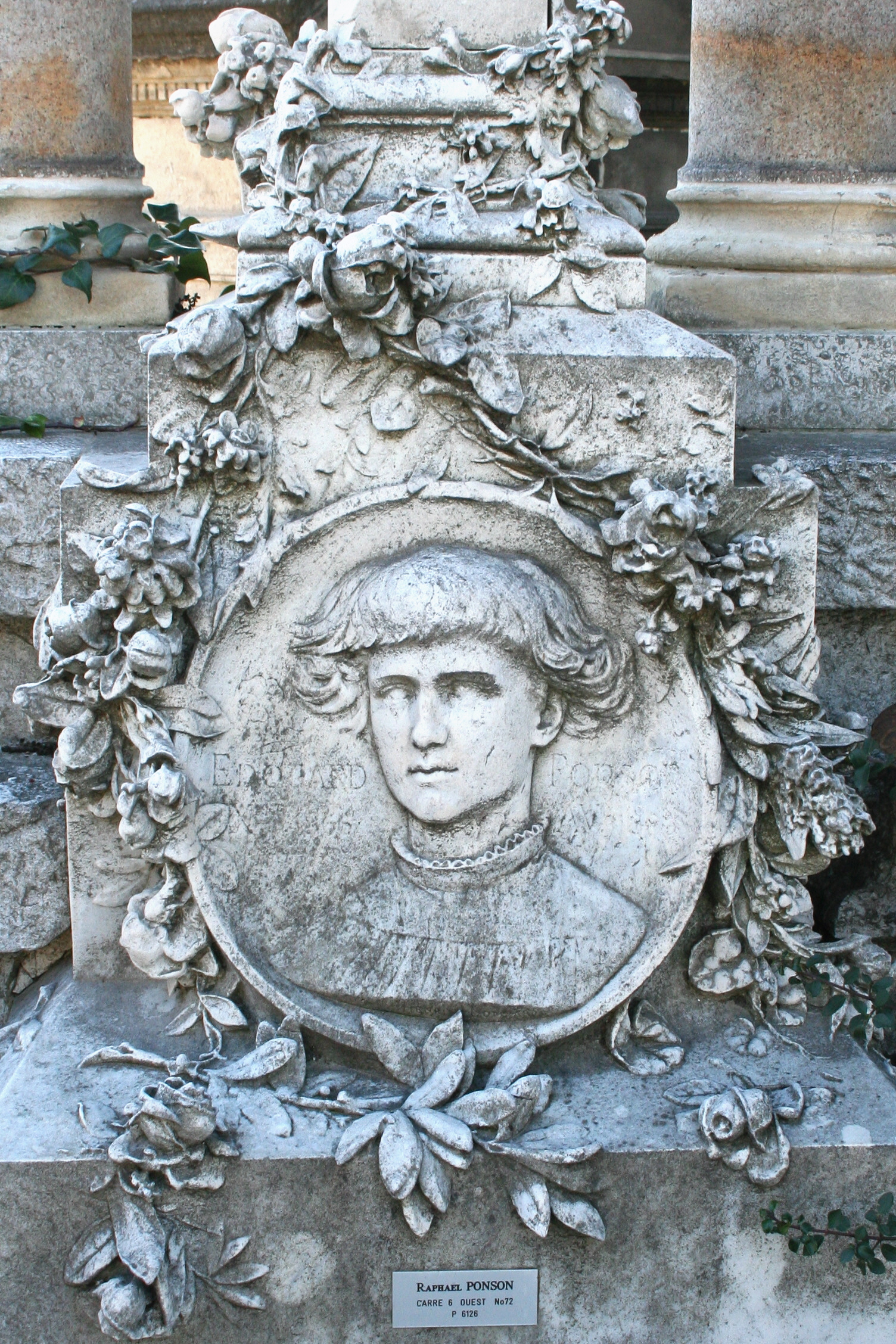
Sculpture of Raphaël Ponson in the Saint-Pierre Cemetery, Marseille

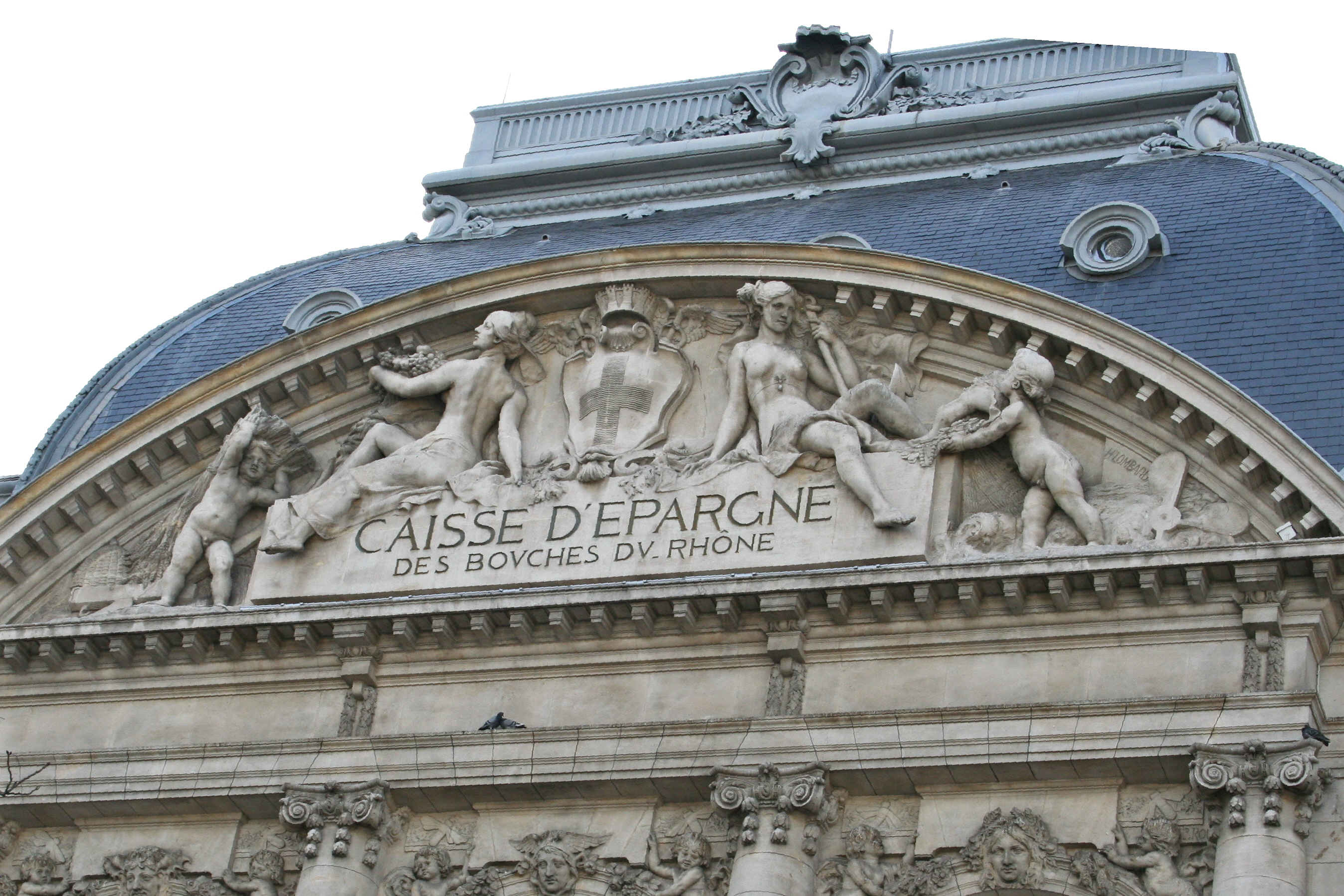
Frontispiece on the Caisse d'Épargne building, Marseille

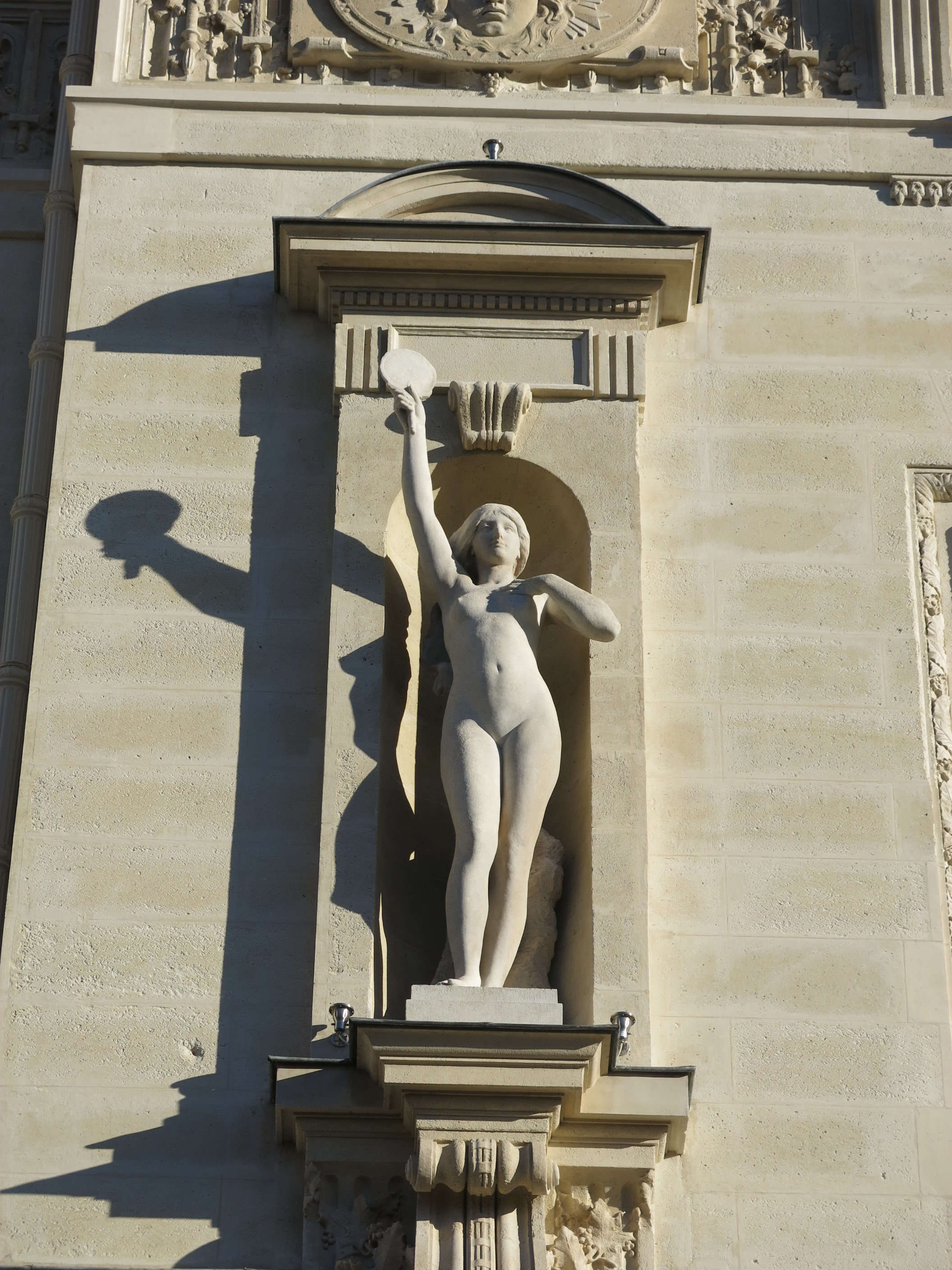
Statue on the Palace of Justice, Paris

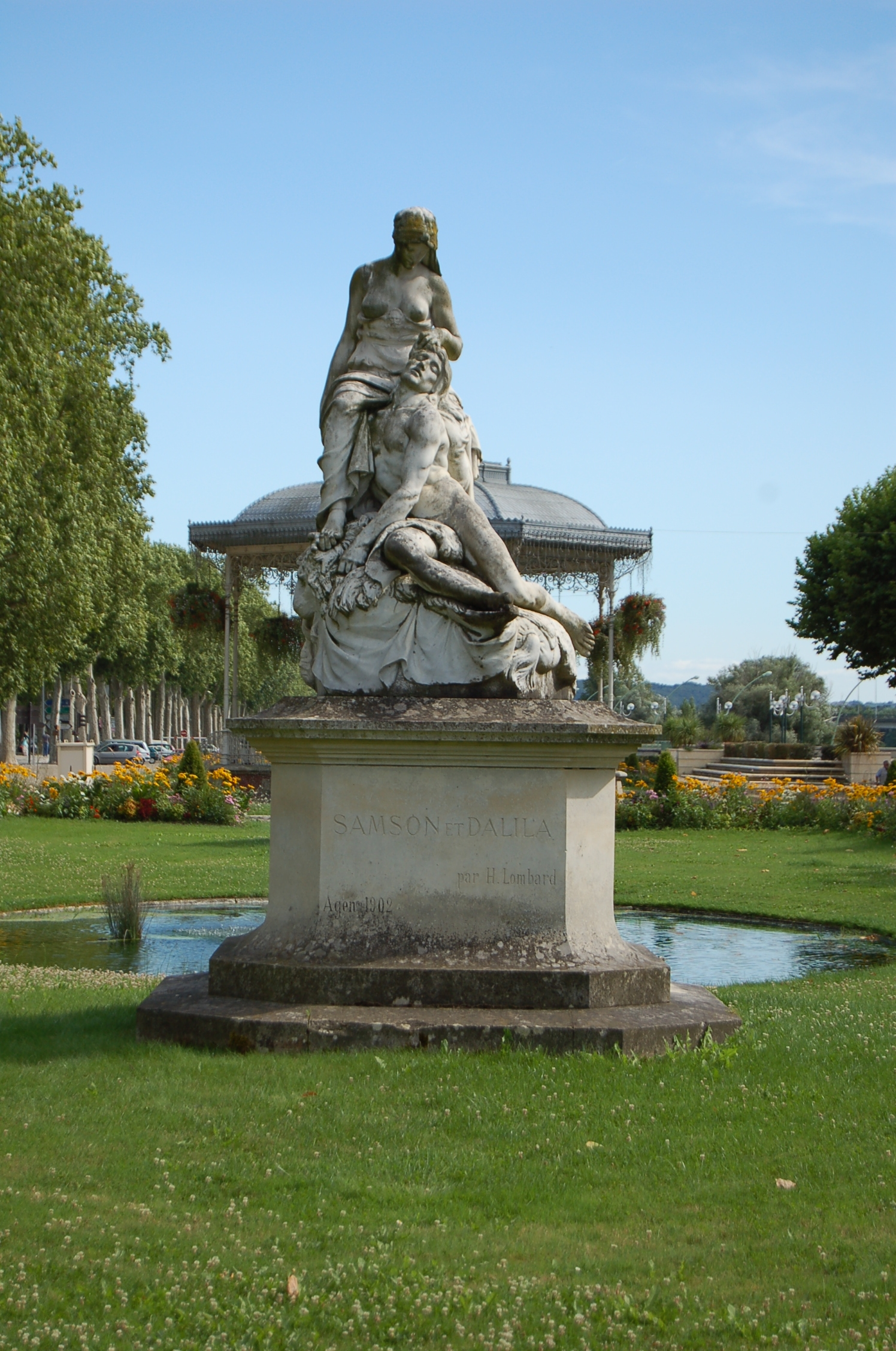
Statue of Samson and Dalila in Agen

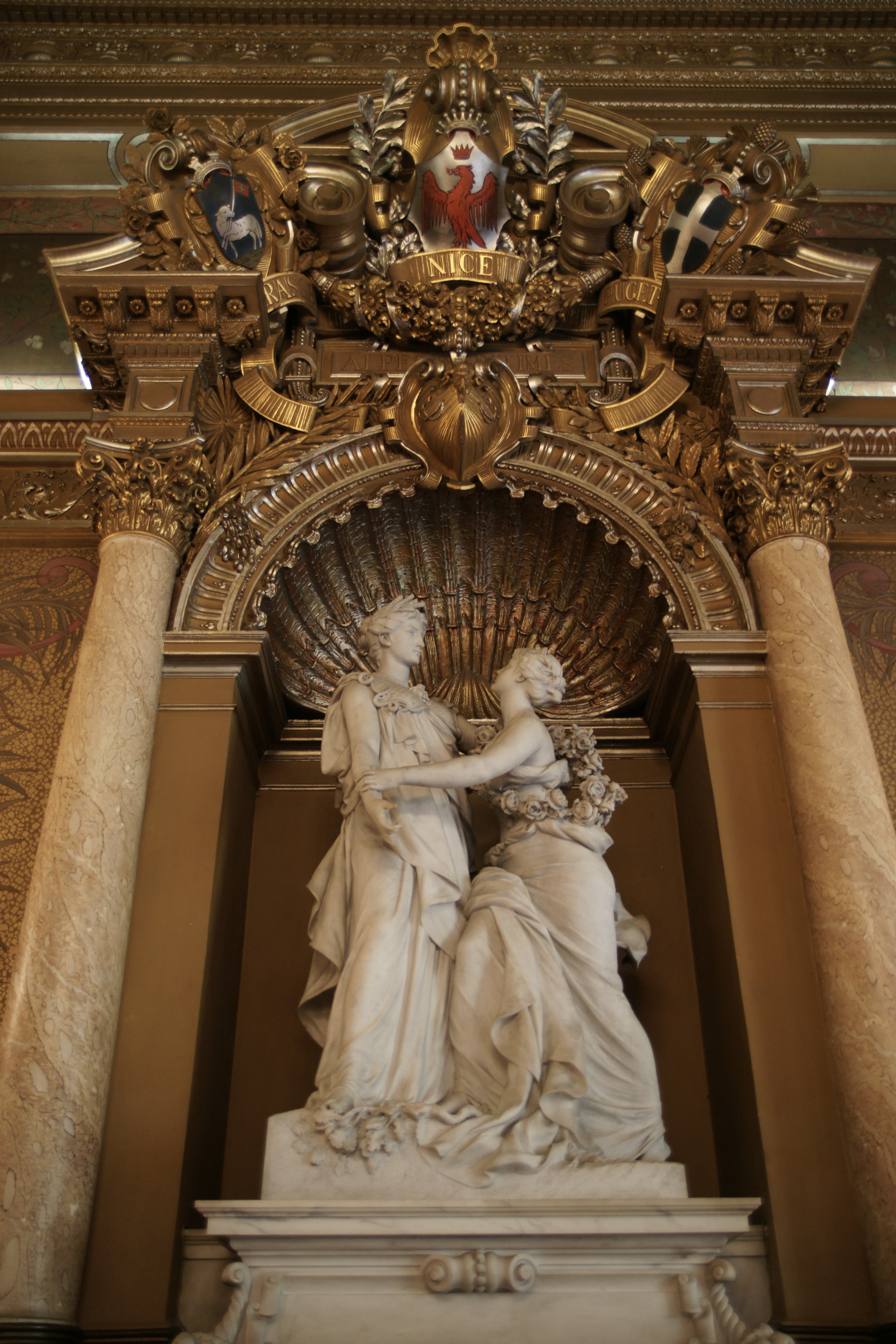
Statue in the Palais des ducs de Savoie, Nice

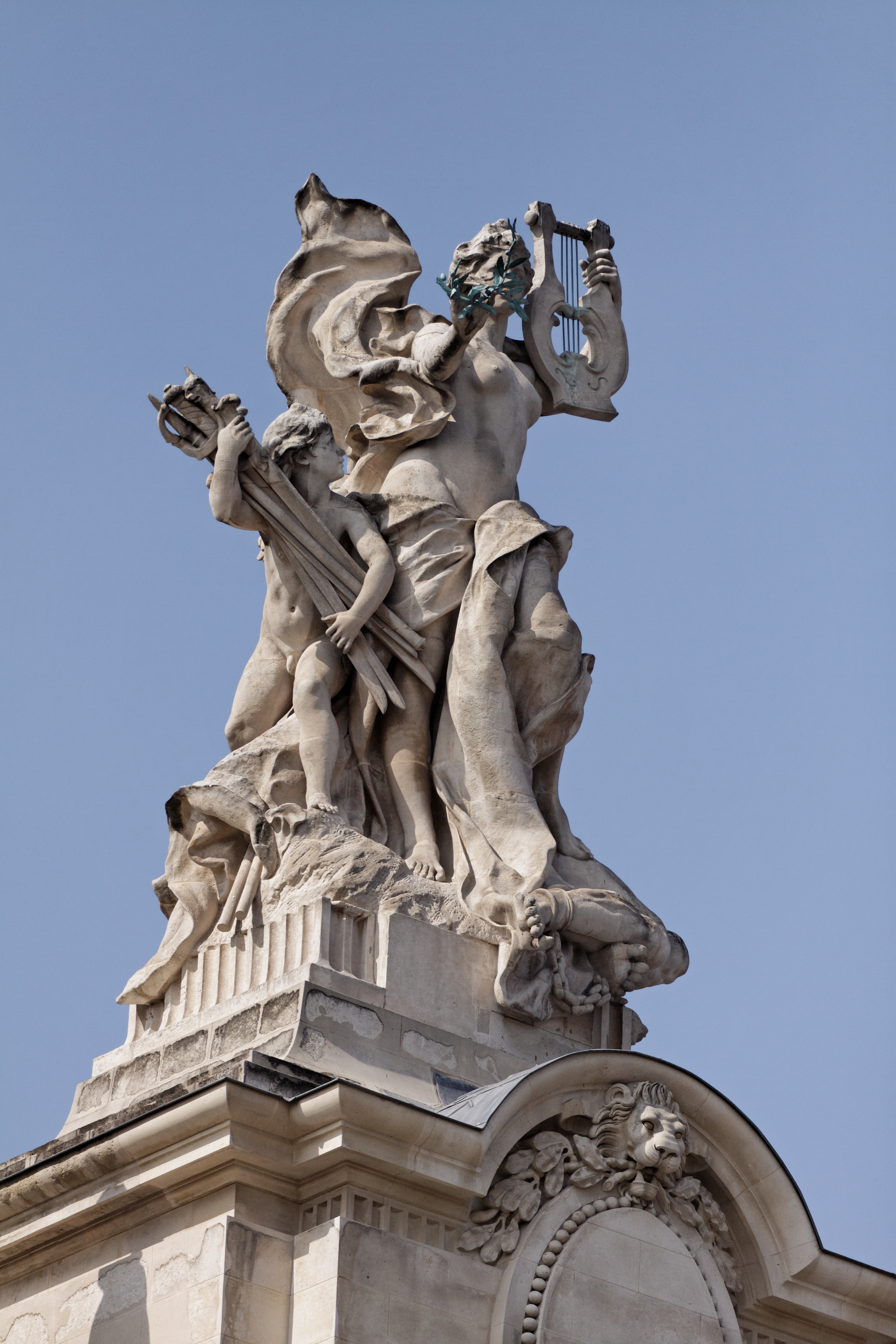
Statue in Grand Palais, Paris
