= Émile Lombard (biblical scholar) =

Émile Lombard (1875-1963) was a French-Swiss biblical scholar.

His best known work was a study of glossolalia (1910). He was controversially removed from his position as Professor of the New Testament at the University of Lausanne after having supported a traditionally religious student.
