= Émile Lombard (painter) =

French painter

Émile-Félicien Lombard (1883 - ?) was a French painter.
