= Giancarlo Vilarinho =

Brazilian racecar driver from São Paulo (born 1992)

Giancarlo Vilarinho (born April 2, 1992) is a Brazilian former racing driver from São Paulo.

After karting, Vilarinho raced in Formula BMW Americas and Formula BMW Europe for the Eurointernational team in 2008, finishing sixth in the Americas series and also competed in the World Finals. In 2009, he returned to Eurointernational and Formula BMW Americas and finished second to his teammate Gabby Chaves, capturing seven wins in the process. He also participated in one Star Mazda race for AIM Autosport. With Formula BMW Americas canceled for 2010, Vilarinho sat out much of the season until signing on with Andersen Racing to make his Firestone Indy Lights debut at the Mid-Ohio Sports Car Course. Vilarinho finished thirteenth at Mid-Ohio and tenth in the race at Infineon Raceway later that month. Those were his final professional auto racing appearances.

== American open-wheel racing results ==
(key)

=== Indy Lights ===
Year	Team	1	2	3	4	5	6	7	8	9	10	11	12	13	Rank	Points	Ref
2010	Andersen Racing	STP	ALA	LBH	INDY	IOW	WGL	TOR	EDM	MOH; 13	SNM; 10	CHI	KTY	HMS	27th	37	
