= Gianmarco Raimondo =

Canadian racing driver (born 1990)

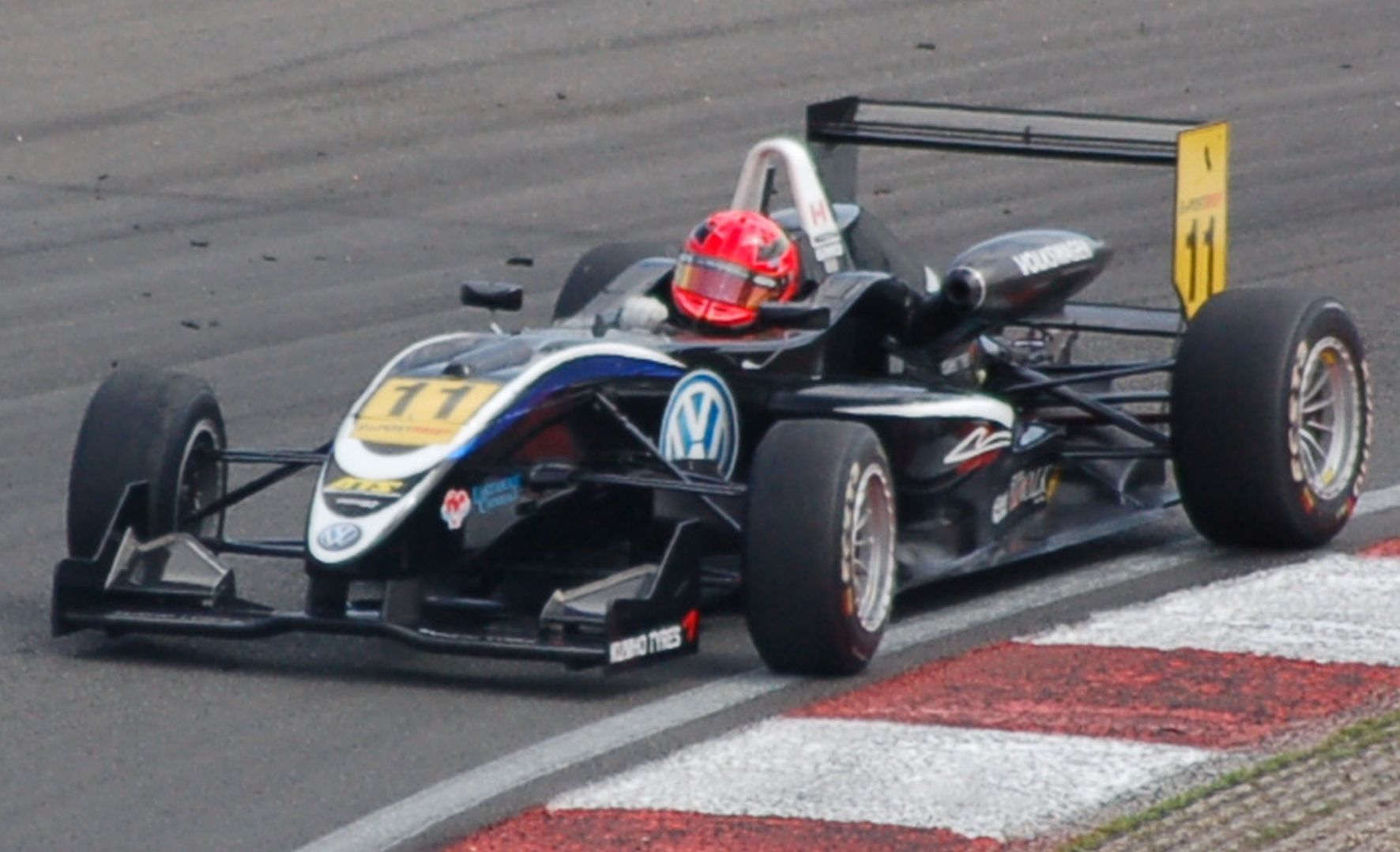
- Born: November 28, 1990 (age 35); St. Catharines, Ontario
- Car number: 11
- Former teams: Prema Powerteam

Previous series
- Formula 3 Euro Series

Gianmarco Raimondo (born November 28, 1990, in St. Catharines, Ontario) is a Canadian racing driver. In 2011, he competed in Formula 3 Euro Series.

== Racing record ==
=== Complete Formula 3 Euro Series results ===
(key)

Year	Entrant	Chassis	Engine	1	2	3	4	5	6	7	8	9	10	11	12	13	14	15	16	17	18	19	20	21	22	23	24	25	26	27	DC	Points
2011	Motopark Academy	Dallara F308/006	Volkswagen	LEC; 1; 9	LEC; 2; 10	LEC; 3; 10	HOC; 1 Ret	HOC; 2; 13	HOC; 3; 14	ZAN; 1; 8	ZAN; 2; 2	ZAN; 3; 11																			11th	66
2011	Prema Powerteam	Dallara F308/006	Mercedes										RBR; 1; 8	RBR; 2; 7	RBR; 3; 8	NOR; 1 Ret	NOR; 2; 6	NOR; 3 Ret	NÜR; 1; 7	NÜR; 2; 9	NÜR; 3; 9	SIL; 1; 12	SIL; 2; 8	SIL; 3 Ret	VAL; 1; 7	VAL; 2; 4	VAL; 3; 8	HOC; 1; 13	HOC; 2; 13	HOC; 3; 8	11th	66

=== Complete GP2 Series results ===
(key) (Races in bold indicate pole position) (Races in italics indicate fastest lap)

Year	Entrant	1	2	3	4	5	6	7	8	9	10	11	12	13	14	15	16	17	18	19	20	21	22	DC	Points
2013	Trident Racing	SEP; FEA	SEP; SPR	BHR; FEA	BHR; SPR	CAT; FEA	CAT; SPR	MON; FEA	MON; SPR	SIL; FEA	SIL; SPR	NÜR; FEA	NÜR; SPR	HUN; FEA	HUN; SPR	SPA; FEA	SPA; SPR	MNZ; FEA	MNZ; SPR	MRN; FEA; 21	MRN; SPR; 22	YMC; FEA; 17	YMC; SPR; 15	30th	0
