= Formula BMW =

Single-seater racing championship

Motor racing formula
- Category: Single seaters
- Country or region: International
- Championships: Europe; Americas; Pacific; Former: Asia; Germany; United Kingdom; United States
- Inaugural season: 1998
- Status: Defunct
- Folded: 2013
- Current champions: (Sweden) Robin Hansson (Talent Cup)

Formula BMW was a junior racing formula for single seater cars. It was positioned at the bottom of the motorsport career ladder alongside the longer established Formula Ford category. Like Formula Ford, it was intended to function as the young kart racing graduate's first experience of car racing.

The new formula was created by BMW Motorsport in 2001, with the first of its championships being inaugurated in Germany in 2002. Selected competitors from each series meet in the World Final at the end of each season, with the promise of a Formula One test for the winner.

From 2011 onwards BMW ceased to support the Pacific and Europe series, in favour of the Formula BMW Talent Cup. The Talent Cup, which was the final Formula BMW championship in existence, ended after the 2013 season.

== Origins ==
BMW has prior experience of junior formula racing, as a successful engine supplier in Formula Two and, more briefly, Formula Three in the 1970s. Its European F2 Championship program, which ran from 1973 to 1981, contributed to six drivers' titles in partnership with March. The company ended its participation prior to its first entry into Formula One in the 1980s.

BMW returned to the junior categories in Germany in 1991, as the engine supplier to the Formula ADAC championship. The first champion was Christian Abt. It was in 2001 that BMW decided to significantly increase its involvement in the series; ADAC remained the sanctioning body, but BMW Motorsport devised the package of regulations and commissioned the new chassis. The new formula made its debut at Hockenheim in April 2002.

Among the series' more notable teams was Team Rosberg, founded by former Formula One world champion Keke Rosberg, which entered the original Formula BMW ADAC in 1999 and continued into the all-new championship. The team took Rosberg's son, Nico, to the 2002 championship title in his rookie year. By 2006, Nico Rosberg had progressed to Formula One.

Formula BMW then expanded to encompass four championships across three continents. The German series was followed by a south-east Asian championship in 2003, and series in the United Kingdom and the United States were launched the following year. The UK and German championships merged into a new pan-European series in 2008.

== Overview ==
Competitors benefited from BMW Motorsport's Education and Coaching Program, which is based at two Formula BMW Racing Centres at the Circuit de Valencia in Spain and the Bahrain International Circuit at Sakhir, Bahrain. The centres provided courses in race driving, chassis setup, fitness and nutrition, media management, and sponsorship searching.

To be eligible to compete in Formula BMW, drivers had to be at least fifteen years old, and must not have competed in any international racing series other than karting. They must have held an International racing license no higher than Grade C. (FIA International racing licenses are graded from A to D, with an additional super-license above Grade A.) Competitors must take part in a Licensing Course at one of the Racing Centres.

BMW also provided an annual scholarship for five young drivers in each championship, between the ages of fifteen and eighteen, who were chosen through a selection process. It provides each driver with a budget of £35,000 in the UK, US$50,000 in Asia, and US$40,000 in the USA.

The best drivers from each championship were invited to the Formula BMW World Final, which takes place at one of the Formula BMW Racing Centres in December of each year. The 2006 event was held at Valencia. It was composed of a series of elimination heats followed by a final race. The winner was awarded a Formula One test with BMW-Sauber.

== Technical information ==
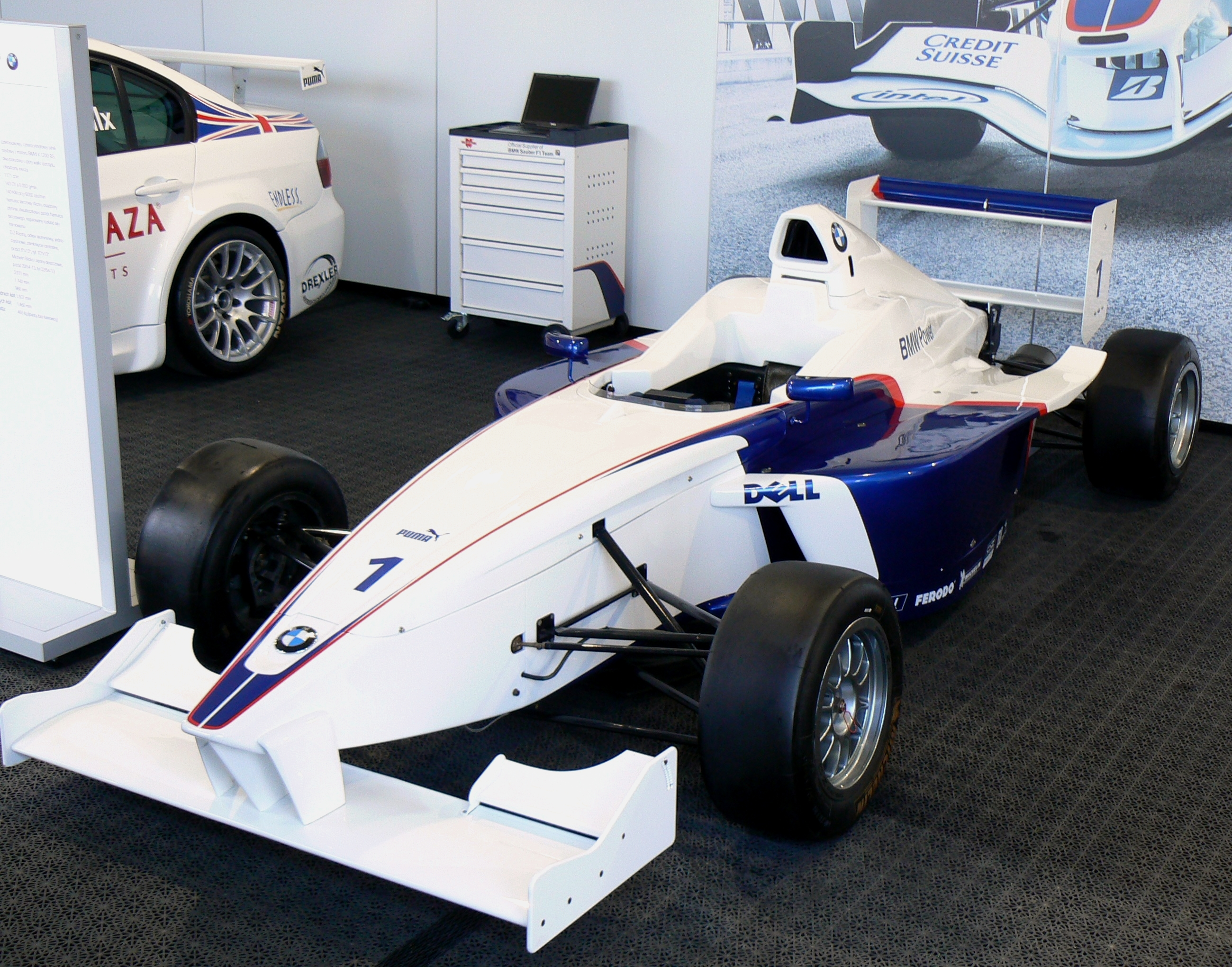
The Formula BMW FB02, built by Mygale

Formula BMW was what is sometimes referred to as a "slicks and wings" formula, which describes the use of slick tires and downforce-generating wings at the front and rear. The addition of wings results in cornering speeds that are faster than those achieved by the wingless Formula Ford cars and comparable to Formula Renault, and provides drivers with valuable first-time experience of the unique characteristics of aerodynamic downforce.

Formula BMW was strictly a "control" formula. This term describes a formula in which every major aspect of equipment and suppliers is restricted. Control formulae normally have only one chassis specification, one engine, and single suppliers of tires and fuel. Modifications to the chassis, bodywork and engine are not permitted and this is strictly enforced through scrutineering. In the case of Formula BMW, tuning is restricted to basic adjustment of the gear ratios, suspension, brake balance, and wing angles. The engines are sealed to prevent illegal modifications and are serviced by Schnitzer Motorsport.

DesignworksUSA, a subsidiary of BMW, led the design of the car in cooperation with the French chassis constructor Mygale, which was responsible for production. The result, designated "FB02", was a compact design, with a carbon-fibre composite tub constructed to the safety standards of the Fédération Internationale de l'Automobile (motorsport's world governing body). The bodywork is made from a kevlar composite. At 3.975 m (13.041 ft) in length, it was larger than a Formula Ford 1600, and slightly smaller than a Formula Renault 2000.

The engine was sourced from BMW's motorcycle division: it is a near-standard K1200RS motorcycle engine, in an inline four-cylinder configuration, with a capacity of 1171 cc, and a power output of 140 hp (100 kW). Drive is through a single-plate clutch and a six-speed sequential gearbox, produced by Hewland. The complete car weighs 455 kg without fuel and driver.

== Sporting regulations ==
As part of the effort to tightly control costs, Formula BMW follows the lead set by most junior single seater formulae by strictly limiting testing. During the season, teams and drivers are primarily limited to a small number of official test days, the cost of which is reimbursed by the series organisers. The teams are allowed to test at circuits that do not host championship events, provided they do not use a driver that competes in the championship. On-board data-loggers are used to monitor each team's on-track activity between race weekends, and illegal running is likely to incur a fine or suspension.

Each chassis is subject to safety inspections by the scrutineers, and may be replaced only if it is deemed necessary due to irreparable accident damage. If this occurs after a qualifying session, that driver's times have to be annulled and the driver must start at the back of the grid. Spare cars (second cars for use in the event of a problem with the first car) are not permitted. At the end of each session or race, the cars have to be submitted to the scrutineers under Parc fermé conditions.

The use of treaded rain tires in place of the normal slick tires is permitted only when the race director deems it necessary in any given session or race, and he reserves the right to mandate their use when conditions are severe. For safety reasons, the pitlane is subject to a 60-km/h (37.5-mph) speed limit, violation of which will result in a drive-through penalty. Drivers must wear FIA-specification helmets and use the Head And Neck Support (HANS) restraint system.

Each race begins with a formation lap behind the safety car, prior to the start itself. During this lap, the drivers must maintain position and not perform dangerous actions such as brake-testing, excessive weaving, and practice starts.

== Event schedule ==
Each weekend begins with a 40-minute free practice session, except at events that support a Formula One Grand Prix, where the schedule is subject to change. Each race is preceded by a 20-minute qualifying session, in which competitors must set a time within 130% of the fastest time in order to qualify for the race. The time set in the qualifying session determines the driver's starting position for the race. If only one qualifying session can take place, each driver's second best time will determine his grid position for the second race. If no qualifying sessions can take place, the current championship standings will decide the grid for both races.

Each race must cover a minimum distance of 60 km (37.5 mi), with that figure determining the number of laps according to the length of the circuit. If the race duration exceeds 30 minutes, it will be stopped at the end of that lap. In the event of a race being stopped prematurely, full points are awarded if the race leader completed at least 75% of the distance, while half points are awarded if at least 50% is completed. If a race is stopped prior to half-distance, it will be restarted where possible. Full points are awarded as follows:

Position	1st	2nd	3rd	4th	5th	6th	7th	8th	9th	10th
Points	20	15	12	10	8	6	4	3	2	1

The UK championship is composed of ten rounds, with two races per round. The German championship previously ran for ten rounds, but was reduced to nine in 2006. The US championship has only seven rounds, each with two races. The Asian championship is a little different: it used to run seven rounds with two races per weekend, but now has six rounds with four races per weekend at all bar one round. Having fewer events, but with more races at each, helps to reduce transport and travel costs without reducing the number of races.

== Championships ==
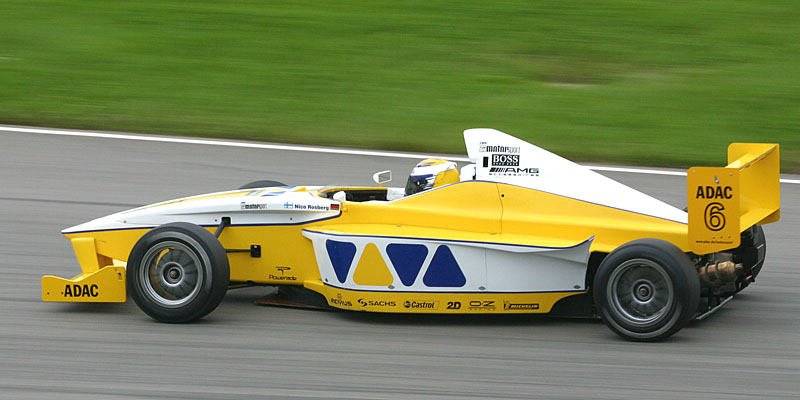
Nico Rosberg: 2002 FBMW ADAC champion

=== Germany & Europe ===
Formula BMW ADAC is sanctioned by the Allgemeiner Deutscher Automobil Club e.V., Europe's largest automobile association. It was immediately popular with teams and drivers alike, attracting 32 entries in its first season. Since 2004, the ADAC championship has included a support event for the European Grand Prix at the Nürburgring.

2002 champion Nico Rosberg joined the Williams Formula One team in 2006 and the 2004 champion Sebastian Vettel became a test driver for the BMW Sauber team later the same year. Vettel has since graduated to a full-time Formula One race driver, setting several drivers' records and becoming the youngest Formula One champion in history after the 2010 Formula One Championship season. The 2005 championship was decided in an appeal court, which penalised Switzerland's Sebastian Buemi with a 60-second penalty for a driving infringement. This handed the title to Nico Hülkenberg. In the immediate aftermath of the incident in question, both drivers had been given 30-second penalties. The 2006 champion, Christian Vietoris, went on to dominate that year's World Final in Valencia, in which he secured pole position, finished in first place in all three qualification heats, and won the final itself.

The German series merged with the UK series to form the BMW Europe series in 2008. The series raced for three years before being axed at the end of the 2010 season, in favour of the new Formula BMW Talent Cup, which started in 2011.

=== Asia & Pacific ===
Formula BMW Asia was the second championship to be created. It was inaugurated in 2003 under the management of Motorsport Asia Limited, and functioned as a replacement for Formula Asia. Its creation is part of the growth in popularity of organised single seater motorsport in east Asia, and it forms the start of a career ladder below the Asian Formula 3 Pacific Series and Formula V6 Asia. Events have been held at Sepang in Malaysia; Bira in Thailand; Sentul in Indonesia; and Shanghai, Zhuhai, Beijing in China, Macau and Singapore. It has appeared on the support bill at the Malaysian, Chinese, Bahrain, Macau and Singapore Grand Prix. It was renamed Formula BMW Pacific for the 2008 season.

=== United States & Americas ===
Founded in 2004 and originally known as Formula BMW USA, the series changed its name to Formula BMW Americas starting with the 2008 season. The series was sanctioned by IMSA, and it has appeared on the support bill for ALMS, Champ Car, Grand-Am, Indy Racing League and Formula One events. In its first four years of existence (2004–2007), the Formula BMW USA series supported both the Canadian and United States Formula One Grands Prix.

The 2007 BMW USA champion was the previous season's Rookie of the Year, Daniel Morad of Canada, who secured the title with six wins. Mexico's Esteban Gutiérrez took over the Rookie title.

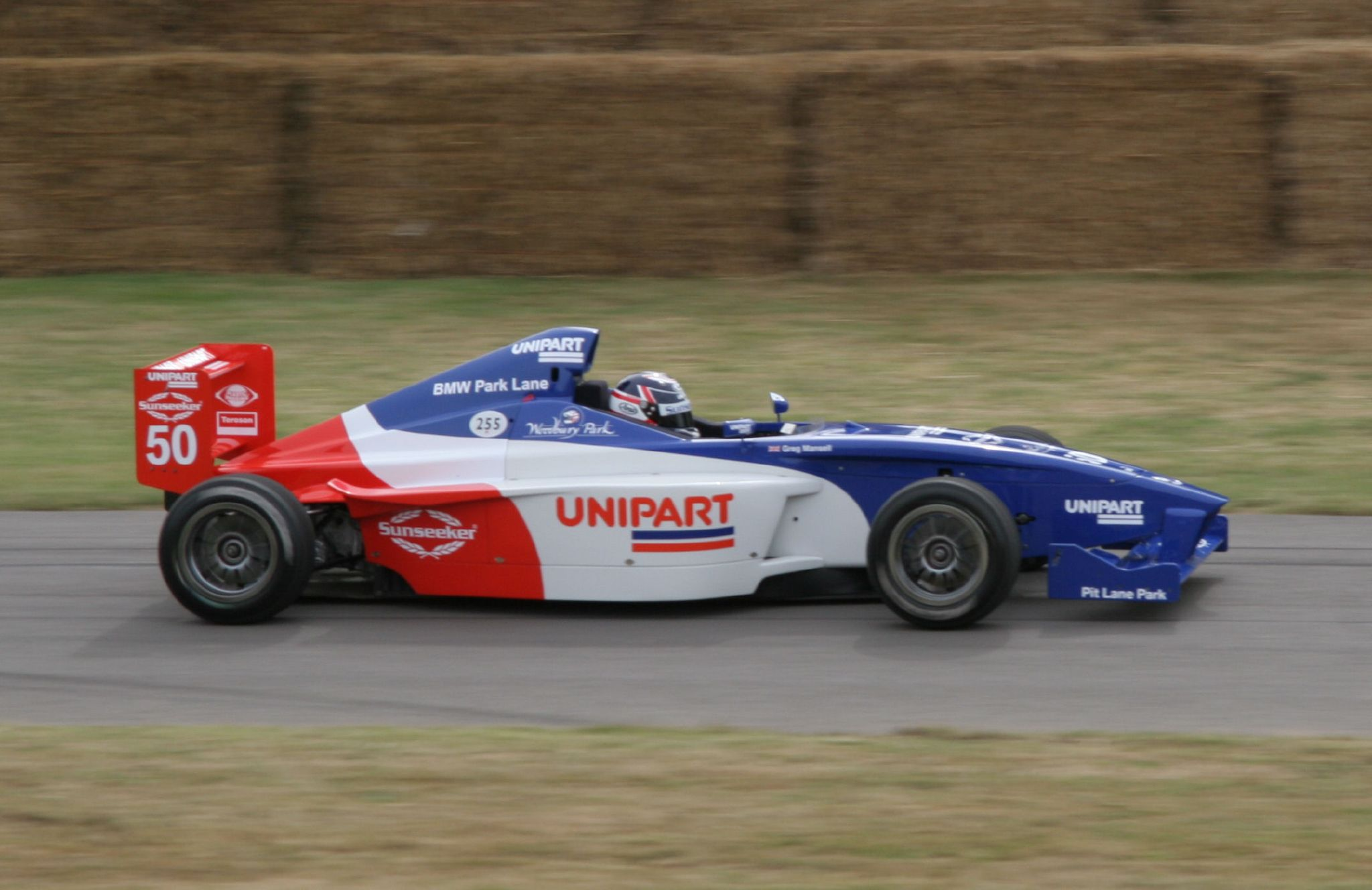
Greg Mansell at Goodwood

The Americas championship was disbanded at the conclusion of the 2009 season which saw only 13 drivers participate in a race.

=== United Kingdom ===
When Formula BMW UK was formed, it had to compete in a crowded marketplace with a number of series based on Formula Ford and Formula Renault regulations, together with smaller series such as Zip Formula. However, as with the other BMW championships, the UK series quickly proved to be a success. It attracted 25 entrants in its inaugural season in 2004, which increased to 28 the following season. Former Formula One and Indycar champion Nigel Mansell became involved as an ambassador for the series after his sons, Leo and Greg, began their single seater careers in the championship in 2006. He also works as a mentor with the BMW Education and Coaching Programme. 2007 was the last year for Formula BMW UK and the series merged with the German series to form the Europe series.

=== Formula Lista Junior ===
Formula Lista Junior is a feeder series to the main Formula BMW series. It has run since 2000 across mainland Europe and since 2008 has used Formula BMW FB02 chassis and engines to run its single-seaters. Former champions include Neel Jani and Romain Grosjean.

== Champions ==
Season	Series Name	Champion	Team Champion
1998	Formula BMW ADAC	(Germany) Stefan Mücke	(Germany) Mücke Motorsport
1999	Formula BMW ADAC	(Germany) André Lotterer	(Germany) BMW Rookie Team
1999	F. BMW Junior Cup	(Germany) Martin Tomczyk	
2000	Formula BMW ADAC	(Austria) Hannes Lachinger	(Germany) BMW Rookie Team
2000	F. BMW Junior Cup	(Portugal) Ricardo Megre	
2001	Formula BMW ADAC	(Germany) Timo Glock	(Germany) BMW Rookie Team
2001	F. BMW Junior Cup	(Portugal) Filipe Figueiredo e Silva	
2002	Formula BMW ADAC	(Finland) Nico Rosberg	(Germany) VIVA Racing
2002	F. BMW Junior Cup	(Portugal) Nuno Pinto	
2003	Formula BMW ADAC	(Germany) Maximilian Götz	(Germany) ADAC Berlin-Brandenburg
2003	Formula BMW Asia	(China) Ho-Pin Tung	(Malaysia) Team Meritus
2003	F. BMW Junior Cup	(Uruguay) Juan Caceres	
2004	Formula BMW ADAC	(Germany) Sebastian Vettel	(Germany) ADAC Berlin-Brandenburg
2004	Formula BMW Asia	(Hong Kong) Marchy Lee	(Malaysia) Team Meritus
2004	Formula BMW USA	(Germany) Andreas Wirth	(United States) HBR/Powerslide Motorsport
2004	Formula BMW UK	(United Kingdom) Tim Bridgman	Private entry ^{1}
2004	Formula Baviera	(Spain) Arturo Llobell	
2005	Formula BMW ADAC	(Germany) Nico Hülkenberg	(Germany) Josef Kaufmann Racing
2005	Formula BMW Asia	(Bahrain) Salman Al Khalifa	(Malaysia) Team Meritus
2005	Formula BMW USA	(France) Richard Philippe	(Canada) Team Autotecnica
2005	Formula BMW UK	(United Kingdom) Dean Smith	(United Kingdom) Nexa Racing
2005	Formula BMW World Final	(Germany) Marco Holzer	(Germany) AM-Holzer Rennsport
2006	Formula BMW ADAC	(Germany) Christian Vietoris	(Germany) Josef Kaufmann Racing
2006	Formula BMW Asia	(New Zealand) Earl Bamber	(Malaysia) Team Meritus
2006	Formula BMW USA	(Canada) Robert Wickens	(United States) EuroInternational ^{2}
2006	Formula BMW UK	(Republic of Ireland) Niall Breen	(United Kingdom) Fortec Motorsport
2006	Formula BMW World Final	(Germany) Christian Vietoris	(Germany) Josef Kaufmann Racing
2007	Formula BMW ADAC	(Germany) Jens Klingmann	(Germany) Eifelland Racing
2007	Formula BMW Asia	(Malaysia) Jazeman Jaafar	(Malaysia) CIMB Qi-Meritus
2007	Formula BMW USA	(Canada) Daniel Morad	(United States) EuroInternational
2007	Formula BMW UK	(Sweden) Marcus Ericsson	(United Kingdom) Fortec Motorsport
2007	Formula BMW World Final	(Austria) Philipp Eng	(Germany) Mücke Motorsport
2008	Formula BMW Pacific	(Hong Kong) Ross Jamison	(Malaysia) Team Meritus
2008	Formula BMW Europe	(Mexico) Esteban Gutiérrez	(Germany) Josef Kaufmann Racing
2008	Formula BMW Americas	(United States) Alexander Rossi	(United States) EuroInternational
2008	Formula BMW World Final	(United States) Alexander Rossi	(United States) EuroInternational
2009	Formula BMW Pacific	(Indonesia) Rio Haryanto	(Malaysia) Questnet Team Qi-Meritus
2009	Formula BMW Europe	(Brazil) Felipe Nasr	(United States) EuroInternational
2009	Formula BMW Americas	(Colombia) Gabriel Chaves	(United States) EuroInternational
2010	Formula BMW Pacific	(Singapore) Richard Bradley	(Philippines) Eurasia Motorsport
2010	Formula BMW Europe	(Netherlands) Robin Frijns	(Germany) Josef Kaufmann Racing
2011	Formula BMW Talent Cup	(Germany) Stefan Wackerbauer	n/a
2012	Formula BMW Talent Cup	(Germany) Marvin Dienst	n/a
2013	Formula BMW Talent Cup	(Sweden) Robin Hansson	n/a

^{1} Tim Bridgman competed in a small independent family-run team.
^{2} Robert Wickens began the 2006 season with Apex Racing USA, before switching to EuroInternational.

== Race of Champions ==
In 2005, a special Formula BMW invitational event was held as part of the Race of Champions at the Stade de France in Paris. BMW invited one driver from each of the four championships: Robert Wickens from the USA series; Nico Hülkenberg from the German series; Dean Smith from the UK series; and Bahrain's Salman Al Khalifa from the Asian championship. Wickens, of Canada, was the 2005 Rookie of the Year in the US, and was up against the champions from the other series, but showed his potential by winning the event.
