= 2008 Masters of Formula 3 =

Race details
Date	10 August 2008
Official name	RTL GP Masters of Formula 3
Location	Zolder, Belgium
Course	3.977 km (2.471 mi)
Distance	28 laps, 111.356 km (69.193 mi)

Pole
Driver	(Germany) Nico Hülkenberg	ART Grand Prix
Time	1:24.280

Fastest Lap
Driver	(United Kingdom) Max Chilton	Hitech Racing
Time	1:31.197 (on lap 24 of 28)

Podium
First	(France) Jules Bianchi	ART Grand Prix
Second	(Germany) Nico Hülkenberg	ART Grand Prix
Third	(United Kingdom) Jon Lancaster	ART Grand Prix

The 2008 RTL GP Masters of Formula 3 was the eighteenth Masters of Formula 3 race held at Zolder on 10 August 2008. It was won by Jules Bianchi, for ART Grand Prix.

== Drivers and teams ==
2008 Entry List
Team	No	Driver	Chassis	Engine	Main series
(France) ART Grand Prix	1	(Germany) Nico Hülkenberg	Dallara F308	Mercedes	Formula 3 Euro Series
(France) ART Grand Prix	2	(United Kingdom) James Jakes	Dallara F308	Mercedes	Formula 3 Euro Series
(France) ART Grand Prix	3	(United Kingdom) Jon Lancaster	Dallara F308	Mercedes	Formula 3 Euro Series
(France) ART Grand Prix	4	(France) Jules Bianchi	Dallara F308	Mercedes	Formula 3 Euro Series
(France) Signature-Plus	5	(France) Franck Mailleux	Dallara F308	Volkswagen	Formula 3 Euro Series
(France) Signature-Plus	6	(Italy) Edoardo Mortara	Dallara F308	Volkswagen	Formula 3 Euro Series
(France) Signature-Plus	7	(United Kingdom) Martin Plowman	Dallara F308	Volkswagen	Formula 3 Euro Series
(France) Signature-Plus	8	(France) Jean Karl Vernay	Dallara F308	Volkswagen	Formula 3 Euro Series
(United Kingdom) Ultimate Motorsport	9	(Republic of Ireland) Michael Devaney	Mygale M08	Mercedes	British Formula 3
(United Kingdom) Ultimate Motorsport	10	(Angola) Ricardo Teixeira	Mygale M08	Mercedes	British Formula 3
(United Kingdom) Ultimate Motorsport	11	(Argentina) Esteban Guerrieri	Mygale M08	Mercedes	British Formula 3
(Germany) Mücke Motorsport	12	(Finland) Mika Mäki	Dallara F308	Mercedes	Formula 3 Euro Series
(Germany) Mücke Motorsport	14	(Czech Republic) Erik Janiš	Dallara F308	Mercedes	Formula 3 Euro Series
(Germany) Mücke Motorsport	15	(Germany) Christian Vietoris	Dallara F308	Mercedes	Formula 3 Euro Series
(United Kingdom) Hitech Racing	16	(United Kingdom) Max Chilton	Dallara F308	Mercedes	British Formula 3
(United Kingdom) Hitech Racing	17	(Spain) Roberto Merhi	Dallara F308	Mercedes	Formula Renault 2.0 WEC
(Italy) Prema Powerteam	18	(Spain) Dani Clos	Dallara F308	Mercedes	Formula 3 Euro Series
(Italy) Prema Powerteam	19	(Netherlands) Renger van der Zande	Dallara F308	Mercedes	Formula 3 Euro Series
(Italy) Prema Powerteam	21	(Monaco) Stefano Coletti	Dallara F308	Mercedes	Formula 3 Euro Series
(United Kingdom) Manor Motorsport	22	(Japan) Koudai Tsukakoshi	Dallara F308	Mercedes	Formula 3 Euro Series
(United Kingdom) Manor Motorsport	23	(United Kingdom) Sam Bird	Dallara F308	Mercedes	Formula 3 Euro Series
(United Kingdom) Manor Motorsport	24	(Republic of Ireland) Niall Breen	Dallara F308	Mercedes	Formula 3 Euro Series
(United Kingdom) Manor Motorsport	25	(Japan) Kazuya Oshima	Dallara F308	Mercedes	Formula 3 Euro Series
(France) SG Formula	26	(Netherlands) Henkie Waldschmidt	Dallara F308	Mercedes	Formula 3 Euro Series
(France) SG Formula	27	(France) Yann Clairay	Dallara F308	Mercedes	Formula 3 Euro Series
(France) SG Formula	28	(Australia) Daniel Ricciardo	Dallara F308	Mercedes	Formula Renault 2.0 WEC
(Austria) HBR Motorsport	29	(Lebanon) Basil Shaaban	Dallara F308	Mercedes	Formula 3 Euro Series
(Austria) HBR Motorsport	30	(Spain) Daniel Campos-Hull	Dallara F308	Mercedes	Formula 3 Euro Series
(Switzerland) Jo Zeller Racing	31	(France) Tom Dillmann	Dallara F308	Mercedes	Formula 3 Euro Series
(United Kingdom) JTR	33	(United Kingdom) Nick Tandy	Mygale M08	Mercedes	British Formula 3
(United Kingdom) Räikkönen Robertson Racing	34	(United Kingdom) Henry Arundel	Dallara F308	Mercedes	British Formula 3
(United Kingdom) Räikkönen Robertson Racing	35	(Finland) Atte Mustonen	Dallara F308	Mercedes	British Formula 3
(United Kingdom) Räikkönen Robertson Racing	36	(Australia) John Martin	Dallara F308	Mercedes	British Formula 3
(United Kingdom) Carlin Motorsport	37	(New Zealand) Brendon Hartley	Dallara F308	Mercedes	British Formula 3
(United Kingdom) Carlin Motorsport	38	(Spain) Jaime Alguersuari	Dallara F308	Mercedes	British Formula 3
(United Kingdom) Carlin Motorsport	39	(France) Richard Philippe	Dallara F308	Mercedes	Formula 3 Euro Series
(United Kingdom) Carlin Motorsport	40	(Venezuela) Rodolfo González	Dallara F308	Mercedes	Formula 3 Euro Series

== Classification ==
=== Qualifying 1 ===
Group A drivers are highlighted in green.

==== Odd numbers ====
Pos	No	Name	Team	Time
1	1	(Germany) Nico Hülkenberg	ART Grand Prix	1:24.971
2	21	(Monaco) Stefano Coletti	Prema Powerteam	1:25.148
3	19	(Netherlands) Renger van der Zande	Prema Powerteam	1:25.241
4	39	(France) Richard Philippe	Carlin Motorsport	1:25.427
5	37	(New Zealand) Brendon Hartley	Carlin Motorsport	1:25.446
6	15	(Germany) Christian Vietoris	Mücke Motorsport	1:25.472
7	9	(Republic of Ireland) Michael Devaney	Ultimate Motorsport	1:25.584
8	3	(United Kingdom) Jon Lancaster	ART Grand Prix	1:25.777
9	33	(United Kingdom) Nick Tandy	JTR	1:25.789
10	17	(Spain) Roberto Merhi	Hitech Racing	1:25.805
11	23	(United Kingdom) Sam Bird	Manor Motorsport	1:25.823
12	27	(France) Yann Clairay	SG Formula	1:26.059
13	35	(Finland) Atte Mustonen	Räikkönen Robertson Racing	1:26.211
14	5	(France) Franck Mailleux	Signature-Plus	1:26.321
15	11	(Argentina) Esteban Guerrieri	Ultimate Motorsport	1:26.352
16	31	(France) Tom Dillmann	Jo Zeller Racing	1:26.393
17	7	(United Kingdom) Martin Plowman	Signature-Plus	1:26.541
18	25	(Japan) Kazuya Oshima	Manor Motorsport	1:26.606
19	29	(Lebanon) Basil Shaaban	HBR Motorsport	1:26.798

==== Even numbers ====
Pos	No	Name	Team	Time
1	12	(Finland) Mika Mäki	Mücke Motorsport	1:24.485
2	22	(Japan) Koudai Tsukakoshi	Manor Motorsport	1:24.586
3	4	(France) Jules Bianchi	ART Grand Prix	1:24.903
4	38	(Spain) Jaime Alguersuari	Carlin Motorsport	1:24.920
5	18	(Spain) Dani Clos	Prema Powerteam	1:25.073
6	40	(Venezuela) Rodolfo González	Carlin Motorsport	1:25.138
7	16	(United Kingdom) Max Chilton	Hitech Racing	1:25.141
8	26	(Netherlands) Henkie Waldschmidt	SG Formula	1:25.169
9	6	(Italy) Edoardo Mortara	Signature-Plus	1:25.195
10	30	(Spain) Daniel Campos-Hull	HBR Motorsport	1:25.289
11	8	(France) Jean Karl Vernay	Signature-Plus	1:25.289
12	14	(Czech Republic) Erik Janiš	Mücke Motorsport	1:25.386
13	24	(Republic of Ireland) Niall Breen	Manor Motorsport	1:25.447
14	36	(Australia) John Martin	Räikkönen Robertson Racing	1:25.675
15	28	(Australia) Daniel Ricciardo	SG Formula	1:25.755
16	2	(United Kingdom) James Jakes	ART Grand Prix	1:25.884
17	34	(United Kingdom) Henry Arundel	Räikkönen Robertson Racing	1:26.022
18	10	(Angola) Ricardo Teixeira	Ultimate Motorsport	1:26.673

=== Qualifying 2 ===
==== Group A ====
Pos	No	Name	Team	Time
1	1	(Germany) Nico Hülkenberg	ART Grand Prix	1:24.280
2	4	(France) Jules Bianchi	ART Grand Prix	1:24.550
3	19	(Netherlands) Renger van der Zande	Prema Powerteam	1:24.640
4	22	(Japan) Koudai Tsukakoshi	Manor Motorsport	1:24.813
5	21	(Monaco) Stefano Coletti	Prema Powerteam	1:24.869
6	16	(United Kingdom) Max Chilton	Hitech Racing	1:24.884
7	3	(United Kingdom) Jon Lancaster	ART Grand Prix	1:25.044
8	12	(Finland) Mika Mäki	Mücke Motorsport	1:25.058
9	37	(New Zealand) Brendon Hartley	Carlin Motorsport	1:25.071
10	30	(Spain) Daniel Campos-Hull	HBR Motorsport	1:25.086
11	40	(Venezuela) Rodolfo González	Carlin Motorsport	1:25.109
12	39	(France) Richard Philippe	Carlin Motorsport	1:25.113
13	38	(Spain) Jaime Alguersuari	Carlin Motorsport	1:25.117
14	26	(Netherlands) Henkie Waldschmidt	SG Formula	1:25.139
15	6	(Italy) Edoardo Mortara	Signature-Plus	1:25.203
16	15	(Germany) Christian Vietoris	Mücke Motorsport	1:25.294
17	17	(Spain) Roberto Merhi	Hitech Racing	1:25.299
18	33	(United Kingdom) Nick Tandy	JTR	1:25.452
19	9	(Republic of Ireland) Michael Devaney	Ultimate Motorsport	1:25.597
20	18	(Spain) Dani Clos	Prema Powerteam	1:26.157

==== Group B ====
Pos	No	Name	Team	Time
1	31	(France) Tom Dillmann	Jo Zeller Racing	1:24.860
2	23	(United Kingdom) Sam Bird	Manor Motorsport	1:24.900
3	27	(France) Yann Clairay	SG Formula	1:25.129
4	35	(Finland) Atte Mustonen	Räikkönen Robertson Racing	1:25.233
5	2	(United Kingdom) James Jakes	ART Grand Prix	1:25.471
6	14	(Czech Republic) Erik Janiš	Mücke Motorsport	1:25.502
7	28	(Australia) Daniel Ricciardo	SG Formula	1:25.525
8	36	(Australia) John Martin	Räikkönen Robertson Racing	1:25.682
9	11	(Argentina) Esteban Guerrieri	Ultimate Motorsport	1:25.725
10	8	(France) Jean Karl Vernay	Signature-Plus	1:25.729
11	25	(Japan) Kazuya Oshima	Manor Motorsport	1:25.789
12	24	(Republic of Ireland) Niall Breen	Manor Motorsport	1:25.921
13	34	(United Kingdom) Henry Arundel	Räikkönen Robertson Racing	1:25.939
14	29	(Lebanon) Basil Shaaban	HBR Motorsport	1:26.160
15	7	(United Kingdom) Martin Plowman	Signature-Plus	1:26.349
16	5	(France) Franck Mailleux	Signature-Plus	1:26.565
17	10	(Angola) Ricardo Teixeira	Ultimate Motorsport	1:27.207

=== Starting grid ===
1	(Germany) Nico Hülkenberg	ART Grand Prix	2	(France) Jules Bianchi	ART Grand Prix
3	(Netherlands) Renger van der Zande	Prema Powerteam	4	(Japan) Koudai Tsukakoshi	Manor Motorsport
5	(Monaco) Stefano Coletti	Prema Powerteam	6	(United Kingdom) Max Chilton	Hitech Racing
7	(United Kingdom) Jon Lancaster	ART Grand Prix	8	(Finland) Mika Mäki	Mücke Motorsport
9	(New Zealand) Brendon Hartley	Carlin Motorsport	10	(Spain) Daniel Campos-Hull	HBR Motorsport
11	(Venezuela) Rodolfo González	Carlin Motorsport	12	(France) Richard Philippe	Carlin Motorsport
13	(Spain) Jaime Alguersuari	Carlin Motorsport	14	(Netherlands) Henkie Waldschmidt	SG Formula
15	(Italy) Edoardo Mortara	Signature-Plus	16	(Germany) Christian Vietoris	Mücke Motorsport
17	(Spain) Roberto Merhi	Hitech Racing	18	(United Kingdom) Nick Tandy	JTR
19	(Republic of Ireland) Michael Devaney	Ultimate Motorsport	20	(Spain) Dani Clos	Prema Powerteam
21	(France) Tom Dillmann	Jo Zeller Racing	22	(United Kingdom) Sam Bird	Manor Motorsport
23	(France) Yann Clairay	SG Formula	24	(Finland) Atte Mustonen	Räikkönen Robertson Racing
25	(United Kingdom) James Jakes	ART Grand Prix	26	(Czech Republic) Erik Janiš	Mücke Motorsport
27	(Australia) Daniel Ricciardo	SG Formula	28	(Australia) John Martin	Räikkönen Robertson Racing
29	(Argentina) Esteban Guerrieri	Ultimate Motorsport	30	(France) Jean Karl Vernay	Signature-Plus
31	(Japan) Kazuya Oshima	Manor Motorsport	32	(Republic of Ireland) Niall Breen	Manor Motorsport
33	(United Kingdom) Henry Arundel	Räikkönen Robertson Racing	34	(Lebanon) Basil Shaaban	HBR Motorsport
35	(United Kingdom) Martin Plowman	Signature-Plus	36	(France) Franck Mailleux	Signature-Plus
37	(Angola) Ricardo Teixeira	Ultimate Motorsport			

=== Race ===
Pos	No	Driver	Team	Laps	Time/Retired	Grid
1	4	(France) Jules Bianchi	ART Grand Prix	28	45:19.275	2
2	1	(Germany) Nico Hülkenberg	ART Grand Prix	28	+4.495	1
3	3	(United Kingdom) Jon Lancaster	ART Grand Prix	28	+20.539	7
4	12	(Finland) Mika Mäki	Mücke Motorsport	28	+27.030	8
5	37	(New Zealand) Brendon Hartley	Carlin Motorsport	28	+34.170	9
6	35	(Finland) Atte Mustonen	Räikkönen Robertson Racing	28	+40.536	24
7	23	(United Kingdom) Sam Bird	Manor Motorsport	28	+53.861	22
8	38	(Spain) Jaime Alguersuari	Carlin Motorsport	28	+57.479	13
9	40	(Venezuela) Rodolfo González	Carlin Motorsport	28	+1:03.294	11
10	8	(France) Jean Karl Vernay	Signature-Plus	28	+1:10.049	30
11	14	(Czech Republic) Erik Janiš	Mücke Motorsport	28	+1:14.649	26
12	9	(Republic of Ireland) Michael Devaney	Ultimate Motorsport	28	+1:14.810	19
13	34	(United Kingdom) Henry Arundel	Räikkönen Robertson Racing	28	+1:18.153	33
14	7	(United Kingdom) Martin Plowman	Signature-Plus	28	+1:20.051	35
15	6	(Italy) Edoardo Mortara	Signature-Plus	28	+1:27.377	15
16	31	(France) Tom Dillmann	Jo Zeller Racing	27	+1 lap	21
17	2	(United Kingdom) James Jakes	ART Grand Prix	27	+1 lap	25
18	15	(Germany) Christian Vietoris	Mücke Motorsport	27	+1 lap	16
19	11	(Argentina) Esteban Guerrieri	Ultimate Motorsport	27	+1 lap	29
20	25	(Japan) Kazuya Oshima	Manor Motorsport	27	+1 lap	31
21	16	(United Kingdom) Max Chilton	Hitech Racing	26	+2 laps	6
22	24	(Republic of Ireland) Niall Breen	Manor Motorsport	26	+2 laps	32
23	36	(Australia) John Martin	Räikkönen Robertson Racing	26	+2 laps	28
24	27	(France) Yann Clairay	SG Formula	25	+3 laps	23
Ret	21	(Monaco) Stefano Coletti	Prema Powerteam	24	Retired	5
Ret	33	(United Kingdom) Nick Tandy	JTR	23	Retired	18
Ret	17	(Spain) Roberto Merhi	Hitech Racing	21	Retired	17
Ret	30	(Spain) Daniel Campos-Hull	HBR Motorsport	19	Retired	10
Ret	39	(France) Richard Philippe	Carlin Motorsport	16	Retired	12
Ret	26	(Netherlands) Henkie Waldschmidt	SG Formula	15	Retired	14
Ret	18	(Spain) Dani Clos	Prema Powerteam	6	Retired	20
Ret	22	(Japan) Koudai Tsukakoshi	Manor Motorsport	1	Retired	4
Ret	19	(Netherlands) Renger van der Zande	Prema Powerteam	0	Retired	3
Ret	28	(Australia) Daniel Ricciardo	SG Formula	0	Retired	27
Ret	29	(Lebanon) Basil Shaaban	HBR Motorsport	0	Retired	34
Ret	5	(France) Franck Mailleux	Signature-Plus	0	Retired	36
Ret	10	(Angola) Ricardo Teixeira	Ultimate Motorsport	0	Retired	37
Fastest lap: Max Chilton, 1:31.197, 158.334 km/h (98.384 mph) on lap 24

== See also ==
- 2008 Formula 3 Euro Series season
- 2008 British Formula 3 season
