= Jens Klingmann =

German racing driver (born 1990)

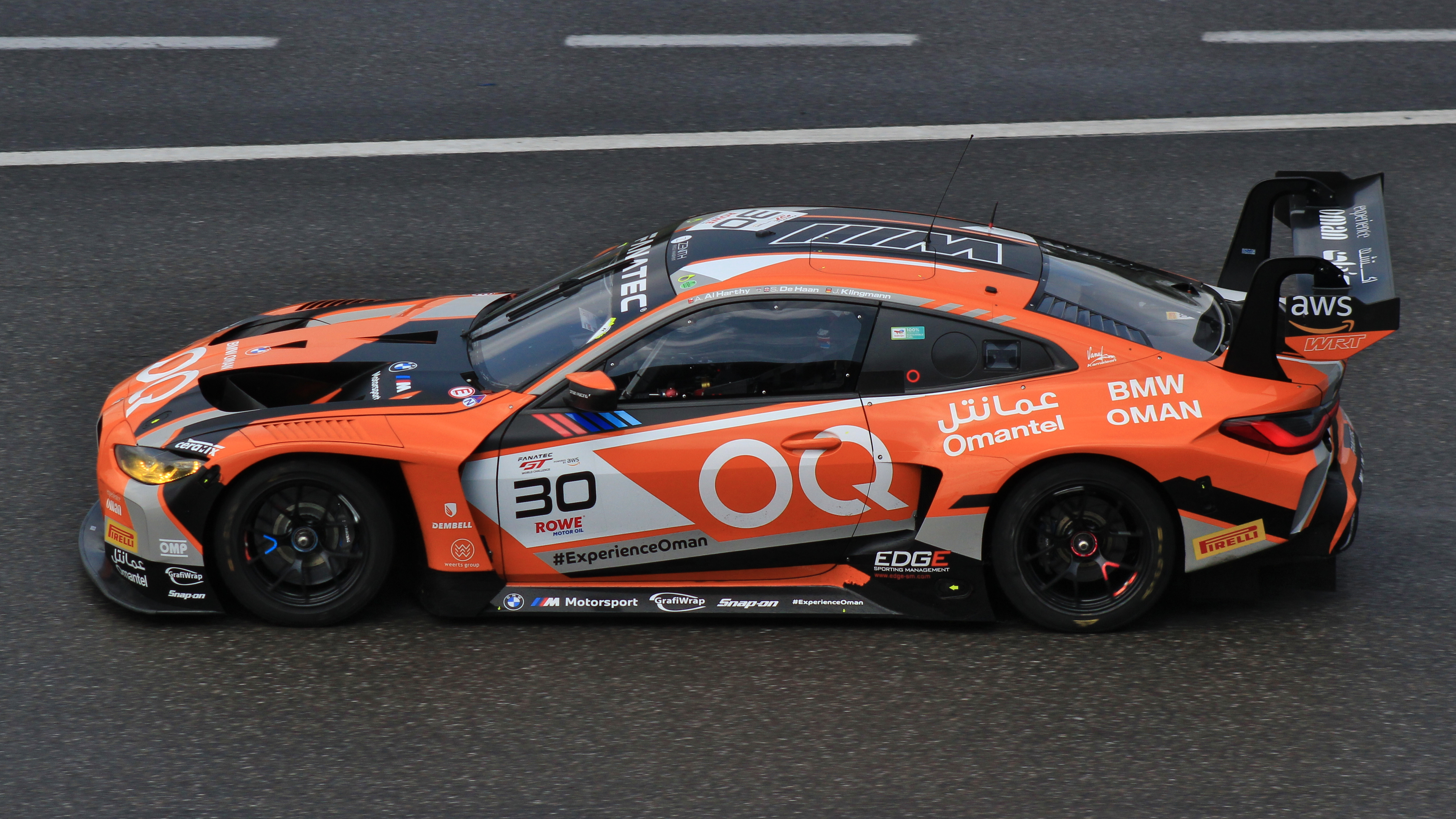
- Nationality: (Germany) German
- Born: 16 July 1990 (age 36) Heidelberg, West Germany

FIA GT3 European Championship career
- Debut season: 2009
- Current team: Alpina
- Categorisation: FIA Gold
- Car number: 25
- Starts: 8
- Wins: 0
- Poles: 1
- Fastest laps: 0
- Best finish: 18th in 2009

Previous series
- 2009 2008 2006–07: ADAC GT Masters; Formula 3 Euro Series; Formula BMW ADAC

Championship titles
- 2026 2026, 2024, 2023 2007: GT World Challenge Europe Endurance Cup - Gold Cup; Italian GT Championship Sprint Cup; Formula BMW ADAC

Jens Klingmann (born 16 July 1990 in Heidelberg) is a German racing driver and BMW Motorsport works driver.

== Racing career ==
=== Karting foundation ===
Klingmann began competitive karting in 1998 at the age of eight. Over an eight-year period, he contested various regional and national German junior karting championships before transitioning to single-seaters ahead of the 2006 season.

=== Open-wheel formula career ===
==== Formula BMW ADAC ====
In 2006, Klingmann entered the Formula BMW ADAC championship with Eifelland Racing as an official BMW Junior driver. He recorded four podium finishes over the 18-race season, finishing fourth in the final standings with 121 points and winning the "Rookie of the Year" award. He finished his first FBMW campaign fourth in the Drivers' Championship with 121 points behind fellow German Marco Holzer. He concluded the year with a seventh-place finish at the Formula BMW World Final.

He remained with Eifelland Racing for the 2007 season and won the drivers' championship title. Klingmann won 11 of the 18 races to finish the season with 699 points, ahead of runner-up Daniel Campos-Hull and third-placed Philipp Eng. He also secured a third-place podium finish at the season-ending Formula BMW World Final.

==== Formula 3 Euro Series ====
Klingmann moved up to the Formula 3 Euro Series in 2008, driving a Dallara F308-Volkswagen for RC Motorsport. He did not score points during the 20-race calendar and finished 27th in the final championship standings. Following the 2008 campaign, he left single-seaters to focus on GT racing.

=== GT and sports car career ===
==== ADAC GT Masters ====
Klingmann entered sports car racing in 2009, contesting several series. In the ADAC GT Masters, he drove an Alpina B6 GT3 and finished 14th in the standings, taking a race win at Oschersleben. He also placed 18th in the FIA GT3 European Championship. For the 2010 season, he joined Abt Sportsline, winning races at the Sachsenring and Hockenheim to finish fifth in the final drivers' championship.

Between 2011 and 2013, Klingmann drove the BMW Z4 GT3 for various customer entries, regularizing his appearances on the Nordschleife. In 2015, he returned to a full-time ADAC GT Masters campaign with Schubert Motorsport alongside Dominik Baumann. The pair won four races, placing Klingmann third in the final points classification.

==== BMW factory driver appointment ====
Klingmann was promoted to the official BMW M Motorsport factory driver roster at the beginning of 2014. In August 2014, while competing in the Nürburgring Endurance Series (VLN) for Schubert Motorsport, he set a qualifying lap time of 7:59.045 minutes, recording one of the first official sub-eight-minute laps on the 24.358-kilometer Nordschleife layout.

==== IMSA WeatherTech SportsCar Championship ====
Klingmann made his first North American appearances in 2015, joining BMW Team RLL for selected IMSA WeatherTech SportsCar Championship events and finishing second in the GTLM class in wet conditions at Petit Le Mans. He moved to Turner Motorsport for a full-time GTD program in 2016, driving the new BMW M6 GT3 to a second-place finish at the 12 Hours of Sebring and an inaugural North American victory at Mosport with Bret Curtis. He finished the 2016 standings in sixth place and remained with the team in 2017, taking another class victory at Road America to finish eleventh in points.

==== International endurance events ====
In European endurance programs, Klingmann finished second overall at the 2018 24 Hours of Spa driving a Walkenhorst Motorsport BMW M6 GT3. Two years later, he took an overall third-place finish at the 2020 24 Hours of Nürburgring as a driver for BMW Team Schnitzer.

==== Italian GT Championship ====
Klingmann shifted his seasonal program to the Italian GT Championship Sprint Cup in 2022, finishing his first season as the series runner-up. In 2023, he paired with Bruno Spengler at the BMW Italia Ceccato Racing team, which operated under the administrative management of ROAL Motorsport. Driving a BMW M4 GT3, Klingmann and Spengler won the Italian GT Sprint driver title at the final round in Monza.

He defended his title in the 2024 season to become a consecutive Italian GT Sprint Cup champion. Due to rotational driver schedules, Klingmann registered points alongside changing factory teammates, including Max Hesse, Jake Dennis, and Raffaele Marciello, securing the championship during a double-victory weekend at Monza with 124 points.

In the 2025 season, he remained with Ceccato Racing alongside Jesse Krohn. The duo finished the year as the Sprint Cup championship runner-up, highlighting their campaign with a race win at Mugello while managing development tracking for the updated BMW M4 GT3 Evo package.

He defended his title in the 2024 season to become a consecutive Italian GT Sprint Cup champion. Due to rotational driver schedules, Klingmann registered points alongside changing factory teammates, including Max Hesse, Jake Dennis, and Raffaele Marciello, securing the championship during a double-victory weekend at Monza with 124 points. In the 2025 season, he remained with Ceccato Racing alongside Jesse Krohn, finishing the year as the Sprint Cup championship runner-up with a race win at Mugello for the updated BMW M4 GT3 Evo package.

==== Recent programs ====
In May 2026, Klingmann joined Schubert Motorsport for the BMW M3 Touring 24H development project at the 24 Hours of Nürburgring. He shared the vehicle with Connor De Phillippi, Ugo de Wilde, and Neil Verhagen, finishing fifth overall and winning the custom SPX vehicle class. Concurrently, he was entered by ROWE Racing in the GT World Challenge Europe Endurance Cup, driving with Tim Tramnitz.

== Race results ==
=== Career summary ===
Season	Series	Team	Races	Wins	Poles	F/Laps	Podiums	Points	Position
2006	Formula BMW ADAC	Eifelland Racing	18	0	1	0	4	121	4th
2006	Formula BMW World Final	Eifelland Racing	1	0	0	0	0	N/A	7th
2007	Formula BMW ADAC	Eifelland Racing	18	10	7	8	15	699	**1st**
2007	Formula BMW World Final	Eifelland Racing	1	0	0	0	1	N/A	**3rd**
2008	Formula 3 Euro Series	RC Motorsport	20	0	0	0	0	0	29th
2009	FIA GT3 European Championship	Alpina	8	0	1	0	1	11	26th
2009	ADAC GT Masters	Alpina	6	1	2	2	2	23	14th
2009	Lamborghini Blancpain Super Trofeo - Pro	Lamborghini München Team Holzer	3	3	1	3	3	38	8th
2010	ADAC GT Masters	Abt Sportsline	14	2	0	0	4	45	5th
2011	ADAC GT Masters	Abt Sportsline	16	0	0	0	4	91	8th
2012	24 Hours of Nürburgring - SP9	BMW Team Vita4one	1	0	0	0	0	N/A	9th
2013	ADAC GT Masters	PIXUM Team Schubert	2	1	1	0	2	40	16th
2013	Blancpain Endurance Series	Marc VDS Racing Team	1	0	0	0	0	0	NC
2013	24 Hours of Nürburgring - SP9	BMW Team Schubert	1	0	0	0	0	N/A	6th
2014	ADAC GT Masters	PIXUM Team Schubert	16	0	1	1	1	92	9th
2014	Blancpain GT Sprint Series	BMW Sports Trophy Team Schubert	2	0	0	0	0	0	NC
2014	24 Hours of Nürburgring - SP9	BMW Sports Trophy Team Schubert	1	0	0	0	0	N/A	6th
2014	Blancpain Endurance Series	TDS Racing	1	0	0	0	0	0	NC†
2015	ADAC GT Masters	BMW Sports Trophy Team Schubert	14	4	0	1	4	156	**3rd**
2015	24 Hours of Nürburgring - SP9	BMW Sports Trophy Team Schubert	1	0	0	0	0	N/A	DNF
2015	United SportsCar Championship - GTLM	BMW Team RLL	3	0	0	0	1	91	13th
2015	24H Series - A6	Walkenhorst Motorsport							
2016	Blancpain GT Series Endurance Cup	Rowe Racing	2	0	0	0	0	0	NC
2016	IMSA SportsCar Championship - GTD	Turner Motorsport	11	2	0	2	3	279	6th
2016	24 Hours of Nürburgring - SP9	Schubert Motorsport	1	0	0	0	0	N/A	DNF
2017	Blancpain GT Series Sprint Cup	Rowe Racing	2	0	0	1	0	0	NC
2017	IMSA SportsCar Championship - GTD	Turner Motorsport	12	1	0	0	3	294	4th
2017	24H Series - SPX	Schubert Motorsport							
2017	24 Hours of Nürburgring - SP9	Schubert Motorsport	1	0	0	0	0	N/A	12th
2018	ADAC GT Masters	MRS GT-Racing	14	0	0	0	0	17	27th
2018	Blancpain GT Series Endurance Cup	Rowe Racing	5	0	0	0	1	27	17th
2018	IMSA SportsCar Championship - GTD	Turner Motorsport	1	0	0	0	0	17	58th
2018	24 Hours of Nürburgring - SP9	Falken Motorsports	1	0	0	0	0	N/A	15th
2019	ADAC GT Masters	MRS GT-Racing	14	1	1	1	1	71	14th
2019	IMSA SportsCar Championship - GTD	Turner Motorsport	1	0	0	0	0	22	52nd
2019	24 Hours of Nürburgring - SP9	Falken Motorsports	1	0	0	0	0	N/A	5th
2019–20	Asian Le Mans Series - GT	Astro Veloce Motorsport	2	0	0	0	1	25	12th
2020	ADAC GT Masters	MRS GT-Racing	10	1	0	0	2	54	19th
2020	GT World Challenge Europe Endurance Cup	Boutsen Ginion Racing	3	0	0	0	0	0	NC
2020	Intercontinental GT Challenge	Boutsen Ginion Racing	1	0	0	0	0	0	NC
2020	IMSA SportsCar Championship - GTD	Turner Motorsport	1	0	0	0	0	25	45th
2020	24 Hours of Nürburgring - SP9	BMW Team Schnitzer	1	0	0	0	1	N/A	**3rd**
2021	GT World Challenge Europe Endurance Cup	Boutsen Ginion Racing	5	0	0	0	0	0	NC
2021	24 Hours of Nürburgring - SP9	Schubert Motorsport	1	0	0	0	0	N/A	6th
2022	IMSA SportsCar Championship - GTD	Turner Motorsport	1	0	0	0	0	141	68th
2022	Italian GT Championship - Sprint - GT3	BMW Italia Ceccato Motors	8	1	3	4	5	78	**2nd**
2022	GT World Challenge Europe Endurance Cup	Walkenhorst Motorsport	1	0	0	0	0	0	NC
2022	24 Hours of Nürburgring - SP9	Schubert Motorsport	1	0	0	0	0	N/A	DNF
2022-23	Middle East Trophy - GT3	MS7 by Team WRT							
2023	GT World Challenge Asia - GT3	FIST - Team AAI	2	0	0	0	0	4	40th
2023	GT World Challenge Asia - GT3	GH - Team AAI	2	0	0	0	0	4	40th
2023	GT World Challenge Europe Endurance Cup	Team WRT	1	0	0	0	0	0	NC
2023	Italian GT Championship - Sprint - GT3	BMW Italia Ceccato Racing	8	2	0	0	5	98	**1st**
2023	IMSA SportsCar Championship - GTD	Turner Motorsport	1	0	0	0	0	161	64th
2023	Michelin Pilot Challenge - GS	Turner Motorsport	1	0	0	0	0	130	61st
2023	24 Hours of Nürburgring - SP9	Walkenhorst Motorsport	1	0	0	0	0	N/A	DNF
2024	GT World Challenge Europe Endurance Cup	OQ by Oman Racing	5	1	0	0	1	25	11th
2024	GT World Challenge Europe Endurance Cup - Bronze	OQ by Oman Racing	5	1	0	0	2	64	4th
2024	IMSA SportsCar Championship - GTD	Turner Motorsport	1	0	0	0	0	185	68th
2024	Italian GT Sprint Championship - GT3	BMW Italia Ceccato Racing	8	4	3	3	6	116	**1st**
2024	Nürburgring Langstrecken-Serie - SP3T	FK Performance Motorsport							
2024	24H Series - GT3	Poulsen Motorsport	1	0	0	0	1	46	18th
2025	IMSA SportsCar Championship - GTD	Turner Motorsport	1	0	0	0	0	278	66th
2025	GT World Challenge Europe Endurance Cup	AlManar Racing by WRT	5	0	0	0	1	31	10th
2025	GT World Challenge Europe Endurance Cup – Gold	AlManar Racing by WRT	5	2	0	0	4	108	**2nd**
2025	GT World Challenge Europe Sprint Cup	AlManar Racing by WRT	10	0	0	0	0	3.5	24th
2025	GT World Challenge Europe Sprint Cup – Gold	AlManar Racing by WRT	10	1	0	1	5	88	4th
2025	Italian GT Championship Sprint Cup - GT3	BMW Italia Ceccato Racing	8	3	0	0	6	100	**2nd**
2025	24 Hours of Nürburgring - SP3T	FK Performance Motorsport	1	1	0	0	1	N/A	**1st**
2025	International GT Open	Poulsen Motorsport	2	0	0	0	0	1	45th
2026	IMSA SportsCar Championship - GTD	Turner Motorsport	1	0	0	0	0	270	67th
2026	Nürburgring Langstrecken-Serie - SP9	Schubert Motorsport							
2026	Nürburgring Langstrecken-Serie - SP-X	Schubert Motorsport							
2026	24 Hours of Nürburgring - SP-X	Schubert Motorsport	1	1	1	1	1	N/A	**1st**
2026	GT World Challenge Europe Endurance Cup - Gold Cup	ROWE Racing	5	1	0	0	4	107	**1st**
2026	Italian GT Championship Sprint Cup - GT3	BMW Italia Ceccato Racing	8	3	0	1	4	84	**1st**

- Season still in progress.† As Klingmann was a guest driver, he was ineligible for points.

=== Complete Formula BMW ADAC results ===
(key) (Races in bold indicate pole position; races in italics indicate fastest lap)

Year	Entrant	1	2	3	4	5	6	7	8	9	10	11	12	13	14	15	16	17	18	Pos.	Points
2006	Eifelland Racing	HOC1; 1; 9	HOC1; 2; 10	LAU; 1 Ret	LAU; 2; 5	NÜR1; 1; 3	NÜR1; 2; 2	OSC1; 1; 14	OSC1; 2; 3	OSC2; 1; 4	**OSC2**; **2**; 3	NOR; 1; 4	NOR; 2; 4	NÜR2; 1; 5	NÜR2; 2; 6	ZAN; 1 Ret	ZAN; 2; 6	HOC2; 1; 8	HOC2; 2; 6	4th	121
2007	Eifelland Racing	OSC1; 1; 10	OSC1; 2; 1	**LAU**; **1**; 1	**LAU**; **2**; 1	**NOR**; **1**; 1	**NOR**; **2**; 1	NÜR1; 1; 2	NÜR1; 2; 2	ZAN; 1; 1	ZAN; 2 Ret	**OSC2**; **1**; 1	OSC2; 2; 2	NÜR2; 1; 1	NÜR2; 2; 4	**CAT**; **1**; 1	**CAT**; **2**; 4	HOC; 1; 2	HOC; 2; 3	1st	699

=== Complete Formula 3 Euro Series results ===
(key) (Races in bold indicate pole position; races in italics indicate fastest lap)

Year	Entrant	Chassis	Engine	1	2	3	4	5	6	7	8	9	10	11	12	13	14	15	16	17	18	19	20	Pos.	Points
2008	RC Motorsport	Dallara F308/032	Volkswagen	HOC; 1 Ret	HOC; 2 Ret	MUG; 1; 24	MUG; 2; 24	PAU; 1 Ret	PAU; 2; 20	NOR; 1; 15	NOR; 2; 10	ZAN; 1; 21	ZAN; 2; 18	NÜR; 1; 16	NÜR; 2; 10	BRH; 1; 11	BRH; 2; 11	CAT; 1; 11	CAT; 2; 8	LMS; 1; 27	LMS; 2; 15	HOC; 1; 22	HOC; 2; 16	27th	0

=== Complete FIA GT3 European Championship results ===
(key) (Races in bold indicate pole position; races in italics indicate fastest lap)

Year	Team	Car	1	2	3	4	5	6	7	8	9	10	11	12	Pos.	Points
2009	Alpina	Alpina B6 GT3	SIL; 1	SIL; 2	ADR; 1	ADR; 2	OSC; 1; 10	OSC; 2; 22	ALG; 1; 6	ALG; 2; 5	**LEC**; **1**; 2	LEC; 2; 18	ZOL; 1; 19	ZOL; 2; 14	26th	11

=== Complete ADAC GT Masters results ===
(key) (Races in bold indicate pole position; races in italics indicate fastest lap)

Year	Team	Car	1	2	3	4	5	6	7	8	9	10	11	12	13	14	15	16	Pos.	Points
2009	Alpina	Alpina B6 GT3	OSC; 1	OSC; 2	ASS; 1	ASS; 2	HOC; 1; 16	HOC; 2; 6	LAU; 1	LAU; 2	**NÜR**; **1**; 1	NÜR; 2 Ret	SAC; 1	SAC; 2	**OSC**; **1**; 2	OSC; 2 Ret			14th	23
2010	Abt Sportsline	Audi R8 LMS	OSC; 1; 6	OSC; 2; 2	**SAC**; **1**; 11	**SAC**; **2**; 9	HOC; 1; 8	HOC; 2; 8	**ASS**; **1** Ret	ASS; 2; 1	LAU; 1; 3	LAU; 2; 8	NÜR; 1; 6	NÜR; 2; 7	OSC; 1; 12	OSC; 2; 1			5th	45
2011	Abt Sportsline	Audi R8 LMS	OSC; 1; 3	OSC; 2; 2	**SAC**; **1**; 2	SAC; 2; 4	ZOL; 1; 11	ZOL; 2 Ret	NÜR; 1; 9	NÜR; 2; 5	RBR; 1; 21	RBR; 2; 11	LAU; 1; 10	LAU; 2 Ret	ASS; 1; 3	ASS; 2 Ret	HOC; 1; 28	HOC; 2; 29	8th	91
2013	PIXUM Team Schubert	BMW Z4 GT3	OSC; 1	OSC; 2	SPA; 1	SPA; 2	SAC; 1; 3	**SAC**; **2**; 1	NÜR; 1	NÜR; 2	RBR; 1	RBR; 2	LAU; 1	LAU; 2	SVK; 1	SVK; 2	HOC; 1	HOC; 2	16th	40
2014	PIXUM Team Schubert	BMW Z4 GT3	OSC; 1; 20	OSC; 2 Ret	ZAN; 1; 7	ZAN; 2; 7	LAU; 1 Ret	LAU; 2; 6	RBR; 1; 5	RBR; 2; 5	**SVK**; **1**; 2	**SVK**; **2**; 17†	NÜR; 1; 12	NÜR; 2; 5	SAC; 1 Ret	SAC; 2; 5	HOC; 1; 4	HOC; 2; 17	9th	92
2015	BMW Sports Trophy Team Schubert	BMW Z4 GT3	OSC; 1; 5	OSC; 2; 7	RBR; 1 Ret	RBR; 2 Ret	SPA; 1; 1	SPA; 2; 5	LAU; 1; 1	LAU; 2; 4	NÜR; 1; 12	NÜR; 2; 4	SAC; 1; 1	SAC; 2; 8	ZAN; 1; 10	**ZAN**; **2**; 1	HOC; 1	HOC; 2	3rd	156
2018	MRS GT-Racing	BMW M6 GT3	OSC; 1; 31	OSC; 2; 19	MST; 1; 5	MST; 2; 10	RBR; 1 Ret	RBR; 2; 7	NÜR; 1 Ret	NÜR; 2; 18	ZAN; 1 Ret	ZAN; 2; 29	SAC; 1; 12	SAC; 2 Ret	HOC; 1 Ret	HOC; 2; 20			27th	17
2019	MRS GT-Racing	BMW M6 GT3	OSC; 1; 16	OSC; 2; 6	MST; 1 Ret	MST; 2; 22	**RBR**; **1**; 1	RBR; 2; 4	ZAN; 1; 6	ZAN; 2 Ret	NÜR; 1; 10	NÜR; 2 Ret	HOC; 1; 18	HOC; 2; 26	SAC; 1; 14	SAC; 2; 12			14th	71
2020	MRS GT-Racing	BMW M6 GT3	LAU; 1 Ret	LAU; 2 Ret	NÜR; 1; 19	NÜR; 2; 31	HOC; 1; 24	HOC; 2; 25	SAC; 1; 10	SAC; 2; 9	RBR; 1; 3	RBR; 2; 1	LAU; 1	LAU; 2	OSC; 1 WD	OSC; 2 WD			19th	54

=== Complete 24 Hours of Nürburgring results ===
Year	Team	Co-Drivers	Car	Class	Laps	Pos.	Class Pos.
2012	(Germany) BMW Team Vita4One	(Sweden) Richard Göransson (Portugal) Pedro Lamy (Germany) Marco Wittmann	BMW Z4 GT3	SP9	150	9th	9th
2013	(Germany) BMW Team Schubert	(Germany) Dirk Adorf (Germany) Claudia Hürtgen (Germany) Martin Tomczyk	BMW Z4 GT3	SP9	87	6th	6th
2014	(Germany) BMW Sports Trophy Team Schubert	(Austria) Dominik Baumann (Germany) Claudia Hürtgen (Germany) Martin Tomczyk	BMW Z4 GT3	SP9	157	6th	6th
2015	(Germany) BMW Sports Trophy Team Schubert	(Austria) Dominik Baumann (Germany) Claudia Hürtgen (Germany) Martin Tomczyk	BMW Z4 GT3	SP9	157	DNF	DNF
2016	(Germany) Schubert Motorsport	(United States) John Edwards (Germany) Lucas Luhr (Germany) Martin Tomczyk	BMW M6 GT3	SP9	93	DNF	DNF
2017	(Germany) Schubert Motorsport	(United States) John Edwards (Germany) Tom Onslow-Cole	BMW M6 GT3	SP9	156	12th	12th
2018	(Germany) Falken Motorsports	(United Kingdom) Peter Dumbreck (Netherlands) Stef Dusseldorp (Switzerland) Alexandre Imperatori	BMW M6 GT3	SP9	130	15th	15th
2019	(Germany) Falken Motorsports	(United Kingdom) Peter Dumbreck (Netherlands) Stef Dusseldorp (Switzerland) Alexandre Imperatori	BMW M6 GT3	SP9	155	5th	5th
2020	(Germany) BMW Team Schnitzer	(Brazil) Augusto Farfus (South Africa) Sheldon van der Linde (Germany) Martin Tomczyk	BMW M6 GT3	SP9	85	**3rd**	**3rd**
2021	(Germany) Schubert Motorsport	(Netherlands) Stef Dusseldorp (Finland) Jesse Krohn (United Kingdom) Alexander Sims	BMW M6 GT3	SP9	59	6th	6th
2022	(Germany) Schubert Motorsport	(Finland) Jesse Krohn (Germany) Niklas Krütten (United Kingdom) Alexander Sims	BMW M4 GT3	SP9	153	DNF	DNF
2023	(Germany) Walkenhorst Motorsport	(United Kingdom) Jake Dennis (Norway) Christian Krognes (France) Thomas Neubauer	BMW M4 GT3	SP9	89	DNF	DNF
2025	(Germany) FK Performance Motorsport	(Germany) Michael Bräutigam (Belgium) Charles Weerts (Belgium) Ugo de Wilde	BMW M2 Racing (G87)	SP 3T	120	35th	**1st**
2026	(Germany) Schubert Motorsport	(United States) Connor De Phillippi (United States) Neil Verhagen (Belgium) Ugo de Wilde	BMW M3 Touring 24H	SP-X	156	4th	1st

=== Complete GT World Challenge Europe results ===
(key) (Races in bold indicate pole position; results in italics indicate fastest lap)

==== GT World Challenge Europe Endurance Cup ====
Year	Team	Car	Class	1	2	3	4	5	6	7	Pos.	Points
2013	Marc VDS Racing Team	BMW Z4 GT3	Pro	MNZ	SIL	LEC	SPA; 6H; Ret	SPA; 12H; Ret	SPA; 24H; Ret	NÜR	NC	0
2014	TDS Racing	BMW Z4 GT3	Pro	MNZ	SIL	LEC	SPA; 6H; 12	SPA; 12H; 9	SPA; 24H; Ret	NÜR	NC	0
2016	Rowe Racing	BMW M6 GT3	Pro	MNZ	SIL; 12	LEC; Ret	SPA; 6H	SPA; 12H	SPA; 24H	NÜR	NC	0
2018	Rowe Racing	BMW M6 GT3	Pro	MNZ; Ret	SIL; 13	LEC; 11	SPA; 6H; 7	SPA; 12H; 6	SPA; 24H; 2	CAT; 9	17th	27
2020	Boutsen Ginion Racing	BMW M6 GT3	Pro-Am	IMO	NÜR; Ret	SPA; 6H; 33	SPA; 12H; 25	SPA; 24H; 25	LEC; Ret		17th	21
2021	Boutsen Ginion Racing	BMW M6 GT3	Pro-Am	MNZ; Ret	LEC; 31	SPA; 6H; 48	SPA; 12H; 33	SPA; 24H; 35	NÜR; 42	CAT; 37	31st	8
2022	Walkenhorst Motorsport	BMW M4 GT3	Gold	IMO	LEC	SPA; 6H; 25	SPA; 12H; 27	SPA; 24H; 42†	HOC	CAT	19th	18
2023	Team WRT	BMW M4 GT3	Bronze	MNZ	LEC	SPA; 6H	SPA; 12H	SPA; 24H	NÜR; 28	CAT	27th	8
2024	OQ by Oman Racing	BMW M4 GT3	Bronze	LEC; 27	SPA; 6H; 43	SPA; 12H; 34	SPA; 24H; Ret	NÜR; 35	MNZ; 1	JED; 19	4th	64
2025	AlManar Racing by WRT	BMW M4 GT3 Evo	Gold	LEC; 10	MNZ; 4	SPA; 6H; 17	SPA; 12H; 21	SPA; 24H; 20	NÜR; 12	CAT; 2	2nd	108
2026	Rowe Racing	BMW M4 GT3 Evo	Gold	LEC; 10	MNZ; 23	SPA; 6H; 8	SPA; 12H; 10	SPA; 24H; 11	NÜR; 17	ALG; 7	1st	107

==== GT World Challenge Europe Sprint Cup ====
Year	Team	Car	Class	1	2	3	4	5	6	7	8	9	10	11	12	13	14	Pos.	Points
2014	BMW Sports Trophy Team Schubert	BMW Z4 GT3	Pro	NOG; QR	NOG; CR	BRH; QR	BRH; CR	ZAN; QR	ZAN; CR	SVK; QR	SVK; CR	ALG; QR	ALG; CR	ZOL; QR	ZOL; CR	BAK; QR; Ret	BAK; CR; Ret	NC	0
2017	Rowe Racing	BMW M6 GT3	Pro	MIS; QR	MIS; CR	BRH; QR	BRH; CR	ZOL; QR	ZOL; CR	HUN; QR	HUN; CR	NÜR; QR; 7	NÜR; CR; 11					NC	0
2025	AlManar Racing by WRT	BMW M4 GT3	Gold	BRH; 1; 19	BRH; 2; 8	ZAN; 1; 12	ZAN; 2; 18	MIS; 1 Ret	MIS; 2; 20	MAG; 1; 13	MAG; 2; 17	VAL; 1; 9	VAL; 2; 10					4th	88

=== Complete IMSA SportsCar Championship results ===
(key) (Races in bold indicate pole position; results in italics indicate fastest lap)

Year	Team	Class	Make	Engine	1	2	3	4	5	6	7	8	9	10	11	12	Pos.	Points	Ref
2015	BMW Team RLL	GTLM	BMW Z4 GTE	BMW P65 4.4 L V8	DAY; 4	SEB; 4	LBH	LGA	WGL	MOS	ELK	VIR	AUS	PET; 2			13th	91	
2016	Turner Motorsport	GTD	BMW M6 GT3	BMW S63 4.4 L Twin Turbo V8	DAY; 22	SEB; 2	LGA; 5	BEL; 9	WGL; 13	MOS; 1	LIM; 6	ELK; 7	VIR; 11	AUS; 1	PET; 9		6th	279	
2017	Turner Motorsport	GTD	BMW M6 GT3	BMW S63 4.4 L Twin Turbo V8	DAY; 8	SEB; 20	LBH; 9	AUS; 5	BEL; 4	WGL; 3	MOS; 4	LIM; 14	ELK; 1	VIR; 2	LGA; 5	PET; 15	4th	294	
2018	Turner Motorsport	GTD	BMW M6 GT3	BMW S63 4.4 L Twin Turbo V8	DAY; 14	SEB	MOH	BEL	WGL	MOS	LIM	ELK	VIR	LGA	PET		58th	17	
2019	Turner Motorsport	GTD	BMW M6 GT3	BMW S63 4.4 L Twin Turbo V8	DAY; 9	SEB	MDO	DET	WGL	MOS	LIM	ELK	VIR	LGA	PET		52nd	22	
2020	Turner Motorsport	GTD	BMW M6 GT3	BMW S63 4.4 L Twin Turbo V8	DAY; 6	DAY	SEB	ELK	VIR	ATL	MDO	CLT	PET	LGA	SEB		45th	25	
2022	Turner Motorsport	GTD	BMW M4 GT3	BMW P58 3.0 L Twin Turbo I6	DAY; 18	SEB	LBH	LGA	MDO	DET	WGL	MOS	LIM	ELK	VIR	PET	68th	141	
2023	Turner Motorsport	GTD	BMW M4 GT3	BMW P58 3.0 L Twin Turbo I6	DAY; 17	SEB	LBH	MON	WGL	MOS	LIM	ELK	VIR	IMS	PET		64th	161	
2024	Turner Motorsport	GTD	BMW M4 GT3	BMW P58 3.0 L Twin Turbo I6	DAY; 14	SEB	LBH	LGA	WGL	MOS	ELK	VIR	IMS	PET			58th	185	
2025	Turner Motorsport	GTD	BMW M4 GT3 Evo	BMW P58 3.0 L Twin Turbo I6	DAY; 5	SEB	LBH	LGA	WGL	MOS	ELK	VIR	IMS	PET			66th	278	
2026	Turner Motorsport	GTD	BMW M4 GT3 Evo	BMW P58 3.0 L Twin Turbo I6	DAY; 10	SEB	LBH	LGA	WGL	MOS	ELK	VIR	IMS	PET			67th	270	

Sporting positions
Preceded by Christian Vietoris	Formula BMW ADAC; Champion; 2007	Succeeded by Series merged into Formula BMW Europe
