= Jon Lancaster =

British racing driver (born 1988)

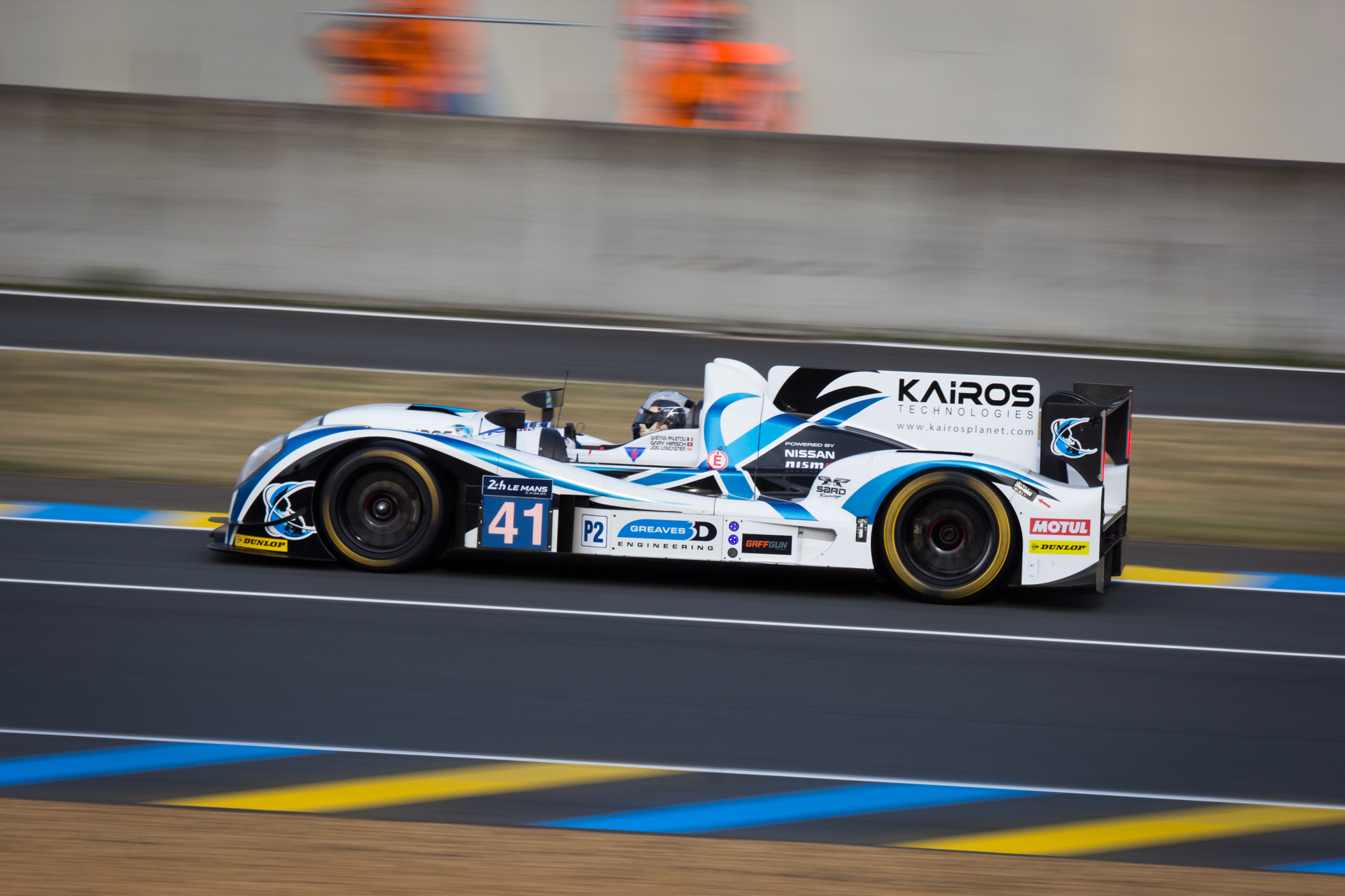
- Lancaster at the 2015 24 Hours of Le Mans
- Nationality: British
- Born: Jon Francis Lancaster; 10 December 1988 (age 37) Leeds, Yorkshire

European Le Mans Series career
- Debut season: 2015
- Current team: JMW Motorsport
- Categorisation: FIA Gold (until 2026); FIA Silver (2027–)
- Car number: 66
- Former teams: Greaves Motorsport, Algarve Pro Racing
- Starts: 16
- Wins: 2
- Poles: 4
- Fastest laps: 0
- Best finish: 1st in 2015

Previous series
- 2012–2015 2011 2011 2009–10 2008 2007 2007 2006–07 2006: GP2 Series; FIA Formula Two Championship; Auto GP; Formula Renault 3.5 Series; Formula 3 Euro Series; Eurocup Formula Renault 2.0; French Formula Renault 2.0; FR2.0 UK Winter Series; Star of Silverstone

Championship titles
- 2015: European Le Mans LMP2

Jon Francis Lancaster (born 10 December 1988 in Leeds) is a British auto racing driver.

== Career ==
=== Early life and karting ===
Lancaster was born on 10 December 1988 in Leeds, Yorkshire. He used to watch Formula One from the age of three and always liked the cars. After getting his full karting licence, Lancaster initially competed at Wombwell Kart Circuit in Barnsley, where he won in his sixth ever race in the Cadet class. The first competitive kart he owned was a basic 100 British pounds kit with engines supplied by Jenson Button’s father, John. Lancaster's father was a former racing mechanic and wanted his son to go karting but also attend Horsforth School. Some years later, he was approached by Paul Lemmens, a talent scout. After having a talk with Lemmens, the talent manager Harald Huysman went to England to see Lancaster and was impressed, saying that he had "everything to be the best in the world". In 2006, as a 16-year-old, Lancaster mainly appeared in the Formula A karting category with Italian team Birel, finishing second in the World Championship and third in the European Championship.

=== Formula Renault 2.0 ===
At the end of 2006, Lancaster moved up to single-seater formula racing, by competing in the Formula Renault 2.0 UK Winter Series with the AKA Lamac team. Lancaster finished sixteenth in the championship, recording a best finish of 8th during round 2 at Brands Hatch.

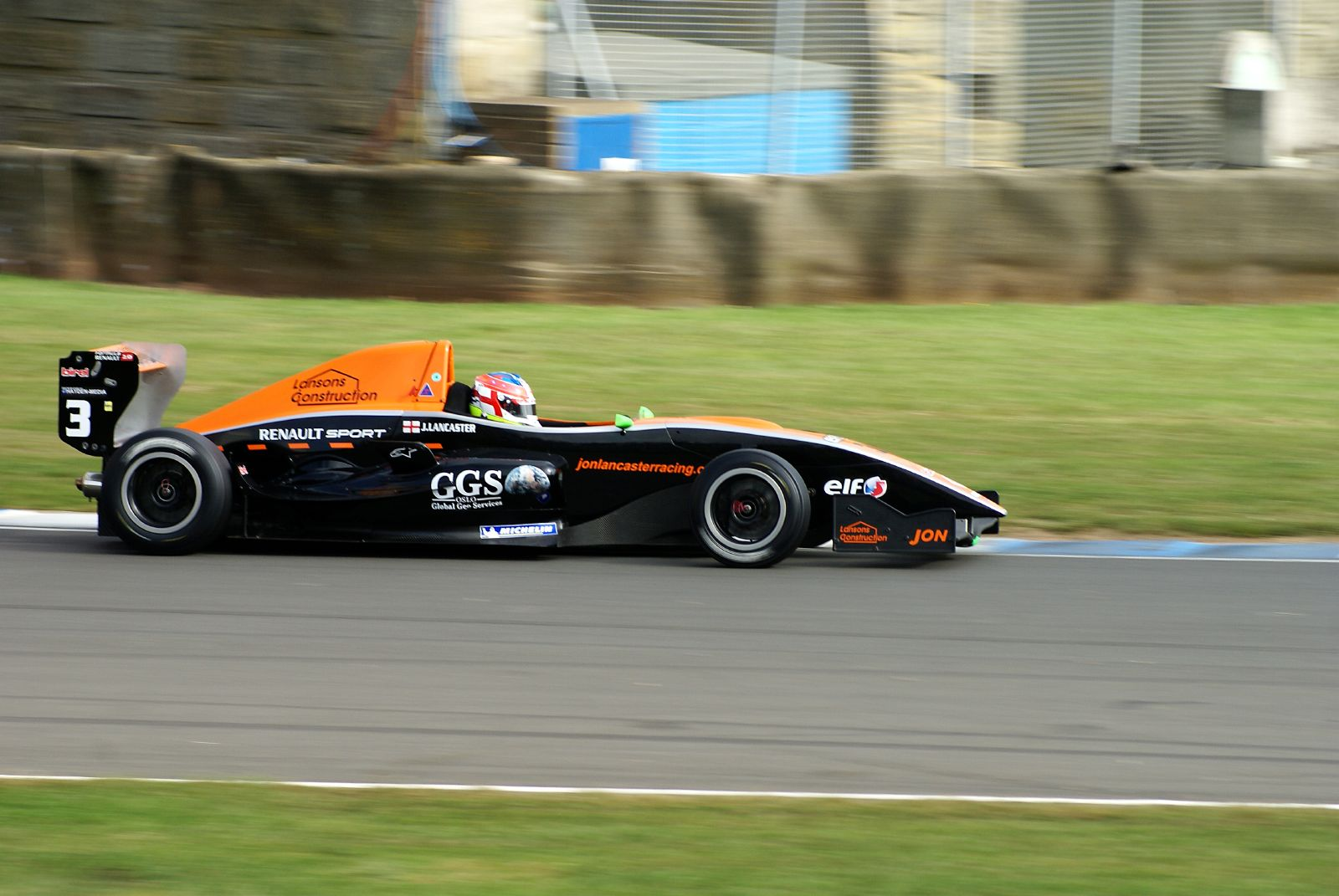
Lancaster driving in the Eurocup Formula Renault 2.0 in 2007.

2007 saw Lancaster move up into the Formula Renault Eurocup driving for SG Formula's second team, SG Drivers Project. Lancaster struggled in the early part of the season, amassing only a second-place finish at the Hungaroring from the first six races, but he improved his form in the last eight races. Four consecutive wins during the last four races gave Lancaster a second place in the championship, behind Brendon Hartley. He dovetailed that European campaign with a season in the French Formula Renault Championship, competing in eleven of the series' thirteen races, finishing sixth with two wins coming at Magny-Cours and Barcelona. After those seasons, he competed for Hitech Racing's Junior team in the Formula Renault UK Winter Series, finishing fourteenth in the championship despite recording a third place at Donington Park in round two.

=== Formula 3 Euro Series ===
Lancaster moved up to the Formula 3 Euro Series for the 2008 season, driving for multiple champions ART Grand Prix. It was a testing year for the Yorkshireman, finishing twelfth in the championship including a win at the Nürburgring. The season wasn't without incident though, as Lancaster survived a horrendous crash during the season-opening race at Hockenheim. In a similar crash to that of Lucas di Grassi in 2005, Lancaster clipped the rear wheel of Jean Karl Vernay's car, while battling for sixth place and flipped over, skating over the tarmac runoff upside-down, before returning to its wheels in the gravel trap. Lancaster would sit out the second race, due to being at hospital for checkups. In non-championship races, Lancaster finished third at Zolder, for ART at the Masters of Formula 3 event and was 11th at the Macau Grand Prix for Manor Motorsport.

=== Formula Renault 3.5 ===
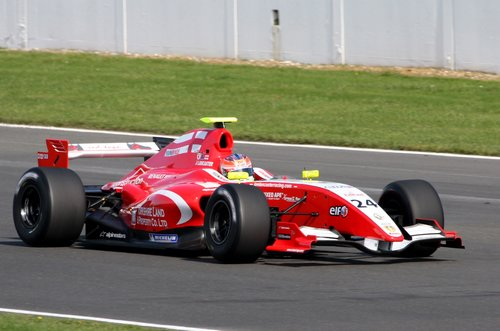
Jon Lancaster – World Series by Renault Formule 3.5 – Fortec Motorsport – Silverstone 2010

Lancaster had been expected to return to the F3 Euroseries for the 2009 season, driving for SG Formula alongside Toyota junior drivers Henkie Waldschmidt and Andrea Caldarelli, but a pre-season disagreement with the team led to Alexandre Marsoin driving for the team. He joined Comtec Racing for the rest of the 2009 Formula Renault 3.5 Series season, taking his first win, during the series' first race at the Autódromo Internacional do Algarve in Portimão. He ended up thirteenth in the championship. He returned to the series in 2010, moving to Fortec Motorsport.

=== Formula Two ===
Lancaster began 2011 without a regular drive, but moved to Formula Two to take part in the Magny-Cours event only, driving with sponsorship from Silver Lining. He scored points in both races in which he competed.

=== Auto GP ===
Lancaster also competed two rounds in Auto GP with Super Nova Racing in 2011. He won at Donington in wet conditions.

=== GP2 Series ===
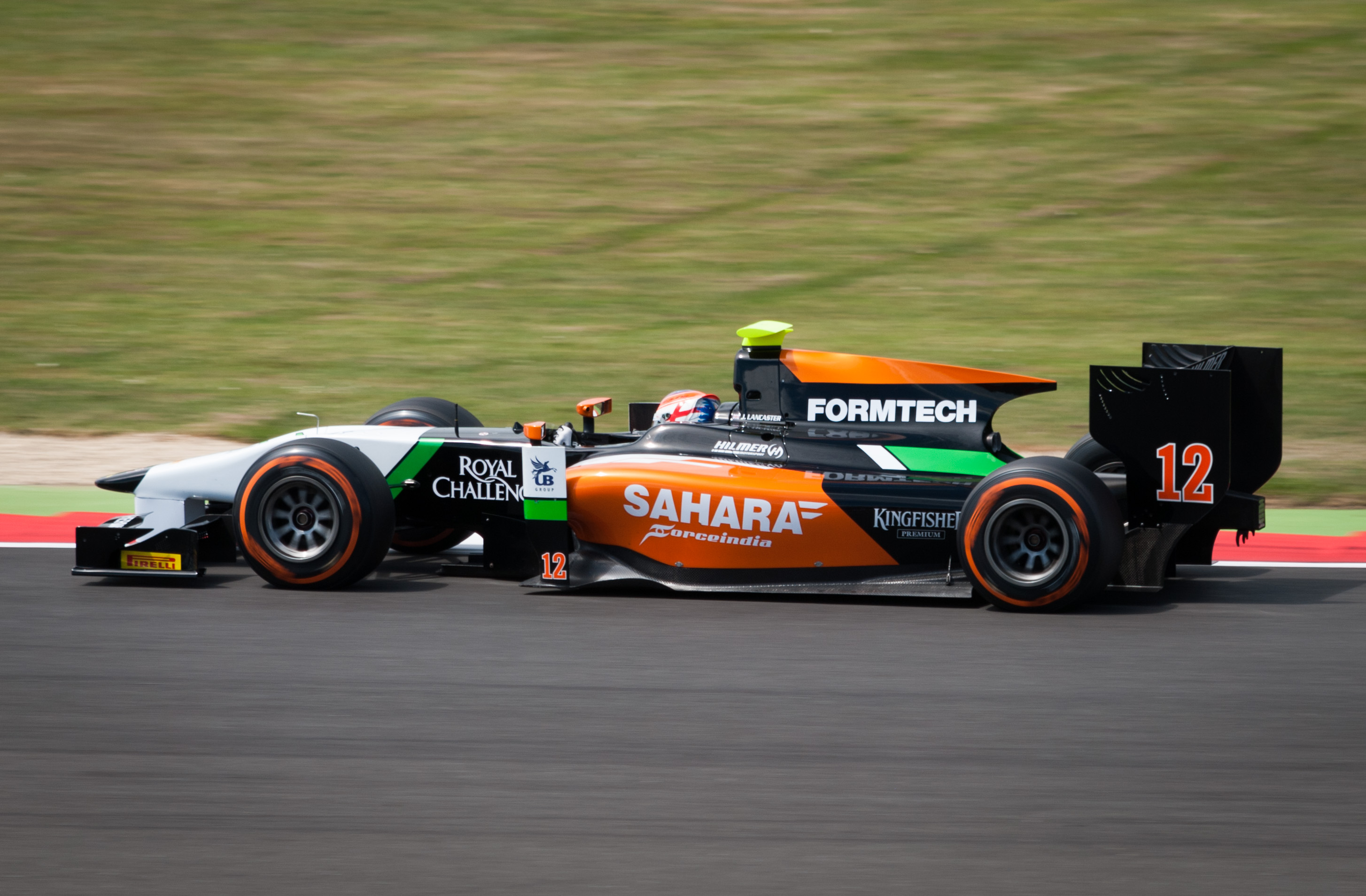
Lancaster at Silverstone during the 2014 GP2 Series season.

Lancaster made his GP2 Series début in 2012. He signed to drive for Ocean Racing Technology with fellow rookie Nigel Melker. He was replaced by Brendon Hartley after the first event of the season for budgetary reasons.

On 8 May 2013, newcomer GP2 team Hilmer announced that Lancaster would drive alongside Formula Renault champion and Sauber test driver Robin Frijns for the third round of the 2013 GP2 season. On his return, he finished on the podium in the feature race, benefitting from a penalty given to Carlin's Jolyon Palmer. With his team mate winning, it was a double podium for Hilmer.

Lancaster went on to take his maiden GP2 win on 30 June 2013 at his home round at Silverstone, the fifth round of the season. He won the sprint race, repeating the British success that weekend along with Sam Bird who also won that weekend the day before in the feature race.

== Racing record ==
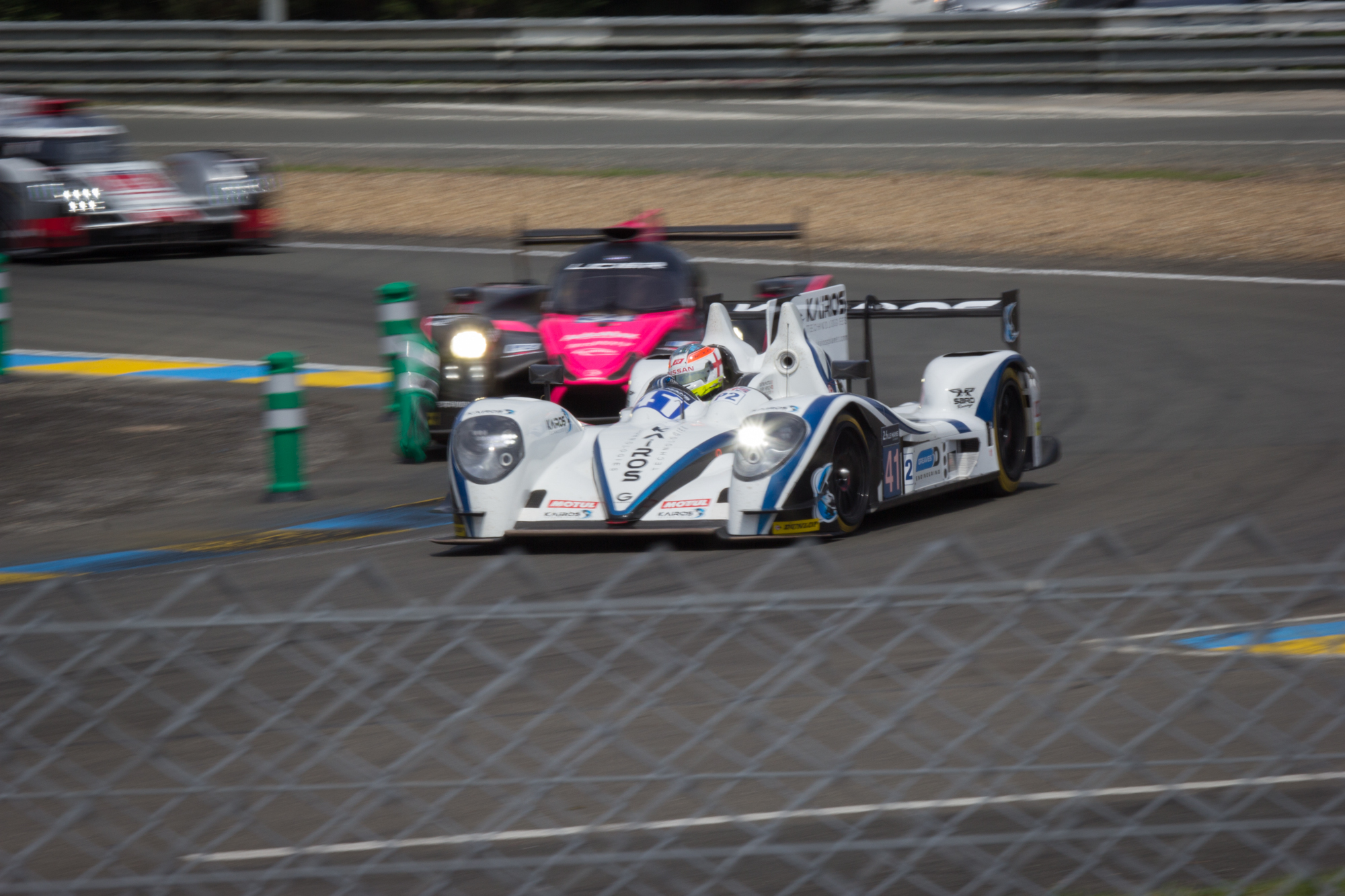
Lancaster competing at the 2015 24 Hours of Le Mans.

=== Career summary ===
| Season | Series | Team | Races | Wins | Poles | F/Laps | Podiums | Points | Position |
|---|---|---|---|---|---|---|---|---|---|
| 2006 | Star of Silverstone | Silverstone Motorsport Academy | 2 | 1 | 0 | ? | 2 | ? | ? |
| 2006 | Formula Renault 2.0 UK Winter Series | AKA Lemac | 4 | 0 | 0 | 0 | 0 | 30 | 16th |
| 2007 | Eurocup Formula Renault 2.0 | SG Drivers Project | 14 | 5 | 4 | 3 | 6 | 102 | **2nd** |
| 2007 | French Formula Renault 2.0 | SG Formula | 10 | 2 | 1 | 1 | 3 | 64 | 6th |
| 2007 | Formula Renault 2.0 UK Winter Series | Hitech Junior Team | 4 | 0 | 0 | 1 | 0 | 33 | 14th |
| 2008 | Formula 3 Euro Series | ART Grand Prix | 19 | 1 | 0 | 1 | 2 | 19 | 12th |
| 2008 | Masters of Formula 3 | ART Grand Prix | 1 | 0 | 0 | 0 | 1 | N/A | **3rd** |
| 2008 | Macau Grand Prix | Manor Motorsport | 1 | 0 | 0 | 0 | 0 | N/A | 11th |
| 2009 | Formula Renault 3.5 Series | Comtec Racing | 12 | 1 | 1 | 2 | 2 | 39 | 13th |
| 2010 | Formula Renault 3.5 Series | Fortec Motorsport | 17 | 0 | 1 | 2 | 1 | 39 | 13th |
| 2011 | FIA Formula Two Championship | MotorSport Vision | 2 | 0 | 0 | 0 | 0 | 14 | 10th |
| 2011 | Auto GP | Super Nova Racing | 4 | 1 | 0 | 2 | 1 | 51 | 11th |
| 2012 | GP2 Series | Ocean Racing Technology | 2 | 0 | 0 | 0 | 0 | 0 | 34th |
| 2012-13 | MRF Challenge Formula 2000 Championship | MRF Racing | 10 | 0 | 1 | 0 | 3 | 91 | 4th |
| 2013 | GP2 Series | Hilmer Motorsport | 16 | 2 | 0 | 2 | 3 | 73 | 11th |
| 2014 | GP2 Series | MP Motorsport | 2 | 0 | 0 | 0 | 0 | 6 | 23rd |
| 2014 | GP2 Series | Hilmer Motorsport | 14 | 0 | 0 | 0 | 0 | 6 | 23rd |
| 2015 | European Le Mans Series - LMP2 | Greaves Motorsport | 5 | 2 | 1 | 0 | 3 | 93 | **1st** |
| 2015 | GP2 Series | Hilmer Motorsport | 2 | 0 | 0 | 0 | 0 | 0 | 32nd |
| 2020 | European Le Mans Series - LMP2 | Algarve Pro Racing | 5 | 0 | 0 | 0 | 0 | 13 | 17th |
| 2021 | GT Cup Championship - Group GTH | Greystone GT | 4 | 0 | 0 | 0 | 0 | 14 | 9th |
| 2022 | GT Cup Championship - Group GTH | Greystone GT | | | | | | | |
| 2022 | Indian Racing League | Chennai Turbo Riders | 6 | 0 | 0 | 1 | 2 | 70 | 9th |
| 2023 | European Le Mans Series - LMGTE | JMW Motorsport | 6 | 0 | 3 | 0 | 1 | 47 | 6th |
| 2023 | GT Cup Championship - Group GTH | Greystone GT | 4 | 3 | 4 | 3 | 4 | 0 | NC† |
| 2023 | McLaren Trophy Europe - Artura Trophy | Greystone GT | | | | | | | |
| 2023 | McLaren Trophy Europe - 570S Trophy | Greystone GT | | | | | | | |
| 2023 | Indian Racing League | Chennai Turbo Riders | 3 | 0 | 0 | 1 | 3 | 83‡ | **2nd‡** |
| 2024 | GT4 European Series - Pro-Am | RAFA Racing Club | 9 | 0 | 0 | 0 | 1 | 29 | 12th |
| 2024 | Indian Racing League | Chennai Turbo Riders | 5 | 3 | 0 | 0 | 3 | 147‡ | **2nd‡** |
| 2025 | Indian Racing League | Hyderabad Blackbirds | | | | | | | |
| 2025 | McLaren Trophy Europe | Greystone GT | | | | | | | |
| 2025 | McLaren Trophy America | RAFA Racing Club | | | | | | | |
| 2025-26 | 24H Series Middle East - 992 | HRT Performance | | | | | | | |
| 2026 | McLaren Trophy America | Greystone GT | | | | | | | |
| 2026 | McLaren Trophy Europe | Greystone GT | | | | | | | |

^{*} Season still in progress.

‡ Team standings.

=== Complete Eurocup Formula Renault 2.0 results ===
(key) (Races in bold indicate pole position; races in italics indicate fastest lap)

| Year | Entrant | 1 | 2 | 3 | 4 | 5 | 6 | 7 | 8 | 9 | 10 | 11 | 12 | 13 | 14 | DC | Points |
|---|---|---|---|---|---|---|---|---|---|---|---|---|---|---|---|---|---|
| 2007 | SG Drivers Project | ZOL; 1 Ret | ZOL; 2; 26 | NÜR; 1 Ret | NÜR; 2; 11 | HUN; 1; 2 | HUN; 2; 25 | **DON**; **1**; 1 | DON; 2; 4 | MAG; 1; 11 | MAG; 2; 13 | **EST**; **1**; 1 | EST; 2; 1 | CAT; 1; 1 | CAT; 2; 1 | 2nd | 102 |

=== Complete Formula 3 Euro Series results ===
(key) (Races in bold indicate pole position) (Races in italics indicate fastest lap)

| Year | Entrant | Chassis | Engine | 1 | 2 | 3 | 4 | 5 | 6 | 7 | 8 | 9 | 10 | 11 | 12 | 13 | 14 | 15 | 16 | 17 | 18 | 19 | 20 | DC | Points |
|---|---|---|---|---|---|---|---|---|---|---|---|---|---|---|---|---|---|---|---|---|---|---|---|---|---|
| 2008 | ART Grand Prix | Dallara F308/070 | Mercedes | HOC; 1 Ret | HOC; 2 DNS | MUG; 1; 23 | MUG; 2; 25 | PAU; 1; 3 | PAU; 2; 7 | NOR; 1; 5 | NOR; 2 Ret | ZAN; 1 Ret | ZAN; 2 Ret | NÜR; 1; 7 | NÜR; 2; 1 | BRH; 1; 9 | BRH; 2; 10 | CAT; 1; 10 | CAT; 2; 22 | BUG; 1; 12 | BUG; 2 Ret | HOC; 1 Ret | HOC; 2; 20 | 12th | 19 |

=== Complete Formula Renault 3.5 Series results ===
(key) (Races in bold indicate pole position) (Races in italics indicate fastest lap)

| Year | Team | 1 | 2 | 3 | 4 | 5 | 6 | 7 | 8 | 9 | 10 | 11 | 12 | 13 | 14 | 15 | 16 | 17 | Pos | Points |
|---|---|---|---|---|---|---|---|---|---|---|---|---|---|---|---|---|---|---|---|---|
| 2009 | Comtec Racing | CAT; 1 | CAT; 2 | SPA; 1 | SPA; 2 | MON; 1 | HUN; 1; 9 | HUN; 2; 10 | SIL; 1; 22 | SIL; 2; 15 | BUG; 1; 8 | **BUG**; **2**; 5 | **ALG**; **1**; 1 | ALG; 2 Ret | NÜR; 1; 9 | NÜR; 2 Ret | ALC; 1; 3 | ALC; 2; 20 | 13th | 39 |
| 2010 | Fortec Motorsport | ALC; 1; 4 | ALC; 2 Ret | SPA; 1; 9 | SPA; 2; 7 | MON; 1; 7 | BRN; 1; 10 | BRN; 2; 7 | MAG; 1; 10 | MAG; 2 Ret | HUN; 1 Ret | HUN; 2; 22 | HOC; 1; 3 | HOC; 2; 8 | **SIL**; **1**; 13 | SIL; 2; 17 | CAT; 1; 14 | CAT; 2; 9 | 13th | 39 |

=== Complete FIA Formula Two Championship results ===
(key) (Races in bold indicate pole position) (Races in italics indicate fastest lap)

| Year | 1 | 2 | 3 | 4 | 5 | 6 | 7 | 8 | 9 | 10 | 11 | 12 | 13 | 14 | 15 | 16 | Pos | Points |
|---|---|---|---|---|---|---|---|---|---|---|---|---|---|---|---|---|---|---|
| 2011 | SIL; 1 | SIL; 2 | MAG; 1; 7 | MAG; 2; 6 | SPA; 1 | SPA; 2 | NÜR; 1 | NÜR; 2 | BRH; 1 | BRH; 2 | SPL; 1 | SPL; 2 | MON; 1 | MON; 2 | CAT; 1 | CAT; 2 | 10th | 14 |

=== Complete Auto GP results ===
(key) (Races in bold indicate pole position) (Races in italics indicate fastest lap)

| Year | Entrant | 1 | 2 | 3 | 4 | 5 | 6 | 7 | 8 | 9 | 10 | 11 | 12 | 13 | 14 | Pos | Points |
|---|---|---|---|---|---|---|---|---|---|---|---|---|---|---|---|---|---|
| 2011 | Super Nova Racing | MNZ; 1 | MNZ; 2 | HUN; 1 | HUN; 2 | BRN; 1; 4 | BRN; 2; 6 | DON; 1; 1 | DON; 2; 4 | OSC; 1 | OSC; 2 | VAL; 1 | VAL; 2 | MUG; 1 | MUG; 2 | 11th | 51 |

=== Complete GP2 Series results ===
(key) (Races in bold indicate pole position) (Races in italics indicate fastest lap)

| Year | Entrant | 1 | 2 | 3 | 4 | 5 | 6 | 7 | 8 | 9 | 10 | 11 | 12 | 13 | 14 | 15 | 16 | 17 | 18 | 19 | 20 | 21 | 22 | 23 | 24 | DC | Points |
|---|---|---|---|---|---|---|---|---|---|---|---|---|---|---|---|---|---|---|---|---|---|---|---|---|---|---|---|
| 2012 | Ocean Racing Technology | SEP; FEA; Ret | SEP; SPR; 17 | BHR1; FEA | BHR1; SPR | BHR2; FEA | BHR2; SPR | CAT; FEA | CAT; SPR | MON; FEA | MON; SPR | VAL; FEA | VAL; SPR | SIL; FEA | SIL; SPR | HOC; FEA | HOC; SPR | HUN; FEA | HUN; SPR | SPA; FEA | SPA; SPR | MNZ; FEA | MNZ; SPR | MRN; FEA | MRN; SPR | 34th | 0 |
| 2013 | Hilmer Motorsport | SEP; FEA | SEP; SPR | BHR; FEA | BHR; SPR | CAT; FEA; 3 | CAT; SPR; 10 | MON; FEA; 12 | MON; SPR; 17 | SIL; FEA; 5 | SIL; SPR; 1 | NÜR; FEA; 7 | NÜR; SPR; 1 | HUN; FEA; 23 | HUN; SPR; 18 | SPA; FEA | SPA; SPR | MNZ; FEA; 13 | MNZ; SPR; 17 | MRN; FEA; 9 | MRN; SPR; 5 | YMC; FEA; Ret | YMC; SPR; Ret | | | 11th | 73 |
| 2014 | MP Motorsport | BHR; FEA; 17 | BHR; SPR; 15 | CAT; FEA | CAT; SPR | MON; FEA | MON; SPR | RBR; FEA | RBR; SPR | | | | | | | | | | | | | | | | | 23rd | 6 |
| 2014 | Hilmer Motorsport | | | | | | | | | SIL; FEA; 22 | SIL; SPR; 13 | HOC; FEA; Ret | HOC; SPR; 5 | HUN; FEA; 17 | HUN; SPR; 16 | SPA; FEA; 19 | SPA; SPR; Ret | MNZ; FEA; 11 | MNZ; SPR; 15 | SOC; FEA; 12 | SOC; SPR; 16 | YMC; FEA; 18 | YMC; SPR; 14 | | | 23rd | 6 |
| 2015 | Hilmer Motorsport | BHR; FEA | BHR; SPR | CAT; FEA | CAT; SPR | MON; FEA | MON; SPR | RBR; FEA | RBR; SPR | SIL; FEA; 16 | SIL; SPR; 17 | HUN; FEA | HUN; SPR | SPA; FEA | SPA; SPR | MNZ; FEA | MNZ; SPR | SOC; FEA | SOC; SPR | BHR; FEA | BHR; SPR | YMC; FEA | YMC; SPR | | | 32nd | 0 |

=== 24 Hours of Le Mans results ===
| Year | Team | Co-Drivers | Car | Class | Laps | Pos. | Class Pos. |
|---|---|---|---|---|---|---|---|
| 2014 | (Switzerland) Race Performance | (Switzerland) Michel Frey (France) Franck Mailleux | Oreca 03R-Judd | LMP2 | 342 | 12th | 8th |
| 2015 | (United Kingdom) Greaves Motorsport | (Switzerland) Gary Hirsch (France) Gaëtan Paletou | Gibson 015S-Nissan | LMP2 | 71 | DNF | DNF |

=== Complete European Le Mans Series results ===
| Year | Entrant | Class | Chassis | Engine | 1 | 2 | 3 | 4 | 5 | 6 | Rank | Points |
|---|---|---|---|---|---|---|---|---|---|---|---|---|
| 2015 | Greaves Motorsport | LMP2 | Gibson 015S | Nissan VK45DE 4.5 L V8 | **SIL**; 1 | IMO; 4 | RBR; 4 | LEC; 1 | EST; 2 | | 1st | 93 |
| 2020 | Algarve Pro Racing | LMP2 | Oreca 07 | Gibson GK428 4.2 L V8 | LEC; 6 | SPA; 12 | LEC; Ret | MNZ; 8 | ALG; 12 | | 17th | 13 |
| 2023 | JMW Motorsport | LMGTE | Ferrari 488 GTE Evo | Ferrari F154CB 3.9 L Turbo V8 | **CAT**; 3 | LEC; 6 | **ARA**; 5 | **SPA**; Ret | ALG; 11 | ALG; 4 | 6th | 47 |

=== Complete Indian Racing League results ===
(key) (Races in bold indicate pole position) (Races in italics indicate fastest lap)

| Year | Franchise | 1 | 2 | 3 | 4 | 5 | 6 | 7 | 8 | 9 | 10 | 11 | 12 | Pos. | Pts |
|---|---|---|---|---|---|---|---|---|---|---|---|---|---|---|---|
| 2022 | Chennai Turbo Riders | HYD1; 1 C | HYD1; 2 C | HYD1; 3 C | IRU1; 1 | IRU1; 2; 3 | IRU1; 3 Ret | IRU2; 1 | IRU2; 2; 2 | IRU2; 3 Ret | HYD2; 1 | HYD2; 2; 4 | HYD2; 3; 4 | 9th | 70 |
| 2023‡ | Chennai Turbo Riders | IRU1; 1; 3 | IRU1; 2 | IRU2; 1 | IRU2; 2; 2 | IRU3; 1; 3 | IRU3; 2 | | | | | | | 2nd | 83 |
| 2024‡ | Chennai Turbo Riders | IRU; 1; 1 | IRU; 2 | IGR; 1 Ret | IGR; 2 | IRU; 1; 1 | IRU; 2 | KAR1; 1; 1 | KAR1; 2 | KAR2; 1; 4 | KAR2; 2 | | | 2nd | 147 |

‡ Standings based on entry points, not individual drivers.

* Season in progress.

== Personal life ==
Lancaster went to Calverley Church of England Primary and Horsforth High School, and is interested in karting, football and cycling. He is also a supporter of English football team, Leeds United.

Sporting positions
| Preceded by Oliver Webb; Nelson Panciatici; Paul-Loup Chatin | European Le Mans Series; LMP2 Champion; 2015; With: Björn Wirdheim & Gary Hirsch | Succeeded by Harry Tincknell; Giedo van der Garde; Simon Dolan |
