= Erik Janiš =

Czech racing driver

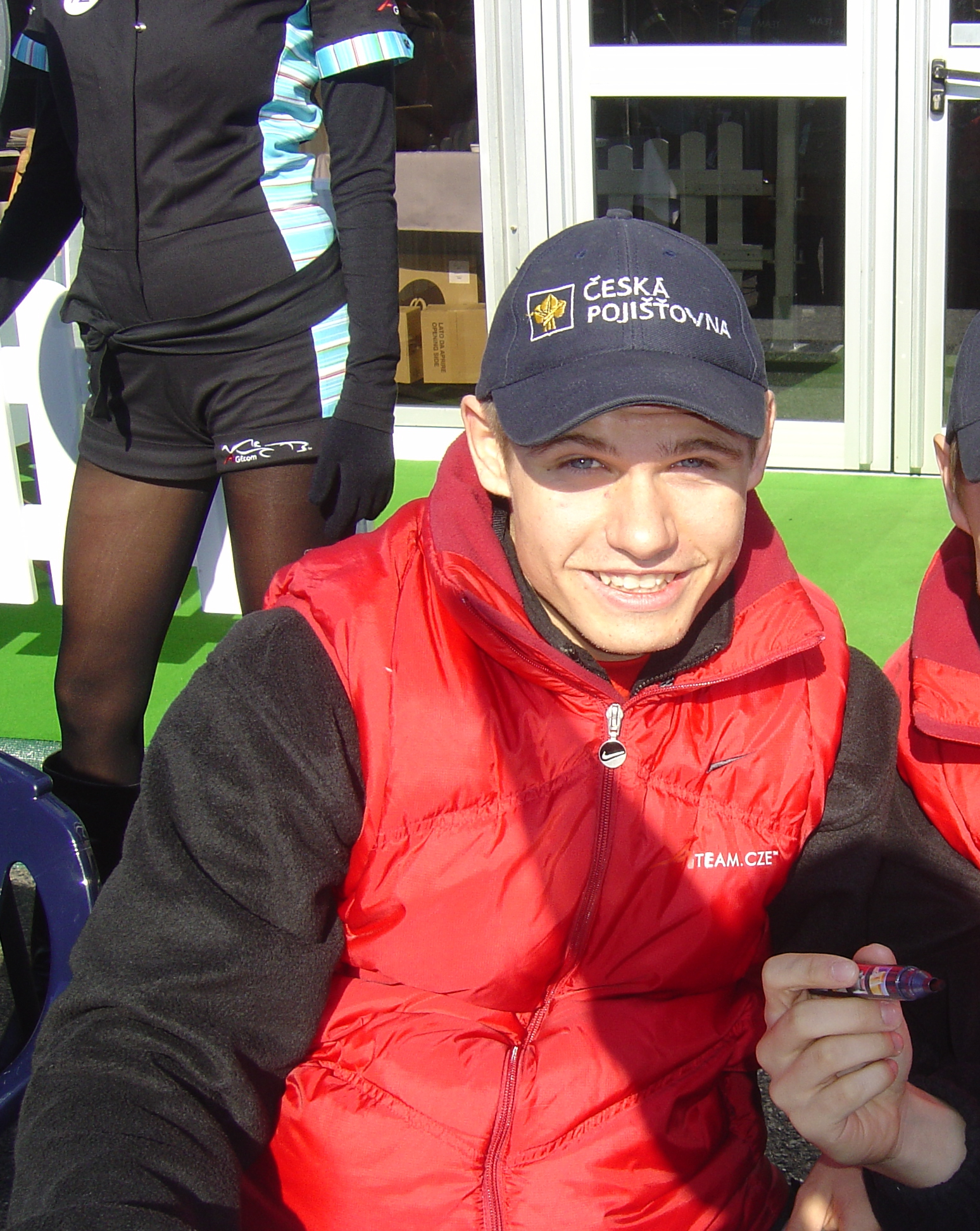
- Janiš in 2007.
- Nationality: (Czech Republic) Czech
- Born: 23 September 1987 (age 39) Olomouc, Czechoslovakia

International Formula Master career
- Debut season: 2007
- Current team: ISR Racing
- Categorisation: FIA Gold (until 2014); FIA Silver (2018–)
- Car number: 20
- Starts: 16
- Wins: 0
- Poles: 0
- Fastest laps: 0
- Best finish: 6th in 2009

Previous series
- 2007-08 2007 2006-2007 2006 2003: A1 Grand Prix; FIA GT3s; C. Pojistovna, Škoda Octavias; Supercopa SEAT Leon Germany; Formula BMW ADAC

Championship titles
- 2007: C. Pojistovna, Škoda Octavias

Erik Janiš (born 23 September 1987) is a Czech racing driver, currently driving in International Formula Master. To his biggest achievements belongs winning rookie rankings in F3 Euro Series. His manager is Antonín Charouz. He is the younger brother of racing driver Jaroslav Janiš.

== Career ==
=== Karting ===
Janiš started his racing career in 1994 in kart racing (Comer 80 class). He drove this Comer 80 class until 1998 when he left it as quadruple Czech Champion. In 1998 Erik also drove Kadet class which he achieved to win in the next season 1999. That season and the next one (2000 season) he also won prestigious class ICA-J 100 in Czech Championship.

The 2001 season was very successful for Janiš. He achieved another win ICA-J 100 kart class and also Czech Go-Kart Championship — Kadet ICA — Junior 100 class. In European ICA 100 championship he was awarded by Green helmet and in his fourteen years he became the youngest winner of Czech Golden wheel award. In the 2002 season, he won kart class ICA-J 100 in Czech Championship for the last time. That season was also his first in Czech Touring Car Championship (Ford Fiesta).

In the 2003 season, Janiš changed for ADAC BMW Junior Cup. After that experience, he returned in go-kart racing (ICC 125 class). In 2004, he achieved fifth place in German Championship and seventh place in European Series. He crowned his successful go-kart career with winning European Championship of ICC 125 class in 2005.

- 2005 : Wins the CIK-FIA European ICC Championship, Intercontinental C
- 2004 : 7th in the CIK-FIA European ICC Championship, Intercontinental C; 5th in the German Karting Championship
- 2002 : Wins the Czech International Karting Championship, ICA-J 100 class; Wins the Czech International Championship of circuit racing, Division 4 (under 1,400 cc (youngest winner in the history); 26th in the European Championship ICA Junior
- 2001 : Wins the Czech International Karting Championship, ICA-J 100 class; Win the European Go-Kart Championship, Kadet Class (Green helmet ranking); Wins the Golden Steering Wheel Award, Karting category (youngest winner in the history)
- 2000 : Wins the Czech International Go-Kart Championship, ICA-J 100 class; 15th in the European Go-Kart Championship, Kadet Class (Green helmet ranking)
- 1999 : Wins the Czech Karting Championship, ICA-J 100 class and Win in cadet Class; Win the Czech Autoclub Award, Karting category
- 1998 : Wins the Czech Karting Championship, Comer 80 class and 9th in cadet class
- 1997 : Wins the Czech Karting Championship, Comer 80 class
- 1996 : Wins the Czech Karting Championship, Comer 80 class
- 1995 : Wins the Czech Karting Championship, Comer 80 class
- 1994 : 9th in the Czech Karting Championship, Comer 80 class

=== Touring car and sports cars ===
Janiš gained first experience in touring cars in 2002 season. In Czech Touring Car Championship — Division 4 up to 1400cc he drove Ford Fiesta, he won and became the youngest champion of Czech Touring Car Championship's history.

In 2006, Janis participated in the Ceska Pojistovna, Škoda Octavia Cup for the first time and he stand up to competition. He won two races and finished sixth overall.

Janiš continued in the Ceska Pojistovna, Škoda Octavia Cup for the 2007 season. That year, he achieved the title two races before the season's finish.

Furthermore, in 2007, Janiš gained experience on foreign circuits. He started in FIA GT3 European Championship (Lamborghini Gallardo GT3. His best result was a second place at Silverstone with Jaromir Jirik. Janiš also drove in International Formula Masters.

=== Formulas ===
In 2007-08, Janiš joined A1 Team Czech Republic to take part in the A1 Grand Prix series as main driver.

In 2008, Janiš raced as a Mercedes-Benz factory pilot, in the Formula Three Euroseries with Mücke Motorsport. In his first season in F3 Euro Series, he won the rookie rankings.

In 2009, Janiš took part in complete testing program of International Formula Master series. However, he missed two opening rounds. He then came back to series with Czech ISR team. At Hungaroring, Hungary, he achieved his first podium result in IFM (third place in Sunday race), then he gained another two third places (Spa and Oschersleben). Janiš appeared also in Le Mans Series with Lamborghini Murcielago R-GT car at Spa, Belgium. Together with team mates Peter Kox and Filip Salaquarda, they finished second in LMGT1 class. Janiš started also in brand new series Lamborghini Super Trofeo with Lamborghini Racing Eastern Europe team.

== Career results ==
Season	Series	Team	Races	Wins	Poles	FLaps	Points	Pos.
2009	International Formula Master	ISR Racing	12	0	0	0	42	6th
2008	Formula Three Euroseries	Mücke Motorsport	20	0	0	0	5	21st
2007-08	A1 Grand Prix	A1 Team Czech Republic	6	0	0	0	1	19th (1)
2007	International Formula Master	ISR Racing	4	0	0	0	2	25th
2007	Ceska Pojistovna, Škoda Octavia Cup			4				1st
2007	FIA GT3 European Championship	S-Berg Racing	4	0			19	6th
2006	Ceska Pojistovna, Škoda Octavia Cup			2				6th
2006	Supercopa SEAT Leon Germany	Team LogiPlus powered by Konrad Motorsport	4	0	0		0	NC
2003	Formula BMW ADAC		12	0	0	0	12	20th

- (1) = Team standings.
