= Formula 3 Euro Series =

Former Single-Seater Racing Championship

- Category: Single seaters
- Country: Europe
- Inaugural season: 2003
- Folded: 2012
- Drivers: 19
- Teams: 8
- Constructors: Dallara
- Engine suppliers: Mercedes; Volkswagen
- Tyre suppliers: Hankook
- Last Drivers' champion: (Spain) Daniel Juncadella
- Last Teams' champion: (Italy) Prema Powerteam
- Official website: f3euroseries.com

The Formula 3 Euro Series was a European-based junior single seater formula for Formula Three chassis that was launched (in its current form) in 2003 as a merger of the French Formula Three Championship and German Formula Three Championship. The Formula Three category, including this championship, is part of the established career ladder up which European drivers progress to the Formula One world championship, the highest form of single seater racing defined by the Fédération Internationale de l'Automobile (FIA), motorsport's world governing body.

Seven time Formula One champion Lewis Hamilton, won the Euro Series drivers' title in 2005. EuroSeries champions Paul di Resta (2006 champion), Romain Grosjean (2007), Nico Hülkenberg (2008), and Jules Bianchi (2009) have driven in Formula One. Other Formula One drivers who also raced in the series include 4-time world champion Sebastian Vettel, Adrian Sutil, Kamui Kobayashi and Nico Rosberg. In 2012, the FIA announced that the series would be discontinued and incorporated into the FIA Formula 3 European Championship in 2013.

== Background ==
The concept of a European Formula Three Championship dates back to 1975, with a five-race series known as the F3 European Cup. Races were held at Monaco, the Nürburgring in Germany, Anderstorp in Sweden, Monza in Italy and Croix-en-Ternois in France. The series title was won by Australian Larry Perkins driving a Ralt-Ford run by Team Cowangie.

In 1976, the Cup evolved into a full-scale, ten-round European F3 Championship, which ran until 1984. Among its champions were notable future Formula One drivers, such as Riccardo Patrese (champion in 1976) Alain Prost (1979), and the late Michele Alboreto (1980).

== Modern era ==
The modern-day Formula 3 Euro Series was inaugurated in 2003 in a collaboration between two of Europe's national governing bodies for motorsport – the Fédération Française du Sport Automobile (FFSA) in France and the Deutscher Motor Sport Bund (DMSB) in Germany.

The new partnership between the FFSA and DMSB spelled the end of national Formula Three in France with the closure of the French Formula Three Championship, but Germany's national championship was effectively supplanted by the creation of the Recaro Formel 3 Cup, though the DMSB initially attempted to block its creation. This lower-status series was formed by ADAC, the F3V (Germany's Formula Three Association) and a few key German teams (such as Bertram Schäfer Racing) that chose not to participate in the new Euro Series. BSR's owner Bertram Schäfer acts as the series' promoter.

The FFSA and DMSB hold joint responsibility for determining the sporting regulations of the Euro Series. The organisation and promotion of the championship is handled by ITR, which performs the same role for the DTM touring car championship.

== Venues ==
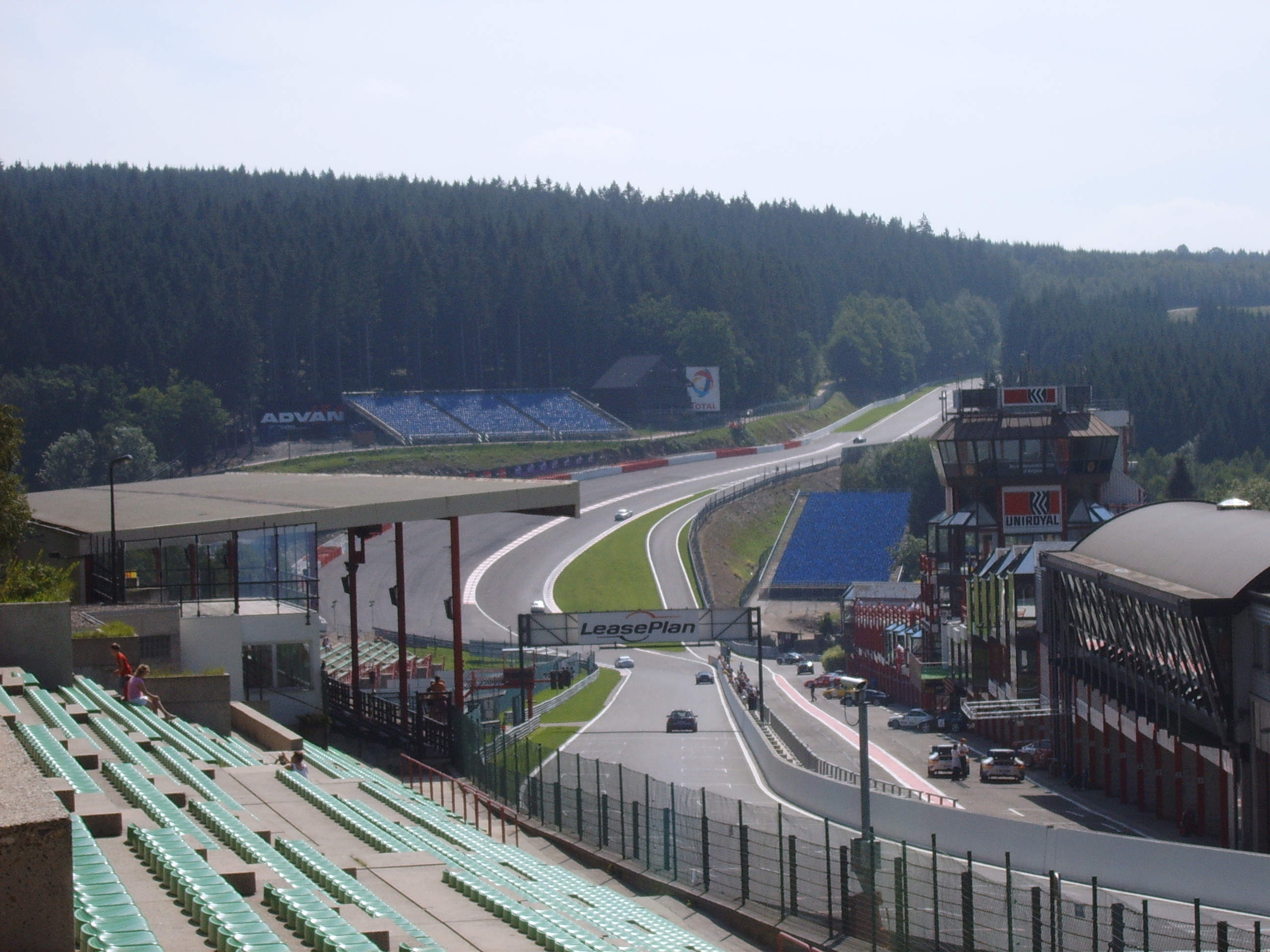
Spa-Francorchamps, Belgium

The championship consists of ten events, each comprising two races, held at a variety of European circuits. Approximately 50–60% of these events occur at circuits in Germany, while the other events are held in various countries, including Great Britain, France, the Netherlands, Italy, Belgium and Spain. Most rounds are shared with the Deutsche Tourenwagen Masters. Notable venues have included Pau and Le Mans in France; Brands Hatch in Britain; Circuit de Catalunya in Spain; Estoril in Portugal; Adria in Italy; and Spa-Francorchamps in Belgium.

From 2004 onwards, the Masters of Formula 3, held at Zandvoort in the Netherlands, was included as a round of the championship. In 2005, the series visited Monaco as a Grand Prix support event, which was the first Formula Three event at Monaco since 1997. This famous motor-racing venue has long-standing associations with Formula Three.

== Technical and sporting regulations ==
The FFSA and DMSB created the new championship around the FIA-sanctioned F3 formula of multiple chassis builders and production-based 4-cylinder 2-litre engines with control supplies of tyres and fuel. As in most F3 championships, the Italian company Dallara is the dominant chassis supplier. It was originally planned to restrict entry to two-car teams, but this requirement was later relaxed. In most Formula Three championships, multiple and single-car entries are common.

Some Formula Three championships, such as the British Formula Three Championship, use a two-tier system to provide an opportunity for low-budget teams and drivers to compete with out-dated chassis specifications. In an effort to minimise costs, Formula Three chassis regulations permit major updates only periodically, with annual updates restricted to minor improvements.

When the Euro Series was launched, restrictions were effectively placed on the teams' choice of chassis specification by opting not to create a lower-tier championship class, and all entrants used the two most recent available specifications.

There is a rookie classification system with a Rookie of the Year title for drivers who have not previously competed in this championship. The Drivers' Trophy was introduced in 2006 to provide a classification system and class title for drivers using chassis of between two and four years old. Eligibility for this "B class" was restricted to drivers who were not more than 22 years old at the start of the season. This class is no longer in use in 2007.

In 2006, testing was restricted to a maximum of 10 days per driver/car, with no testing at race venues, Consequently, teams and drivers have to make the most of the test sessions during race weekends, which had already been reduced from 90 to 60 minutes in 2005.

Tyre usage is restricted to three sets per car for the entire race weekend. There is no limit on the use of wet-weather tyres, but only when they are deemed necessary by race officials. As is the case with most racing disciplines outside Formula One, tyre warming devices are not permitted.

An unauthorised engine change during the course of a race weekend invokes a ten-place penalty on the starting grid.

== Event schedule ==
Each race weekend begins on Friday, with one 60-minute practice session and a qualifying session that decides the starting grid for the first race. There are two races; one of approximately 100–110 km on Saturday and one of approximately 70–80 km on Sunday. The starting times of each session/race vary slightly according to the event schedule at each venue.

With just one qualifying session, the grid for the second race is determined by the results of Race 1. The top eight positions are reversed, giving pole position to the 8th-placed finisher. The single qualifying session and results-based reverse grid system were introduced for the 2006 season: prior to that, the second race had its own qualifying session (with a bonus point for pole position). Drivers who fail to finish the first race occupy the remaining grid positions for Race 2 in the order in which they retired.

== Scoring system ==
In the first race of the weekend, points are awarded to the top eight finishers, with 10 points for a win. One bonus point is awarded for the fastest qualifying time. In addition to the change to a single qualifying session, the points system for the shorter second race was revised in 2006: rather than award full points, it now awards points to the top six finishers, with only six points for a win.

F3 Euro Series points system (2006–2010)
| | 1st | 2nd | 3rd | 4th | 5th | 6th | 7th | 8th |
|---|---|---|---|---|---|---|---|---|
| Race 1 | 10 | 8 | 6 | 5 | 4 | 3 | 2 | 1 |
| Race 2 | 6 | 5 | 4 | 3 | 2 | 1 | | |

== Chassis and engines ==
Three engine suppliers joined the new championship at its inception: Mercedes-Benz, produced by HWA; Opel, produced by Spiess; and Toyota, produced by TOM's. A limited number of teams have competed with Renault and Mugen-Honda powerplants. In the series' first year, HWA-Mercedes supplied engines for seven entrants from three teams. They included ASM Formule 3, with which it subsequently developed a very successful partnership. Since its first Formula Three championship win with ASM in 2004, Mercedes' success has been influential in its growth in popularity among the Euro Series' teams, and has left Spiess-Opel as the only remaining competition. The 2007 season was the latest season to contain an entry with Opel engines, during that season Volkswagen entered the series.

When the series began, all entrants took a conservative approach to their choice of chassis supplier and opted for the established Dallara F302/F303. Alternative chassis have been tested and/or raced on occasions, but for a variety of reasons, they have failed to become established. In the opening round of 2004, a pair of Anglo-Japanese Lola-Dome F106/03 chassis were entered by Coloni Motorsport before the team returned to the Italian F3 Championship. The two chassis builders later parted company, with Lola developing the B05/30 and Dome continuing with the F106. Dome announced its intention to promote its product to Euro Series teams in 2005, though it has not been raced in the series to date. In February 2005, AM-Holzer Rennsport announced its intention to enter a new F3 chassis from the French constructor Mygale – the 05F3. However, Holzer returned to the Dallara F305 by the start of the season.

Meanwhile, the experienced French team Signature branched out into chassis design and developed the SLC. A single SLC-Opel was driven by Fabio Carbone alongside three Dallara F305s in Signature's four-car line-up, but it was not quite as competitive as the team had expected and it returned to an all-Dallara line-up in 2006.

Updated versions of the Lola, Mygale and SLC have since competed in the ATS F3 Cup.

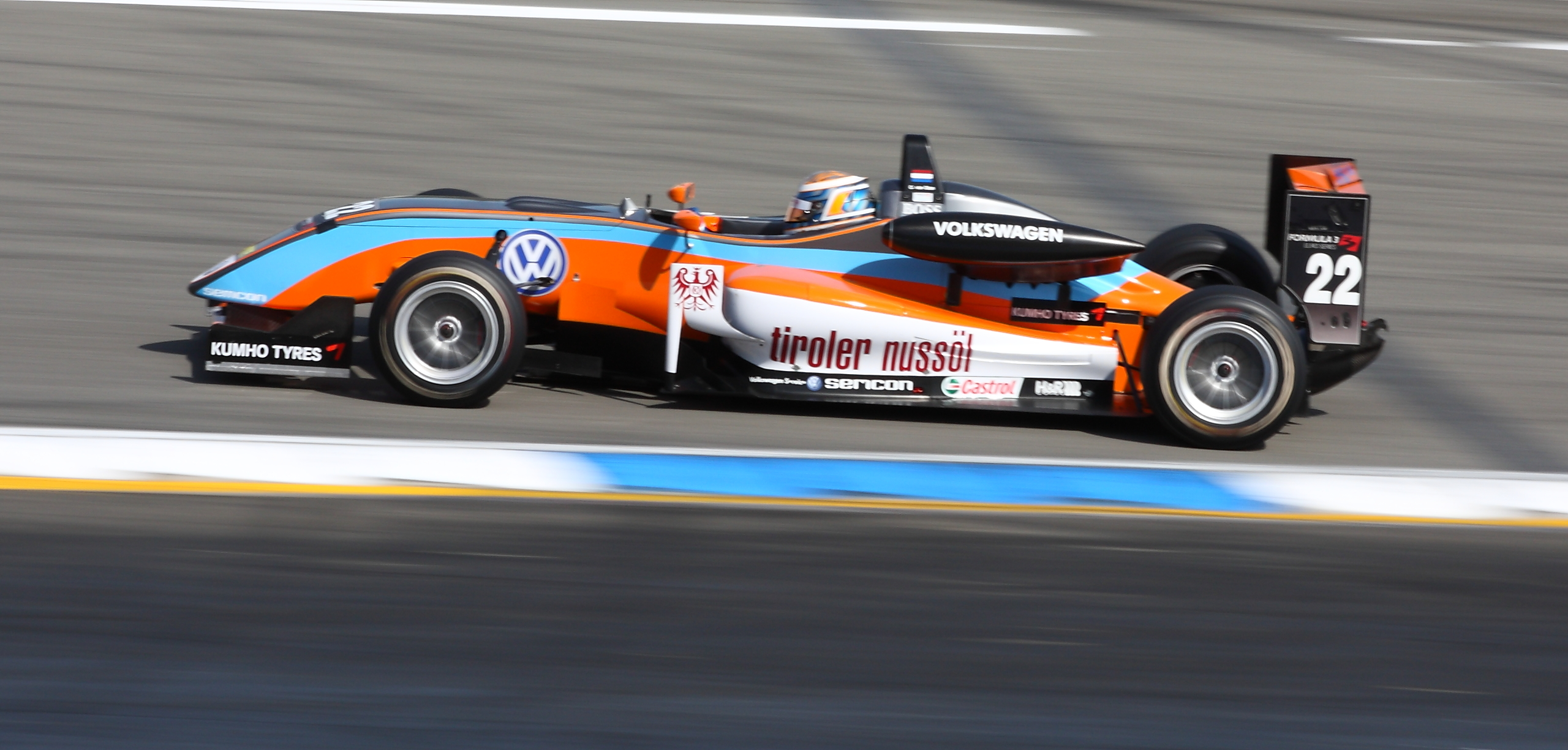
A F3 Euroseries car driven by Carlo van Dam at Hockenheimring.

== Drivers and teams ==
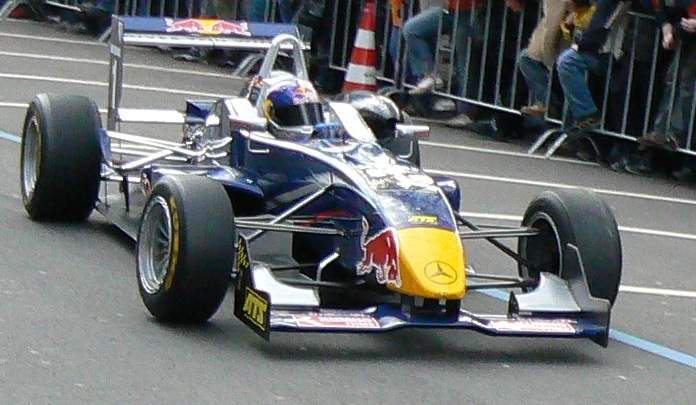
Sebastian Vettel at an F3 Euro Series promotional event in March 2006

Many Euro Series drivers have graduated to the DTM touring car series and GP2 F1 support series, as well as racing and testing roles in Formula One. Lewis Hamilton and Nico Rosberg have gained their places in Formula One via championship-winning seasons in GP2. Hamilton's former Euroseries team-mate, All-Japan F3 champion Adrian Sutil, races for Force India, Sebastian Vettel with Red Bull Renault, and Kazuki Nakajima with Williams and Romain Grosjean Race for Renault F1 for 2009. Others, such as Alexandre Prémat, Jamie Green, Bruno Spengler, and Alexandros Margaritis compete in the DTM.

== Championship seasons ==
=== 2003 season ===
The inaugural season attracted a strong entry list, comprising the best teams from the merged French and German championships. The first Euro Series drivers' champion was Ryan Briscoe of Australia, driving a Dallara-Opel F303 run by Prema Powerteam, based in Italy. It was a closely fought season, in which race wins were shared between eight drivers, six teams, and three engine manufacturers. Briscoe was, at that time, a protégé of Toyota's driver development program and had already tested one of its Formula One cars at the age of 20. Three of the drivers in the 2003 championship – Robert Kubica, Timo Glock and Nico Rosberg – have competed in Formula One.

=== 2004 season ===
Briscoe's would be the only championship title to date for a driver using an Opel-powered car, as the Mercedes-backed ASM Formule 3 rose to prominence in 2004. Its first drivers' title was provided by Jamie Green of Great Britain. He began to dominate the championship as the season progressed, eventually achieving seven race wins and a further seven podium finishes. He graduated to the DTM with the backing of Mercedes, and has since established himself in its factory team.

=== 2005 season ===
ASM and Mercedes further improved on their performances of the previous season. The championship was dominated by Britain's Lewis Hamilton, who had been a protégé of the McLaren-Mercedes Formula One team. He achieved a record-setting 15 race wins from 20 starts, thirteen pole positions and ten fastest laps. Hamilton graduated to GP2, winning that championship in his rookie year. He subsequently went on to become the youngest ever F1 world champion in 2008 with McLaren, winning the title in his second season. Also competing in 2005 was Red Bull Racing driver Sebastian Vettel, who finished the season as the highest-placed rookie.

=== 2006 season ===
The status quo remained unchanged in the 2006 championship. For the third year in succession, the teams' title was won by ASM and the champion driver – Paul di Resta – was using one of its Mercedes-powered Dallaras. Sebastian Vettel joined di Resta and two other drivers in ASM's expanded line-up, and finished the year as the championship's runner-up. The use of the reverse-grid system contributed to a much closer championship and a record number of winners, with eleven different drivers reaching the top step of the podium. Mercedes gave di Resta a placement in the DTM and went on to race for Force India Formula One Team.

=== 2007 season ===
The 2007 drivers' championship was won by Romain Grosjean, with his closest challenger Sébastien Buemi.

== Champions ==
=== Drivers' ===
| Season | Driver | Team | Engine | Poles | Wins | Podiums | Fastest laps | Points | Clinched | Margin | Ref |
|---|---|---|---|---|---|---|---|---|---|---|---|
| 2003 | (Australia) Ryan Briscoe | (Italy) Prema Powerteam | Opel | 4 | 8 | 10 | 5 | 110 | Race 17 of 20 | 31 | |
| 2004 | (United Kingdom) Jamie Green | (France) ASM Formule 3 | Mercedes | 5 | 7 | 14 | 8 | 139 | Race 15 of 20 | 51 | |
| 2005 | (United Kingdom) Lewis Hamilton | (France) ASM Formule 3 | Mercedes | 4 | 8 | 10 | 5 | 172 | Race 15 of 20 | 78 | |
| 2006 | (United Kingdom) Paul di Resta | (France) ASM Formule 3 | Mercedes | 5 | 5 | 9 | 1 | 86 | Race 19 of 20 | 11 | |
| 2007 | (France) Romain Grosjean | (France) ASM Formule 3 | Mercedes | 4 | 6 | 12 | 7 | 106 | Race 19 of 20 | 11 | |
| 2008 | (Germany) Nico Hülkenberg | (France) ART Grand Prix | Mercedes | 6 | 7 | 8 | 6 | 85 | Race 17 of 20 | 35.5 | |
| 2009 | (France) Jules Bianchi | (France) ART Grand Prix | Mercedes | 6 | 9 | 12 | 7 | 114 | Race 17 of 20 | 39 | |
| 2010 | (Italy) Edoardo Mortara | (France) Signature | Volkswagen | 5 | 7 | 11 | 6 | 101 | Race 15 of 18 | 25 | |
| 2011 | (Spain) Roberto Merhi | (Italy) Prema Powerteam | Mercedes | 8 | 11 | 10 | 10 | 406 | Race 23 of 27 | 121 | |
| 2012 | (Spain) Daniel Juncadella | (Italy) Prema Powerteam | Mercedes | 5 | 4 | 9 | 5 | 240 | Race 24 of 24 | 14 | |

=== Teams' ===
| Season | Team | Engine | Poles | Wins | Podiums | Fastest laps | Points | Clinched | Margin | Ref |
|---|---|---|---|---|---|---|---|---|---|---|
| 2005 | (France) ASM Formule 3 | Mercedes | 14 | 17 | 22 | 13 | 261 | Race 15 of 20 | 158 | |
| 2006 | (France) ASM Formule 3 | Mercedes | 8 | 10 | 25 | 7 | 197 | Race 18 of 20 | 50 | |
| 2007 | (France) ASM Formule 3 | Mercedes | 7 | 11 | 30 | 10 | 229 | Race 15 of 20 | 110 | |
| 2008 | (France) ART Grand Prix | Mercedes | 9 | 11 | 18 | 12 | 159 | Race 17 of 20 | 48.5 | |
| 2009 | (France) ART Grand Prix | Mercedes | 8 | 9 | 20 | 8 | 183 | Race 19 of 20 | 20 | |
| 2010 | (France) Signature | Volkswagen | 7 | 8 | 25 | 8 | 193 | Race 16 of 18 | 45 | |
| 2011 | (Italy) Prema Powerteam | Mercedes | 12 | 15 | 23 | 13 | 693 | Race 25 of 27 | 123 | |
| 2012 | (Italy) Prema Powerteam | Mercedes | 9 | 13 | 30 | 14 | 609.5 | Race 21 of 24 | 168 | |

=== Rookies' ===
From 2003 to 2008 the result of the championship was decided by different standings wins and points of the rookie standings are present in brackets, from 2009 to 2012 the result of best rookie was decided by the highest place in the overall driver standings.

| Season | Driver | Team | Engine | Poles | Wins (rookie) | Podiums | Fastest laps | Points (rookie) | Clinched | Margin |
|---|---|---|---|---|---|---|---|---|---|---|
| 2003 | (Austria) Christian Klien | (Germany) Mücke Motorsport | Mercedes | 6 | 3 (8) | 8 | 3 | 89 (134) | Race 17 of 20 | 132 |
| 2004 | (France) Franck Perera | (Italy) Prema Powerteam | Opel | 0 | 0 (6) | 4 | 0 | 48 (147) | Race 19 of 20 | 17 |
| 2005 | (Germany) Sebastian Vettel | (Germany) ASL Mücke Motorsport | Mercedes | 0 | 0 (8) | 6 | 1 | 63 (157) | Race 18 of 20 | 25 |
| 2006 | (Japan) Kamui Kobayashi | (France) ASM Formule 3 | Mercedes | 0 | 0 (11) | 3 | 1 | 34 (119) | Race 15 of 20 | 22 |
| 2007 | (Italy) Edoardo Mortara | (France) Signature-Plus | Mercedes | 0 | 2 (7) | 4 | 2 | 37 (99) | Race 19 of 20 | 6 |
| 2008 | (Czech Republic) Erik Janiš | (Germany) Mücke Motorsport | Mercedes | 0 | 0 (2) | 0 | 0 | 5 (78) | Race 20 of 20 | 1.5 |
| 2009 | (Finland) Valtteri Bottas | (France) ART Grand Prix | Mercedes | 2 | 0 | 3 | 1 | 62 | Race 19 of 20 | 8 |
| 2010 | (Portugal) António Félix da Costa | (Germany) Motopark Academy | Volkswagen | 0 | 3 | 4 | 2 | 40 | Race 17 of 18 | 5 |
| 2011 | (Netherlands) Nigel Melker | (Germany) Mücke Motorsport | Mercedes | 2 | 2 | 9 | 4 | 251 | Race 22 of 27 | 22 |
| 2012 | (Germany) Pascal Wehrlein | (Germany) Mücke Motorsport | Mercedes | 1 | 1 | 10 | 1 | 226 | Race 22 of 24 | 54 |

=== Nations' ===
| Season | Nation | Poles | Wins | Podiums | Fastest laps | Points | Clinched | Margin |
|---|---|---|---|---|---|---|---|---|
| 2003 | France | 6 | 1 | 12 | 2 | 166 | Race 18 of 20 | 38 |
| 2004 | France | 10 | 9 | 24 | 8 | 256 | Race 19 of 20 | 45 |
| 2005 | Great Britain | 16 | 16 | 14 | 12 | 237 | Race 18 of 20 | 67 |
| 2006 | Japan | 0 | 2 | 12 | 6 | 124 | Race 18 of 20 | 24 |
| 2007 | France | 4 | 7 | 18 | 10 | 176 | Race 16 of 20 | 83 |
| 2008 | France | 2 | 3 | 16 | 3 | 140 | Race 19 of 20 | 21 |
| 2009 | France | 6 | 11 | 16 | 9 | 155 | Race 19 of 20 | 47 |
| 2010 | Italy | 5 | 7 | 11 | 6 | 96 | Race 17 of 18 | 6 |
| 2011 | Spain | 12 | 15 | 24 | 13 | 686 | Race 22 of 27 | 251 |
| 2012 | Germany | 3 | 2 | 15 | 2 | 423 | Race 24 of 24 | 40 |

=== Drivers' Trophy ===
| Season | Driver | Team | Engine | Poles | Wins | Podiums | Fastest laps | Points | Clinched | Margin |
|---|---|---|---|---|---|---|---|---|---|---|
| 2006 | (Germany) Julian Theobald | (Germany) SMS Seyffarth Motorsport | Mercedes | 2 | 6 | 10 | 5 | 73 | Race 19 of 20 | 6 |

== See also ==
- Formula Three
- FIA Formula 3 European Championship
- FIA European Formula Three Cup
- GP2 Series
