= 2008 Formula 3 Euro Series =

The 2008 Formula 3 Euro Series season was the sixth championship year of Europe's premier Formula Three series. The season was dominated by 21-year-old German Nico Hülkenberg, who won seven of the season's ten feature races amassing 76 of his total of 85 championship points on Saturday afternoons. He won the championship by 35.5 points from early frontrunner Edoardo Mortara as the 2007's rookie cup winner's season somewhat tailed off after the Norisring, scoring just 9.5 points in the final twelve races compared to Hülkenberg's 60. Jules Bianchi's strong finish to the season, including a win in the final race at Hockenheim and coupled with Renger van der Zande's fifth place and Mika Mäki's ninth place, it allowed the 2008 Ultimate Masters winner to finish third in the championship, a point ahead of both van der Zande and Mäki.

== Drivers and teams ==
2008 Entry List
Team	No	Driver	Rookie	Chassis (Note: All drivers competed in Dallara chassis; model listed.)	Engine	Rounds
(France) ART Grand Prix	1	(Germany) Nico Hülkenberg		F308/009	Mercedes	All
(France) ART Grand Prix	2	(United Kingdom) James Jakes		F308/049	Mercedes	All
(France) ART Grand Prix	24	(France) Jules Bianchi	R	F308/026	Mercedes	All
(France) ART Grand Prix	25	(United Kingdom) Jon Lancaster	R	F308/070	Mercedes	All
(Germany) Mücke Motorsport	3	(Germany) Christian Vietoris		F308/050	Mercedes	All
(Germany) Mücke Motorsport	4	(Czech Republic) Erik Janiš	R	F308/042	Mercedes	All
(Germany) Mücke Motorsport	26	(Finland) Mika Mäki	R	F308/005	Mercedes	All
(United Kingdom) Manor Motorsport	5	(United Kingdom) Sam Bird		F308/036	Mercedes	All
(United Kingdom) Manor Motorsport	6	(Republic of Ireland) Niall Breen		F308/001	Mercedes	1–8
(United Kingdom) Manor Motorsport	28	(Japan) Koudai Tsukakoshi		F308/059	Mercedes	All
(United Kingdom) Manor Motorsport	29	(Japan) Kazuya Oshima		F308/046	Mercedes	All
(France) Signature-Plus	7	(Italy) Edoardo Mortara		F308/073	Volkswagen	All
(France) Signature-Plus	8	(France) Franck Mailleux		F308/057	Volkswagen	All
(France) Signature-Plus	30	(France) Jean-Karl Vernay		F308/033	Volkswagen	All
(France) Signature-Plus	31	(Monaco) Stefano Coletti	R	F308/011	Volkswagen	1–2
(France) Signature-Plus	35	(Canada) Robert Wickens	R	F308/011	Volkswagen	3–6, 8–10
(Italy) Prema Powerteam	9	(Netherlands) Renger van der Zande		F308/015	Mercedes	All
(Italy) Prema Powerteam	10	(United States) Charlie Kimball		F308/047	Mercedes	1–3
(Italy) Prema Powerteam	23	(Spain) Dani Clos		F308/031	Mercedes	All
(Italy) Prema Powerteam	31	(Monaco) Stefano Coletti	R	F308/047	Mercedes	4–10
(Switzerland) Jo Zeller Racing	14	(Germany) Michael Klein		F308/044	Mercedes	1–4
(Switzerland) Jo Zeller Racing	19	(France) Tom Dillmann		F308/044	Mercedes	6
(Austria) HBR Motorsport	15	(Spain) Daniel Campos-Hull	R	F308/052	Mercedes	All
(Austria) HBR Motorsport	27	(Lebanon) Basil Shaaban		F308/021	Mercedes	All
(Italy) R.C. Motorsport powered by Volkswagen	17	(Germany) Maximilian Götz		F308/077	Volkswagen	1–4
(Italy) R.C. Motorsport powered by Volkswagen	18	(United Kingdom) Martin Plowman	R	F308/051	Volkswagen	1–7
(Italy) R.C. Motorsport powered by Volkswagen	32	(Germany) Jens Klingmann	R	F308/032	Volkswagen	All
(Italy) R.C. Motorsport powered by Volkswagen	33	(China) Cong Fu Cheng		F308/010	Volkswagen	3–10
(Italy) R.C. Motorsport powered by Volkswagen	41	(New Zealand) Brendon Hartley		F308/077	Volkswagen	6
(Italy) R.C. Motorsport powered by Volkswagen	43	(Germany) Peter Elkmann		F308/051	Volkswagen	8
(Italy) R.C. Motorsport powered by Volkswagen	44	(France) Nelson Panciatici		F308/051	Volkswagen	9
(Italy) R.C. Motorsport powered by Volkswagen	45	(Belgium) Frédéric Vervisch		F308/051	Volkswagen	10
(France) SG Formula	19	(France) Tom Dillmann		F308/014	Mercedes	1–3
(France) SG Formula	20	(Netherlands) Henkie Waldschmidt	R	F308/029	Mercedes	All
(France) SG Formula	21	(France) Richard Philippe	R	F308/014	Mercedes	8–10
(France) SG Formula	34	(France) Yann Clairay		F308/072	Mercedes	All
(France) SG Formula	40	(Australia) Daniel Ricciardo	R	F308/014	Mercedes	6
(United Kingdom) Carlin Motorsport	21	(France) Richard Philippe	R	F308/055	Mercedes	1–7
(United Kingdom) Carlin Motorsport	22	(Venezuela) Rodolfo González		F308/074	Mercedes	1–9
(United Kingdom) Carlin Motorsport	41	(New Zealand) Brendon Hartley		F308/055	Mercedes	8–10
(United Kingdom) Carlin Motorsport	46	(United Kingdom) Oliver Oakes		F308/074	Mercedes	10
(France) Barazi-Epsilon	42	(Monaco) Stéphane Richelmi	R	F308/094	Mercedes	8–10

Icon	Legend
R	Rookie

=== Driver changes ===
Changed Teams

- Yann Clairay: Signature-Plus → SG Formula
- Dani Clos: Signature-Plus → Prema Powerteam
- Tom Dillmann: ASM Formule 3 → SG Formula
- James Jakes: Manor Motorsport → ART Grand Prix
- Franck Mailleux: Manor Motorsport → Signature-Plus

Entering/Re-Entering Formula 3 Euro Series

- Jules Bianchi: French Formula Renault Championship & Eurocup Formula Renault 2.0 (SG Formula) → ART Grand Prix
- Sam Bird: British Formula 3 Championship (Carlin Motorsport) → Manor Motorsport
- Niall Breen: British Formula 3 Championship (Carlin Motorsport) → Manor Motorsport
- Daniel Campos-Hull: Formula BMW ADAC (Eifelland Racing) → HBR Motorsport
- Cong Fu Cheng: British Formula 3 Championship National Class (Performance Racing Europe AB) → RC Motorsport
- Stefano Coletti: Italian Formula Renault Championship & Eurocup Formula Renault 2.0 (Epsilon Euskadi) → Signature-Plus
- Peter Elkmann: Sabbatical → RC Motorsport
- Rodolfo González: British Formula 3 Championship (T-Sport) → Carlin Motorsport
- Erik Janiš: FIA GT3 European Championship (S-Berg Racing) → Mücke Motorsport
- Brendon Hartley: Italian Formula Renault Championship & Eurocup Formula Renault 2.0 (Epsilon Red Bull Team) → RC Motorsport
- Charlie Kimball: Formula Renault 3.5 Series (Victory Engineering) → Prema Powerteam
- Jens Klingmann: Formula BMW ADAC (Eifelland Racing) → RC Motorsport
- Michael Klein: German Formula Three Championship Trophy Class (HS Technik Motorsport) → Jo Zeller Racing
- Jon Lancaster: French Formula Renault Championship & Eurocup Formula Renault 2.0 (SG Formula) → ART Grand Prix
- Mika Mäki: Italian Formula Renault Championship & Eurocup Formula Renault 2.0 (Epsilon Red Bull Team) → Mücke Motorsport
- Oliver Oakes: Formula Renault 2.0 Northern European Cup & Eurocup Formula Renault 2.0 (Motopark Academy) → Carlin Motorsport
- Kazuya Oshima: All-Japan Formula Three Championship (Toyota Team Tom's) → Manor Motorsport
- Nelson Panciatici: French Formula Renault Championship & Eurocup Formula Renault 2.0 (SG Formula) → RC Motorsport
- Richard Philippe: Formula Renault 3.5 Series (Fortec Motorsport) → Carlin Motorsport
- Martin Plowman: Italian Formula Renault Championship & Eurocup Formula Renault 2.0 (Prema Powerteam) → RC Motorsport
- Stéphane Richelmi: Italian Formula Renault Championship & Eurocup Formula Renault 2.0 (Thierry Boutsen Racing) → Barazi-Epsilon
- Daniel Ricciardo: Italian Formula Renault Championship & Eurocup Formula Renault 2.0 (RP Motorsport) → SG Formula
- Koudai Tsukakoshi: All-Japan Formula Three Championship (Honda Team Real) → Manor Motorsport
- Christian Vietoris: German Formula Three Championship (Josef Kaufmann Racing) → Mücke Motorsport
- Frédéric Vervisch: German Formula Three Championship (JB Motorsport) → RC Motorsport
- Henkie Waldschmidt: Italian Formula Renault Championship & Eurocup Formula Renault 2.0 (Prema Powerteam) → SG Formula
- Robert Wickens: Atlantic Championship (Red Bull/Team Forsythe) → Signature-Plus

Leaving Formula 3 Euro Series

- Sergey Afanasyev: HBR Motorsport → International Formula Master (JD Motorsport)
- Cyndie Allemann: Manor Motorsport → Firestone Indy Lights (American Spirit Racing)
- Sébastien Buemi: ASL Mücke Motorsport → GP2 Series (Trust Team Arden)
- Yelmer Buurman: Manor Motorsport → GP2 Series (Trust Team Arden)
- Carlo van Dam: RC Motorsport → All-Japan Formula Three Championship (Petronas Team Tom's)
- Michael Devaney: Ultimate Motorsport → British Formula 3 Championship (Ultimate Motorsport)
- Romain Grosjean: ASM Formule 3 → GP2 Series (ART Grand Prix)
- Esteban Guerrieri: Ultimate Motorsport → Formula Renault 3.5 Series (Ultimate Signature)
- Euan Hankey: HS Technik Motorsport → Sabbatical
- Michael Herck: Bas Leinders Junior Racing Team → GP2 Series (David Price Racing)
- Marco Holzer: AM-Holzer Rennsport → Porsche Carrera Cup Germany (UPS Porsche Junior Team)
- Kamui Kobayashi: ASM Formule 3 → GP2 Series (DAMS)
- Michael Patrizi: Prema Powerteam → V8 Supercars (Ford Rising Stars Racing)
- Edoardo Piscopo: ASL Mücke Motorsport → Italian Formula Three Championship (Team Ghinzani)
- Filip Salaquarda: HBR Motorsport → International Formula Master (Team ISR)
- Tim Sandtler: Jo Zeller Racing → International Formula Master (Team ISR)
- Harald Schlegelmilch: HS Technik Motorsport → International Formula Master (Trident Racing)
- Jonathan Summerton: RC Motorsport → Atlantic Championship (Newman Wachs Racing)

== Calendar ==
Round		Circuit	Date	Pole position	Fastest lap	Winning driver	Winning team	Winning rookie
1	R1	(Germany) Hockenheimring	12 April	(Germany) Nico Hülkenberg	(Finland) Mika Mäki	(Finland) Mika Mäki	(Germany) Mücke Motorsport	(Finland) Mika Mäki
1	R2	(Germany) Hockenheimring	13 April		(Spain) Dani Clos	(Netherlands) Renger van der Zande	(Italy) Prema Powerteam	(Czech Republic) Erik Janiš
2	R1	(Italy) Mugello Circuit	3 May	(Germany) Nico Hülkenberg	(Germany) Christian Vietoris	(Germany) Nico Hülkenberg	(France) ART Grand Prix	(France) Jules Bianchi
2	R2	(Italy) Mugello Circuit	4 May		(Finland) Mika Mäki	(Finland) Mika Mäki	(Germany) Mücke Motorsport	(Finland) Mika Mäki
3	R1	(France) Pau Circuit	31 May	(United Kingdom) James Jakes	(United Kingdom) James Jakes	(United Kingdom) James Jakes	(France) ART Grand Prix	(United Kingdom) Jon Lancaster
3	R2	(France) Pau Circuit	1 June		(Venezuela) Rodolfo González	(Italy) Edoardo Mortara	(France) Signature-Plus	(United Kingdom) Jon Lancaster
4	R1	(Germany) Norisring, Nuremberg	28 June	(Germany) Nico Hülkenberg	(Germany) Nico Hülkenberg	(Germany) Nico Hülkenberg	(France) ART Grand Prix	(United Kingdom) Jon Lancaster
4	R2	(Germany) Norisring, Nuremberg	29 June		(United Kingdom) James Jakes	(Germany) Christian Vietoris	(Germany) Mücke Motorsport	(Canada) Robert Wickens
5	R1	(Netherlands) Circuit Park Zandvoort	12 July	(Germany) Nico Hülkenberg	(Germany) Nico Hülkenberg	(Germany) Nico Hülkenberg	(France) ART Grand Prix	(Finland) Mika Mäki
5	R2	(Netherlands) Circuit Park Zandvoort	13 July		(Germany) Nico Hülkenberg	(Netherlands) Renger van der Zande	(Italy) Prema Powerteam	(Finland) Mika Mäki
6	R1	(Germany) Nürburgring	26 July	(Germany) Christian Vietoris	(Germany) Nico Hülkenberg	(Germany) Nico Hülkenberg	(France) ART Grand Prix	(France) Jules Bianchi
6	R2	(Germany) Nürburgring	27 July		(Germany) Nico Hülkenberg	(United Kingdom) Jon Lancaster	(France) ART Grand Prix	(United Kingdom) Jon Lancaster
7	R1	(United Kingdom) Brands Hatch	30 August	(France) Jules Bianchi	(France) Jules Bianchi	(Germany) Nico Hülkenberg	(France) ART Grand Prix	(United Kingdom) Jon Lancaster
7	R2	(United Kingdom) Brands Hatch	31 August		(Germany) Christian Vietoris	(France) Franck Mailleux	(France) Signature-Plus	(Netherlands) Henkie Waldschmidt
8	R1	(Spain) Circuit de Catalunya, Barcelona	20 September	(Germany) Nico Hülkenberg	(Netherlands) Henkie Waldschmidt	(Germany) Nico Hülkenberg	(France) ART Grand Prix	(Czech Republic) Erik Janiš
8	R2	(Spain) Circuit de Catalunya, Barcelona	21 September		(United Kingdom) Jon Lancaster	(Japan) Kazuya Oshima	(United Kingdom) Manor Motorsport	(France) Jules Bianchi
9	R1	(France) Bugatti Circuit, Le Mans	4 October	(France) Jules Bianchi	(Germany) Nico Hülkenberg	(France) Jules Bianchi	(France) ART Grand Prix	(France) Jules Bianchi
9	R2	(France) Bugatti Circuit, Le Mans	5 October		(France) Yann Clairay	(Canada) Robert Wickens	(France) Signature-Plus	(Canada) Robert Wickens
10	R1	(Germany) Hockenheimring	25 October	(Germany) Nico Hülkenberg	(Germany) Nico Hülkenberg	(Germany) Nico Hülkenberg	(France) ART Grand Prix	(Finland) Mika Mäki
10	R2	(Germany) Hockenheimring	26 October		(France) Jules Bianchi	(France) Jules Bianchi	(France) ART Grand Prix	(France) Jules Bianchi

== Season standings ==
=== Drivers Standings ===
- Points are awarded as follows:

	1	2	3	4	5	6	7	8	PP
Race 1	10	8	6	5	4	3	2	1	**1**
Race 2	6	5	4	3	2	1	0		0

Note: In the second races at the Norisring, the Bugatti Circuit and the October Hockenheim meeting, due to insufficient distance covered, half points were awarded.

Pos	Driver	HOC1 (Germany)		MUG (Italy)		PAU (France)		NOR (Germany)		ZAN (Netherlands)		NÜR (Germany)		BRH (United Kingdom)		CAT (Spain)		LMS (France)		HOC2 (Germany)		Pts
1	(Germany) Nico Hülkenberg	**Ret**	24†	**1**	5	Ret	16	**1**	Ret	**1**	13	1	4	1	5	**1**	Ret	24	8	**1**	3	85
2	(Italy) Edoardo Mortara	3	3	4	3	2	1	4	3	Ret	21	Ret	23	4	4	9	Ret	9	14	12	6	49.5
3	(France) Jules Bianchi	Ret	13	3	4	Ret	26†	Ret	9	3	9	2	3	**22**†	18	Ret	3	**1**	17	7	1	47
4	(Netherlands) Renger van der Zande	8	1	5	20	8	2	10	5	7	1	5	Ret	6	3	24	10	18	25	2	5	46
5	(Finland) Mika Mäki	1	23†	6	1	Ret	15	Ret	18	2	5	4	Ret	20	16	23†	13	3	20	3	9	46
6	(Germany) Christian Vietoris	7	2	28†	19	5	4	6	1	13	11	**Ret**	Ret	5	Ret	3	2	28†	10	EX	Ret	36
7	(Japan) Koudai Tsukakoshi	13	9	2	7	11†	18	2	Ret	Ret	Ret	Ret	11	2	8	Ret	24†	4	4	6	2	36
8	(France) Jean-Karl Vernay	5	22†	25	Ret	Ret	14	3	4	6	4	13	7	8	2	17	11	5	3	5	4	35
9	(France) Yann Clairay	11	5	7	2	Ret	13	Ret	19	5	2	14	6	3	6	4	5	22	16	13	10	33
10	(France) Franck Mailleux	4	4	11	10	4	5	18	15	11	3	18	9	7	1	12	Ret	23	21	17	13	27
11	(United Kingdom) Sam Bird	10	6	14	8	Ret	11	14	8	4	6	22	19	Ret	19	2	18	2	11	16	Ret	23
12	(United Kingdom) Jon Lancaster	Ret	DNS	23	25	3	7	5	Ret	Ret	24†	7	1	9	10	10	22	12	Ret	Ret	20	19
13	(United Kingdom) James Jakes	12	11	12	15	**1**	6	25	13	10	7	24†	22	21†	17	5	4	13	5	11	Ret	19
14	(Spain) Dani Clos	Ret	7	8	9	6	3	21	Ret	15	15	Ret	Ret	16	14	6	16	6	2	9	11	16.5
15	(Canada) Robert Wickens					9	8	7	2	8	Ret	12	16			Ret	14	7	1	23	8	10.5
16	(Republic of Ireland) Niall Breen	19	19	9	6	13†	Ret	24†	17	9	Ret	8	2	DSQ	20	16	15					8
17	(United States) Charlie Kimball	2	Ret	17	Ret	Ret	23															8
18	(France) Tom Dillmann	NC	15	16	27†	Ret	25†					3	5									8
19	(Japan) Kazuya Oshima	Ret	20	26†	18	10	10	13	7	14	8	11	20	Ret	21	8	1	21	12	Ret	19	7
20	(Monaco) Stefano Coletti	18	21	21	11			11	6	19	22†	9	Ret	19	25†	15	Ret	19	9	4	Ret	6.5
21	(Czech Republic) Erik Janiš	9	10	10	16	Ret	12	8	22	12	10	Ret	12	12	12	7	7	14	13	8	7	5
22	(Germany) Maximilian Götz	6	8	22	22	Ret	Ret	Ret	20													3
23	(Germany) Michael Klein	21	16	19	12	7	9	19	12													2
24	(Venezuela) Rodolfo González	15	12	18	13	Ret	21	12	Ret	24	20	21	25	17	15	20	19	17	6			0.5
25	(Spain) Daniel Campos-Hull	14	14	27†	21	Ret	19	17	11	23	14	20	8	13	13	Ret	17	10	7	14	Ret	0
26	(Netherlands) Henkie Waldschmidt	Ret	Ret	13	26†	Ret	17	9	Ret	17	23†	15	17	10	7	Ret	12	20	DNS	10	Ret	0
27	(Germany) Jens Klingmann	Ret	Ret	24	24	Ret	20	15	10	21	18	16	10	11	11	11	8	27	15	22	16	0
28	(France) Richard Philippe	16	17	15	17	12†	Ret	22	16	16	12	10	18	14	24	19	9	11	Ret	18	18	0
29	(China) Cong Fu Cheng					Ret	22	16	14	18	16	23	13	15	9	21	20	16	24	15	12	0
30	(Lebanon) Basil Shaaban	20	18	20	14	Ret	24	20	21†	22	19	19	24†	Ret	23	22	23	26	19	20	17	0
31	(United Kingdom) Martin Plowman	17	Ret	Ret	23	Ret	27†	23†	Ret	20	17	17	21	18	22							0
guest drivers ineligible for championship points
	(Australia) Daniel Ricciardo											6	15									0
	(New Zealand) Brendon Hartley											Ret	14			14	6	8	22	Ret	14	0
	(Germany) Peter Elkmann															13	21					0
	(France) Nelson Panciatici																	15	18			0
	(United Kingdom) Oliver Oakes																			Ret	15	0
	(Monaco) Stéphane Richelmi															18	Ret	25	23	21	21†	0
	(Belgium) Frédéric Vervisch																			19	Ret	0
Pos	Driver	HOC1 (Germany)		MUG (Italy)		PAU (France)		NOR (Germany)		ZAN (Netherlands)		NÜR (Germany)		BRH (United Kingdom)		CAT (Spain)		LMS (France)		HOC2 (Germany)		Pts

Colour	Result
Gold	Winner
Silver	Second place
Bronze	Third place
Green	Points classification
Blue	Non-points classification
Blue	Non-classified finish (NC)
Purple	Retired, not classified (Ret)
Red	Did not qualify (DNQ)
Red	Did not pre-qualify (DNPQ)
Black	Disqualified (DSQ)
White	Did not start (DNS)
White	Withdrew (WD)
White	Race cancelled (C)
Blank	Did not practice (DNP)
Blank	Did not arrive (DNA)
Blank	Excluded (EX)

† — Drivers did not finish the race, but were classified as they completed over 90% of the race distance.

- Pole-winners in **bold**; race 1 pole-winners earn one point (not awarded at Pau or Brands).
- Drivers achieving fastest lap in italics. No points awarded.

=== Rookie Cup ===
Rookie drivers are only eligible for the Rookie Cup title if they have not previously competed in a national or international Formula 3 championship.

Pos	Driver	HOC1 (Germany)		MUG (Italy)		PAU (France)		NOR (Germany)		ZAN (Netherlands)		NÜR (Germany)		BRH (United Kingdom)		CAT (Spain)		LMS (France)		HOC2 (Germany)		Pts
1	(Czech Republic) Erik Janiš	9	10	10	16	Ret	12	8	22	12	10	Ret	12	12	12	7	7	14	13	8	7	78
2	(Finland) Mika Mäki	1	Ret	6	1	Ret	15	Ret	18	2	5	4	Ret	20	16	23	13	3	20	3	9	76.5
3	(France) Jules Bianchi	Ret	13	3	4	Ret	26	Ret	9	3	9	2	3	**22**	18	Ret	3	**1**	17	7	1	75.5
4	(United Kingdom) Jon Lancaster	Ret	DNS	23	25	3	7	5	Ret	Ret	Ret	7	1	9	10	10	22	12	Ret	Ret	20	66
5	(France) Richard Philippe	16	17	15	17	Ret	Ret	22	16	16	12	10	18	14	24	19	9	11	Ret	18	18	49
6	(Canada) Robert Wickens					9	8	7	2	8	Ret	12	16			Ret	14	7	1	23	8	45
7	(Monaco) Stefano Coletti	18	21	21	11			11	6	19	Ret	9	Ret	19	25	15	Ret	19	9	4	Ret	42.5
8	(Spain) Daniel Campos-Hull	14	14	Ret	21	Ret	19	17	11	23	14	20	8	13	13	Ret	17	10	7	14	Ret	37.5
9	(Netherlands) Henkie Waldschmidt	Ret	Ret	13	26	Ret	17	9	Ret	17	Ret	15	17	10	7	Ret	12	20	DNS	10	Ret	37
10	(Germany) Jens Klingmann	Ret	Ret	24	24	Ret	20	15	10	21	18	16	10	11	11	11	8	27	15	22	16	32.5
11	(United Kingdom) Martin Plowman	17	Ret	Ret	23	Ret	Ret	Ret	Ret	20	17	17	21	18	22							8
Pos	Driver	HOC1 (Germany)		MUG (Italy)		PAU (France)		NOR (Germany)		ZAN (Netherlands)		NÜR (Germany)		BRH (United Kingdom)		CAT (Spain)		LMS (France)		HOC2 (Germany)		Pts

=== Team's standings ===
	Nation	Points
1	(France) ART Grand Prix	159
2	(France) Signature-Plus	110.5
3	(Germany) Mücke Motorsport	88
4	(Italy) Prema Powerteam	80
5	(United Kingdom) Manor Motorsport	78.5
6	(France) SG Formula	37
7	(Switzerland) Jo Zeller Racing	11
8	(Italy) R.C. Motorsport powered by Volkswagen	4
9	(United Kingdom) Carlin Motorsport	1.5
10	(Austria) HBR Motorsport	0

=== Nations Cup ===
	Nation	Points
1	France	140
2	Germany	119
3	Great Britain	64
4	Italy	49.5
5	Netherlands	48
6	Finland	47
7	Japan	43
8	Spain	17.5
9	Canada	11.5
10	Ireland	9
11	United States	8
12	Monaco	6.5
13	Czech Republic	5
14	Venezuela	0.5
