= 2007 Formula BMW World Final =

Formula BMW motorsport

Race details
Date	23–25 November 2007
Official name	3nd Formula BMW World Final
Location	Cheste, Valencia, Spain
Course	Permanent racing facility 3.099 km (1.926 mi)
Distance	Heat Races; 15 laps, 46.485 km (28.884 mi); Main Race; 22 laps, 68.178 km (42.364 mi)
- Main Race

Pole
Driver	(Austria) Philipp Eng	Mücke Motorsport

Podium
First	(Austria) Philipp Eng	Mücke Motorsport
Second	(Germany) Marco Wittmann	Josef Kaufmann Racing
Third	(Germany) Jens Klingmann	Eifelland Racing

The 2007 Formula BMW World Final was the third Formula BMW World Final race and was held for the second time at Circuit Ricardo Tormo in Cheste near Valencia on 23–25 November 2007. The shorter layout of the 3.099 km (1.926 mi) length was used. The race was won by Mücke Motorsport's driver Philipp Eng, who finished ahead Marco Wittmann and Jens Klingmann.

== Drivers and teams ==
2007 Entry List
Team	No	Driver	Main series
(Germany) AM-Holzer Rennsport GmbH	2	(Netherlands) Thomas Hylkema	Formula BMW ADAC
(Germany) AM-Holzer Rennsport GmbH	3	(Malaysia) Jazeman Jaafar	Formula BMW ADAC
(Germany) AM-Holzer Rennsport GmbH	4	(Thailand) Jack Lemvard	Formula BMW ADAC
(Germany) AM-Holzer Rennsport GmbH	5	(Republic of Ireland) Niall Quinn	Formula BMW ADAC
(Canada) Atlantic Racing Team	6	(United States) Eric Morrow	Formula BMW USA
(Canada) Team Autotecnica	7	(Mexico) Esteban Gutiérrez	Formula BMW USA
(United Kingdom) Double R Racing	8	(Australia) Sam Abay	Formula BMW UK
(United Kingdom) Double R Racing	9	(Colombia) Carlos Huertas	Formula BMW UK
(Germany) Eifelland Racing	10	(Spain) Daniel Campos-Hull	Formula BMW ADAC
(Germany) Eifelland Racing	11	(Brazil) Tiago Geronimi	Formula BMW ADAC
(Germany) Eifelland Racing	12	(Germany) Jens Klingmann	Formula BMW ADAC
(Germany) Eifelland Racing	14	(Colombia) Sebastián Saavedra	Formula BMW ADAC
(United States) EuroInternational	15	(Canada) Daniel Morad	Formula BMW USA
(United States) EuroInternational	16	(United States) Alexander Rossi	Formula BMW USA
(United States) EuroInternational	17	(France) Adrien Tambay	Formula BMW USA
(United Kingdom) Fortec Motorsport	18	(United Kingdom) Henry Arundel	Formula BMW UK
(United Kingdom) Fortec Motorsport	19	(Netherlands) Luuk Glansdorp	Formula BMW UK
(United Kingdom) Fortec Motorsport	20	(United Kingdom) Daniel McKenzie	Formula BMW UK
(United Kingdom) Fortec Motorsport	21	(Romania) Doru Sechelariu	Formula BMW UK
(United States) HBR Motorsport USA	22	(Brazil) Ricardo Favoretto	Formula BMW USA
(United States) HBR Motorsport USA	23	(Canada) Maxime Pelletier	Formula BMW USA
(Germany) Josef Kaufmann Racing	24	(Netherlands) Mathijs Harkema	Formula BMW ADAC
(Germany) Josef Kaufmann Racing	25	(Germany) Kevin Mirocha	Formula BMW ADAC
(Germany) Josef Kaufmann Racing	26	(Germany) Marco Wittmann	Formula BMW ADAC
(United Kingdom) Master Motorsport	27	(United Kingdom) Adam Butler	Formula BMW UK
(United Kingdom) Master Motorsport	28	(United Kingdom) Tom Gladdis	Formula BMW UK
(United Kingdom) Motaworld Racing	29	(United Kingdom) Matthew Bell	Formula BMW UK
(United Kingdom) Motaworld Racing	30	(Canada) Jordan Dick	Formula BMW UK
(United Kingdom) Motaworld Racing	31	(United Kingdom) Jonathan Legris	Formula BMW UK
(Germany) Mücke Motorsport	32	(Brazil) Pedro Bianchini	Formula BMW ADAC
(Germany) Mücke Motorsport	33	(Austria) Philipp Eng	Formula BMW ADAC
(Germany) Mücke Motorsport	34	(Czech Republic) Josef Král	Formula BMW ADAC
(United Kingdom) Team Loctite	35	(Japan) Kimiya Sato	Formula BMW UK
(United Kingdom) Team Loctite	36	(United Kingdom) Jordan Williams	Formula BMW UK
(Malaysia) Team TARADTM	37	(Indonesia) Zahir Ali	Formula BMW Asia

== Qualifying ==
=== Group 1 ===
Pos	No	Driver	Team	Time	Group
1	12	(Germany) Jens Klingmann	Eifelland Racing	1:17.265	SP
2	9	(Colombia) Carlos Huertas	Double R Racing	1:17.276	SP
3	34	(Czech Republic) Josef Král	Mücke Motorsport	1:17.298	SP
4	17	(France) Adrien Tambay	EuroInternational	1:17.527	SP
5	16	(United States) Alexander Rossi	EuroInternational	1:17.762	B
6	7	(Mexico) Esteban Gutiérrez	Team Autotecnica	1:17.827	D
7	31	(United Kingdom) Jonathan Legris	Motaworld Racing	1:17.846	B
8	5	(Republic of Ireland) Niall Quinn	AM-Holzer Rennsport GmbH	1:17.906	D
9	21	(Romania) Doru Sechelariu	Fortec Motorsport	1:17.908	B
10	23	(Canada) Maxime Pelletier	HBR Motorsport USA	1:18.004	D
11	20	(United Kingdom) Daniel McKenzie	Fortec Motorsport	1:18.010	B
12	35	(Japan) Kimiya Sato	Team Loctite	1:18.028	D
13	24	(Netherlands) Mathijs Harkema	Josef Kaufmann Racing	1:18.070	B
14	11	(Brazil) Tiago Geronimi	Eifelland Racing	1:18.073	D
15	30	(Canada) Jordan Dick	Motaworld Racing	1:18.182	B
16	3	(Malaysia) Jazeman Jaafar	AM-Holzer Rennsport GmbH	1:18.290	D
17	28	(United Kingdom) Tom Gladdis	Master Motorsport	1:18.738	B
18	27	(United Kingdom) Adam Butler	Master Motorsport	No time	D

=== Group 2 ===
Pos	No	Driver	Team	Time	Group
1	33	(Austria) Philipp Eng	Mücke Motorsport	1:16.832	SP
2	15	(Canada) Daniel Morad	EuroInternational	1:16.986	SP
3	26	(Germany) Marco Wittmann	Josef Kaufmann Racing	1:17.273	SP
4	8	(Australia) Sam Abay	Double R Racing	1:17.278	SP
5	18	(United Kingdom) Henry Arundel	Fortec Motorsport	1:17.322	A
6	25	(Germany) Kevin Mirocha	Josef Kaufmann Racing	1:17.579	C
7	14	(Colombia) Sebastián Saavedra	Eifelland Racing	1:17.683	A
8	19	(Netherlands) Luuk Glansdorp	Fortec Motorsport	1:17.737	C
9	22	(Brazil) Ricardo Favoretto	HBR Motorsport USA	1:17.751	A
10	32	(Brazil) Pedro Bianchini	Mücke Motorsport	1:17.842	C
11	10	(Spain) Daniel Campos-Hull	Eifelland Racing	1:17.910	A
12	37	(Indonesia) Zahir Ali	Team TARADTM	1:18.416	C
13	4	(Thailand) Jack Lemvard	AM-Holzer Rennsport GmbH	1:18.579	A
14	36	(United Kingdom) Jordan Williams	Team Loctite	1:18.598	C
15	2	(Netherlands) Thomas Hylkema	AM-Holzer Rennsport GmbH	1:18.636	A
16	6	(United States) Eric Morrow	Atlantic Racing Team	1:18.668	C
17	29	(United Kingdom) Matthew Bell	Motaworld Racing	1:18.741	A

=== Super Pole Competition ===
Pos	No	Driver	Team	Time	Group
1	33	(Austria) Philipp Eng	Mücke Motorsport	1:18.418	A
2	34	(Czech Republic) Josef Král	Mücke Motorsport	1:18.927	B
3	8	(Australia) Sam Abay	Double R Racing	1:19.159	C
4	17	(France) Adrien Tambay	EuroInternational	1:19.200	D
5	9	(Colombia) Carlos Huertas	Double R Racing	1:19.209	D
6	12	(Germany) Jens Klingmann	Eifelland Racing	1:19.271	B
7	15	(Canada) Daniel Morad	EuroInternational	1:19.329	C
8	26	(Germany) Marco Wittmann	Josef Kaufmann Racing	1:19.487	A

== Heats ==
=== Heat 1 (A vs B) ===
Pos	No	Name	Team	Laps	Time/Retired	Points
1	33	(Austria) Philipp Eng	Mücke Motorsport	15	23:43.030	0
2	34	(Czech Republic) Josef Král	Mücke Motorsport	15	+1.7	2
3	14	(Colombia) Sebastián Saavedra	Eifelland Racing	15	+4.7	3
4	31	(United Kingdom) Jonathan Legris	Motaworld Racing	15	+6.0	4
5	26	(Germany) Marco Wittmann	Josef Kaufmann Racing	15	+6.7	5
6	18	(United Kingdom) Henry Arundel	Fortec Motorsport	15	+9.1	6
7	20	(United Kingdom) Daniel McKenzie	Fortec Motorsport	15	+9.7	7
8	22	(Brazil) Ricardo Favoretto	HBR Motorsport USA	15	+12.3	8
9	10	(Spain) Daniel Campos-Hull	Eifelland Racing	15	+12.8	9
10	2	(Netherlands) Thomas Hylkema	AM-Holzer Rennsport GmbH	15	+15.9	10
11	24	(Netherlands) Mathijs Harkema	Josef Kaufmann Racing	15	+16.8	11
12	21	(Romania) Doru Sechelariu	Fortec Motorsport	15	+17.0	12
13	29	(United Kingdom) Matthew Bell	Motaworld Racing	15	+17.5	13
14	4	(Thailand) Jack Lemvard	AM-Holzer Rennsport GmbH	15	+20.8	14
15	28	(United Kingdom) Tom Gladdis	Master Motorsport	15	+21.3	15
Ret	16	(United States) Alexander Rossi	EuroInternational	3	+12 laps	16
Ret	12	(Germany) Jens Klingmann	Eifelland Racing	0	+15 laps	17
EX	30	(Canada) Jordan Dick	Motaworld Racing	Excluded from the meeting		

=== Heat 2 (C vs D) ===
Pos	No	Name	Team	Laps	Time/Retired	Points
1	15	(Canada) Daniel Morad	EuroInternational	15	19:37.460	0
2	8	(Australia) Sam Abay	Double R Racing	15	+1.4	2
3	5	(Republic of Ireland) Niall Quinn	AM-Holzer Rennsport GmbH	15	+10.0	3
4	25	(Germany) Kevin Mirocha	Josef Kaufmann Racing	15	+11.3	4
5	9	(Colombia) Carlos Huertas	Double R Racing	15	+11.6	5
6	7	(Mexico) Esteban Gutiérrez	Team Autotecnica	15	+13.4	6
7	19	(Netherlands) Luuk Glansdorp	Fortec Motorsport	15	+15.5	7
8	23	(Canada) Maxime Pelletier	HBR Motorsport USA	15	+16.4	8
9	32	(Brazil) Pedro Bianchini	Mücke Motorsport	15	+20.5	9
10	3	(Malaysia) Jazeman Jaafar	AM-Holzer Rennsport GmbH	15	+21.5	10
11	37	(Indonesia) Zahir Ali	Team TARADTM	15	+22.1	11
12	35	(Japan) Kimiya Sato	Team Loctite	15	+22.7	12
13	11	(Brazil) Tiago Geronimi	Eifelland Racing	15	+25.9	13
14	27	(United Kingdom) Adam Butler	Master Motorsport	15	+39.2	14
15	6	(United States) Eric Morrow	Atlantic Racing Team	15	+39.5	15
16	36	(United Kingdom) Jordan Williams	Team Loctite	14	+1 lap	16
Ret	17	(France) Adrien Tambay	EuroInternational	0	N/A	17

=== Heat 3 (A vs C) ===
Pos	No	Name	Team	Laps	Time/Retired	Points
1	15	(Canada) Daniel Morad	EuroInternational	15	19:33.698	0
2	33	(Austria) Philipp Eng	Mücke Motorsport	15	+0.6	2
3	26	(Germany) Marco Wittmann	Josef Kaufmann Racing	15	+9.1	3
4	25	(Germany) Kevin Mirocha	Josef Kaufmann Racing	15	+12.8	4
5	10	(Spain) Daniel Campos-Hull	Eifelland Racing	15	+14.4	5
6	14	(Colombia) Sebastián Saavedra	Eifelland Racing	15	+15.4	6
7	18	(United Kingdom) Henry Arundel	Fortec Motorsport	15	+16.0	7
8	32	(Brazil) Pedro Bianchini	Mücke Motorsport	15	+19.1	8
9	19	(Netherlands) Luuk Glansdorp	Fortec Motorsport	15	+25.4	9
10	36	(United Kingdom) Jordan Williams	Team Loctite	15	+27.2	10
11	2	(Netherlands) Thomas Hylkema	AM-Holzer Rennsport GmbH	15	+28.7	11
12	8	(Australia) Sam Abay	Double R Racing	15	+29.4	12
13	6	(United States) Eric Morrow	Atlantic Racing Team	15	+30.2	13
14	4	(Thailand) Jack Lemvard	AM-Holzer Rennsport GmbH	15	+38.7	14
15	29	(United Kingdom) Matthew Bell	Motaworld Racing	15	+47.5	15
16	22	(Brazil) Ricardo Favoretto	HBR Motorsport USA	15	+1:00.1	16
Ret	37	(Indonesia) Zahir Ali	Team TARADTM	6	+9 laps	17

=== Heat 4 (B vs D) ===
Pos	No	Name	Team	Laps	Time/Retired	Points
1	12	(Germany) Jens Klingmann	Eifelland Racing	15	19:36.993	0
2	34	(Czech Republic) Josef Král	Mücke Motorsport	15	+1.1	2
3	9	(Colombia) Carlos Huertas	Double R Racing	15	+4.6	3
4	31	(United Kingdom) Jonathan Legris	Motaworld Racing	15	+11.7	4
5	7	(Mexico) Esteban Gutiérrez	Team Autotecnica	15	+12.1	5
6	5	(Republic of Ireland) Niall Quinn	AM-Holzer Rennsport GmbH	15	+16.8	6
7	16	(United States) Alexander Rossi	EuroInternational	15	+18.0	7
8	20	(United Kingdom) Daniel McKenzie	Fortec Motorsport	15	+18.8	8
9	11	(Brazil) Tiago Geronimi	Eifelland Racing	15	+23.6	9
10	23	(Canada) Maxime Pelletier	HBR Motorsport USA	15	+23.7	10
11	24	(Netherlands) Mathijs Harkema	Josef Kaufmann Racing	15	+26.3	11
12	3	(Malaysia) Jazeman Jaafar	AM-Holzer Rennsport GmbH	15	+26.7	12
13	35	(Japan) Kimiya Sato	Team Loctite	15	+27.3	13
14	28	(United Kingdom) Tom Gladdis	Master Motorsport	15	+30.0	14
15	27	(United Kingdom) Adam Butler	Master Motorsport	15	+38.6	15
Ret	17	(France) Adrien Tambay	EuroInternational	10	+5 laps	16
Ret	21	(Romania) Doru Sechelariu	Fortec Motorsport	0	+15 laps	17

=== Heat 5 (A vs D) ===
Pos	No	Name	Team	Laps	Time/Retired	Points
1	33	(Austria) Philipp Eng	Mücke Motorsport	15	19:36.075	0
2	17	(France) Adrien Tambay	EuroInternational	15	+8.9	2
3	18	(United Kingdom) Henry Arundel	Fortec Motorsport	15	+13.0	3
4	7	(Mexico) Esteban Gutiérrez	Team Autotecnica	15	+13.6	4
5	26	(Germany) Marco Wittmann	Josef Kaufmann Racing	15	+14.7	5
6	14	(Colombia) Sebastián Saavedra	Eifelland Racing	15	+16.0	6
7	9	(Colombia) Carlos Huertas	Double R Racing	15	+17.6	7
8	10	(Spain) Daniel Campos-Hull	Eifelland Racing	15	+18.1	8
9	23	(Canada) Maxime Pelletier	HBR Motorsport USA	15	+21.5	9
10	4	(Thailand) Jack Lemvard	AM-Holzer Rennsport GmbH	15	+28.5	10
11	29	(United Kingdom) Matthew Bell	Motaworld Racing	15	+28.6	11
12	3	(Malaysia) Jazeman Jaafar	AM-Holzer Rennsport GmbH	15	+33.4	12
13	35	(Japan) Kimiya Sato	Team Loctite	15	+34.2	13
14	22	(Brazil) Ricardo Favoretto	HBR Motorsport USA	15	+58.1	14
15	27	(United Kingdom) Adam Butler	Master Motorsport	15	+1:00.9	15
16	2	(Netherlands) Thomas Hylkema	AM-Holzer Rennsport GmbH	15	+1:12.7	16
17	11	(Brazil) Tiago Geronimi	Eifelland Racing	15	+1:16.1	17
Ret	5	(Republic of Ireland) Niall Quinn	AM-Holzer Rennsport GmbH	0	+15 laps	18

=== Heat 6 (B vs C) ===
Pos	No	Name	Team	Laps	Time/Retired	Points
1	12	(Germany) Jens Klingmann	Eifelland Racing	15	19:33.555	0
2	34	(Czech Republic) Josef Král	Mücke Motorsport	15	+3.5	2
3	15	(Canada) Daniel Morad	EuroInternational	15	+4.0	3
4	31	(United Kingdom) Jonathan Legris	Motaworld Racing	15	+9.5	4
5	25	(Germany) Kevin Mirocha	Josef Kaufmann Racing	15	+10.2	5
6	32	(Brazil) Pedro Bianchini	Mücke Motorsport	15	+14.7	6
7	24	(Netherlands) Mathijs Harkema	Josef Kaufmann Racing	15	+18.8	7
8	20	(United Kingdom) Daniel McKenzie	Fortec Motorsport	15	+19.1	8
9	21	(Romania) Doru Sechelariu	Fortec Motorsport	15	+19.7	9
10	19	(Netherlands) Luuk Glansdorp	Fortec Motorsport	15	+23.3	10
11	36	(United Kingdom) Jordan Williams	Team Loctite	15	+23.7	11
12	6	(United States) Eric Morrow	Atlantic Racing Team	15	+27.3	12
13	28	(United Kingdom) Tom Gladdis	Master Motorsport	15	+29.5	13
14	37	(Indonesia) Zahir Ali	Team TARADTM	15	+34.4	14
Ret	16	(United States) Alexander Rossi	EuroInternational	10	+5 laps	15
Ret	8	(Australia) Sam Abay	Double R Racing	3	+12 laps	16

=== Summary ===
Pos	No	Name	Team	Points
1	33	(Austria) Philipp Eng	Mücke Motorsport	2
2	15	(Canada) Daniel Morad	EuroInternational	3
3	34	(Czech Republic) Josef Král	Mücke Motorsport	6
4	31	(United Kingdom) Jonathan Legris	Motaworld Racing	12
5	26	(Germany) Marco Wittmann	Josef Kaufmann Racing	13
6	25	(Germany) Kevin Mirocha	Josef Kaufmann Racing	13
7	9	(Colombia) Carlos Huertas	Double R Racing	15
8	14	(Colombia) Sebastián Saavedra	Eifelland Racing	15
9	7	(Mexico) Esteban Gutiérrez	Team Autotecnica	15
10	18	(United Kingdom) Henry Arundel	Fortec Motorsport	16
11	12	(Germany) Jens Klingmann	Eifelland Racing	17
12	10	(Spain) Daniel Campos-Hull	Eifelland Racing	22
13	32	(Brazil) Pedro Bianchini	Mücke Motorsport	23
14	20	(United Kingdom) Daniel McKenzie	Fortec Motorsport	23
15	19	(Netherlands) Luuk Glansdorp	Fortec Motorsport	26
16	5	(Republic of Ireland) Niall Quinn	AM-Holzer Rennsport GmbH	27
17	23	(Canada) Maxime Pelletier	HBR Motorsport USA	27
18	24	(Netherlands) Mathijs Harkema	Josef Kaufmann Racing	29
19	8	(Australia) Sam Abay	Double R Racing	30
20	3	(Malaysia) Jazeman Jaafar	AM-Holzer Rennsport GmbH	34
21	17	(France) Adrien Tambay	EuroInternational	35
22	36	(United Kingdom) Jordan Williams	Team Loctite	37
23	2	(Netherlands) Thomas Hylkema	AM-Holzer Rennsport GmbH	37
24	16	(United States) Alexander Rossi	EuroInternational	38
25	22	(Brazil) Ricardo Favoretto	HBR Motorsport USA	38
26	21	(Romania) Doru Sechelariu	Fortec Motorsport	38
27	4	(Thailand) Jack Lemvard	AM-Holzer Rennsport GmbH	38
28	35	(Japan) Kimiya Sato	Team Loctite	38
29	11	(Brazil) Tiago Geronimi	Eifelland Racing	39
30	29	(United Kingdom) Matthew Bell	Motaworld Racing	39
31	6	(United States) Eric Morrow	Atlantic Racing Team	40
32	37	(Indonesia) Zahir Ali	Team TARADTM	42
33	28	(United Kingdom) Tom Gladdis	Master Motorsport	42
34	27	(United Kingdom) Adam Butler	Master Motorsport	44

== Final Race ==
Pos	No	Driver	Team	Laps	Time/Retired	Grid
1	33	(Austria) Philipp Eng	Mücke Motorsport	22	28:38.290	1
2	26	(Germany) Marco Wittmann	Josef Kaufmann Racing	22	+9.2	5
3	12	(Germany) Jens Klingmann	Eifelland Racing	22	+14.0	11
4	14	(Colombia) Sebastián Saavedra	Eifelland Racing	22	+19.9	8
5	9	(Colombia) Carlos Huertas	Double R Racing	22	+20.8	7
6	18	(United Kingdom) Henry Arundel	Fortec Motorsport	22	+21.3	10
7	10	(Spain) Daniel Campos-Hull	Eifelland Racing	22	+24.0	12
8	19	(Netherlands) Luuk Glansdorp	Fortec Motorsport	22	+25.3	15
9	36	(United Kingdom) Jordan Williams	Team Loctite	22	+25.8	22
10	5	(Republic of Ireland) Niall Quinn	AM-Holzer Rennsport GmbH	22	+27.2	16
11	22	(Brazil) Ricardo Favoretto	HBR Motorsport USA	22	+28.4	25
12	8	(Australia) Sam Abay	Double R Racing	22	+29.1	19
13	35	(Japan) Kimiya Sato	Team Loctite	22	+36.8	28
14	17	(France) Adrien Tambay	Eurointernational	22	+37.5	21
15	29	(United Kingdom) Matthew Bell	Motaworld Racing	22	+41.7	30
16	2	(Netherlands) Thomas Hylkema	AM-Holzer Rennsport GmbH	22	+43.0	23
17	4	(Thailand) Jack Lemvard	AM-Holzer Rennsport GmbH	22	+46.6	27
18	3	(Malaysia) Jazeman Jaafar	AM-Holzer Rennsport GmbH	22	+47.3	20
19	6	(United States) Eric Morrow	Atlantic Racing Team	22	+47.7	31
20	37	(Indonesia) Zahir Ali	Team TARADTM	22	+52.7	32
21	21	(Romania) Doru Sechelariu	Fortec Motorsport	22	+52.8	26
22	25	(Germany) Kevin Mirocha	Josef Kaufmann Racing	22	+58.7	6
23	28	(United Kingdom) Tom Gladdis	Master Motorsport	22	+58.9	33
24	32	(Brazil) Pedro Bianchini	Mücke Motorsport	22	+1:12.3	13
25	7	(Mexico) Esteban Gutierrez	Team Autotecnica	22	+1:14.6	9
Ret	27	(United Kingdom) Adam Butler	Master Motorsport	6	+16 laps	34
Ret	20	(United Kingdom) Daniel McKenzie	Fortec Motorsport	5	+17 laps	14
Ret	24	(Netherlands) Mathijs Harkema	Josef Kaufmann Racing	4	+18 laps	18
Ret	15	(Canada) Daniel Morad	Eurointernational	2	+20 laps	2
Ret	11	(Brazil) Tiago Geronimi	Eifelland Racing	1	+21 laps	29
Ret	23	(Canada) Maxime Pelletier	HBR Motorsport USA	0	+15 laps	17
Ret	16	(United States) Alexander Rossi	Eurointernational	0	+15 laps	24
EX	34	(Czech Republic) Josef Král	Mücke Motorsport	N/A	N/A	3
EX	31	(United Kingdom) Jonathan Legris	Motaworld Racing	N/A	N/A	4
