= 2009 Formula 3 Euro Series =

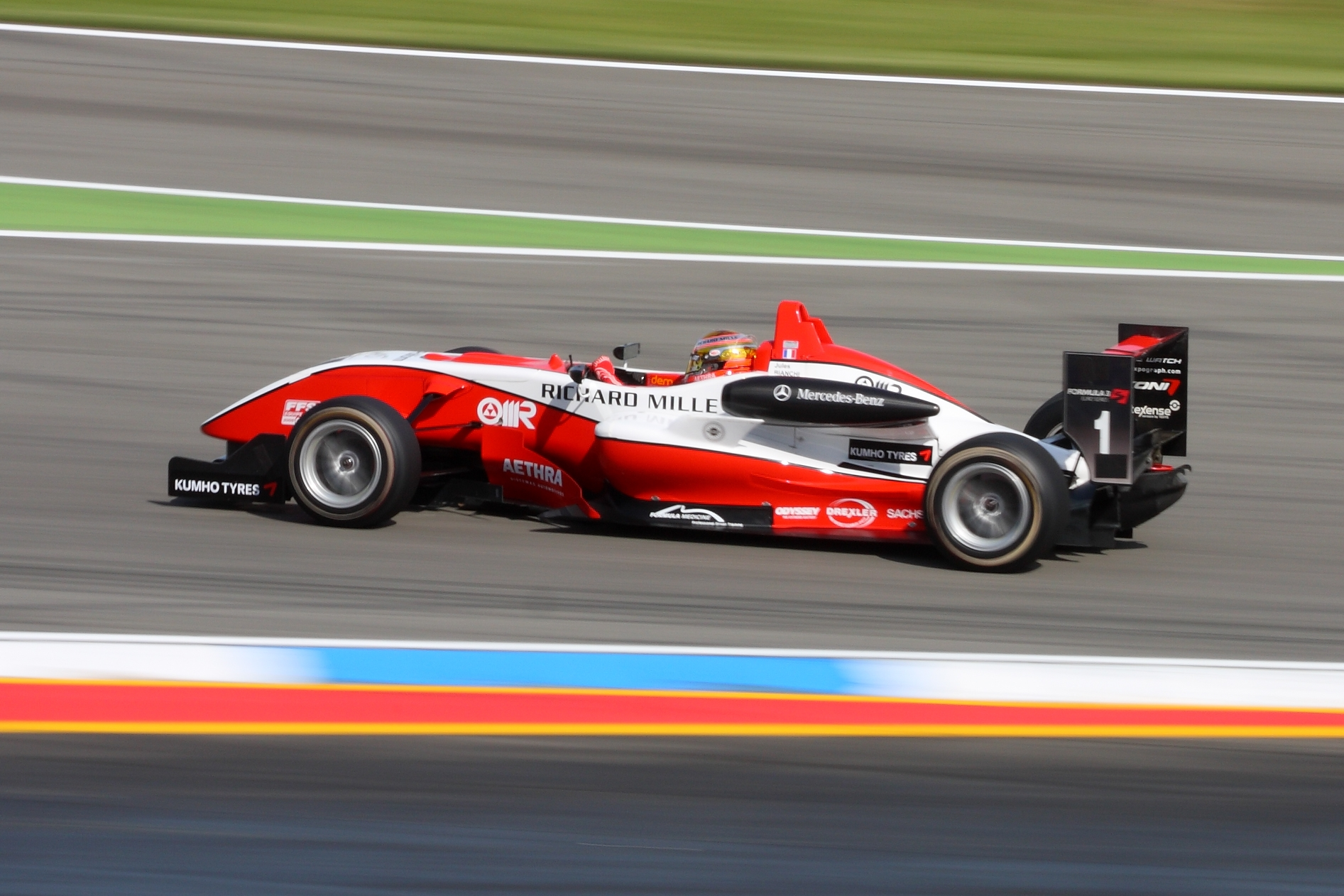
Jules Bianchi was series champion, scoring a total of nine victories during the season.

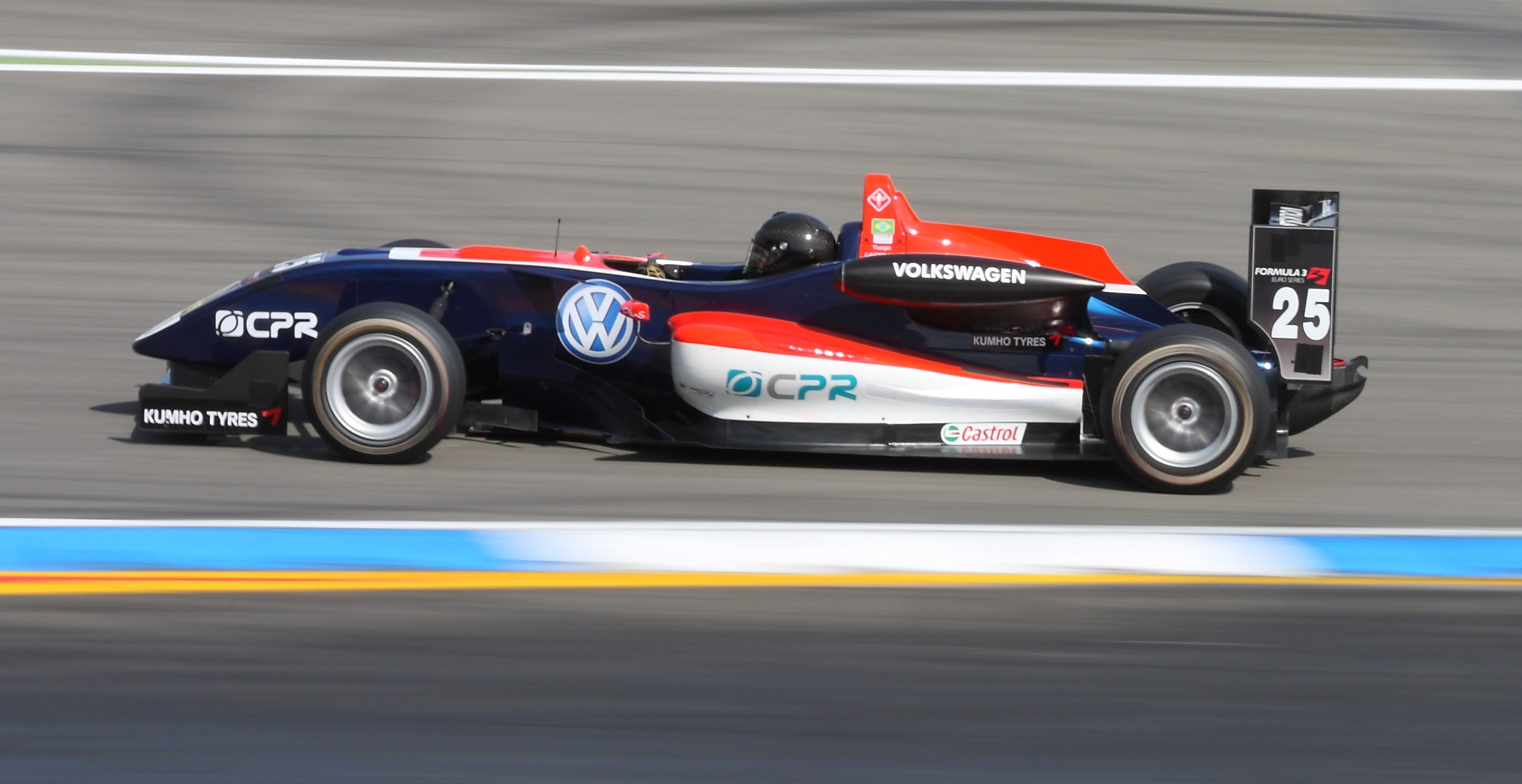
Tiago Geronimi at the Hockenheimring.

The 2009 Formula 3 Euro Series season was the seventh championship year of the Formula 3 Euro Series. The series consisted of ten double-header meetings beginning at Hockenheim on 16 May and ending at the same venue on 25 October. Jules Bianchi claimed the title for ART Grand Prix, winning his eighth race of the season at Dijon-Prenois.

== Drivers and teams ==
2009 Entry List
Team	No	Driver	Rookie	Chassis (Note: All drivers competed in Dallara chassis; model listed.)	Engine	Rounds
(France) ART Grand Prix	1	(France) Jules Bianchi		F308/026	Mercedes	1-6
(France) ART Grand Prix	1	(France) Jules Bianchi		F308/048	Mercedes	7-10
(France) ART Grand Prix	2	(Finland) Valtteri Bottas	R	F308/009	Mercedes	All
(France) ART Grand Prix	23	(Mexico) Esteban Gutiérrez	R	F308/070	Mercedes	All
(France) ART Grand Prix	24	(France) Adrien Tambay	R	F308/040	Mercedes	1–4, 7–10
(France) Signature	3	(Finland) Mika Mäki		F308/073	Volkswagen	1–9
(France) Signature	3	(Finland) Mika Mäki		F308/033	Volkswagen	10
(France) Signature	4	(France) Jean-Karl Vernay		F308/033	Volkswagen	1
(France) Signature	4	(France) Jean-Karl Vernay		F308/011	Volkswagen	2–10
(France) Signature	25	(Brazil) Tiago Geronimi	R	F308/057	Volkswagen	All
(Italy) Prema Powerteam	5	(Lebanon) Basil Shaaban		F308/031	Mercedes	All
(Italy) Prema Powerteam	6	(Monaco) Stefano Coletti		F309/014	Mercedes	1–6, 8
(Italy) Prema Powerteam	6	(Monaco) Stefano Coletti		F308/047	Mercedes	9–10
(Italy) Prema Powerteam	27	(Italy) Matteo Chinosi		F308/047	Mercedes	1–4
(Italy) Prema Powerteam	34	(France) Tom Dillmann		F308/015	Mercedes	9
(Italy) Prema Powerteam	35	(Germany) Tim Sandtler		F308/047	Mercedes	7–8
(Italy) Prema Powerteam	42	(Spain) Víctor García		F308/015	Mercedes	10
(Germany) Mücke Motorsport	7	(Germany) Christian Vietoris		F308/050	Mercedes	1–9
(Germany) Mücke Motorsport	8	(United Kingdom) Sam Bird		F308/042	Mercedes	1–9
(Germany) Mücke Motorsport	14	(Germany) Marco Wittmann	R	F308/044	Mercedes	1–9
(Germany) Mücke Motorsport	14	(Germany) Marco Wittmann	R	F308/050	Mercedes	10
(Germany) Mücke Motorsport	26	(United Kingdom) Alexander Sims	R	F308/005	Mercedes	All
(Germany) Mücke Motorsport	37	(Germany) Nico Monien		F308/042	Mercedes	10
(United Kingdom) Manor Motorsport	9	(Brazil) César Ramos	R	F308/046	Mercedes	1–8
(United Kingdom) Manor Motorsport	10	(Brazil) Pedro Enrique		F308/001	Mercedes	All
(United Kingdom) Manor Motorsport	28	(Spain) Roberto Merhi		F308/036	Mercedes	All
(France) SG Formula	11	(Netherlands) Henkie Waldschmidt		F308/029	Mercedes	All
(France) SG Formula	12	(France) Alexandre Marsoin		F308/072	Mercedes	1–2
(France) SG Formula	22	(Netherlands) Carlo van Dam		F308/072	Mercedes	8
(France) SG Formula	30	(Italy) Andrea Caldarelli	R	F308/014	Mercedes	All
(United Kingdom) Carlin Motorsport	15	(New Zealand) Brendon Hartley		F308/074	Volkswagen	1–7, 9
(United Kingdom) Carlin Motorsport	16	(United States) Jake Rosenzweig	R	F308/055	Volkswagen	All
(United Kingdom) Carlin Motorsport	43	(Italy) Mirko Bortolotti		F308/074	Volkswagen	10
(Austria) HBR Motorsport	17	(Germany) Kevin Mirocha		F308/021	Mercedes	1–4
(Austria) HBR Motorsport	18	(Venezuela) Johnny Cecotto Jr.		F308/052	Mercedes	1–6
(Austria) HBR Motorsport	34	(France) Tom Dillmann		F308/021	Mercedes	5–6, 10
(Germany) Motopark Academy	19	(Finland) Atte Mustonen		F308/098	Mercedes	1–4, 6–7
(Germany) Motopark Academy	20	(Switzerland) Christopher Zanella	R	F308/099	Mercedes	All
(Germany) Motopark Academy	33	(Netherlands) Renger van der Zande		F308/098	Mercedes	5, 8–10
(Germany) Kolles & Heinz Union	21	(Canada) Robert Wickens		F309/001	Volkswagen	1
(Germany) Kolles & Heinz Union	21	(Canada) Robert Wickens		F309/003	Volkswagen	9
(Germany) Kolles & Heinz Union	22	(Netherlands) Carlo van Dam		F309/003	Volkswagen	1–2
(Germany) Kolles & Heinz Union	31	(Denmark) Johan Jokinen	R	F309/001	Volkswagen	2–10
(Germany) Kolles & Heinz Union	32	(United Kingdom) Nick Tandy		F309/003	Volkswagen	3–8
(Germany) Kolles & Heinz Union	36	(Italy) Edoardo Mortara		F309/003	Volkswagen	10

Icon	Legend
R	Rookie Cup

=== Driver changes ===
Changed Teams

- Sam Bird: Manor Motorsport → Mücke Motorsport
- Tom Dillmann: SG Formula → HBR Motorsport
- Mika Mäki: Mücke Motorsport → Signature-Plus
- Edoardo Mortara: Signature-Plus → Kolles & Heinz Union
- Basil Shaaban: HBR Motorsport → Prema Powerteam
- Robert Wickens: Signature-Plus → Kolles & Heinz Union
- Renger van der Zande: Prema Powerteam → (Motopark Academy)

Entering/Re-Entering Formula 3 Euro Series

- Mirko Bortolotti: Italian Formula Three Championship (Lucidi Motors) → Carlin Motorsport
- Valtteri Bottas: Formula Renault 2.0 Northern European Cup & Eurocup Formula Renault 2.0 (Motopark Academy) → ART Grand Prix
- Andrea Caldarelli: Formula Renault 2.0 West European Cup & Eurocup Formula Renault 2.0 (SG Formula) → SG Formula
- Johnny Cecotto Jr.: German Formula Three Championship (HS Technik Motorsport) → HBR Motorsport
- Matteo Chinosi: German Formula Three Championship (Ombra Racing) → Prema Powerteam
- Carlo van Dam: All-Japan Formula Three Championship (Petronas Team Tom's) → Manor Motorsport
- Pedro Enrique: Formula Three Sudamericana (Cesário Fórmula) → Manor Motorsport
- Víctor García Spanish Formula Three Championship (Escuderia TEC-Auto & RP Motorsport) → Prema Powerteam
- Tiago Geronimi: Formula BMW Europe (Eifelland Racing) → Signature-Plus
- Esteban Gutiérrez: Formula BMW Europe (Josef Kaufmann Racing) → ART Grand Prix
- Johan Jokinen: Formula Renault 2.0 Northern European Cup (Motopark Academy) → Kolles & Heinz Union
- Alexandre Marsoin: Formula Renault 3.5 Series (Epsilon Euskadi) → SG Formula
- Roberto Merhi: Formula Renault 2.0 West European Cup & Eurocup Formula Renault 2.0 (Epsilon Euskadi) → Manor Motorsport
- Kevin Mirocha: German Formula Three Championship (Josef Kaufmann Racing) → HBR Motorsport
- Nico Monien: ADAC Formel Masters (URD Rennsport) → Mücke Motorsport
- Atte Mustonen: British Formula 3 Championship (Räikkönen Robertson Racing) → Motopark Academy
- César Ramos: Italian Formula Renault Championship & Eurocup Formula Renault 2.0 (BVM Minardi Team) → Manor Motorsport
- Jake Rosenzweig: Formula Renault 2.0 West European Cup & Eurocup Formula Renault 2.0 (Epsilon Euskadi) → Carlin Motorsport
- Tim Sandtler: International Formula Master (Team ISR) → Prema Powerteam
- Alexander Sims: British Formula Renault Championship (Manor Competition) → Mücke Motorsport
- Adrien Tambay: Formula BMW Europe (Eifelland Racing) → ART Grand Prix
- Nick Tandy: British Formula 3 Championship (JTR with Marshall Westland) → Kolles & Heinz Union
- Marco Wittmann: Formula BMW Europe (Josef Kaufmann Racing) → Mücke Motorsport
- Christopher Zanella: Swiss Formula Renault Championship (Jenzer Motorsport) → Motopark Academy

Leaving Formula 3 Euro Series

- Niall Breen: Manor Motorsport → Sabbatical
- Daniel Campos-Hull: HBR Motorsport → Italian Formula Three Championship (Prema Powerteam)
- Yann Clairay: SG Formula → Le Mans Series (Luc Alphand Aventures)
- Cong Fu Cheng: RC Motorsport → A1 Grand Prix (A1 Team China)
- Dani Clos: Prema Powerteam → GP2 Series (Fat Burner Racing Engineering)
- Peter Elkmann: RC Motorsport → German Formula Three Championship (Performance Racing)
- Rodolfo González: Carlin Motorsport → Euroseries 3000 (Fisichella Motor Sport)
- Maximilian Götz: RC Motorsport → Lamborghini Blancpain Super Trofeo – Pro (Lamborghini München Team Holzer)
- Nico Hülkenberg: ART Grand Prix → GP2 Series (ART Grand Prix)
- James Jakes: ART Grand Prix → GP2 Asia Series (Super Nova Racing)
- Erik Janiš: Mücke Motorsport → International Formula Master (ISR Racing)
- Charlie Kimball: Prema Powerteam → Firestone Indy Lights (Team PBIR)
- Michael Klein: Jo Zeller Racing → Retirement
- Jens Klingmann: RC Motorsport → FIA GT3 European Championship (Alpina)
- Jon Lancaster: ART Grand Prix → Formula Renault 3.5 Series (Comtec Racing)
- Franck Mailleux: Signature-Plus → Le Mans Series (Signature-Plus)
- Oliver Oakes: Carlin Motorsport → British Formula 3 Championship (Carlin Motorsport)
- Kazuya Oshima: Manor Motorsport → Formula Nippon (Petronas Team TOM'S) & Super GT (Lexus Team Kraft)
- Nelson Panciatici: RC Motorsport → GP2 Series (Durango)
- Richard Philippe: Carlin Motorsport → Firestone Indy Lights (Genoa Racing)
- Martin Plowman: RC Motorsport → Firestone Indy Lights (Panther Racing)
- Daniel Ricciardo: SG Formula → British Formula 3 Championship (Carlin Motorsport)
- Koudai Tsukakoshi: Manor Motorsport → Formula Nippon (HFDP Racing) & Super GT (Keihin Real Racing)
- Frédéric Vervisch: RC Motorsport → Atlantic Championship (Genoa Racing)

== Calendar ==
Round		Circuit	Date	Pole position	Fastest lap	Winning driver	Winning team
1	R1	(Germany) Hockenheimring	16 May	(United Kingdom) Sam Bird	(United Kingdom) Alexander Sims	(Monaco) Stefano Coletti	(Italy) Prema Powerteam
1	R2	(Germany) Hockenheimring	17 May		(Finland) Mika Mäki	(France) Jean-Karl Vernay	(France) Signature
2	R1	(Germany) EuroSpeedway Lausitz	30 May	(Finland) Valtteri Bottas	(Monaco) Stefano Coletti	(France) Jules Bianchi	(France) ART Grand Prix
2	R2	(Germany) EuroSpeedway Lausitz	31 May		(Netherlands) Henkie Waldschmidt	(Germany) Christian Vietoris	(Germany) Mücke Motorsport
3	R1	(Germany) Norisring, Nuremberg	27 June	(United Kingdom) Alexander Sims	(Finland) Valtteri Bottas	(France) Jules Bianchi	(France) ART Grand Prix
3	R2	(Germany) Norisring, Nuremberg	28 June		(France) Jean-Karl Vernay	(Germany) Christian Vietoris	(Germany) Mücke Motorsport
4	R1	(Netherlands) Circuit Park Zandvoort	18 July	(France) Jules Bianchi	(France) Jules Bianchi	(France) Jules Bianchi	(France) ART Grand Prix
4	R2	(Netherlands) Circuit Park Zandvoort	19 July		(France) Jules Bianchi	(France) Jules Bianchi	(France) ART Grand Prix
5	R1	(Germany) Motorsport Arena Oschersleben	1 August	(France) Jules Bianchi	(France) Jules Bianchi	(France) Jules Bianchi	(France) ART Grand Prix
5	R2	(Germany) Motorsport Arena Oschersleben	2 August		(Monaco) Stefano Coletti	(Germany) Christian Vietoris	(Germany) Mücke Motorsport
6	R1	(Germany) Nürburgring	15 August	(France) Jules Bianchi	(France) Jules Bianchi	(France) Jules Bianchi	(France) ART Grand Prix
6	R2	(Germany) Nürburgring	16 August		(United Kingdom) Alexander Sims	(United Kingdom) Alexander Sims	(Germany) Mücke Motorsport
7	R1	(United Kingdom) Brands Hatch, Kent	5 September	(Finland) Valtteri Bottas	(Germany) Christian Vietoris	(Finland) Mika Mäki	(France) Signature
7	R2	(United Kingdom) Brands Hatch, Kent	6 September		(United Kingdom) Sam Bird	(New Zealand) Brendon Hartley	(United Kingdom) Carlin Motorsport
8	R1	(Spain) Circuit de Catalunya, Barcelona	19 September	(France) Jules Bianchi	(Italy) Andrea Caldarelli	(France) Jules Bianchi	(France) ART Grand Prix
8	R2	(Spain) Circuit de Catalunya, Barcelona	20 September		(France) Jules Bianchi	(Netherlands) Renger van der Zande	(Germany) Motopark Academy
9	R1	(France) Dijon-Prenois	10 October	(France) Jules Bianchi	(France) Jules Bianchi	(Germany) Christian Vietoris	(Germany) Mücke Motorsport
9	R2	(France) Dijon-Prenois	11 October		(United Kingdom) Sam Bird	(France) Jules Bianchi	(France) ART Grand Prix
10	R1	(Germany) Hockenheimring	24 October	(France) Jules Bianchi	(France) Jules Bianchi	(France) Jules Bianchi	(France) ART Grand Prix
10	R2	(Germany) Hockenheimring	25 October		(France) Jean-Karl Vernay	(France) Jean-Karl Vernay	(France) Signature

== Season standings ==
=== Drivers Standings ===
- Points are awarded as follows:

	1	2	3	4	5	6	7	8	PP
Race 1	10	8	6	5	4	3	2	1	**1**
Race 2	6	5	4	3	2	1	0		0

Pos	Driver	HOC1 (Germany)		LAU (Germany)		NOR (Germany)		ZAN (Netherlands)		OSC (Germany)		NÜR (Germany)		BRH (United Kingdom)		CAT (Spain)		DIJ (France)		HOC2 (Germany)		Points
1	(France) Jules Bianchi	5	3	1	14	1	3	**1**	1	**1**	6	**1**	5	Ret	Ret	**1**	5	**2**	1	**1**	7	114
2	(Germany) Christian Vietoris	7	2	8	1	6	1	3	4	4	1	8	2	3	4	6	4	1	6			75
3	(Finland) Valtteri Bottas	Ret	16	**2**	13	12	Ret	2	6	2	8	2	4	**2**	15	4	6	16	Ret	2	5	62
4	(United Kingdom) Alexander Sims	17	8	Ret	22	**2**	16	13	9	5	4	7	1	4	2	2	2	8	4	6	14†	54
5	(France) Jean-Karl Vernay	6	1	3	12	7	2	4	5	6	7	6	15	13	8	Ret	14	18	Ret	3	1	47
6	(Finland) Mika Mäki	4	4	12	6	Ret	15	Ret	19	8	3	5	3	1	6	10	13	3	Ret	5	Ret	43
7	(Spain) Roberto Merhi	2	10	6	2	5	8	18	11	3	5	17	Ret	9	11	9	Ret	5	2	4	13†	42
8	(United Kingdom) Sam Bird	**3**	6	5	3	8	Ret	8	2	12	20	4	8	6	3	Ret	Ret	6	5			40
9	(Mexico) Esteban Gutiérrez	16	Ret	24	11	4	12	5	7	9	9	3	6	7	5	Ret	9	12	3	11	6	26
10	(Monaco) Stefano Coletti	1	5	15	23	DSQ^{1}	EX	Ret	12	7	2	9	10			Ret	15	21†	Ret	10	9	19
11	(New Zealand) Brendon Hartley	19	Ret	4	4	Ret	11	10	8	21	21	22	17	8	1			Ret	11			15
12	(Netherlands) Henkie Waldschmidt	22†	9	7	5	9	6	6	17	11	10	10	7	15	13	5	7	13	Ret	8	8	13
13	(Switzerland) Christopher Zanella	14	Ret	14	8	Ret	Ret	21†	16	13	Ret	14	Ret	5	7	14	12	7	12	19	2	11
14	(Italy) Andrea Caldarelli	15	Ret	23	20	21	Ret	NC	21	20	23	24	19	18	14	3	10	4	Ret	13	Ret	11
15	(Netherlands) Renger van der Zande									DSQ	13					8	1	Ret	13	Ret	16†	7
16	(Germany) Marco Wittmann	12	Ret	22	9	10	17	12	10	10	17	12	9	14	10	18	17	11	Ret	7	4	6
17	(Lebanon) Basil Shaaban	23†	13	20	21	11	19†	16	18	15	12	20	Ret	20	Ret	7	3	10	Ret	12	Ret	6
18	(United States) Jake Rosenzweig	Ret	Ret	21	15	15	18†	7	3	16	11	15	12	10	16	NC	19	Ret	Ret	Ret	15†	6
19	(Finland) Atte Mustonen	8	7	Ret	10	13	4	9	Ret			11	20	Ret	Ret							4
20	(Brazil) Tiago Geronimi	10	17†	9	24	Ret	5	Ret	22†	14	14	13	18	Ret	DNS	11	8	9	8	Ret	17†	2
21	(France) Adrien Tambay	13	Ret	11	7	19	7	11	Ret					12	Ret	17	Ret	20†	10	14	10	0
22	(Canada) Robert Wickens	11	11															14	7			0
23	(Italy) Matteo Chinosi	9	12	10	17	Ret	9	20†	23†													0
24	(Denmark) Johan Jokinen			DNS	18	Ret	14	19	Ret	19	Ret	19	16	19	18	13	Ret	17	9	18	11	0
25	(Brazil) César Ramos	24	Ret	17	Ret	16	10	17	13	23	15	DSQ	13	11	Ret	Ret	16					0
26	(Venezuela) Johnny Cecotto Jr.	21	Ret	16	Ret	17	Ret	15	20	17	19	16	11									0
27	(Brazil) Pedro Enrique	20	14	18	16	14	20†	14	14	22	19	DSQ	Ret	17	17	15	20	15	14	Ret	12	0
28	(United Kingdom) Nick Tandy					20	Ret	Ret	15	18	17	18	Ret	Ret	12	Ret	DNS					0
29	(Germany) Kevin Mirocha	Ret	15†	13	25	18	13	DNS	DNS													0
30	(France) Tom Dillmann									24	22	21	14					19	Ret	15	Ret	0
31	(Netherlands) Carlo van Dam	18	Ret	19	19											16	18					0
32	(France) Alexandre Marsoin	25†	Ret	Ret	Ret																	0
guest drivers ineligible for championship points
	(Italy) Mirko Bortolotti																			17	3	0
	(Germany) Tim Sandtler													16	9	12	11					0
	(Spain) Víctor García																			9	Ret	0
	(Germany) Nico Monien																			16	Ret	0
	(Italy) Edoardo Mortara																			Ret	Ret	0
Pos	Driver	HOC1 (Germany)		LAU (Germany)		NOR (Germany)		ZAN (Netherlands)		OSC (Germany)		NÜR (Germany)		BRH (United Kingdom)		CAT (Spain)		DIJ (France)		HOC2 (Germany)		Points

Colour	Result
Gold	Winner
Silver	Second place
Bronze	Third place
Green	Points classification
Blue	Non-points classification
Blue	Non-classified finish (NC)
Purple	Retired, not classified (Ret)
Red	Did not qualify (DNQ)
Red	Did not pre-qualify (DNPQ)
Black	Disqualified (DSQ)
White	Did not start (DNS)
White	Withdrew (WD)
White	Race cancelled (C)
Blank	Did not practice (DNP)
Blank	Did not arrive (DNA)
Blank	Excluded (EX)

**Bold** – Pole
Italics – Fastest Lap
**R** – Rookie Cup

† — Drivers did not finish the race, but were classified as they completed over 90% of the race distance.

- Pole-winners in **bold**; race 1 pole-winners earn one point, except at Brands Hatch.
- Drivers achieving fastest lap in italics. No points awarded.
- ^{1} – Stefano Coletti was disqualified from the first race at the Norisring, due to a post-race altercation with Jules Bianchi. Coletti was excluded from the meeting, and no driver was awarded third place points.

=== Team Standings ===
Pos	Team	HOC1 (Germany)		LAU (Germany)		NOR (Germany)		ZAN (Netherlands)		OSC (Germany)		NÜR (Germany)		BRH (United Kingdom)		CAT (Spain)		DIJ (France)		HOC2 (Germany)		Points
1	(France) ART Grand Prix	5	3	1	7	1	3	1	1	1	6	1	4	2	5	1	5	2	1	1	5	183
1	(France) ART Grand Prix	13	16	2	11	4	7	2	6	2	8	2	5	7	15	4	6	12	3	2	6	183
2	(Germany) Mücke Motorsport	3	2	5	1	2	1	3	2	4	1	4	1	3	2	2	2	1	4	6	4	163
2	(Germany) Mücke Motorsport	7	6	8	3	6	16	8	4	5	4	7	2	4	3	6	4	6	5	7	14	163
3	(France) Signature	4	1	3	6	7	2	4	5	6	3	5	3	1	6	10	8	3	8	3	1	92
3	(France) Signature	6	4	9	12	Ret	5	Ret	19	8	7	6	15	13	8	11	13	9	Ret	5	17	92
4	(United Kingdom) Manor Motorsport	2	10	6	2	5	8	14	11	3	5	12	13	9	11	9	16	5	2	4	12	42
4	(United Kingdom) Manor Motorsport	20	14	17	16	14	10	17	13	23	15	18	Ret	11	17	15	20	15	14	Ret	13	42
5	(Italy) Prema Powerteam	1	5	10	17	11	9	16	12	7	2	9	10	16	9	7	3	10	Ret	9	9	25
5	(Italy) Prema Powerteam	9	12	15	21	Ret	19	20	18	15	12	21	Ret	20	Ret	12	11	19	Ret	10	Ret	25
6	(France) SG Formula	15	9	7	5	9	6	6	17	11	10	10	7	15	13	3	7	4	Ret	8	8	24
6	(France) SG Formula	22	Ret	23	20	21	Ret	Ret	21	21	23	25	19	18	14	5	10	13	Ret	13	Ret	24
7	(Germany) Motopark Academy	8	7	14	8	13	4	9	16	13	13	11	20	5	7	8	1	7	12	19	2	22
7	(Germany) Motopark Academy	14	Ret	Ret	10	Ret	Ret	21	Ret	17	Ret	15	Ret	Ret	Ret	14	12	Ret	13	Ret	16	22
8	(United Kingdom) Carlin Motorsport	19	Ret	4	4	15	11	7	3	16	11	16	12	8	1	Ret	19	Ret	11	17	3	21
8	(United Kingdom) Carlin Motorsport	Ret	Ret	21	15	Ret	18	10	8	22	16	23	17	10	16			Ret	Ret	Ret	15	21
9	(Germany) Kolles & Heinz Union	11	11	19	18	20	14	19	15	19	17	19	16	19	12	13	Ret	14	7	18	11	0
9	(Germany) Kolles & Heinz Union	18	Ret	DNS	19	Ret	Ret	Ret	Ret	20	Ret	20	Ret	Ret	19	Ret	DNS	17	9	Ret	Ret	0
10	(Austria) HBR Motorsport	21	15	13	25	17	13	15	20	18	19	17	11							15	Ret	0
10	(Austria) HBR Motorsport	Ret	Ret	16	Ret	18	Ret	DNS	DNS	25	22	22	14									0
Pos	Team	HOC1 (Germany)		LAU (Germany)		NOR (Germany)		ZAN (Netherlands)		OSC (Germany)		NÜR (Germany)		BRH (United Kingdom)		CAT (Spain)		DIJ (France)		HOC2 (Germany)		Points

=== Nations Cup ===
	Nation	Points
1	France	155
2	Finland	108
3	Great Britain	92
4	Germany	81
5	Spain	42
6	Mexico	26
7	Netherlands	20
8	Monaco	19
9	New Zealand	15
10	Switzerland	11
11	Italy	11
12	Lebanon	6
13	United States	6
14	Brazil	2

== See also ==
- 2009 Masters of Formula 3
- 2009 Macau Grand Prix Formula Three
