= Adrien Tambay =

French racing driver

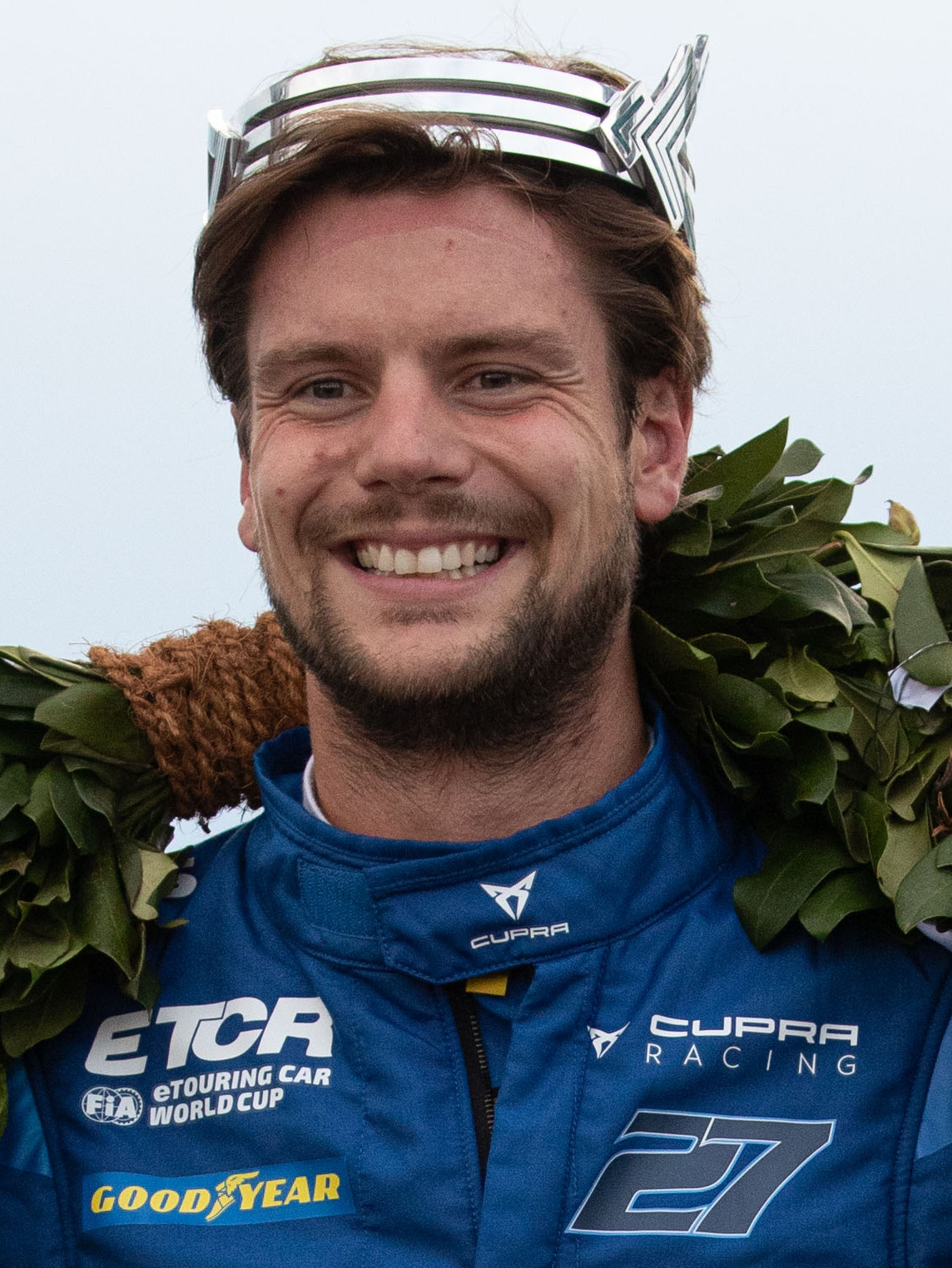
- Tambay in 2022
- Nationality: (France) French
- Born: Adrien Patrick Marie Maurice Tambay; 25 February 1991 (age 35) Paris, France
- Relatives: Patrick Tambay (father)

DTM
- Categorisation: FIA Gold (until 2013, 2019–); FIA Platinum (2014–2018)
- Years active: 2012–2016
- Former teams: Abt Sportsline
- Starts: 65
- Wins: 0
- Podiums: 3
- Poles: 1
- Fastest laps: 1
- Best finish: 10th in 2012

Previous series
- 2011 2010–2011 2010 2009 2008 2007: World Series by Renault; Auto GP; GP3 Series; Formula 3 Euro Series; Formula BMW Europe; Formula BMW ADAC

Championship titles
- 2022: FIA ETCR - eTouring Car World Cup

Adrien Patrick Marie Maurice Tambay (born 25 February 1991) is a French professional racing driver. He currently is an official CUPRA driver and is the 2022 ETCR Champion. He is the son of former Formula One driver Patrick Tambay, who won two Grands Prix for Ferrari in the early 1980s.

== Career ==
=== Formula BMW ===
Born in Paris, Tambay began his car racing career in the German Formula BMW ADAC series, finishing fourth and rookie champion. He moved to the new Formula BMW Europe series in 2008, where he finished third behind Esteban Gutiérrez and Marco Wittmann.

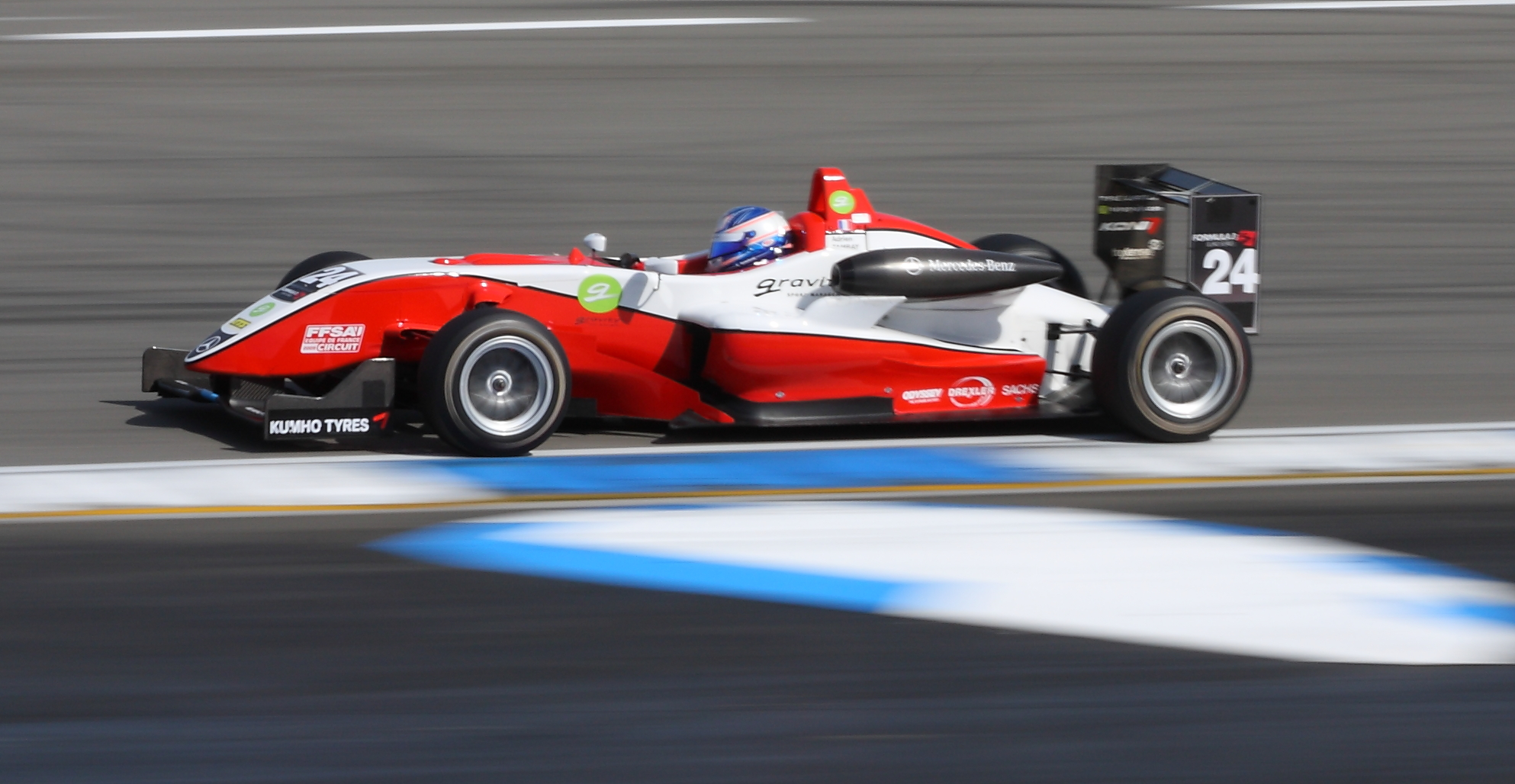
Tambay on the Formula Three Euroseries at the Hockenheimring (2009)

=== Formula Three ===
In 2009, Tambay raced in the Formula Three Euroseries for leading team ART Grand Prix. He missed the Oschersleben and Nürburgring rounds of the Euroseries, and also an invitational entry to the British Formula 3 Championship at Spa, due to a head injury suffered while playing football. He ended the Euroseries season pointless, recording a best finish of seventh at EuroSpeedway and the Norisring.

=== Auto GP ===
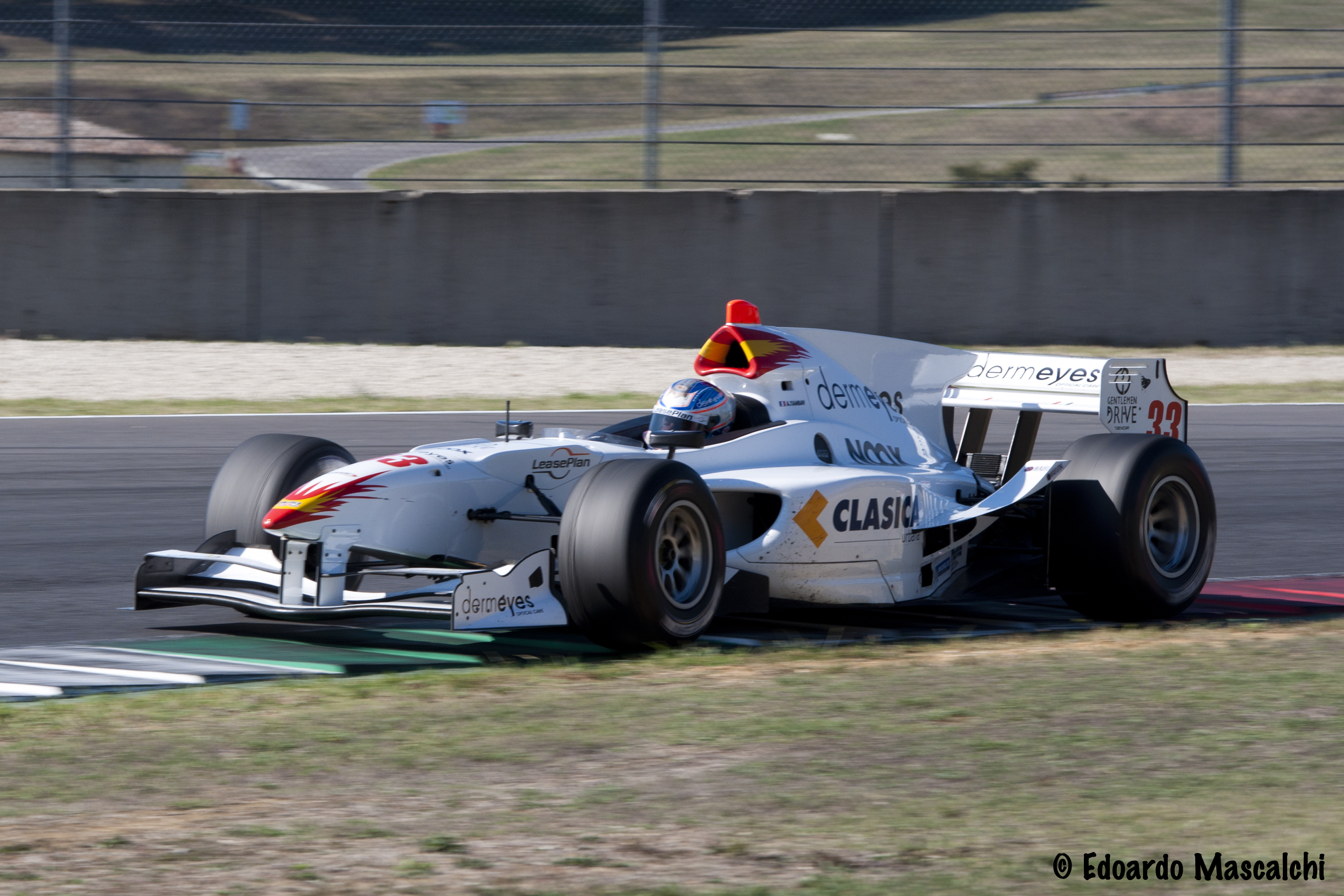
Tambay achieved his only win of the 2011 Auto GP season for Campos Racing, at Mugello.

In 2010, Tambay raced in the Auto GP series for Charouz-Gravity Racing.

=== GP3 ===
After James Jakes had a wrist injury at Hockenheim, Tambay was called in to replace him in Manor Racing. In his second outing at Spa-Francorchamps, Tambay retired first race and therefore started 27th in the second race. The rain started during the race, but Tambay kept driving on slicks, and winning the race ahead of Alexander Rossi.

=== DTM ===
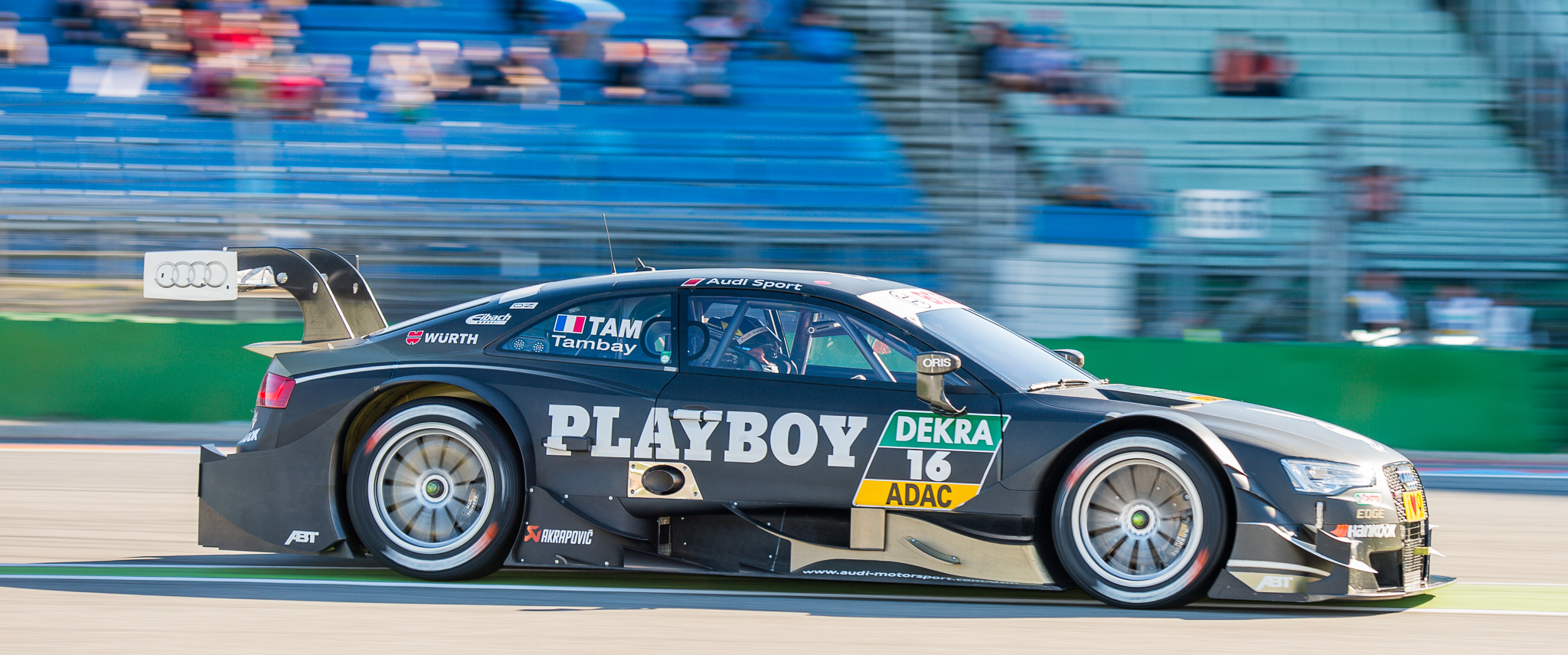
Adrien Tambay, Deutsche Tourenwagen Masters 2014 - Hockenheimring

Tambay was one of the eight Audi factory drivers in the DTM championship for five years between 2012 and 2016. He scored a top-ten championship finish in his first year and amassed a total of three podiums, one pole position and one fastest lap throughout his DTM career.

== Racing record ==
=== Career summary ===
Season	Series	Team	Races	Wins	Poles	F/Laps	Podiums	Points	Position
2007	Formula BMW ADAC	Josef Kaufmann Racing	18	2	2	0	7	573	4th
2007	Formula BMW USA	EuroInternational	4	0	0	1	2	109	17th
2007	Formula BMW World Final	EuroInternational	1	0	0	0	0	N/A	14th
2008	Formula BMW Europe	Eifelland Racing	16	2	2	0	9	260	**3rd**
2008	Formula BMW Americas	EuroInternational	3	1	0	1	3	0	NC†
2009	Formula 3 Euro Series	ART Grand Prix	16	0	0	0	0	0	21st
2009	British Formula 3 International Series	ART Grand Prix	2	0	0	0	0	0	NC†
2009	Masters of Formula 3	ART Grand Prix	1	0	0	0	0	N/A	DNF
2010	GP3 Series	Manor Racing	4	1	0	0	1	6	20th
2010	Auto GP Series	Charouz-Gravity Racing	12	1	0	1	2	29	6th
2011	Formula Renault 3.5 Series	Pons Racing	1	0	0	0	0	6	27th
2011	Formula Renault 3.5 Series	International DracoRacing	1	0	0	0	0	6	27th
2011	Auto GP Series	DAMS	6	0	0	0	2	114	4th
2011	Auto GP Series	Campos Racing	6	1	1	0	3	114	4th
2011	FIA GT3 European Championship	Saintéloc Racing	2	0	0	0	0	0	48th
2012	Deutsche Tourenwagen Masters	Audi Sport Team Abt	10	0	0	0	1	28	10th
2012	Blancpain Endurance Series - Pro-Am	Saintéloc Racing	1	0	0	0	0	0	NC
2013	Deutsche Tourenwagen Masters	Audi Sport Team Abt	10	0	0	1	0	30	14th
2014	Deutsche Tourenwagen Masters	Audi Sport Team Abt	10	0	1	0	1	36	14th
2015	Deutsche Tourenwagen Masters	Audi Sport Team Abt	18	0	0	0	0	3	24th
2015	Blancpain Endurance Series - Pro	Saintéloc	1	0	0	0	0	0	NC
2016	Deutsche Tourenwagen Masters	Audi Sport Team Rosberg	17	0	0	0	1	40	18th
2016	Blancpain GT Series Endurance Cup	Belgian Audi Club Team WRT	1	0	0	0	0	0	NC
2018	Blancpain GT Series Endurance Cup	Strakka Racing	3	0	0	0	0	8	40th
2018	Intercontinental GT Challenge	Strakka Racing	2	0	0	0	0	12	20th
2019	European Le Mans Series - LMP2	Inter Europol Competition	2	0	0	0	0	0.5	35th
2019	French GT4 Cup - Pro-Am	Cool Racing	6	0	0	1	0	24	16th
2020	French GT4 Cup - Pro-Am	Saintéloc Racing	12	0	1	4	0	23	14th
2020	24 Hours of Le Mans - LMP2	EuroInternational	1	0	0	0	0	N/A	DNF
2021	GT World Challenge Europe Endurance Cup	Saintéloc Racing	5	0	0	0	0	0	NC
2021	French GT4 Cup - Pro-Am	Saintéloc Racing	12	0	0	1	1	38	15th
2022	GT4 European Series - Pro-Am	Saintéloc Racing	2	0	0	0	0	0	NC
2022	FIA ETCR – eTouring Car World Cup	Cupra EKS	6	1	N/A	N/A	5	535	**1st**
2022–23	Andros Trophy - Elite Pro Class	DRP	3	0	0	0	0	113	14th
2022–23	Formula E	ABT CUPRA Formula E Team	Test driver						
2023	Extreme E Championship	Abt Cupra XE	1	0	N/A	N/A	0	6	18th
2023–24	Formula E	ABT CUPRA Formula E Team	Test driver						
2025	Extreme E Championship	—N/a	Reserve driver						

† As Tambay was a guest driver, he was ineligible to score points.

=== Complete Formula 3 Euro Series results ===
(key) (Races in bold indicate pole position; races in italics indicate fastest lap)

Year	Entrant	Chassis	Engine	1	2	3	4	5	6	7	8	9	10	11	12	13	14	15	16	17	18	19	20	DC	Points
2009	ART Grand Prix	Dallara F308/040	Mercedes	HOC; 1; 13	HOC; 2 Ret	LAU; 1; 11	LAU; 2; 7	NOR; 1; 19	NOR; 2; 7	ZAN; 1; 11	ZAN; 2 Ret	OSC; 1	OSC; 2	NÜR; 1	NÜR; 2	BRH; 1; 12	BRH; 2 Ret	CAT; 1; 17	CAT; 2 Ret	DIJ; 1; 20†	DIJ; 2; 10	HOC; 1; 14	HOC; 2; 10	21st	0

† Driver did not finish the race, but was classified as he completed over 90% of the race distance.

=== Complete Auto GP Results ===
(key) (Races in bold indicate pole position) (Races in italics indicate fastest lap)

Year	Entrant	1	2	3	4	5	6	7	8	9	10	11	12	13	14	Pos	Points
2010	Charouz-Gravity Racing	BRN; 1; 6	BRN; 2 Ret	IMO; 1; 1	IMO; 2; 4	SPA; 1 Ret	SPA; 2; 10	MAG; 1; 14	MAG; 2; 10	NAV; 1 Ret	NAV; 2; 5	MNZ; 1; 2	MNZ; 2; 5			6th	29
2011	DAMS	MNZ; 1 Ret	MNZ; 2; 2	HUN; 1; 2	HUN; 2; 4	BRN; 1 Ret	BRN; 2; 8	DON; 1	DON; 2							4th	114
2011	Campos Racing									OSC; 1; 2	OSC; 2; 3	VAL; 1; 6	VAL; 2; 4	**MUG**; **1**; 1	MUG; 2; 6	4th	114

=== Complete GP3 Series results ===
(key) (Races in bold indicate pole position) (Races in italics indicate fastest lap)

Year	Entrant	1	2	3	4	5	6	7	8	9	10	11	12	13	14	15	16	DC	Points
2010	Manor Racing	CAT; FEA	CAT; SPR	IST; FEA	IST; SPR	VAL; FEA	VAL; SPR	SIL; FEA	SIL; SPR	HOC; FEA	HOC; SPR	HUN; FEA; 18	HUN; SPR; 9	SPA; FEA; Ret	SPA; SPR; 1	MNZ; FEA	MNZ; SPR	20th	6

=== Complete Formula Renault 3.5 Series results ===
(key)

Year	Team	1	2	3	4	5	6	7	8	9	10	11	12	13	14	15	16	17	Pos	Points
2011	Pons Racing	ALC; 1	ALC; 2	SPA; 1	SPA; 2	MNZ; 1	MNZ; 2	MON; 1; 7	NÜR; 1	NÜR; 2	HUN; 1	HUN; 2	SIL; 1	SIL; 2	LEC; 1	LEC; 2			27th	6
2011	International DracoRacing																CAT; 1 DNS	CAT; 2 Ret	27th	6

=== Complete Deutsche Tourenwagen Masters results ===
(key) (Races in bold indicate pole position) (Races in italics indicate fastest lap)

Year	Team	Car	1	2	3	4	5	6	7	8	9	10	11	12	13	14	15	16	17	18	Pos	Points
2012	Audi Sport Team Abt	Audi A5 DTM	HOC; Ret	LAU; 18	BRH; 12	SPL; Ret	NOR; 15	NÜR; Ret	ZAN; 5	OSC; 16	VAL; 2	HOC; Ret									10th	28
2013	Audi Sport Team Abt	Audi RS5 DTM	HOC; Ret	BRH; 18	SPL; 11	LAU; 11	NOR; 15	MSC; 4	NÜR; 6	OSC; 9	ZAN; 6	HOC; 14									14th	30
2014	Audi Sport Team Abt Sportsline	Audi RS5 DTM	**HOC**; 3	OSC; 10	HUN; 5	NOR; 9	MSC; Ret	SPL; 6	NÜR; 11	LAU; 18†	ZAN; Ret	HOC; 19†									14th	36
2015	Audi Sport Team Abt Sportsline	Audi RS5 DTM	HOC; 1; 15	HOC; 2 Ret	LAU; 1; 16	LAU; 2; 20	NOR; 1; 19	NOR; 2; 14	ZAN; 1; 18	ZAN; 2; 9	SPL; 1; 10	SPL; 2; 16	MSC; 1 Ret	MSC; 2; 16	OSC; 1; 17	OSC; 2; 14	NÜR; 1; 14	NÜR; 2; 12	HOC; 1 Ret	HOC; 2 Ret	24th	3
2016	Audi Sport Team Rosberg	Audi RS5 DTM	HOC; 1 Ret	HOC; 2; 13	SPL; 1; 8	SPL; 2; 11	LAU; 1; 20	LAU; 2; 20	NOR; 1; 7	NOR; 2 DSQ	ZAN; 1 Ret	ZAN; 2	MSC; 1; 12	MSC; 2; 8	NÜR; 1 Ret	NÜR; 2; 15	HUN; 1; 6	HUN; 2; 2	HOC; 1; 12	HOC; 2 Ret	18th	40

^{†} Driver did not finish, but completed 75% of the race distance.

=== Complete European Le Mans Series results ===
(key) (Races in bold indicate pole position; results in italics indicate fastest lap)

Year	Entrant	Class	Chassis	Engine	1	2	3	4	5	6	Rank	Points
2019	Inter Europol Competition	LMP2	Ligier JS P217	Gibson GK428 4.2 L V8	LEC	MNZ	CAT; Ret	SIL; 12	SPA	ALG	35th	0.5

=== Complete 24 Hours of Le Mans results ===
Year	Team	Co-Drivers	Car	Class	Laps	Pos.	Class Pos.
2020	(United States) Eurointernational	(Belgium) Christophe D'Ansembourg (France) Erik Maris	Ligier JS P217-Gibson	LMP2	26	DNF	DNF

=== Complete Extreme E results ===
(key)

Year	Team	Car	1	2	3	4	5	6	7	8	9	10	Pos.	Points
2023	Abt Cupra XE	Spark ODYSSEY 21	DES; 1	DES; 2	HYD; 1	HYD; 2	ISL1; 1	ISL1; 2	ISL2; 1	ISL2; 2	COP; 1 DNS	COP; 2; 7	18th	6
