= Kevin Mirocha =

Polish-German racing driver (born 1991)

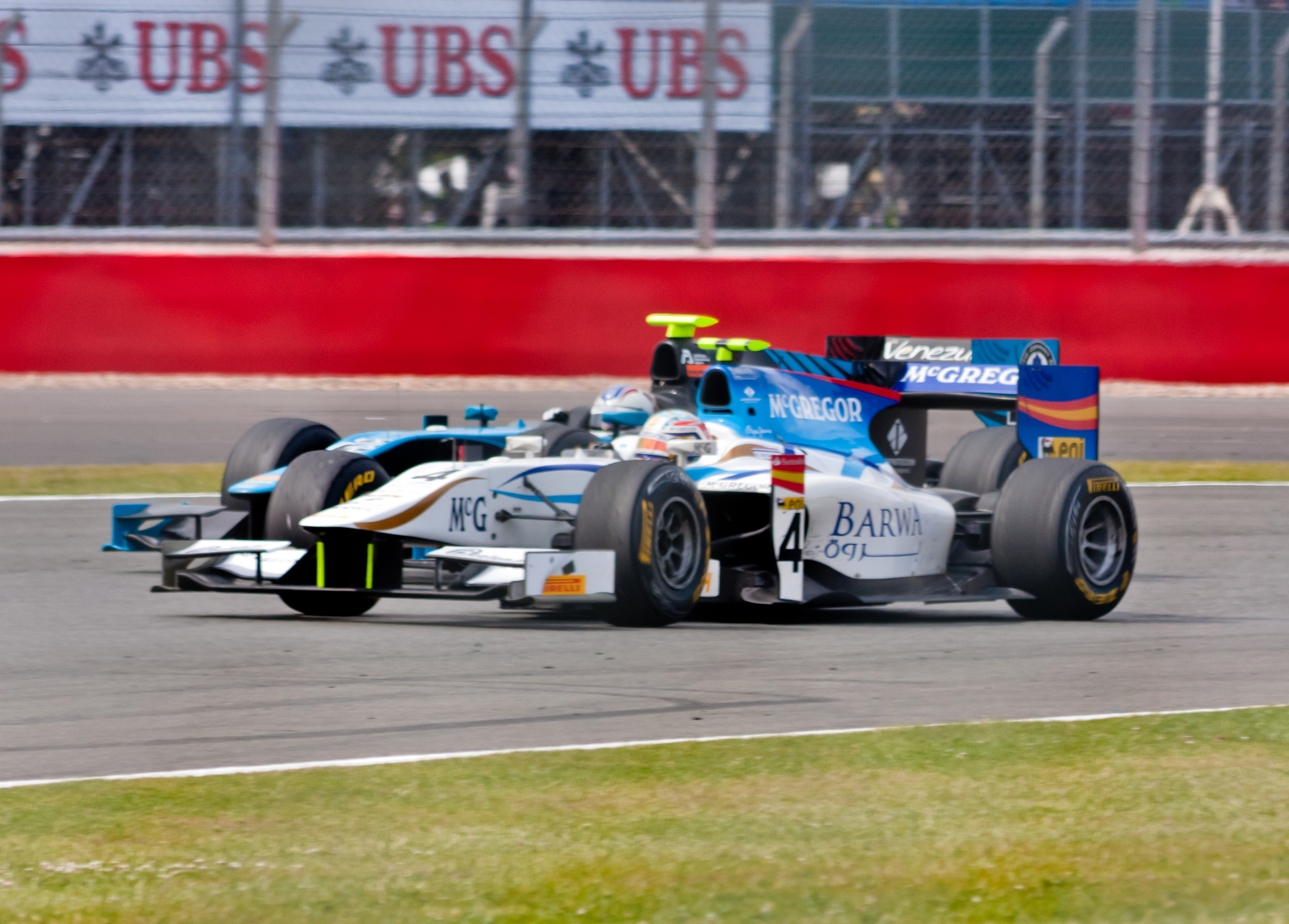
- Giedo van der Garde (front) and Kevin Mirocha (background) during 2011 GP2 Series round at Silverstone Circuit
- Nationality: (Poland) Polish (Germany) German via dual nationality
- Born: 7 October 1991 (age 35) Hamm (Germany)

Previous series
- 2012 2011 2010 2009 2008 2007: FIA Formula Two Championship; GP2 Series; Formula Renault 2.0 NEC; Formula 3 Euro Series; ATS Formel 3 Cup; Formula BMW ADAC

Kevin Mirocha (born 7 October 1991 in Hamm, Germany) is a Polish-German racing driver.

== Early life ==
During childhood, Mirocha raced karts in Koszalin, Poland.

== Career ==
=== Formula BMW ===
Despite beginning his karting career in 2001, 2007 saw his debut in the Formula BMW ADAC championship with ADAC Berlin-Brandenburg. Mirocha finished eighth in the championship and third in the Rookie Cup with one podium at EuroSpeedway Lausitz.

=== Formula Three ===
In 2008, Mirocha stepped up to the ATS Formel 3 Cup with Josef Kaufmann Racing. He finished sixth in the standings after taking four podium places. Mirocha moved to HBR Motorsport and the Formula 3 Euro Series in 2009 but left the series pointless, after failing to start either race at the Zandvoort round.

=== Formula Renault ===
Mirocha competed in seven of the twenty races that comprised the 2010 Formula Renault 2.0 NEC season for the SL Formula Racing team, winning the final race of the season at the Nürburgring. He finished ninth in the championship, the third best-placed driver who did not contest all the rounds of the championship.

=== GP2 Series ===
Mirocha moved up to the GP2 Series with the Ocean Racing Technology team for 2011, driving alongside Johnny Cecotto Jr. He did not start either race at Silverstone after injuring his left shoulder. After fourteen races, he was replaced by Brendon Hartley. Despite this, he finished the season 22nd in the drivers' championship, the highest-placed of those not to score any points.

=== FIA Formula 2 ===
In 2012, Mirocha competed in FIA Formula 2. He had a strong rookie season and took his maiden Formula 2 victory at Brands Hatch.

== Racing record ==
=== Career summary ===
Season	Series	Team	Races	Wins	Poles	F/Laps	Podiums	Points	Position
2007	Formula BMW ADAC	ADAC Berlin-Brandenburg	18	0	0	0	1	389	8th
2007	Formula BMW World Final	Josef Kaufmann Racing	1	0	0	0	0	N/A	22nd
2008	ATS Formel 3 Cup	Josef Kaufmann Racing	18	0	0	0	4	56	6th
2009	Formula 3 Euro Series	HBR Motorsport	6	0	0	0	0	0	29th
2010	Formula Renault 2.0 NEC	SL Formula Racing	8	1	0	2	3	137	9th
2011	GP2 Series	Ocean Racing Technology	14	0	0	0	0	0	22nd
2012	FIA Formula Two Championship	Motorsport Vision	16	1	1	0	6	159.5	6th
2022	Indian Racing League	Goa Aces	4	0	0	0	2	63	12th
2025	Lamborghini Super Trofeo Europe - Pro-Am	GT3 Poland	2	0	0	0	0	0	NC†

=== Complete Formula 3 Euro Series results ===
(key)

Year	Entrant	Chassis	Engine	1	2	3	4	5	6	7	8	9	10	11	12	13	14	15	16	17	18	19	20	DC	Points
2009	HBR Motorsport	Dallara F308/021	Mercedes	HOC1; 1 Ret	HOC1; 2; 15	LAU; 1; 13	LAU; 2; 25	NOR; 1; 18	NOR; 2; 13	ZAN; 1 DNS	ZAN; 2 DNS	OSC; 1	OSC; 2	NÜR; 1	NÜR; 2	BRH; 1	BRH; 2	CAT; 1	CAT; 2	DIJ; 1	DIJ; 2	HOC2; 1	HOC2; 2	29th	0

=== Complete Eurocup Formula Renault 2.0 results ===
(key) (Races in bold indicate pole position; races in italics indicate fastest lap)

Year	Entrant	1	2	3	4	5	6	7	8	9	10	11	12	13	14	15	16	DC	Points
2010	SL Formula Racing	ALC; 1	ALC; 2	SPA; 1	SPA; 2	BRN; 1	BRN; 2	MAG; 1	MAG; 2	HUN; 1	HUN; 2	HOC; 1; 9	HOC; 2; 11	SIL; 1	SIL; 2	CAT; 1	CAT; 2	NC†	0

† As Mirocha was a guest driver, he was ineligible for points

=== Complete Formula Renault 2.0 NEC results ===
(key) (Races in bold indicate pole position) (Races in italics indicate fastest lap)

Year	Entrant	1	2	3	4	5	6	7	8	9	10	11	12	13	14	15	16	17	18	19	20	DC	Points
2010	SL Formula Racing	HOC; 1	HOC; 2	BRN; 1	BRN; 2	ZAN; 1	ZAN; 2	OSC; 1; 5	OSC; 2; 7	OSC; 3; 4	ASS; 1; 2	ASS; 2; 5	MST; 1	MST; 2	MST; 3	SPA; 1	SPA; 2	SPA; 3	NÜR; 1; 3	**NÜR**; **2**; 1	NÜR; 3 C	9th	137

=== Complete GP2 Series results ===
(key) (Races in bold indicate pole position) (Races in italics indicate fastest lap)

Year	Entrant	1	2	3	4	5	6	7	8	9	10	11	12	13	14	15	16	17	18	DC	Points
2011	Ocean Racing Technology	IST; FEA; 15	IST; SPR; 19	CAT; FEA; 21	CAT; SPR; 16	MON; FEA; 10	MON; SPR; Ret	VAL; FEA; 12	VAL; SPR; 8	SIL; FEA; DNS	SIL; SPR; DNS	NÜR; FEA; Ret	NÜR; SPR; 13	HUN; FEA; 14	HUN; SPR; 8	SPA; FEA	SPA; SPR	MNZ; FEA	MNZ; SPR	22nd	0

=== Complete FIA Formula Two Championship results ===
(key) (Races in bold indicate pole position) (Races in italics indicate fastest lap)

Year	1	2	3	4	5	6	7	8	9	10	11	12	13	14	15	16	Pos	Points	Ref
2012	SIL; 1; 12	SIL; 2; 11	ALG; 1; 3	ALG; 2; 8	NÜR; 1; 4	NÜR; 2; 10	SPA; 1 Ret	SPA; 2; 3	BRH; 1; 1	BRH; 2; 4	LEC; 1; 6	LEC; 2; 4	**HUN**; **1**; 2	HUN; 2; 4	MNZ; 1; 3	MNZ; 2; 2	6th	159.5	

=== Complete Indian Racing League results ===
(key) (Races in bold indicate pole position) (Races in italics indicate fastest lap)

Year	Franchise	1	2	3	4	5	6	7	8	9	10	11	12	Pos.	Pts
2022	Goa Aces	HYD1; 1 C	HYD1; 2 C	HYD1; 3 C	IRU1; 1	IRU1; 2	IRU1; 3	IRU2; 1	IRU2; 2; 11	IRU2; 3; 7	HYD2; 1	HYD2; 2; 3	HYD2; 3; 2	12th	63
