= 2006 Formula BMW ADAC season =

2006 Formula BMW ADAC

Seasons
- ← 2005 2007 →

The 2006 Formula BMW ADAC season was a multi-event motor racing championship for open wheel, formula racing cars held across Europe. The championship featured drivers competing in 1.2 litre Formula BMW single seat race cars. The 2006 season was the ninth Formula BMW ADAC season organized by BMW Motorsport and ADAC. The season began at Hockenheimring on 8 April and finished at the same place on 29 October, after eighteen races.

Christian Vietoris was crowned series champion.

== Driver lineup ==
| Team | No. | Driver | Class | Rounds |
|---|---|---|---|---|
| (Germany) AM-Holzer Rennsport GmbH | 1 | (Germany) Marco Holzer | | All |
| (Germany) AM-Holzer Rennsport GmbH | 16 | (Germany) Christian Zacherl | | 1–8 |
| (Germany) AM-Holzer Rennsport GmbH | 17 | (Germany) Dominik Wasem | | All |
| (Germany) ADAC Berlin-Brandenburg | 2 | (Austria) Martin Ragginger | R | 1–2, 4–6 |
| (Germany) ADAC Berlin-Brandenburg | 3 | (Monaco) Stefano Coletti | | 1–8 |
| (Germany) ADAC Berlin-Brandenburg | 4 | (Japan) Yoshitaka Kuroda | | 1–2, 4–9 |
| (Germany) ADAC Berlin-Brandenburg | 5 | (Austria) Philipp Eng | R | All |
| (Germany) ADAC Berlin-Brandenburg | 6 | (Germany) Tobias Hegewald | | All |
| (Germany) ADAC Berlin-Brandenburg | 7 | (Mexico) Sergio Pérez | | All |
| (Germany) ADAC Berlin-Brandenburg | 24 | (Canada) Robert Wickens | | 3 |
| (Germany) ADAC Berlin-Brandenburg | 25 | (United Kingdom) Oliver Oakes | | 3 |
| (Germany) Josef Kaufmann Racing | 8 | (Germany) Christian Vietoris | | All |
| (Germany) Josef Kaufmann Racing | 9 | (Germany) Patrick Kronenberger | R | 1–5 |
| (Germany) Josef Kaufmann Racing | 10 | (Netherlands) Nick de Bruijn | | All |
| (Germany) Josef Kaufmann Racing | 18 | (Spain) Daniel Campos-Hull | | 6–9 |
| (Germany) Eifelland Racing | 11 | (Germany) Jens Klingmann | R | All |
| (Germany) Eifelland Racing | 12 | (Finland) Mika Mäki | | All |
| (Germany) Eifelland Racing | 14 | (Russia) Oskar Paegle | R | 1–7 |
| (Germany) Eifelland Racing | 27 | (Colombia) Sebastián Saavedra | R | 6 |
| (Germany) Eifelland Racing | 30 | (Austria) Martin Ragginger | | 7–9 |
| (Germany) Team Rosberg | 15 | (Switzerland) Fabio Leimer | R | 1–6 |
| (Finland) Matson Motorsport | 15 | (Switzerland) Fabio Leimer | R | 7–9 |
| (Czech Republic) Micanek Motorsport | 18 | (Czech Republic) Josef Král | R | All |
| (Germany) GU-Racing Motorsportteam | 19 | (Germany) Maximilian Wissel | | All |
| (Germany) GU-Racing Motorsportteam | 21 | (Romania) Andrei Harnagea | | 1–3, 5–9 |
| (Germany) GU-Racing Motorsportteam | 22 | (Germany) Jens Höing | | All |
| (Germany) GU-Racing Motorsportteam | 23 | (United States) Jules Duc | | 5 |
| (Germany) GU-Racing Motorsportteam | 26 | (Austria) Bernd Herndlhofer | | 6–9 |
| (Switzerland) Devis Schwägli | 20 | (Switzerland) Devis Schwägli | R | 1–4 |

| Icon | Class |
|---|---|
| R | Rookie Cup |

== 2006 Schedule ==
The series supported the Deutsche Tourenwagen Masters at seven rounds, with additional rounds at the European Grand Prix on 5–7 May on 2–4 June and the WTCC Race of Germany.

| Round | | Location | Circuit | Date |
|---|---|---|---|---|
| 1 | R1 | Hockenheim, Germany | Hockenheimring | 8 April |
| 1 | R2 | Hockenheim, Germany | Hockenheimring | 9 April |
| 2 | R1 | Klettwitz, Germany | EuroSpeedway Lausitz | 29 April |
| 2 | R2 | Klettwitz, Germany | EuroSpeedway Lausitz | 30 April |
| 3 | R1 | Nürburg, Germany | Nürburgring | 6 May |
| 3 | R2 | Nürburg, Germany | Nürburgring | 7 May |
| 4 | R1 | Oschersleben, Germany | Motorsport Arena Oschersleben | 20 May |
| 4 | R2 | Oschersleben, Germany | Motorsport Arena Oschersleben | 21 May |
| 5 | R1 | Oschersleben, Germany | Motorsport Arena Oschersleben | 3 June |
| 5 | R2 | Oschersleben, Germany | Motorsport Arena Oschersleben | 4 June |
| 6 | R1 | Nuremberg, Germany | Norisring | 22 July |
| 6 | R2 | Nuremberg, Germany | Norisring | 23 July |
| 7 | R1 | Nürburg, Germany | Nürburgring | 19 August |
| 7 | R2 | Nürburg, Germany | Nürburgring | 20 August |
| 8 | R1 | Zandvoort, Netherlands | Circuit Park Zandvoort | 2 September |
| 8 | R2 | Zandvoort, Netherlands | Circuit Park Zandvoort | 3 September |
| 9 | R1 | Hockenheim, Germany | Hockenheimring | 28 October |
| 9 | R2 | Hockenheim, Germany | Hockenheimring | 29 October |

== Results ==
| Round | | Circuit | Pole position | Fastest lap | Winning driver | Winning team | Rookie winner |
|---|---|---|---|---|---|---|---|
| 1 | R1 | (Germany) Hockenheimring | (Germany) Christian Vietoris | (Germany) Marco Holzer | (Germany) Marco Holzer | (Germany) AM-Holzer Rennsport GmbH | (Austria) Philipp Eng |
| 1 | R2 | (Germany) Hockenheimring | (Germany) Marco Holzer | (Germany) Marco Holzer | (Germany) Marco Holzer | (Germany) AM-Holzer Rennsport GmbH | (Austria) Philipp Eng |
| 2 | R1 | (Germany) EuroSpeedway Lausitz | (Germany) Christian Vietoris | (Finland) Mika Mäki | (Germany) Christian Vietoris | (Germany) Josef Kaufmann Racing | (Austria) Philipp Eng |
| 2 | R2 | (Germany) EuroSpeedway Lausitz | (Finland) Mika Mäki | (Finland) Mika Mäki | (Germany) Christian Vietoris | (Germany) Josef Kaufmann Racing | (Austria) Philipp Eng |
| 3 | R1 | (Germany) Nürburgring | (Germany) Christian Vietoris | (Germany) Christian Vietoris | (Germany) Christian Vietoris | (Germany) Josef Kaufmann Racing | (Germany) Jens Klingmann |
| 3 | R2 | (Germany) Nürburgring | (Germany) Christian Vietoris | (Germany) Christian Vietoris | (Germany) Christian Vietoris | (Germany) Josef Kaufmann Racing | (Germany) Jens Klingmann |
| 4 | R1 | (Germany) Motorsport Arena Oschersleben | (Germany) Christian Vietoris | (Monaco) Stefano Coletti | (Germany) Christian Vietoris | (Germany) Josef Kaufmann Racing | (Switzerland) Fabio Leimer |
| 4 | R2 | (Germany) Motorsport Arena Oschersleben | (Germany) Christian Vietoris | (Germany) Marco Holzer | (Germany) Marco Holzer | (Germany) AM-Holzer Rennsport GmbH | (Germany) Jens Klingmann |
| 5 | R1 | (Germany) Motorsport Arena Oschersleben | (Germany) Dominik Wasem | (Austria) Martin Ragginger | (Monaco) Stefano Coletti | (Germany) ADAC Berlin-Brandenburg | (Germany) Maximilian Wissel |
| 5 | R2 | (Germany) Motorsport Arena Oschersleben | (Germany) Jens Klingmann | (Monaco) Stefano Coletti | (Germany) Christian Vietoris | (Germany) Josef Kaufmann Racing | (Germany) Jens Klingmann |
| 6 | R1 | (Germany) Norisring | (Finland) Mika Mäki | (Finland) Mika Mäki | (Finland) Mika Mäki | (Germany) Eifelland Racing | (Germany) Jens Klingmann |
| 6 | R2 | (Germany) Norisring | (Finland) Mika Mäki | (Netherlands) Nick de Bruijn | (Finland) Mika Mäki | (Germany) Eifelland Racing | (Germany) Jens Klingmann |
| 7 | R1 | (Germany) Nürburgring | (Netherlands) Nick de Bruijn | (Netherlands) Nick de Bruijn | (Netherlands) Nick de Bruijn | (Germany) Josef Kaufmann Racing | (Austria) Philipp Eng |
| 7 | R2 | (Germany) Nürburgring | (Finland) Mika Mäki | (Netherlands) Nick de Bruijn | (Austria) Martin Ragginger | (Germany) Eifelland Racing | (Austria) Philipp Eng |
| 8 | R1 | (Netherlands) Circuit Park Zandvoort | (Germany) Christian Vietoris | (Germany) Christian Vietoris | (Germany) Christian Vietoris | (Germany) Josef Kaufmann Racing | (Germany) Maximilian Wissel |
| 8 | R2 | (Netherlands) Circuit Park Zandvoort | (Germany) Christian Vietoris | (Finland) Mika Mäki | (Germany) Christian Vietoris | (Germany) Josef Kaufmann Racing | (Germany) Jens Klingmann |
| 9 | R1 | (Germany) Hockenheimring | (Germany) Marco Holzer | (Austria) Martin Ragginger | (Austria) Martin Ragginger | (Germany) Eifelland Racing | (Germany) Jens Klingmann |
| 9 | R2 | (Germany) Hockenheimring | (Germany) Christian Vietoris | (Austria) Martin Ragginger | (Germany) Christian Vietoris | (Germany) Josef Kaufmann Racing | (Austria) Philipp Eng |

== Championship standings ==
- Points are awarded as follows:

| 1 | 2 | 3 | 4 | 5 | 6 | 7 | 8 | 9 | 10 |
|---|---|---|---|---|---|---|---|---|---|
| 20 | 15 | 12 | 10 | 8 | 6 | 4 | 3 | 2 | 1 |

| Pos | Driver | HOC1 (Germany) | | LAU (Germany) | | NÜR1 (Germany) | | OSC1 (Germany) | | OSC2 (Germany) | | NOR (Germany) | | NÜR2 (Germany) | | ZAN (Netherlands) | | HOC2 (Germany) | | Pts |
|---|---|---|---|---|---|---|---|---|---|---|---|---|---|---|---|---|---|---|---|---|
| 1 | (Germany) Christian Vietoris | **2** | 2 | **1** | 1 | **1** | **1** | **1** | **7** | 3 | 1 | 3 | 3 | 2 | 3 | **1** | **1** | Ret | **1** | 277 |
| 2 | (Finland) Mika Mäki | 3 | 3 | 2 | **2** | 4 | 5 | 9 | 13 | 6 | 4 | **1** | **1** | Ret | **4** | 2 | 2 | 3 | Ret | 182 |
| 3 | (Germany) Marco Holzer | 1 | **1** | 13 | 12 | 10 | 3 | 6 | 1 | 9 | 6 | 8 | Ret | 7 | 9 | 6 | 13 | **2** | 3 | 129 |
| 4 | (Germany) Jens Klingmann | 9 | 10 | Ret | 5 | 3 | 2 | 14 | 3 | 4 | **3** | 4 | 4 | 5 | 6 | Ret | 6 | 8 | 6 | 121 |
| 5 | (Netherlands) Nick de Bruijn | 4 | 6 | Ret | 3 | 6 | 8 | 5 | 11 | 11 | 12 | 2 | 2 | **1** | 2 | 4 | Ret | 13 | 11 | 120 |
| 6 | (Mexico) Sergio Pérez | 5 | 4 | Ret | 6 | 5 | 6 | 3 | 6 | 7 | 5 | 5 | DSQ | 9 | Ret | 5 | 3 | 6 | 5 | 112 |
| 7 | (Monaco) Stefano Coletti | 21† | 5 | 5 | Ret | 2 | 4 | 2 | 12 | 1 | 2 | 6 | DNS | 6 | 12 | Ret | Ret | | | 103 |
| 8 | (Austria) Martin Ragginger | 18† | Ret | 4 | 19† | | | 4 | 10 | 12 | 11 | 11 | 8 | 3 | 1 | Ret | Ret | 1 | 2 | 91 |
| 9 | (Germany) Dominik Wasem | 12 | 9 | 6 | 7 | 8 | 9 | 12 | 2 | **5** | 13 | 12 | 6 | 8 | 7 | 3 | 4 | 4 | 9 | 87 |
| 10 | (Austria) Philipp Eng | 7 | 7 | 3 | 4 | 7 | 7 | 10 | 14 | 8 | Ret | 10 | 9 | 4 | 5 | DSQ | DNS | 14 | 4 | 73 |
| 11 | (Germany) Maximilian Wissel | 19† | 13 | 9 | 8 | 19† | 16 | 11 | 18 | 2 | 8 | 20 | 5 | 10 | 8 | 8 | 9 | 10 | 7 | 45 |
| 12 | (Czech Republic) Josef Král | 8 | 11 | 11 | 13 | 9 | 20 | 13 | 4 | 10 | 9 | 9 | 10 | 11 | 11 | 9 | 5 | 5 | 10 | 40 |
| 13 | (Germany) Tobias Hegewald | 11 | 12 | 7 | 16 | 13 | 18 | 7 | 15 | 16 | 7 | 7 | 7 | 15 | 13 | 7 | 8 | 9 | 13 | 29 |
| 14 | (Germany) Jens Höing | 6 | Ret | 10 | 20† | 11 | 17 | 15 | 9 | 13 | 16 | 14 | 16 | 13 | 14 | 10 | 10 | 15 | 16 | 11 |
| 15 | (Switzerland) Devis Schwägli | 15 | 18 | 15 | 11 | 20† | 10 | 18 | 5 | | | | | | | | | | | 9 |
| 16 | (Germany) Christian Engelhart | | | | | | | | | | | | | 12 | 10 | 12 | 7 | 11 | 8 | 8 |
| 17 | (Germany) Patrick Kronenberger | 10 | 8 | 8 | 10 | 14 | 11 | 20† | 19 | Ret | 19† | | | | | | | | | 8 |
| 18 | (Spain) Daniel Campos-Hull | | | | | | | | | | | 15 | Ret | 14 | 16 | 15 | 11 | 7 | Ret | 4 |
| 19 | (Switzerland) Fabio Leimer | 13 | 17 | 14 | 15 | Ret | 15 | 8 | Ret | 14 | 10 | 17 | 12 | 17 | 15 | 11 | 15 | 16 | 14 | 4 |
| 20 | (Germany) Christian Zacherl | 14 | 14 | Ret | 14 | 15 | 12 | 16 | 8 | 15 | 14 | Ret | 11 | 16 | 17 | 14 | 12 | | | 3 |
| 21 | (Japan) Yoshitaka Kuroda | 17 | 15 | 12 | 9 | | | 17 | 17 | 17 | 15 | 16 | 13 | 19 | 18 | 13 | 16 | 12 | Ret | 2 |
| 22 | (United States) Jules Duc | | | | | | | | | 18 | 17 | | | | | | | | | 0 |
| 23 | (Romania) Andrei Harnagea | 20 | 19 | 16 | 18 | 18 | 21 | | | 19 | 18 | 19 | 17 | 21 | 20 | 17 | 17 | 18 | 15 | 0 |
| 24 | (Austria) Bernd Herndlhofer | | | | | | | | | | | 18 | 15 | 18 | 19 | 16 | 14 | 17 | 12 | 0 |
| 25 | (United Kingdom) Oliver Oakes | | | | | 12 | 14 | | | | | | | | | | | | | 0 |
| 26 | (Russia) Oskar Paegle | 16 | 16 | 17† | 17 | 16 | 19 | 19 | 16 | Ret | Ret | Ret | 14 | 20 | Ret | | | | | 0 |
| 27 | (Colombia) Sebastián Saavedra | | | | | | | | | | | 13 | DSQ | | | | | | | 0 |
| 28 | (Canada) Robert Wickens | | | | | 17 | 13 | | | | | | | | | | | | | 0 |
| Pos | Driver | HOC1 (Germany) | | LAU (Germany) | | NÜR1 (Germany) | | OSC1 (Germany) | | OSC2 (Germany) | | NOR (Germany) | | NÜR2 (Germany) | | ZAN (Netherlands) | | HOC2 (Germany) | | Pts |

| Colour | Result |
|---|---|
| Gold | Winner |
| Silver | Second place |
| Bronze | Third place |
| Green | Points classification |
| Blue | Non-points classification |
| Blue | Non-classified finish (NC) |
| Purple | Retired, not classified (Ret) |
| Red | Did not qualify (DNQ) |
| Red | Did not pre-qualify (DNPQ) |
| Black | Disqualified (DSQ) |
| White | Did not start (DNS) |
| White | Withdrew (WD) |
| White | Race cancelled (C) |
| Blank | Did not practice (DNP) |
| Blank | Did not arrive (DNA) |
| Blank | Excluded (EX) |

**Bold** – Pole
Italics – Fastest Lap
**R** – Rookie Cup

† — Drivers did not finish the race, but were classified as they completed over 90% of the race distance.
