= Josef Král =

Czech racing driver

- Nationality: (Czech Republic) Czech
- Born: 15 June 1990 (age 36) Dvůr Králové, Czech Republic

24H Series career
- Debut season: 2016
- Current team: Scuderia Praha
- Categorisation: FIA Silver
- Car number: 11
- Starts: 3
- Wins: 1
- Poles: 0
- Fastest laps: 0
- Best finish: 17th in 2016

Previous series
- 2016 2010–12 2009–11 2008–09 2007–08 2007 2006–07 2005: Blancpain GT Series Endurance Cup; GP2 Series; GP2 Asia Series; International Formula Master; A1 Grand Prix; Formula BMW UK; Formula BMW ADAC; Czech Formula 1400

Josef Král (born 15 June 1990 in Dvůr Králové nad Labem) is a professional racing driver from the Czech Republic and current Formula 1 commentator on Czech TV station Nova Sport 5.

== Career ==
=== Karting & early career ===
Král began his motorsport career in karting back in 1998, and during the following seven years he achieved notable success, winning the Czech Republic ICA Junior title in 2003 and the Czech ICA 100 Championship the following year, as well as numerous other titles.

In 2005, Král made his Formula Racing debut, finishing third in the Czech Formula 1400 series.

=== Formula BMW ===
In 2006, Král made the step up to Formula BMW, competing in the German ADAC series. Driving for Micánek Motorsport, he scored forty points during the year to be classified in twelfth place. At the end of the year, Král switched to Josef Kaufmann Racing to contest the Formula BMW World Final, held in Valencia. He originally finished as runner-up to team-mate Christian Vietoris, but was subsequently disqualified from the race.

Král continued in Formula BMW for 2007, this time switching to the UK series with Räikkönen Robertson Racing. He scored a total of thirteen podium places in eighteen races, including six wins, to finish as runner-up to Swede Marcus Ericsson. He also took part in two Formula BMW ADAC races, taking a single podium position.

Král once again took part in the end-of-season Formula BMW World Final in Valencia, this time driving for Mücke Motorsport. Again, he finished second on the road behind team-mate Philipp Eng, but was disqualified for a technical infringement.

=== A1 Grand Prix ===
In February 2008, Král made his debut for A1 Team Czech Republic in the South African round of the 2007–08 A1 Grand Prix season. After qualifying towards the back of the grid for both races, he finished eighteenth in the sprint race before retiring from the feature event.

=== International Formula Master ===
In 2008, Král joined Team JVA to contest the International Formula Master series. He finished the season in sixth place, taking three podium places, including a debut win at Oschersleben.

Král remained in the championship for 2009, this time switching to Italian team JD Motorsport. After taking podium places in Valencia, Brno and Brands Hatch, Král won his first race of the season at the Hungaroring, which acted as a support race for the 2009 Hungarian Grand Prix. He added another win at Oschersleben en route to third in the championship.

=== GP2 Series ===
In October 2009, Král made his debut in a GP2 car, testing for both Ocean Racing Technology and Piquet GP at Jerez in Spain. Later the same month, he signed with British team Super Nova Racing to contest the 2009–10 GP2 Asia Series. This relationship continued into the main series in 2010, when Král teamed up with his former Formula BMW rival Ericsson. During the sprint race at Valencia, Král's car was launched into the air after he collided with Rodolfo González, before landing heavily and hitting the tyre barriers. Král sustained two fractured vertebrae as a result, and was replaced by Luca Filippi until he recovered. After missing ten races, Král returned to action at the final round of the championship, where he scored his first series points.

Král moved to the Arden International team for 2011, partnered by 2010 FIA Formula Two Championship runner-up Jolyon Palmer. He finished tenth in the Asia series. In the main series, he scored his first podium in the Monaco sprint race. Another podium finish at Spa-Francorchamps saw him improve to 15th place in the championship. He moved to reigning teams' champion, Addax, for the 2012 season, alongside Johnny Cecotto, but was replaced by Dani Clos after the first round of the championship. He then returned to the seat for the fourth round of the series. After a run of pointless weekends, he took his first series victory in the sprint race at Spa-Francorchamps, only to be dropped for the following round of the championship in favour of Jake Rosenzweig. He finished 17th in the championship.

=== Formula One ===
Král tested a Formula One car for the first time at the 2010 season-ending "young drivers" test in Abu Dhabi, with Hispania Racing.

Král revealed in June 2013 that he had a contract in place to race in the 2013 Formula One season with HRT F1 before the team went into administration and eventually closed.

== Racing record ==
=== Career summary ===
Season	Series	Team	Races	Wins	Poles	F/Laps	Podiums	Points	Position
2005	Czech Formula 1400	?	?	?	?	?	?	?	**3rd**
2006	Formula BMW ADAC	Micánek Motorsport	18	0	0	0	0	40	12th
2007	Formula BMW UK	Räikkönen Robertson Racing	18	6	1	6	13	636	**2nd**
2007	Formula BMW ADAC	ADAC Berlin-Brandenburg	2	0	0	0	1	56	25th
2007–08	A1 Grand Prix	A1 Team Czech Republic	2	0	0	0	0	10	19th
2008	International Formula Master	Team JVA	16	1	0	0	3	29	6th
2009	International Formula Master	JD Motorsport	16	2	1	3	6	62	**3rd**
2009–10	GP2 Asia Series	Super Nova Racing	8	0	0	0	1	8	11th
2010	GP2 Series	Super Nova Racing	10	0	0	0	0	3	24th
2010	Formula One	HRT F1 Team	Test driver						
2011	GP2 Series	Arden International	18	0	0	0	2	15	15th
2011	GP2 Asia Series	Arden International	4	0	0	0	1	8	10th
2011	GP2 Final	Arden International	2	0	0	0	0	0	16th
2012	GP2 Series	Barwa Addax Team	16	1	0	0	1	27	17th
2013	Auto GP	Zele Racing	2	0	0	0	0	0	23rd
2016	Blancpain GT Series Endurance Cup	Scuderia Praha	1	0	0	0	0	0	NC
2016	Blancpain GT Series Endurance Cup - Pro-Am	Scuderia Praha	1	0	0	0	0	13	30th
2016	24H Series - A6	Scuderia Praha							
2017	24H Series - A6	Scuderia Praha							
2018	24H GT Series - A6	Bohemia Energy Racing with Scuderia Praha							
2019	Blancpain GT Series Endurance Cup	Bohemia Energy Racing with Scuderia Praha	1	0	0	0	0	0	NC
2019	Blancpain GT Series Endurance Cup - Pro-Am	Bohemia Energy Racing with Scuderia Praha	1	0	0	0	0	7	23rd
2019	24H GT Series - A6	Bohemia Energy Racing with Scuderia Praha							
2021	24H GT Series - GT3	MiddleCap racing with Scuderia Praha							
2022	Ferrari Challenge Europe - Trofeo Pirelli	Scuderia Praha	2	0	0	0	1	19	8th
2023	Ferrari Challenge Finali Mondiali - Trofeo Pirelli (Pro)	Scuderia Praha	2	0	0	0	1	15	9th
2025	Middle East Trophy - GT3 Pro-Am	Scuderia Praha	2	0	0	0	0	21	8th
2025	24H Series - GT3	Scuderia Praha	5	0	0	0	1	98	6th
2025–26	24H Series Middle East - GT3 Pro-Am	Scuderia Praha	2	0	0	0	0	0	NC
2026	Italian GT Championship Sprint Cup - GT Cup	Scuderia Praha							

=== Complete Formula BMW ADAC results ===
(key) (Races in bold indicate pole position; races in italics indicate fastest lap)

Year	Entrant	1	2	3	4	5	6	7	8	9	10	11	12	13	14	15	16	17	18	DC	Points
2006	Micánek Motorsport	HOC; 1; 8	HOC; 2; 11	LAU; 1; 11	LAU; 2; 13	NÜR; 1; 9	NÜR; 2; 20	OSC; 1; 13	OSC; 2; 4	OSC; 1; 10	OSC; 2; 9	NOR; 1; 9	NOR; 2; 10	NÜR; 1; 11	NÜR; 2; 11	ZAN; 1; 9	ZAN; 2; 5	HOC; 1; 5	HOC; 2; 10	12th	40
2007	ADAC Berlin-Brandenburg	OSC1; 1	OSC1; 2	LAU; 1	LAU; 2	NOR; 1	NOR; 2	NÜR1; 1	NÜR1; 2	ZAN; 1	ZAN; 2	OSC2; 1	OSC2; 2	NÜR2; 1	NÜR2; 2	CAT; 1	CAT; 2	HOC; 1; 13	HOC; 2; 2	25th	56

=== Complete Formula BMW UK results ===
(key) (Races in bold indicate pole position) (Races in italics indicate fastest lap)

Year	Team	1	2	3	4	5	6	7	8	9	10	11	12	13	14	15	16	17	18	DC	Pts
2007	Räikkönen Robertson Racing	BRH; 1 Ret	BRH; 2; 18	ROC; 1; 1	**ROC**; **2**; 1	THR; 1; 3	THR; 2; 1	CRO; 1; 3	CRO; 2; 1	OUL; 1; 1	OUL; 2; 2	DON; 1; 5	DON; 2; 2	SNE; 1; 2	SNE; 2; 1	BRH; 1; 10	BRH; 2; 2	KNO; 1; 4	KNO; 2; 3	2nd	636

=== Complete A1 Grand Prix results ===
(key) (Races in bold indicate pole position) (Races in italics indicate fastest lap)

Year	Entrant	1	2	3	4	5	6	7	8	9	10	11	12	13	14	15	16	17	18	19	20	DC	Points
2007–08	Czech Republic	NED; SPR	NED; FEA	CZE; SPR	CZE; FEA	MYS; SPR	MYS; FEA	ZHU; SPR	ZHU; FEA	NZL; SPR	NZL; FEA	AUS; SPR	AUS; FEA	RSA; SPR; 18	RSA; FEA; Ret	MEX; SPR	MEX; FEA	SHA; SPR	SHA; FEA	GBR; SPR	GBR; SPR	19th	10

=== Complete International Formula Master results ===
(key) (Races in bold indicate pole position) (Races in italics indicate fastest lap)

Year	Entrant	1	2	3	4	5	6	7	8	9	10	11	12	13	14	15	16	DC	Points
2008	Team JVA	VAL; 1; 17	VAL; 2; 9	PAU; 1; 16	PAU; 2; 10	BRN; 1; 12	BRN; 2; 12	EST; 1; 13	EST; 2; 14	BRH; 1 Ret	BRH; 2 Ret	OSC; 1; 7	OSC; 2; 1	IMO; 1; 8	IMO; 2; 2	MNZ; 1; 7	MNZ; 2; 3	6th	29
2009	JD Motorsport	PAU; 1 Ret	PAU; 2; 13	VAL; 1; 2	VAL; 2; 4	BRN; 1; 3	BRN; 2 DSQ	BRH; 1; 2	BRH; 2; 5	**HUN**; **1**; 1	HUN; 2 Ret	SPA; 1; 7	SPA; 2 Ret	OSC; 1; 6	OSC; 2; 1	IMO; 1; 4	IMO; 2; 2	3rd	62

=== Complete GP2 Series results ===
(key) (Races in bold indicate pole position) (Races in italics indicate fastest lap)

Year	Entrant	1	2	3	4	5	6	7	8	9	10	11	12	13	14	15	16	17	18	19	20	21	22	23	24	DC	Points
2010	Super Nova Racing	CAT; FEA; 12	CAT; SPR; 19	MON; FEA; 13	MON; SPR; 8	IST; FEA; 15	IST; SPR; 14	VAL; FEA; Ret	VAL; SPR; Ret	SIL; FEA	SIL; SPR	HOC; FEA	HOC; SPR	HUN; FEA	HUN; SPR	SPA; FEA	SPA; SPR	MNZ; FEA	MNZ; SPR	YMC; FEA; 8	YMC; SPR; 5					24th	3
2011	Arden International	IST; FEA; 13	IST; SPR; 6	CAT; FEA; 9	CAT; SPR; 21	MON; FEA; 6	MON; SPR; 2	VAL; FEA; 8	VAL; SPR; Ret	SIL; FEA; 23	SIL; SPR; 20	NÜR; FEA; 18	NÜR; SPR; 11	HUN; FEA; 9	HUN; SPR; 17	SPA; FEA; 8	SPA; SPR; 3	MNZ; FEA; Ret	MNZ; SPR; 17							15th	15
2012	Barwa Addax Team	SEP; FEA; 14	SEP; SPR; 9	BHR1; FEA	BHR1; SPR	BHR2; FEA	BHR2; SPR	CAT; FEA; 20	CAT; SPR; 16	MON; FEA; Ret	MON; SPR; 10	VAL; FEA; DSQ	VAL; SPR; 11	SIL; FEA; 16	SIL; SPR; 10	HOC; FEA; 12	HOC; SPR; 13	HUN; FEA; 24	HUN; SPR; 17	SPA; FEA; 4	SPA; SPR; 1	MNZ; FEA	MNZ; SPR	MRN; FEA	MRN; SPR	17th	27

==== Complete GP2 Asia Series results ====
(key) (Races in bold indicate pole position) (Races in italics indicate fastest lap)

Year	Entrant	1	2	3	4	5	6	7	8	DC	Points
2009–10	Super Nova Racing	YMC1; FEA; 5	YMC1; SPR; 3	YMC2; FEA; 9	YMC2; SPR; Ret	BHR1; FEA; 21	BHR1; SPR; 11	BHR2; FEA; 16	BHR2; SPR; 10	11th	8
2011	Arden International	YMC; FEA; 6	YMC; SPR; 2	IMO; FEA; 13	IMO; SPR; 9					10th	8

==== Complete GP2 Final results ====
(key) (Races in bold indicate pole position) (Races in italics indicate fastest lap)

Year	Entrant	1	2	DC	Points
2011	Arden International	YMC; FEA; 20	YMC; SPR; 12	16th	0
