= 2007 Formula BMW ADAC season =

2007 Formula BMW ADAC

Seasons
- ← 2006 none →

The 2007 Formula BMW ADAC season was a multi-event motor racing championship for open wheel, formula racing cars held across Europe. The championship featured drivers competing in 1.2 litre Formula BMW single seat race cars. The 2007 season was the tenth and the last Formula BMW ADAC season organized by BMW Motorsport and ADAC before it was merged with Formula BMW UK series into Formula BMW Europe in 2008. The season began at Motorsport Arena Oschersleben on 5 May and finished at the Hockenheimring on 14 October, after eighteen races.

Jens Klingmann was crowned series champion.

== Driver lineup ==
Team	No.	Driver	Class	Rounds
(Germany) ADAC Berlin-Brandenburg	2	(Germany) Markus Pommer	R	All
(Germany) ADAC Berlin-Brandenburg	4	(Germany) Kevin Mirocha	R	All
(Germany) ADAC Berlin-Brandenburg	5	(Austria) Philipp Eng		All
(Germany) ADAC Berlin-Brandenburg	6	(Austria) Maxim Wagner	R	1–3
(Germany) ADAC Berlin-Brandenburg	13	(Brazil) Pedro Bianchini	R	3–9
(Germany) ADAC Berlin-Brandenburg	31	(United Kingdom) Henry Surtees	R	4
(Germany) ADAC Berlin-Brandenburg	35	(Czech Republic) Josef Král		9
(Germany) G&J Motorsport	7	(Germany) Johannes Seidlitz	R	All
(Germany) Josef Kaufmann Racing	8	(Germany) Marco Wittmann	R	All
(Germany) Josef Kaufmann Racing	9	(Netherlands) Mathijs Harkema		All
(Germany) Josef Kaufmann Racing	27	(France) Adrien Tambay	R	All
(Germany) Eifelland Racing	10	(Spain) Daniel Campos-Hull		All
(Germany) Eifelland Racing	11	(Germany) Jens Klingmann		All
(Germany) Eifelland Racing	12	(Brazil) Tiago Geronimi	R	All
(Germany) Eifelland Racing	30	(Netherlands) Thomas Hylkema	R	3–9
(Germany) AM-Holzer Rennsport GmbH	14	(Republic of Ireland) Niall Quinn		All
(Germany) AM-Holzer Rennsport GmbH	15	(Romania) Andrei Harnagea		4–5
(Germany) AM-Holzer Rennsport GmbH	33	(Spain) Daniel Juncadella		6–8
(Germany) AM-Holzer Rennsport GmbH	39	(Colombia) Sebastián Saavedra		9
(Germany) AM-Holzer Rennsport GmbH	40	(Thailand) James Grunwell		9
(Germany) GU-Racing Team International	18	(Germany) Maximilian Wissel		All
(Germany) GU-Racing Team International	19	(Colombia) Carlos Gaitán		All
(Germany) GU-Racing Team International	20	(Bulgaria) Nikolay Varbitzaliev	R	All
(Germany) GU-Racing Team International	21	(Latvia) Otto Birznieks		7
(Germany) GU-Racing Team International	22	(Germany) Jens Höing		All
(Germany) GU-Racing Team International	34	(Germany) Maximilian Mayer		9
(Netherlands) Luuk Glansdorp	24	(Netherlands) Luuk Glansdorp	R	1–3
(Germany) Zettl Motorsport	24	(Netherlands) Luuk Glansdorp	R	4–9
(Germany) Zettl Motorsport	29	(Germany) Michael Zettl	R	All
(Germany) Team Zinner	25	(Germany) Marlene Dietrich		All
(Germany) Team Zinner	26	(Luxembourg) Samuel Curridor	R	All
(Germany) Team Zinner	38	(United Kingdom) Tom Gladdis	R	All
(Germany) IBEX Motorsport	28	(Germany) Timo Walter	R	All
(Austria) Bernd Herndlhofer	36	(Austria) Bernd Herndlhofer		9
(United Kingdom) Daniel McKenzie	37	(United Kingdom) Daniel McKenzie		9
(Mexico) Esteban Gutiérrez	41	(Mexico) Esteban Gutiérrez		9

Icon	Class
R	Rookie Cup

== 2007 Schedule ==
Round		Location	Circuit	Date	Supporting
1	R1	Oschersleben, Germany	Motorsport Arena Oschersleben	5 May	Deutsche Tourenwagen Masters
1	R2	Oschersleben, Germany	Motorsport Arena Oschersleben	6 May	Deutsche Tourenwagen Masters
2	R1	Klettwitz, Germany	EuroSpeedway Lausitz	19 May	Deutsche Tourenwagen Masters
2	R2	Klettwitz, Germany	EuroSpeedway Lausitz	20 May	Deutsche Tourenwagen Masters
3	R1	Nuremberg, Germany	Norisring	23 June	Deutsche Tourenwagen Masters
3	R2	Nuremberg, Germany	Norisring	24 June	Deutsche Tourenwagen Masters
4	R1	Nürburg, Germany	Nürburgring	21 July	European Grand Prix
4	R2	Nürburg, Germany	Nürburgring	22 July	European Grand Prix
5	R1	Zandvoort, Netherlands	Circuit Park Zandvoort	28 July	Deutsche Tourenwagen Masters
5	R2	Zandvoort, Netherlands	Circuit Park Zandvoort	29 July	Deutsche Tourenwagen Masters
6	R1	Oschersleben, Germany	Motorsport Arena Oschersleben	25 August	World Touring Car Championship
6	R2	Oschersleben, Germany	Motorsport Arena Oschersleben	26 August	World Touring Car Championship
7	R1	Nürburg, Germany	Nürburgring	1 September	Deutsche Tourenwagen Masters
7	R2	Nürburg, Germany	Nürburgring	2 September	Deutsche Tourenwagen Masters
8	R1	Catalunya, Spain	Circuit de Catalunya	22 September	Deutsche Tourenwagen Masters
8	R2	Catalunya, Spain	Circuit de Catalunya	23 September	Deutsche Tourenwagen Masters
9	R1	Hockenheim, Germany	Hockenheimring	13 October	Deutsche Tourenwagen Masters
9	R2	Hockenheim, Germany	Hockenheimring	14 October	Deutsche Tourenwagen Masters

== Results ==
Round		Circuit	Pole position	Fastest lap	Winning driver	Winning team
1	R1	(Germany) Motorsport Arena Oschersleben	(Germany) Marco Wittmann	(Germany) Marco Wittmann	(Austria) Philipp Eng	(Germany) ADAC Berlin-Brandenburg
1	R2	(Germany) Motorsport Arena Oschersleben	(Germany) Marco Wittmann	(Germany) Marco Wittmann	(Germany) Jens Klingmann	(Germany) Eifelland Racing
2	R1	(Germany) EuroSpeedway Lausitz	(Germany) Jens Klingmann	(Germany) Jens Klingmann	(Germany) Jens Klingmann	(Germany) Eifelland Racing
2	R2	(Germany) EuroSpeedway Lausitz	(Germany) Jens Klingmann	(Germany) Jens Klingmann	(Germany) Jens Klingmann	(Germany) Eifelland Racing
3	R1	(Germany) Norisring	(Germany) Jens Klingmann	(Spain) Daniel Campos-Hull	(Germany) Jens Klingmann	(Germany) Eifelland Racing
3	R2	(Germany) Norisring	(Germany) Jens Klingmann	(Germany) Jens Klingmann	(Germany) Jens Klingmann	(Germany) Eifelland Racing
4	R1	(Germany) Nürburgring	(Spain) Daniel Campos-Hull	(Germany) Jens Klingmann	(Spain) Daniel Campos-Hull	(Germany) Eifelland Racing
4	R2	(Germany) Nürburgring	(France) Adrien Tambay	(Spain) Daniel Campos-Hull	(Spain) Daniel Campos-Hull	(Germany) Eifelland Racing
5	R1	(Netherlands) Circuit Park Zandvoort	(Spain) Daniel Campos-Hull	(Spain) Daniel Campos-Hull	(Germany) Jens Klingmann	(Germany) Eifelland Racing
5	R2	(Netherlands) Circuit Park Zandvoort	(Spain) Daniel Campos-Hull	(Germany) Maximilian Wissel	(Germany) Maximilian Wissel	(Germany) GU-Racing International
6	R1	(Germany) Motorsport Arena Oschersleben	(Germany) Jens Klingmann	(Germany) Jens Klingmann	(Germany) Jens Klingmann	(Germany) Eifelland Racing
6	R2	(Germany) Motorsport Arena Oschersleben	(Germany) Marco Wittmann	(Austria) Philipp Eng	(Germany) Marco Wittmann	(Germany) Josef Kaufmann Racing
7	R1	(Germany) Nürburgring	(Austria) Philipp Eng	(Germany) Jens Klingmann	(Germany) Jens Klingmann	(Germany) Eifelland Racing
7	R2	(Germany) Nürburgring	(Germany) Marco Wittmann	(Austria) Philipp Eng	(Germany) Marco Wittmann	(Germany) Josef Kaufmann Racing
8	R1	(Spain) Circuit de Catalunya	(Germany) Jens Klingmann	(Germany) Jens Klingmann	(Germany) Jens Klingmann	(Germany) Eifelland Racing
8	R2	(Spain) Circuit de Catalunya	(Germany) Jens Klingmann	(Austria) Philipp Eng	(Austria) Philipp Eng	(Germany) ADAC Berlin-Brandengurg
9	R1	(Germany) Hockenheimring	(France) Adrien Tambay	(Mexico) Esteban Gutiérrez	(France) Adrien Tambay	(Germany) Josef Kaufmann Racing
9	R2	(Germany) Hockenheimring	(Austria) Philipp Eng	(Germany) Jens Klingmann	(France) Adrien Tambay	(Germany) Josef Kaufmann Racing

== Championship standings ==
=== Drivers' standings ===
- Points are awarded as follows:

1	2	3	4	5	6	7	8	9	10	11	12	13	14	15	16	17	18	19	20	PP
45	40	37	34	32	30	28	26	24	22	20	18	16	14	12	10	8	6	4	2	**1**

Pos	Driver	OSC1 (Germany)		LAU (Germany)		NOR (Germany)		NÜR1 (Germany)		ZAN (Netherlands)		OSC2 (Germany)		NÜR2 (Germany)		CAT (Spain)		HOC (Germany)		Pts
1	(Germany) Jens Klingmann	10	1	**1**	**1**	**1**	**1**	2	2	1	Ret	**1**	2	1	4	**1**	**4**	2	3	699
2	(Spain) Daniel Campos-Hull	4	6	2	2	2	2	**1**	1	**2**	**3**	3	6	3	2	2	8	12	Ret	622
3	(Austria) Philipp Eng	1	3	4	5	6	7	9	4	3	4	2	3	**5**	3	3	1	DSQ	**6**	595
4	(France) Adrien Tambay	9	Ret	5	9	5	3	4	**3**	5	2	5	4	2	5	14	3	**1**	1	573
5	(Germany) Marco Wittmann	**3**	**2**	3	4	4	4	5	5	8	5	4	**1**	6	**1**	21†	2	4	DSQ	570
6	(Germany) Maximilian Wissel	16	5	7	19†	19	8	3	6	4	1	6	8	4	Ret	Ret	6	6	8	426
7	(Republic of Ireland) Niall Quinn	2	7	6	6	3	5	8	16	6	11	15	19†	7	6	4	10	23	20†	415
8	(Germany) Kevin Mirocha	12	4	18†	3	Ret	6	13	12	7	7	7	7	10	13	7	11	Ret	5	389
9	(Netherlands) Mathijs Harkema	5	11	8	7	8	11	21	8	9	10	Ret	5	Ret	7	8	12	11	7	376
10	(Germany) Markus Pommer	Ret	14†	10	12	10	12	6	15	10	Ret	12	11	11	10	9	7	7	12	336
11	(Brazil) Tiago Geronimi	8	Ret	9	8	7	Ret	7	10	Ret	6	Ret	10	14	8	5	5	22	15	322
12	(Netherlands) Luuk Glansdorp	15	Ret	Ret	10	12	21†	10	11	Ret	14	8	9	9	9	10	14	9	9	290
13	(Germany) Johannes Seidlitz	11	Ret	13	15	9	13	14	17	Ret	9	10	12	13	11	6	Ret	Ret	10	262
14	(Germany) Jens Höing	DSQ	16	12	13	13	9	22	7	11	21	13	Ret	23†	15	12	Ret	10	13	216
15	(Luxembourg) Samuel Curridor	7	Ret	11	11	18†	20†	23	14	Ret	12	14	20†	15	12	13	15	26	Ret	182
16	(Brazil) Pedro Bianchini					Ret	14	11	13	Ret	8	11	21	8	Ret	Ret	17	5	Ret	162
17	(Colombia) Carlos Gaitán	14	9	Ret	14	Ret	15	20	20	12	16	16	14	19	17	15	Ret	16	19	158
18	(Bulgaria) Nikolay Varbitzaliev	13	15	14	17	16	19	12	19	14	19	19†	13	16	14	18	19	27	23†	158
19	(Germany) Timo Walter	18	12	16	16	DSQ	16	18	18	15	15	17	15	18	16	16	16	17	24†	154
20	(Netherlands) Thomas Hylkema					14	10	15	21	Ret	13	Ret	16	17	Ret	17	13	14	17	128
21	(Germany) Marlene Dietrich	17	10	15	18	15	18	16	22	16	18	18	18	21	19	19	18	19	22†	122
22	(Germany) Michael Zettl	19†	13	17	20	17	17	19	Ret	13	17	Ret	17	20	18	20	Ret	18	14	112
23	(Spain) Daniel Juncadella											9	Ret	12	21†	11	9			86
24	(Austria) Maxim Wagner	6	8	Ret	Ret	11	Ret													76
25	(Czech Republic) Josef Král																	13	2	56
26	(Mexico) Esteban Gutiérrez																	15	4	46
27	(Colombia) Sebastián Saavedra																	3	21†	37
28	(Thailand) James Grunwell																	8	16	36
29	(United Kingdom) Henry Surtees							24	9											24
30	(United Kingdom) Daniel McKenzie																	21	11	20
31	(Romania) Andrei Harnagea							17	23	17	20									18
32	(United Kingdom) Tom Gladdis																	20	18	8
33	(Latvia) Otto Birznieks													22	20					2
34	(Germany) Maximilian Mayer																	24	Ret	0
35	(Austria) Bernd Herndlhofer																	25	DSQ	0
Pos	Driver	OSC1 (Germany)		LAU (Germany)		NOR (Germany)		NÜR1 (Germany)		ZAN (Netherlands)		OSC2 (Germany)		NÜR2 (Germany)		CAT (Spain)		HOC (Germany)		Pts

Colour	Result
Gold	Winner
Silver	Second place
Bronze	Third place
Green	Points classification
Blue	Non-points classification
Blue	Non-classified finish (NC)
Purple	Retired, not classified (Ret)
Red	Did not qualify (DNQ)
Red	Did not pre-qualify (DNPQ)
Black	Disqualified (DSQ)
White	Did not start (DNS)
White	Withdrew (WD)
White	Race cancelled (C)
Blank	Did not practice (DNP)
Blank	Did not arrive (DNA)
Blank	Excluded (EX)

**Bold** – Pole
Italics – Fastest Lap
**R** – Rookie Cup

† — Drivers did not finish the race, but were classified as they completed over 90% of the race distance.

=== Teams' standings ===
	Team	Points
1	(Germany) Eifelland Racing	1363
2	(Germany) Josef Kaufmann Racing	1223
3	(Germany) ADAC Berlin-Brandenburg	1140
4	(Germany) GU-Racing Team International	758
5	(Germany) AM-Holzer Rennsport GmbH	592
6	(Germany) Zettl Motorsport	350
7	(Germany) Team Zinner	332
8	(Germany) G&J Motorsport	262
9	(Germany) IBEX Motorsport	154
10	(Netherlands) Luuk Glansdorp	52
11	(Mexico) Esteban Gutiérrez	46
12	(United Kingdom) Daniel McKenzie	20
