= Daniel Campos-Hull =

Spanish racing driver (born 1989)

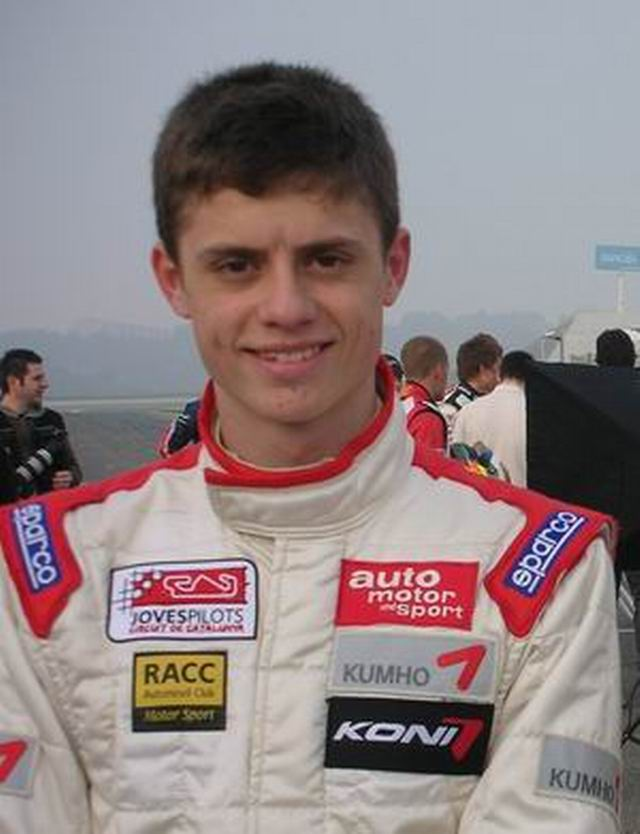
- Nationality: (Spain) Spanish
- Born: 3 August 1989 (age 37) Barcelona (Spain)
- Relatives: Oliver Campos-Hull (brother)
- Categorisation: FIA Gold

Previous series
- 2008 2006-07 2006 2006: Formula 3 Euro Series; Formula BMW ADAC; Eurocup Formula Renault 2.0; Italian Formula Renault Championship

Daniel Campos-Hull (born 3 August 1989 in Barcelona) is a Spanish race car driver. His father is Spanish and his mother English.

== Career ==
Campos-Hull began his career in open wheel motor racing in 2006, racing mostly in the German Formula BMW and Italian Formula Renault championships coming 18th and 23rd respectively. He also had two starts in the Formula Renault Eurocup at the second meeting of the season at the Istanbul Park in Turkey.

For 2007, Campos-Hull entered his second season of German Formula BMW. Heimpressed, taking four podiums in the first six races before winning both races at the fourth meeting at the Nürburgring. Campos-Hull finished second in that year's championship to Jens Klingmann.

Campos-Hull moved up a class for 2008 after being hired by HBR Motorsport to drive one of their Formula Three cars in the Formula Three Euroseries alongside Lebanese driver Basil Shaaban. He failed to score a point in his rookie season.

In 2009, Campos-Hull moved to Italian Formula 3 and drove for Prema Powerteam (Dallara-FPT). He finished fifth overall with 148 points after an amazing season in which he challenged the leader Zampieri until the last week-end of race. Campos-Hull started second at the last event in Monza, but an accident caused by his team-mate Castellacci at the first corner forced him to retire after a few hundred meters. He then started last in the following days race but he was able to recover up to third. This effort was anyway not enough to end the championship among top-three.

== Motor racing results ==
=== Complete Eurocup Formula Renault 2.0 results ===
(key) (Races in bold indicate pole position; races in italics indicate fastest lap)

Year	Entrant	1	2	3	4	5	6	7	8	9	10	11	12	13	14	DC	Points
2006	Twincam Motorsport	ZOL; 1	ZOL; 2	IST; 1; 11	IST; 2; 10	MIS; 1	MIS; 2	NÜR; 1	NÜR; 2	DON; 1	DON; 2	LMS; 1	LMS; 2	CAT; 1	CAT; 2	NC†	0

† As Campos-Hull was a guest driver, he was ineligible for points

=== Formula 3 Euro Series ===
(key)

Season	Team	1	2	3	4	5	6	7	8	9	10	11	12	13	14	15	16	17	18	19	20	Pos.	Points
2008	HBR Motorsport	HOC; 14	HOC; 14	MUG; 27	MUG; 21	PAU; Ret	PAU; 19	NOR; 17	NOR; 11	ZAN; 22	ZAN; 14	NÜR; 20	NÜR; 8	BRH; 13	BRH; 13	CAT; Ret	CAT; 17	BUG; 10	BUG; 7	HOC; 14	HOC; Ret	25th	0
