= 2007 Formula BMW USA season =

Seasons
- ← 2006 2008 →

The 2007 Formula BMW USA season was the fourth season of the American Formula BMW championship for young drivers making the transition to car racing. The Overall Championship was won by Daniel Morad as Esteban Gutiérrez was the highest classified rookie.

== Teams and drivers ==
All cars were Mygale FB02 chassis powered by BMW engines.

Team	No	Driver	Class	Rounds
(United States) EuroInternational	4	(Canada) Yannick Hofman		All
(United States) EuroInternational	5	(Colombia) Sebastián Saavedra		1–4
(United States) EuroInternational	50	(France) Adrien Tambay	R	3, 6
(United States) EuroInternational	70	(Canada) Daniel Morad		All
(United States) Gelles Racing	6	(United States) Matt Ferris		1
(United States) Gelles Racing	8	(United States) Robert Thorne		1
(United States) Gelles Racing	9	(United States) Keenan Schmitke	R	1
(United States) Gelles Racing	11	(Canada) Maxime Pelletier		1
(United States) Hearn Motorsports	6	(United States) Matt Ferris		4
(United States) Hearn Motorsports	12	(United States) Eric Morrow	R	All
(United States) Hearn Motorsports	16	(United States) Alexander Rossi		1–3
(United States) Hearn Motorsports		(United States) Bill Goshen		5
(United States) Hearn Motorsports		(United States) Jordan Lynch		6
(Canada) Team Autotecnica	7	(Mexico) Esteban Gutiérrez	R	All
(Canada) Team Autotecnica	14	(Canada) Philip Major		All
(United States) Team Apex Racing USA	8	(United States) Robert Thorne		2–7
(United States) Team Apex Racing USA	16	(United States) Alexander Rossi		4–7
(United States) Team Apex Racing USA	27	(United States) Lindsey Adams		1–3
(United States) Team Apex Racing USA	66	(Brazil) Felipe Polehtto		1
(United States) HBR Motorsport USA	11	(Canada) Maxime Pelletier		2–7
(United States) HBR Motorsport USA	34	(Brazil) Ricardo Favoretto	R	All
(United States) HBR Motorsport USA	90	(Colombia) Steven Guerrero		All
(United States) Team KMA Racing	13	(Canada) Jeffrey Petriello	R	1–5
(United States) Team KMA Racing	31	(United States) Timothy Hollowell	R	2–7
(United States) Team KMA Racing	53	(United States) Mike Hill		All
(United States) Team KMA Racing	55	(United States) Julia Landauer		All
(United States) JD Racing	19	(United States) Jordan Dick		All
(United States) TADD Motorsports	31	(United States) Timothy Hollowell	R	1
(Canada) Jensen MotorSport		(Canada) Michael Vincec	R	2

Icon	Class
R	Rookie Cup

== Races ==
Round		Circuit	Date	Pole position	Fastest lap	Winning driver	Winning team	Winning rookie
1	R1	(United States) Miller Motorsport Park	18 May	(Mexico) Esteban Gutiérrez	(Canada) Daniel Morad	(Canada) Daniel Morad	(United States) EuroInternational	(Canada) Jeffrey Petriello
1	R2	(United States) Miller Motorsport Park	19 May	(Mexico) Esteban Gutiérrez	(United States) Alexander Rossi	(Mexico) Esteban Gutiérrez	(Canada) Team Autotecnica	(Mexico) Esteban Gutiérrez
2	R1	(Canada) Circuit Gilles Villeneuve	9 June	(Mexico) Esteban Gutiérrez	(Canada) Daniel Morad	(Canada) Daniel Morad	(United States) EuroInternational	(Mexico) Esteban Gutiérrez
2	R2	(Canada) Circuit Gilles Villeneuve	10 June	(Mexico) Esteban Gutiérrez	(Mexico) Esteban Gutiérrez	(Canada) Daniel Morad	(United States) EuroInternational	(Mexico) Esteban Gutiérrez
3	R1	(United States) Indianapolis Motor Speedway	16 June	(Mexico) Esteban Gutiérrez	(Colombia) Sebastián Saavedra	(Canada) Daniel Morad	(United States) EuroInternational	(Mexico) Esteban Gutiérrez
3	R2	(United States) Indianapolis Motor Speedway	17 June	(Mexico) Esteban Gutiérrez	(Colombia) Sebastián Saavedra	(Mexico) Esteban Gutiérrez	(Canada) Team Autotecnica	(Mexico) Esteban Gutiérrez
4	R1	(United States) Lime Rock Park	7 July	(Canada) Daniel Morad	(Canada) Daniel Morad	(Colombia) Sebastián Saavedra	(United States) EuroInternational	(Canada) Jeffrey Petriello
4	R2	(United States) Lime Rock Park	7 July	(Canada) Daniel Morad	(Canada) Daniel Morad	(Canada) Daniel Morad	(United States) EuroInternational	(United States) Eric Morrow
5	R1	(United States) San Jose	28 July	(United States) Alexander Rossi	(Canada) Maxime Pelletier	(United States) Alexander Rossi	(United States) Team Apex Racing USA	(United States) Eric Morrow
5	R2	(United States) San Jose	29 July	(Mexico) Esteban Gutiérrez	(Canada) Daniel Morad	(Mexico) Esteban Gutiérrez	(Canada) Team Autotecnica	(Mexico) Esteban Gutiérrez
6	R1	(United States) Road America	11 August	(Canada) Philip Major	(Mexico) Esteban Gutiérrez	(United States) Alexander Rossi	(United States) Team Apex Racing USA	(Mexico) Esteban Gutiérrez
6	R2	(United States) Road America	12 August	(Mexico) Esteban Gutiérrez	(France) Adrien Tambay	(Mexico) Esteban Gutiérrez	(Canada) Team Autotecnica	(Mexico) Esteban Gutiérrez
7	R1	(Canada) Mosport	25 August	(Mexico) Esteban Gutiérrez	(United States) Alexander Rossi	(United States) Alexander Rossi	(United States) Team Apex Racing USA	(United States) Timothy Hollowell
7	R2	(Canada) Mosport	26 August	(Canada) Daniel Morad	(Canada) Daniel Morad	(Canada) Daniel Morad	(United States) EuroInternational	(Mexico) Esteban Gutiérrez

== Standings ==
Points were awarded as follows:

Position	**1st**	**2nd**	**3rd**	**4th**	**5th**	**6th**	**7th**	**8th**	**9th**	**10th**	**11th**	**12th**	**13th**	**14th**	**15th**	**16th**	**17th**	**18th**	**19th**	**20th**	**PP**
Points	45	40	37	34	32	30	28	26	24	22	20	18	16	14	12	10	8	6	4	2	1

=== Drivers' Championship ===
Pos	Driver	MMP (United States)		CGV (Canada)		IMS (United States)		LIM (United States)		SJO (United States)		ROA (United States)		MOS (Canada)		Pts
1	(Canada) Daniel Morad	1	2	1	1	1	2	**7**	**1**	11†	2	15†	3	4	**1**	524
2	(Mexico) Esteban Gutiérrez	**4**	**1**	**2**	**6**	**3**	**1**	Ret	17	DSQ	**1**	2	**1**	**12**	2	436
3	(United States) Alexander Rossi	3	4	13†	10	4	6	16	3	**1**	Ret	1	9	1	6	410
4	(Canada) Maxime Pelletier	17	9	14†	7	2	3	2	5	2	4	16†	14	9	3	382
5	(Colombia) Steven Guerrero	8	3	Ret	9	6	9	3	6	10†	6	5	7	8	5	378
6	(United States) Robert Thorne	7	7	5	5	Ret	16†	9	4	3	13	7	5	2	8	367
7	(Canada) Yannick Hofman	11	11	6	4	10	10	12	7	5	12	9	6	3	7	363
8	(Brazil) Ricardo Favoretto	5	5	DNS	11	16	4	10	12	4	3	4	x16†	7	4	345
9	(United States) Jordan Dick	10	8	7	12	7	7	5	8	12†	8	11	13	11	9	332
10	(Canada) Philip Major	12	18	4	3	Ret	17	8	11	Ret	5	**6**	4	6	10	298
11	(United States) Eric Morrow	18	12	8	Ret	12	13	13	10	6	7	8	10	14†	11	262
12	(Colombia) Sebastián Saavedra	6	16	3	2	9	5	1	2							258
13	(Canada) Jeffrey Petriello	2	6	11	8	8	8	4	15	7	DNS					242
14	(United States) Timothy Hollowell	14	14	10	13	13	15†	14	14	13†	9	10	12	10	12	242
15	(United States) Mike Hill	16	17†	9	16	11	11	11	13	Ret	14†	12	11	13	14†	210
16	(United States) Julia Landauer	20†	Ret	Ret	14	14	12	15	16	9	11	14	8	5	13	202
17	(France) Adrien Tambay					5	Ret					3	2			109
18	(United States) Lindsey Adams	13	13	12	17	15	14									84
19	(United States) Matt Ferris	19†	10					6	9							80
20	(United States) Bill Goshen									8	10					48
21	(Brazil) Felipe Polehtto	9	19													28
22	(United States) Jordan Lynch											13	15			28
23	(United States) Keenan Schmitke	15	15													24
24	(Canada) Michael Vincec			Ret	15											12
Pos	Driver	MMP (United States)		CGV (Canada)		IMS (United States)		LIM (United States)		SJO (United States)		ROA (United States)		MOS (Canada)		Pts

Colour	Result
Gold	Winner
Silver	Second place
Bronze	Third place
Green	Points classification
Blue	Non-points classification
Blue	Non-classified finish (NC)
Purple	Retired, not classified (Ret)
Red	Did not qualify (DNQ)
Red	Did not pre-qualify (DNPQ)
Black	Disqualified (DSQ)
White	Did not start (DNS)
White	Withdrew (WD)
White	Race cancelled (C)
Blank	Did not practice (DNP)
Blank	Did not arrive (DNA)
Blank	Excluded (EX)

**Bold** – Pole
Italics – Fastest Lap
