= 2006 Formula BMW USA season =

American formula racing 2006

Seasons
- ← 2005 2007 →

The 2006 Formula BMW USA season was the third season of the American Formula BMW championship for young drivers making the transition to car racing. The Overall Championship was won by Robert Wickens as the Rookie Cup was won by Daniel Morad.

== Teams and drivers ==
All cars were Mygale FB02 chassis powered by BMW engines.

| Team | No | Driver | Class | Rounds |
|---|---|---|---|---|
| (Canada) Team Autotecnica | 1 | (United States) Robert Thorne | R | All |
| (Canada) Team Autotecnica | 44 | (United States) Matt Lee | | All |
| (Canada) Jensen MotorSport | 2 | (United States) Frankie Muniz | | All |
| (Canada) Jensen MotorSport | 20 | (Mexico) David Farias | | 1–2 |
| (Canada) Jensen MotorSport | 20 | (United States) Alex Navejar | | 3 |
| (Canada) Jensen MotorSport | 20 | (United States) Tom Sutherland | | 4–5 |
| (United States) Gelles Racing | 3 | (Canada) Adrien Herberts | | All |
| (United States) Gelles Racing | 4 | (Canada) Ryan Campbell | | All |
| (United States) Gelles Racing | 5 | (Colombia) Sebastián Saavedra | R | All |
| (United States) Gelles Racing | 6 | (United States) John Zartarian | | All |
| (United States) Gelles Racing | 11 | (Canada) Maxime Pelletier | R | All |
| (United States) Gelles Racing | 22 | (Jamaica) Joel Jackson | R | All |
| (United States) HBR Motorsport USA | 7 | (Colombia) Steven Guerrero | R | All |
| (United States) HBR Motorsport USA | 8 | (United States) Race Johnson | | All |
| (United States) HBR Motorsport USA | 9 | (Canada) Yannick Hofman | | All |
| (United States) HBR Motorsport USA | 10 | (United States) Reed Stevens | | All |
| (United States) Hearn Motorsports | 12 | (United States) Jules Duc | | 1–6 |
| (United States) Hearn Motorsports | 16 | (United States) Ryan Phinny | | All |
| (United States) Hearn Motorsports | 99 | (Canada) Maryeve Dufault | | 3–4 |
| (United States) Hearn Motorsports | 99 | (Canada) Marco Di Leo | | 7 |
| (Canada) Atlantic Racing Team | 13 | (Germany) Tobias Hegewald | | 3–4 |
| (Canada) Atlantic Racing Team | 49 | (Canada) Philip Major | | All |
| (United States) Haberfeld & Walker Racing | 15 | (Mexico) David Rangel | | 1–5, 7 |
| (United States) Haberfeld & Walker Racing | 25 | (Brazil) Marco Santos | | All |
| (United States) Team Apex Racing USA | 19 | (Canada) Jordan Dick | R | All |
| (United States) Team Apex Racing USA | 66 | (Canada) Robert Wickens | | 1–4 |
| (United States) American Spirit Grand Prix | 21 | (United States) Scott Schroeder | | All |
| (United States) EuroInternational | 23 | (Mexico) David Garza | R | All |
| (United States) EuroInternational | 50 | (Switzerland) Simona de Silvestro | | All |
| (United States) EuroInternational | 55 | (Monaco) Stefano Coletti | | 3–4 |
| (United States) EuroInternational | 66 | (Canada) Robert Wickens | | 5–7 |
| (Canada) AIM Motorsport | 33 | (United States) Doug Boyer | | All |
| (Canada) AIM Motorsport | 70 | (Canada) Daniel Morad | R | All |

| Icon | Class |
|---|---|
| R | Rookie Cup |

== Races ==
| Round | | Circuit | Date | Pole position | Fastest lap | Winning driver | Winning team | Winning rookie |
|---|---|---|---|---|---|---|---|---|
| 1 | R1 | (United States) Mid-Ohio Sports Car Course | 20 May | (Mexico) David Garza | (Switzerland) Simona de Silvestro | (United States) Reed Stevens | (United States) HBR Motorsport USA | (Mexico) David Garza |
| 1 | R2 | (United States) Mid-Ohio Sports Car Course | 21 May | (Mexico) David Garza | (United States) John Zartarian | (Canada) Daniel Morad | (Canada) AIM Motorsport | (Canada) Daniel Morad |
| 2 | R1 | (United States) Lime Rock Park | 27 May | (Canada) Daniel Morad | (Canada) Daniel Morad | (Canada) Robert Wickens | (United States) Team Apex Racing USA | (Colombia) Sebastián Saavedra |
| 2 | R2 | (United States) Lime Rock Park | 29 May | (United States) Matt Lee | (Colombia) Sebastián Saavedra | (Switzerland) Simona de Silvestro | (United States) EuroInternational | (Canada) Daniel Morad |
| 3 | R1 | (Canada) Circuit Gilles Villeneuve | 24 June | (Monaco) Stefano Coletti | (Switzerland) Simona de Silvestro | (Monaco) Stefano Coletti | (United States) EuroInternational | (Canada) Daniel Morad |
| 3 | R2 | (Canada) Circuit Gilles Villeneuve | 25 June | (Monaco) Stefano Coletti | (Monaco) Stefano Coletti | (Monaco) Stefano Coletti | (United States) EuroInternational | (Canada) Maxime Pelletier |
| 4 | R1 | (United States) Indianapolis Motor Speedway | 1 July | (United States) Matt Lee | (Canada) Robert Wickens | (Canada) Robert Wickens | (United States) Team Apex Racing USA | (Colombia) Sebastián Saavedra |
| 4 | R2 | (United States) Indianapolis Motor Speedway | 2 July | (United States) Matt Lee | (Monaco) Stefano Coletti | (Monaco) Stefano Coletti | (United States) EuroInternational | (Colombia) Sebastián Saavedra |
| 5 | R1 | (United States) San Jose | 29 July | (Canada) Robert Wickens | (Canada) Robert Wickens | (United States) Reed Stevens | (United States) HBR Motorsport USA | (Mexico) David Garza |
| 5 | R2 | (United States) San Jose | 30 July | (Canada) Robert Wickens | (Canada) Robert Wickens | (Canada) Robert Wickens | (United States) Team Apex Racing USA | (Canada) Daniel Morad |
| 6 | R1 | (United States) Denver | 12 August | (United States) Matt Lee | (United States) Matt Lee | (United States) Matt Lee | (Canada) Team Autotecnica | (Canada) Daniel Morad |
| 6 | R2 | (United States) Denver | 13 August | (United States) Matt Lee | (United States) Ryan Phinny | (United States) Reed Stevens | (United States) HBR Motorsport USA | (Canada) Daniel Morad |
| 7 | R1 | (Canada) Mosport | 2 September | (United States) Race Johnson | (United States) Matt Lee | (United States) Reed Stevens | (United States) HBR Motorsport USA | (Canada) Daniel Morad |
| 7 | R2 | (Canada) Mosport | 3 September | (Canada) Robert Wickens | (United States) Matt Lee | (United States) Matt Lee | (Canada) Team Autotecnica | (United States) Robert Thorne |

== Standings ==
Points were awarded as follows:

| Position | **1st** | **2nd** | **3rd** | **4th** | **5th** | **6th** | **7th** | **8th** | **9th** | **10th** | **PP** |
| Points | 20 | 15 | 12 | 10 | 8 | 6 | 4 | 3 | 2 | 1 | 1 |

=== Drivers' Championship ===
| Pos | Driver | MOH (United States) | | LIM (United States) | | CGV (Canada) | | IMS (United States) | | SJO (United States) | | DEN (United States) | | MOS (Canada) | | Pts |
|---|---|---|---|---|---|---|---|---|---|---|---|---|---|---|---|---|
| 1 | (Canada) Robert Wickens | 2 | 18 | 1 | 7 | 3 | 9 | 1 | 2 | **17** | **1** | 4 | 3 | 4 | **6** | 149 |
| 2 | (United States) Matt Lee | 24 | 20 | 7 | **2** | 2 | 2 | **4** | **4** | 11 | 2 | **1** | **9** | 3 | 1 | 143 |
| 3 | (United States) Reed Stevens | 1 | 24 | 3 | 12 | 5 | 16 | DNS | 27 | 1 | 3 | 2 | 1 | 1 | 2 | 142 |
| 4 | (Switzerland) Simona de Silvestro | 4 | 25 | 2 | 1 | 4 | 3 | 3 | 3 | 4 | 4 | 21 | 6 | 2 | 10 | 133 |
| 5 | (Monaco) Stefano Coletti | | | | | **1** | **1** | 2 | 1 | | | | | | | 77 |
| 6 | (Canada) Daniel Morad | 14 | 1 | **24** | 3 | 6 | 26 | 13 | 13 | 24 | 5 | 5 | 4 | 6 | 9 | 72 |
| 7 | (United States) John Zartarian | 8 | 2 | 16 | 4 | 9 | 27 | 18 | 18 | 6 | 6 | 3 | 7 | 5 | 8 | 69 |
| 8 | (United States) Race Johnson | 6 | 7 | 6 | 6 | 8 | 25 | 27 | 16 | 5 | 8 | 8 | 11 | **20** | 4 | 47 |
| 9 | (Mexico) David Garza | **3** | **8** | 5 | 17 | 21 | 15 | 12 | 10 | 3 | 9 | 10 | 8 | 14 | 25 | 44 |
| 10 | (United States) Ryan Phinny | 13 | 12 | 12 | 20 | DSQ | 5 | 6 | 6 | 10 | 22 | 6 | 2 | 10 | 11 | 43 |
| 11 | (Colombia) Sebastián Saavedra | 9 | 5 | 4 | 10 | 14 | 29 | 8 | 9 | 16 | 23 | 7 | 5 | 9 | 23 | 40 |
| 12 | (Canada) Adrien Herberts | 7 | 3 | 18 | 9 | 26 | 12 | 17 | 24 | 25 | 12 | 20 | 10 | 13 | 3 | 31 |
| 13 | (United States) Tom Sutherland | | | | | | | 7 | 15 | 2 | 7 | | | | | 23 |
| 14 | (Germany) Tobias Hegewald | | | | | 10 | 6 | 5 | 5 | | | | | | | 23 |
| 15 | (United States) Doug Boyer | 5 | 22 | 14 | 14 | 25 | 4 | DNS | 25 | 8 | 24 | 23 | 12 | 12 | 21 | 21 |
| 16 | (Canada) Maxime Pelletier | 10 | 11 | 8 | 5 | 13 | 11 | 14 | 12 | 7 | 11 | 14 | 16 | 21 | 7 | 20 |
| 17 | (Canada) Ryan Campbell | 11 | 4 | 13 | 13 | 7 | 28 | 15 | 14 | 19 | 10 | 12 | 14 | 25 | 15 | 15 |
| 18 | (United States) Robert Thorne | 12 | 9 | 9 | 15 | DSQ | 18 | 19 | 23 | 21 | 25 | 9 | 17 | 23 | 5 | 14 |
| 19 | (United States) Scott Schroeder | 18 | 6 | 11 | 24 | 15 | 13 | 10 | 8 | 9 | 19 | 16 | 20 | 15 | 24 | 12 |
| 20 | (Canada) Yannick Hofman | 21 | 14 | 25 | 23 | 17 | 7 | 22 | 7 | 22 | 14 | 13 | 13 | 11 | 18 | 8 |
| 21 | (Canada) Philip Major | 16 | 21 | 19 | 11 | 12 | 8 | 9 | 11 | 23 | 16 | 11 | 15 | 24 | 22 | 5 |
| 22 | (Canada) Jordan Dick | 19 | 10 | 10 | 8 | 11 | 24 | 26 | 17 | 12 | 20 | 22 | 24 | 16 | 12 | 5 |
| 23 | (Canada) Marco Di Leo | | | | | | | | | | | | | 7 | 14 | 4 |
| 24 | (Colombia) Steven Guerrero | 22 | 23 | 15 | 19 | 19 | 14 | 11 | 28 | 13 | 15 | 24 | 18 | 8 | 16 | 3 |
| 25 | (United States) Alex Navejar | | | | | 18 | 10 | | | | | | | | | 1 |
| 26 | (Jamaica) Joel Jackson | 25 | DNS | 22 | 16 | 16 | 21 | 21 | 29 | 14 | 13 | 18 | 19 | 22 | 17 | 0 |
| 27 | (Mexico) David Rangel | 26 | 15 | 23 | 25 | 22 | 19 | 23 | 20 | 26 | 26 | | | 18 | 13 | 0 |
| 28 | (United States) Jules Duc | 17 | 13 | DSQ | 21 | 23 | 20 | 20 | 22 | 18 | 18 | 19 | 23 | | | 0 |
| 29 | (Brazil) Marco Santos | 15 | 19 | 21 | 22 | 20 | 17 | 24 | 21 | 15 | 17 | 15 | 21 | 19 | 20 | 0 |
| 30 | (United States) Frankie Muniz | 20 | 17 | 20 | 18 | DSQ | 22 | 16 | 19 | 20 | 21 | 17 | 22 | 17 | 19 | 0 |
| 31 | (Mexico) David Farias | 23 | 16 | 17 | DNS | | | | | | | | | | | 0 |
| 32 | (Canada) Maryeve Dufault | | | | | 24 | 23 | 25 | 26 | | | | | | | 0 |
| Pos | Driver | MOH (United States) | | LIM (United States) | | CGV (Canada) | | IMS (United States) | | SJO (United States) | | DEN (United States) | | MOS (Canada) | | Pts |

| Colour | Result |
|---|---|
| Gold | Winner |
| Silver | Second place |
| Bronze | Third place |
| Green | Points classification |
| Blue | Non-points classification |
| Blue | Non-classified finish (NC) |
| Purple | Retired, not classified (Ret) |
| Red | Did not qualify (DNQ) |
| Red | Did not pre-qualify (DNPQ) |
| Black | Disqualified (DSQ) |
| White | Did not start (DNS) |
| White | Withdrew (WD) |
| White | Race cancelled (C) |
| Blank | Did not practice (DNP) |
| Blank | Did not arrive (DNA) |
| Blank | Excluded (EX) |

**Bold** – Pole
Italics – Fastest Lap

=== Rookie Cup ===
| Pos | Driver | MOH (United States) | | LIM (United States) | | CGV (Canada) | | IMS (United States) | | SJO (United States) | | DEN (United States) | | MOS (Canada) | | Pts |
|---|---|---|---|---|---|---|---|---|---|---|---|---|---|---|---|---|
| 1 | (Canada) Daniel Morad | 5 | 1 | 8 | 1 | 1 | 7 | 4 | 4 | 8 | 1 | 1 | 1 | 1 | 3 | 189 |
| 2 | (Colombia) Sebastián Saavedra | 2 | 2 | 1 | 4 | 4 | NC | 1 | 1 | 6 | 7 | 2 | 2 | 3 | 7 | 166 |
| 3 | (Canada) Maxime Pelletier | 3 | 6 | 3 | 2 | 3 | 1 | 5 | 3 | 2 | 3 | 5 | 4 | 6 | 2 | 163 |
| 4 | (Mexico) David Garza | 1 | 3 | 2 | 7 | 7 | 3 | 3 | 2 | 1 | 2 | 4 | 3 | 4 | NC | 161 |
| 5 | (United States) Robert Thorne | 4 | 4 | 4 | 5 | DSQ | 4 | 6 | 6 | 7 | NC | 3 | 5 | NC | 1 | 104 |
| 6 | (Canada) Jordan Dick | 6 | 5 | 5 | 3 | 2 | 6 | NC | 5 | 3 | 6 | 7 | NC | 5 | 4 | 103 |
| 7 | (Colombia) Steven Guerrero | 7 | NC | 6 | 8 | 6 | 2 | 2 | NC | 4 | 5 | NC | 6 | 2 | 5 | 96 |
| 8 | (Jamaica) Joel Jackson | 8 | DNS | 7 | 6 | 5 | 5 | 7 | NC | 5 | 4 | 6 | 7 | 7 | 6 | 71 |
