= Esteban Gutiérrez =

Mexican racing driver (born 1991)

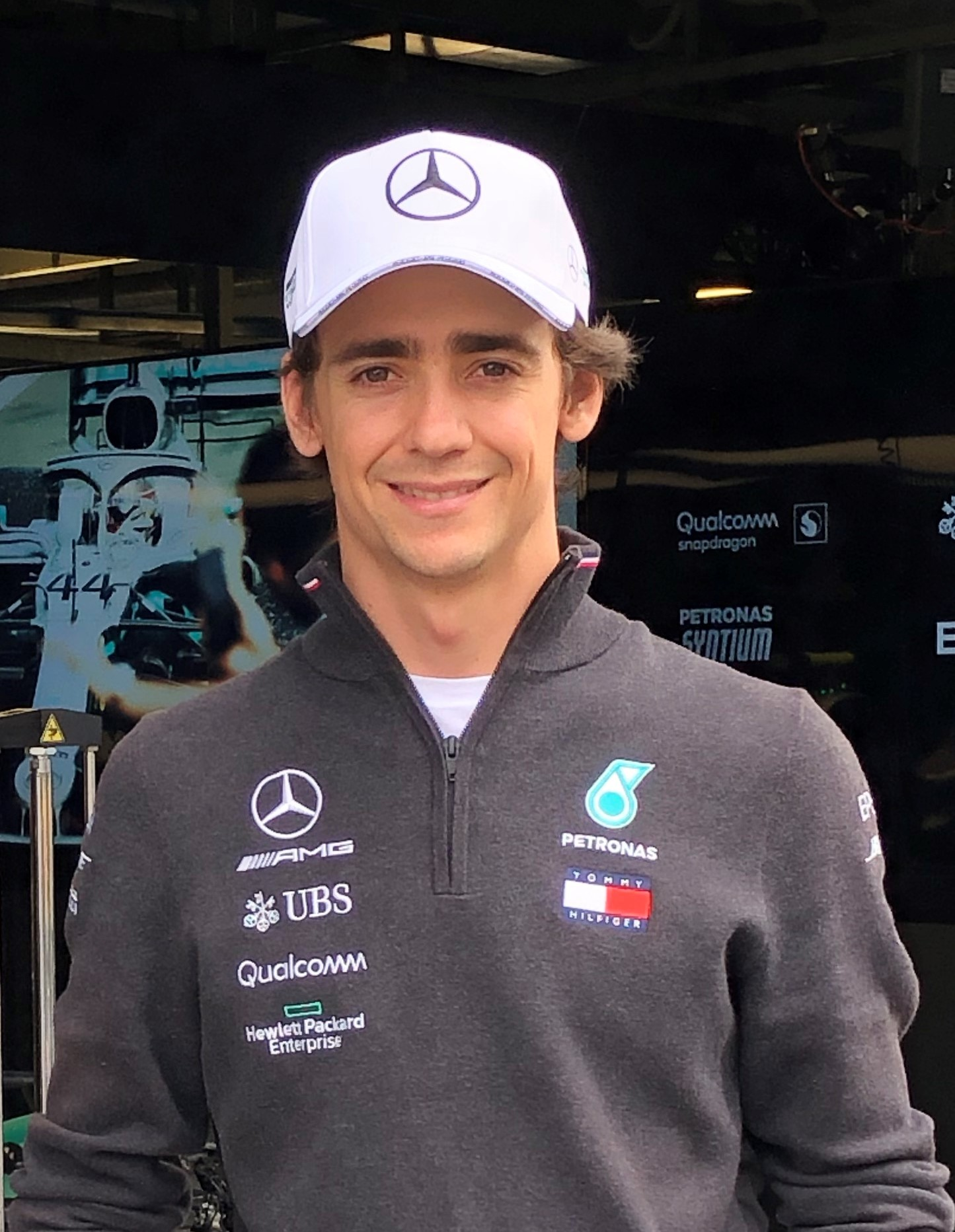
- Gutiérrez at the 2019 Italian Grand Prix
- Born: Esteban Manuel Gutiérrez Gutiérrez; 5 August 1991 (age 35); Monterrey, Nuevo León, Mexico
- Spouse: Mónica Casán (m. 2017)
- Relatives: José Gutiérrez (brother)

Formula One World Championship career
- Nationality: (Mexico) Mexican
- Active years: 2013–2014, 2016
- Team(s): Sauber, Haas
- Car number: 21
- Entries: 59
- Wins: 0
- Podiums: 0
- Career points: 6
- Pole positions: 0
- Fastest laps: 1
- First entry: 2013 Australian Grand Prix
- Last entry: 2016 Abu Dhabi Grand Prix

24 Hours of Le Mans career
- Years: 2022–2023
- Teams: Glickenhaus
- Best finish: 7th (2023)
- Categorisation: FIA Platinum

Previous series
- 2011–2012 2011 2010 2009–2010 2009–2010 2008 2007: GP2 Series; GP2 Asia Series; GP3 Series; F3 Euro Series; British F3; Formula BMW Europe; Formula BMW USA

Championship titles
- 2010 2008: GP3 Series; Formula BMW Europe

Esteban Manuel Gutiérrez Gutiérrez (Spanish pronunciation: [esˈteβan maˈnwel ɣuˈtieres ɣuˈtieres]; born 5 August 1991) is a Mexican former racing driver and businessman, who competed in Formula One from 2013 to 2016.

Previously, from 2013 to 2014, Gutiérrez drove for the Sauber Formula One team but lost his drive at the end of the 2014 season. He then signed with Ferrari as their test and reserve driver for 2015. Gutiérrez drove for the Haas F1 Team for the 2016 Formula One season.

In 2008, Gutiérrez won the Formula BMW Europe championship title, becoming the youngest Mexican driver to win an International Championship at 17 years old. He also won the inaugural GP3 season in 2010. With the Lotus GP team in 2012, he became the first GP3 graduate to finish in the top three of the GP2 parent series.

Gutiérrez has also raced in Formula E and the IndyCar Series. His younger brother José Gutiérrez is also a racing driver. Gutiérrez has been a brand ambassador for Mercedes in Formula One since 2024, and is the founder of EDASI Drive, the licensed Formula One merchandise distributor for Latin America.

== Personal life ==
Gutiérrez was born in Monterrey, Nuevo León, the second of four brothers and one sister. He currently lives in London.

== Early career ==
=== Karting ===
Gutiérrez started his career in 2004 in the Mexican Rotax Max Challenge when he raced in the last three events of the season. In 2005, he again competed in the Mexican Rotax Max Challenge, and also raced in the Grand Nationals in South Bend, Indiana, where he finished third, which earned him a place at the World Finals in Malaysia, where he finished 22nd due to mechanical problems.

In 2006, Gutiérrez won all five races in the Camkart Challenge Mexico, winning the title, and again he raced in the Mexican Rotax Max Challenge. He also finished fourth in the Mexican Grand Nationals in Zacatecas, Mexico.

=== Formula BMW Series ===
==== 2007–2008 ====
In 2007, Gutiérrez made the step up into the single-seater ranks, competing in the Formula BMW USA series. He finished second overall in the championship, with four wins, eight podiums, nine pole positions and three fastest laps, earning him Rookie of the Year honours. Despite finishing second, Gutiérrez finished some 87 points behind runaway champion Daniel Morad. Gutiérrez raced at the Formula BMW World Final in 2007, eventually finishing last of the classified finishers in 25th.

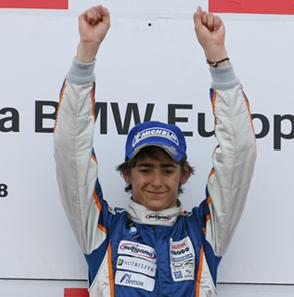
Gutiérrez winning the 2008 Formula BMW Europe championship

Gutiérrez moved across to Europe to compete in the 2008 Formula BMW Europe championship, which was the championship's maiden season after the merging of the British and German series. He won the championship by 26 points from his closest rival Marco Wittmann, taking seven wins, six of which consecutively, and appearing on the podium another five times. Out of the seasons sixteen races, he only finished outside the points twice in the whole season and retired once overall, giving him a final score of 353 points.

In his final FBMW race, Gutiérrez qualified on pole and finished third at the 2008 World Final in Mexico City, beaten only by the current FBMW Americas champion at the time Alexander Rossi and Michael Christensen.

=== Formula 3 Euro Series ===
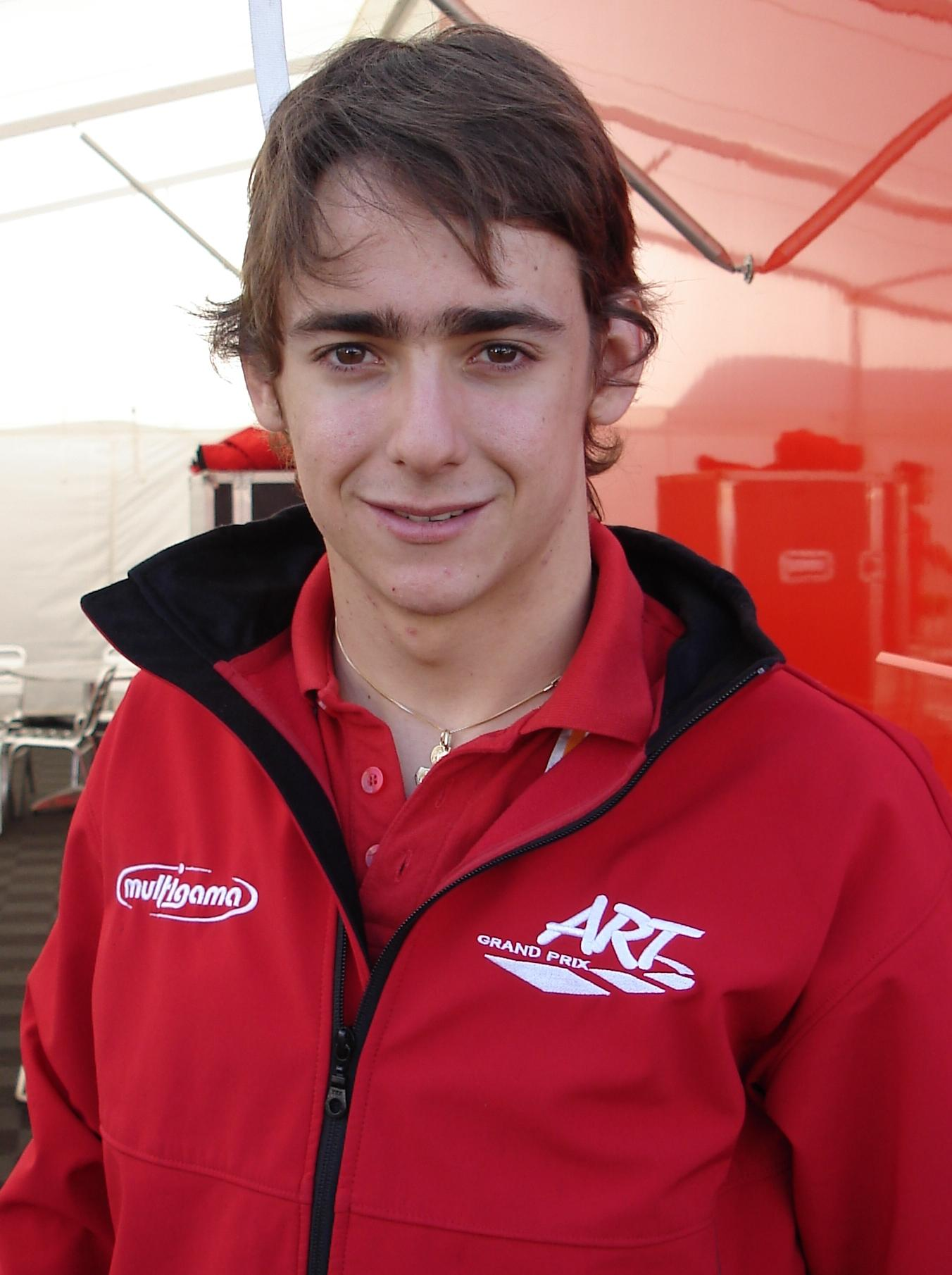
Picture taken during the DTM race weekend at the Hockenheimring

For 2009, Gutiérrez moved up to the Formula 3 Euro Series with a seat at reigning champions ART Grand Prix alongside Jules Bianchi, Valtteri Bottas and Adrien Tambay. He finished ninth overall in the championship, taking two podiums at the Nürburgring and Dijon Prenois.

Gutiérrez ended the season with 26 points altogether. He also competed in two rounds of the British Formula 3 season, taking a podium and fastest lap at the Algarve International Circuit, racing against eventual champion Daniel Ricciardo.

=== GP3 Series ===
2010 saw Gutiérrez move to the GP3 Series, competing for ART Grand Prix. He joined Pedro Nunes and Alexander Rossi at the team. Gutiérrez won the inaugural season with two races to spare by taking pole position, and the resultant two bonus points that came with it, for the final race weekend in Monza. Gutiérrez dominated the whole season as he scored ten times out of the sixteen races, with eight podium finishes and five wins.

=== GP2 Series ===
==== 2009 ====
Gutiérrez was invited to the GP2 test in Jerez, Spain for the 2009 season on 6 October for ART Grand Prix, his first time in a GP2 car. During the day, he improved on his times finishing with a time just over half a second slower than the fastest time set by Jules Bianchi, who was also driving for ART. He was also recognised as the third fastest rookie of the day. Gutiérrez again participated in another test session for GP2 at the end of year test in Paul Ricard, France for Telmex Arden International.

==== 2010 ====
At the end of 2010, after winning the inaugural GP3 season with ART, the GP2 sister team signed Gutiérrez for a full drive for the 2011 season.

==== 2011 ====
ART Grand Prix was renamed Lotus ART for the 2011. Gutiérrez was paired with Jules Bianchi for both the GP2 series and GP2 Asia series. He finished eleventh in the 2011 GP2 Asia series after taking a single fourth-place finish at the Imola sprint race.

In the main series, Gutiérrez finished 13th in the drivers' championship after he scored his first points with a seventh-place finish in the Valencia feature race. He followed this up with his first GP2 series victory at the sprint race as well as setting his first fastest lap scoring twice more that season including a second-place finish in the sprint race at Hungary.

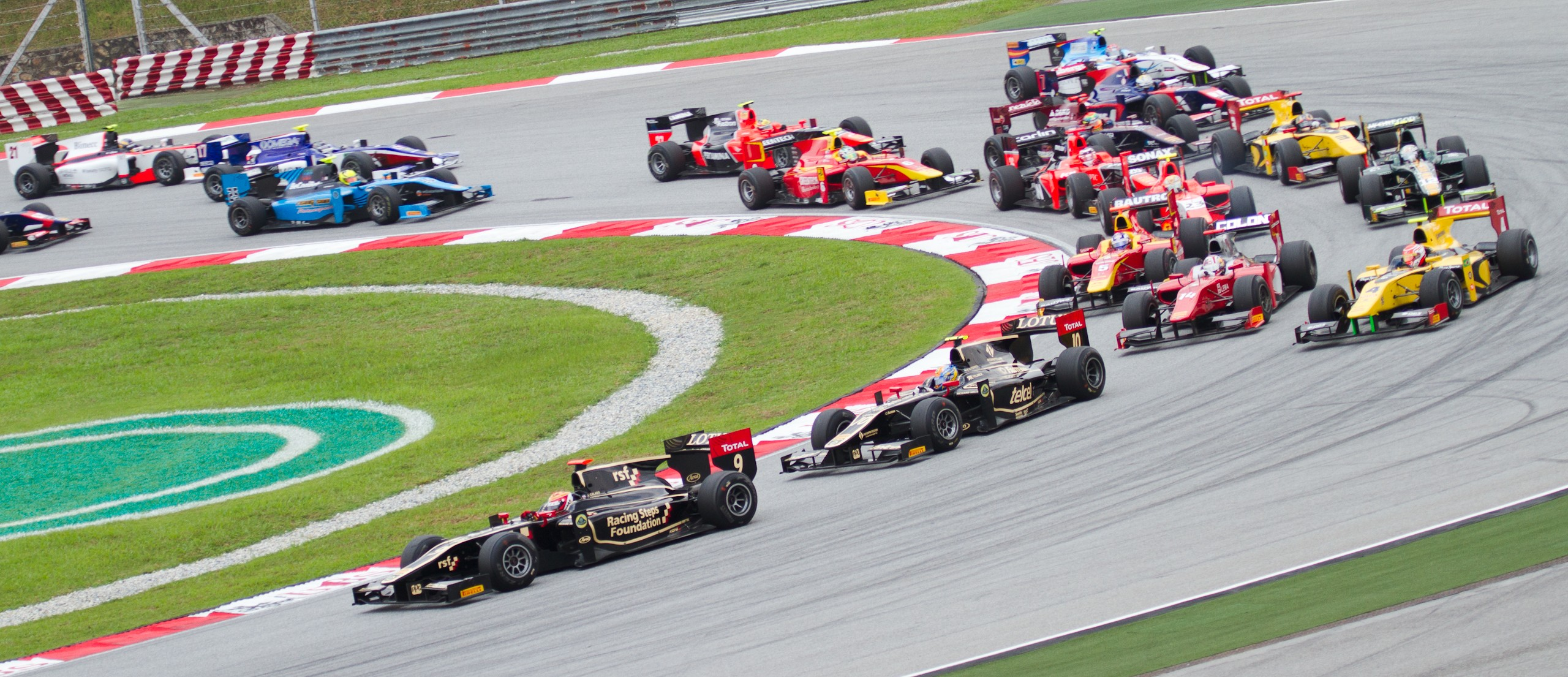
Gutiérrez follows teammate James Calado in the lead out of the first corner at the 2012 Malaysian Sprint race.

==== 2012 ====
Gutiérrez remained with Lotus ART for the 2012 season, with the team being renamed Lotus GP after the increased sponsorship from Lotus, and was partnered with James Calado. His third place in the championship marked him the first GP3 graduate to finish in the top-three of the GP2 series, with 176 points, three wins, four other separate podiums and five fastest laps, equalling Valsecchi's total for the year for most fastest laps of the season.

== Formula One ==
Gutiérrez first tested a BMW Sauber Formula One car in December 2009 as part of his prize for winning the Formula BMW Europe championship. Despite the team losing its BMW backing for 2010, he joined it as an observer for some race weekends and was placed on the same training programme as race drivers Pedro de la Rosa and Kamui Kobayashi. Later in the season, he was officially named as the team's test and reserve driver on 10 September. On 16 November 2010, he took part in the young drivers test in Abu Dhabi setting the fourth fastest time of the day, just over six-tenths of a second off the qualifying time set by Kamui Kobayashi.

On 26 October 2012, Gutiérrez participated in the first free practice session at the Indian Grand Prix, substituting for an unwell Pérez. He ultimately recorded the twentieth fastest time in the session, before Pérez was able to return to the car for the second session.

=== Sauber (2013–2014) ===
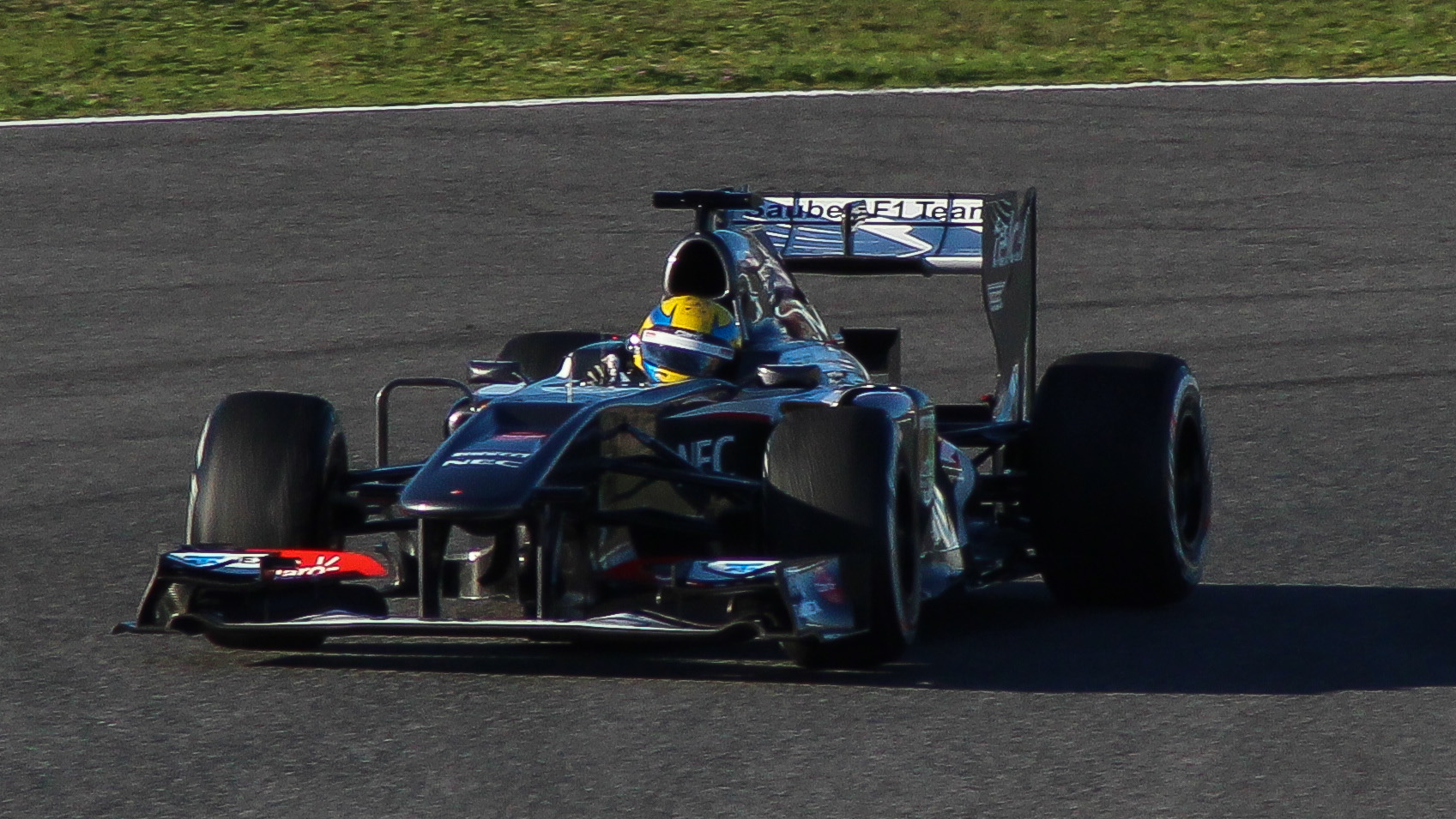
Gutiérrez in the Sauber C32 during winter tests at Jerez, in 2013

In 2013, Gutiérrez was promoted to the race team with Sauber, alongside Nico Hülkenberg who joined from Force India. His first outing for the team was the Australian Grand Prix, where he qualified in 18th position. After a solid drive he eventually finished the race 13th, the best position of all of the 2013 rookies. In Malaysia, Gutiérrez made it through into Q2 and qualified 14th, and finished in 12th, after he was forced to pit with five laps remaining.

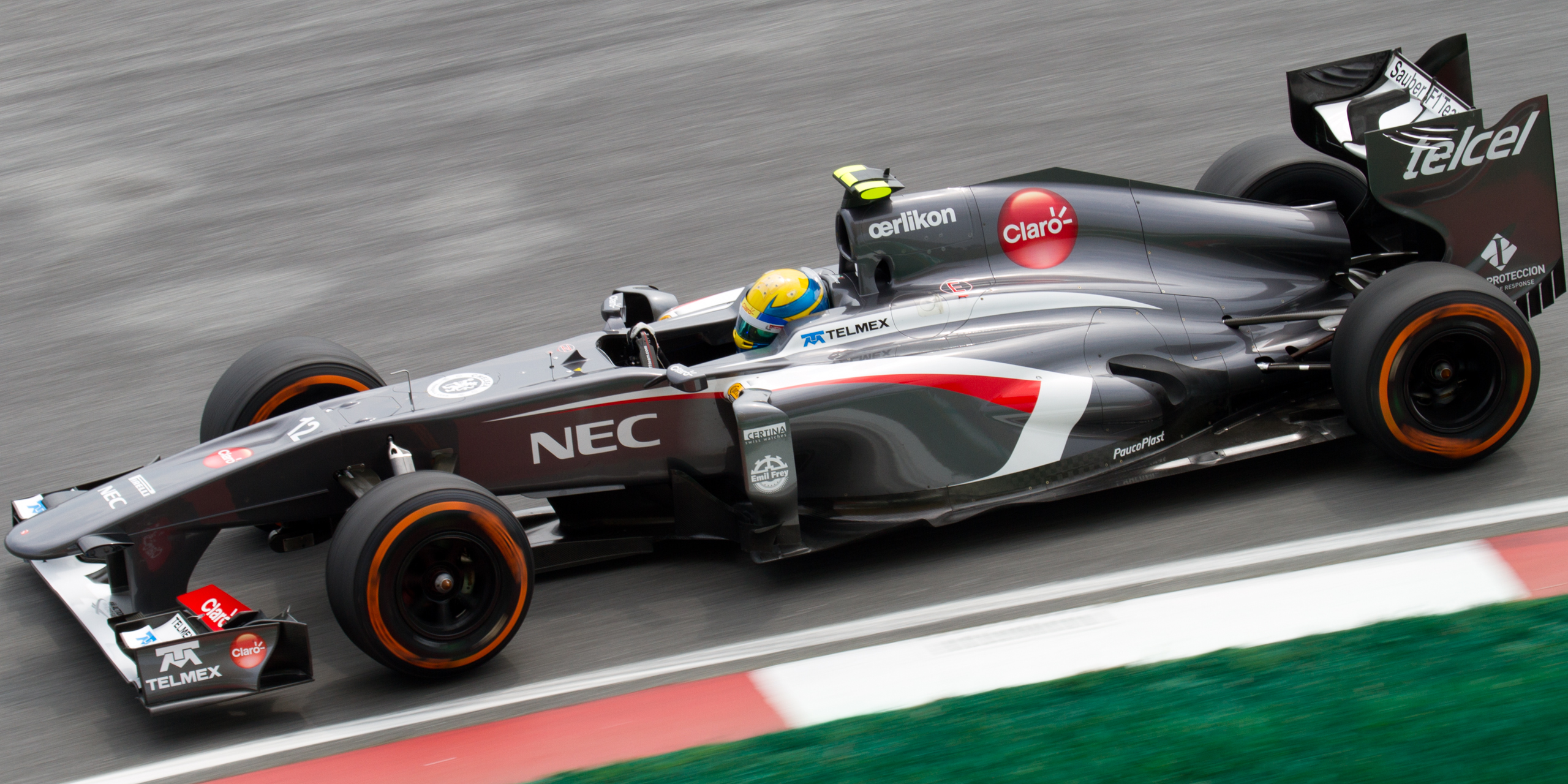
Gutiérrez during FP1 in Malaysia

Spain saw Gutiérrez achieve his first fastest lap of the race, putting him second in the record books for 'Youngest Driver to Set a Fastest Lap' after Nico Rosberg.

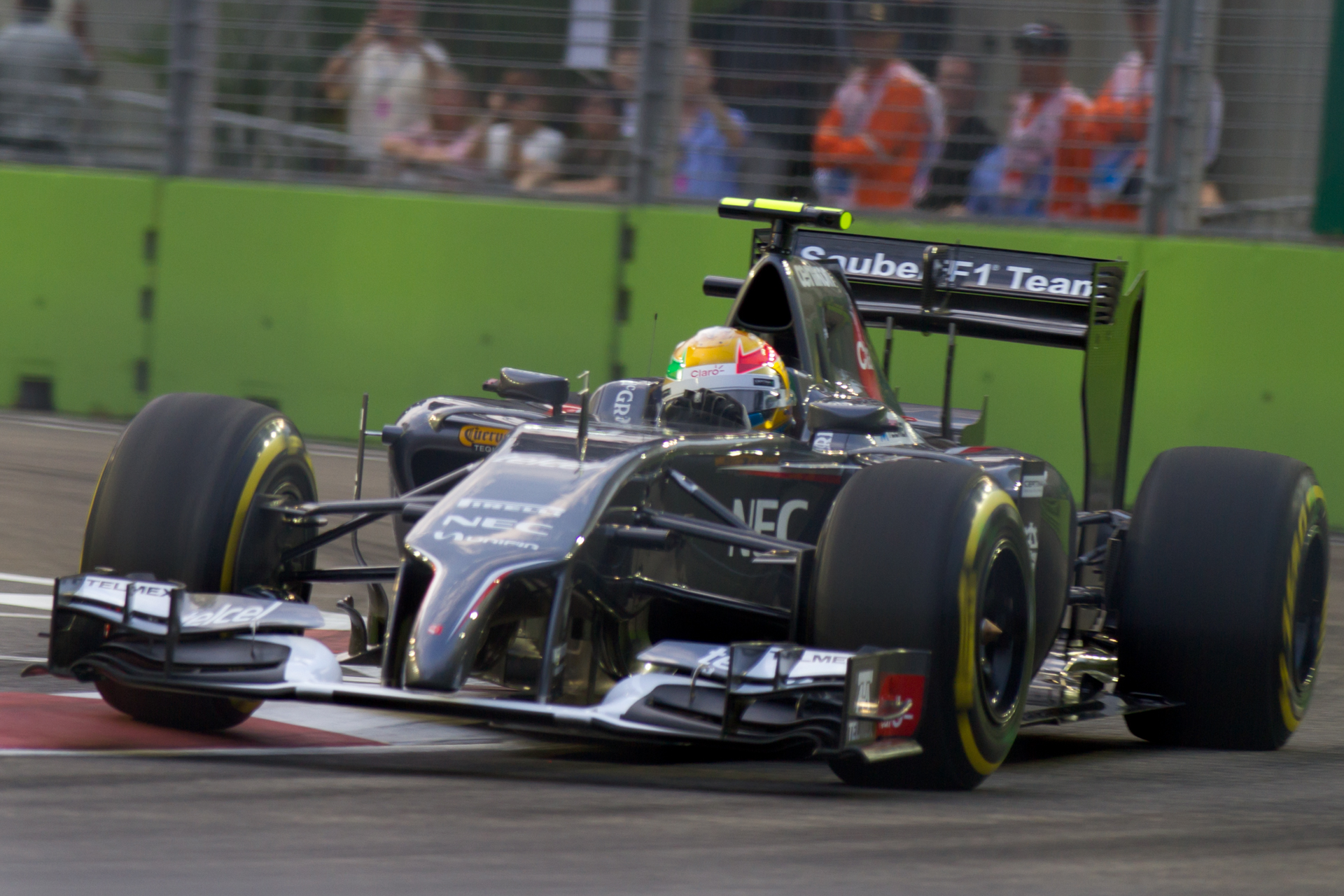
Gutiérrez at the 2014 Singapore Grand Prix

Gutiérrez achieved his first and only points-scoring finish of his career at the Japanese Grand Prix; having started 14th on the grid, Gutiérrez made his way up the order and eventually finished the race in seventh place, holding off Nico Rosberg in the closing stages.

=== Ferrari (2015) ===
On 15 December 2014, Gutiérrez was announced as Scuderia Ferrari test and reserve driver for the 2015 Formula One season, in place of the late Jules Bianchi.

=== Haas F1 (2016) ===
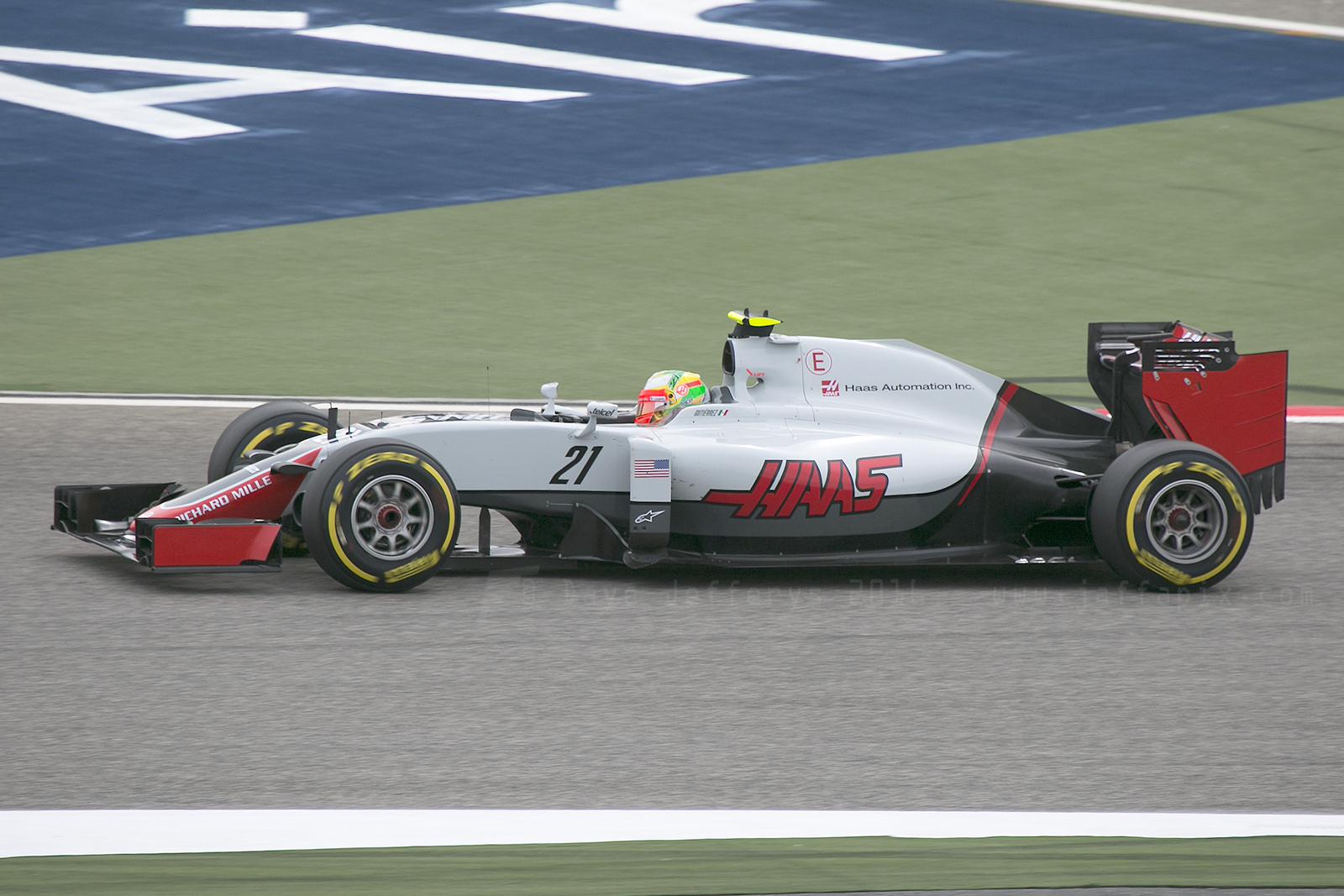
Gutiérrez driving for Haas at the 2016 Bahrain Grand Prix

On 31 October 2015, at the Mexican Grand Prix, it was announced that Gutiérrez would return to racing in the sport alongside Romain Grosjean at Haas F1 Team.

Gutiérrez finished 14th at the Chinese Grand Prix, passing ex-teammate Nico Hülkenberg in the closing laps. Gutiérrez finished 11th at the Monaco Grand Prix, Austrian Grand Prix, German Grand Prix, Singapore Grand Prix and 12th at the Abu Dhabi Grand Prix.

On 11 November 2016, Gutiérrez confirmed via social media he would be leaving Haas F1 Team.

=== Reserve and development driver for Mercedes (2018–present) ===
On 5 July 2018, Gutiérrez joined Mercedes AMG as a simulator driver from the beginning of the season. He has since been named as a reserve driver in Formula 1 and Formula E. Gutiérrez frequently visits the team's factory to carry out simulator work in preparation for F1 races and development of its car, supporting race drivers Andrea Kimi Antonelli and George Russell.

In 2020, with the postponement and cancellation of races due to the COVID-19 pandemic, Gutiérrez represented Mercedes in the virtual world taking part in several high-profile esports events. It was discovered in August 2020 that Gutiérrez had stopped being eligible for a super licence at the start of the year after the introduction of new requirements to maintain them after more than three years, which had been overlooked by Mercedes and made him ineligible to be a reserve driver in Formula One. He continues to work for Mercedes in 2021 as a brand and business ambassador.

== Formula E ==
On 10 January 2017, Gutiérrez announced that he would be joining Formula E, for selected races during the 2016–17 season. On 9 March 2017, it was announced Gutiérrez would replace Ma Qing Hua at Techeetah, from the fourth round onwards. He competed at the Mexico City, Monaco and Paris ePrix and finished within the top-ten twice. He achieved a season finish of 22nd with the five points he gained from his three races.

== IndyCar ==
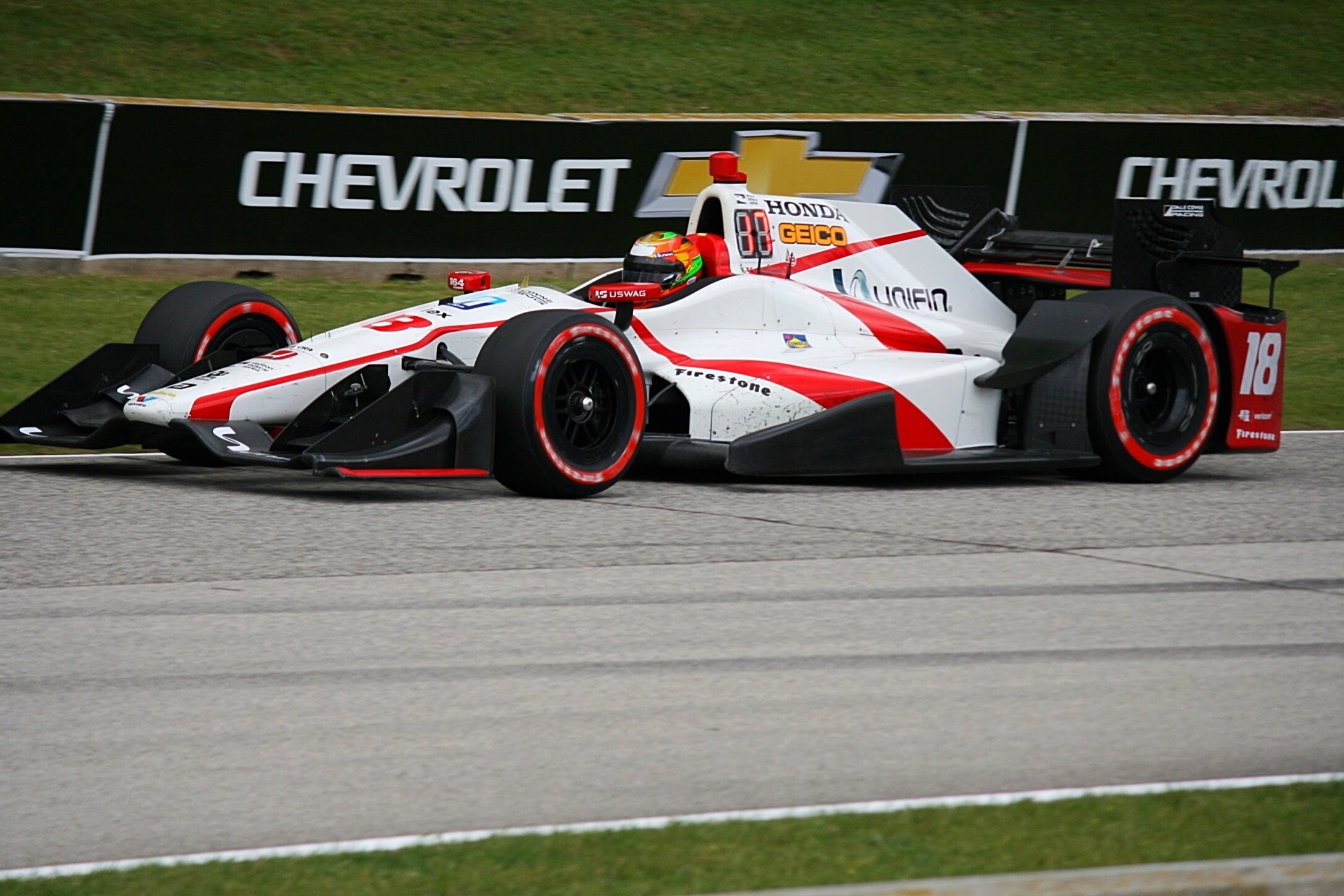
Gutiérrez racing for Dale Coyne Racing at Road America, in 2017

On 1 June 2017, it was announced that Gutiérrez would be joining the IndyCar Series for the Chevrolet Detroit Grand Prix Presented by Lear Corporation, standing in for the injured Sébastien Bourdais at Dale Coyne Racing. Gutiérrez participated in seven events, and had a best finish of 13th at Iowa Speedway.

== Esports ==
During the 2020 COVID-19 pandemic and subsequent lockdown, relatively new to esports, Gutiérrez began participating in a variety of esports events, taking multiple wins and podium finishes.

Gutiérrez competed in the F1 Esports Virtual Grand Prix Series and The Race All Stars, where he was fighting for the title until a technical glitch took him out of contention in the final round. Since the culmination of these events, Gutiérrez has continued streaming on his dedicated channel on Twitch and Discord.

== Racing record ==
=== Career summary ===
Season	Series	Team	Races	Wins	Poles	F/Laps	Podiums	Points	Position
2007	Formula BMW USA	Team Autotecnica	14	4	9	2	8	436	**2nd**
2007	Formula BMW World Final	Team Autotecnica	1	0	0	0	0	N/A	25th
2007	Formula BMW ADAC	Esteban Gutiérrez	2	0	0	1	0	46	26th
2008	Formula BMW Europe	Josef Kaufmann Racing	16	7	3	9	12	353	**1st**
2008	Formula BMW World Final	Josef Kaufmann Racing	1	0	1	0	1	N/A	**3rd**
2008	German Formula 3 Championship	Josef Kaufmann Racing	2	0	0	0	0	0	NC^{†}
2008	International Formula Master	Trident Racing	2	0	0	0	1	8	19th
2009	Formula 3 Euro Series	ART Grand Prix	20	0	0	0	2	26	9th
2009	British Formula 3 International Series	ART Grand Prix	4	0	0	1	1	0	NC^{†}
2009	Masters of Formula 3	ART Grand Prix	1	0	0	0	0	N/A	17th
2010	GP3 Series	ART Grand Prix	16	5	3	7	9	88	**1st**
2010	Formula 3 Euro Series	ART Grand Prix	2	0	0	0	0	0	NC^{†}
2010	British Formula 3 International Series	ART Grand Prix	3	0	0	0	0	0	NC^{†}
2011	GP2 Series	Lotus ART	18	1	0	1	2	15	13th
2011	GP2 Asia Series	Lotus ART	4	0	0	0	0	3	11th
2011	GP2 Final	Lotus ART	2	0	0	0	0	2	8th
2011	Formula One	Sauber F1 Team	Test driver						
2012	GP2 Series	Lotus GP	24	3	0	5	7	176	**3rd**
2012	Formula One	Sauber F1 Team	Test driver						
2013	Formula One	Sauber F1 Team	19	0	0	1	0	6	16th
2014	Formula One	Sauber F1 Team	19	0	0	0	0	0	20th
2015	Formula One	Scuderia Ferrari	Test driver						
2016	Formula One	Haas F1 Team	21	0	0	0	0	0	21st
2016–17	Formula E	Techeetah	3	0	0	0	0	5	22nd
2017	IndyCar Series	Dale Coyne Racing	7	0	0	0	0	91	25th
2018	Formula One	Mercedes-AMG Petronas Motorsport	Development driver						
2019	Formula One	Mercedes-AMG Petronas Motorsport	Reserve driver						
2019–20	Formula E	Mercedes-EQ Formula E Team	Reserve/Development driver						
2020	Formula One	Mercedes-AMG Petronas F1 Team	Reserve driver						
2021	Formula One	Mercedes-AMG Petronas F1 Team	Development driver						
2022	FIA World Endurance Championship - LMP2	Inter Europol Competition	6	0	0	0	0	20	15th
2022	24 Hours of Le Mans - LMP2	Inter Europol Competition	1	0	0	0	0	N/A	13th
2022	Historic Grand Prix of Monaco - Series D	Team BRM	1	0	0	0	0	N/A	13th
2022	Formula One	Mercedes-AMG Petronas F1 Team	Development driver						
2023	IMSA SportsCar Championship - LMP2	CrowdStrike Racing by APR	1	0	0	0	1	0	NC‡
2023	24 Hours of Le Mans - Hypercar	Glickenhaus Racing	1	0	0	0	0	N/A	7th

^{†} As Gutiérrez was a guest driver, he was ineligible for points. ^{‡} Points only counted towards the Michelin Endurance Cup, and not the overall LMP2 Championship. ^{*} Season still in progress.

=== Complete Formula BMW USA results ===
(key) (Races in bold indicate pole position; races in italics indicate fastest lap)

Year	Entrant	1	2	3	4	5	6	7	8	9	10	11	12	13	14	DC	Points
2007	Team Autotecnica	**MMP**; **1**; 4	**MMP**; **2**; 1	**CGV**; **1**; 2	**CGV**; **2**; 6	**IMS**; **1**; 3	**IMS**; **2**; 1	LIM; 1 Ret	LIM; 2; 17	SJO; 1 DSQ	**SJO**; **2**; 1	ROA; 1; 2	**ROA**; **2**; 1	**MOS**; **1**; 12	MOS; 2; 2	2nd	436

=== Complete Formula BMW Europe results ===
(key) (Races in bold indicate pole position; races in italics indicate fastest lap)

Year	Entrant	1	2	3	4	5	6	7	8	9	10	11	12	13	14	15	16	DC	Points
2008	Josef Kaufmann Racing	CAT; 1; 3	CAT; 2; 2	ZOL; 1; 1	ZOL; 2; 1	SIL; 1; 1	SIL; 2; 1	**HOC**; **1**; 1	**HOC**; **2**; 1	HUN; 1 Ret	HUN; 2; 2	VSC; 1; 2	**VSC**; **2**; 1	SPA; 1; 17	SPA; 2; 8	MNZ; 1; 4	MNZ; 2; 3	1st	353

=== Complete Formula 3 Euro Series results ===
(key) (Races in bold indicate pole position; races in italics indicate fastest lap)

Year	Entrant	Chassis	Engine	1	2	3	4	5	6	7	8	9	10	11	12	13	14	15	16	17	18	19	20	DC	Points
2009	ART Grand Prix	Dallara F308/070	Mercedes	HOC; 1; 16	HOC; 2 Ret	LAU; 1; 24	LAU; 2; 11	NOR; 1; 4	NOR; 2; 12	ZAN; 1; 5	ZAN; 2; 7	OSC; 1; 9	OSC; 2; 9	NÜR; 1; 3	NÜR; 2; 6	BRH; 1; 7	BRH; 2; 5	CAT; 1 Ret	CAT; 2; 9	DIJ; 1; 12	DIJ; 2; 3	HOC; 1; 11	HOC; 2; 6	9th	26
2010	ART Grand Prix	Dallara F308/049	Mercedes	LEC; 1	LEC; 2	HOC; 1; 6	HOC; 2 Ret	VAL; 1	VAL; 2	NOR; 1	NOR; 2	NÜR; 1	NÜR; 2	ZAN; 1	ZAN; 2	BRH; 1	BRH; 2	OSC; 1	OSC; 2	HOC; 1	HOC; 2			NC^{†}	0

^{†} As Gutiérrez was a guest driver, he was ineligible for points.

=== Complete GP3 Series results ===
(key) (Races in bold indicate pole position; races in italics indicate fastest lap)

Year	Entrant	1	2	3	4	5	6	7	8	9	10	11	12	13	14	15	16	DC	Points
2010	ART Grand Prix	CAT; FEA; 3	CAT; SPR; 3	IST; FEA; 1	IST; SPR; 7	**VAL**; **FEA**; 1	VAL; SPR; 7	**SIL**; **FEA**; 1	SIL; SPR; 3	HOC; FEA; 4	HOC; SPR; 1	HUN; FEA; 2	HUN; SPR; 5	SPA; FEA; 16	SPA; SPR; 7	**MNZ**; **FEA**; 1	MNZ; SPR; Ret	1st	88

=== Complete GP2 Series results ===
(key) (Races in bold indicate pole position; races in italics indicate fastest lap)

Year	Entrant	1	2	3	4	5	6	7	8	9	10	11	12	13	14	15	16	17	18	19	20	21	22	23	24	DC	Points
2011	Lotus ART	IST; FEA; Ret	IST; SPR; 11	CAT; FEA; Ret	CAT; SPR; 12	MON; FEA; 12	MON; SPR; DNS	VAL; FEA; 7	VAL; SPR; 1	SIL; FEA; 10	SIL; SPR; 8	NÜR; FEA; 12	NÜR; SPR; Ret	HUN; FEA; Ret	HUN; SPR; 2	SPA; FEA; 14	SPA; SPR; 7	MNZ; FEA; 9	MNZ; SPR; 6							13th	15
2012	Lotus GP	SEP; FEA; 7	SEP; SPR; 2	BHR1; FEA; 3	BHR1; SPR; 2	BHR2; FEA; 10	BHR2; SPR; 4	CAT; FEA; 10	CAT; SPR; 7	MON; FEA; 23†	MON; SPR; 8	VAL; FEA; 1	VAL; SPR; Ret	SIL; FEA; 1	SIL; SPR; 4	HOC; FEA; 10	HOC; SPR; 5	HUN; FEA; 8	HUN; SPR; 1	SPA; FEA; 11	SPA; SPR; 13	MNZ; FEA; 9	MNZ; SPR; Ret	MRN; FEA; 2	MRN; SPR; 6	**3rd**	**176**

^{†} Gutiérrez did not finish the race, but was classified as he had completed over 90% of the race distance.

==== Complete GP2 Asia Series results ====
(key) (Races in bold indicate pole position; races in italics indicate fastest lap)

Year	Entrant	1	2	3	4	DC	Points
2011	Lotus ART	YMC; FEA; Ret	YMC; SPR; 12	IMO; FEA; 12	IMO; SPR; 4	11th	3

==== Complete GP2 Final results ====
(key) (Races in bold indicate pole position) (Races in italics indicate fastest lap)

Year	Entrant	1	2	DC	Points
2011	Lotus ART	YMC; FEA; 21	YMC; SPR; 5	8th	2

=== Complete Formula One results ===
(key) (Races in bold indicate pole position; races in italics indicate fastest lap)

Year	Entrant	Chassis	Engine	1	2	3	4	5	6	7	8	9	10	11	12	13	14	15	16	17	18	19	20	21	WDC	Points
2012	Sauber F1 Team	Sauber C31	Ferrari 056 2.4 V8	AUS	MAL	CHN	BHR	ESP	MON	CAN	EUR	GBR	GER	HUN	BEL	ITA	SIN	JPN	KOR	IND; TD	ABU	USA	BRA		–	–
2013	Sauber F1 Team	Sauber C32	Ferrari 056 2.4 V8	AUS; 13	MAL; 12	CHN; Ret	BHR; 18	ESP; 11	MON; 13	CAN; 20†	GBR; 14	GER; 14	HUN; Ret	BEL; 14	ITA; 13	SIN; 12	KOR; 11	JPN; 7	IND; 15	ABU; 13	USA; 13	BRA; 12			16th	6
2014	Sauber F1 Team	Sauber C33	Ferrari 059/3 1.6 V6 t	AUS; 12	MAL; Ret	BHR; Ret	CHN; 16	ESP; 16	MON; Ret	CAN; 14†	AUT; 19	GBR; Ret	GER; 14	HUN; Ret	BEL; 15	ITA; 20	SIN; Ret	JPN; 13	RUS; 15	USA; 14	BRA; 14	ABU; 15			20th	0
2016	Haas F1 Team	Haas VF-16	Ferrari 061 1.6 V6 t	AUS; Ret	BHR; Ret	CHN; 14	RUS; 17	ESP; 11	MON; 11	CAN; 13	EUR; 16	AUT; 11	GBR; 16	HUN; 13	GER; 11	BEL; 12	ITA; 13	SIN; 11	MAL; Ret	JPN; 20	USA; Ret	MEX; 19	BRA; Ret	ABU; 12	21st	0

^{†} Driver did not finish the Grand Prix, but was classified as he completed over 90% of the race distance.

=== Complete Formula E results ===
(key) (Races in bold indicate pole position; races in italics indicate fastest lap)

Year	Team	Chassis	Powertrain	1	2	3	4	5	6	7	8	9	10	11	12	Pos	Points
2016–17	Techeetah	Spark SRT01-e	Renault Z.E. 16	HKG	MRK	BUE	MEX; 10	MCO; 8	PAR; 11	BER	BER	NYC	NYC	MTL	MTL	22nd	5

=== American open-wheel racing ===
==== IndyCar Series ====
(key) (Races in bold indicate pole position; races in italics indicate fastest lap)

Year	Team	No.	Chassis	Engine	1	2	3	4	5	6	7	8	9	10	11	12	13	14	15	16	17	Rank	Points
2017	Dale Coyne Racing	18	Dallara DW12	Honda	STP	LBH	ALA	PHX	IMS	INDY	DET; 19	DET; 14	TXS	RDA; 17	IOW; 13	TOR; 14	MDO; 20	POC; 22	GTW	WGL	SNM	25th	91

=== Complete 24 Hours of Le Mans results ===
Year	Team	Co-Drivers	Car	Class	Laps	Pos.	Class Pos.
2022	(Poland) Inter Europol Competition	(United Kingdom) Alex Brundle (Poland) Jakub Śmiechowski	Oreca 07-Gibson	LMP2	365	17th	13th
2023	(United States) Glickenhaus Racing	(France) Nathanaël Berthon (France) Franck Mailleux	Glickenhaus SCG 007 LMH	Hypercar	333	7th	7th

=== Complete FIA World Endurance Championship results ===
(Races in bold indicate pole position; results in italics indicate fastest lap)

Year	Entrant	Class	Chassis	Engine	1	2	3	4	5	6	Rank	Points
2022	Inter Europol Competition	LMP2	Oreca 07	Gibson GK428 4.2 L V8	SEB; 14	SPA; Ret	LMS; 8	MNZ; 4	FUJ; 11	BHR; NC	15th	20

=== Complete IMSA SportsCar Championship results ===
(key) (Races in bold indicate pole position; results in italics indicate fastest lap)

Year	Team	Class	Make	Engine	1	2	3	4	5	6	7	Pos.	Points	Ref
2023	CrowdStrike Racing by APR	LMP2	Oreca 07	Gibson GK428 V8	DAY; 2†	SEB	LGA	WGL	ELK	IMS	PET	NC†	0†	

^{†} Points only counted towards the Michelin Endurance Cup, and not the overall LMP2 Championship. ^{*} Season still in progress.

=== Formula One achievements ===
- Seventh on the list of Youngest race leaders.
- Fifth on the list of Youngest drivers to set a fastest lap.

Sporting positions
Preceded by Inaugural	Formula BMW Europe; Champion; 2008	Succeeded by Felipe Nasr
Preceded by Inaugural	GP3 Series; Champion; 2010	Succeeded by Valtteri Bottas
Awards and achievements
Preceded by Inaugural	Pirelli Trophy for Tyre Management; Champion; 2012	Succeeded by Sam Bird
