= Daniel Morad =

Canadian racing driver

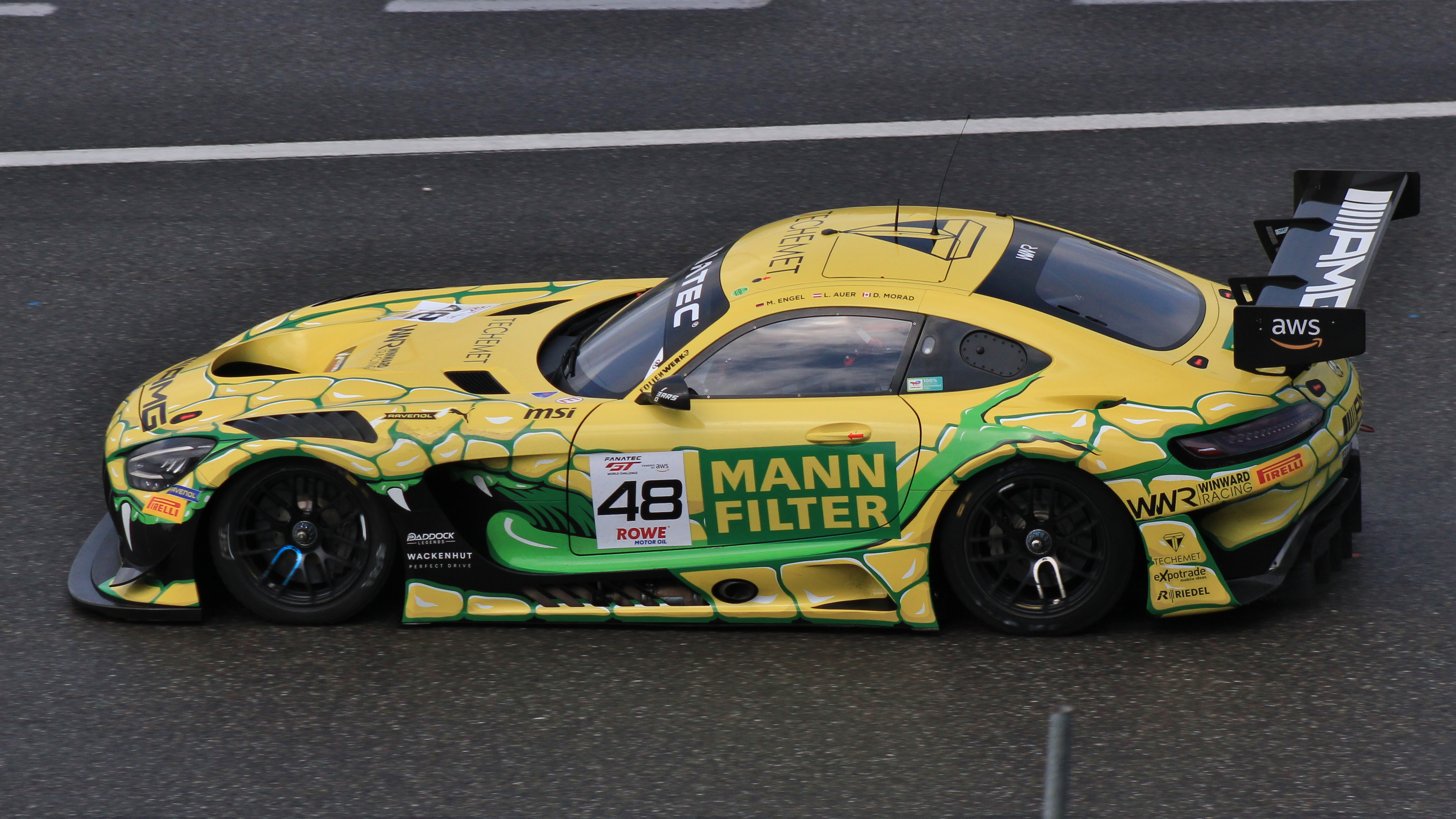
- Nationality: (Canada) Canadian
- Born: April 24, 1990 (age 36) Markham, Canada

Pirelli World Challenge career
- Debut season: 2017
- Categorisation: FIA Silver (until 2022); FIA Gold (2023–)
- Car number: 2
- Starts: 26
- Wins: 4
- Poles: 3
- Fastest laps: 2
- Best finish: 1st in 2017/2018

Previous series
- 2008–2009 2008 2006–2007: A1GP; Atlantic Championship; Formula BMW USA

Championship titles
- 2007: Formula BMW USA

Daniel Morad (born April 24, 1990) is a Canadian racecar driver and YouTuber, races in IMSA for Winward Racing in a Mercedes AMG GT3 in the GTD Class. He is notable for winning the 2007 American Formula BMW championship; the 2010 World Championship in the Rotax Max Challenge Grand Finals in La Conca, Italy; the 2016 Ultra 94 Porsche GT3 Cup Platinum Cup; and the 2017 & 2024 Rolex 24 Hours of Daytona with Alegra Motorsports and Winward Racing

== Career ==
=== Karting and Formula BMW ===
Morad was born in Markham, Ontario, Canada. His career began in his native country during 1998 competing in several karting events. In his eight-year career in karts, Morad picked up a number of trophies, including the Canadian Formula Senior Championship and a Florida Winter Tour champion title, in the Pro-Shifter class. He later went on to partake in the Rotax Max Challenge Grand Finals 2010, where he qualified 13th in the Pre-final and went up to win the final.

Morad moved up into Formula racing in 2006, in the form of Formula BMW, competing in its American series. In his début season, in which he participated in all fourteen rounds, he picked up a win in Mid-Ohio, a pole position, a fastest lap and a podium at the Lime Rock Park meeting. With a collection of 75 points, Morad finished sixth overall in the Drivers' Championship.

Morad switched teams the following year, joining the Italian EuroInternational. He won the title that year, taking six wins of a possible fourteen and scoring 523 points, more than the previous year albeit with a more generous points system than the previous year, nearly one-hundred points clear of runner-up Mexican Esteban Gutiérrez. 2007 also saw Morad drive for the Canadian A1 Grand Prix team taking the role of test driver at the South African, Mexican, Chinese and British meetings.

=== Atlantic Championship ===
With his Formula BMW USA title on his résumé, Morad managed to get a drive at the EuroInternational Atlantic Championship team alongside Venezuelan Luis Schiavo. He finished twelfth in the championship after leaving the team and the series with three races remaining in the season. He was tenth at the time. His best finish was sixth at Long Beach and the Grand Prix de Trois-Rivières.

=== A1 Grand Prix – The World Cup of Motorsport ===
Morad raced for A1 Team Lebanon in the 2008–09 season. Although having previously driven in rookie sessions for A1 Team Canada, his grandfather was Lebanese and his father also was born in Lebanon so he was able to switch teams. He completed every race for the team and scored eight points, putting A1 Team Lebanon in seventeenth overall. Morad's best finish was sixth in the South African feature race.

=== GP3 Series ===
With A1GP's closing at the end of the season, Morad did not drive in any other series in 2009 but joined Status Grand Prix in the GP3 Series for 2010. He finished twelfth in the GP3 series standings, and won the Silverstone sprint race. After sitting out the first round of the 2011 GP3 Series season, Daniel Morad signed on to contest the remainder of the season with Carlin Motorsport. However, Morad parted ways with the team in July and was replaced by Callum MacLeod.

=== Indy Lights ===
Morad raced in the 2011 Firestone Indy Lights series with Team Moore Racing for one event in Edmonton.

=== Ultra 94 Porsche GT3 Cup Challenge Canada by Yokohama ===
Morad was given a second chance at a career when a cold call to the Alegra Motorsports team landed him a spot in the team's line up, just one week before the opening race at Canadian Tire Motorsport Park. He scored an impressive double podium in his first race with a roof over his head. He went on to scoring a total of nine podiums in ten races, one of which being a dominant win on the streets of Toronto in torrential conditions. One DNF in Round 3 of the championship ultimately cost him the title in his debut season. Morad's efforts were enough to land him an opportunity to participate in the exclusive Porsche Young Drivers Academy.

Morad bounced back to win the 2016 Platinum class championship despite strong challenges from Scott Hargrove and Zacharie Robichon.

=== Porsche Carrera Cup Great Britain ===
At the end of his 2015 campaign, Morad got a call from championship winning team, Samsung SUHD TV Racing, to sub in for the final four rounds of the championship, which helped the team jump from third to second place in the team championship.

=== NASCAR ===
Morad competed in two NASCAR Pinty's Series events in 2016. He made his debut at Toronto driving the No. 06 Dodge, he started third and finished seventh after leading five laps. Morad returned at Circuit Trois-Rivières, where he finished fifth.

=== IMSA WeatherTech SportsCar Championship ===
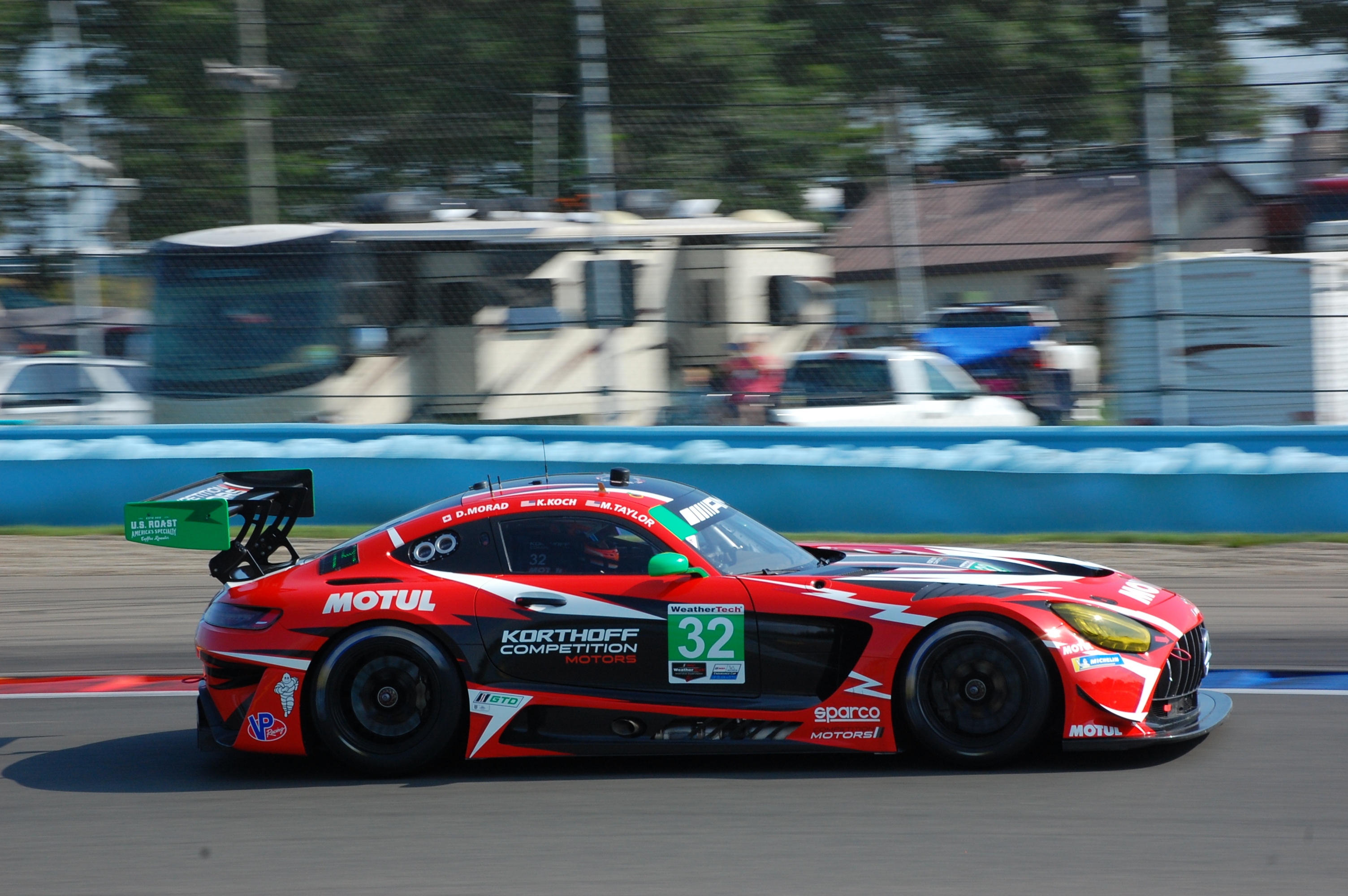
Morad at Watkins Glen in 2025

In 2016, Morad competed in the 12 Hours of Sebring driving the No. 24 Alegra Motorsports InSync Riley/BMW Daytona Prototype. He brought the team up to third place overall, just past the halfway point of the race in difficult conditions. Unfortunately, shortly after Morad jumped out of the car, the team ran into some trouble on track with slower traffic and then some electrical issues.

In 2017, Morad competed full time in the IMSA WeatherTech SportsCar Championship with Alegra Motorsport driving the No. 28 Porsche 991 GT3 R. He won the Rolex 24 at Daytona in the GTD category for Alegra Motorsports together with Carlos de Quesada, Jesse Lazare, Michael de Quesada and Michael Christensen and finished 9th in the GTD drivers Championship.

In 2018, Morad drove two IMSA WeatherTech SportsCar Championship races with two different teams. He competed in the 2018 Sahlen's six hours of the Glen driving the No. 71 Mercedes-AMG GT3 for P1 Motorsports with Loris Spinelli and JC Perez. They retired after 48 laps. He also drove the No. 29 Audi R8 LMS with Kelvin van der Linde and Christopher Mies for Montaplast by Land Motorsport at the 2018 Petit le mans, finishing the race 26th overall and sixth in class.

In 2019, Morad competed in the Michelin Endurance Cup with Montaplast by Land Motorsport scoring a best finish of nineteenth overall and second in class at the 2019 Petit le mans.

In 2020, Morad competed in the Rolex 24 at Daytona for WRT Speedstar Audi Sport driving the No. 88 Audi R8 LMS GT3 with Rolf Ineichen, Mirko Bortolotti and Dries Vanthoor. They ended up finishing twentieth overall and third in class.

For the 2023 24 Hours of Daytona, Morad was drafted in to replace Lucas Auer for Winward Racing after Auer suffered a back injury in a practice crash.

== Personal life ==
Morad was born in the spring of 1990 in Ontario to Robin and Ramsin Morad. He has one sister, Kayla.

== Racing record ==
=== Racing career summary ===
Season	Series	Team	Races	Wins	Poles	F/Laps	Podiums	Points	Position
2006	Bridgestone Racing Academy - F2000	Ultra 94	7	7	7	7	7	195	**1st**
2006	Formula BMW USA	AIM Autosport	14	1	1	1	2	72	6th
2006	Formula BMW World Final	AIM Autosport	1	0	0	0	0	N/A	4th
2007	Formula BMW USA	EuroInternational	14	6	3	6	10	524	**1st**
2007	Formula BMW World Final	EuroInternational	1	0	0	0	0	N/A	DNF
2008	Atlantic Championship	EuroInternational	8	0	0	0	0	95	12th
2008–09	A1 Grand Prix	A1 Team Lebanon	14	0	0	0	0	8	17th
2010	GP3 Series	Status Grand Prix	16	1	0	1	1	15	12th
2011	GP3 Series	Carlin	4	0	0	0	0	0	33rd
2011	Indy Lights	Team Moore Racing	2	0	0	0	0	34	26th
2015	Porsche GT3 Cup Challenge Canada - Platinum	Alegra Motorsports	10	1	0	1	9	165	**2nd**
2015	Porsche Carrera Cup Great Britain	Samsung SUHD TV Racing	4	0	0	0	0	27	18th
2016	NASCAR Pinty's Series	Carlos de Quesada	2	0	0	0	0	77	30th
2016	Porsche GT3 Cup Challenge Canada - Platinum	Porsche Centre Oakville / Alegra Motorsports	12	5	6	1	10	205	**1st**
2016	Porsche GT3 Cup Challenge USA - Platinum	Alegra Motorsports	4	1	3	3	4	72	12th
2016	IMSA SportsCar Championship - Prototype	Alegra Motorsports	1	0	0	0	0	21	35th
2017	Pirelli World Challenge - GT	CRP Racing	10	2	0	0	3	172	13th
2017	IMSA SportsCar Championship - GTD	Alegra Motorsports	12	1	0	0	3	281	8th
2018	Pirelli World Challenge - GT	CRP Racing	15	1	3	2	4	237	6th
2018	IMSA Prototype Challenge - LMP3	Extreme Speed Motorsports	1	0	0	1	1	30	35th
2018	IMSA SportsCar Championship - GTD	P1 Motorsports	1	0	0	0	0	40	43rd
2018	IMSA SportsCar Championship - GTD	Montaplast by Land-Motorsport	1	0	0	0	0	40	43rd
2019	Blancpain GT World Challenge America	Alegra Motorsports	10	0	0	0	0	62	12th
2019	IMSA SportsCar Championship - GT	Montaplast by Land-Motorsport	4	0	0	0	1	92	28th
2020	IMSA SportsCar Championship - GTD	WRT Speedstar Audi Sport	1	0	0	1	1	51	34th
2020	IMSA SportsCar Championship - GTD	AIM Vasser Sullivan	1	0	0	0	0	51	34th
2021	IMSA SportsCar Championship - GTD	Alegra Motorsports	9	0	0	1	0	1515	16th
2022	GT World Challenge Europe Endurance Cup	Al Manar Racing by HRT	1	0	0	0	0	0	NC
2022	Intercontinental GT Challenge	Al Manar Racing by HRT	1	0	0	0	0	25	11th
2022	Intercontinental GT Challenge	Mercedes-AMG Team Craft-Bamboo Racing	1	1	0	0	1	25	11th
2022	IMSA SportsCar Championship - GTD	Alegra Motorsports	4	0	0	0	0	620	36th
2023	GT World Challenge America - Pro/Am	TR3 Racing	8	0	0	2	1	62	11th
2023	GT World Challenge America - Pro	TR3 Racing	2	2	1	0	2	50	7th
2023	IMSA SportsCar Championship - GTD	Winward Racing	1	0	0	0	0	189	61st
2023	Michelin Pilot Challenge - GS	Winward Racing	10	2	0	0	3	1770	14th
2024	GT World Challenge Europe Endurance Cup	Mercedes-AMG Team Mann-Filter	5	1	0	1	2	48	6th
2024	Michelin Pilot Challenge - GS	Winward Racing	9	0	0	1	3	1930	12th
2024	IMSA SportsCar Championship - GTD	Winward Racing	1	1	0	0	1	364	47th
2024	GT World Challenge Asia	Craft-Bamboo Racing	6	0	0	0	2	43	15th
2025	IMSA SportsCar Championship - GTD	Korthoff Competition Motors	2	0	0	0	1	560	42nd
2025	Michelin Pilot Challenge - GS	Winward Racing	6	0	0	2	1	1190	22nd
2025	GT World Challenge Asia	Craft-Bamboo Racing	2	0	0	0	0	18	28th
2026	GT World Challenge America - Pro-Am	TR3 Racing	6	1	0	0	1	48	8th
2026	Lamborghini Super Trofeo North America - Pro	TR3 Racing	2	2	2	2	2	32	15th

^{*} Season still in progress.

=== Complete GP3 Series results ===
(key) (Races in bold indicate pole position) (Races in italics indicate fastest lap)

Year	Entrant	1	2	3	4	5	6	7	8	9	10	11	12	13	14	15	16	DC	Points
2010	Status Grand Prix	CAT; FEA; Ret	CAT; SPR; 22	IST; FEA; 5	IST; SPR; 5	VAL; FEA; 19	VAL; SPR; 12	SIL; FEA; 7	SIL; SPR; 1	HOC; FEA; Ret	HOC; SPR; 9	HUN; FEA; 22	HUN; SPR; 12	SPA; FEA; Ret	SPA; SPR; 16	MNZ; FEA; 9	MNZ; SPR; 7	12th	15
2011	Carlin	IST; FEA	IST; SPR	CAT; FEA; 24	CAT; SPR; 14	VAL; FEA; 15	VAL; SPR; Ret	SIL; FEA; DNS	SIL; SPR; DNS	NÜR; FEA	NÜR; SPR	HUN; FEA	HUN; SPR	SPA; FEA	SPA; SPR	MNZ; FEA	MNZ; SPR	33rd	0

=== Complete Indy Lights results ===
Year	Team	1	2	3	4	5	6	7	8	9	10	11	12	13	14	Rank	Points
2011	Team Moore Racing	STP	ALA	LBH	INDY	MIL	IOW	TOR	EDM; 15	EDM; 11	TRO	NHM	BAL	KTY	LVS	26th	34

=== Complete WeatherTech SportsCar Championship results ===
(key) (Races in bold indicate pole position; results in italics indicate fastest lap)

Year	Team	Class	Make	Engine	1	2	3	4	5	6	7	8	9	10	11	12	Pos.	Points
2016	Alegra Motorsports	P	Riley Mk XXVI DP	Dinan (BMW) 5.0 L V8	DAY	SEB; 11	LBH	LGA	BEL	WGL	MOS	ELK	COA	PET			35th	21
2017	Alegra Motorsports	GTD	Porsche 911 GT3 R	Porsche 4.0 L Flat-6	DAY; 1	SEB; 10	LBH; 12	**AUS**; 7	BEL; 10	WGL; 7	MOS; 15	LIM; 3	ELK; 11	VIR; 9	LGA; 16	PET; 2	8th	281
2018	P1 Motorsports	GTD	Mercedes-AMG GT3	Mercedes-AMG M159 6.2 L V8	DAY	SEB	MOH	BEL	WGL; 12	MOS	LIM	ELK	VIR	LGA			43rd	40
2018	Montaplast by Land-Motorsport	GTD	Audi R8 LMS	Audi DAR 5.2 L V10											PET; 6		43rd	40
2019	Montaplast by Land-Motorsport	GTD	Audi R8 LMS Evo	Audi DAR 5.2 L V10	DAY; 22	SEB; 4	MOH	DET	WGL; 8	MOS	LIM	ELK	VIR	LGA	PET; 2		28th	92
2020	WRT Speedstar Audi Sport	GTD	Audi R8 LMS Evo	Audi DAR 5.2 L V10	DAY; 3	DAY	SEB	ELK	VIR								34th	51
2020	AIM Vasser Sullivan	GTD	Lexus RC F GT3	Toyota 2UR-GSE 5.0 L V8						ATL; 10	MOH	CLT	PET	LGA	SEB		34th	51
2021	Alegra Motorsports	GTD	Mercedes-AMG GT3 Evo	Mercedes-AMG M159 6.2 L V8	DAY; 9	SEB; 12	MOH; 10	DET; 10	WGL; 5	WGL; 5	LIM	ELK	LGA	LBH	VIR; 8	PET; 4	16th	1515
2022	Alegra Motorsports	GTD	Mercedes-AMG GT3 Evo	Mercedes-AMG M159 6.2 L V8	DAY; 20	SEB; 9	LBH	LGA; 9	MOH	DET	WGL	MOS	LIM	ELK	VIR	PET	36th	620
2023	Winward Racing	GTD	Mercedes-AMG GT3 Evo	Mercedes-AMG M159 6.2 L V8	DAY; 13	SEB	LBH	LGA	WGL	MOS	LIM	ELK	VIR	IMS	PET		61st	189
2024	Winward Racing	GTD	Mercedes-AMG GT3 Evo	Mercedes-AMG M159 6.2 L V8	DAY; 1	SEB	LBH	LGA	WGL	MOS	ELK	VIR	IMS	PET			47th	364
2025	Korthoff Competition Motors	GTD	Mercedes-AMG GT3 Evo	Mercedes-AMG M159 6.2 L V8	DAY; 9	SEB	LBH	LGA	WGL; 3	MOS	ELK	VIR	IMS	PET			42nd	560

Sporting positions
Preceded by Robert Wickens	Formula BMW USA; Champion; 2007	Succeeded by Alexander Rossi (Formula BMW Americas)
