= Afiq Yazid =

Malaysian racing driver (born 1991)

- Nationality: (Malaysia) Malaysian
- Born: Mohamad Afiq Ikhwan bin Mohamad Yazid; 8 August 1991 (age 35) Kuala Lumpur, Malaysia
- Categorisation: FIA Silver

Championship titles
- 2025 2019 2015–2017: TSS The Super Series – GTM; Lamborghini Super Trofeo Asia – Pro-Am; Lamborghini Super Trofeo Asia – Pro

Mohamad Afiq Ikhwan bin Mohamad Yazid (born 8 August 1991) is a Malaysian racing driver who competes in the GTM class of TSS The Super Series for PSC Motorsport.

== Career ==
Afiq began karting in 2007, competing until 2010. During his karting career, Afiq most notably won the Rotax Max Challenge Asia title in the Senior Max category in his final year of karting. During 2010, Afiq also made his single-seater debut for Meritus in Formula BMW Pacific, scoring a lone overall podium at Guangdong to end the season sixth in points.

The following year, Afiq returned to Meritus for his second season in the newly-renamed JK Racing Asia Series. Starting the season with four podiums between the two Sepang rounds, Afiq then won all four races at Sentul, both races in Singapore and all four races at the Sepang finale to secure runner-up honours, seven poinits behind Lucas Auer. In 2012, Afiq continued with Meritus for his third season in the JK Racing Asia Series, scoring four wins and three podiums to end the year third overall. In parallel, Afiq raced on a part-time basis in Formula Pilota China with the same team, taking a lone podium at the Sepang finale.

Remaining with Meritus for 2013, Afiq made the full-time switch to Formula Masters China, as part of the Petronas Talent Development Programme. Kicking off the season with a win at Zhuhai, Afiq won twice at Shanghai and both Ordos races, before taking six other podiums and a win at the Shanghai finale, but lost the title by two points to Aidan Wright. During 2013, Afiq also made his sportscar debut, competing part-time in the Pro-Am class of Lamborghini Super Trofeo Asia, taking four wins and also finishing runner-up in points. After another season in Super Trofeo Asia's Pro-Am class, Afiq switched to the Pro class for 2015, securing the title with seven wins to his name. During 2015, Afiq also won the Sepang 12 Hours in the GTC Pro-Am class for Topspeed Racing.

In early 2016, Afiq made his Asian Le Mans Series debut for Audi-fielding ARC Bratislava in the GT class at the 3 Hours of Sepang. Returning to Super Trofeo Asia for the rest of the year, this time as a member of Lamborghini's Young Drivers Program, Afiq took eight wins to secure his second consecutive Pro class title with a round to spare for Lamborghini Osaka. Switching to Clazzio Racing for 2017, Afiq won eight races and secured his third consecutive Pro title at Imola alongside Kei Cozzolino.

At the beginning of 2018, Afiq joined Jackie Chan DC Racing X Jota's LMP2 squad to race in the final two rounds of the 2017–18 Asian Le Mans Series, during which he won on debut at the 6 Hours of Buriram. Following that, Afiq was set to drive in the 2018–19 FIA World Endurance Championship, sharing the team's all-Malaysian #37 entry with Jazeman Jaafar, Weiron Tan and Nabil Jeffri, but did not make any appearances. Returning to Lamborghini Super Trofeo Asia and Clazzio for the rest of 2018, Afiq took five wins to end the season fifth in the Pro standings, before ending the year by finishing second in the Super Trofeo World Finals. Switching to Hojust Racing and the Pro-Am class for 2019, Afiq won seven times and took four more podiums to clinch the class title.

In 2020, Afiq was set to join Lamborghini outfit Vincenzo Sospiri Racing to compete in GT World Challenge Asia alongside Frederik Schandorff, but those plans fell through when the season was cancelled due to COVID-19. Two years later, Afiq made his return to racing in Thailand's TSS The Super Series, racing a Lamborghini Huracán Super Trofeo Evo in the GTM class for PSC Motorsport. Remaining in the series for the next two seasons, Afiq scored a pair of wins, before clinching the GTM class title with seven wins to his name in 2025 aboard a Ferrari 296 Challenge. During 2025, Afiq raced at the 24 Hours of Barcelona for Mercedes-aligned Viper Niza Racing to help the team end the year fourth in the 24H Series GT3 Am standings.

In 2026, Afiq was set to drive for Corvette-affiliated Johor Motorsports Racing JMR at the IGTC's 24 Hours of Spa and the 24 Hours of Le Mans, but was replaced at the beginning of June by Jordan Love (for Spa) and Lorcan Hanafin (for Le Mans). Elsewhere, Afiq continued with PSC Motorsport to defend his GTM title in TSS The Super Series.

== Karting record ==
=== Karting career summary ===
Season	Series	Team	Position
2007	RMC Grand Finals — Rotax Junior		70th
2008	Rotax Max Challenge Asia — Senior Max	KRS Motorsports	3rd
2008	Rotax Max Challenge Malaysia — Senior Max		3rd
2009	Rotax Max Challenge Asia — Senior Max	KRS Motorsports	7th
2009	Rotax Max Challenge Malaysia — Senior Max	KRS Motorsports	5th
2010	Rotax Max Challenge Asia — Senior Max		1st
2010	RMC Grand Finals — 125 Senior		DNQ

== Racing record ==
=== Racing career summary ===
Season	Series	Team	Races	Wins	Poles	F/Laps	Podiums	Points	Position
2010	Formula BMW Pacific	Meritus	14	0	0	0	1	74	6th
2011	JK Racing Asia Series	www.Meritus.GP	18	10	6	7	15	285	**2nd**
2012	Formula Pilota China	Mahara	9	0	0	0	1	50	8th
2012	JK Racing Asia Series	www.Meritus.GP	16	4	5	1	7	174	**3rd**
2013	Formula Masters China	Meritus.GP	18	6	2	5	13	208	**2nd**
2013	Lamborghini Super Trofeo Asia – Pro-Am	Meritus.GP	8	4	0	1	6		**2nd**
2014	Lamborghini Super Trofeo Asia – Pro-Am	Aylezo	8	0	2	2	6		
2015	Lamborghini Super Trofeo Asia – Pro-Am	Starspeed - Hong Kong	2	1	0	0	1		
2015	Lamborghini Super Trofeo Asia – Pro	Starspeed - Hong Kong	9	7	4	1	8		**1st**
2015	Sepang 12 Hours – GTC Pro-Am	Topspeed Racing	1	1	0	0	1	—N/a	**1st**
2015–16	Asian Le Mans Series – GT	ARC Bratislava	1	0	0	0	0	3	24th
2016	Lamborghini Super Trofeo Asia – Pro	Lamborghini Osaka	10	8	3	7	10	144	**1st**
2016	Lamborghini Super Trofeo World Finals – Pro-Am	Aran Racing	2	0	1	0	0	12	5th
2017	Lamborghini Super Trofeo Asia – Pro	Clazzio Racing	12	10	12	9	12	186	**1st**
2017	Lamborghini Super Trofeo World Finals – Pro	Clazzio Racing	2	0	0	0	0		
2017	Super Taikyu – ST-X	CarGuy Racing	4	0	0	0	0	32‡	8th‡
2017–18	Asian Le Mans Series – LMP2	Jackie Chan DC Racing X Jota	2	0	0	0	1	35	5th
2018	Lamborghini Super Trofeo Asia – Pro	Clazzio Racing	8	5	2	2	7	110	4th
2018	Lamborghini Super Trofeo World Finals – Pro	Clazzio Racing	2	1	0	0	1	17	**2nd**
2018	Super Taikyu – ST-X	CarGuy Racing	1	0	0	0	0	7‡	10th‡
2018	Gulf 12 Hours – GT Cup	PSC Motorsport	1	0	0	0	0	—N/a	4th
2019	Lamborghini Super Trofeo Asia – Pro-Am	Hojust Racing	12	7	5	3	11	139	**1st**
2019	Lamborghini Super Trofeo World Finals – Pro-Am	Hojust Racing	2	0	1	0	1	13	4th
2019	Sepang 1000km – Class M	Honda Malaysia Racing Team	1	0	0	0	0	—N/a	6th
2022	TSS The Super Series – GTM	PSC Motorsport	8	0			1	80	4th
2022	Malaysia Championship Series – SP1	Empire Motorsports	6	0	0	0	0	4	10th
2023	TSS The Super Series – GTM	PSC Motorsport	8	1			3	78	5th
2023	Sepang 12 Hours	R&B Racing	1	0	0	0	0	—N/a	4th
2024	TSS The Super Series – GTM	PSC Motorsport	10	1			5	130	4th
2025	TSS The Super Series – GTM	PSC Motorsport	8	7	0	0	8	190	**1st**
2025	24H Series – GT3 Am	Viper Niza Racing	1	0	0	0	0	34	NC
2026	TSS The Super Series – GTM	PSC Motorsport	2	2	2	0	2	50*	**1st***

^{‡} Team standings.

=== Complete JK Racing Asia Series results ===
(key) (Races in bold indicate pole position; races in italics indicate fastest lap.)

Year	Team	1	2	3	4	5	6	7	8	9	10	11	12	13	14	15	16	17	18	DC	Points
2010	Meritus	SEP1; 1; 8	SEP1; 2 Ret	SEP2; 1 Ret	SEP2; 2 Ret	SEP2; 3; 15	SEP2; 4; 12	GUA; 1; 6	GUA; 2; 3	GUA; 3 Ret	GUA; 4; 6	SIN; 1; 4	SIN; 2; 6	OKA; 1; 4	OKA; 2; 6	MAC				6th	74
2011	www.Meritus.GP	SEP1; 1; 2	SEP1; 2; 2	SEP2; 1; 3	SEP2; 2 Ret	SEP2; 3; 3	SEP2; 4; 6	**SEN**; **1**; 1	**SEN**; **2**; 1	SEN; 3; 1	SEN; 4; 1	**SIN**; **1**; 1	**SIN**; **2**; 1	IND; 1; 10	IND; 2; 2	**SEP3**; **1**; 1	**SEP3**; **2**; 1	SEP3; 3; 1	SEP3; 4; 1	2nd	285
2012	www.Meritus.GP	SEP; 1; 2	SEP; 2 Ret	SEP; 3; 4	SEP; 4; 11	**LEC**; **1**; 9	LEC; 2; 1	SPA; 1 Ret	SPA; 2; 6	**SIL**; **1**; 1	**SIL**; **2**; 1	**IND1**; **1**; 1	IND1; 2; 4	IND2; 1; 3	IND2; 2; 2	IND2; 3; 6	IND2; 4 Ret			3rd	174

=== Complete Formula Masters China results ===
(key) (Races in bold indicate pole position) (Races in italics indicate fastest lap)

Year	Entrant	1	2	3	4	5	6	7	8	9	10	11	12	13	14	15	16	17	18	DC	Points
2012	Mahara	SHI; 1; 9	SHI; 2; 11	SHI; 3; 6	ORD1; 1	ORD1; 2	ORD1; 3	ORD2; 1	ORD2; 2	ORD2; 3	GUA; 1	GUA; 2	GUA; 3	SEP1; 1; 4	SEP1; 2; 6	SEP1; 3; 5	SEP2; 1; 6	SEP2; 2; 4	SEP2; 3; 3	8th	50
2013	Meritus.GP	ZHU; 1; 1	ZHU; 2; 5	**ZHU**; **3** Ret	**SHI1**; **1**; 1	SHI1; 2; 1	SHI1; 3; 2	ORD; 1; 1	**ORD**; **2**; 1	INJ; 1; 2	INJ; 2; 13	INJ; 3; 4	INJ; 4; 3	SEP; 1; 2	SEP; 2; 2	SEP; 3 Ret	SHI2; 1; 2	**SHI2**; **2**; 1	SHI2; 3; 3	2nd	208

=== Complete Asian Le Mans Series results ===
(key) (Races in bold indicate pole position) (Races in italics indicate fastest lap)

Year	Team	Class	Car	Engine	1	2	3	4	Pos.	Points
2015–16	ARC Bratislava	GT	Audi R8 LMS ultra	Audi DAR 5.2 L V10	FUJ	SEP	BUR	SEP; 8	24th	3
2017–18	Jackie Chan DC Racing X Jota	LMP2	Oreca 05	Nissan VK45DE 4.5 L V8	ZHU	FUJ	BUR; 1	SEP; 5	5th	35
