= Nabil Jeffri =

Malaysian racing driver (born 1993)

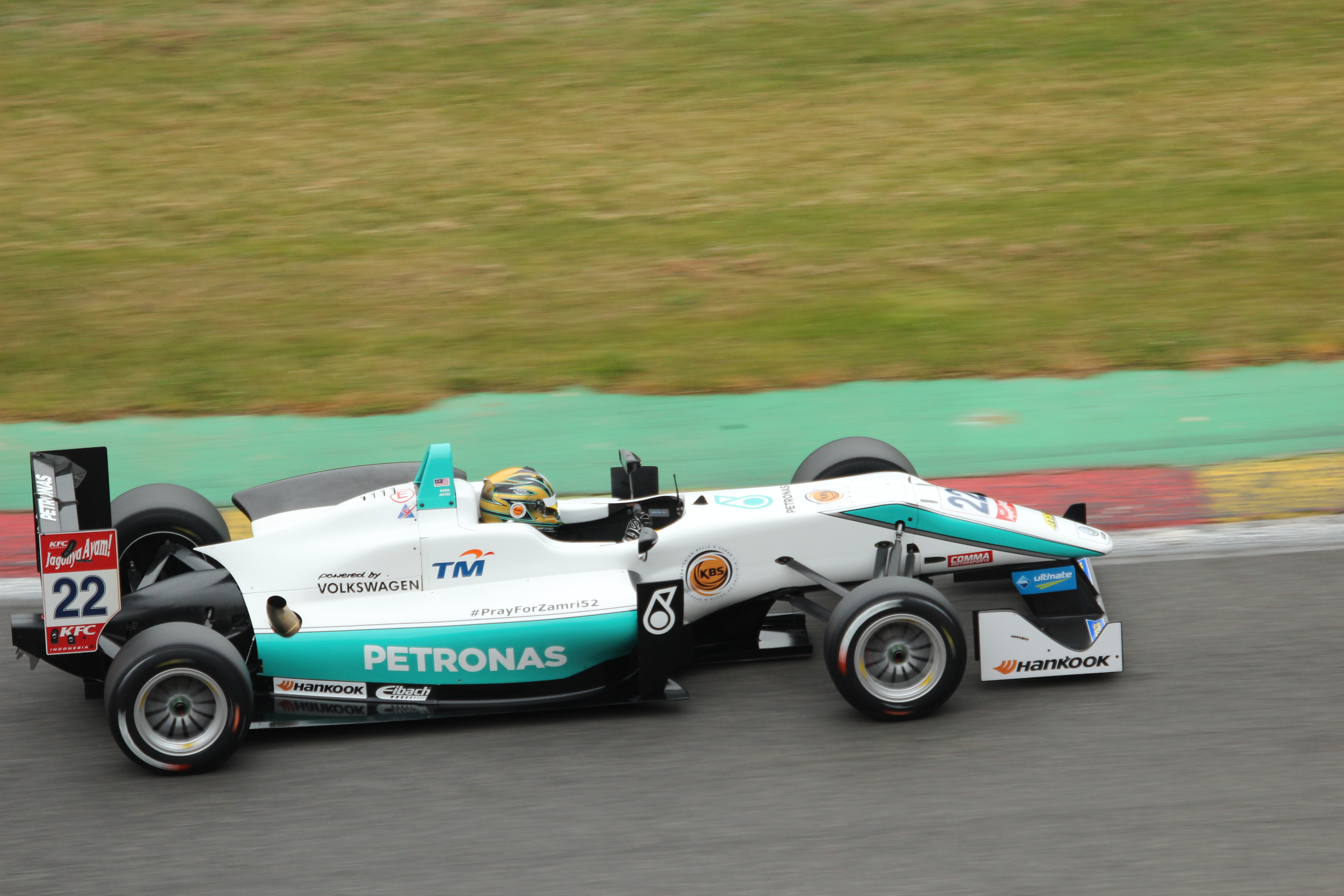
- Jeffri in 2015
- Nationality: (Malaysia) Malaysian
- Born: Muhammad Nabil Jan Al bin Jeffri; 24 October 1993 (age 33) Kuala Lumpur, Malaysia

FIA Formula 2 Championship career
- Debut season: 2017
- Current team: Trident
- Categorisation: FIA Silver
- Car number: 16
- Starts: 22
- Wins: 0
- Podiums: 0
- Poles: 0
- Fastest laps: 0
- Best finish: 23rd in 2017

Previous series
- 2016 2015 2013–2014 2011–2012 2010: GP2 Series; FIA Formula 3 European Championship; German Formula Three; JK Racing Asia Series; Formula BMW Pacific

Muhammad Nabil Jan Al bin Jeffri (born 24 October 1993, in Kuala Lumpur) is a Malaysian former racing driver.

== Career ==
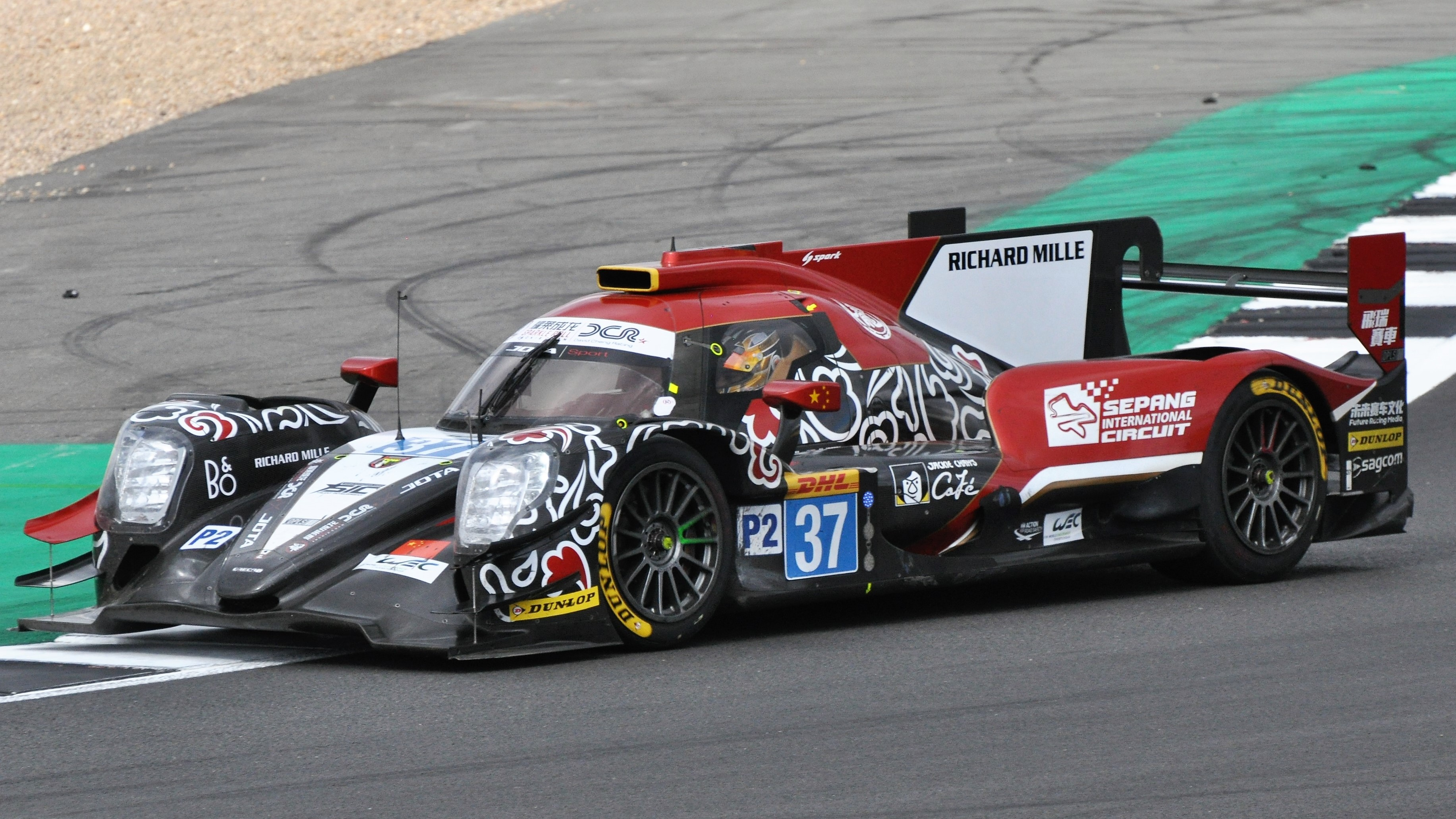
Jeffri driving in the 2018 6 Hours of Silverstone.

Jeffri began his career in karting winning the Asian and Malaysian Rotax Max Junior titles in 2009. He stepped up to Formula BMW Pacific in 2010, racing for Eurasia Motorsport. On 1 September 2010, Jeffri carried out an aerodynamic test for the Lotus Racing Formula One team, driving the Lotus T127 on the airfield at the Imperial War Museum Duxford, becoming the youngest ever test driver in Formula One history. He drove for the team as a member of the AirAsia ASEAN Driver Development Program run by Lotus principal Tony Fernandes. In 2013, Jeffri was selected to be in the Petronas Talent Development Program and competed in the ATS FORMEL 3 CUP under Team Eurointernational.

== Racing record ==
=== Career summary ===
Season	Series	Team	Races	Wins	Poles	FLaps	Podiums	Points	Position
2010	Formula BMW Pacific	Eurasia Motorsport	15	0	0	0	0	83	5th
2011	JK Racing Asia Series	Mofaz Racing	18	1	0	1	10	186	**3rd**
2012	JK Racing Asia Series	EuroInternational	16	4	4	6	11	223	**2nd**
2013	German Formula 3 Championship	EuroInternational	25	0	0	0	0	79	8th
2014	German Formula 3 Championship	Motopark Academy	23	2	3	3	16	277	**2nd**
2014	Masters of Formula 3	Motopark	1	0	0	0	1	N/A	**3rd**
2015	FIA Formula 3 European Championship	Motopark	33	0	0	0	0	2	25th
2015	Masters of Formula 3	Motopark	1	0	0	0	0	N/A	5th
2016	GP2 Series	Arden International	22	0	0	0	0	2	22nd
2017	FIA Formula 2 Championship	Trident	22	0	0	0	0	2	23rd
2017–18	Asian Le Mans Series	Eurasia Motorsport	1	0	1	0	1	16	8th
2018	24 Hours of Le Mans - LMP2	Jackie Chan DC Racing	1	0	0	0	0	N/A	4th
2018–19	FIA World Endurance Championship - LMP2	Jackie Chan DC Racing	5	1	1	0	4	98	4th
2018–19	Asian Le Mans Series	Jackie Chan DC Racing X Jota Sport	1	0	0	0	0	0	10th

=== Complete German Formula Three Championship results ===
(key) (Races in bold indicate pole position) (Races in italics indicate fastest lap)

Year	Entrant	1	2	3	4	5	6	7	8	9	10	11	12	13	14	15	16	17	18	19	20	21	22	23	24	25	26	27	DC	Points
2013	EuroInternational	OSC1; 1; 9	OSC1; 2; 10	OSC1; 2; 9	SPA; 1; 7	SPA; 2; 7	SPA; 3; 19†	NÜR1; 1; 17	NÜR1; 2 C	NÜR1; 3; 8	SAC; 1; 14	SAC; 2; 5	SAC; 3; 6	LAU1; 1; 7	LAU1; 2; 8	LAU1; 3; 9	NÜR2; 1; 10	NÜR2; 2; 7	NÜR2; 3; 6	LAU2; 1; 9	LAU2; 2; 6	LAU2; 3; 9	OSC2; 1; 6	OSC2; 2; 5	OSC2; 3; 8	HOC; 1; 6	HOC; 2 Ret	HOC; 3 DNS	8th	79
2014	Motopark	OSC; 1; 6	OSC; 2; 1	**OSC**; **2**; 2	LAU1; 1 Ret	LAU1; 2; 8	LAU1; 3; 2	RBR; 1; 2	RBR; 2; 2	RBR; 3; 2	**HOC1**; **1**; 1	HOC1; 2 Ret	HOC1; 3; 2	NÜR; 1; 2	NÜR; 2; 2	NÜR; 3; 3	LAU2; 1; 2	LAU2; 2 C	LAU2; 3; 2	SAC; 1; 2	SAC; 2; 5	SAC; 3; 8	HOC2; 1; 3	HOC2; 2; 3	**HOC2**; **3** Ret				2nd	277

=== Complete FIA Formula 3 European Championship results ===
(key) (Races in bold indicate pole position) (Races in italics indicate fastest lap)

Year	Entrant	Engine	1	2	3	4	5	6	7	8	9	10	11	12	13	14	15	16	17	18	19	20	21	22	23	24	25	26	27	28	29	30	31	32	33	DC	Points
2015	Motopark	Volkswagen	SIL; 1; 15	SIL; 2; 13	SIL; 3; 15	HOC; 1; 22	HOC; 2; 22	HOC; 3; 22	PAU; 1; 18	PAU; 2; 17	PAU; 3; 15	MNZ; 1 Ret	MNZ; 2; 21	MNZ; 3; 21	SPA; 1; 24	SPA; 2; 17	SPA; 3; 23	NOR; 1; 24	NOR; 2; 24	NOR; 3 Ret	ZAN; 1; 9	ZAN; 2; 22	ZAN; 3; 18	RBR; 1; 14	RBR; 2; 16	RBR; 3; 21	ALG; 1; 18	ALG; 2 Ret	ALG; 3; 20	NÜR; 1; 17	NÜR; 2; 22	NÜR; 3; 12	HOC; 1; 21	HOC; 2 Ret	HOC; 3 Ret	25th	2

=== Complete GP2 Series/FIA Formula 2 Championship results ===
(key) (Races in bold indicate pole position) (Races in italics indicate fastest lap)

Year	Entrant	1	2	3	4	5	6	7	8	9	10	11	12	13	14	15	16	17	18	19	20	21	22	DC	Points
2016	Arden International	CAT; FEA; 19	CAT; SPR; 18	MON; FEA; Ret	MON; SPR; 17	BAK; FEA; Ret	BAK; SPR; 7	RBR; FEA; Ret	RBR; SPR; 17	SIL; FEA; 17	SIL; SPR; 15	HUN; FEA; 20	HUN; SPR; 16	HOC; FEA; 11	HOC; SPR; Ret	SPA; FEA; 19	SPA; SPR; 18	MNZ; FEA; 13	MNZ; SPR; 12	SEP; FEA; 18	SEP; SPR; Ret	YMC; FEA; Ret	YMC; SPR; 20	22nd	2
2017	Trident	BHR; FEA; 19	BHR; FEA; 16	CAT; FEA; 18	CAT; SPR; 18	MON; FEA; 14	MON; SPR; 11	BAK; FEA; Ret	BAK; SPR; 17	RBR; FEA; 18	RBR; SPR; 12	SIL; FEA; 15	SIL; SPR; 18	HUN; FEA; 12	HUN; SPR; 15	SPA; FEA; 11	SPA; SPR; 15	MNZ; FEA; 12	MNZ; SPR; 17	JER; FEA; 9	JER; SPR; 15	YMC; FEA; Ret	YMC; SPR; 16	23rd	2

=== Complete FIA World Endurance Championship results ===
(key) (Races in bold indicate pole position; races in italics indicate fastest lap)

Year	Entrant	Class	Chassis	Engine	1	2	3	4	5	6	7	8	Rank	Points
2018–19	Jackie Chan DC Racing	LMP2	Oreca 07	Gibson GK428 4.2 L V8	SPA; 3	LMS; 2	**SIL**; 2	FUJ; 1	SHA; 4	SEB	SPA	LMS	4th	98

=== 24 Hours of Le Mans results ===
Year	Team	Co-Drivers	Car	Class	Laps	Pos.	Class Pos.
2018	(China) Jackie Chan DC Racing	(Malaysia) Jazeman Jaafar (Malaysia) Weiron Tan	Oreca 07-Gibson	LMP2	361	8th	4th
