= Jean-Pierre Frey =

Swiss racing driver

Jean-Pierre Frey (born January 6, 1955) is a former Swiss racing driver from Baselgia, Medel (Lucmagn). He competed in full seasons of the FIA Formula 3000 Championship in 1986 and 1987, but failed to qualify for a single race in a time when the series was incredibly competitive. Frey went to the United States to race in two CART Championship Car races in 1988 for Dick Simon Racing and two more for Euromotorsport in 1989. He entered the 1989 Indianapolis 500 but his entry was declined due to a lack of experience. His best CART finish was 13th place in his debut at Laguna Seca Raceway. Frey also participated in sports car racing, including the World Sports Car Championship, the 1985 and 1988 24 Hours of Le Mans, and the 1989 24 Hours of Daytona where he drove a Zakspeed prepared Ford Probe GT-Prototype with teammates Marty Roth and Albert Naon, Jr.

== Racing record ==
=== 24 Hours of Le Mans results ===
Year	Team	Co-Drivers	Car	Class	Laps	Pos.	Class Pos.
1985	(Italy) Carma F.F. (Cheetah)	(Switzerland) Loris Kessel (Italy) Ruggero Melgrati (Italy) Aldo Bertuzzi	Alba AR2-Carma	C2	-	DNS	DNS
1988	(Italy) Dollop Racing	(Italy) Nicola Marozzo (Italy) Ranieri Randaccio	Lancia LC2-Ferrari	C1	255	DNF	DNF

=== Complete International Formula 3000 results ===
(key) (Races in bold indicate pole position; races in italics indicate fastest lap.)

Year	Entrant	Chassis	Engine	1	2	3	4	5	6	7	8	9	10	11	Pos.	Pts
1986	Équipe Dollop	March 85B	Cosworth	SIL; DNQ	VAL; DNQ	PAU; DNQ	SPA; DNQ	IMO; DNQ	MUG; DNQ	PER; DNQ		BIR; DNQ			NC	0
1986	Équipe Dollop	March 86B	Cosworth								ÖST; DNQ		BUG; DNQ	JAR; DNQ	NC	0
1987	Équipe Dollop	March 86B	Cosworth	SIL; DNQ	VAL; DNQ	SPA; DNQ	PAU	DON; DNQ	PER; DNQ	BRH; DNQ	BIR; DNQ	IMO; DNQ	BUG	JAR	NC	0

=== American open–wheel racing results ===
(key)

==== CART PPG Indy Car World Series ====
Year	Team	Chassis	Engine	1	2	3	4	5	6	7	8	9	10	11	12	13	14	15	Pos.	Pts	Ref
1988	Dick Simon Racing	Lola T87/00	Cosworth DFX V8t	PHX	LBH	INDY	MIL	POR	CLE	TOR	MEA	MCH	POC	MDO	ROA	NAZ	LAG; 13	MIA; 19	37th	0	
1989	Euromotorsport	Lola T88/00	Cosworth DFX V8t	PHX; 21	LBH	INDY	MIL; DNQ	DET; DNQ											41st	0	
1989	Bettenhausen Motorsports	Lola T87/00	Cosworth DFX V8t						POR; 15	CLE	MEA	TOR	MCH	POC	MDO	ROA	NAZ	LAG	41st	0	
