= Weiron Tan =

Malaysian racecar driver (born 1994)

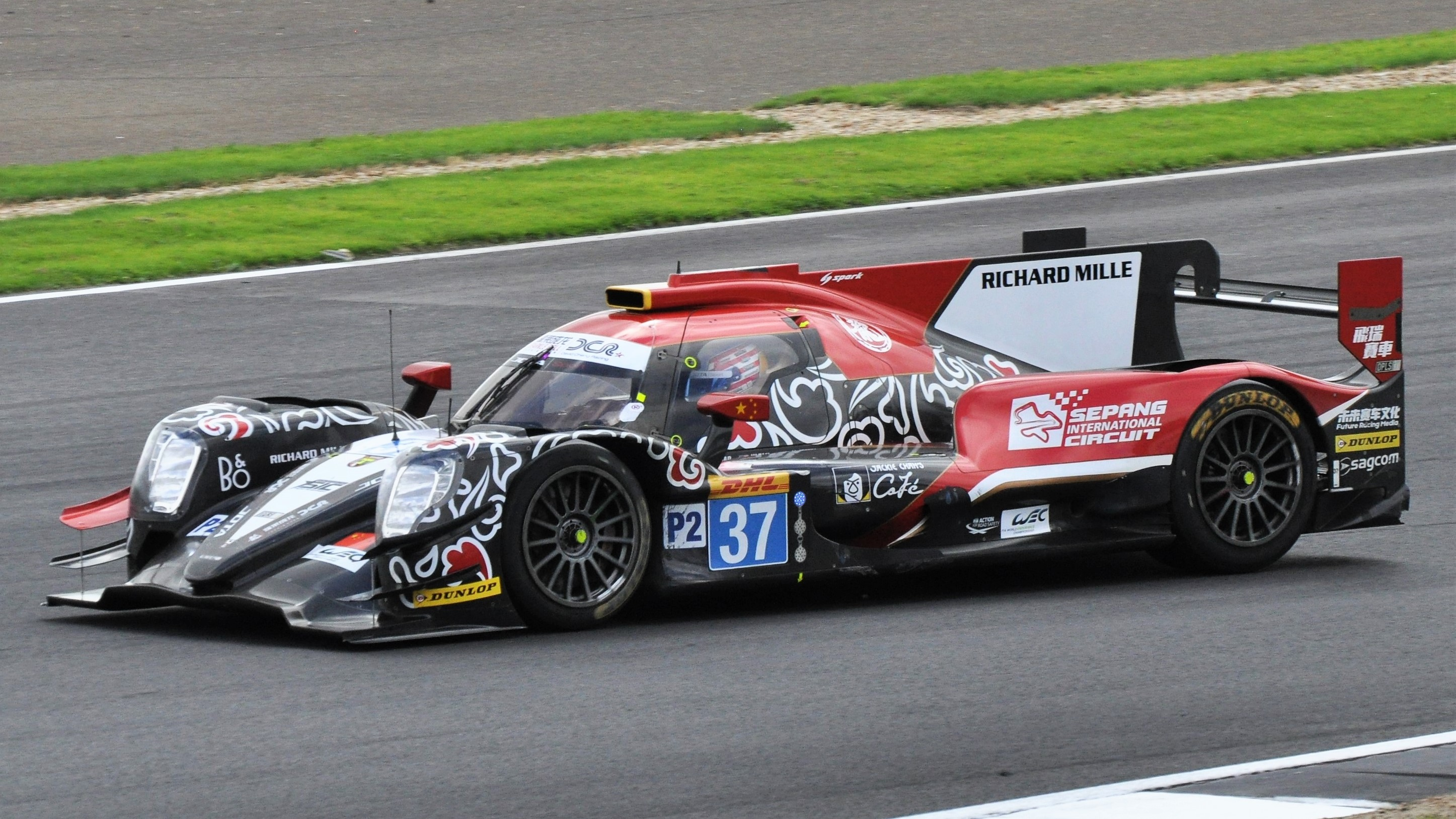
- Tan at the 2018 6 Hours of Silverstone
- Nationality: (Malaysia) Malaysian
- Born: 3 December 1994 (age 31) Kuala Lumpur, Malaysia

FIA World Endurance Championship - LMP2 career
- Debut season: 2018
- Current team: Jackie Chan DC Racing
- Categorisation: FIA Silver
- Car number: 37
- Starts: 5
- Wins: 1
- Poles: 1
- Best finish: 4th in 2018-19

Weiron Tan (Chinese: 陈韦龙; pinyin: Chén Wéilóng; Pe̍h-ōe-jī: Tîn Ûi-lêng, born 3 December 1994) is a Malaysian racing driver who last competed in the GT World Challenge Asia for Audi Sport Team Absolute. He previously competed in the FIA World Endurance Championship for Jackie Chan DC Racing, where he, along with Jazeman Jaafar and Nabil Jeffri, became the first and only driver from Malaysia to win an FIA-sanctioned race at the international level.

== Career ==
=== Karting ===
Tan was first introduced to go-karts at the age of 13, and by the age of 15, he was the first Malaysian champion in the PLUS Yamaha SL Cup Championship and the same year saw him emerge as vice champion in the Asian Karting Open Championship. In 2011, Tan made his racing debut in Europe, competing in the WSK Series under the Works Kosmic Racing Kart Team. Tan was also the only Malaysian among six other young international drivers chosen in the AirAsia Team Lotus Driver Development Program in 2011, later known as the Caterham F1 Academy.

=== Lotus GT4 Supercup Asia ===
In 2011, Tan took part in the Lotus GT4 Supercup Asia Series as the youngest contender. He went on to win the championship, taking the most wins, podium finishes and pole positions.

=== JK Racing Asia Series ===
In 2012, Tan competed part-time in the single-seater championship JK Racing Asia Series.

=== Formula Gulf 1000 ===
Later in 2012, Tan took part in selected rounds of Formula Gulf 1000 as well, the series in which he scored his first Formula race victory in Abu Dhabi. He followed that up with a double race win at the next meet and a fourth win at the season finale in Dubai, taking four victories from a possible six.

=== Formula Renault 2.0 ===
In April 2013, Tan embarked in the UK-based Protyre Formula Renault 2.0 Championship with Fortec Motorsport. He made a huge impact, scoring five race wins and nine podium finishes to secure runner-up in the championship.

=== German Formula 3 ===
2014 saw Tan move up to the ATS Formel 3 Cup with Van Amersfoort Racing. The start of the season proved challenging as he acclimatised to the new series and car, but he rounded out the year with a string of strong results, including five podium finishes and two race wins towards the end of the season finishing fifth overall.

=== Pro Mazda Championship ===
Ahead of the 2015 season, Tan made the move to the United States to compete in the Pro Mazda Championship with Andretti Autosport, a series which forms a major step in the Road to Indy programme. Ahead of the start of the season, he competed in the five-race Winterfest, a key learning opportunity for him to compete in the cars. He immediately impressed, scoring two dominant race wins and three second places on his way to taking vice-champion honours. In the main series he had a successful rookie year, finishing fourth in the overall standings, scoring four victories and six podium finishes along the way. Tan became the first ever Malaysian in history to win in the United States and on an oval race. He continued with the series in 2016, joining championship winning outfit Team Pelfrey, but only competed in the first two rounds.

=== China GT Championship ===
In 2017, Tan made a full-time switch to sportscar racing, debuting in the China GT Championship with Absolute Racing competing in a Bentley GT3.

=== FIA World Endurance Championship ===
2018 saw Tan compete in the final two rounds of the 2017-18 Asian Le Mans Series with Jackie Chan DC Racing. With backing from Sepang International Circuit, Tan competed alongside fellow Malaysians Jazeman Jaafar and Afiq Ikhwan. The trio successfully won on their debut at Round 3 at Buriram in the LMP2 category. The result later sparked interest in the team to enter the drivers in the 2018-19 FIA World Endurance Championship. Tan and his teammates Jazeman Jaafar and Nabil Jeffri made a very impressive debut season finishing fourth overall having only competed five of the eight rounds in the season due to the unfortunate event of Sepang International Circuit pulling out from the championship. The trio finished fourth in class at their 24 Hours of Le Mans debut, later on a second-place finish at Silverstone before securing their first victory at Fuji making history as the first ever all-Asian lineup to win on the world championship.

=== Blancpain GT World Challenge Asia ===
After a successful 2018 season, Tan was picked up by Audi Sport Asia as an official driver to compete in the GT World Challenge Asia Series with Audi Sport Asia Team Absolute. Alongside teammate Martin Rump, they racked up four podium finishes and two wins during the season, finishing sixth overall.

== Racing record ==
=== Career summary ===
Season	Series	Team	Races	Wins	Poles	F/Laps	Podiums	Points	Position
2011	Lotus GT4 Supercup Asia		8	6	8	8	7	?	**1st**
2011	JK Racing Asia Series	EuroInternational	4	0	0	0	0	0	NC†
2012	JK Racing Asia Series	EuroInternational	10	0	0	1	2	67	7th
2012-13	Formula Gulf 1000		6	4	4	3	5	?	?
2013	Protyre Formula Renault Championship	Fortec Motorsports	16	5	6	6	9	331	**2nd**
2014	German Formula 3 Championship	Van Amersfoort Racing	29	2	0	0	5	182	5th
2015	Pro Mazda Championship	Andretti Autosport	16	4	6	3	6	282	4th
2015	Pro Mazda Winterfest	Andretti Autosport	5	2	0	2	5	166	**2nd**
2016	Asian Le Mans Sprint Cup - LMP3	Team Aylezo	2	0	0	0	2	33	7th
2016	FIA Formula 3 European Championship	Carlin	9	0	0	0	0	0	25th
2016	Pro Mazda Championship	Team Pelfrey	4	0	0	0	1	69	11th
2016-17	Asian Le Mans Series - LMP3	Aylezo Ecotint Racing	3	0	0	0	0	24	10th
2017	China GT Championship - GT3	Bentley Team Absolute	8	0	1	0	0	50	9th
2017	Blancpain GT Series Asia - GT3	Bentley Team Absolute	2	0	0	0	0	0	NC†
2017-18	Asian Le Mans Series - LMP2	Jackie Chan DC Racing X Jota	2	1	0	0	1	35	5th
2018	24 Hours of Le Mans - LMP2	Jackie Chan DC Racing	1	0	0	0	0	N/A	4th
2018-19	FIA World Endurance Championship - LMP2	Jackie Chan DC Racing	5	1	1	0	4	98	4th
2018-19	Asian Le Mans Series - LMP2	Jackie Chan DC Racing X Jota Sport	1	0	0	0	0	0	NC
2019	Blancpain GT World Challenge Asia	Audi Sport Asia Team Absolute Racing	12	2	2	0	4	115	7th
2019	FIA Motorsport Games GT Cup	Team Malaysia	3	0	0	0	0	N/A	11th
2021	Michelin Pilot Challenge - GS	Automatic Racing AMR	1	0	0	0	0	110	63rd
2024	FIA Motorsport Games GT Cup	Team Malaysia	1	0	0	0	0	N/A	11th
2025	Lamborghini Super Trofeo Asia - Pro-Am	Arrows Racing	8	0	1	3	1	42	8th
2026	TSS The Super Series - GT4	Toyota Gazoo Racing Malaysia							

† As Tan was a guest driver, he was ineligible to score points.

=== Complete German Formula Three Championship results ===
(key) (Races in bold indicate pole position) (Races in italics indicate fastest lap)

Year	Entrant	1	2	3	4	5	6	7	8	9	10	11	12	13	14	15	16	17	18	19	20	21	22	23	24	DC	Points
2014	Van Amersfoort Racing	OSC; 1; 9	OSC; 2; 6	OSC; 2; 5	LAU1; 1; 6	LAU1; 2; 6	LAU1; 3; 7	RBR; 1; 10	RBR; 2; 4	RBR; 3; 4	HOC1; 1; 4	HOC1; 2; 4	HOC1; 3; 8	NÜR; 1; 4	NÜR; 2; 8	NÜR; 3; 6	LAU2; 1 Ret	LAU2; 2 C	LAU2; 3 Ret	SAC; 1; 3	SAC; 2; 2	SAC; 3; 3	HOC2; 1; 1	HOC2; 2 Ret	HOC2; 3; 1	5th	182

=== Pro Mazda Championship ===
Year	Team	1	2	3	4	5	6	7	8	9	10	11	12	13	14	15	16	17	Rank	Points
2015	Andretti Autosport	STP; 16	STP; 15	**LOU**; 2	**LOU**; C	**BAR**; 1	**BAR**; 14	**IMS**; 1	IMS; 4	IMS; 21	**LOR**; 1	TOR; 13	TOR; 2	**IOW**; 1	MOH; 6	MOH; 7	LAG; 5	LAG; 9	**4th**	**282**
2016	Team Pelfrey	STP; 5	STP; 3	ALA; 4	ALA; 10	IMS	IMS	LOR	ROA	ROA	TOR	TOR	MOH	MOH	LAG	LAG	LAG		**11th**	**69**

NOTE: The first Indianapolis Motor Speedway race was scored as the second NOLA Motorsports Park race because of weather.

=== Complete FIA World Endurance Championship results ===
(key) (Races in bold indicate pole position; races in italics indicate fastest lap)

Year	Entrant	Class	Chassis	Engine	1	2	3	4	5	6	7	8	Rank	Points
2018–19	Jackie Chan DC Racing	LMP2	Oreca 07	Gibson GK428 4.2 L V8	SPA; 3	LMS; 2	**SIL**; 2	FUJ; 1	SHA; 4	SEB	SPA	LMS	4th	98

=== 24 Hours of Le Mans results ===
Year	Team	Co-Drivers	Car	Class	Laps	Pos.	Class Pos.
2018	(China) Jackie Chan DC Racing	(Malaysia) Jazeman Jaafar (Malaysia) Nabil Jeffri	Oreca 07-Gibson	LMP2	361	8th	4th
