= Carrie Schreiner =

German racing driver

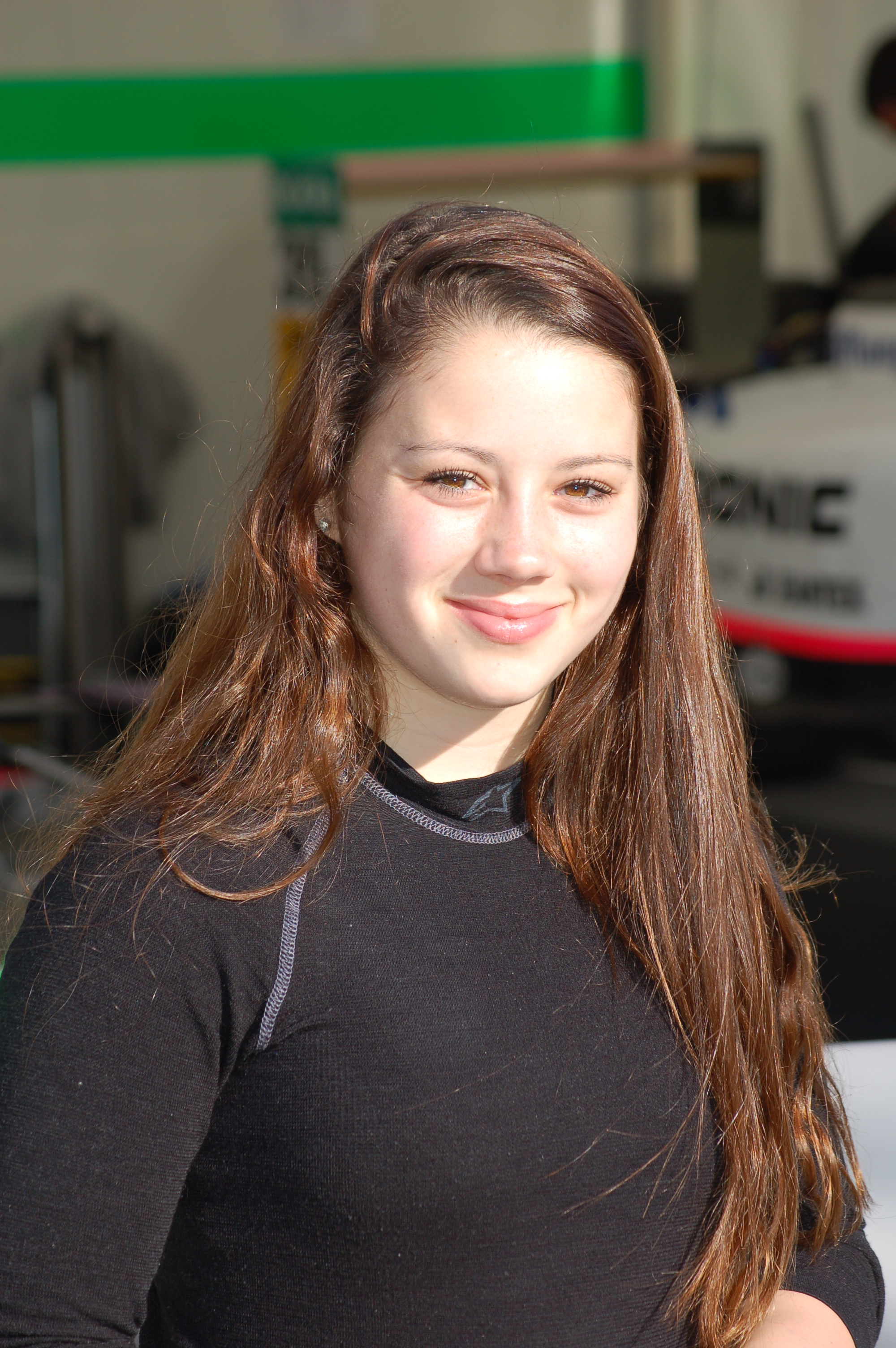
- Schreiner in 2015
- Nationality: German
- Born: 14 September 1998 (age 28) Völklingen, Saarland, Germany

GT World Challenge Europe career
- Debut season: 2026
- Current team: Tresor Attempto Racing
- Categorisation: FIA Silver (2017–2026) (Note: In 2026, Schreiner held an FIA Driver Categorisation of Silver, but was reclassified as Bronze by SRO for the 2026 GT World Challenge Europe.); FIA Bronze (2027–)
- Starts: 0
- Wins: 0
- Podiums: 0
- Poles: 0
- Fastest laps: 0
- Best finish: TBD in 2026

Previous series
- 2015–2016 2016 2017–2018 2017 2017 2017 2017–2019 2018 2018–2022 2019–2020 2020, 2022 2021 2023-2024 2025 2025: ADAC Formula 4 F4 British Championship; Lamborghini Super Trofeo Europe - Am; Lamborghini Super Trofeo Europe - Pro; Lamborghini Super Trofeo Asia; Lamborghini Super Trofeo Middle East - Pro; DMV Gran Turismo Touring Car Cup; Lamborghini Super Trofeo Middle East - Pro-Am; Nürburgring Endurance Series; ADAC GT Masters; 24H GT Series; Italian GT Championship; F1 Academy; GT Winter Series; ADAC GT Masters

Championship titles
- 2018: DMV Gran Turismo Touring Car Cup; Lamborghini Super Trofeo Middle East - Pro-Am

Carrie Schreiner (born 14 September 1998) is a German racing driver who currently competes in the GT World Challenge Europe for Tresor Attempto Racing. She has previously competed in F1 Academy and the ADAC GT Masters. Schreiner also currently serves as an Audi F1 Team and Schaeffler brand ambassador.

== Career ==
Schreiner began her motorsport career in karting. Between 2011 and 2014, she drove in the ADAC Kart Masters, achieving her greatest success in 2012 when she won the X30 Junior championship title.

=== Single-seaters ===
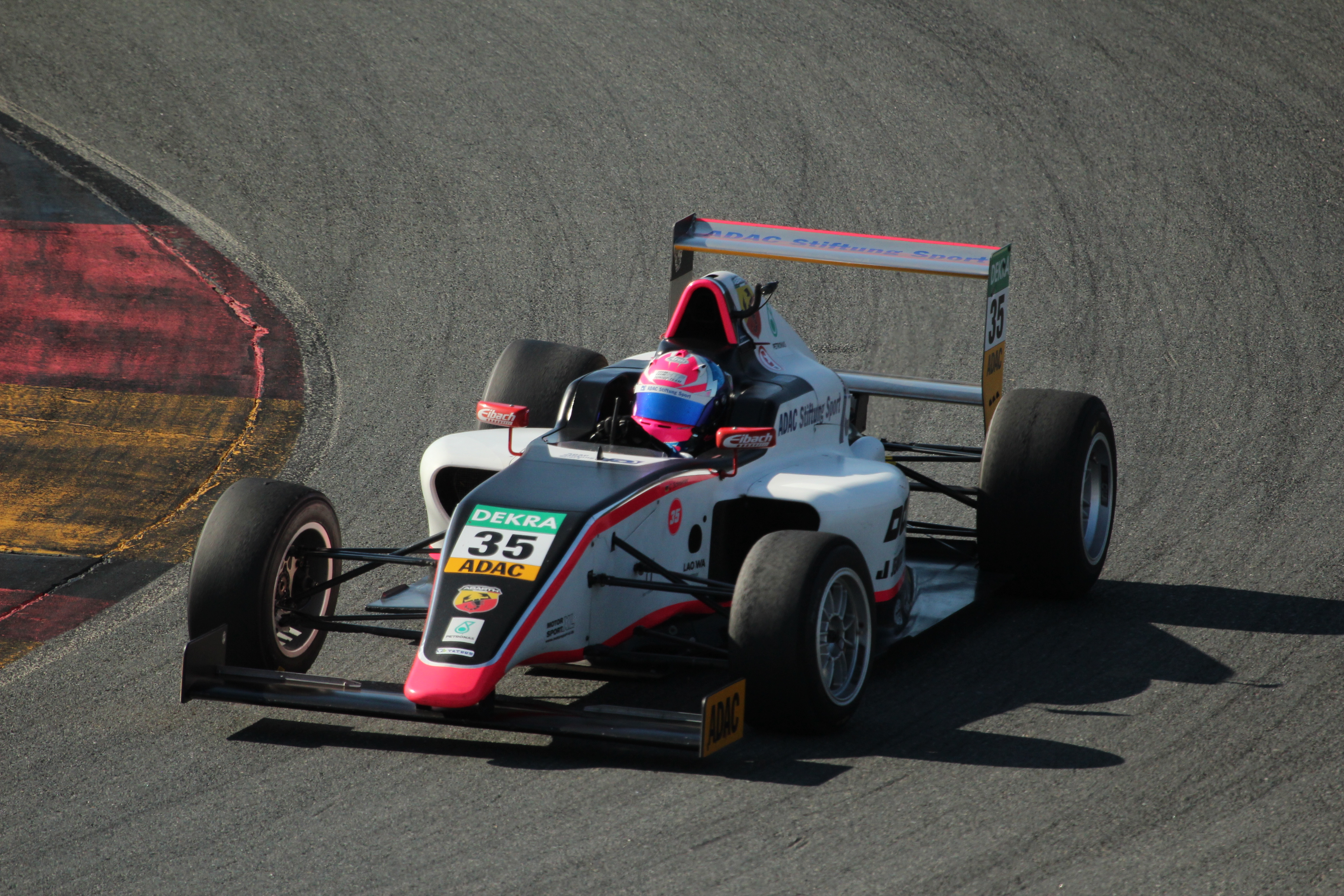
Schreiner competing in ADAC Formula 4 in 2015.

Schreiner switched to single-seater racing and competed in ADAC Formula 4 in 2015 and 2016. At the same time, she drove in the British Formula 4 Championship in 2016, where she finished 17th overall.

=== GT racing ===
In 2017, Schreiner moved up to GT cars via the Lamborghini Super Trofeo, competing in several of their championships over the next two years. She finished runner-up in the 2017 Lamborghini Super Trofeo Middle East and a year later won the Pro-Am category in the same series with Konrad Motorsport, having also contested the European Lamborghini Super Trofeo championship with the Austrian squad. At the same time, she competed with the FFF Racing Team in Lamborghini Super Trofeo Asia in 2017.

In the DMV GT & Touring Car Cup, she drove an Audi R8 LMS GT3 from 2017 to 2019, first with Aust Motorsport and later from 2018 with Rutronik Racing – winning the championship in 2018. As a result, she stepped up to ADAC GT Masters with the same team – scoring a best championship finish of 24th place in her first season in the series with co-driver Dennis Marschall.

From 2018, Schreiner has been a regular participant in the Nürburgring Endurance Series. After achieving her Class A license, she became one of the founding drivers of the "Girls only" program by WS Racing; attempting to encourage more women into the sport. Since 2019, Schreiner has contested four Nürburgring 24 Hours races with the team, winning her class in the 2021 edition. From 2021, she stepped up to the SP9 class for GT3 machinery, competing with Racing One and SchnitzelAlm Racing.

In 2021, Schreiner started in the newly founded BMW M2 Cup - a one-make series on the Deutsche Tourenwagen Masters support bill. Simultaneously she drove in the Italian GT Championship with AF Corse, finishing second at the Vallelunga round with Antonio Fuoco.

=== F1 Academy ===
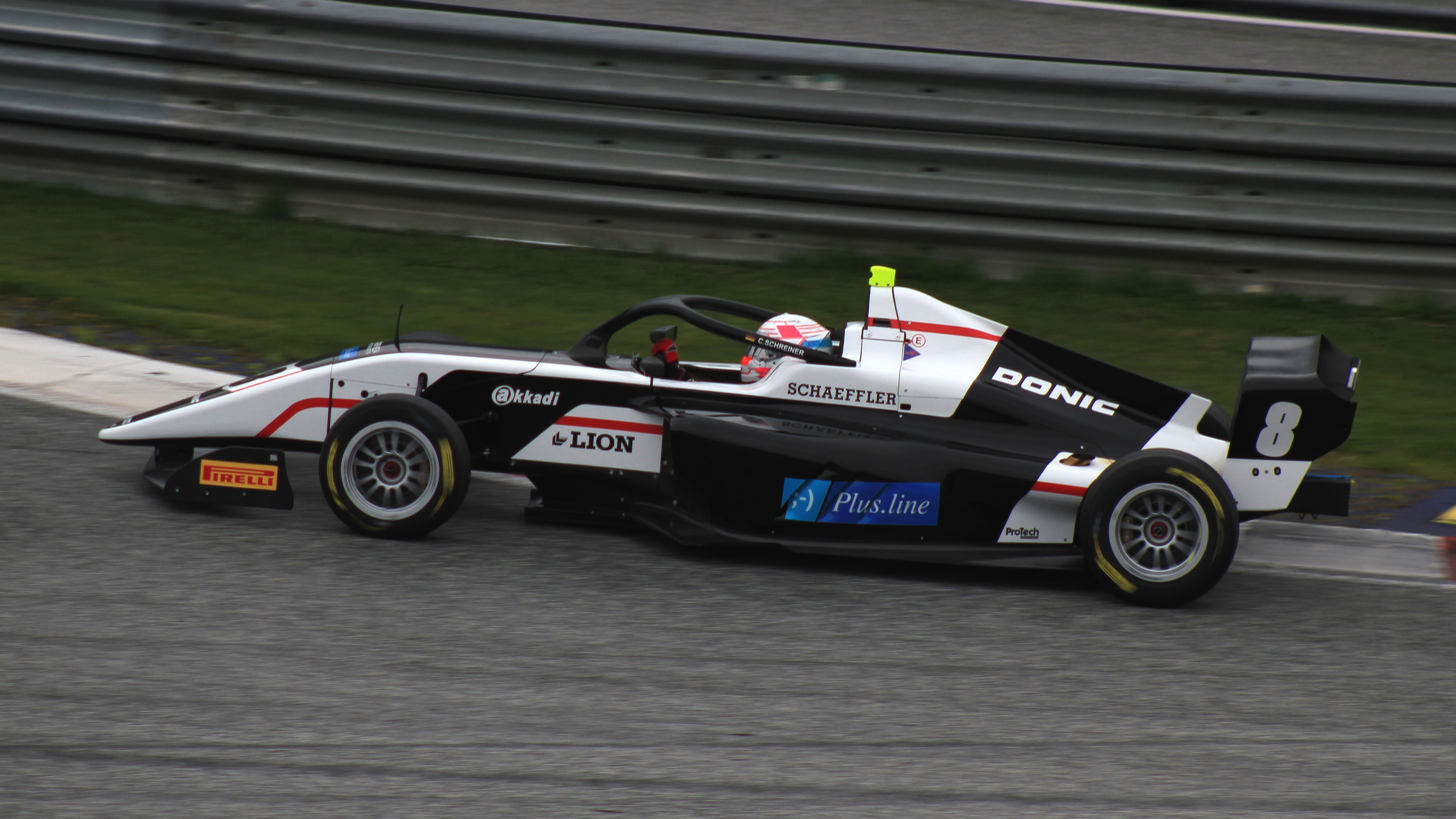
Schreiner competing in F1 Academy in 2023.

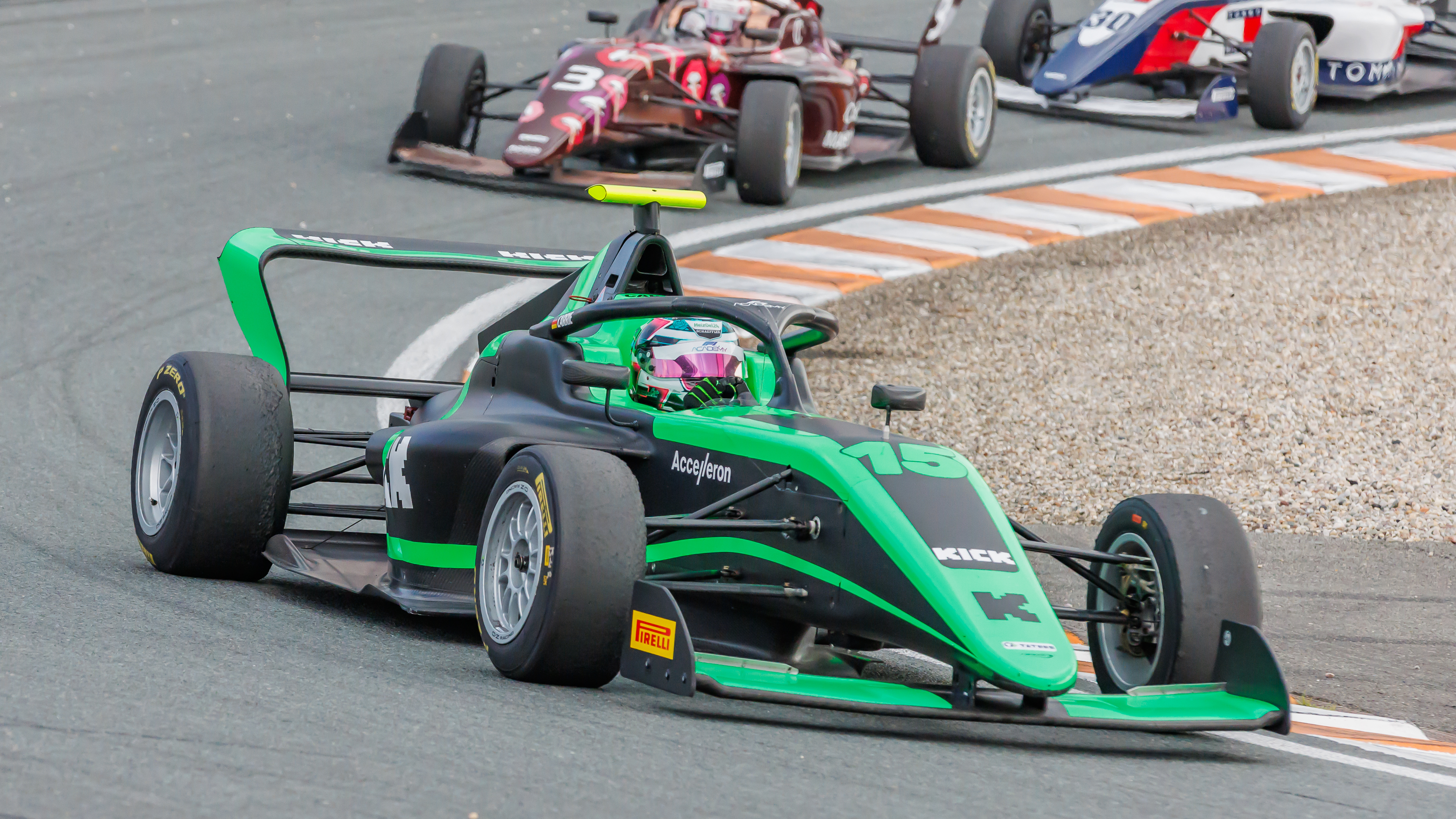
Schreiner competing in F1 Academy in 2024.

In 2023, Schreiner moved back to entry-level single-seaters to compete in F1 Academy with ART Grand Prix. She finished the season in 11th, with a win in the reverse-grid race at Zandvoort. She stayed in the category for the 2024 season and became the oldest regularly-entered driver, moving from ART to Campos and gaining support from Sauber as part of the series' agreement with Formula One. As preparation for the season, she also competed in select round of the F4 UAE Championship, and the F4 British Championship, returning to the series after eight years. Schreiner finished the F1 Academy season in ninth, following which Sauber announced that she would be continue as a Team Brand Ambassador. She returned in the following year in a supporting role as a mentor to Emma Felbermayr, who succeeded Schreiner as the Sauber supported driver.

== Personal life ==
Schreiner is in a relationship with former DTM driver Peter Terting, some 14 years older than Schreiner.

== Racing record ==
=== Career summary ===
Season	Series	Team	Races	Wins	Poles	F/Laps	Podiums	Points	Position
2015	ADAC Formula 4 Championship	HTP Motorsport	18	0	0	0	0	0	44th
2016	ADAC Formula 4 Championship	US Racing	21	0	0	0	0	0	43rd
2016	F4 British Championship	Double R Racing	12	0	0	0	0	14	17th
2017	DMV Gran Turismo Touring Car Cup	Aust Motorsport	2	0	0	0	1	0	NC
2017	Lamborghini Super Trofeo Europe - Am	Konrad Motorsport	4	0	0	0	0	0	NC
2017	Lamborghini Super Trofeo Europe - Pro	Konrad Motorsport	2	0	0	0	0	0	NC
2017	Lamborghini Super Trofeo Asia - Pro	FFF Racing Team	2	0	0	0	0	11	16th
2017	Lamborghini Super Trofeo Asia - Pro-Am	FFF Racing Team	10	1	1	1	7	100	**3rd**
2017	Lamborghini Super Trofeo Middle East - Pro	FFF Racing Team	6	0	0	0	5	72	**2nd**
2018	VLN Series - Cup 5	GetSpeed Performance	2	0	0	0	0	0	NC
2018	VLN Series - Cup 3	GetSpeed Performance	1	0	0	0	0	0	NC
2018	Lamborghini Super Trofeo Europe - Pro-Am	Konrad Motorsport	6	0	0	0	0	0	NC
2018	Lamborghini Super Trofeo Middle East - Pro-Am	Konrad Motorsport	6	3	0	0	5	79	**1st**
2018	DMV Gran Turismo Touring Car Cup	Rutronik Racing	12	4	8	5	11	375	**1st**
2019	VLN Series - SP3T	WS Racing	4	1	0	0	4	30.99	4th
2019	DMV Gran Turismo Touring Car Cup	Rutronik Racing	3	0	1	1	1	0	NC
2019	ADAC GT Masters	Rutronik Racing	14	0	0	0	1	22	24th
2020	ADAC GT Masters	Rutronik Racing	12	0	0	0	0	24	28th
2020	Nürburgring Langstrecken-Serie - SP3T	WS Racing	4	0	0	0	1	14.05	11th
2020	Nürburgring Langstrecken-Serie - SP8	WS Racing	4	4	0	0	4	25.83	**3rd**
2020	24H GT Series - GT4	PROsport Performance AMR	1	0	0	0	0	15	9th
2021	Nürburgring Langstrecken-Serie - SP9 Pro-Am	Racing One	2	0	0	0	1	11.43	6th
2021	Italian GT Sprint Championship GT3	AF Corse	6	0	0	0	3	54	5th
2022	Nürburgring Langstrecken-Serie - SP9 Pro	Schnitzelalm Racing	5	0	0	0	0	0	NC
2022	24H GT Series - 992	Plusline Racing	1	0	0	0	1	15	NC
2023	F1 Academy	ART Grand Prix	21	1	0	0	1	56	11th
2024	Formula 4 UAE Championship	AGI Sport	9	0	0	0	0	0	39th
2024	F1 Academy	Campos Racing	14	0	0	0	0	34	9th
2024	Formula Winter Series	Campos Racing	4	0	0	0	0	0	39th
2024	Nürburgring Langstrecken-Serie - SP8T	Giti Tire Motorsport By WS Racing	3	0	0	0	3	0	NC
2024	24 Hours of Nürburgring - SP8T	Giti Tire Motorsport By WS Racing	1	0	0	0	1	0	**3rd**
2024	F4 British Championship	Chris Dittmann Racing	6	0	0	0	0	8	27th
2025	GT Winter Series - GT3	Konrad Motorsport	9	2	0	0	6	134	8th
2025	Nürburgring Langstrecken-Serie - SP8T	Giti Tire Motorsport by WS Racing	3	0	0	0	0	4	NC
2025	ADAC GT Masters	Land-Motorsport	12	0	0	0	0	55	14th
2026	GT World Challenge Europe Endurance Cup - Bronze	Tresor Attempto Racing	5	0	0	0	0	12	29th
2026	GT World Challenge Europe Sprint Cup - Bronze	Tresor Attempto Racing	8	0	0	0	0	17	9th
2026	GT Winter Series - GT3	Attempto Racing	2	0	0	0	0	36	37th
2026	Nürburgring Langstrecken-Serie - AT2	Giti Tire Motorsport by WS Racing	3	0	0	0	0	0	NC
2026	Nürburgring Langstrecken-Serie - AT1	équipe vitesse	3	1	0	0	1	0	NC

=== Complete ADAC Formula 4 Championship results ===
(key) (Races in bold indicate pole position; races in italics indicate fastest lap)

Year	Team	1	2	3	4	5	6	7	8	9	10	11	12	13	14	15	16	17	18	19	20	21	22	23	24	DC	Points
2015	HTP Motorsport	OSC; 1	OSC; 2	OSC; 3	SPI; 1 DNQ	SPI; 2 DNQ	SPI; 3 DNQ	SPA; 1; 30	SPA; 2; 33	SPA; 3; 27	LAU; 1; 19	LAU; 2; 19	LAU; 3 Ret	NÜR; 1; 28	NÜR; 2; 26	NÜR; 3; 29	SAC; 1; 19	SAC; 2; 24	SAC; 3; 17	OSC; 1; 29	OSC; 2; 15	OSC; 3 Ret	HOC; 1 Ret	HOC; 2; 15	HOC; 3; 21	44th	0
2016	US Racing	OSC; 1; 23	OSC; 2; 30	OSC; 3 Ret	SAC; 1; 31	SAC; 2; 25	SAC; 3; 31	LAU; 1 DNQ	LAU; 2 DNQ	LAU; 3 DNQ	OSC; 1; 23	OSC; 2 Ret	OSC; 3; 23	SPI; 1 Ret	SPI; 2; 29	SPI; 3; 24	NÜR; 1; 24	NÜR; 2; 25	NÜR; 3 Ret	ZAN; 1; 26	ZAN; 2; 25	ZAN; 3; 26	HOC; 1; 22	HOC; 2; 21	HOC; 3; 19	43rd	0

=== Complete F4 British Championship results ===
(key) (Races in bold indicate pole position; races in italics indicate fastest lap)

Year	Team	1	2	3	4	5	6	7	8	9	10	11	12	13	14	15	16	17	18	19	20	21	22	23	24	25	26	27	28	29	30	31	32	DC	Points
2016	Double R Racing	BHI; 1; 15	BHI; 2; 15	BHI; 3; 15	DON; 1	DON; 2	DON; 3	THR; 1; 13	THR; 2; 4	THR; 3; 16	OUL; 1	OUL; 2	OUL; 3	CRO; 1	CRO; 2	CRO; 3	SNE; 1	SNE; 2	SNE; 3	KNO; 1	KNO; 2	KNO; 3	ROC; 1; 10	ROC; 2 Ret	ROC; 3; 15	SIL; 1; 13	SIL; 2; 10	SIL; 3; 16	BHGP; 1	BHGP; 2	BHGP; 3			17th	14
2024	Chris Dittmann Racing	DPN; 1	DPN; 2	DPN; 3	BHI; 1	BHI; 2	BHI; 3	SNE; 1	SNE; 2	SNE; 3	THR; 1	THR; 2	THR; 3	SILGP; 1; 21	SILGP; 2; 18	SILGP; 3; 19	ZAN; 1; 21	ZAN; 2; 20	ZAN; 3; 13	KNO; 1	KNO; 2	KNO; 3	DPGP; 1	DPGP; 2	DPGP; 3	DPGP; 4	SILN; 1	SILN; 2	SILN; 3	BHGP; 1	BHGP; 2	BHGP; 3	BHGP; 4	27th	8

=== Complete Nürburgring 24 Hours results ===
Year	Team (Entrant)	Co-Drivers	Car	Class	Laps	Ovr. Pos.	Class Pos.
2019	(Germany) WS Racing (Girls Only Team by WS Racing)	(Germany) Ronja Aßmann (Switzerland) Jasmin Preisig	Volkswagen Golf Mk.7 TCR	SP3T	59	DNF	DNF
2020^{1}	(Germany) WS Racing (Giti Tire Motorsport by WS Racing GIRLS ONLY)	(Austria) Laura Kraihamer (France) Célia Martin	Volkswagen Golf Mk.7 TCR	SP3T	62	72nd	**3rd**
2021^{1}	(Germany) WS Racing (Giti Tire Motorsport by WS Racing GIRLS ONLY)	(United Kingdom) Pippa Mann (France) Célia Martin (Denmark) Christina Nielsen	Audi R8 LMS GT4 Evo	SP8	52	45th	**1st**
2022	(Germany) WS Racing (Giti Tire Motorsport by WS Racing GIRLS ONLY)	(United Kingdom) Pippa Mann (France) Célia Martin (Liechtenstein) Fabienne Wohlwend	BMW M4 (F82) GT4	SP8T	139	35th	**3rd**
2024^{1}	(Germany) WS Racing (Giti Tire Motorsport by WS Racing GIRLS ONLY)	(United Kingdom) Pippa Mann (Liechtenstein) Fabienne Wohlwend (Netherlands) Beitske Visser	BMW M4 (G82) GT4	SP8T	44	47th	**3rd**
2025	(Germany) WS Racing (WS Racing by Küpper Racing)	(Germany) Janina Schall (Latvia) Patricija Stalidzane (Liechtenstein) Fabienne Wohlwend	BMW M4 (G82) GT4	AT3	104	66th	4th
2026	(Germany) WS Racing (Giti Tire Motorsport by WS Racing)	(Germany) Michelle Halder (Germany) Janina Schall (Liechtenstein) Fabienne Wohlwend	Porsche 911 (992) GT3 Cup	AT2	0	WD	

- **^1** – Races were shortened due to inclement weather conditions.

=== Complete ADAC GT Masters results ===
(key) (Races in bold indicate pole position; races in italics indicate fastest lap)

Year	Team	Car	1	2	3	4	5	6	7	8	9	10	11	12	13	14	DC	Points
2019	HCB-Rutronik Racing	Audi R8 LMS Evo	OSC; 1; 25	OSC; 2; 22	MST; 1 Ret	MST; 2; 15	RBR; 1 Ret	RBR; 2 Ret	ZAN; 1; 14	ZAN; 2; 19	NÜR; 1; 14	NÜR; 2; 17	**HOC**; **1**; 3	HOC; 2 Ret	SAC; 1 DNS	SAC; 2; 25	24th	22
2020	Rutronik Racing	Audi R8 LMS Evo	LAU; 1 Ret	LAU; 2 Ret	NÜR; 1; 8	NÜR; 2; 26	**HOC**; **1**; 10	HOC; 2; 17	SAC; 1; 21	**SAC**; **2**; 8	RBR; 1; 22	RBR; 2; 14	LAU; 1	LAU; 2	OSC; 1; 25	OSC; 2; 19	28th	24
2025	Land-Motorsport	Audi R8 LMS Evo II	LAU; 1; 12	LAU; 2; 7	ZAN; 1; 11	ZAN; 2; 13	NÜR; 1 Ret	NÜR; 2; 10	SAL; 1; 12	SAL; 2; 11	RBR; 1; 13	RBR; 2; 15	HOC; 1; 10	HOC; 2; 13			14th	55

=== Complete F1 Academy results ===
(key) (Races in bold indicate pole position; races in italics indicate fastest lap)

Year	Team	1	2	3	4	5	6	7	8	9	10	11	12	13	14	15	16	17	18	19	20	21	DC	Points
2023	ART Grand Prix	RBR; 1 Ret	RBR; 2; 10	RBR; 3; 7	CRT; 1; 12	CRT; 2; 11	CRT; 3; 8	CAT; 1; 9	CAT; 2; 10	CAT; 3; 13	ZAN; 1; 6	ZAN; 2; 1	ZAN; 3; 8	MNZ; 1 Ret	MNZ; 2; 4	MNZ; 3; 6	LEC; 1; 9	LEC; 2; 6	LEC; 3; 8	COA; 1; 11	COA; 2; 11	COA; 3; 14	11th	56
2024	Campos Racing	JED; 1; 10	JED; 2; 7	MIA; 1; 12	MIA; 2; 9	CAT; 1; 12	CAT; 2; 11	ZAN; 1; 10	ZAN; 2; 6	SIN; 1; 8	SIN; 2; 9	LSL; 1; 12	LSL; 2 C	YMC; 1; 9	YMC; 2 Ret	YMC; 2; 6							9th	34

=== Complete Formula 4 UAE Championship results ===
(key) (Races in bold indicate pole position; races in italics indicate fastest lap)

Year	Team	1	2	3	4	5	6	7	8	9	10	11	12	13	14	15	DC	Points
2024	AGI Sport	YMC1; 1; 28	YMC1; 2; 23	YMC1; 3; 23	YMC2; 1; 21	YMC2; 2; 21	YMC2; 3; 25	DUB1; 1	DUB1; 2	DUB1; 3	YMC3; 1	YMC3; 2	YMC3; 3	DUB2; 1; 28	DUB2; 2; 28	DUB2; 3 Ret	39th	0

=== Complete Formula Winter Series results ===
(key) (Races in bold indicate pole position; races in italics indicate fastest lap)

Year	Team	1	2	3	4	5	6	7	8	9	10	11	12	DC	Points
2024	Campos Racing	JER; 1; 17	JER; 2; 29	JER; 3; 25	CRT; 1	CRT; 2	CRT; 3	ARA; 1 Ret	ARA; 2 WD	ARA; 3 DNS	CAT; 1	CAT; 2	CAT; 3	39th	0

=== Complete GT World Challenge Europe results ===
==== GT World Challenge Europe Endurance Cup ====
Year	Team	Car	Class	1	2	3	4	5	6	7	DC	Points
2026	Tresor Attempto Racing	Audi R8 LMS Evo II	Bronze	LEC; 43	MNZ; 29	SPA; 6H; 54	SPA; 12H; 56†	SPA; 24H; Ret	NÜR; 42	ALG; 36	29th	12

==== GT World Challenge Europe Sprint Cup results ====
Year	Team	Car	Class	1	2	3	4	5	6	7	8	DC	Points
2026	Tresor Attempto Racing	Audi R8 LMS Evo II	Bronze	MIS; 1; 39	MIS; 2; 37	MAG; 1; 39	MAG; 2; 33	ZAN; 1; 39	ZAN; 2; 36	CAT; 1; 38	CAT; 2; 34	9th	17
