= 2011 JK Racing Asia Series =

2011 JK Racing Asia Series season

Seasons
- ← 2010 2012 →

The 2011 JK Racing Asia Series was the first season of the rebranded Formula BMW Pacific Series, which ran for seven seasons in Asia. The championship began on 9 April in Sepang and was scheduled to finish on 30 October in India after eighteen races held at six meetings. However, due to unexpected cancellations, the final meeting was held on 4 December in Sepang.

Nine teams fielded 28 full-time and guest drivers during the tour.

Austrian rookie Lucas Auer, the nephew of Formula 1 driver Gerhard Berger became the 2011 JK Racing Asia Series Driver Champion with 292 points after scoring 17 podium finishes from 18 races with 7 wins. His nearest competitor, Afiq Ikhwan, took 10 wins during the whole season, equalling the record previously set by Jazeman Jaafar, but only managed second overall with 285 points.

Lucas Auer was also crowned the JK Racing Asia Series Rookie of the Year 2011 for finishing the season as the rookie with the most points. After collecting 2 points for taking 2 pole positions in India, Auer made his lead in the rookie standings unassailable, thus deciding the rookie title with 6 races to go. His nearest challenger, Irfan Ilyas from Petronas Mofaz Racing Team managed 135 points from the whole season.

Auer's consistent podium finishes also resulted in his team Eurointernational being crowned the JK Racing Asia Series Team Trophy Winners 2011 with 574 points.

== Teams and drivers ==
- All cars are BMW-engined Mygale FB02 chassis. Guest drivers in italics.

Team	No	Driver	Class	Rounds
(Philippines) Eurasia Motorsport	3	(Thailand) Pasin Lathouras		1–5
(Philippines) Eurasia Motorsport	22	(United Kingdom) Daniel Cammish		6
(Philippines) Eurasia Motorsport	23	(Malaysia) Aaron Chang		All
(Philippines) Eurasia Motorsport	45	(Australia) Duvashen Padayachee		1–5
(Philippines) Eurasia Motorsport	73	(Malaysia) Natasha Seatter		All
(Malaysia) Petronas Mofaz Racing	5	(Malaysia) Irfan Ilyas	R	All
(Malaysia) Petronas Mofaz Racing	6	(Malaysia) Freddie Ang	R	All
(Malaysia) Petronas Mofaz Racing	7	(Malaysia) Nabil Jeffri		All
(Malaysia) Petronas Mofaz Racing	8	(Malaysia) Hiqmar Danial	R	All
(India) Meco Racing	9	(India) Rahil Noorani		5
(India) Meco Racing	15	(India) Shashank Ravishankar		5
(India) Meco Racing	18	(India) Mohit Ahuja		5
(India) Meco Racing	42	(India) Sarosh Hataria		5
(Canada) Atlantic Racing Team	10	(Australia) Dylan Young		1, 4
(Canada) Atlantic Racing Team	12	(Germany) Calvin Seibl		4, 6
(Canada) Atlantic Racing Team	69	(Switzerland) Jimmy Antunes		1–2
(United States) EuroInternational	2	(Malaysia) Wei Ron Tan		6
(United States) EuroInternational	11	(Austria) Lucas Auer	R	All
(United States) EuroInternational	12	(Germany) Calvin Seibl		1–2
(United States) EuroInternational	30	(Italy) Lorenzo Camplese		5
(India) Meco's Ministry of Speed	24	(India) Vishnu Prasad		5
(India) Meco's Ministry of Speed	80	(India) Sandeep Kumar		5
(Malaysia) www.Meritus.GP	28	(India) Akhil Khushlani		5
(Malaysia) www.Meritus.GP	38	(Malaysia) Akash Nandy	R	All
(Malaysia) www.Meritus.GP	58	(India) Raj Bharath	R	All
(Malaysia) www.Meritus.GP	78	(Russia) Andrey Khrapov		1–2
(Malaysia) www.Meritus.GP	88	(Malaysia) Afiq Ikhwan		All
(South Korea) E-Rain Racing	61	(South Korea) Ju Won Seo		1
(Malaysia) Mahara	68	(Russia) Natalia Freidina		1

Icon	Class
R	Rookie Driver

== Race calendar and results ==
The series' provisional schedule was released on 11 February 2011. Latterly, the round scheduled for the Korea International Circuit on 6–8 May was moved to Guangdong on 13–14 August. The Guangdong round was later cancelled due to a typhoon, and was scheduled to be replaced with an additional round at the Buddh International Circuit on 25–27 November. However, the final meet was moved to the Sepang International Circuit after the Buddh International Circuit had to be closed for maintenance work.

Round		Circuit	Date	Pole position	Fastest lap	Winning driver	Winning team	Supporting
1	R1	(Malaysia) Sepang International Circuit	9 April	(Austria) Lucas Auer	(Austria) Lucas Auer	(Malaysia) Nabil Jeffri	(Malaysia) Petronas Mofaz Racing	Malaysian Grand Prix
1	R2	(Malaysia) Sepang International Circuit	10 April	(Austria) Lucas Auer	(Malaysia) Nabil Jeffri	(Austria) Lucas Auer	(United States) EuroInternational	Malaysian Grand Prix
2	R1	(Malaysia) Sepang International Circuit	28 May	(Austria) Lucas Auer	(Austria) Lucas Auer	(Austria) Lucas Auer	(United States) EuroInternational	Asian Festival of Speed
2	R2	(Malaysia) Sepang International Circuit	28 May	(Austria) Lucas Auer	(Austria) Lucas Auer	(Austria) Lucas Auer	(United States) EuroInternational	Asian Festival of Speed
2	R3	(Malaysia) Sepang International Circuit	29 May		(Switzerland) Jimmy Antunes	(Austria) Lucas Auer	(United States) EuroInternational	Asian Festival of Speed
2	R4	(Malaysia) Sepang International Circuit	29 May		(Austria) Lucas Auer	(Austria) Lucas Auer	(United States) EuroInternational	Asian Festival of Speed
3	R1	(Indonesia) Sentul International Circuit	23 July	(Malaysia) Afiq Ikhwan Yazid	(Malaysia) Afiq Ikhwan Yazid	(Malaysia) Afiq Ikhwan Yazid	(Malaysia) www.Meritus.GP	Asian Festival of Speed
3	R2	(Indonesia) Sentul International Circuit	23 July	(Malaysia) Afiq Ikhwan Yazid	(Malaysia) Afiq Ikhwan Yazid	(Malaysia) Afiq Ikhwan Yazid	(Malaysia) www.Meritus.GP	Asian Festival of Speed
3	R3	(Indonesia) Sentul International Circuit	24 July		(Malaysia) Afiq Ikhwan Yazid	(Malaysia) Afiq Ikhwan Yazid	(Malaysia) www.Meritus.GP	Asian Festival of Speed
3	R4	(Indonesia) Sentul International Circuit	24 July		(Austria) Lucas Auer	(Malaysia) Afiq Ikhwan Yazid	(Malaysia) www.Meritus.GP	Asian Festival of Speed
4	R1	(Singapore) Marina Bay Street Circuit	24 September	(Malaysia) Afiq Ikhwan Yazid	(Austria) Lucas Auer	(Malaysia) Afiq Ikhwan Yazid	(Malaysia) www.Meritus.GP	Singapore Grand Prix
4	R2	(Singapore) Marina Bay Street Circuit	25 September	(Malaysia) Afiq Ikhwan Yazid	(Austria) Lucas Auer	(Malaysia) Afiq Ikhwan Yazid	(Malaysia) www.Meritus.GP	Singapore Grand Prix
5	R1	(India) Buddh International Circuit	29 October	(Austria) Lucas Auer	(Austria) Lucas Auer	(Austria) Lucas Auer	(United States) EuroInternational	Indian Grand Prix
5	R2	(India) Buddh International Circuit	30 October	(Austria) Lucas Auer	(Austria) Lucas Auer	(Austria) Lucas Auer	(United States) EuroInternational	Indian Grand Prix
6	R1	(Malaysia) Sepang International Circuit	2 December	(Malaysia) Afiq Ikhwan Yazid	(Malaysia) Afiq Ikhwan Yazid	(Malaysia) Afiq Ikhwan Yazid	(Malaysia) www.Meritus.GP	Sepang 1000KM
6	R2	(Malaysia) Sepang International Circuit	2 December	(Malaysia) Afiq Ikhwan Yazid	(Malaysia) Afiq Ikhwan Yazid	(Malaysia) Afiq Ikhwan Yazid	(Malaysia) www.Meritus.GP	Sepang 1000KM
6	R3	(Malaysia) Sepang International Circuit	3 December		(Malaysia) Afiq Ikhwan Yazid	(Malaysia) Afiq Ikhwan Yazid	(Malaysia) www.Meritus.GP	Sepang 1000KM
6	R4	(Malaysia) Sepang International Circuit	3 December		(Malaysia) Afiq Ikhwan Yazid	(Malaysia) Afiq Ikhwan Yazid	(Malaysia) www.Meritus.GP	Sepang 1000KM

== Standings ==
- Points were awarded as follows:

	1	2	3	4	5	6	7	8	9	10	PP
Race 1	20	15	12	10	8	6	4	3	2	1	**1**

Pos	Driver	SEP (Malaysia)		SEP (Malaysia)				SEN (Indonesia)				SIN (Singapore)		IND (India)		SEP (Malaysia)				Pts
1	(Austria) Lucas Auer	**3**	**1**	**1**	**1**	1	1	2	2	2	2	2	9	**1**	**1**	2	2	2	3	292
2	(Malaysia) Afiq Ikhwan Yazid	2	2	3	Ret	3	6	**1**	**1**	1	1	**1**	**1**	10	2	**1**	**1**	1	1	285
3	(Malaysia) Nabil Jeffri	1	3	8	5	4	3	3	5	4	Ret	3	2	3	5	Ret	3	3	2	186
4	(Malaysia) Irfan Ilyas	11	6	2	2	2	2	Ret	DNS	9	Ret	Ret	Ret	4	3	3	5	4	6	135
5	(Australia) Duvashen Padayachee	5	7	5	4	Ret	Ret	5	7	5	4	4	3	5	6					100
6	(Malaysia) Freddie Ang	14	8	13	11	7	11	4	6	3	6	6	4	9	11	7	8	6	7	97
7	(Malaysia) Akash Nandy	12	9	Ret	3	13	5	11	3	6	3	5	Ret	13	7	5	7	7	Ret	91
8	(Malaysia) Hiqmar Danial	6	4	4	Ret	5	Ret	10	4	7	5	7	Ret	11	12	10	12	8	11	77
9	(Malaysia) Aaron Chang	4	5	9	10	6	8	6	10	11	7	Ret	DNS	7	8	9	Ret	9	8	67
10	(Malaysia) Natasha Seatter	7	11	11	12	8	Ret	7	8	Ret	Ret	9	5	15	14	8	10	10	9	40
11	(Malaysia) Pasin Lathouras	8	16	10	8	9	10	8	9	10	8	10	8	14	13					25
12	(Switzerland) Jimmy Antunes	9	17	6	7	11	4													22
13	(India) Raj Bharath	16	12	12	9	12	Ret	9	11	8	Ret	Ret	7	12	15	11	11	11	10	22
14	(Russia) Andrey Khrapov	13	10	7	6	10	9													15
15	(Australia) Dylan Young	15	13									8	6							9
guest drivers ineligible for points
	(Italy) Lorenzo Camplese													2	4					0
	(United Kingdom) Daniel Cammish															4	6	5	4	0
	(Malaysia) Wei Ron Tan															6	4	12	5	0
	(India) Akhil Khushlani													6	9					0
	(Germany) Calvin Seibl	10	15	DNS	Ret	Ret	7					11	Ret			12	9	DNS	Ret	0
	(India) Vishnu Prasad													8	10					0
	(South Korea) Ju Won Seo	17	14																	0
	(India) Rahil Noorani													16	17					0
	(India) Sarosh Hataria													DSQ	16					0
	(India) Shashank Ravishankar													17	20					0
	(India) Mohit Ahuja													18	19					0
	(Russia) Natalia Freidina	18	Ret																	0
	(India) Sandeep Kumar													Ret	18					0
Pos	Driver	SEP (Malaysia)		SEP (Malaysia)				SEN (Indonesia)				SIN (Singapore)		IND (India)		SEP (Malaysia)				Pts

Colour	Result
Gold	Winner
Silver	Second place
Bronze	Third place
Green	Points classification
Blue	Non-points classification
Blue	Non-classified finish (NC)
Purple	Retired, not classified (Ret)
Red	Did not qualify (DNQ)
Red	Did not pre-qualify (DNPQ)
Black	Disqualified (DSQ)
White	Did not start (DNS)
White	Withdrew (WD)
White	Race cancelled (C)
Blank	Did not practice (DNP)
Blank	Did not arrive (DNA)
Blank	Excluded (EX)

**Bold** – Pole
Italics – Fastest Lap

=== Teams' Championship ===
- Points were awarded on the same basis (excluding pole points) as the drivers' championship, but only to a team's first two cars at the end of the race. If a team was running just one car at a meeting, their points were doubled.

Pos	Team	SEP (Malaysia)		SEP (Malaysia)				SEN (Indonesia)				SIN (Singapore)		BUD (India)		SEP (Malaysia)				Pts
1	(United States) Eurointernational	24	40	40	40	40	40	30	30	30	30	30	6	40	40	30	30	30	24	574
2	(Malaysia) www.Meritus.GP	18	19	16	18	16	14	24	32	26	32	28	24	10	21	30	28	28	24	408
3	(Malaysia) Petronas Mofaz Racing	26	22	25	23	25	27	22	18	22	14	18	25	27	22	20	22	22	25	405
4	(Philippines) Eurasia Motorsport	18	14	11	13	14	7	14	10	12	14	13	20	18	12	10	6	10	14	230
5	(Canada) Atlantic Racing Team	4	5	12	8	6	20					8	12							75
-	(India) Meco Racing																			0
-	(India) Meco's Ministry of Speed																			0
-	(South Korea) E-Rain Racing																			0
-	(Malaysia) Mahara																			0
