= 2012 JK Racing Asia Series =

2012 JK Racing Asia Series season

Seasons
- ← 2011 none →

The 2012 JK Racing Asia Series season was the ninth season of the former Formula BMW Pacific series, and the second under its new name of the JK Racing Asia Series. The championship began on 27 May at Sepang and finished on 2 December in New Delhi after sixteen races held at six meetings.

== Teams and drivers ==
- All cars were BMW-engined Mygale FB02 chassis. Guest drivers in italics.

Team	No.	Driver	Class	Rounds
(United States) EuroInternational	1	(Malaysia) Nabil Jeffri		All
(United States) EuroInternational	2	(Malaysia) Weiron Tan		1–4
(United States) EuroInternational	2	(Malaysia) Hiqmar Danial		5
(United States) EuroInternational	2	(India) Aditya Patel		6
(United States) EuroInternational	3	(Malaysia) Irfan Ilyas		1–4
(United States) EuroInternational	3	(India) Akhil Khushlani		5
(United States) EuroInternational	4	(South Africa) Aston Hare	R	1–3, 5–6
(United States) EuroInternational	10	(Malaysia) Hiqmar Danial		4
(United States) EuroInternational	49	(India) Akhil Khushlani		6
(Canada) Atlantic Racing Team	5	(India) Raj Bharath		1
(Canada) Atlantic Racing Team	6	(India) Vishnu Prasad		1
(Canada) Atlantic Racing Team	7	(India) Sandeep Kumar		1
(Canada) Atlantic Racing Team	12	(Singapore) Calvin Seibl		1
(India) Meco Racing	5	(India) Raj Bharath		5
(India) Meco Racing	6	(India) Vishnu Prasad		5–6
(India) Meco Racing	14	(India) Chetan Korada		5
(India) Meco Racing	15	(India) Mahaveer Raghunathan		6
(India) Meco Racing	17	(Mexico) Diego Duez		6
(India) Meco Racing	19	(India) Akhil Rabindra		5–6
(United States) US Formula Project	9	(New Zealand) Chris Vlok		2
(United States) US Formula Project	10	(Malaysia) Calvin Wong		5
(United States) US Formula Project	10	(India) Amer Beg		6
(United States) US Formula Project	11	(India) Aditya Patel		2–3, 5
(United States) US Formula Project	33	(United Kingdom) Sean Walkinshaw		2
(United States) US Formula Project	37	(Malaysia) Ashraff Dewal		5–6
(United States) US Formula Project	49	(India) Akhil Khushlani		4
(Philippines) Eurasia Motorsport	10	(Malaysia) Danial Hidzir		1–3
(Philippines) Eurasia Motorsport	37	(Australia) Josh Raneri	R	1–3
(Philippines) Eurasia Motorsport	45	(Belgium) Alexis van de Poele		3
(United Kingdom) SWB Motorsport	24	(Norway) Tommy Ostgaard		4
(United Kingdom) SWB Motorsport	27	(United Kingdom) Jack Dex		4
(Malaysia) www.Meritus.GP	29	(Malaysia) Akash Nandy		1
(Malaysia) www.Meritus.GP	38	(Australia) Aidan Wright	R	1–3, 5–6
(Malaysia) www.Meritus.GP	68	(Thailand) Toby Earle	R	1–3, 5
(Malaysia) www.Meritus.GP	88	(Malaysia) Afiq Ikhwan		All
(Malaysia) www.Meritus.GP	95	(South Africa) Ernie van der Walt		2–3
(Malaysia) www.Meritus.GP	95	(New Zealand) Earl Bamber		5
(Malaysia) Mahara	45	(United Kingdom) Ollie Millroy		2
(Malaysia) Mahara	79	(France) Charly Bizalion		2
(Malaysia) Mahara	79	(New Zealand) Earl Bamber		3
(Malaysia) Mahara	79	(India) Karmnder Pal Singh		5

Icon	Class
R	Rookie Driver

== Race calendar and results ==
- The series schedule was released on 2 February 2012. The series visited European circuits for the first time, adding races at Le Castellet and Spa-Francorchamps. On 15 August 2012, it was announced that the series would visit Silverstone for a round supporting the British Formula 3 and British GT championships, instead of being part of the support package for the Singapore Grand Prix.

Round		Circuit	Date	Pole position	Fastest lap	Winning driver	Winning team	Supporting
1	R1	(Malaysia) Sepang International Circuit	26 May	(Malaysia) Nabil Jeffri	(Malaysia) Nabil Jeffri	(Malaysia) Nabil Jeffri	(United States) EuroInternational	Asian Festival of Speed
1	R2	(Malaysia) Sepang International Circuit	26 May	(Malaysia) Afiq Ikhwan	(Malaysia) Nabil Jeffri	(South Africa) Aston Hare	(United States) EuroInternational	Asian Festival of Speed
1	R3	(Malaysia) Sepang International Circuit	27 May		(South Africa) Aston Hare	(Malaysia) Nabil Jeffri	(United States) EuroInternational	Asian Festival of Speed
1	R4	(Malaysia) Sepang International Circuit	27 May		(South Africa) Aston Hare	(South Africa) Aston Hare	(United States) EuroInternational	Asian Festival of Speed
2	R1	(France) Circuit Paul Ricard, Le Castellet	1 July	(Malaysia) Afiq Ikhwan	(South Africa) Ernie van der Walt	(Malaysia) Nabil Jeffri	(United States) EuroInternational	Blancpain Endurance Series
2	R2	(France) Circuit Paul Ricard, Le Castellet	1 July	(South Africa) Aston Hare	(South Africa) Aston Hare	(Malaysia) Afiq Ikhwan	(Malaysia) www.Meritus.GP	Blancpain Endurance Series
3	R1	(Belgium) Circuit de Spa-Francorchamps	27 July	(Malaysia) Nabil Jeffri	(South Africa) Aston Hare	(Malaysia) Nabil Jeffri	(United States) EuroInternational	Spa 24 Hours
3	R2	(Belgium) Circuit de Spa-Francorchamps	28 July	(Malaysia) Nabil Jeffri	(Malaysia) Weiron Tan	(South Africa) Aston Hare	(United States) EuroInternational	Spa 24 Hours
4	R1	(United Kingdom) Silverstone Circuit	8 September	(Malaysia) Afiq Ikhwan	(Malaysia) Afiq Ikhwan	(Malaysia) Afiq Ikhwan	(Malaysia) www.Meritus.GP	British GT / British Formula 3
4	R2	(United Kingdom) Silverstone Circuit	9 September	(Malaysia) Afiq Ikhwan	(India) Akhil Khushlani	(Malaysia) Afiq Ikhwan	(Malaysia) www.Meritus.GP	British GT / British Formula 3
5	R1	(India) Buddh International Circuit	27 October	(Malaysia) Afiq Ikhwan	(India) Aditya Patel	(Malaysia) Afiq Ikhwan	(Malaysia) www.Meritus.GP	Indian Grand Prix
5	R2	(India) Buddh International Circuit	28 October	(Malaysia) Nabil Jeffri	(Malaysia) Nabil Jeffri	(South Africa) Aston Hare	(United States) EuroInternational	Indian Grand Prix
6	R1	(India) Buddh International Circuit	1 December	(South Africa) Aston Hare	(South Africa) Aston Hare	(South Africa) Aston Hare	(United States) EuroInternational	stand-alone round
6	R2	(India) Buddh International Circuit	1 December	(South Africa) Aston Hare	(Malaysia) Nabil Jeffri	(South Africa) Aston Hare	(United States) EuroInternational	stand-alone round
6	R3	(India) Buddh International Circuit	2 December		(Malaysia) Nabil Jeffri	(South Africa) Aston Hare	(United States) EuroInternational	stand-alone round
6	R4	(India) Buddh International Circuit	2 December		(Malaysia) Nabil Jeffri	(India) Aditya Patel	(United States) EuroInternational	stand-alone round

== Championship standings ==
- Points were awarded as follows:

	1	2	3	4	5	6	7	8	9	10	PP
All Race	20	15	12	10	8	6	4	3	2	1	**1**

Pos	Driver	SEP (Malaysia)				LEC (France)		SPA (Belgium)		SIL (United Kingdom)		IND (India)		IND (India)				Pts
1	(South Africa) Aston Hare	3	1	2	1	4	**3**	3	1			5	1	**1**	**1**	1	2	236
2	(Malaysia) Nabil Jeffri	**1**	6	1	2	1	2	**1**	**2**	2	3	2	**8**	10	7	3	Ret	223
3	(Malaysia) Afiq Ikhwan	2	**Ret**	4	11	**9**	1	Ret	6	**1**	**1**	**1**	4	3	2	6	Ret	174
4	(Australia) Aidan Wright	7	4	10	5	7	7	9	5			6	5	5	5	5	3	120
5	(Malaysia) Irfan Ilyas	9	3	6	4	5	4	2	4	7	4							93
6	(Malaysia) Hiqmar Danial	5	10	3	7	11	14	4	7	3	5	7	3					89
7	(Malaysia) Weiron Tan	6	5	13	6	3	8	Ret	3	4	6							67
8	(Malaysia) Akash Nandy	4	2	5	3													45
9	(South Africa) Ernie van der Walt					2	5	7	8									34
10	(Thailand) Toby Earle	10	8	11	12	12	11	10	12			9	11					27
11	(Australia) Josh Raneri	8	7	7	8	Ret	10	8	10									25
guest drivers ineligible for points
	(India) Aditya Patel					8	6	6	9			3	2	4	3	4	1	0
	(India) Akhil Khushlani									8	2	4	7	2	4	2	4	0
	(India) Vishnu Prasad	13	11	12	10							Ret	10	6	6	10	5	0
	(Norway) Tommy Ostgaard									5	7							0
	(New Zealand) Earl Bamber							5	Ret			Ret	Ret					0
	(India) Amer Beg													9	11	8	6	0
	(United Kingdom) Jack Dex									6	8							0
	(Malaysia) Calvin Wong											8	6					0
	(United Kingdom) Sean Walkinshaw					6	12											0
	(India) Akhil Rabindra											12	13	7	9	7	7	0
	(Mexico) Diego Duez													8	8	11	9	0
	(India) Raj Bharath	11	12	8	9							10	9					0
	(Malaysia) Ashraff Dewal											13	14	Ret	10	9	8	0
	(Singapore) Calvin Seibl	12	9	9	Ret													0
	(New Zealand) Chris Vlok					10	9											0
	(India) Mahaveer Raghunathan													Ret	Ret	12	10	0
	(Belgium) Alexis van de Poele							11	11									0
	(India) Karminder Pal Singh											11	12					0
	(France) Charly Bizalion					13	13											0
	(India) Chetan Korada											14	15					0
	(India) Sandeep Kumar	DNS	DNS	DNS	DNS													0
	(United Kingdom) Ollie Millroy					DNS	DNS											0
Pos	Driver	SEP (Malaysia)				LEC (France)		SPA (Belgium)		SIL (United Kingdom)		IND (India)		IND (India)				Pts

Colour	Result
Gold	Winner
Silver	Second place
Bronze	Third place
Green	Points classification
Blue	Non-points classification
Blue	Non-classified finish (NC)
Purple	Retired, not classified (Ret)
Red	Did not qualify (DNQ)
Red	Did not pre-qualify (DNPQ)
Black	Disqualified (DSQ)
White	Did not start (DNS)
White	Withdrew (WD)
White	Race cancelled (C)
Blank	Did not practice (DNP)
Blank	Did not arrive (DNA)
Blank	Excluded (EX)

**Bold** – Pole
Italics – Fastest Lap
