= Ross Jamison =

Hong Kong racing driver (born 1990)

- Traditional Chinese: 詹米信
Transcriptions

Ross Jamison
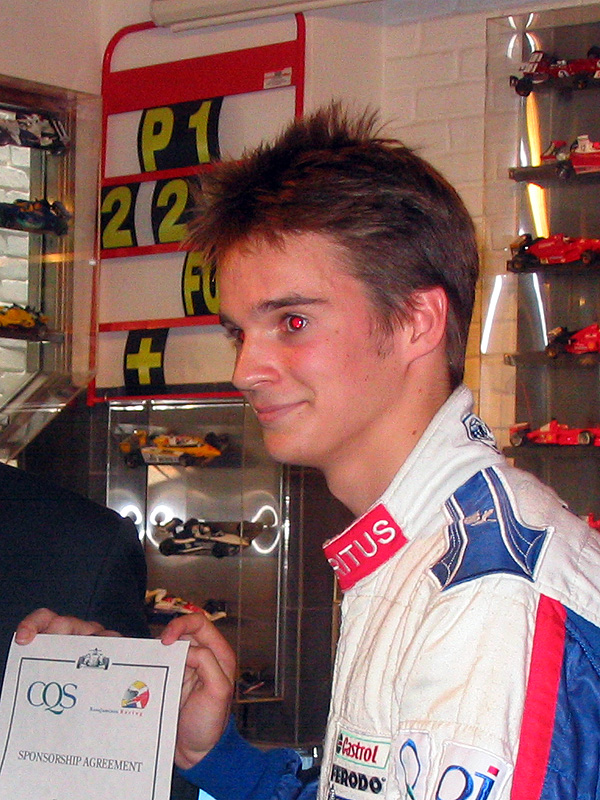
- Ross Jamison
- Nationality: Hong Kong
- Born: March 19, 1990 (age 36) Wales (United Kingdom)

Championship titles
- 2008: Formula BMW Pacific

Ross Jamison (born 19 March 1990 in Wales) is a former Hong Kong racing driver of British descent. He is the champion of the Formula BMW Pacific series in 2008.

Jamison started racing in Formula BMW in 2007. He was one of the five scholarship winners and finished second in the Rookie Cup and fifth overall.

Jamison continued in Formula BMW in 2008 and clinched the championship in Shanghai, with two races to spare.

Jamison took part in his first ever race in Macau in 2008. He qualified fourth and finished 16th after an accident with teammate Alexander Sims at Lisboa corner.

== Personal life ==
Jamison studied at King George V School in Kowloon, Hong Kong. His father is a captain with Cathay Pacific.

Sporting positions
Preceded by Jazeman Jaafar	Formula BMW Pacific; Champion; 2008	Succeeded by Rio Haryanto
