= 2017 Lamborghini Super Trofeo Asia =

International motor racing series

The 2017 Lamborghini Super Trofeo Asia was the sixth season of the Lamborghini Super Trofeo Asia. The season began on April 7 at Sepang International Circuit, and ended on November 17 with the World Final at the Imola Circuit. The series served as part of the support package to the Blancpain GT Series Asia.

The Pro class championship was dominated by Kei Cozzolino and Afiq Yazid who secured pole position in every event, as well as winning ten out of the twelve races, and secured the championship in the penultimate round in Shanghai. Similar domination occurred across the other categories with Rik Breukers and Nigel Farmer securing the Pro-Am class, Andrew Haryanto winning the Am championship with a round to spare and Supachai Weeraborwornpong winning the Lamborghini Cup.

== Calendar ==
The following circuits hosted at least one round of the 2017 championship.

Rnd.	Circuit	Date	Supporting
1	Sepang International Circuit, Selangor, Malaysia	7–9 April	Blancpain GT Series Asia; Formula Masters China
2	Buriram International Circuit, Buriram Province, Thailand	19–21 May	Blancpain GT Series Asia
3	Suzuka Circuit, Suzuka, Japan	22–25 June	Blancpain GT Series Asia; Japanese Formula 3 Championship
4	Fuji Speedway, Shizuoka Prefecture, Japan	18–20 August	Blancpain GT Series Asia
5	Shanghai International Circuit, Shanghai, China	22–24 September	Blancpain GT Series Asia; Formula Masters China
6	Imola Circuit, Emilia-Romagna, Italy	16–17 November	Lamborghini Super Trofeo World Finals
WF	Imola Circuit, Emilia-Romagna, Italy	18–19 November	Lamborghini Super Trofeo World Finals

== Teams and drivers ==
Team	No.	Drivers	Class	Rounds
(Japan) Emperor Racing	00	(Italy) Riccardo Agostini	P	4
(Japan) Emperor Racing	19	(Italy) Edoardo Liberati	P	3–5
(Japan) Emperor Racing	19	(Japan) Akihiko Nakaya	P	3
(Japan) Emperor Racing	19	(Japan) Toshihiro Kaneshi	P	4
(Japan) Emperor Racing	19	(Italy) Andrea Amici	P	5
(Japan) Emperor Racing	63	(Japan) Masami Kageyama	P	3–4
(Japan) Emperor Racing	63	(Japan) Toshihiro Kaneishi	P	3
(Japan) Emperor Racing	63	(Italy) Andrea Amici	P	4
(Japan) Emperor Racing	63	(Finland) Patrick Kujala	P	5
(Japan) Emperor Racing	63	(Denmark) Dennis Lind	P	5
(Germany) Leipert Motorsport	2	(Australia) Ben Gersekowski	P	All
(Germany) Leipert Motorsport	2	(United Kingdom) Rory Collingbourne	P	All
(Germany) Leipert Motorsport	33	(Finland) Mikko Eskelinen	PA	All
(Germany) Leipert Motorsport	33	(Canada) Maxx Ebenal	PA	All
(Italy) Team Lazarus	3	(Poland) Artur Janosz	P	All
(Italy) Team Lazarus	3	(Netherlands) Meindert van Buuren	P	1
(Italy) Team Lazarus	3	(United Kingdom) Toby Sowery	P	2–6
(China) FFF Racing Team	5	(United Kingdom) Jack Bartholomew	P	All
(China) FFF Racing Team	5	(India) Armaan Ebrahim	P	1–4
(China) FFF Racing Team	5	(Australia) Spike Goddard	P	5–6
(China) FFF Racing Team	50	(Germany) Carrie Schreiner	PA	All
(China) FFF Racing Team	50	(Australia) Spike Goddard	PA	1–4
(China) FFF Racing Team	50	(India) Armaan Ebrahim	PA	5
(China) FFF Racing Team	50	(Italy) Alberto Di Folco	PA	6
(Italy) X-One Racing Team	6	(Italy) Antonio D'Amico	P	1
(Italy) X-One Racing Team	6	(Brazil) Nicolas Costa	P	1
(Italy) X-One Racing Team	69	(Indonesia) Andrew Haryanto	Am	All
(Italy) X-One Racing Team	69	(Hong Kong) Vincent Wong	Am	1
(Italy) X-One Racing Team	69	(South Korea) Doyan Hwang	Am	2, 4–5
(Italy) X-One Racing Team	69	(Serbia) Miloš Pavlović	Am	6
(Japan) Clazzio Racing	11	(Japan) Kei Cozzolino	P	All
(Japan) Clazzio Racing	11	(Malaysia) Afiq Yazid	P	All
(Japan) Lamborghini Osaka Racing Team	12	(Japan) Shinji Nakano	P	3
(Japan) Lamborghini Osaka Racing Team	12	(Japan) Hiroyuki Iiri	P	3
(Japan) Proearth Racing Team	23	(Japan) Yūdai Uchida	P	4
(Japan) Proearth Racing Team	23	(Japan) Jun Tashiro	P	4
(San Marino) GDL Racing Team	37	(Netherlands) Rik Breukers	PA	1–2, 4–6
(San Marino) GDL Racing Team	37	(Hong Kong) Nigel Farmer	PA	All
(San Marino) GDL Racing Team	57	(Argentina) Andrés Josephsohn	Am	6
(Japan) Hojust Racing	38	(Japan) Takeshi Matsumoto	P	3–4
(Japan) Hojust Racing	38	(Japan) Toshiyuki Ochiai	P	3–4
(Japan) FPC Racing	55	(Japan) Ken Urata	Am	4
(Thailand) PSC Motorsport	57	(Thailand) Sarun Sereethoranakul	Am	1–2
(Thailand) PSC Motorsport	57	(Thailand) Saravut Sereethoranakul	Am	1–2
True Vision Motorsports Thailand	59	(Thailand) Suttiluck Buncharoen	Am	2–5
(China) JRM	60	(China) Stephen Hong	Am	2
(China) JRM	60	(China) Hao Bian	Am	2
(China) Top Speed Racing Team	66	(Chinese Taipei) George Chou	Am	All
(China) Top Speed Racing Team	66	(Hong Kong) Samson Chan	Am	All
(Japan) Car Guy Racing	74	(Japan) Yosuke Hayashi	Am	3–4
(Japan) Car Guy Racing	74	(Japan) Takeshi Kimura	Am	3–4
(Thailand) Siamgas Corse	77	(Thailand) Supachai Weeraborwornpong	LC	All
(United States) Toro Loco	81	(United States) Peter Aronson	LC	4
(Italy) Petri Corse	88	(Italy) Gabriele Murroni	LC	All
(Malaysia) Tedco Racing	89	(Singapore) Bill Ng	LC	1
(Malaysia) Arrows Racing	98	(Hong Kong) Michael Choi	LC	1
(Malaysia) Arrows Racing	98	(Hong Kong) Keith Chan	LC	1

Icon	Class
P	Pro Cup
PA	Pro-Am Cup
Am	Am Cup
LC	Lamborghini Cup
	Guest Starter

== Race results ==
Round		Circuit	Pole Position	Pro Winners	Pro-Am Winners	Am Winners	LC Winners
1	R1	(Malaysia) Sepang	(Japan) No. 11 Clazzio Racing	(Italy) No. 3 Team Lazarus	(San Marino) No. 37 GDL Racing Team	(Italy) No. 69 X-One Racing Team	(China) No. 77 Top Speed Racing Team
1	R1	(Malaysia) Sepang	(Japan) Kei Cozzolino (Malaysia) Afiq Yazid	(Poland) Artur Janosz (Netherlands) Meindert van Buuren	(Netherlands) Rik Breukers (Hong Kong) Nigel Farmer	(Indonesia) Andrew Haryanto	(Thailand) Supachai Weeraborwornpong
1	R2	(Malaysia) Sepang	(Japan) No. 11 Clazzio Racing	(Japan) No. 11 Clazzio Racing	(San Marino) No. 37 GDL Racing Team	(Italy) No. 69 X-One Racing Team	(Malaysia) No. 89 Tedco Racing
1	R2	(Malaysia) Sepang	(Japan) Kei Cozzolino (Malaysia) Afiq Yazid	(Japan) Kei Cozzolino (Malaysia) Afiq Yazid	(Netherlands) Rik Breukers (Hong Kong) Nigel Farmer	(Indonesia) Andrew Haryanto	(Singapore) Bill Ng
2	R1	(Thailand) Buriram	(Japan) No. 11 Clazzio Racing	(Japan) No. 11 Clazzio Racing	(China) No. 5 FFF Racing Team	(Italy) No. 69 X-One Racing Team	(China) No. 77 Top Speed Racing Team
2	R1	(Thailand) Buriram	(Japan) Kei Cozzolino (Malaysia) Afiq Yazid	(Japan) Kei Cozzolino (Malaysia) Afiq Yazid	(United Kingdom) Jack Bartholomew (India) Armaan Ebrahim	(Indonesia) Andrew Haryanto (South Korea) Doyun Hwang	(Thailand) Supachai Weeraborwornpong
2	R2	(Thailand) Buriram	(Japan) No. 11 Clazzio Racing	(Japan) No. 11 Clazzio Racing	(San Marino) No. 37 GDL Racing Team	(Thailand) No. 57 PSC Racing Team	(China) No. 77 Top Speed Racing Team
2	R2	(Thailand) Buriram	(Japan) Kei Cozzolino (Malaysia) Afiq Yazid	(Japan) Kei Cozzolino (Malaysia) Afiq Yazid	(Netherlands) Rik Breukers (Hong Kong) Nigel Farmer	(Thailand) Sarun Sereethoranakul (Thailand) Saravut Sereethoranakul	(Thailand) Supachai Weeraborwornpong
3	R1	(Japan) Suzuka	(Japan) No. 11 Clazzio Racing	(Japan) No. 11 Clazzio Racing	(Japan) No. 38 Hojust Racing	(Italy) No. 69 X-One Racing Team	(China) No. 77 Top Speed Racing Team
3	R1	(Japan) Suzuka	(Japan) Kei Cozzolino (Malaysia) Afiq Yazid	(Japan) Kei Cozzolino (Malaysia) Afiq Yazid	(Japan) Takeshi Matsumoto (Japan) Toshiyuki Ochiai	(Indonesia) Andrew Haryanto	(Thailand) Supachai Weeraborwornpong
3	R2	(Japan) Suzuka	(Japan) No. 11 Clazzio Racing	(Japan) No. 11 Clazzio Racing	(Japan) No. 38 Hojust Racing	(Italy) No. 69 X-One Racing Team	(China) No. 77 Top Speed Racing Team
3	R2	(Japan) Suzuka	(Japan) Kei Cozzolino (Malaysia) Afiq Yazid	(Japan) Kei Cozzolino (Malaysia) Afiq Yazid	(Japan) Takeshi Matsumoto (Japan) Toshiyuki Ochiai	(Indonesia) Andrew Haryanto	(Thailand) Supachai Weeraborwornpong
4	R1	(Japan) Fuji	(San Marino) No. 37 GDL Racing Team	(Japan) No. 11 Clazzio Racing	(Japan) No. 38 Hojust Racing	(Italy) No. 69 X-One Racing Team	(China) No. 77 Top Speed Racing Team
4	R1	(Japan) Fuji	(Netherlands) Rik Breukers (Hong Kong) Nigel Farmer	(Japan) Kei Cozzolino (Malaysia) Afiq Yazid	(Japan) Takeshi Matsumoto (Japan) Toshiyuki Ochiai	(Indonesia) Andrew Haryanto (South Korea) Doyun Hwang	(Thailand) Supachai Weeraborwornpong
4	R2	(Japan) Fuji	(Japan) No. 11 Clazzio Racing	(Japan) No. 11 Clazzio Racing	(San Marino) No. 37 GDL Racing Team	(Italy) No. 69 X-One Racing Team	(China) No. 77 Top Speed Racing Team
4	R2	(Japan) Fuji	(Japan) Kei Cozzolino (Malaysia) Afiq Yazid	(Japan) Kei Cozzolino (Malaysia) Afiq Yazid	(Netherlands) Rik Breukers (Hong Kong) Nigel Farmer	(Indonesia) Andrew Haryanto (South Korea) Doyun Hwang	(Thailand) Supachai Weeraborwornpong
5	R1	(China) Shanghai	(Japan) No. 11 Clazzio Racing	(Japan) No. 11 Clazzio Racing	(San Marino) No. 37 GDL Racing Team	(Italy) No. 69 X-One Racing Team	(China) No. 77 Top Speed Racing Team
5	R1	(China) Shanghai	(Japan) Kei Cozzolino (Malaysia) Afiq Yazid	(Japan) Kei Cozzolino (Malaysia) Afiq Yazid	(Netherlands) Rik Breukers (Hong Kong) Nigel Farmer	(Indonesia) Andrew Haryanto (South Korea) Doyun Hwang	(Thailand) Supachai Weeraborwornpong
5	R2	(China) Shanghai	(Japan) No. 11 Clazzio Racing	(Italy) No. 3 Team Lazarus	(San Marino) No. 37 GDL Racing Team	(Italy) No. 69 X-One Racing Team	(Italy) No. 88 Petri Corse
5	R2	(China) Shanghai	(Japan) Kei Cozzolino (Malaysia) Afiq Yazid	(Poland) Artur Janosz (United Kingdom) Toby Sowery	(Netherlands) Rik Breukers (Hong Kong) Nigel Farmer	(Indonesia) Andrew Haryanto (South Korea) Doyun Hwang	(Italy) Gabriele Murroni
6	R1	(Italy) Imola	(Italy) No. 69 X-One Racing Team	(Japan) No. 11 Clazzio Racing	(Italy) No. 69 X-One Racing Team	(San Marino) No. 57 GDL Racing Team	(China) No. 77 Top Speed Racing Team
6	R1	(Italy) Imola	(Indonesia) Andrew Haryanto (Serbia) Miloš Pavlović	(Japan) Kei Cozzolino (Malaysia) Afiq Yazid	(Indonesia) Andrew Haryanto (Serbia) Miloš Pavlović	(Argentina) Andrés Josephsohn	(Thailand) Supachai Weeraborwornpong
6	R2	(Italy) Imola	(Japan) No. 11 Clazzio Racing	(Japan) No. 11 Clazzio Racing	(Italy) No. 69 X-One Racing Team	(San Marino) No. 57 GDL Racing Team	(Italy) No. 88 Petri Corse
6	R2	(Italy) Imola	(Japan) Kei Cozzolino (Malaysia) Afiq Yazid	(Japan) Kei Cozzolino (Malaysia) Afiq Yazid	(Indonesia) Andrew Haryanto (Serbia) Miloš Pavlović	(Argentina) Andrés Josephsohn	(Italy) Gabriele Murroni

== Championship standings ==
=== Scoring system ===
Position	1st	2nd	3rd	4th	5th	6th	7th	8th	9th	10th	Pole
Points	15	12	10	8	6	5	4	3	2	1	1

=== Pro ===
Pos.	Driver	Team	(Malaysia) SEP		(Thailand) BUR		(Japan) SUZ		(Japan) FUJ		(China) SHA		(Italy) IMO		Pts
Pos.	Driver	Team	R1	R2	R1	R2	R1	R2	R1	R2	R1	R2	R1	R2	Pts
1	(Japan) Kei Cozzolino (Malaysia) Afiq Yazid	(Japan) Clazzio Racing	2	1	1	1	1	1	1	1	1	2	1	1	186
2	(Poland) Artur Janosz	(Italy) Team Lazarus	1	2	2	Ret	2	2	3	2	3	1	Ret	4	118
3	(United Kingdom) Jack Bartholomew	(China) FFF Racing Team	4	3	4	3	5	7	4	Ret	5	4	2	2	92
4	(United Kingdom) Toby Sowery	(Italy) Team Lazarus			2	Ret	2	2	3	2	3	1	Ret	4	91
5	(Australia) Ben Gersekowski (United Kingdom) Rory Collingbourne	(Germany) Leipert Motorsport	3	4	3	2	3	5	5	5			3	3	88
6	(India) Armaan Ebrahim	(China) FFF Racing Team	4	3	4	3	5	7	4	Ret					54
7	(Australia) Spike Goddard	(China) FFF Racing Team	6	5							5	4	2	2	49
8	(Italy) Edoardo Liberati	(Japan) Emperor Racing					6	4	Ret	3	4	3			41
9	(Japan) Masami Kageyama	(Japan) Emperor Racing					4	3	2	4					38
10	(Italy) Andrea Amici	(Japan) Emperor Racing							2	4	4	3			38
11	(Netherlands) Meindert van Buuren	(Italy) Team Lazarus	1	2											27
12	(Japan) Toshihiro Kaneishi	(Japan) Emperor Racing					4	3							18
13	(Japan) Akihiko Nakaya	(Japan) Emperor Racing					6	4							13
14	(Finland) Patrick Kujala (Denmark) Dennis Lind	(Japan) Emperor Racing									2	Ret			12
15	(Italy) Antonio D'Amico (Brazil) Nicolas Costa	(Italy) X-One Racing Team	5	6											11
16	(Germany) Carrie Schreiner	(China) FFF Racing Team	6	5											11
17	(Japan) Toshihiro Kaneshi	(Japan) Emperor Racing							Ret	3					10
18	(Japan) Shinji Nakano (Japan) Hiroyuki Iiri	(Japan) Lamborghini Osaka Racing Team					7	6							9
Pos.	Driver	Team	R1	R2	R1	R2	R1	R2	R1	R2	R1	R2	R1	R2	Pts
Pos.	Driver	Team	(Malaysia) SEP		(Thailand) BUR		(Japan) SUZ		(Japan) FUJ		(China) SHA		(Italy) IMO		Pts

=== Pro-Am ===
Pos.	Driver	Team	(Malaysia) SEP		(Thailand) BUR		(Japan) SUZ		(Japan) FUJ		(China) SHA		(Italy) IMO		Pts
Pos.	Driver	Team	R1	R2	R1	R2	R1	R2	R1	R2	R1	R2	R1	R2	Pts
1	(Netherlands) Rik Breukers (Hong Kong) Nigel Farmer	(San Marino) GDL Racing Team	1	1	2	1	2	Ret	3	1	1	1	3	2	151
2	(Finland) Mikko Eskelinen (Canada) Maxx Ebenal	(Germany) Leipert Motorsport	2	2	3	3	Ret	3	4	2	2	3	2	4	119
3	(Germany) Carrie Schreiner	(China) FFF Racing Team			1	2	Ret	2	2	4	3	2	4	3	100
4	(Australia) Spike Goddard	(China) FFF Racing Team			1	2	Ret	2	2	4					60
5	(Japan) Takeshi Matsumoto (Japan) Toshiyuki Ochiai	(Japan) Hojust Racing					1	1	1	3					57
6	(Indonesia) Andrew Haryanto (Serbia) Miloš Pavlović	(Italy) X-One Racing Team											1	1	31
7	(India) Armaan Ebrahim	(China) FFF Racing Team									3	2			22
8	(Italy) Alberto Di Folco	(China) FFF Racing Team											4	3	18
Pos.	Driver	Team	R1	R2	R1	R2	R1	R2	R1	R2	R1	R2	R1	R2	Pts
Pos.	Driver	Team	(Malaysia) SEP		(Thailand) BUR		(Japan) SUZ		(Japan) FUJ		(China) SHA		(Italy) IMO		Pts

=== Am ===
Pos.	Driver	Team	(Malaysia) SEP		(Thailand) BUR		(Japan) SUZ		(Japan) FUJ		(China) SHA		(Italy) IMO		Pts
Pos.	Driver	Team	R1	R2	R1	R2	R1	R2	R1	R2	R1	R2	R1	R2	Pts
1	(Indonesia) Andrew Haryanto	(Italy) X-One Racing Team	1	1	1	2	1	1	1	1	1	1			154
2	(Chinese Taipei) George Chou (Hong Kong) Samson Chan	(China) Top Speed Racing Team	2	3	4	Ret	4	3	2	4	3	3	2	2	113
3	(South Korea) Doyan Hwang	(Italy) X-One Racing Team			1	2			1	1	1	1			91
4	(Thailand) Suttiluck Buncharoen	True Vision Motorsports Thailand			3	3	3	4	5	3	2	2			78
5	(Thailand) Sarun Sereethoranakul (Thailand) Saravut Sereethoranakul	(Thailand) PSC Racing Team	3	2	2	1									50
6	(Hong Kong) Vincent Wong	(Italy) X-One Racing Team	1	1											32
7	(Argentina) Andrés Josephsohn	(San Marino) GDL Racing Team											1	1	30
8	(Japan) Yosuke Hayashi (Japan) Takeshi Kimura	(Japan) Car Guy Racing					2	2							25
9	(Japan) Yūdai Uchida (Japan) Jun Tashiro	(Japan) Proearth Racing Team							4	2					20
10	(Japan) Ken Urata	(Japan) FPC Racing							3	6					16
11	(China) Stephen Hong (China) Hao Bian	(China) JRM			5	4									14
Pos.	Driver	Team	R1	R2	R1	R2	R1	R2	R1	R2	R1	R2	R1	R2	Pts
Pos.	Driver	Team	(Malaysia) SEP		(Thailand) BUR		(Japan) SUZ		(Japan) FUJ		(China) SHA		(Italy) IMO		Pts

=== Lamborghini Cup ===
Pos.	Driver	Team	(Malaysia) SEP		(Thailand) BUR		(Japan) SUZ		(Japan) FUJ		(China) SHA		(Italy) IMO		Pts
Pos.	Driver	Team	R1	R2	R1	R2	R1	R2	R1	R2	R1	R2	R1	R2	Pts
1	(Thailand) Supachai Weeraborwornpong	(China) Top Speed Racing Team	1	3	1	1	1	1	1	1	1	2	1	2	177
2	(Italy) Gabriele Murroni	(Italy) Petri Corse	4	2	2	2	2	2	2	2	2	1	2	1	148
3	(Singapore) Bill Ng	(Malaysia) Tedco Corse	3	1											25
4	(Hong Kong) Michael Choi (Hong Kong) Keith Chan	(Malaysia) Arrows Racing	2	4											21
5	(United States) Peter Aronson	(United States) Toro Coro							3	3					20
Pos.	Driver	Team	R1	R2	R1	R2	R1	R2	R1	R2	R1	R2	R1	R2	Pts
Pos.	Driver	Team	(Malaysia) SEP		(Thailand) BUR		(Japan) SUZ		(Japan) FUJ		(China) SHA		(Italy) IMO		Pts
