= Nicola Marozzo =

Italian racing driver

Nicola Marozzo (born 1 March 1965) is a former Italian racing driver from Zumpano, near Cosenza. Gaining initial experience in Italian Formula Three from 1984 to 1986, he won an American Indycar Series event in Willow Springs in 1991 besting Robby Unser and Johnny Unser. Then he competed in three CART Indy Car World Series races for Euromotorsport in 1991 and 1992. He failed to finish any of his three races and scored no championship points. He attempted two more races in 1992 but failed to start in one and failed to qualify for another. In 1996, Marozzo was considered by the team of Bill Tempero to contest the first season of Indy Racing League starting from the 1996 Indy 200 at Walt Disney World, but ultimately the car was driven by Dave Kudrave. He also participated in the 1988 24 Hours of Le Mans. Marozzo won different races in Italy, on two and four wheels (with bike and car). In 2000, he won Rally of Sila for Campionato Italiano Terra (Gravel Rally) with a Mitsubishi Lancer Evo VI. Then he founded Zero Racing in Castrovillari with fellow racer Natalino Scarpelli, specializing on preparation of Mitsubishi Lancer E1, Renault Megane Trophy and more recently Wolf GB 08 Thunder. Between Zero Racing drivers there were "P.Buck", Carlo Curti, Federico Curti and Andrea Mosca.

== Racing record ==
=== American open-wheel racing ===
==== Indy Car World Series ====
Year	Team	1	2	3	4	5	6	7	8	9	10	11	12	13	14	15	16	17	Rank	Points	Ref
1991	Euromotorsport	SRF	LBH	PHX	INDY	MIL	DET	POR	CLE	MEA	TOR	MIC	DEN	VAN; 22	MDO; DNS	ROA; Wth	NAZ	LAG	47th	0	
1992	Euromotorsport	SRF; 19	PHX	LBH	INDY	DET	POR; 24	MIL	NHA	TOR	MIC	CLE	ROA	VAN	MDO	NAZ	LAG		51st	0	
