= JK Racing Asia Series =

Former Single-Seater Racing Championship

- Category: Single seaters
- Country: Asia
- Inaugural season: 2003
- Folded: 2012
- Drivers: 33 (2012)
- Teams: 8 (2012)
- Constructors: Mygale
- Engine suppliers: BMW
- Tyre suppliers: JK Tyre
- Last Drivers' champion: (South Africa) Aston Hare
- Last Teams' champion: (United States) EuroInternational
- Official website: afos.com

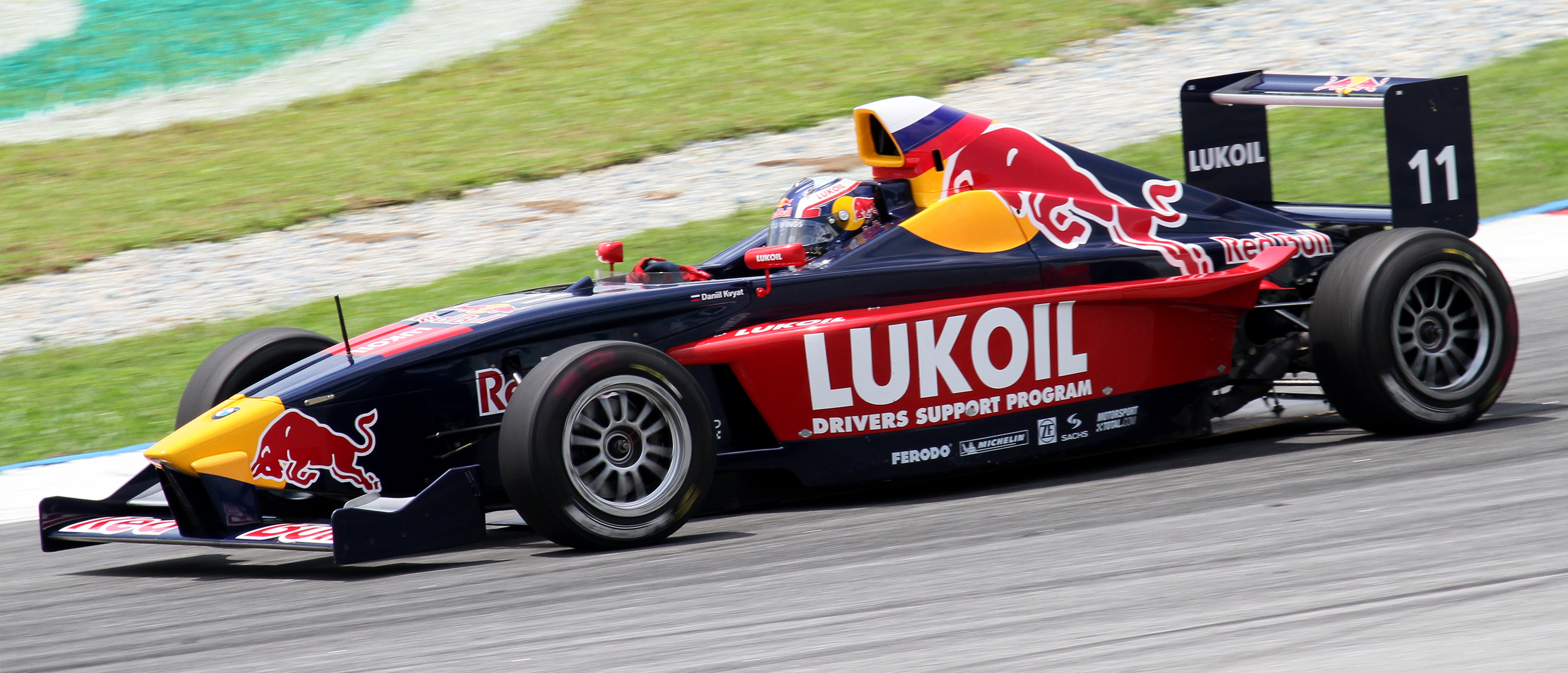
Daniil Kvyat during Race 1 of the 2010 Formula BMW Pacific season at Sepang International Circuit.

JK Racing Asia Series, formerly known as both Formula BMW Asia and Formula BMW Pacific, was a single-seater racing series based in Asia. Formula BMW Asia was created in 2003 as a replacement for Asian Formula 2000 and was under the management of Motorsport Asia Limited. It was renamed Formula BMW Pacific for the 2008 season. In 2011 the series lost BMW support but received JK Tyre sponsorship and was rebranded as JK Racing Asia Series.

== Event schedule ==
Each event in the championship was normally run to a three-day schedule. It comprises two races (in case of Formula One Grand Prix) or four races in standalone weekends, plus free practice and one 30-minute qualifying session.

== Circuits ==
Events were held at Sepang in Malaysia; Bira in Thailand; Sentul in Indonesia; and Shanghai, Zhuhai, Beijing in China, Macau and Singapore. It appeared on the support bill at the Malaysian, Chinese, Bahrain, Macau and Singapore Grand Prix. In 2011 the series visited Guangdong in China and the Indian Grand Prix circuit.

== JK Racing Asia Series Cars ==
All the teams in JK Racing Asia Series use the same FB02 cars manufactured by BMW AG that feature a Mygale chassis and a 1.2 litre BMW engine.

Specifications:

- Chassis: Mygale Carbon FIA F3 2002
- Dimension: 3975mm x 1740mm x 980mm
- Weight: 465 kg
- Engine: Naturally aspirated BMW K1200RS, 4 Cylinders 16 valves
- Displacement: 1171 cc
- Power output: 140 hp @ 9000rpm
- Fuel: Unleaded standard Super Plus petrol
- Gearbox: Hewland FTR 200, sequential, 6 forward speed, 1 reverse
- Front Suspension: Pushrod monodamper
- Rear Suspension: Pushrod twindamper
- Shock Absorbers: Sachs SP3
- Brake Disc: Solid disc
- Wheel Rims: OZ Racing 8 x 13 (front) 10x 13 (rear)
- Tyres: JK Tyre racing slicks and wet weather tyres
- Fuel Tank: 42 litres

== Race Weekend ==
A typical event in the championship is run over a course of three days comprising two races (as a supporting race for a Formula 1 weekend) or four races.

A free practice session or a multiple practice session may take place at the start of a race weekend.

A 20 to 30 minute qualifying session will be held prior to a race with only one driver qualifying a car. The grid positions for the first Race will be drawn in the order of the fastest time achieved by each Driver in the Qualifying Session. The grid positions for the second Race at each Meeting will be drawn in the order of the second fastest time achieved by each Driver in the Qualifying Session. Should two or more Drivers be credited with identical times, priority will be given to the one who set it first. At Meetings with more than two Races, the grid positions for the third Race will be determined by the classified results of the first Race and the grid positions for the fourth Race will be determined by the classified results of the second Race. The minimum criteria to qualifying for a race would be the fastest time set in qualifying + 10%.

A race lasts for approximately 25 minutes from the start of the race signal to the end of the race signal preceded by a Formation Lap. The distance is converted into a specific number of laps. If the leading driver has not achieved the defined race distance after 25 minutes have elapsed, the leader will be shown the chequered flag the next time they pass the Finish Line.

Classification is determined according to the FIA International Sporting Code. The winner is the driver who has covered the race distance in the shortest time at the completion of the race and after the consideration of any penalties. Only drivers that have covered at least 75% of the race distance will be classified. If the race is stopped before the total distance is run, full points will be awarded to the winners if more than 75% of the distance was covered. If only 50% – 75% of the race distance is covered, only 50% of the points will be awarded. No points are awarded if less than 50% of the distance is covered before the race is stopped.

== Points ==
After each race the following points will be awarded to eligible drivers listed as classified finishers in the final official classification as follows:

Points
1st	2nd	3rd	4th	5th	6th	7th	8th	9th	10th
20	15	12	10	8	6	4	3	2	1

After each Qualifying session, one point will be awarded to each Driver achieving Pole Position for a Race where the Grid positions are based on the results of the Qualifying session.

Points are awarded after the completion of any Judicial or Technical procedures and the Stewards have declared the results final.

== Seasons ==
=== 2011 ===
The 2011 season is the first one for the series after the name change to JK Racing Asia Series. The season is contested in 6 events in Malaysia (Sepang), Indonesia (Sentul), Singapore (Marina Bay), India (Greater Noida) with 3 being support races to Formula 1 events (Sepang, Marina Bay and Greater Noida). 7 teams participated in the season; Atlantic Racing Team, E-Rain Racing, Eurasia Motorsport, Eurointernational, Mahara, Petronas Mofaz Racing and www.Meritus.GP.

== Champions ==
Season	Series Name	Champion	Team Champion
2003	Formula BMW Asia	(China) Ho-Pin Tung	(Malaysia) Team Meritus
2004	Formula BMW Asia	(Hong Kong) Marchy Lee	(Malaysia) Team Meritus
2005	Formula BMW Asia	(Bahrain) Salman Al Khalifa	(South Korea) Team E-Rain
2006	Formula BMW Asia	(New Zealand) Earl Bamber	(Malaysia) Team Meritus
2007	Formula BMW Asia	(Malaysia) Jazeman Jaafar	(Malaysia) CIMB Qi-Meritus
2008	Formula BMW Pacific	(Hong Kong) Ross Jamison	(Malaysia) Team Meritus
2009	Formula BMW Pacific	(Indonesia) Rio Haryanto	(Malaysia) Questnet Team Qi-Meritus
2010	Formula BMW Pacific	(Singapore) Richard Bradley	(Philippines) Eurasia Motorsport
2011	JK Racing Asia Series	(Austria) Lucas Auer	(United States) EuroInternational
2012	JK Racing Asia Series	(South Africa) Aston Hare	(United States) EuroInternational

== See also ==
- JK Tyre National Racing Championship
