= EuroInternational =

European racing organization

(Italy) (United States) EuroInternational
- Founded: 1989
- Base: San Pietro Mosezzo, Italy
- Team principal(s): Antonio Ferrari
- Current series: European Le Mans Series
- Former series: European Formula 3 Superleague Formula; Atlantic Championship; IRL IndyCar Series; CART; Formula BMW Europe; Formula BMW USA; Italian Formula 3 Formula Abarth; JK Racing Asia Series; Formula Pilota China; German Formula 3
- Current drivers: (Netherlands) Glenn van Berlo (Spain) Xavier Lloveras (Belgium) Tom Cloet (France) Adrien Chila (Netherlands) Max Koebolt (Argentina) Marcos Siebert (Switzerland) Jérôme de Sadeleer (France) Louis Rousset (United Kingdom) Freddie Hunt (Italy) Jacopo Faccioni (Italy) Andrea Dromedari (Japan) Masaki Tanaka
- Teams' Championships: 2011 JK Racing Asia Series; 2012 JK Racing Asia Series
- Drivers' Championships: 2001 United States Formula 3 Championship (Gomida); 2011 JK Racing Asia Series (Auer); 2012 JK Racing Asia Series (Hare)
- Website: http://www.eurointernationalgroup.com/

EuroInternational is a racing organization (which includes Italian division EuroInternational Srl and American division EuroInternational Inc.) owned by Antonio Ferrari.

== History ==
Originally known as Euromotorsport, the team made its CART debut in 1989 with Jean-Pierre Frey at Phoenix. After Frey was unable to complete the USAC Rookie Orientation Program at Indianapolis, the team signed Davy Jones, who qualified for the Indianapolis 500 and finished in 7th place in his only appearance for the team that year.

The team went on to compete in the CART Indy Car World Series, often fielding a number of European pay drivers, from 1989 to 1994. The team's best finish was 4th place in the 1993 Detroit Grand Prix by Andrea Montermini. The team attempted to qualify its drivers for the Indianapolis 500 a number of times, but only succeeded three times, with Davy Jones in 1989 and 1993 and Mike Groff in 1992.

The team planned to enter Juri Nurminen in the 1995 CART season, but they did not appear at any of the races. By this time, the team was also racing in the IMSA series and at the 24 Hours of Le Mans, racing a Ferrari 333SP. During 1996, the team raced an Osella sports car in IMSA and entered the 1996 Indianapolis 500 as Osella USA, naming Russ Wicks as driver. However, they did not appear at the event due to a lack of sponsorship.

The team changed its name to EuroInternational in 1997 and moved to the IRL IndyCar Series and fielded a car in two races for Billy Roe, including the 1997 Indianapolis 500.

EuroInternational was away from racing for a few years before resurfacing in Formula Renault and Formula BMW USA. The team was rumored to return to Champ Car in 2006 but the team never came to fruition. In 2007, the team announced that it had purchased the assets of Alan Sciuto Racing and was preparing to compete in the 2008 Champ Car Atlantic Series with Italian driver Edoardo Piscopo. As the season began, the team fielded a pair of cars for Daniel Morad and Luis Schiavo rather than one for Piscopo.

In 2008 the team also began fielding the Superleague Formula teams for SC Corinthians and Atlético Madrid driven by Antônio Pizzonia and Andy Soucek.

They did not continue in either the Atlantic Championship or Superleague Formula in 2009.

== List of drivers ==
The following drivers made at least one race start in CART for Euromotorsport:

- (United States) Jeff Andretti (1994)
- (United States) Scott Atchison (1989)
- (United States) Tony Bettenhausen Jr. (1990)
- (United States) Steve Chassey (1992)
- (Switzerland) Andrea Chiesa (1993)
- (Italy) Guido Daccò (1989–1990, 1992)
- (Germany) Christian Danner (1992–1993)
- (France) Franck Fréon (1994)
- (Switzerland) Jean-Pierre Frey (1989)
- (United States) Mike Groff (1990–1992)
- (Colombia) Roberto Guerrero (1991)
- (United States) Davy Jones (1989, 1993)
- (United States) David Kudrave (1993)
- (Philippines) Jovy Marcelo (1992)
- (Italy) Andrea Montermini (1993)
- (Italy) Nicola Marozzo (1991–1992)
- (Finland) Tero Palmroth (1989, 1992)
- (Italy) Vinicio Salmi (1992)
- (Italy) Franco Scapini (1991)
- (United States) George Snider (1992)
- (United States) Jeff Wood (1991–1994)
- (Italy) Alessandro Zampedri (1994)

== Results ==
=== Complete CART Indy Car World Series results ===
(key)

Year	Chassis	Engine	Drivers	No.	1	2	3	4	5	6	7	8	9	10	11	12	13	14	15	16	17
1989					PHX	LBH	INDY	MIL	DET	POR	CLE	MEA	TOR	MCH	POC	MDO	ROA	NAZ	LAG		
1989	Lola T88/00	Cosworth DFX V8t	(Switzerland) Jean-Pierre Frey	50	21		Wth	DNQ	DNQ												
1989	Lola T88/00	Cosworth DFX V8t	(United States) Davy Jones	50			7														
1989	Lola T88/00	Cosworth DFX V8t	(United States) Scott Atchison	50						17	27	14									
1989	Lola T88/00	Cosworth DFX V8t	(Italy) Guido Daccò	50										13		26	26	12	26		
1989	Lola T88/00	Cosworth DFX V8t	(Finland) Tero Palmroth	50											25						
1990					PHX	LBH	INDY	MIL	DET	POR	CLE	MEA	TOR	MCH	DEN	VAN	MDO	ROA	NAZ	LAG	
1990	Lola T88/00	Cosworth DFX V8t	(Italy) Guido Daccò	50	12	DNQ	DNQ														
1990	Lola T88/00	Cosworth DFX V8t	(United States) Rich Vogler	50			DNQ														
1990	Lola T88/00	Cosworth DFX V8t	(United States) Mike Groff	50			DNQ														
1990	Lola T89/00	Cosworth DFS V8t	(United States) Mike Groff	50			DNQ		15	23	9	26									
1990	Lola T90/00	Cosworth DFS V8t	(United States) Mike Groff	50									11	11	14	22	10	17	7	15	
1991					SFR	LBH	PHX	INDY	MIL	DET	POR	CLE	MEA	TOR	MCH	DEN	VAN	MDO	ROA	NAZ	LAG
1991	Lola T90/00	Cosworth DFS V8t	(Italy) Tony de Tommaso	42												DNQ					
1991	Lola T90/00	Cosworth DFS V8t	(Italy) Nicola Marozzo	42													22	DNS	DNQ		
1991	Lola T91/00	Cosworth DFS V8t	(Italy) Franco Scapini	42	11																
1991	Lola T91/00	Cosworth DFS V8t	(United States) Mike Groff	50	8	23	16	24	18	22	11	10	11								
1991	Lola T91/00	Cosworth DFS V8t	(Colombia) Roberto Guerrero	50										18							
1992					SFR	PHX	LBH	INDY	DET	POR	MIL	NHA	TOR	MCH	CLE	ROA	VAN	MDO	NAZ	LAG	
1992	Lola T90/00	Cosworth DFS V8t	(Italy) Vinicio Salmi	42						18			20			15	20			24	
1992	Lola T90/00	Cosworth DFS V8t	(United States) Steve Chassey	42							22	19		19							
1992	Lola T90/00	Cosworth DFS V8t	(Finland) Tero Palmroth	42											26						
1992	Lola T90/00	Cosworth DFS V8t	(United States) Jeff Wood	42														13			
1992	Lola T90/00	Cosworth DFS V8t	(Italy) Guido Daccò	42															23		
1992	Lola T91/00	Cosworth DFS V8t	(Italy) Nicola Marozzo	42	19																
1992	Lola T91/00	Cosworth DFS V8t	(Italy) Nicola Marozzo	50						24											
1992	Lola T91/00	Cosworth DFS V8t	(Philippines) Jovy Marcelo	50	14	19	19	DNQ													
1992	Lola T91/00	Cosworth DFS V8t	(Germany) Christian Danner	50					18				16		16	16	21	19	13	20	
1992	Lola T91/00	Cosworth DFS V8t	(United States) Mike Groff	50							14	13									
1992	Lola T91/00	Cosworth DFS V8t	(United States) George Snider	50										24							
1993					SFR	PHX	LBH	INDY	MIL	DET	POR	CLE	TOR	MCH	NHA	ROA	VAN	MDO	NAZ	LAG	
1993	Lola T91/00	Cosworth DFS V8t	(Switzerland) Andrea Chiesa	42	26																
1993	Lola T91/00	Cosworth DFS V8t	(United States) Jeff Wood	42		DNQ	20		DNQ	DNQ	28	17	28			27	15	DNQ		DNQ	
1993	Lola T91/00	Cosworth DFS V8t	(United States) Jeff Wood	50										20	24				DNS		
1993	Lola T92/00	Chevrolet 265A V8t	(Italy) Andrea Montermini	50	25					4			27				19				
1993	Lola T92/00	Chevrolet 265A V8t	(United States) David Kudrave	50		8	27		24		23							23			
1993	Lola T92/00	Chevrolet 265A V8t	(United States) David Kudrave	42										12	23				14		
1993	Lola T92/00	Chevrolet 265A V8t	(United States) Davy Jones	50				15													
1993	Lola T92/00	Chevrolet 265A V8t	(Germany) Christian Danner	50								25				11				26	
1994					SFR	PHX	LBH	INDY	MIL	DET	POR	CLE	TOR	MCH	MDO	NHA	VAN	ROA	NAZ	LAG	
1994	Lola T93/00	Ilmor 265C V8t	(Italy) Alessandro Zampedri	50	22		22														
1994	Lola T92/00	Ilmor 265A V8t	(Italy) Giovanni Lavaggi	50						DNQ											
1994	Lola T92/00	Ilmor 265A V8t	(United States) Jeff Wood	50					Wth		29	23	28	17	DNQ	DNQ			DNQ	DNQ	
1994	Lola T92/00	Ilmor 265A V8t	(France) Franck Fréon	50													DNQ	29			
1994	Lola T92/00	Ilmor 265A V8t	(United States) David Kudrave	50		DNQ	DNQ														
1994	Lola T92/00	Ilmor 265A V8t	(United States) David Kudrave	55	DNQ																
1994	Lola T93/00	Ilmor 265C V8t	(United States) Jeff Andretti	55		17															

=== Complete Indy Racing League results ===
(key)

Year	Chassis	Engine	Drivers	No.	1	2	3	4	5	6	7	8	9	10
1996–1997					NHA	LSV	WDW	PHX	INDY	TXS	PPIR	CLT	NHA	LSV
1996–1997	Dallara IR-7	Oldsmobile Aurora V8	(United States) Billy Roe	50				15	22	Wth				

=== Complete Atlantic Championship results ===
(key)

Year	Car	Drivers	No.	1	2	3	4	5	6	7	8	9	10	11	D.C.	Points
2008	Swift-Mazda Cosworth			LBH	LAG	MTT	EDM1	EDM2	ROA1	ROA2	TRR	NJ	UTA	ATL		
2008	Swift-Mazda Cosworth	(Venezuela) Luis Schiavo	46	18	Ret	DNS	16	14	10	12	16			7	20th	60
2008	Swift-Mazda Cosworth	(Canada) Daniel Morad	70	6	9	Ret	11	8	Ret	9	6				12th	95

=== Superleague Formula ===
Year	Car	Teams	Races	Wins	Poles	Fast laps	Points	T.C.
2008	Panoz DP09-Menard	(Brazil) SC Corinthians	12	0	0	1	264	9th
2008	Panoz DP09-Menard	(Spain) Atlético Madrid	9	0	0	3	132	18th

=== 24 Hours of Le Mans ===
Year	Entrant	No.	Car	Drivers	Class	Laps	Pos.	Class Pos.
1995	(United States) Euromotorsport Racing Inc.	1	Ferrari 333 SP	(France) René Arnoux (United States) Jay Cochran (Italy) Massimo Sigala	WSC	7	DNF	DNF
2020	(United States) EuroInternational	11	Ligier JS P217-Gibson	(Belgium) Christophe d'Ansembourg (France) Erik Maris (France) Adrien Tambay	LMP2	26	DNF	DNF
