= Goddard (surname) =

Goddard is a surname of Norman origin, found in England and France. It is derived from the personal name Golhard. Recorded variants include Godard and Godart in England; Goudard and Godar in France; Gotthard, Godehard and Goddert in Germany; and Goedhard and Goedhart in Holland.

Notable people with the name include:

== Arts and entertainment ==
=== Film, television, and theater ===
- Alf Goddard (1897–1981), English film actor
- Andy Goddard (born 1968), British film director and screenwriter
- Charles W. Goddard (1879–1951), American playwright and screenwriter
- Drew Goddard (born 1975), American screenwriter, director and producer
- Jim Goddard (1936–2013), English film and television director
- Liza Goddard (born 1950), British television presenter
- Paulette Goddard (1911–1990), American actress
- Trisha Goddard (born 1957), British television presenter

=== Literature and journalism ===
- Julia Goddard (1825–1896), British children's writer and animal welfare campaigner
- Mary Katharine Goddard (1738–1816), American publisher and printer
- Robert Goddard (novelist) (born 1954), British novelist
- Sarah Updike Goddard (c. 1701–1770), American publisher and printer
- William Goddard (publisher) (1740–1817), American publisher and printer
- Neville Goddard (1905–1972), Barbadian writer and mystic
- Simon Goddard (born 1971), British author and music journalist

=== Music ===
- Goddard. (born Andrew Goddard, 1998), British musician
- Adam Ant (born Stuart Leslie Goddard, 1954), British pop singer
- Alexa Goddard (born 1990), British R&B singer
- Geoff Goddard (1938–2000), English musician and songwriter
- George "Sonny" Goddard (1924–1988), Trinidadian steelpan enthusiast
- Joe Goddard (born 1979), British musician, Hot Chip

=== Other arts and entertainment ===
- Anna-Marie Goddard (born 1970), Dutch-born model for adult publications
- Gary Goddard (born 1954), American film producer and director; theme park designer
- Giles Goddard (born 1971), English video game programmer based in Japan
- George William Goddard (1889–1987), American air force general and aerial photography pioneer

== Politics, law and the military ==
- Ambrose Goddard (c. 1727–1815), English politician
- Ambrose Goddard (born 1819) (1819–1898), English politician
- Daniel Ford Goddard (1850–1922), English politician
- Frederick Norton Goddard (1861–1905), American politician from New York
- Guybon Goddard (1612–1671), English lawyer, politician and diarist
- John Goddard (1730–1816), American Wagon-Master General
- Rayner Goddard, Baron Goddard (1877–1971), Lord Chief Justice of England and Wales
- Robert Hale Ives Goddard (1837–1916), American industrialist and politician from Rhode Island
- Samuel Pearson Goddard Jr. (1919–2006), American politician from Arizona
- Theodore Goddard (1879–1952), British solicitor to Wallis Simpson during the Edward VIII abdication crisis
- Thomas Goddard (jurist) (1937–2019), New Zealand jurist
- Thomas Goddard (MP) (1777–1814), English politician

== Science and engineering ==
- Andrew Goddard (born 1967), British doctor
- Calvin Hooker Goddard (1891–1955), American scientist, "the father of forensic ballistics"
- Cliff Goddard (born 1953), Australian linguist
- David R. Goddard (1908–1985), American plant physiologist and scientific administrator, son of Pliny
- Dick Goddard (1931–2020), American meteorologist
- Ebenezer Goddard (1816–1882), British businessman and engineer
- Ernest James Goddard (1883–1948), Australian professor of biology
- Henry H. Goddard (1866–1957), American psychologist and eugenicist
- Ives Goddard (born 1941), American linguist
- Lisa Goddard (1966–2022), American climatologist
- Michael Goddard, Australian animal genetics researcher
- Peter Goddard (physicist) (born 1945), British mathematical physicist
- Pliny Earle Goddard (1869–1928), American linguist, father of David
- Robert H. Goddard (1882–1945), American rocket scientist
- Stacie E. Goddard, American political scientist
- William Goddard (engineer) (1913–1997), American engineer
- William Andrew Goddard III (born 1937), American theoretical chemist

== Sports ==
- Brendon Goddard (born 1985), Australian footballer
- Dicky Goddard (1879–1949), English rugby player
- Hope Goddard Iselin (1868–1970), American sportswoman
- Jamie Goddard (born 1972), Australian rugby player
- Jim Goddard (basketball) (born c. 1930), American basketball coach
- Joe Goddard (boxer) (1857–1903), Australian boxer
- John Goddard (cricketer) (1919–1987), Barbadian cricketer
- John Goddard (footballer) (born 1993), English footballer
- Jordan Goddard (born 1993), English footballer
- Paul Goddard (footballer) (born 1959), English footballer
- Peter Goddard (motorcyclist) (born 1964), Australian motorcycle road racer
- Richard Goddard (footballer) (born 1978), Trinidad and Tobago football player
- Richard Goddard (rugby league) (born 1974), English rugby player
- Richard Goddard-Crawley (born 1978), British football player
- Spike Goddard (born 1992), Australian racing driver
- Tom Goddard (1900–1966), English cricketer
- Tracy Goddard (born 1969), British runner
- Trevor Goddard (cricketer) (1931–2016), South African cricketer
- Trevor Goddard (1962–2003), English actor and boxer

== Others ==
- Goddard family, in the English counties of Wiltshire, Hampshire, and Berkshire, between the Tudor period and the late modern era
- John Goddard (disambiguation), multiple people
- Nichola Goddard (1980–2006), Canadian army captain
- Thomas Goddard (priest) (1674–1731), Canon of Windsor

== See also ==
- Goddard (given name)
- Godard (surname)
