= Godward =

Godward is a surname. Notable people with the surname include:

- Ernest Godward (1869–1936), English inventor and engineer
- John William Godward (1861–1922), English painter
- William Godward (born 1984), Australian sports shooter

== See also ==
- Goddard (surname)
