= Godard (surname) =

Godard is a surname. Notable people with the name include:

- Godard (composer) (fl. 1536 – c. 1560), French composer of the Renaissance
- Abel Godard (1835–1891), New York politician
- Agnès Godard, French cinematographer
- André Godard (1881–1965), French Iranologist
- Anne Godard (born 1971), French writer
- Benjamin Godard (1849–1895), French composer best known for his opera Jocelyn and salon music
- Christian Godard (born 1932), French comic artist
- Emile St. Godard (1905–1948), Canadian dog sled racer
- Eric Godard (born 1980), retired Canadian NHL player
- George S. Godard (1865–1936), American librarian
- Hélène Godard, French former competitive figure skater
- Henri Godard (born 1937), French literary scholar and critic
- Jean-Luc Godard (1930–2022), French-Swiss filmmaker
- Joel Godard (born 1938), announcer for Late Night with Conan O'Brien
- Michael Godard (born 1963), American artist
- Ronald D. Godard (born 1942), American ambassador
- Vic Godard, British musician
- Yves Godard (1911–1975), French soldier

== See also ==
- Saint Godard (disambiguation)
- Godart, surname
- Goddard (surname)
