= George Goddard =

George Goddard may refer to:

- George Goddard (cricketer) (born 1938), Scottish cricketer
- George Goddard (footballer) (1903–1987), English-born footballer of the 1920s and 1930s
- George Goddard (Mormon) (1815–1899), English Mormon pioneer and leader in The Church of Jesus Christ of Latter-day Saints
- George William Goddard (1889–1987), United States Air Force general
- George "Sonny" Goddard (1924–1988), Trinidadian steelpan musician
- George Bouverie Goddard (1832–1886), British sporting and animal painter and illustrator
