= Godart =

Godart is the surname of the following people:

- Godart (composer) (fl. 1536 – c. 1560), French composer of the Renaissance
- Jean-Baptiste Godart (1775–1825), French entomologist
- Justin Godart (1871–1956), French politician
- Louis Godart (born 1945), Italian historian
- Maxime Godart (born 1999), French actor
- Pascal Godart, French classical pianist
- Frédéric Godart, French researcher and sociologist

== See also ==
- Godard (surname)
