= John Godard =

John Godard may refer to:

- John Godard (died 1392), MP for Yorkshire
- John Godard (fl. 1377–1402), MP for Sandwich

== See also ==
- John Goddard (disambiguation)
