= Lucas Auer =

Austrian racing driver (born 1994)

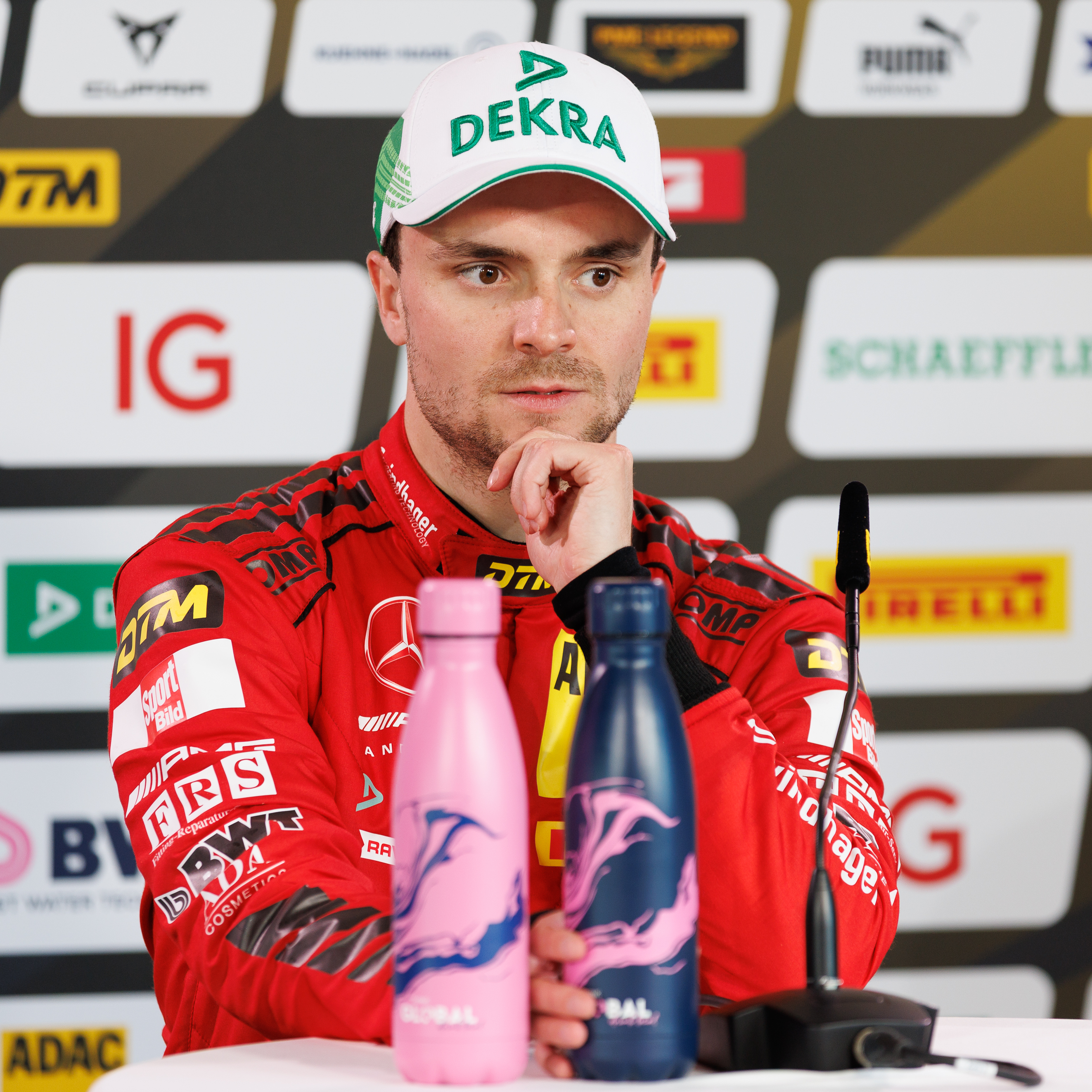
- Auer in 2025
- Nationality: (Austria) Austrian
- Born: 11 September 1994 (age 32) Tyrol, Austria
- Relatives: Gerhard Berger (uncle)

Deutsche Tourenwagen Masters career
- Debut season: 2015
- Current team: Mercedes-AMG Team Landgraf
- Categorisation: FIA Gold (until 2022); FIA Platinum (2023–)
- Car number: 22
- Former teams: ART Grand Prix, Mücke Motorsport, HWA Team, Team RMR, HTP Winward Motorsport
- Starts: 188
- Championships: 0
- Wins: 13
- Poles: 14
- Fastest laps: 7
- Best finish: 2nd in 2022, 2025

Previous series
- 2019 2012-14 2012-13 2012 2011 2011: Super Formula; FIA F3 Championship; Toyota Racing Series; German Formula Three; JK Racing Asia Series; Formula Pilota China

Championship titles
- 2026 2024 2011: GTWC Europe - Endurance Cup; GTWC Europe - Sprint Cup; JK Racing Asia Series

Lucas Auer (born 11 September 1994) is an Austrian racing driver. He currently drives for Mercedes-AMG in DTM and the GT World Challenge Europe, where he won the overall and sprint championship in 2024. He is the nephew of former Formula 1 driver Gerhard Berger, and spent one season in Super Formula as a Red Bull Junior Team member.

== Early career ==
In October 2011, Auer won the 2011 JK Racing Asia Series season championship. He then tested a F3 Euroseries car at Valencia, with his 52-year-old uncle Gerhard Berger looking on.

On 25 August 2012, Auer, driving for Van Amersfoort Racing, won the 21st round of the German F3 season, held at the 4.534-kilometre Lausitzring. He finished second in the Championship.

After the four season Mercedes Deutsche Tourenwagen Masters campaign, in December 2018 the Red Bull Junior Team announced that Auer would join the junior program from the 2019 season and he was confirmed to race the Super Formula Championship 2019 season. Auer was released from the program after a single season by "mutual consent", with team manager Helmut Marko citing Auer's age and lack of FIA Super License points as reasons for their split. He would return to DTM the next year with BMW Team RMR.

== Personal life ==
Auer is the nephew of former Benetton, McLaren and Ferrari F1 driver Gerhard Berger. He is the son of Berger's sister Claudia, who runs a transport company in Wörgl in Tyrol – not far from Berger's own family business.

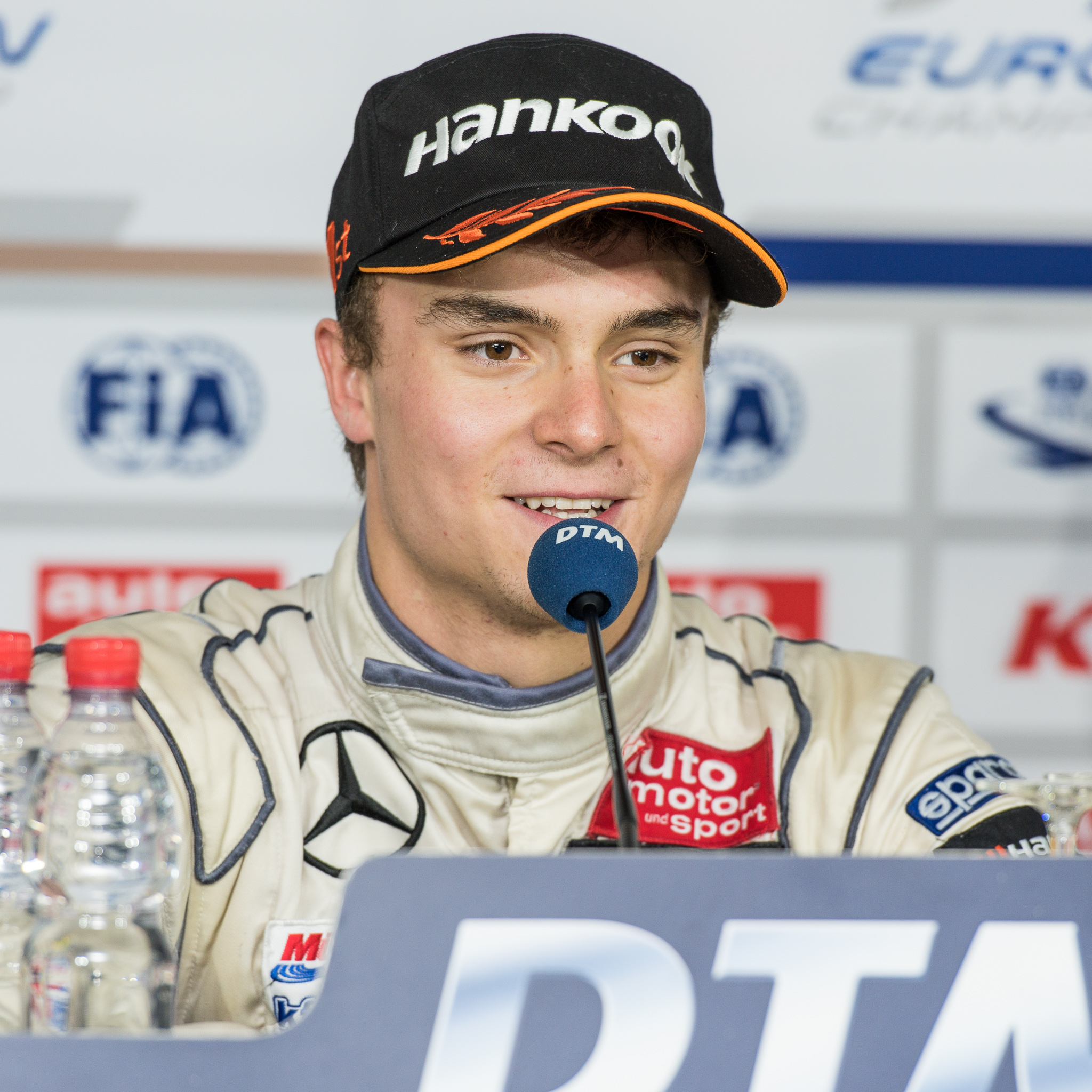
Lucas Auer at Hockenheimring, 2014

== Racing record ==
=== Career summary ===
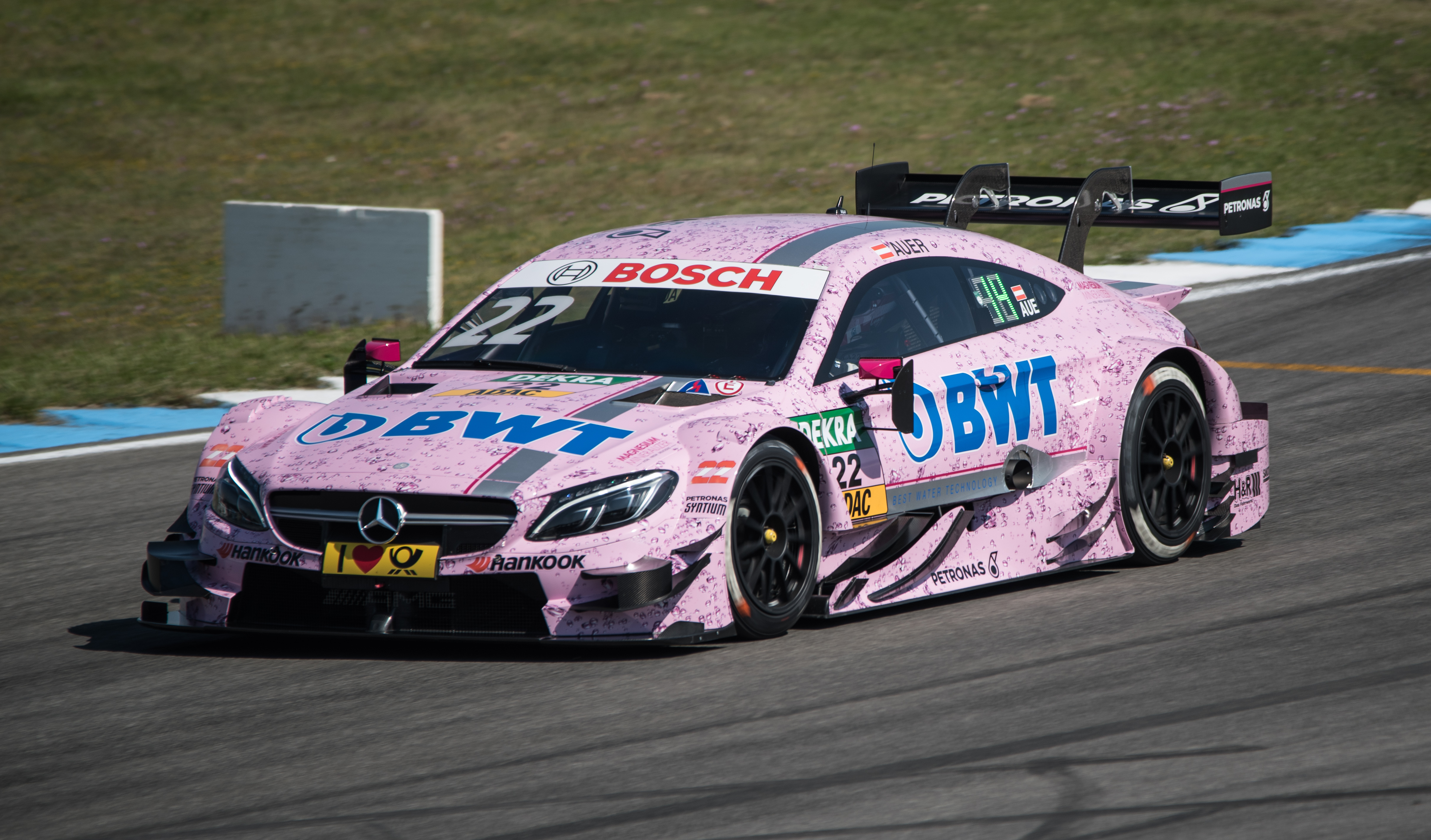
Auer in DTM in 2016.

Season	Series	Team	Races	Wins	Poles	F/Laps	Podiums	Points	Position
2011	JK Racing Asia Series	EuroInternational	18	7	6	9	17	292	**1st**
2012	German Formula 3 Championship	Van Amersfoort Racing	27	2	2	4	11	298	**2nd**
2012	FIA Formula 3 European Championship	Van Amersfoort Racing	2	0	0	0	0	0	NC‡
2012	Toyota Racing Series	Giles Motorsport	15	0	2	0	2	589	6th
2013	FIA Formula 3 European Championship	Prema Powerteam	30	1	0	2	8	277	4th
2013	Toyota Racing Series	Giles Motorsport	15	2	3	4	6	797	**3rd**
2013	FIA World Endurance Championship - LMP2	Lotus	1	0	0	0	0	0	NC
2014	FIA Formula 3 European Championship	kfzteile24 Mücke Motorsport	33	3	1	2	13	365	4th
2014	Macau Grand Prix	kfzteile24 Mücke Motorsport	1	0	0	0	1	—N/a	**2nd**
2014	FIA World Endurance Championship - LMP1	Lotus	3	0	0	0	0	1	24th
2015	Deutsche Tourenwagen Masters	ART Grand Prix	17	0	1	0	0	18	23rd
2016	Deutsche Tourenwagen Masters	Mercedes-Benz DTM Team Mücke	18	1	2	0	2	68	12th
2017	Deutsche Tourenwagen Masters	Mercedes-AMG Motorsport BWT	18	3	3	0	4	136	6th
2017	ADAC GT Masters	BWT Mücke Motorsport	4	1	0	0	2	55	17th
2017	Formula One	Sahara Force India F1 Team	Test driver						
2018	Deutsche Tourenwagen Masters	SILBERPFEIL Energy Mercedes-AMG Motorsport	20	0	3	2	4	121	7th
2018	Blancpain GT Series Endurance Cup	Strakka Racing	1	0	0	0	0	4	42nd
2018	International GT Open	Drivex School	2	0	0	0	1	0	NC‡
2018	International GT Open - Pro-Am	Drivex School	2	1	0	0	1	0	NC‡
2019	Super Formula	B-Max Racing with Motopark	7	0	0	1	1	14	9th
2019	Toyota Racing Series	M2 Competition	15	1	3	1	7	270	**3rd**
2019	ADAC GT Masters	Team Zakspeed BKK Mobil Oil Racing	2	0	0	0	0	13	30th
2019	Blancpain GT Series Endurance Cup	Mercedes-AMG Team GruppeM Racing	1	0	0	0	0	10	22nd
2019	Intercontinental GT Challenge	Mercedes-AMG Team GruppeM Racing	1	0	0	1	0	4	23rd
2020	Deutsche Tourenwagen Masters	BMW Team RMR	18	1	0	0	2	51	12th
2021	Deutsche Tourenwagen Masters	Mercedes-AMG Team Winward	16	2	1	1	4	152	5th
2021	GT World Challenge Europe Endurance Cup	AKKA ASP Team	1	0	0	0	0	1	32nd
2021	Intercontinental GT Challenge	Mercedes-AMG Team AKKA ASP	1	0	0	0	0	4	19th
2022	Deutsche Tourenwagen Masters	Mercedes-AMG Team Winward	16	2	2	1	4	153	**2nd**
2022	GT World Challenge Europe Endurance Cup	Winward Racing	5	0	0	0	0	0	NC
2022	GT World Challenge Europe Endurance Cup - Gold Cup	Winward Racing	5	0	1	1	0	31	10th
2022	IMSA SportsCar Championship - GTD	Winward Racing	1	0	1	0	0	285	54th
2022	Intercontinental GT Challenge	Mercedes-AMG GruppeM Racing	1	0	1	0	0	0	NC
2023	Deutsche Tourenwagen Masters	Mercedes-AMG Team Winward	16	0	0	1	2	111	9th
2023	GT World Challenge Europe Endurance Cup	Mercedes-AMG Team Al Manar	1	0	0	0	0	3	25th
2023	GT World Challenge Europe Endurance Cup	GetSpeed	1	0	0	0	0	3	25th
2023	GT World Challenge Europe Endurance Cup - Bronze Cup	GetSpeed	1	0	0	0	0	0	NC
2023	Intercontinental GT Challenge	Mercedes-AMG Team Al Manar	1	0	0	0	0	20	18th
2023	Intercontinental GT Challenge	Mercedes-AMG Team GruppeM Racing	1	0	0	0	0	20	18th
2023	IMSA SportsCar Championship - GTD	Winward Racing	0	0	0	0	0	0	NC
2024	Deutsche Tourenwagen Masters	Mercedes-AMG Team Winward	16	0	0	0	1	116	10th
2024	GT World Challenge Europe Sprint Cup	Winward Racing Team Mann-Filter	10	3	1	1	8	107	**1st**
2024	GT World Challenge Europe Endurance Cup	Mercedes-AMG Team Mann-Filter	5	1	0	1	2	48	6th
2024	Nürburgring Langstrecken-Serie - SP9	Mercedes-AMG Team GetSpeed	2	0	0	0	0	0	NC‡
2024	Nürburgring Langstrecken-Serie - SP9	Mercedes-AMG Team Landgraf	3	1	2	0	2	0	NC‡
2024	Intercontinental GT Challenge	Mercedes-AMG Team GetSpeed	2	0	0	0	0	0*	NC*
2024	24 Hours of Nürburgring - SP9	Mercedes-AMG Team GetSpeed	1	0	0	0	0	—N/a	DNF
2024	GT World Challenge America - Pro-Am	SunEnergy1 Racing	1	0	0	0	0	0	NC†
2024-25	Asian Le Mans Series - GT	Climax Racing	4	0	0	0	0	1	24th
2025	Deutsche Tourenwagen Masters	Mercedes-AMG Team Landgraf	16	2	2	1	4	188	**2nd**
2025	GT World Challenge Europe Sprint Cup	Winward Racing	10	1	1	2	4	76.5	4th
2025	IMSA SportsCar Championship - GTD	Winward Racing	1	0	0	0	0	312	62nd
2025	Nürburgring Langstrecken-Serie - SP9	Mercedes-AMG Team GetSpeed							
2025	GT World Challenge Europe Endurance Cup	Mercedes-AMG Team Mann-Filter	5	1	1	0	2	72	**2nd**
2025-26	Asian Le Mans Series - GT	QMMF by GetSpeed	6	0	2	0	0	27	13th
2026	IMSA SportsCar Championship - GTD	Winward Racing	1	1	0	0	1	382	56th
2026	GT World Challenge Europe Sprint Cup	Winward Racing	10	0	0	2	3	45.5	6th
2026	Deutsche Tourenwagen Masters	Mercedes-AMG Team Landgraf	16	1	0	1	5	182	4th
2026	Nürburgring Langstrecken-Serie - SP9	Mercedes-AMG Team Verstappen Racing							
2026	GT World Challenge Europe Endurance Cup	Mercedes-AMG Team Mann-Filter	5	0	1	0	3	86	**1st**
2026	FIA GT World Cup	Tigani Motorsport							

^{‡} As Auer was a guest driver, he was ineligible for championship points. ^{*} Season still in progress.

=== Complete German Formula Three Championship results ===
(key) (Races in bold indicate pole position) (Races in italics indicate fastest lap)

Year	Entrant	1	2	3	4	5	6	7	8	9	10	11	12	13	14	15	16	17	18	19	20	21	22	23	24	25	26	27	DC	Points
2012	Van Amersfoort Racing	**ZAN**; **1**; 2	ZAN; 2 DNS	**ZAN**; **3**; 4	SAC; 1; 6	SAC; 2 Ret	SAC; 3; 2	OSC; 1; 4	OSC; 2; 9	OSC; 2; 2	SPA; 1; 5	SPA; 2 Ret	SPA; 3; 5	ASS; 1; 9	ASS; 2; 4	ASS; 3; 2	RBR; 1; 5	RBR; 2; 1	RBR; 3; 2	LAU; 1; 4	LAU; 2; 4	LAU; 3; 1	NÜR; 1; 2	NÜR; 2; 4	NÜR; 3; 2	HOC; 1; 8	HOC; 2; 2	HOC; 3; 3	2nd	298

=== Complete FIA Formula 3 European Championship results ===
(key)

Year	Entrant	Engine	1	2	3	4	5	6	7	8	9	10	11	12	13	14	15	16	17	18	19	20	21	22	23	24	25	26	27	28	29	30	31	32	33	DC	Points
2012	Van Amersfoort Racing	Volkswagen	HOC; 1	HOC; 2	PAU; 1	PAU; 2	BRH; 1	BRH; 2	RBR; 1	RBR; 2	NOR; 1	NOR; 2	SPA; 1	SPA; 2	NÜR; 1	NÜR; 2	ZAN; 1	ZAN; 2	VAL; 1	VAL; 2	HOC; 1; 7	HOC; 2 Ret														NC‡	0‡
2013	Prema Powerteam	Mercedes	MNZ; 1; 2	MNZ; 2 Ret	MNZ; 3; 4	SIL; 1; 4	SIL; 2; 3	SIL; 3; 7	HOC; 1; 7	HOC; 2; 4	HOC; 3; 12	BRH; 1; 3	BRH; 2; 3	BRH; 3; 1	RBR; 1; 10	RBR; 2; 4	RBR; 3; 3	NOR; 1; 13	NOR; 2; 13	NOR; 3; 6	NÜR; 1; 5	NÜR; 2; 5	NÜR; 3; 2	ZAN; 1; 7	ZAN; 2; 12	ZAN; 3; 7	VAL; 1; 7	VAL; 2; 5	VAL; 3 Ret	HOC; 1; 26	HOC; 2; 3	HOC; 3; 3				4th	277
2014	kfzteile24 Mücke Motorsport	Mercedes	SIL; 1; 5	SIL; 2; 12	SIL; 3; 8	**HOC**; **1**; 1	HOC; 2; 4	HOC; 3; 4	PAU; 1; 2	PAU; 2; 7	PAU; 3; 6	HUN; 1; 4	HUN; 2; 3	HUN; 3; 3	SPA; 1; 2	SPA; 2 Ret	SPA; 3; 21	NOR; 1; 3	NOR; 2; 3	NOR; 3; 8	MSC; 1; 5	MSC; 2; 4	MSC; 3 Ret	RBR; 1; 10	RBR; 2; 3	RBR; 3; 3	NÜR; 1; 7	NÜR; 2; 5	NÜR; 3; 1	IMO; 1; 6	IMO; 2; 5	IMO; 3; 8	HOC; 1; 2	HOC; 2; 3	HOC; 3; 1	4th	365

‡ As Auer was a guest driver, he was ineligible for championship points.

=== Complete FIA World Endurance Championship results ===
(key) (Races in bold indicate pole position; races in italics indicate fastest lap)

Year	Entrant	Class	Chassis	Engine	1	2	3	4	5	6	7	8	Rank	Points
2013	Lotus	LMP2	Lotus T128	Praga Judd 3.6 L V8	SIL	SPA	LMS	SÃO	COA	FUJ	SHA	BHR; Ret	NC	0
2014	Lotus	LMP1	CLM P1/01	AER P60 2.0 L Turbo V6	SIL	SPA	LMS	COA; 15	FUJ	SHA; 14	BHR	SÃO; Ret	24th	1

=== Complete Deutsche Tourenwagen Masters results ===
(key) (Races in bold indicate pole position) (Races in italics indicate fastest lap)

Year	Team	Car	1	2	3	4	5	6	7	8	9	10	11	12	13	14	15	16	17	18	19	20	Pos	Points
2015	ART Grand Prix	DTM AMG Mercedes C-Coupé	HOC; 1 Ret	HOC; 2 DNS	LAU; 1; 21	LAU; 2 Ret	NOR; 1; 15	NOR; 2; 9	ZAN; 1; 17	ZAN; 2; 20	SPL; 1; 21	SPL; 2; 6	MSC; 1; 13	MSC; 2; 19	OSC; 1; 15	OSC; 2; 17	**NÜR**; **1**; 6	NÜR; 2; 19	HOC; 1; 16	HOC; 2; 19			23rd	18
2016	Mercedes-Benz DTM Team Mücke	Mercedes-AMG C63 DTM	HOC; 1; 17†	HOC; 2; 15†	SPL; 1; 21	SPL; 2; 16	LAU; 1; 7	**LAU**; **2**; 1	NOR; 1; 13	NOR; 2; 5	ZAN; 1; 12	ZAN; 2; 9	MSC; 1; 18	MSC; 2; 10	NÜR; 1; 7	**NÜR**; **2**; 2	HUN; 1; 15	HUN; 2; 15	HOC; 1; 18	HOC; 2; 16			12th	68
2017	Mercedes-AMG Motorsport BWT	Mercedes-AMG C63 DTM	**HOC**; **1**; 1	HOC; 2; 4	**LAU**; **1**; 1	LAU; 2; 10	HUN; 1; 12	HUN; 2 Ret	NOR; 1 Ret	NOR; 2; 2	MSC; 1; 6	MSC; 2; 8	ZAN; 1; 15	ZAN; 2; 14	**NÜR**; **1**; 1	NÜR; 2; 13	SPL; 1; 8	SPL; 2 Ret	HOC; 1; 8	HOC; 2; 10			6th	136
2018	SILBERPFEIL Energy Mercedes-AMG Motorsport	Mercedes-AMG C63 DTM	HOC; 1; 2	HOC; 2; 15	**LAU**; **1**; 4	LAU; 2; 14	HUN; 1; 2	**HUN**; **2** DSQ	NOR; 1; 7	NOR; 2; 5	ZAN; 1; 3	ZAN; 2; 9	BRH; 1; 3	BRH; 2; 8	MIS; 1 Ret	MIS; 2 Ret	NÜR; 1; 11	NÜR; 2; 18†	SPL; 1; 6	SPL; 2 Ret	**HOC**; **1** Ret	HOC; 2 DSQ	7th	121
2020	BMW Team RMR	BMW M4 Turbo DTM	SPA; 1; 7	SPA; 2; 8	LAU; 1; 12	LAU; 2; 14	LAU; 1; 12	LAU; 2; 1	ASS; 1; 11	ASS; 2; 10	NÜR; 1; 12	NÜR; 2; 11	NÜR; 1; 12	NÜR; 2; 13	ZOL; 1; 12	ZOL; 2; 3	ZOL; 1; 11	ZOL; 2 Ret	HOC; 1; 12	HOC; 2; 16			12th	51
2021	Mercedes-AMG Team Winward	Mercedes-AMG GT3 Evo	MNZ; 1; 12^{2}	MNZ; 2; 3	LAU; 1; 6	LAU; 2; 9	ZOL; 1; 9	ZOL; 2; 5^{2}	NÜR; 1; 11	NÜR; 2; 6	RBR; 1; 8	RBR; 2; 5	ASS; 1; 10	**ASS**; **2**; 1^{1}	HOC; 2 Ret^{2}	HOC; 2; 1^{2}	NOR; 1; 6^{3}	NOR; 2; 2					5th	152
2022	Mercedes-AMG Team Winward	Mercedes-AMG GT3 Evo	ALG; 1; 1^{3}	ALG; 2; 22	**LAU**; **1**; 3^{1}	LAU; 2; 8	IMO; 1 Ret	IMO; 2; 4	NOR; 1 Ret	NOR; 2; 13	NÜR; 1; 5	NÜR; 2; 3	SPA; 1 Ret^{3}	SPA; 2; 4	RBR; 1; 4	RBR; 2; 6	**HOC**; **1**; 1^{1}	HOC; 2; 7					2nd	153
2023	Mercedes-AMG Team Winward	Mercedes-AMG GT3 Evo	OSC; 1; 16	OSC; 2; 10	ZAN; 1; 6	ZAN; 2 Ret	NOR; 1; 4	NOR; 2; 11	NÜR; 1; 2	NÜR; 2; 3	LAU; 1; 4^{3}	LAU; 2; 6	SAC; 1 Ret	SAC; 2; 15	RBR; 1; 15	RBR; 2; 11	HOC; 1; 15	HOC; 2; 8					9th	111
2024	Mercedes-AMG Team Winward	Mercedes-AMG GT3 Evo	OSC; 1; 6	OSC; 2; 11	LAU; 1; 4	LAU; 2; 10	ZAN; 1; 5	ZAN; 2 Ret	NOR; 1 Ret	NOR; 2; 10	NÜR; 1; 4^{3}	NÜR; 2; 12	SAC; 1; 12	SAC; 2; 12	RBR; 1; 7	RBR; 2 Ret	HOC; 1; 2^{2}	HOC; 2; 8					10th	116
2025	Mercedes-AMG Team Landgraf	Mercedes-AMG GT3 Evo	**OSC**; **1**; 1^{1}	OSC; 2; 10	**LAU**; **1**; 1^{1}	LAU; 2; 9	ZAN; 1; 4	ZAN; 2; 7	NOR; 1; 6	NOR; 2; 8	NÜR; 1; 6	NÜR; 2; 3^{2}	SAC; 1; 10	SAC; 2; 8	RBR; 1; 12	RBR; 2; 3	HOC; 1; 12	HOC; 2; 4					2nd	188
2026	Mercedes-AMG Team Landgraf	Mercedes-AMG GT3 Evo	RBR; 1; 2	RBR; 2; 3^{3}	ZAN; 1; 2^{3}	ZAN; 2; 13	LAU; 1; 6^{3}	LAU; 2; 11	NOR; 1; 4	NOR; 2; 3	OSC; 1; 4	OSC; 2; 11	NÜR; 1; 5^{3}	NÜR; 2 Ret	SAC; 1; 11	SAC; 2; 5	HOC; 1; 1^{2}	HOC; 2; 13					4th	182

^{†} Driver did not finish, but was classified as he completed 75% of the race distance.

=== Complete GT World Challenge Europe results ===
==== GT World Challenge Europe Endurance Cup ====
(Races in bold indicate pole position) (Races in italics indicate fastest lap)

Year	Team	Car	Class	1	2	3	4	5	6	7	Pos.	Points
Blancpain GT Series Endurance Cup
2018	Strakka Racing	Mercedes-AMG GT3	Pro	MNZ; 8	SIL	LEC	SPA; 6H	SPA; 12H	SPA; 24H	CAT	42nd	4
2019	Mercedes-AMG Team GruppeM Racing	Mercedes-AMG GT3	Pro	MNZ	SIL	LEC	SPA; 6H; 13	SPA; 12H; 2	SPA; 24H; 10	CAT	22nd	10
GT World Challenge Europe Endurance Cup
2021	AKKA ASP Team	Mercedes-AMG GT3 Evo	Pro	MNZ	LEC	SPA; 6H; 26	SPA; 12H; 14	SPA; 24H; 10	NÜR	CAT	32th	1
2022	Winward Racing	Mercedes-AMG GT3 Evo	Gold	**IMO**; Ret	LEC; 35	SPA; 6H; 42	SPA; 12H; 32	SPA; 24H; 40†	HOC; 21	CAT; 33	10th	31
2023	Mercedes-AMG Team AlManar	Mercedes-AMG GT3 Evo	Pro	MNZ	LEC	SPA; 6H; 9	SPA; 12H; 15	SPA; 24H; 9	NÜR		25th	3
2023	GetSpeed	Mercedes-AMG GT3 Evo	Bronze							CAT; 45†	NC	0
2024	Mercedes-AMG Team Mann-Filter	Mercedes-AMG GT3 Evo	Pro	LEC; 45†	SPA; 6H; 10	SPA; 12H; 35	SPA; 24H; Ret	NÜR; 3	MNZ; 16	JED; 1	6th	48
2025	Mercedes-AMG Team Mann-Filter	Mercedes-AMG GT3 Evo	Pro	**LEC**; 4	MNZ; 1	SPA; 6H; 2	SPA; 12H; 7	SPA; 24H; 10	NÜR; 2	CAT; 13	2nd	72
2026	Mercedes-AMG Team Mann-Filter	Mercedes-AMG GT3 Evo	Pro	**LEC**; 2	MNZ; 2	SPA; 6H; 3	SPA; 12H; 4	SPA; 24H; 2	NÜR; 4	ALG; 14	1st	86

^{*} Season still in progress.

==== GT World Challenge Europe Sprint Cup ====
(key) (Races in bold indicate pole position; results in italics indicate fastest lap)

Year	Team	Car	Class	1	2	3	4	5	6	7	8	9	10	Pos.	Points
2024	Winward Racing Team Mann-Filter	Mercedes-AMG GT3 Evo	Pro	BRH; 1; 3	**BRH**; **2**; 1	MIS; 1; 5	MIS; 2; 2	HOC; 1; 1	HOC; 2; 3	MAG; 1; 2	MAG; 2; 1	CAT; 1; 3	CAT; 2; 4	1st	107
2025	Winward Racing	Mercedes-AMG GT3 Evo	Pro	BRH; 1; 6	**BRH**; **2**; 1	ZAN; 1; 3	ZAN; 2; 9	MIS; 1; 4	MIS; 2; 2	MAG; 1; 4	MAG; 2; 7	VAL; 1; 3	VAL; 2; 6	4th	76.5
2026	Winward Racing	Mercedes-AMG GT3 Evo	Pro	BRH; 1; 6	BRH; 2; 3	MIS; 1; 3	MIS; 2; 3	MAG; 1; 4	MAG; 2; 19	ZAN; 1; 13	ZAN; 2; 8	CAT; 1; 7	CAT; 2; 11	6th	45.5

^{*} Season still in progress.

=== Complete Super Formula results ===
(key) (Races in bold indicate pole position) (Races in italics indicate fastest lap)

Year	Team	Engine	1	2	3	4	5	6	7	DC	Points
2019	B-Max with Motopark	Honda	SUZ; 7	AUT; 11	SUG; 3	FUJ; Ret	MOT; 7	OKA; 5	SUZ; 11	9th	14

=== Complete IMSA SportsCar Championship results ===
(key) (Races in bold indicate pole position; results in italics indicate fastest lap)

Year	Team	Class	Make	Engine	1	2	3	4	5	6	7	8	9	10	11	12	Pos.	Points
2022	Winward Racing	GTD	Mercedes-AMG GT3 Evo	Mercedes-AMG M159 6.2 L V8	**DAY**; 6	SEB	LBH	LGA	MDO	DET	WGL	MOS	LIM	ELK	VIR	PET	54th	285
2023	Winward Racing	GTD	Mercedes-AMG GT3 Evo	Mercedes-AMG M159 6.2 L V8	DAY; WD	SEB	LBH	LGA	WGL	MOS	LIM	ELK	VIR	IMS	PET		NC	0
2025	Winward Racing	GTD	Mercedes-AMG GT3 Evo	Mercedes-AMG M159 6.2 L V8	DAY; 4	SEB	LBH	LGA	WGL	MOS	ELK	VIR	IMS	PET			62nd	312
2026	Winward Racing	GTD	Mercedes-AMG GT3 Evo	Mercedes-AMG M159 6.2 L V8	DAY; 1	SEB	LBH	LGA	WGL	MOS	ELK	VIR	IMS	PET			56th	382

Sporting positions
Preceded by Richard Bradley (Formula BMW Pacific)	JK Racing Asia Series; Champion; 2011	Succeeded by Aston Hare
Preceded by Mattia Drudi; Ricardo Feller	GT World Challenge Europe Sprint Cup; Champion; 2024; With: Maro Engel	Succeeded by Kelvin van der Linde; Charles Weerts
Awards and achievements
Preceded by Sheldon van der Linde	Allan Simonsen Trophy (Pole position Bathurst 12 Hour); 2025	Succeeded by Cam Waters
