= 2014 FIA Formula 3 European Championship =

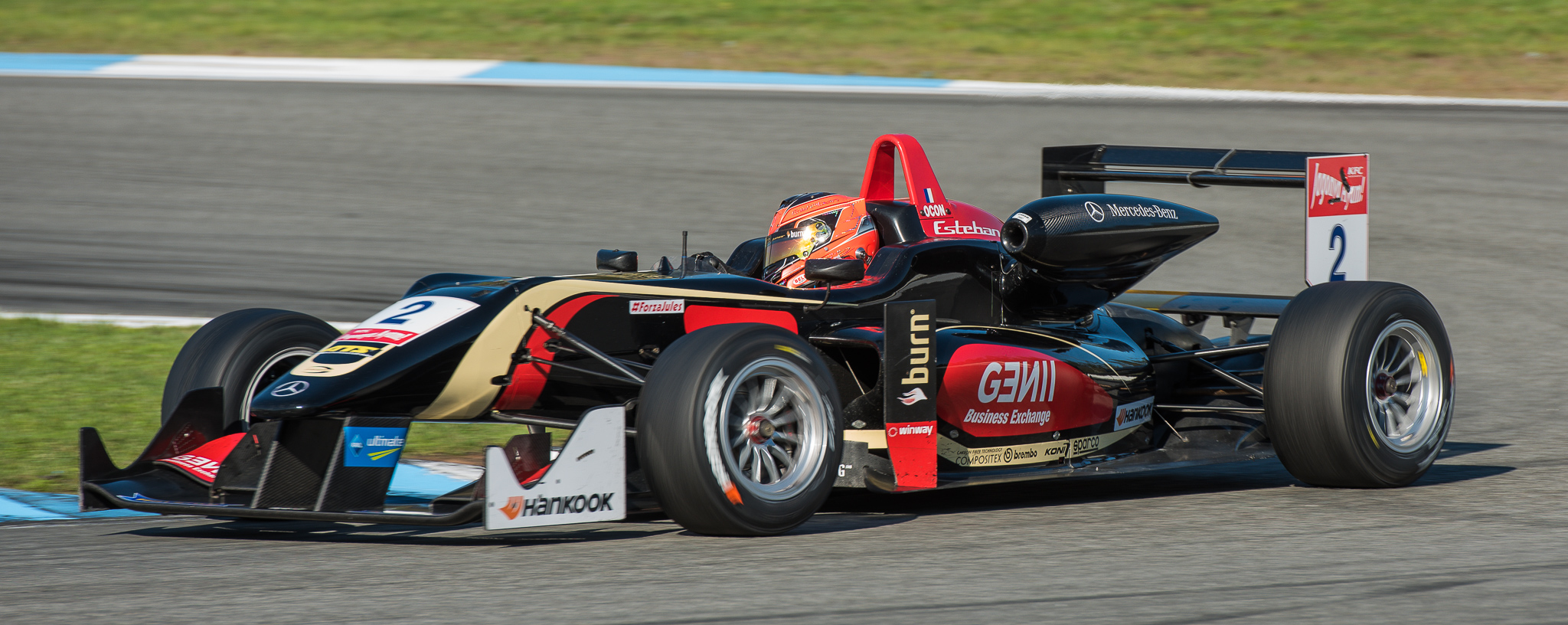
2014 champion Esteban Ocon

The 2014 FIA Formula 3 European Championship was a multi-event motor racing championship for single-seat open wheel formula racing cars that held across Europe. The championship featured drivers competing in two-litre Formula Three racing cars built by Italian constructor Dallara which conformed to the technical regulations, or formula, for the championship. It was the third edition of the FIA Formula 3 European Championship. Raffaele Marciello was the reigning drivers' champion, but he did not defend his title as he stepped up to the GP2 Series. His team, Prema Powerteam represented in the Teams' championship by Esteban Ocon and Antonio Fuoco, defended their Teams' title.

Ocon clinched both the main and rookie championship titles after nine race wins. Jagonya Ayam with Carlin driver Tom Blomqvist finished as runner-up, securing six wins, while Van Amersfoort Racing driver Max Verstappen, who made his debut in single-seaters, collected ten wins and finished just nine points behind Blomqvist. Lucas Auer, who raced for kfzteile24 Mücke Motorsport, won races at Hockenheim and the Nürburgring to finish fourth in the championship. Fuoco achieved wins at Silverstone and Spielberg and completed the top five in the championship. His compatriot Antonio Giovinazzi was a winner of races at Spielberg and the Nürburgring, while series veteran Felix Rosenqvist was the only other driver to win a race, triumphing at the Pau Grand Prix meeting.

== Drivers and teams ==
The following teams and drivers competed during the 2014 season:

Team	Chassis (Note: All drivers competed in Dallara chassis; model listed.)	Engine	No.	Driver	Status	Rounds
(Italy) Prema Powerteam	F314/003	Mercedes	1	(Canada) Nicholas Latifi (Note: Ineligible to score points for the team in the teams' championship at rounds 2–10.)		1–10
(Italy) Prema Powerteam	F312/015	Mercedes	2	(France) Esteban Ocon	R	All
(Italy) Prema Powerteam	F312/030	Mercedes	25	(Italy) Antonio Fuoco (Note: Ineligible to score points for the team in the teams' championship at round 1)	R	All
(Italy) Prema Powerteam	F312/005	Mercedes	26	(Netherlands) Dennis van de Laar (Note: Ineligible to score points for the team in the teams' championship.)		All
(Germany) Mücke Motorsport	F312/019	Mercedes	3	(Austria) Lucas Auer		All
(Germany) Mücke Motorsport	F312/023	Mercedes	4	(Israel) Roy Nissany		All
(Germany) Mücke Motorsport	F312/020	Mercedes	27	(Sweden) Felix Rosenqvist		All
(United Kingdom) Carlin	F312/004	Volkswagen	5	(United Kingdom) Jordan King		All
(United Kingdom) Carlin	F312/016	Volkswagen	6	(United Arab Emirates) Ed Jones (Note: Ineligible to score points for the team in the teams' championship at rounds 1, 9–11.)		1–3, 8–11
(United Kingdom) Carlin	F312/001	Volkswagen	28	(United Kingdom) Jake Dennis (Note: Ineligible to score points for the team in the teams' championship at rounds 2–3, 8.)	R	All
(Italy) EuroInternational	F312/053	Mercedes	7	(Italy) Riccardo Agostini		1–3
(Italy) EuroInternational	F312/003	Mercedes	8	(Italy) Michele Beretta	R	All
(Italy) EuroInternational	F312/053	Mercedes	29	(United States) Santino Ferrucci	R	5–9
(Italy) EuroInternational	F312/053	Mercedes	29	(Brazil) Sérgio Sette Câmara (Note: Ineligible to score any championship points.)		10
(Italy) EuroInternational	F312/053	Mercedes	29	(Monaco) Stefano Coletti		11
(United Kingdom) Fortec Motorsports	F312/011	Mercedes	9	(Australia) Mitch Gilbert		1–6
(United Kingdom) Fortec Motorsports	F312/011	Mercedes	9	(Mexico) Alfonso Celis Jr.		8
(United Kingdom) Fortec Motorsports	F312/011	Mercedes	9	(China) Martin Cao		10
(United Kingdom) Fortec Motorsports	F312/007	Mercedes	10	(Sweden) John Bryant-Meisner		1–6, 8
(United Kingdom) Fortec Motorsports	F312/007	Mercedes	10	(United States) Santino Ferrucci	R	10–11
(United Kingdom) ThreeBond Racing with T-Sport	F312/049	NBE	11	(Australia) Richard Goddard		1–6, 8–11
(United Kingdom) ThreeBond Racing with T-Sport	F312/008	NBE	12	(Spain) Alexander Toril		1–6, 8–11
(United Kingdom) ThreeBond Racing with T-Sport	F314/019	NBE	32	(New Zealand) Nick Cassidy		10–11
(United Kingdom) Double R Racing	F313/001	Mercedes	14	(Brazil) Felipe Guimarães		1–6
(Netherlands) Van Amersfoort Racing	F312/051	Volkswagen	15	(Netherlands) Jules Szymkowiak (Note: Ineligible to score points for the team in the teams' championship at rounds 2–11.)	R	All
(Netherlands) Van Amersfoort Racing	F312/052	Volkswagen	16	(United States) Gustavo Menezes		All
(Netherlands) Van Amersfoort Racing	F314/009	Volkswagen	30	(Netherlands) Max Verstappen	R	All
(Switzerland) Jo Zeller Racing	F312/039	Mercedes	17	(Switzerland) Sandro Zeller		2, 4–6, 8–11
(Switzerland) Jo Zeller Racing	F312/044	Mercedes	18	(Colombia) Tatiana Calderón		All
(United Kingdom) Jagonya Ayam with Carlin	F314/020	Volkswagen	19	(Italy) Antonio Giovinazzi		All
(United Kingdom) Jagonya Ayam with Carlin	F312/002	Volkswagen	20	(Indonesia) Sean Gelael		All
(United Kingdom) Jagonya Ayam with Carlin	F312/010	Volkswagen	31	(United Kingdom) Tom Blomqvist		All
(United Kingdom) Team West-Tec F3	F314/007	Mercedes	21	(Puerto Rico) Félix Serrallés		All
(United Kingdom) Team West-Tec F3	F312/011	Mercedes	22	(United Kingdom) Hector Hurst		1–8
(United Kingdom) Team West-Tec F3	F312/011	Mercedes	22	(Macau) Wing Chung Chang		9–11
(France) Signature	F314/005	Volkswagen	23	(United Kingdom) William Buller		10

Icon	Legend
R	Rookie Cup

- Signature was scheduled to enter the season with Renault engines and Tatiana Calderón and Óscar Tunjo as their drivers, but cancelled the plan on the eve of the opening round. Calderón later signed for Jo Zeller Racing, while the team returned at the penultimate round of the season using Volkswagen engines.

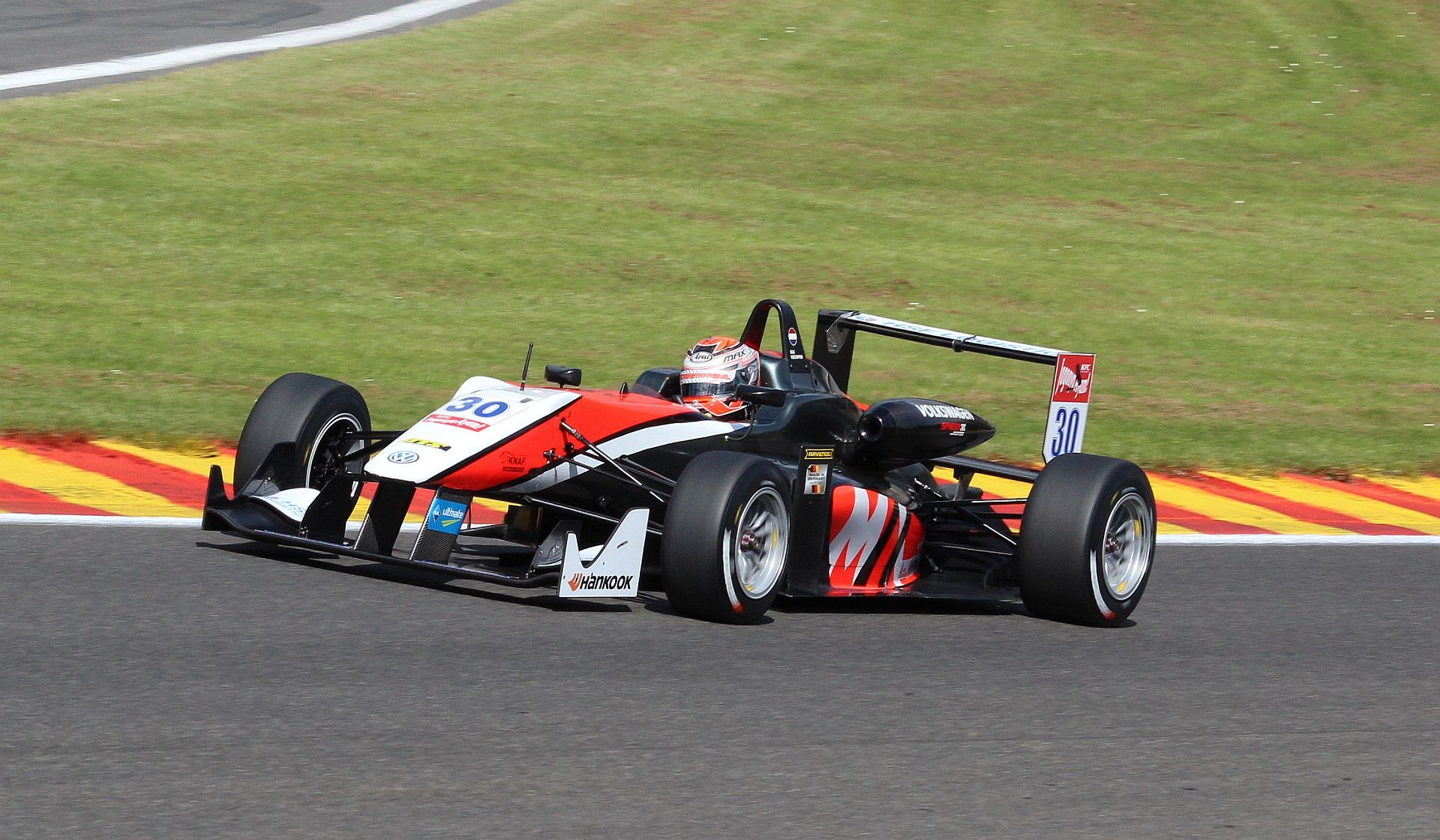
Max Verstappen won 10 races in his first single seaters season

== Calendar ==
A provisional eleven-round calendar was announced on 4 December 2013. The series returned to Pau after a one-year absence, as the previously scheduled British F3 event in 2013 was cancelled, after a restructure of the championship calendar.

R.	RN	Circuit/Location	Date	Supporting
1	1	(United Kingdom) Silverstone Circuit, Silverstone	19 April	6 Hours of Silverstone
1	2	(United Kingdom) Silverstone Circuit, Silverstone	19 April	6 Hours of Silverstone
1	3	(United Kingdom) Silverstone Circuit, Silverstone	20 April	6 Hours of Silverstone
2	4	(Germany) Hockenheimring, Baden-Württemberg	3 May	Deutsche Tourenwagen Masters
2	5	(Germany) Hockenheimring, Baden-Württemberg	4 May	Deutsche Tourenwagen Masters
2	6	(Germany) Hockenheimring, Baden-Württemberg	4 May	Deutsche Tourenwagen Masters
3	7	(France) Pau Circuit, Pau	10 May	Pau Grand Prix
3	8	(France) Pau Circuit, Pau	11 May	Pau Grand Prix
3	9	(France) Pau Circuit, Pau	11 May	Pau Grand Prix
4	10	(Hungary) Hungaroring, Mogyoród	31 May	Deutsche Tourenwagen Masters
4	11	(Hungary) Hungaroring, Mogyoród	1 June	Deutsche Tourenwagen Masters
4	12	(Hungary) Hungaroring, Mogyoród	1 June	Deutsche Tourenwagen Masters
5	13	(Belgium) Circuit de Spa-Francorchamps, Francorchamps	21 June	FIA WTCC Race of Belgium
5	14	(Belgium) Circuit de Spa-Francorchamps, Francorchamps	21 June	FIA WTCC Race of Belgium
5	15	(Belgium) Circuit de Spa-Francorchamps, Francorchamps	22 June	FIA WTCC Race of Belgium
6	16	(Germany) Norisring, Nuremberg	28 June	Deutsche Tourenwagen Masters
6	17	(Germany) Norisring, Nuremberg	29 June	Deutsche Tourenwagen Masters
6	18	(Germany) Norisring, Nuremberg	29 June	Deutsche Tourenwagen Masters
7	19	(Russia) Moscow Raceway, Volokolamsk	12 July	Deutsche Tourenwagen Masters
7	20	(Russia) Moscow Raceway, Volokolamsk	13 July	Deutsche Tourenwagen Masters
7	21	(Russia) Moscow Raceway, Volokolamsk	13 July	Deutsche Tourenwagen Masters
8	22	(Austria) Red Bull Ring, Spielberg	2 August	Deutsche Tourenwagen Masters
8	23	(Austria) Red Bull Ring, Spielberg	3 August	Deutsche Tourenwagen Masters
8	24	(Austria) Red Bull Ring, Spielberg	3 August	Deutsche Tourenwagen Masters
9	25	(Germany) Nürburgring, Rhineland-Palatinate	16 August	Deutsche Tourenwagen Masters
9	26	(Germany) Nürburgring, Rhineland-Palatinate	17 August	Deutsche Tourenwagen Masters
9	27	(Germany) Nürburgring, Rhineland-Palatinate	17 August	Deutsche Tourenwagen Masters
10	28	(Italy) Autodromo Enzo e Dino Ferrari, Imola	11 October	Italian GT Championship
10	29	(Italy) Autodromo Enzo e Dino Ferrari, Imola	12 October	Italian GT Championship
10	30	(Italy) Autodromo Enzo e Dino Ferrari, Imola	12 October	Italian GT Championship
11	31	(Germany) Hockenheimring, Baden-Württemberg	18 October	Deutsche Tourenwagen Masters
11	32	(Germany) Hockenheimring, Baden-Württemberg	18 October	Deutsche Tourenwagen Masters
11	33	(Germany) Hockenheimring, Baden-Württemberg	19 October	Deutsche Tourenwagen Masters

== Results ==
Round		Circuit	Pole position	Fastest lap	Winning driver	Winning team	Rookie winner
1	R1	(United Kingdom) Silverstone Circuit	(United Kingdom) Tom Blomqvist	(United Kingdom) Tom Blomqvist	(United Kingdom) Tom Blomqvist	(United Kingdom) Jagonya Ayam with Carlin	(France) Esteban Ocon
1	R2	(United Kingdom) Silverstone Circuit	(France) Esteban Ocon	(France) Esteban Ocon	(France) Esteban Ocon	(Italy) Prema Powerteam	(France) Esteban Ocon
1	R3	(United Kingdom) Silverstone Circuit	(France) Esteban Ocon	(Italy) Antonio Fuoco	(Italy) Antonio Fuoco	(Italy) Prema Powerteam	(Italy) Antonio Fuoco
2	R1	(Germany) Hockenheimring	(Austria) Lucas Auer	(Austria) Lucas Auer	(Austria) Lucas Auer	(Germany) kfzteile24 Mücke Motorsport	(United Kingdom) Jake Dennis
2	R2	(Germany) Hockenheimring	(Netherlands) Max Verstappen	(United Kingdom) Tom Blomqvist	(France) Esteban Ocon	(Italy) Prema Powerteam	(France) Esteban Ocon
2	R3	(Germany) Hockenheimring	(Netherlands) Max Verstappen	(Italy) Antonio Fuoco	(Netherlands) Max Verstappen	(Netherlands) Van Amersfoort Racing	(Netherlands) Max Verstappen
3	R1	(France) Pau Circuit	(France) Esteban Ocon	(France) Esteban Ocon	(France) Esteban Ocon	(Italy) Prema Powerteam	(France) Esteban Ocon
3	R2	(France) Pau Circuit	(France) Esteban Ocon	(Sweden) Felix Rosenqvist	(United Kingdom) Tom Blomqvist	(United Kingdom) Jagonya Ayam with Carlin	(France) Esteban Ocon
3	R3	(France) Pau Circuit	(France) Esteban Ocon	(Sweden) Felix Rosenqvist	(Sweden) Felix Rosenqvist	(Germany) kfzteile24 Mücke Motorsport	(France) Esteban Ocon
4	R1	(Hungary) Hungaroring	(France) Esteban Ocon	(United Kingdom) Tom Blomqvist	(United Kingdom) Tom Blomqvist	(United Kingdom) Jagonya Ayam with Carlin	(France) Esteban Ocon
4	R2	(Hungary) Hungaroring	(France) Esteban Ocon	(France) Esteban Ocon	(France) Esteban Ocon	(Italy) Prema Powerteam	(France) Esteban Ocon
4	R3	(Hungary) Hungaroring	(France) Esteban Ocon	(France) Esteban Ocon	(France) Esteban Ocon	(Italy) Prema Powerteam	(France) Esteban Ocon
5	R1	(Belgium) Circuit de Spa-Francorchamps	(France) Esteban Ocon	(Netherlands) Max Verstappen	(Netherlands) Max Verstappen	(Netherlands) Van Amersfoort Racing	(Netherlands) Max Verstappen
5	R2	(Belgium) Circuit de Spa-Francorchamps	(United States) Gustavo Menezes	(France) Esteban Ocon	(Netherlands) Max Verstappen	(Netherlands) Van Amersfoort Racing	(Netherlands) Max Verstappen
5	R3	(Belgium) Circuit de Spa-Francorchamps	(France) Esteban Ocon	(France) Esteban Ocon	(Netherlands) Max Verstappen	(Netherlands) Van Amersfoort Racing	(Netherlands) Max Verstappen
6	R1	(Germany) Norisring	(Sweden) Felix Rosenqvist	(Netherlands) Max Verstappen	(Netherlands) Max Verstappen	(Netherlands) Van Amersfoort Racing	(Netherlands) Max Verstappen
6	R2	(Germany) Norisring	(Netherlands) Max Verstappen	(Netherlands) Max Verstappen	(Netherlands) Max Verstappen	(Netherlands) Van Amersfoort Racing	(Netherlands) Max Verstappen
6	R3	(Germany) Norisring	(Netherlands) Max Verstappen	(Netherlands) Max Verstappen	(Netherlands) Max Verstappen	(Netherlands) Van Amersfoort Racing	(Netherlands) Max Verstappen
7	R1	(Russia) Moscow Raceway	(France) Esteban Ocon	(Netherlands) Max Verstappen	(France) Esteban Ocon	(Italy) Prema Powerteam	(France) Esteban Ocon
7	R2	(Russia) Moscow Raceway	(France) Esteban Ocon	(France) Esteban Ocon	(France) Esteban Ocon	(Italy) Prema Powerteam	(France) Esteban Ocon
7	R3	(Russia) Moscow Raceway	(France) Esteban Ocon	(United Kingdom) Tom Blomqvist	(France) Esteban Ocon	(Italy) Prema Powerteam	(France) Esteban Ocon
8	R1	(Austria) Red Bull Ring	(France) Esteban Ocon	(Italy) Antonio Giovinazzi	(United Kingdom) Tom Blomqvist	(United Kingdom) Jagonya Ayam with Carlin	(United Kingdom) Jake Dennis
8	R2	(Austria) Red Bull Ring	(Italy) Antonio Giovinazzi	(Italy) Antonio Giovinazzi	(Italy) Antonio Fuoco	(Italy) Prema Powerteam	(Italy) Antonio Fuoco
8	R3	(Austria) Red Bull Ring	(Italy) Antonio Giovinazzi	(Italy) Antonio Giovinazzi	(Italy) Antonio Giovinazzi	(United Kingdom) Jagonya Ayam with Carlin	(United Kingdom) Jake Dennis
9	R1	(Germany) Nürburgring	(Netherlands) Max Verstappen	(United Kingdom) Tom Blomqvist	(Netherlands) Max Verstappen	(Netherlands) Van Amersfoort Racing	(Netherlands) Max Verstappen
9	R2	(Germany) Nürburgring	(United Kingdom) Tom Blomqvist	(United Kingdom) Tom Blomqvist	(Italy) Antonio Giovinazzi	(United Kingdom) Jagonya Ayam with Carlin	(France) Esteban Ocon
9	R3	(Germany) Nürburgring	(United Kingdom) Tom Blomqvist	(United Kingdom) Tom Blomqvist	(Austria) Lucas Auer	(Germany) kfzteile24 Mücke Motorsport	(Netherlands) Max Verstappen
10	R1	(Italy) Autodromo Enzo e Dino Ferrari	(France) Esteban Ocon	(Sweden) Felix Rosenqvist	(France) Esteban Ocon	(Italy) Prema Powerteam	(France) Esteban Ocon
10	R2	(Italy) Autodromo Enzo e Dino Ferrari	(United Kingdom) Tom Blomqvist	(United Kingdom) Tom Blomqvist	(United Kingdom) Tom Blomqvist	(United Kingdom) Jagonya Ayam with Carlin	(Netherlands) Max Verstappen
10	R3	(Italy) Autodromo Enzo e Dino Ferrari	(Netherlands) Max Verstappen	(Netherlands) Max Verstappen	(Netherlands) Max Verstappen	(Netherlands) Van Amersfoort Racing	(Netherlands) Max Verstappen
11	R1	(Germany) Hockenheimring	(Netherlands) Max Verstappen	(Netherlands) Max Verstappen	(Netherlands) Max Verstappen	(Netherlands) Van Amersfoort Racing	(Netherlands) Max Verstappen
11	R2	(Germany) Hockenheimring	(United Kingdom) Tom Blomqvist	(United Kingdom) Tom Blomqvist	(United Kingdom) Tom Blomqvist	(United Kingdom) Jagonya Ayam with Carlin	(France) Esteban Ocon
11	R3	(Germany) Hockenheimring	(United Kingdom) Tom Blomqvist	(Austria) Lucas Auer	(Austria) Lucas Auer	(Germany) kfzteile24 Mücke Motorsport	(Netherlands) Max Verstappen

== Championship standings ==
Scoring system

Position	1st	2nd	3rd	4th	5th	6th	7th	8th	9th	10th
Points	25	18	15	12	10	8	6	4	2	1

=== Drivers' championship ===
(key)

Pos.	Driver	SIL (United Kingdom)			HOC (Germany)			PAU (France)			HUN (Hungary)			SPA (Belgium)			NOR (Germany)			MSC (Russia)			RBR (Austria)			NÜR (Germany)			IMO (Italy)			HOC (Germany)			Points
Pos.	Driver	R1	R2	R3	R1	R2	R3	R1	R2	R3	R1	R2	R3	R1	R2	R3	R1	R2	R3	R1	R2	R3	R1	R2	R3	R1	R2	R3	R1	R2	R3	R1	R2	R3	Points
1	(France) Esteban Ocon	2	1	3	9	1	2	1	2	2	2	1	1	Ret	2	2	2	14	2	1	1	1	13	Ret	13	6	3	Ret	1	4	3	7	4	7	478
2	(United Kingdom) Tom Blomqvist	1	4	6	4	5	Ret	11	1	3	1	5	6	4	8	6	10	Ret	Ret	4	3	7	1	2	2	5	2	2	3	1	5	3	1	3	420
3	(Netherlands) Max Verstappen	Ret	5	2	Ret	DNS	1	3	Ret	Ret	Ret	16	4	1	1	1	1	1	1	3	Ret	2	5	4	12	1	Ret	3	Ret	2	1	1	5	6	411
4	(Austria) Lucas Auer	5	12	8	1	4	4	2	7	6	4	3	3	2	Ret	21	3	3	8	5	4	Ret	10	3	3	7	5	1	6	5	8	2	3	1	365
5	(Italy) Antonio Fuoco	4	3	1	11	Ret	3	17	19†	11	19	2	2	5	Ret	16	Ret	7	9	6	2	3	6	1	19	2	4	4	16	25	2	14	DSQ	DNS	255
6	(Italy) Antonio Giovinazzi	12	8	5	Ret	2	5	7	4	10	23†	6	5	Ret	9	11	Ret	9	7	13	16	10	2	16	1	3	1	Ret	5	3	Ret	4	2	5	238
7	(United Kingdom) Jordan King	3	6	9	3	9	7	5	18†	9	5	Ret	DNS	10	10	10	Ret	2	3	2	5	Ret	9	Ret	7	4	6	5	2	19	11	6	13	2	217
8	(Sweden) Felix Rosenqvist	9	14	7	5	7	Ret	14	Ret	1	3	4	17	7	4	9	6	6	11	8	7	5	4	Ret	Ret	8	7	Ret	4	9	Ret	5	6	4	198
9	(United Kingdom) Jake Dennis	17	17	Ret	7	10	6	4	3	4	11	17	9	3	6	7	5	4	Ret	15	6	4	3	18†	5	Ret	Ret	9	7	7	7	15	12	11	174
10	(Canada) Nicholas Latifi	6	2	4	Ret	6	Ret	Ret	17†	Ret	22	9	10	13	7	5	4	8	Ret	7	8	17†	Ret	8	4	13	10	Ret	Ret	6	4				128
11	(United States) Gustavo Menezes	16	13	18	Ret	21	9	15	13	Ret	17	7	8	6	3	3	Ret	10	5	10	15	12	7	5	8	14	13	13	Ret	10	10	8	9	16	91
12	(Puerto Rico) Félix Serrallés	7	15	10	8	8	Ret	6	8	13	7	8	7	11	Ret	4	8	11	13	9	10	Ret	14	Ret	Ret	12	Ret	7	8	8	9	9	11	Ret	82
13	(United Arab Emirates) Ed Jones	8	7	15	2	3	15	8	Ret	17													NC	6	6	10	8	DNS	13	13	Ret	13	14	9	70
14	(Netherlands) Dennis van de Laar	11	9	12	19	12	13	13	5	7	8	12	14	17	14	20	Ret	12	DNS	12	9	6	8	Ret	14	11	12	Ret	12	11	13	17	10	10	38
15	(Colombia) Tatiana Calderón	23	18	19	18	22	18	18	Ret	15	20	15	16	15	5	17	Ret	Ret	10	14	11	8	15	13	9	Ret	9	8	9	14	Ret	12	8	Ret	29
16	(Australia) Mitch Gilbert	13	16	Ret	6	11	14	Ret	6	5	9	11	23	20	12	18	11	20	17																28
17	(Israel) Roy Nissany	20	22	16	Ret	15	8	20	9	16	15	14	11	16	11	12	7	19	Ret	18	14	16	11	14	11	15	11	6	Ret	21	12	11	7	13	26
18	(Indonesia) Sean Gelael	15	20	NC	13	20	22	10	Ret	Ret	10	21	13	18	13	13	9	17	6	17	17	11	12	7	10	16	21†	11	10	16	Ret	10	18	8	25
19	(United States) Santino Ferrucci													Ret	DNS	15	12	5	4	16	13	14	Ret	12	20†	9	17	14	Ret	Ret	16	19	17	15	24
20	(Netherlands) Jules Szymkowiak	19	24	20	Ret	16	16	19	Ret	14	6	19	15	9	Ret	8	18†	Ret	Ret	11	12	13	Ret	9	15	17	14	10	Ret	15	14	22	15	20	17
21	(Sweden) John Bryant-Meisner	18	10	11	20	13	19	12	11	8	14	10	12	14	18	23†	15	13	15				20	11	Ret										6
22	(Brazil) Felipe Guimarães	10	11	Ret	12	14	Ret	16	15	12	13	13	20	8	Ret	Ret	Ret	Ret	Ret																5
23	(Australia) Richard Goddard	14	Ret	21	10	24	12	9	Ret	Ret	16	23	22	12	15	22	17	Ret	14				21	Ret	17	19	15	17	15	18	19	20	21	12	3
24	(United Kingdom) Hector Hurst	22	Ret	13	15	23	17	21	10	18	18	20	19	19	17	Ret	13	15	16	19	Ret	9	16	19	16										3
25	(Spain) Alexander Toril	Ret	19	14	16	19	20	Ret	16	Ret	12	22	18	Ret	19†	14	16	18	12				17	10	Ret	18	16	12	Ret	Ret	15	21	16	21†	1
26	(Italy) Riccardo Agostini	21	23	22†	Ret	18	10	22†	14	Ret																									1
27	(Switzerland) Sandro Zeller				14	17	11				21	18	Ret	21	16	Ret	14	16	18				18	Ret	18	22	19	16	Ret	23	Ret	18	20	17	0
28	(Italy) Michele Beretta	Ret	21	17	17	Ret	21	Ret	12	Ret	Ret	24	21	22	Ret	19	Ret	Ret	19	20	Ret	15	22	17	Ret	21	18	15	17	17	17	Ret	NC	14	0
29	(Mexico) Alfonso Celis Jr.																						19	15	Ret										0
30	(Macau) Wing Chung Chang																									20	20	18	18	22	18	Ret	22	19	0
Guest drivers ineligible for points
	(United Kingdom) William Buller																												Ret	Ret	6				
	(New Zealand) Nick Cassidy																												11	12	22	16	19	18	
	(Brazil) Sérgio Sette Câmara																												14	20	21				
	(China) Hongwei Cao																												Ret	24	20				
	(Monaco) Stefano Coletti																															Ret	Ret	22	
Pos.	Driver	R1	R2	R3	R1	R2	R3	R1	R2	R3	R1	R2	R3	R1	R2	R3	R1	R2	R3	R1	R2	R3	R1	R2	R3	R1	R2	R3	R1	R2	R3	R1	R2	R3	Points
Pos.	Driver	SIL (United Kingdom)			HOC (Germany)			PAU (France)			HUN (Hungary)			SPA (Belgium)			NOR (Germany)			MSC (Russia)			RBR (Austria)			NÜR (Germany)			IMO (Italy)			HOC (Germany)			Points

† — Drivers did not finish the race, but were classified as they completed over 90% of the race distance.

=== Rookies' championship ===
Pos.	Driver	SIL (United Kingdom)			HOC (Germany)			PAU (France)			HUN (Hungary)			SPA (Belgium)			NOR (Germany)			MSC (Russia)			RBR (Austria)			NÜR (Germany)			IMO (Italy)			HOC (Germany)			Points
Pos.	Driver	R1	R2	R3	R1	R2	R3	R1	R2	R3	R1	R2	R3	R1	R2	R3	R1	R2	R3	R1	R2	R3	R1	R2	R3	R1	R2	R3	R1	R2	R3	R1	R2	R3	Points
1	(France) Esteban Ocon	2	1	3	9	1	2	1	2	2	2	1	1	Ret	2	2	2	14	2	1	1	1	13	Ret	13	6	3	Ret	1	4	3	7	4	7	619
2	(Netherlands) Max Verstappen	Ret	5	2	Ret	DNS	1	3	Ret	Ret	Ret	16	4	1	1	1	1	1	1	3	Ret	2	5	4	12	1	Ret	3	Ret	2	1	1	5	6	514
3	(United Kingdom) Jake Dennis	17	17	Ret	7	10	6	4	3	4	11	17	9	3	6	7	5	4	Ret	15	6	4	3	18†	5	Ret	Ret	9	7	7	7	15	12	11	450
4	(Italy) Antonio Fuoco	4	3	1	11	Ret	3	17	19†	11	19	2	2	5	Ret	16	Ret	7	9	6	2	3	6	1	19	2	4	4	16	25	2	14	DSQ	DNS	433
5	(Netherlands) Jules Szymkowiak	19	24	20	Ret	16	16	19	Ret	14	6	19	15	9	Ret	8	18†	Ret	Ret	11	12	13	Ret	9	15	17	14	10	Ret	15	14	22	15	20	297
6	(Italy) Michele Beretta	Ret	21	17	17	Ret	21	Ret	12	Ret	Ret	24	21	22	Ret	19	Ret	Ret	19	20	Ret	15	22	17	Ret	21	18	15	17	17	17	Ret	Ret	14	197
7	(United States) Santino Ferrucci													Ret	DNS	15	12	5	4	16	13	14	Ret	12	20†	9	17	14	Ret	Ret	16	19	17	15	170
Pos.	Driver	R1	R2	R3	R1	R2	R3	R1	R2	R3	R1	R2	R3	R1	R2	R3	R1	R2	R3	R1	R2	R3	R1	R2	R3	R1	R2	R3	R1	R2	R3	R1	R2	R3	Points
Pos.	Driver	SIL (United Kingdom)			HOC (Germany)			PAU (France)			HUN (Hungary)			SPA (Belgium)			NOR (Germany)			MSC (Russia)			RBR (Austria)			NÜR (Germany)			IMO (Italy)			HOC (Germany)			Points

=== Teams' championship ===
Prior to each round of the championship, two drivers from each team – if applicable – were nominated to score teams' championship points.

Pos	Team	Points
1	(Italy) Prema Powerteam	740
2	(United Kingdom) Jagonya Ayam with Carlin	704
3	(Germany) kfzteile24 Mücke Motorsport	605
4	(Netherlands) Van Amersfoort Racing	539
5	(United Kingdom) Carlin	418
6	(United Kingdom) Team West-Tec F3	130
7	(United Kingdom) Fortec Motorsports	75
8	(Switzerland) Jo Zeller Racing	49
9	(Italy) EuroInternational	36
10	(United Kingdom) ThreeBond with T-Sport	23
11	(United Kingdom) Double R Racing	14
Guest team ineligible for points
	(France) Signature	0
