= Félix Serrallés =

Puerto Rican race car driver

Félix Juan Serrallés
- Nationality: (Puerto Rico) Puerto Rican
- Born: Félix Juan Serrallés IV; June 24, 1992 (age 34) Ponce, Puerto Rico

Blancpain GT Series career
- Debut season: 2017
- Current team: AKKA ASP
- Categorisation: FIA Gold
- Car number: 87
- Starts: 12
- Wins: 1
- Poles: 1
- Fastest laps: 0
- Best finish: 15th in 2017

Previous series
- 2017 2015-16 2013-14 2012-13 2012 2011 2011 2010-11 2009–10: Blancpain GT Series; Indy Lights; FIA European Formula 3 Championship; Toyota Racing Series; British Formula 3 Championship; Eurocup Formula Renault 2.0; Formula Renault UK; Formula Renault UK Winter Cup; Skip Barber National Championship

Awards
- 2010: Team USA Scholarship

Félix Juan Serrallés IV (born June 24, 1992) is a Puerto Rican racing driver. After gathering two second-place finishes in the Caribbean Karting Championship, Serrallés joined the Skip Barber National Championship and finished third. Afterwards, he was recruited by Fortec Motorsport and moved to Europe, where he debuted in the Formula Renault. By 2012, Serrallés had fully adapted to formula racing, remaining in the run for the British Formula 3 Championship until the final race of the season and eventually finishing third. After being sidelined by a back injury for most of 2013, he joined Team West-Tec for the 2014 season of the European Formula 3 Championship.

== Early years ==
Félix Juan Serrallés IV was born on 24 June 1992 in Ponce, Puerto Rico. He is the grandson of Puerto Rican Don Q rum magnate Félix Juan Serrallés Jr., the president of Destilería Serrallés headquartered in the same town and grandson of the late Puerto Rican entrepreneur, industrialist and inventor Efraín D. Vassallo Ruíz of Industrias Vassallo fame.

== Career ==
=== Karting ===
Serrallés began his racing career in karting at the age of ten and was runner-up in the Caribbean Championship in both 2004 and 2005.

=== Skip Barber National Championship ===
After winning a scholarship in 2009 Skip Barber Shootout, Serrallés became a Mazdaspeed Development Driver and had a season in Skip Barber National Championship, where he finished third with two wins.

=== Formula Renault ===
In 2010, Serrallés raced in Europe, taking part in the Formula Renault UK Winter Cup for Fortec Motorsport as a guest driver. He continued his collaboration with Fortec into 2011 and the Formula Renault Eurocup, scoring eight points-scoring finishes on his way to twelfth place in the series standings. He also appeared in Formula Renault UK in twelve of the season's twenty races as a guest driver and the Formula Renault UK Finals Series, where he claimed two podiums and finished eighth overall.

=== Toyota Racing Series ===
Serrallés contested the Toyota Racing Series in January and February 2012 with Giles Motorsport, finishing ninth in the championship with a win at the New Zealand Grand Prix meeting at Manfield.

=== Formula Three ===
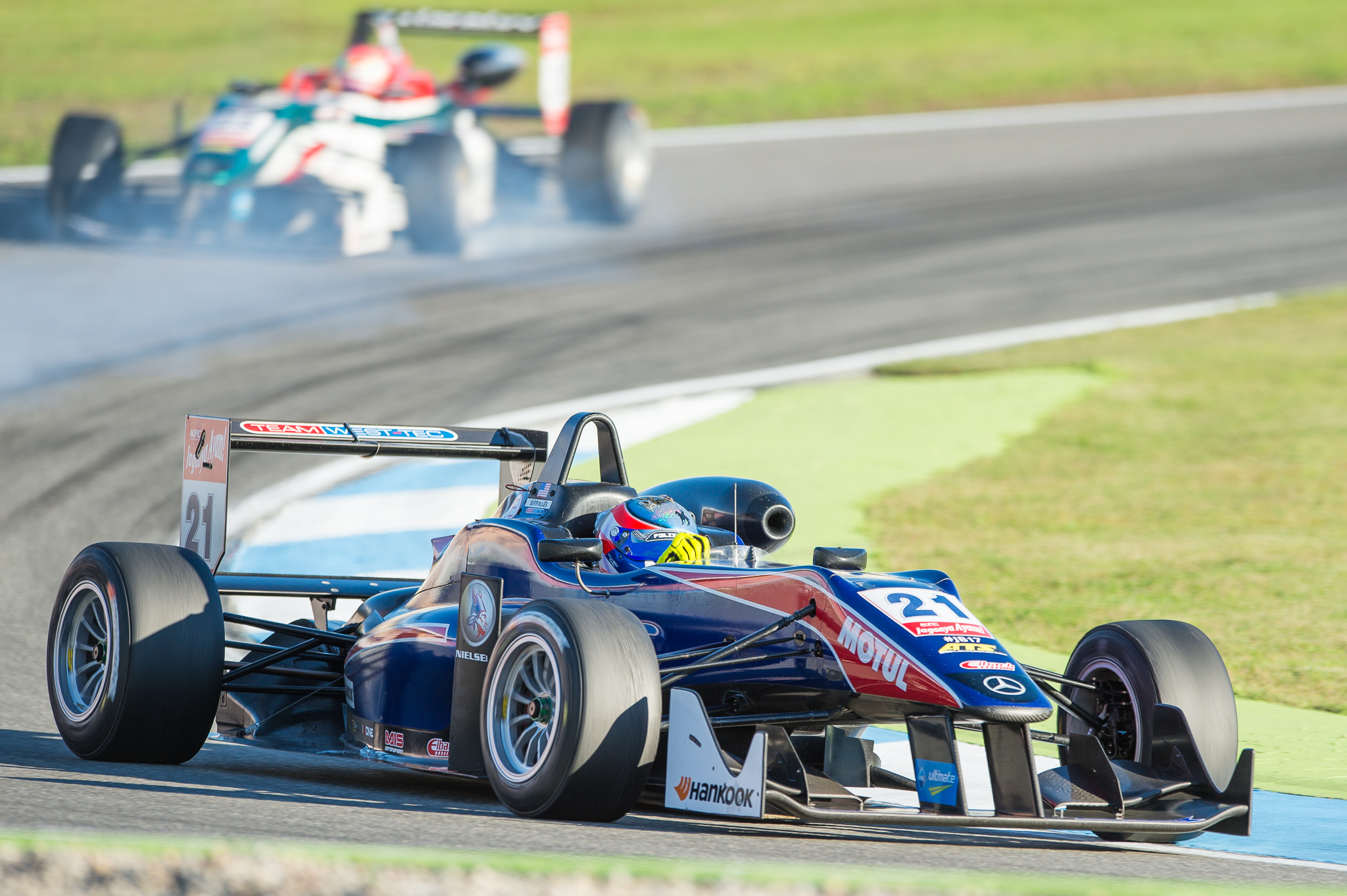
Felix Serralles in F3 - Hockenheimring 2014

On 4 January 2012, it was announced that Serrallés had rejoined Fortec Motorsports for a season in the British Formula 3 Championship. At the opening round of the season at Oulton Park, Serrallés qualified on the front row for the third race of the meeting, and after beating Carlin's Jack Harvey off the grid, Serrallés held his own in the lead and eventually claimed victory, becoming the first Puerto Rican to win in the series. He added a second victory a week later at Monza, winning the second race of the meeting in torrential rain.

=== Indy Lights ===
In 2015, Serallés drove for Belardi Auto Racing in the Indy Lights Series.

== Racing record ==
=== Career summary ===
Season	Series	Team	Races	Wins	Poles	FLaps	Podiums	Points	Position
2009	Skip Barber National Championship		4	0	0	0	0	40	10th
2010	Skip Barber National Championship		14	2	0	5	8	376	**3rd**
2010	U.S. F2000 National Championship	Liberty Motorsports	4	0	0	0	0	N/A	NC†
2010	F2000 Championship Series	GTP Motorsports	4	0	0	0	0	N/A	NC†
2010	Formula Renault UK Winter Series	Fortec Motorsport	4	0	0	0	0	N/A	NC†
2011	Eurocup Formula Renault 2.0	Fortec Motorsports	14	0	0	0	0	41	12th
2011	Formula Renault UK	Fortec Motorsports	12	0	0	0	2	N/A	NC†
2011	Formula Renault UK Finals Series	Fortec Motorsports	6	0	0	0	2	68	8th
2012	British Formula 3 Championship	Fortec Motorsports	28	5	3	5	13	299	**3rd**
2012	Toyota Racing Series	Giles Motorsport	12	1	0	0	2	547	8th
2013	FIA Formula 3 European Championship	Fortec Motorsports	29	0	0	1	2	104	11th
2013	British Formula 3 Championship	Fortec Motorsports	3	0	0	0	0	15	10th
2014	FIA Formula 3 European Championship	Team West-Tec	33	0	0	0	0	82	12th
2015	Indy Lights	Belardi Auto Racing	16	1	0	2	2	225	7th
2015	Masters of Formula 3	Jo Zeller Racing	1	0	0	0	0	N/A	12th
2015	FIA Formula 3 European Championship	kfzteile24 Mücke Motorsport	3	0	0	0	0	0	33rd
2016	Indy Lights	Carlin	18	2	0	2	5	311	6th
2017	Blancpain GT Series Sprint Cup	AKKA ASP	10	0	0	0	0	19	15th
2017	Blancpain GT Series Endurance Cup	AKKA ASP	5	1	1	0	1	41	6th
2017	Intercontinental GT Challenge	AKKA ASP	1	0	0	0	0	0	NC
2018	Blancpain GT Series Sprint Cup	AKKA ASP Team	4	0	0	0	0	19	11th

^{†} As Serrallés was a guest driver, he was ineligible for points.

=== Complete Formula Renault 2.0 NEC results ===
(key) (Races in bold indicate pole position) (Races in italics indicate fastest lap)

Year	Entrant	1	2	3	4	5	6	7	8	9	10	11	12	13	14	15	16	17	18	19	20	DC	Points
2011	Fortec Motorsports	HOC; 1	HOC; 2	HOC; 3	SPA; 1; 7	SPA; 2; 6	NÜR; 1	NÜR; 2	ASS; 1	ASS; 2	ASS; 3	OSC; 1	OSC; 2	ZAN; 1	ZAN; 2	MST; 1	MST; 2	MST; 3	MNZ; 1	MNZ; 2	MNZ; 3	NC†	0

† As Serrallés was a guest driver, he was inelligble for points

=== Complete Eurocup Formula Renault 2.0 results ===
(key) (Races in bold indicate pole position; races in italics indicate fastest lap)

Year	Entrant	1	2	3	4	5	6	7	8	9	10	11	12	13	14	DC	Points
2011	Fortec Motorsports	ALC; 1; 7	ALC; 2 Ret	SPA; 1; 7	SPA; 2; 6	NÜR; 1; 18	NÜR; 2; 6	HUN; 1; 30	HUN; 2; 9	SIL; 1; 15	SIL; 2; 7	LEC; 1; 32	LEC; 2; 10	CAT; 1; 8	CAT; 2; 15	12th	41

=== Complete FIA Formula 3 European Championship results ===
(key)

Year	Entrant	Engine	1	2	3	4	5	6	7	8	9	10	11	12	13	14	15	16	17	18	19	20	21	22	23	24	25	26	27	28	29	30	31	32	33	DC	Points
2013	Fortec Motorsports	Mercedes	MNZ; 1; 6	MNZ; 2; 7	MNZ; 3; 15	SIL; 1; 8	SIL; 2 DNS	SIL; 3; 4	HOC; 1; 2	HOC; 2; 5	HOC; 3; 2	BRH; 1; 16	BRH; 2; 15	BRH; 3; 16	RBR; 1 Ret	RBR; 2; 22	RBR; 3; 13	NOR; 1; 4	NOR; 2; 6	NOR; 3 Ret	NÜR; 1; 8	NÜR; 2; 8	NÜR; 3; 12	ZAN; 1 Ret	ZAN; 2 Ret	ZAN; 3; 15	VAL; 1 Ret	VAL; 2 Ret	VAL; 3 Ret	HOC; 1; 11	HOC; 2 DSQ	HOC; 3 Ret				11th	104
2014	Team West-Tec F3	Mercedes	SIL; 1; 7	SIL; 2; 15	SIL; 3; 10	HOC; 1; 8	HOC; 2; 8	HOC; 3 Ret	PAU; 1; 6	PAU; 2; 8	PAU; 3; 13	HUN; 1; 7	HUN; 2; 8	HUN; 3; 7	SPA; 1; 11	SPA; 2 Ret	SPA; 3; 4	NOR; 1; 8	NOR; 2; 11	NOR; 3; 13	MSC; 1; 9	MSC; 2; 10	MSC; 3 Ret	RBR; 1; 14	RBR; 2 Ret	RBR; 3 Ret	NÜR; 1; 12	NÜR; 2 Ret	NÜR; 3; 7	IMO; 1; 8	IMO; 2; 8	IMO; 3; 9	HOC; 1; 9	HOC; 2; 11	HOC; 3 Ret	12th	82
2015	kfzteile24 Mücke Motorsport	Mercedes	SIL; 1	SIL; 2	SIL; 3	HOC; 1	HOC; 2	HOC; 3	PAU; 1	PAU; 2	PAU; 3	MNZ; 1	MNZ; 2	MNZ; 3	SPA; 1	SPA; 2	SPA; 3	NOR; 1	NOR; 2	NOR; 3	ZAN; 1	ZAN; 2	ZAN; 3	RBR; 1	RBR; 2	RBR; 3	ALG; 1	ALG; 2	ALG; 3	NÜR; 1; 18	NÜR; 2 Ret	NÜR; 3; 15	HOC; 1	HOC; 2	HOC; 3	33rd	0

=== Indy Lights ===
Year	Team	1	2	3	4	5	6	7	8	9	10	11	12	13	14	15	16	17	18	Rank	Points	Ref
2015	Belardi Auto Racing	STP; 13	STP; 8	LBH; 3	ALA; 6	ALA; 4	IMS; 9	IMS; 11	INDY; 11	TOR; DSQ	TOR; 7	MIL; 1	IOW; 10	MOH; 10	MOH; 5	LAG; 13	LAG; 8			7th	225	
2016	Carlin	STP; 1	STP; 4	PHX; 7	ALA; 2	ALA; 15	IMS; 7	IMS; 5	INDY; 6	RDA; 3	RDA; 14	IOW; 1	TOR; 2	TOR; 10	MOH; 4	MOH; 10	WGL; 7	LAG; 8	LAG; 5	6th	311	

=== Complete Blancpain GT Series Sprint Cup results ===
Year	Team	Car	Class	1	2	3	4	5	6	7	8	9	10	Pos.	Points	Ref
2017	AKKA ASP	Mercedes-AMG GT3	Pro	MIS; QR; 5	MIS; CR; 4	BRH; QR; 4	BRH; CR; 27	ZOL; QR; 5	ZOL; CR; 24	HUN; QR; 15	HUN; CR; Ret	NÜR; QR; Ret	NÜR; CR; 19	15th	19	
2018	AKKA ASP Team	Mercedes-AMG GT3	Pro	ZOL; 1; 9	ZOL; 2; 4	BRH; 1; 5	BRH; 2; 6	MIS; 1	MIS; 2	HUN; 1	HUN; 2	NÜR; 1	NÜR; 2	11th	19	
