= Goddard (given name) =

Goddard is a given name. Notable people with the name include:

- Goddard Lieberson (1911–1977), American record producer and music industry executive
- Goddard Oxenbridge (died 1537), English landowner and administrator
- Goddard Pemberton (died 1616), English politician

== See also ==
- Goddard (surname)
