= 2013 Toyota Racing Series =

Motor racing competition

Seasons
- ← 2012 2014 →

The 2013 Toyota Racing Series was the ninth running of the Toyota Racing Series, the premier motorsport category for open-wheel cars, held in New Zealand. The series, which consisted of five meetings of three races, began on 12 January at Teretonga Park in Invercargill, and ended on 10 February with the 58th running of the New Zealand Grand Prix, at Manfeild Autocourse in Feilding.

For the second consecutive season, New Zealand's Nick Cassidy won the championship title, becoming the third driver to win multiple titles in the championship's history after Daniel Gaunt and Mitch Evans. Cassidy, driving for the M2 Competition team, claimed the title before the final race of the season at Manfeild, after a raft of post-race penalties were handed out after the second race. Among those was Cassidy's main championship rival, Giles Motorsport's Lucas Auer, who was given a 50-second penalty after he was adjudged to have forced Cassidy's team-mate Steijn Schothorst off the track, while passing him.

Despite only winning two races during the season – one at Hampton Downs as well as a second New Zealand Grand Prix victory – Cassidy was over 100 points clear in the final championship standings, having finished each of the fifteen races in the top eight. Second place in the standings was settled by six points; as three-time winner Alex Lynn (M2 Competition) moved ahead of Auer – a two-time winner – with a second-place finish in the New Zealand Grand Prix, to Auer's sixth place and Lynn prevailed 803 to 797. Schothorst finished fourth in the championship, taking one victory with a win in the first race at Manfeild, while the top five in the championship was rounded out by Bruno Bonifacio of Giles Motorsport, who won at Taupō and was the benefactor of Auer's penalty in the second Manfeild race. Three other drivers also won races during the season; Félix Serrallés won races at each of the first two meetings at Teretonga and Timaru, Pipo Derani also won a race at Teretonga, while Evans won two races on a one-off return to the series, at Hampton Downs, as he prepared for his GP2 Series campaign.

== Teams and drivers ==
From the 2012 season, six drivers returned for a full-time campaign during the 2013 season.

Defending champion Nick Cassidy moved teams for his bid for a second consecutive title; having won the championship in 2012 with Giles Motorsport, Cassidy moved to the M2 Competition squad for 2013, as part of a six-car team. Alex Lynn – who was a race-winner in the series in 2011 – also returned to New Zealand with M2, where they were joined by British Formula 3 rookie class champion Spike Goddard, British Formula Ford competitor Ryan Cullen, Formula Renault Eurocup racer Steijn Schothorst, and Norwegian karter Dennis Olsen, who was competing in single-seaters for the first time. Cullen left the series after the second round of the season at Timaru, while Pieter Schothorst, brother of Steijn, joined the team for the New Zealand Grand Prix.

Despite losing Cassidy to M2 Competition, Giles Motorsport entered a five-car squad for the Series. Lucas Auer, Bruno Bonifacio, and Félix Serrallés all remained with the team after finishing sixth, eighth and tenth respectively, in the 2012 championship. Serrallés' team-mate from British Formula 3, Pipo Derani, was also part of the team, while the team was completed by Nicholas Latifi, a race-winner in the final Italian Formula Three campaign. Two-time series champion Mitch Evans competed in a sixth car for the team at Hampton Downs, as he elected to compete in a one-off meeting in order to maintain his preparations for a 2013 campaign in the GP2 Series; his car was then filled for the New Zealand Grand Prix by Ken Smith, who maintained his record of competing in every New Zealand Grand Prix that the category had been eligible for, and his 48th New Zealand Grand Prix in total.

ETEC Motorsport also entered a five-car team for the 2013 season, just as they had done in 2012. Tanart Sathienthirakul was the team's only non-rookie driver, as he moved from the M2 Competition team for his second series campaign. He was joined in the team by European F3 Open driver Tatiana Calderón, the series' only female driver during the 2013 campaign. Akash Nandy, who contested part-campaigns in both Formula Pilota China and the JK Racing Asia Series in 2012, was also a member of the team – and the youngest driver of all, in the series – while the team was completed by Singaporean karter Andrew Tang, and British driver Jann Mardenborough, who was continuing his progression up the motorsport ladder since winning the 2011 Nissan GT Academy for budding racing drivers, implementing Sony's Gran Turismo racing series.

Victory Motor Racing was the only other team to enter the 2013 Toyota Racing Series, entering two cars for the majority of the season. Damon Leitch, who finished third in the championship in 2012, returned with the team, where he was joined by Michael Scott, who graduated from the national Formula First championship in New Zealand. The team entered a third car for the final two meetings of the season, which was filled by Italian driver Ignazio D'Agosto, who like the Schothorst brothers, had competed in the Formula Renault Eurocup and the Formula Renault NEC in 2012.

Team	No.	Driver	Status	Rounds
M2 Competition	1	(New Zealand) Nick Cassidy		All
M2 Competition	10	(Australia) Spike Goddard	R	All
M2 Competition	17	(Republic of Ireland) Ryan Cullen	R	1–2
M2 Competition	19	(Netherlands) Pieter Schothorst	R	5
M2 Competition	21	(Netherlands) Steijn Schothorst	R	All
M2 Competition	36	(United Kingdom) Alex Lynn	R	All
M2 Competition	44	(Norway) Dennis Olsen	R	All
Victory Motor Racing	3	(New Zealand) Damon Leitch		All
Victory Motor Racing	16	(Italy) Ignazio D'Agosto	R	4–5
Victory Motor Racing	53	(New Zealand) Michael Scott	R	All
Giles Motorsport	4	(Puerto Rico) Félix Serrallés		All
Giles Motorsport	5	(Brazil) Bruno Bonifacio		All
Giles Motorsport	6	(Brazil) Pipo Derani	R	All
Giles Motorsport	9	(New Zealand) Mitch Evans		4
Giles Motorsport	9	(New Zealand) Ken Smith		5
Giles Motorsport	11	(Austria) Lucas Auer		All
Giles Motorsport	18	(Canada) Nicholas Latifi	R	All
ETEC Motorsport	7	(Colombia) Tatiana Calderón	R	All
ETEC Motorsport	22	(Singapore) Andrew Tang	R	All
ETEC Motorsport	23	(United Kingdom) Jann Mardenborough	R	All
ETEC Motorsport	29	(Malaysia) Akash Nandy	R	All
ETEC Motorsport	43	(Thailand) Tanart Sathienthirakul		All

== Season review ==
At the opening round of the season at Teretonga, Lucas Auer took pole position for the opening race – as he had done in 2012 – after finishing fastest in the first qualifying session, which was held in dry conditions. By the time the second session had started, rain had started to fall and caused the drivers to take to the track on wet-weather tyres. By the end, Félix Serrallés had set a lap time three-tenths of a second quicker than anyone else to take pole for the feature race, the Spirit of a Nation. In the opening race, Auer led from start-to-finish to take his maiden win in the series, ahead of defending champion Nick Cassidy and Alex Lynn, who had swapped places from their starting positions. The top six positions were inverted for the reverse-grid race, where Pipo Derani repeated Auer's trait of the previous afternoon by leading from pole position to the chequered flag. He was followed home by Serrallés and Bruno Bonifacio; the latter's third place was short-lived as he was given a five-second time penalty for jumping the start, which promoted Lynn onto the podium. The Spirit of a Nation race saw Serrallés and Lynn lead away at the start, before the two drivers collided at the start of lap four; Lynn had tried to go around the outside of Serrallés into the first corner before the collision, which forced both drivers onto the grass. Lynn impacted with a tyre barrier, which sent his car into a barrel-roll before righting itself, and Lynn extricated himself from the wreckage. A red flag period followed, allowing Serrallés to return to the front of the field, where he remained for the rest of the race, to take the race victory and the championship lead. Auer finished second, while Steijn Schothorst achieved his first podium finish, in third.

Timaru hosted the second round of the championship, where Auer again qualified on pole position for the weekend's opening race, setting a time around a quarter of a second quicker than any of his rivals. Cassidy would join him on the front row, edging out Bonifacio by 0.001 seconds. Auer also achieved pole position for the feature race, the Timaru Herald Trophy; here he was quicker than Lynn by just over a tenth of a second, while Bonifacio again marginally missed out on the front row, by 0.002 seconds on this occasion. Auer once again recorded a lights-to-flag victory, in the first race, by a margin of over four seconds to Cassidy in fifteen laps, while Bonifacio ensured the top three finished in starting order, half a second in arrears of Cassidy. The top six were inverted once again for the reverse-grid race, which meant that Serrallés started from pole position ahead of Damon Leitch. Serrallés managed to fend off the advances of Leitch during the fifteen-lap race, and won by just under half a second to retake the championship lead from Auer, after the latter's opening win. Cassidy completed the podium, as he continued his consistent start to the season. Auer was overtaken at the start of the Timaru Herald Trophy by Lynn, and despite pressuring him for the entire race, he was not able to find a way back past him; Lynn won the race by just over a quarter of a second ahead of Auer, who regained the championship lead from Serrallés – who finished the race third – in the process.

At Taupo, Lynn locked out pole position in both qualifying sessions; he set the fastest time by half a tenth ahead of Cassidy in the first session, whereas in the second session – to set the grid for the Denny Hulme Memorial Trophy – Lynn's pole-setting margin was a far more comfortable three-tenths of a second, ahead of championship leader Auer. Lynn took a comfortable victory in the opening race, winning by nearly five seconds ahead of Cassidy, while the podium was completed by Schothorst. Auer extended his championship lead over Serrallés with a fifth-place finish, as the latter suffered a flat tyre during the race. The top four places were inverted for the reverse-grid race, with ultimately resorted into a battle between Bonifacio and Schothorst. Pulling almost fifteen seconds clear of the rest of the field, the duo battled for most of the race, with Bonifacio prevailing by around a second. Auer finished third ahead of Cassidy, who moved into second place in the championship. The Denny Hulme Memorial Trophy shook up the championship proceedings as Auer and Schothorst collided, causing Auer to pit. At the front, Lynn led every lap en route to victory, ahead of Cassidy and Bonifacio. Despite not winning a race at any of the meetings, Cassidy assumed the championship lead due to his consistency, ahead of Auer and Serrallés.

The following event at Hampton Downs saw the return of two-time series champion Mitch Evans, who after taking the 2012 GP3 Series title, was taking part in a one-off event to maintain race sharpness ahead of his GP2 Series campaign later in the season, with the Arden International team. Evans rejoined Giles Motorsport, the team he won both of his championship title with, and took a double pole position for the opening and closing races of the weekend. A somewhat surprising second in the first session with gamer-turned-racer Jann Mardenborough occupying the front row for race one, alongside Evans. Evans' pole-winning margin for race three was just 0.001 seconds – the closest margin in series history – ahead of Lynn. Championship leader Cassidy could only qualify sixth and seventh for the races. The first race had to be restarted after Bonifacio launched over the back of Mardenborough's car at the hairpin, eliminating himself from the race. After repairs, Mardenborough was able to line up on the grid once again; he ultimately fell down the order to sixth place, as Evans led home Lynn, Derani, Cassidy and Auer. The top four places were inverted for the race two grid, where Cassidy extended his points lead with his first victory of the season. He pulled clear of the field by over four seconds to win from Derani and Auer. The feature race, the New Zealand Motor Cup, was just as comfortable for Evans as it was in the opening race, leading from start to finish. Lynn finished second, while Cassidy further extended his championship advantage, ahead of Auer.

For the second season in a row, the championship concluded with the New Zealand Grand Prix meeting at Manfeild. No fewer than eight drivers had a mathematical chance of winning the championship title: Cassidy, Auer, Lynn, Schothorst, Serrallés, Derani, Leitch and Bonifacio. Lynn set the fastest time in the first two qualifying sessions, and thus guaranteeing himself pole position for the opening race of the weekend, the Dan Higgins Trophy. Auer set the fastest time during the third "super-pole" session, but Lynn took pole for the Grand Prix, with the second fastest time in the session combined with his times in the first two sessions. Schothorst would join Lynn on the front row for the Dan Higgins Trophy and Cassidy was alongside for the Grand Prix. In the Dan Higgins Trophy, Schothorst made the better start from second place on the grid, and moved ahead of Lynn on the opening lap. Schothorst held the lead until the end of the race, called three laps shy of its original distance after Mardenborough spun off the track, to take his first victory. Cassidy was second to further extend his points lead over Lynn and Auer, who were third and fourth. The top eight drivers were inverted for the race two grid, leaving Serrallés on pole position. Schothorst and Auer battled for position, with Auer forcing his rival off the track. Auer ultimately passed Bonifacio and Serrallés on-the-road, to take the victory, but was eventually given a 50-second penalty for dangerous driving. Bonifacio inherited the victory, ahead of Cassidy and Ignazio D'Agosto, after Serrallés and Derani were also given penalties. Cassidy's second place, coupled with Lynn finishing thirteenth after an early off, secured a second consecutive title. Cassidy cemented his title triumph with a second New Zealand Grand Prix victory in succession, leading every lap of the 35-lap race. Lynn finished second, and coupled with Auer finishing only sixth, was able to take the runner-up position in the standings. Auer finished a disgruntled third in the championship, stating that he would not return to the series unless there was "large commercial incentive in it" as a competitor. Schothorst completed the final podium of the season, as he sealed fourth in the championship standings.

== Race calendar and results ==
The calendar for the series was announced on 22 August 2012, with the calendar remaining unchanged from the 2012 season. Again, series organisers announced that the series would run over five successive weekends in January and February, culminating in the New Zealand Grand Prix meeting.

At each of the first four race weekends, two qualifying sessions were held in order to establish the grids for the first and third races of each meeting. The first fifteen-minute session establishes the grid for the opening race, while the second session of fifteen minutes established the grid for the final race of the meeting, denoted as the feature race. In between, the grid for the second race was established via a partially reversed grid and the conduction of a marble draw by the first race winner. Based upon the finishing positions of the first race, the grid could be inverted by either four, six or eight positions via the marble draw.

This format varied at the New Zealand Grand Prix meeting, as three fifteen-minute sessions were held. The starting order for the opening race of the meeting was established using the fastest time for each driver in either of the first two sessions. The second race would use a partially reversed grid as normal, while the grid order for the final race – the New Zealand Grand Prix itself – was to be established using an average of each driver's fastest lap in each session.

Round		Date	Circuit	Pole position	Fastest lap	Winning driver	Winning team	Round winner(s)
1	R1	12 January	Teretonga Park, Invercargill	(Austria) Lucas Auer	(Austria) Lucas Auer	(Austria) Lucas Auer	Giles Motorsport	(Puerto Rico) Félix Serrallés
1	R2	13 January	Teretonga Park, Invercargill		(New Zealand) Nick Cassidy	(Brazil) Pipo Derani	Giles Motorsport	(Puerto Rico) Félix Serrallés
1	R3	13 January	Teretonga Park, Invercargill	(Puerto Rico) Félix Serrallés	(Austria) Lucas Auer	(Puerto Rico) Félix Serrallés	Giles Motorsport	(Puerto Rico) Félix Serrallés
2	R1	19 January	Timaru International Motor Raceway, Timaru	(Austria) Lucas Auer	(Austria) Lucas Auer	(Austria) Lucas Auer	Giles Motorsport	(Austria) Lucas Auer
2	R2	20 January	Timaru International Motor Raceway, Timaru		(New Zealand) Nick Cassidy	(Puerto Rico) Félix Serrallés	Giles Motorsport	(Austria) Lucas Auer
2	R3	20 January	Timaru International Motor Raceway, Timaru	(Austria) Lucas Auer	(New Zealand) Nick Cassidy	(United Kingdom) Alex Lynn	M2 Competition	(Austria) Lucas Auer
3	R1	26 January	Taupo Motorsport Park, Taupō	(United Kingdom) Alex Lynn	(United Kingdom) Alex Lynn	(United Kingdom) Alex Lynn	M2 Competition	(United Kingdom) Alex Lynn (Brazil) Bruno Bonifacio
3	R2	27 January	Taupo Motorsport Park, Taupō		(Netherlands) Steijn Schothorst	(Brazil) Bruno Bonifacio	Giles Motorsport	(United Kingdom) Alex Lynn (Brazil) Bruno Bonifacio
3	R3	27 January	Taupo Motorsport Park, Taupō	(United Kingdom) Alex Lynn	(United Kingdom) Alex Lynn	(United Kingdom) Alex Lynn	M2 Competition	(United Kingdom) Alex Lynn (Brazil) Bruno Bonifacio
4	R1	2 February	Hampton Downs Motorsport Park, Waikato	(New Zealand) Mitch Evans	(New Zealand) Nick Cassidy	(New Zealand) Mitch Evans	Giles Motorsport	(New Zealand) Mitch Evans
4	R2	3 February	Hampton Downs Motorsport Park, Waikato		(New Zealand) Nick Cassidy	(New Zealand) Nick Cassidy	M2 Competition	(New Zealand) Mitch Evans
4	R3	3 February	Hampton Downs Motorsport Park, Waikato	(New Zealand) Mitch Evans	(New Zealand) Mitch Evans	(New Zealand) Mitch Evans	Giles Motorsport	(New Zealand) Mitch Evans
5	R1	9 February	Manfeild Autocourse, Feilding	(United Kingdom) Alex Lynn	(United Kingdom) Alex Lynn	(Netherlands) Steijn Schothorst	M2 Competition	(New Zealand) Nick Cassidy
5	R2	10 February	Manfeild Autocourse, Feilding		(Austria) Lucas Auer	(Brazil) Bruno Bonifacio	Giles Motorsport	(New Zealand) Nick Cassidy
5	R3	10 February	Manfeild Autocourse, Feilding	(Austria) Lucas Auer	(New Zealand) Nick Cassidy	(New Zealand) Nick Cassidy	M2 Competition	(New Zealand) Nick Cassidy

== Championship standings ==
In order for a driver to score championship points, they had to complete at least 90% of the race winner's distance. All races counted towards the final championship standings.

Scoring system

Position	1st	2nd	3rd	4th	5th	6th	7th	8th	9th	10th	11th	12th	13th	14th	15th	16th	17th	18th	19th	20th
Points	75	67	60	54	49	45	42	39	36	33	30	28	26	24	22	20	18	16	14	12

Pos	Driver	TER			TIM			TAU			HMP			MAN			Points
1	(New Zealand) Nick Cassidy	2	4	8	2	3	7	2	4	2	4	1	3	2	2	1	915
2	(United Kingdom) Alex Lynn	3	3	Ret	7	6	1	**1**	8	**1**	2	5	2	**3**	15	**2**	803
3	(Austria) Lucas Auer	**1**	5	2	**1**	5	**2**	5	3	16	5	3	4	4	14	6	797
4	(Netherlands) Steijn Schothorst	8	6	3	4	17	4	3	2	4	8	7	10	1	4	3	754
5	(Brazil) Bruno Bonifacio	5	7	4	3	4	Ret	4	1	3	Ret	9	Ret	7	1	5	650
6	(Puerto Rico) Félix Serrallés	4	2	**1**	6	1	3	16	9	6	9	12	Ret	8	11	9	646
7	(Brazil) Pipo Derani	6	1	5	8	7	8	Ret	15	14	3	2	9	6	12	4	625
8	(New Zealand) Damon Leitch	10	8	6	5	2	5	7	7	5	17	11	12	12	8	11	588
9	(Canada) Nicholas Latifi	7	10	10	9	8	6	13	16	7	11	8	7	11	17	12	503
10	(United Kingdom) Jann Mardenborough	11	9	7	10	9	9	6	12	12	6	6	Ret	Ret	6	7	491
11	(Thailand) Tanart Sathienthirakul	9	12	12	11	10	13	14	13	11	13	10	5	10	9	14	462
12	(Colombia) Tatiana Calderón	12	11	11	12	16	11	8	5	13	12	13	14	15	13	13	432
13	(Norway) Dennis Olsen	15	15	16	14	11	12	9	10	8	7	Ret	8	13	5	Ret	410
14	(Malaysia) Akash Nandy	14	13	9	18	12	10	10	6	15	Ret	14	Ret	18	7	18	361
15	(Singapore) Andrew Tang	17	18	13	17	15	14	11	Ret	9	10	Ret	6	14	16	10	345
16	(New Zealand) Michael Scott	16	16	15	15	14	16	15	14	10	16	15	13	17	Ret	15	315
17	(Australia) Spike Goddard	13	14	Ret	13	Ret	15	12	11	Ret	15	16	11	16	Ret	19	262
18	(New Zealand) Mitch Evans										**1**	4	**1**				204
19	(Italy) Ignazio D'Agosto										14	Ret	15	9	3	8	181
20	(Republic of Ireland) Ryan Cullen	18	17	14	16	13	17										122
21	(Netherlands) Pieter Schothorst													5	Ret	17	67
22	(New Zealand) Ken Smith													19	10	16	67
Pos	Driver	TER			TIM			TAU			HMP			MAN			Points

Colour	Result
Gold	Winner
Silver	Second place
Bronze	Third place
Green	Points classification
Blue	Non-points classification
Blue	Non-classified finish (NC)
Purple	Retired, not classified (Ret)
Red	Did not qualify (DNQ)
Red	Did not pre-qualify (DNPQ)
Black	Disqualified (DSQ)
White	Did not start (DNS)
White	Withdrew (WD)
White	Race cancelled (C)
Blank	Did not practice (DNP)
Blank	Did not arrive (DNA)
Blank	Excluded (EX)

**Bold** – Pole
Italics – Fastest Lap
