= Spike Goddard =

Australian racing driver

Richard Goddard
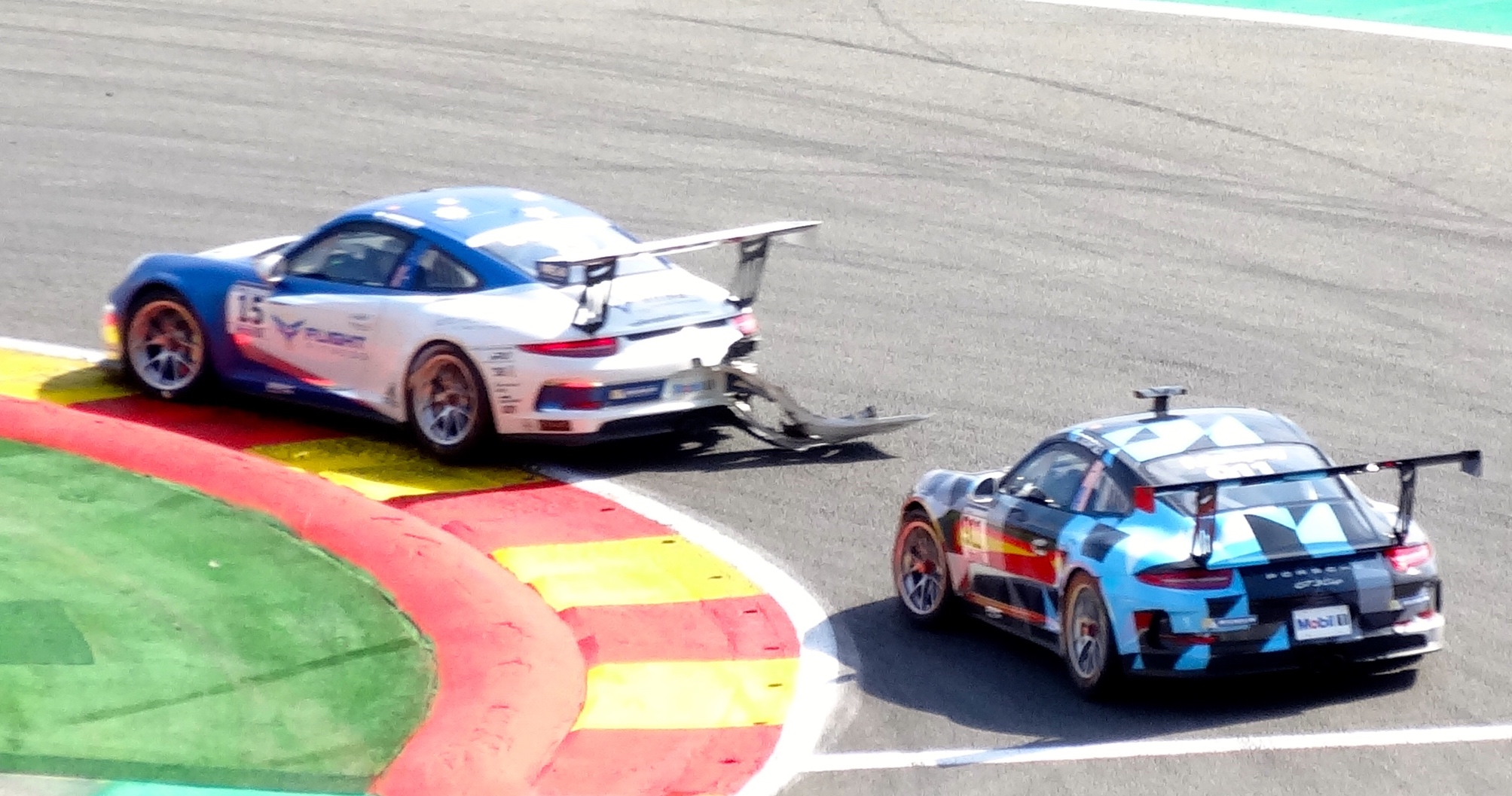
- Richard Goddard (#15) & Patrick Dempsey (#911), in Porsche Supercup, Spa 2015.
- Nationality: (Australia) Australian (United States) American
- Born: Richard Charles Goddard; 17 August 1992 (age 34) Johnstown, Pennsylvania, U.S.

Lamborghini Super Trofeo Middle East - Pro career
- Debut season: 2017
- Current team: FFF Racing Team by ACM
- Categorisation: FIA Silver

Previous series
- 2015 2013-14 2013 2012 2011 2010: Porsche Supercup; FIA European Formula 3 Toyota Racing Series; British F3 Rookie Class; British Formula Ford; Formula Ford Victoria

Championship titles
- 2012: British F3 Rookie Class

Richard Charles "Spike" Goddard (born 17 August 1992) is an Australian racing driver.

== Career ==
=== Karting ===
Goddard began his racing career in karting at the age of fourteen and raced in his native Australia.

=== Formula Ford ===
In 2009, Goddard graduated to single–seaters into the Australian Formula Ford NSW Series, competing in the final three races. For the next year, Goddard also competed in Formula Ford Victoria series in Australia. He finished this championship on the third place.

Goddard decided to move in United Kingdom to contest in British Formula Ford Championship in 2011 with Jamun Racing. He had nineteen point-scoring finishes in 24 races and finally finished tenth.

=== Formula Three ===
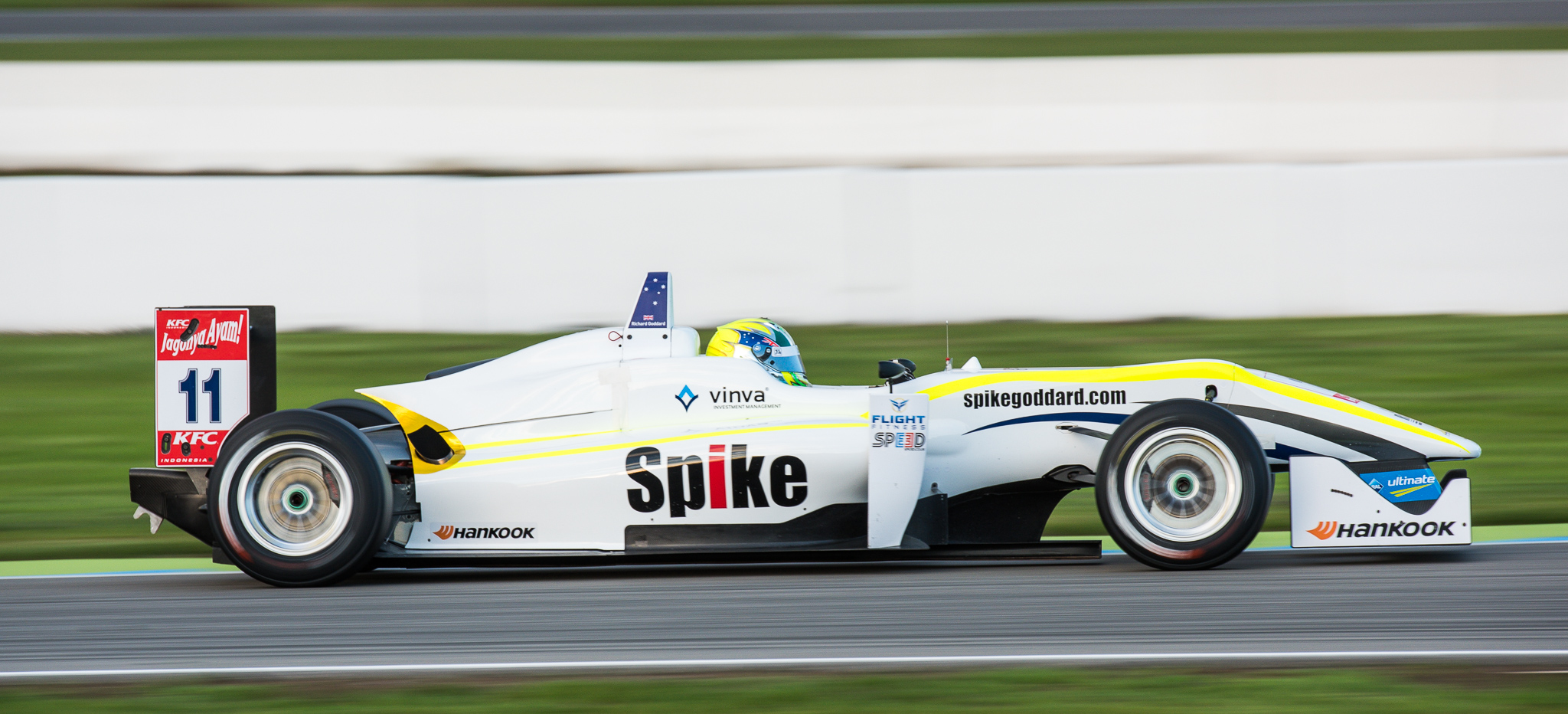
Spike Goddard in F3 - Hockenheimring 2014

In 2012, Goddard graduated to the Rookie Class of the British Formula 3 Championship, competing for ThreeBond with T-Sport. Fellow Australian racer Duvashen Padayachee was his only rival in this, because only Goddard and Padayachee raced the season full-time. The other four drivers competed in less than half the season. Goddard took the championship title with 49-point advantage on Padayachee.

Goddard will continue his collaboration for ThreeBond with T-Sport, competing in FIA European Formula Three Championship full-time in 2013.

=== Toyota Racing Series ===
Goddard participated in the Toyota Racing Series in early 2013 with M2 Competition.

=== Formula One ===
Goddard test drove the 2014 Force India F1 car on the second day of the post season test at Yas Marina Circuit, in Abu Dhabi. He had a "solid day's running"

== Racing record ==
=== Career summary ===
Season	Series	Team	Races	Wins	Poles	F/laps	Podiums	Points	Position
2010	Formula Ford Victoria	Anglo Australian Motorsport	?	?	?	?	?	?	**3rd**
2011	British Formula Ford	Jamun Racing	23	0	0	0	0	246	10th
2011	Formula Ford EuroCup	Jamun Racing	11	0	0	0	0	N/A	N/A
2011	Formula Ford Festival	Jamun Racing	1	0	0	0	0	N/A	15th
2012	British Formula 3 International Series - Rookie	ThreeBond with T-Sport	28	12	11	14	23	427	**1st**
2012	FIA Formula 3 European Championship	ThreeBond with T-Sport	8	0	0	0	0	0	NC†
2012	Masters of Formula 3	ThreeBond with T-Sport	1	0	0	0	0	N/A	17th
2013	Toyota Racing Series	M2 Competition	15	0	0	0	0	262	17th
2013	FIA Formula 3 European Championship	ThreeBond with T-Sport	30	0	0	0	0	0	31st
2013	British Formula 3 International Series	ThreeBond with T-Sport	3	0	0	0	1	14	12th
2013	Masters of Formula 3	ThreeBond with T-Sport	1	0	0	0	0	N/A	14th
2014	FIA Formula 3 European Championship	ThreeBond with T-Sport	30	0	0	0	0	3	23rd
2014	Formula One	Force India	Test driver						
2015	Porsche Supercup	MRS GT-Racing	10	0	0	0	0	21	16th
2015	Porsche Carrera Cup Germany - Class A	TECE MRS GT-Racing	17	0	0	0	0	22	17th
2015	Australian Carrera Cup Championship	Spike Racing	4	0	0	0	0	44	27th
2017	Lamborghini Super Trofeo Middle East - Pro	FFF Racing Team by ACM	6	0	0	1	6	72 *	**2nd** *
2017	Lamborghini Super Trofeo Asia - Pro	FFF Racing Team	6	0	0	0	2	49	7th
2017	Lamborghini Super Trofeo Asia - Pro-Am	FFF Racing Team	6	1	1	0	4	60	4th

^{†} Guest driver, he was ineligible for points.
^{*} Season still in progress.

=== Complete FIA Formula 3 European Championship results ===
(key)

Year	Entrant	Engine	1	2	3	4	5	6	7	8	9	10	11	12	13	14	15	16	17	18	19	20	21	22	23	24	25	26	27	28	29	30	31	32	33	DC	Points
2012	ThreeBond with T-Sport	Mugen-Honda	HOC; 1	HOC; 2	PAU; 1; 17	PAU; 2; 20	BRH; 1	BRH; 2	RBR; 1	RBR; 2	NOR; 1; 17	NOR; 2; 17	SPA; 1; 28	SPA; 2; 24	NÜR; 2; 17	NÜR; 3; 11	ZAN; 1	ZAN; 2	VAL; 1	VAL; 2	HOC; 1	HOC; 2														NC†	0†
2013	ThreeBond with T-Sport	ThreeBond Nissan	MNZ; 1; 15	MNZ; 2; 24	MNZ; 3; 19	SIL; 1; 23	SIL; 2; 15	SIL; 3 Ret	HOC; 1; 27	HOC; 2; 24	HOC; 3 Ret	BRH; 1; 15	BRH; 2; 21	BRH; 3; 18	RBR; 1; 24	RBR; 2; 18	RBR; 3; 16	NOR; 1; 19	NOR; 2; 24	NOR; 3; 16	NÜR; 1; 21	NÜR; 2; 21	NÜR; 3 Ret	ZAN; 1; 18	ZAN; 2; 18	ZAN; 3; 16	VAL; 1; 25	VAL; 2; 17	VAL; 3; 15	HOC; 1; 22	HOC; 2; 20	HOC; 3; 20				31st	0
2014	ThreeBond with T-Sport	NBE	SIL; 1; 14	SIL; 2 Ret	SIL; 3; 21	HOC; 1; 10	HOC; 2; 24	HOC; 3; 12	PAU; 1; 9	PAU; 2 Ret	PAU; 3 Ret	HUN; 1; 16	HUN; 2; 23	HUN; 3; 22	SPA; 1; 12	SPA; 2; 15	SPA; 3; 22	NOR; 1; 17	NOR; 2 Ret	NOR; 3; 14	MSC; 1 WD	MSC; 2 WD	MSC; 3 WD	RBR; 1; 21	RBR; 2 Ret	RBR; 3; 17	NÜR; 1; 19	NÜR; 2; 15	NÜR; 3; 17	IMO; 1; 15	IMO; 2; 18	IMO; 3; 19	HOC; 1; 20	HOC; 2; 21	HOC; 3; 12	23rd	3

^{†} Guest driver, he was ineligible for points.

=== Complete Porsche Supercup results ===
(key) (Races in bold indicate pole position) (Races in italics indicate fastest lap)

Year	Team	1	2	3	4	5	6	7	8	9	10	11	DC	Points
2015	MRS GT-Racing	ESP; 17	MON; 15	AUT; 15	GBR; 12	HUN; 15	BEL; 16	BEL; 24	ITA; 13	ITA; 15	USA; C	USA; 18	16th	21

Sporting positions
Preceded by Kotaro Sakurai	British Formula 3 Rookie Champion; 2012	Succeeded by Sun Zheng
