= John Goddard =

John Goddard may refer to:

- John Goddard (engraver) (fl. 1645–1671), English engraver
- John Goddard (cricketer) (1919–1987), West Indian cricketer
- Johnathan Goddard (1981–2008), American football player
- John Goddard (adventurer) (1924–2013), American adventurer, explorer and lecturer
- John Goddard (bishop) (born 1947), bishop of Burnley
- John Frederick Goddard (1795–1866), English chemist
- John Theodore Goddard (1879–1952), English solicitor appointed by Wallis Simpson as an adviser during her divorce proceedings
- John Goddard (footballer) (born 1993), English footballer currently playing for Slough Town
- John Goddard (actor) (born 1927), American film and television actor

== See also ==
- Jon Goddard (born 1982), English rugby player
- John Godard (disambiguation)
