= Julia Goddard =

Children's writer and animal welfare campaigner (1825–1896)

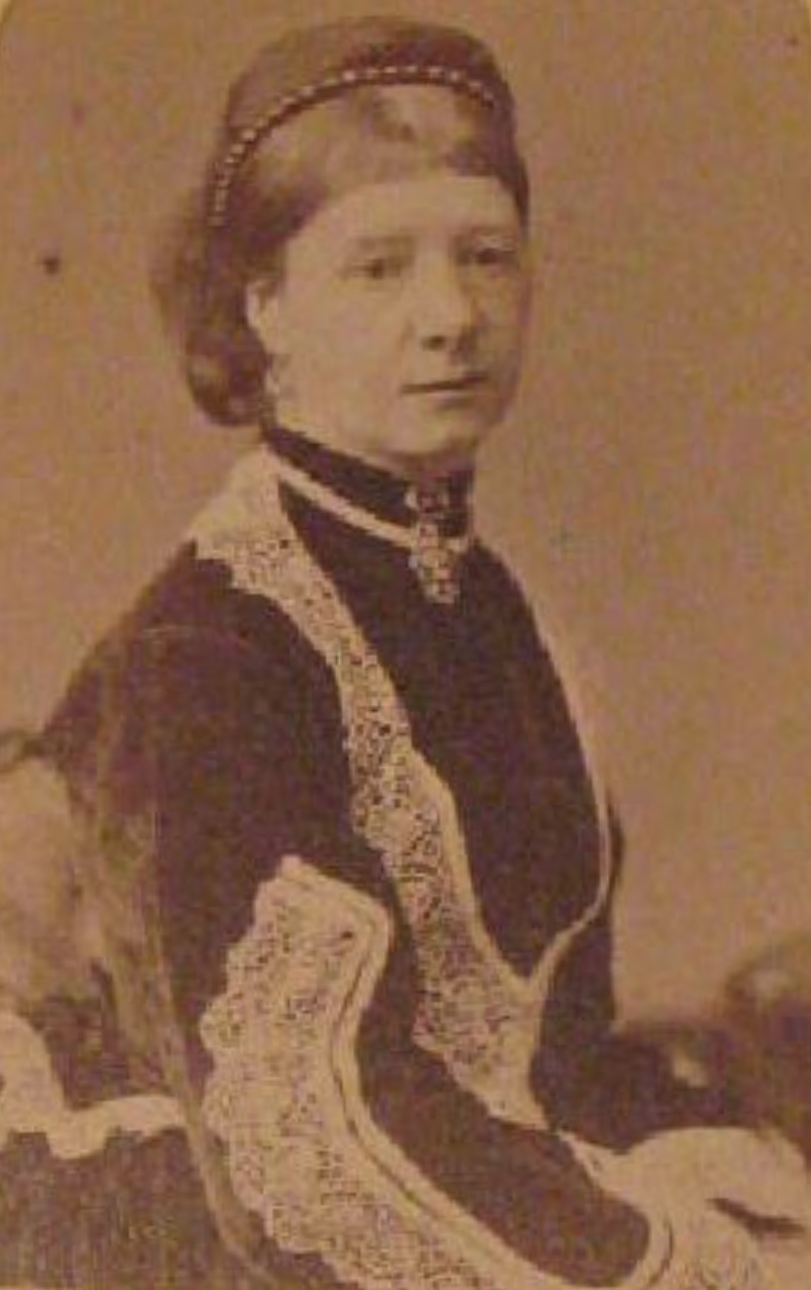
- Born: Julia Bachope Goddard; 11 July 1825; Birmingham, England
- Died: 30 September 1896 (aged 71); Little Aston, Warwickshire, England
- Occupations: Children's writer, animal welfare campaigner, journalist and artist.

Julia Bachope Goddard (11 July 1825 – 30 September 1896), was an English children's writer of more than 25 books, animal welfare campaigner, journalist and artist.

== Early life ==
She was born in Birmingham, England, on 11 July 1825, the eldest daughter in a family of ten children of Samuel Aspinwall Goddard (1796–1886) and his wife, Jemima Goddard, née Bachope (1800–1875). Samuel Aspinwall Goddard was born in Brookline, Massachusetts in the United States.

In about 1820, her father moved to Birmingham, where he was a gun manufacturer and iron merchant and exhibited at the 1851 The Great Exhibition. He also wrote pamphlets on free trade and currency reform and ran a multi-year writing campaign in The Birmingham Daily Post and The Times of London to try to convince the British public and parliament to side with the Union in the US Civil War. The family were very political, but neither Julia or Samuel ever ran for public office. He was the United States' consul in Birmingham, and later became a naturalized British subject.

== Career ==
In 1863, Goddard published her first children's book, Karl and the Six Little Dwarfs, and at least a further twenty-five were published over the rest of her career.

Many of her books concentrated on animal welfare, itself mirroring her long-term commitment to helping animals receive more humane treatment, more "moderate humanitarianism", than the "more radical elements in the animal rights' movements or anti-vivisection". According to a contemporary account in the Animals' Friend, Goddard was "one of the hardest and yet most unpretentious workers the movement has yet possessed".

== Personal life ==
Goddard never married.

== Later life ==
Goddard suffered from extremely poor health from 1894 onwards after a severe case of influenza, and together with her failing eyesight, she had to stop writing.

She lived with her sister, Fanny Delavan Goddard, in a cottage in Little Aston, near Sutton Coldfield, Warwickshire. She died at her cottage as a result of a cerebral haemorrhage on 30 September 1896.

== Selected publications ==
- Karl and the Six Little Dwarfs (1863)
- More Stories (1863)
- The Boy and the Constellations (1866)
- Wonderful Stories from Northern Lands (1871)
- The Golden Journey and Other Verses (1875)
- The Four Cats of the Tippertons and Other Stories About Animals (1881)
- New Boy At Merton
- The Search For The Gral
- Poems And Translations
- Heard At Last
- The Golden Weathercock
- Brave Dorette
- Mr. Lipcombe's Apples
- Fairy Tales Of Other Lands
- Joyce Dormers Story Vol 1
- Joyce Dormers Story Vol 2
- Thorns And Roses
- Pride Comes Before A Fall
- Song Book For Infants
- The Birds Nest and other Songs For Children
- Alison Brands Battle For Life
- John Gardiner's Neighbours
- Kasper And The Summer Fairies
- Titurel
- What Will She Do?
