= George "Sonny" Goddard =

George "Sonny" Goddard (28 April 1924 – 18 January 1988) was a steelpan enthusiast and President of the Steelband Association. He is still recognized for his work with the steelpan.

"In 1967, George ‘Sonny’ Goddard, a steelband leader and pioneer, wrote to Pope Paul VI requesting permission for steelband music in Roman Catholic churches in Trinidad. The Pope returned the petition to the Diocese for further consideration. When the final decision was made, it marked the end of stigma and discrimination towards the steelband movement and the beginning of the acceptance of the steelpan and its musicians as legitimate members of society and the Church." https://catholictt.org/2024/08/08/a-short-history-of-pan-in-church/

== Person ==
George Goddard was born in East Dry River and raised in New Town, a district of Port of Spain, Trinidad. He became committed to reforming the steelband movement and worked for several decades on this goal, facing government opposition and at one point losing his job. He documented his efforts in a book, Forty Years in the Steelbands 1939 to 1979. Goddard was a president of the Steelband Association, where he advocated for it as a respectable instrument. He was also chairman of the Association from 1957.
