= Godard (composer) =

French composer

Godard, sometimes spelled Godart or Goddart, (fl. 1536 – c. 1560) was a 16th-century French composer. Nineteen chansons are attributed to him. These were published in Paris between the years 1536 and 1559. Most of his songs are written in a style similar to Clément Janequin and Pierre Passereau. His best known work is the chanson "Ce moys de May" which has been republished numerous times, and included in books for multiple instruments; including arramgements for the lute, the organ, and the cittern.

Little is known for certain about the Godard. Some scholars have speculated that he may be the same man as the Robert Godard who was organist at the Beauvais Cathedral from 1540 through 1560, or that he may have been the tenor Goddart who was employed at the Sainte-Chapelle in Paris from 1541 through 1568. A third possibility is that he was the organist Georges Godart who was employed as organist at the Saint-Nicolas-du-Chardonnet in the 16th century. None of these assertions are provable, and it is possible that he may be an entirely different person.

== Chansons ==
- "Quant je vouldrois de vous me puys venger" (1536)
- "Ha quel tourment" (1538)
- "Hélas amour, je pensoye bien avoir" (1538)
- "O doulx revoir que mon esprit contente" (1538)
- "Mariez-moy mon pere" (1538)
- "Longtemps y a que langueur et tristesse" (1543)
- "Le doulx regard" (1544)
- "Amour pence que je dorme et je meurs" (1546)
- "Mon cueur avez que ung aultre" (1546)
- "De varier c’est ung propre de femme" (1546)
- "Voz huys, sont-ilz tous fermez, fillettes" (1547)
- "J’ay le fruict tant désiré" (1550)
- "Dieu tout puissant bon pere" (1553)
- "Graces à Dieu à ce point je consens" (1553)
- "L’homme est heureux quand il trouve amitié" (1553)
- "Puisqu’ainsi est que tous ceux qui ont la vie" (1559)
- "Que gagnés vous à vouloir differer" (1561)
- "Ce moys de May sur la rousée" (?, published in 1899)
- "Hault le boys m’amye" (?, republished in 1926)
