= 2011 Formula Renault 2.0 UK Championship =

Seasons
- ← 2010 none →

The 2011 Formula Renault 2.0 UK Championship is a multi-event motor racing championship for open wheel, formula racing cars held across England. The championship features a mix of professional motor racing teams and privately funded drivers competing in 2 litre Formula Renault single seat race cars that conform to the technical regulations for the championship. It forms part of the extensive program of support categories built up around the BTCC centrepiece. This season will be the 23rd British Formula Renault Championship.

The season began at Brands Hatch on 3 April and ended on 16 October at Silverstone, after twenty rounds held in England. From the World Series meeting at Silverstone, the series was sponsored by Certina Kurth Frères and presented as the CERTINA Formula Renault 2.0 UK Championship.

== Teams and drivers ==
2011 Entry List
Team	No.	Driver name	Class	Rounds
Fortec Motorsports; Fortec Competition	0	(Puerto Rico) Félix Serrallés		1, 4, 6–7, 9–10
Fortec Motorsports; Fortec Competition	7	(Bolivia) Pedro Pablo Calbimonte		1–7
Fortec Motorsports; Fortec Competition	7	(United Kingdom) Alex Walker	G	9
Fortec Motorsports; Fortec Competition	7	(United Arab Emirates) Ed Jones	G	10
Fortec Motorsports; Fortec Competition	10	(United Kingdom) Alex Walker	G	8
Fortec Motorsports; Fortec Competition	23	(United Kingdom) Will Stevens		1, 6
Fortec Motorsports; Fortec Competition	25	(Australia) Mitchell Gilbert	G	1–5, 7–10
Fortec Motorsports; Fortec Competition	29	(United Arab Emirates) Ed Jones	G	6, 9
Fortec Motorsports; Fortec Competition	36	(United Kingdom) Alex Lynn		All
Fortec Motorsports; Fortec Competition	44	(United Kingdom) Oliver Rowland	G	All
Manor Competition	2	(United Kingdom) Ollie Millroy		1–4
Manor Competition	3	(United Kingdom) Josh Hill		All
Manor Competition	5	(United Kingdom) Alice Powell	G	All
Manor Competition	42	(United Kingdom) Jordan King	G	All
Atech Reid GP	11	(United Kingdom) Oscar King	G	1–8, 10
Atech Reid GP	12	(United Kingdom) Jack Hawksworth		5–8
Atech Reid GP	12	(Australia) Geoff Uhrhane		9
Atech Reid GP	16	(United Kingdom) Dan Wells		3–10
Atech Reid GP	28	(Cyprus) Tio Ellinas		All
Antel Motorsport	18	(United Kingdom) Dan Wells		1–2
Mark Burdett Motorsport	21	(United Kingdom) Jack Hawksworth		1–4, 9–10
Mark Burdett Motorsport	22	(United Kingdom) Daniel Cammish		4–10

Icon	Class
G	Graduate Cup

== Race calendar and results ==
The series will support the British Touring Car Championship at all rounds except Knockhill, as Formula Renault forms part of the World Series by Renault meeting two weeks earlier, at Silverstone. All races were held in United Kingdom.

Round		Circuit	Date	Pole position	Fastest lap	Winning driver	Winning team
1	R1	Brands Hatch (Indy), Kent	3 April	(United Kingdom) Alex Lynn	(United Kingdom) Ollie Millroy	(United Kingdom) Alex Lynn	Fortec Motorsports
1	R2	Brands Hatch (Indy), Kent	3 April	(United Kingdom) Alex Lynn	(United Kingdom) Alex Lynn	(United Kingdom) Alex Lynn	Fortec Motorsports
2	R3	Donington Park, Leicestershire	17 April	(United Kingdom) Alex Lynn	(United Kingdom) Jack Hawksworth	(United Kingdom) Alex Lynn	Fortec Motorsports
2	R4	Donington Park, Leicestershire	17 April	(Cyprus) Tio Ellinas	(United Kingdom) Alex Lynn	(Cyprus) Tio Ellinas	Atech Reid GP
3	R5	Thruxton Circuit, Hampshire	30 April	(United Kingdom) Alex Lynn	(United Kingdom) Alex Lynn	(United Kingdom) Alex Lynn	Fortec Motorsports
3	R6	Thruxton Circuit, Hampshire	1 May	(United Kingdom) Alex Lynn	(United Kingdom) Alex Lynn	(United Kingdom) Alex Lynn	Fortec Motorsports
4	R7	Oulton Park, Cheshire	5 June	(United Kingdom) Alex Lynn	(United Kingdom) Alex Lynn	(United Kingdom) Alex Lynn	Fortec Motorsports
4	R8	Oulton Park, Cheshire	5 June	(United Kingdom) Alex Lynn	(United Kingdom) Alex Lynn	(United Kingdom) Alex Lynn	Fortec Motorsports
5	R9	Croft Circuit, North Yorkshire	18 June	(United Kingdom) Jack Hawksworth	(United Kingdom) Jack Hawksworth	(United Kingdom) Jack Hawksworth	Atech Reid GP
5	R10	Croft Circuit, North Yorkshire	19 June	(United Kingdom) Alex Lynn	(United Kingdom) Jack Hawksworth	(Australia) Mitchell Gilbert	Fortec Motorsports
6	R11	Snetterton Motor Racing Circuit, Norfolk	7 August	(United Kingdom) Jordan King	(United Kingdom) Jordan King	(Cyprus) Tio Ellinas	Atech Reid GP
6	R12	Snetterton Motor Racing Circuit, Norfolk	7 August	(United Kingdom) Alex Lynn	(Cyprus) Tio Ellinas	(United Kingdom) Alex Lynn	Fortec Motorsports
7	R13	Silverstone (Arena GP) Circuit, Northamptonshire	21 August	(United Kingdom) Alex Lynn	(United Kingdom) Alex Lynn	(United Kingdom) Alex Lynn	Fortec Motorsports
7	R14	Silverstone (Arena GP) Circuit, Northamptonshire	21 August	(United Kingdom) Alex Lynn	(United Kingdom) Alex Lynn	(United Kingdom) Alex Lynn	Fortec Motorsports
8	R15	Rockingham Motor Speedway, Northamptonshire	18 September	(United Kingdom) Oliver Rowland	(United Kingdom) Oliver Rowland	(United Kingdom) Oliver Rowland	Fortec Motorsports
8	R16	Rockingham Motor Speedway, Northamptonshire	18 September	(United Kingdom) Alex Lynn	(United Kingdom) Alex Lynn	(United Kingdom) Alex Lynn	Fortec Motorsports
9	R17	Brands Hatch (GP), Kent	2 October	(United Kingdom) Oliver Rowland	(United Kingdom) Oliver Rowland	(United Kingdom) Oliver Rowland	Fortec Motorsports
9	R18	Brands Hatch (GP), Kent	2 October	(United Kingdom) Oliver Rowland	(United Kingdom) Oliver Rowland	(United Kingdom) Oliver Rowland	Fortec Motorsports
10	R19	Silverstone (National), Northamptonshire	16 October	(United Kingdom) Alex Lynn	(United Kingdom) Alex Lynn	(United Kingdom) Alex Lynn	Fortec Motorsports
10	R20	Silverstone (National), Northamptonshire	16 October	(United Kingdom) Alex Lynn	(United Kingdom) Oliver Rowland	(United Kingdom) Oliver Rowland	Fortec Motorsports

== Championship standings ==
=== Drivers' Championship ===
- Points were awarded on a 32-28-25-22-20-18-16-14-12-11-10-9-8-7-6-5-4-3-2-1 basis, with 2 points for fastest lap. A driver's 18 best results counted towards the championship.

Pos	Driver	BHI		DON		THR		OUL		CRO		SNE		SIL		ROC		BHGP		SIL		Pts
Pos	Driver	1	2	3	4	5	6	7	8	9	10	11	12	13	14	15	16	17	18	19	20	Pts
1	(United Kingdom) Alex Lynn	1	1	1	2	1	1	1	1	5	DSQ	3	1	1	1	10	1	2	9	1	9	521
2	(United Kingdom) Oliver Rowland (G)	5	Ret	3	3	3	3	4	2	3	Ret	4	7	5	2	1	2	1	1	2	1	475
3	(Cyprus) Tio Ellinas	3	2	2	1	2	2	3	4	2	6	1	3	4	5	3	3	3	2	4	4	475
4	(United Kingdom) Jack Hawksworth	6	3	4	4	6	7	2	Ret	1	Ret	2	Ret	12	7	Ret	4	6	11	5	6	333
5	(Australia) Mitchell Gilbert (G)	Ret	6	8	Ret	5	6	10	3	6	1			9	4	2	6	7	10	6	2	317
6	(United Kingdom) Daniel Cammish							7	9	8	5	5	6	3	6	5	5	5	3	3	3	285
7	(United Kingdom) Josh Hill	9	7	6	7	11	4	8	7	4	Ret	8	5	11	12	Ret	Ret	8	6	8	5	273
8	(United Kingdom) Jordan King (G)	8	9	7	8	10	10	Ret	10	9	2	Ret	8	8	9	9	7	4	12	7	8	265
9	(United Kingdom) Alice Powell (G)	7	12	9	5	Ret	Ret	9	6	10	Ret	7	4	6	8	7	8	9	8	11	10	258
10	(United Kingdom) Dan Wells	13	11	10	Ret	8	8	6	Ret	7	7	10	11	10	11	4	10	11	4	9	7	251
11	(United Kingdom) Oscar King (G)	11	8	11	9	9	9	5	Ret	11	4	11	13	7	10	8	Ret			10	11	210
12	(United Kingdom) Ollie Millroy	4	4	5	6	4	5	11	8													152
13	(Bolivia) Pedro Pablo Calbimonte	12	13	Ret	10	7	11	13	11	Ret	3	12	12	Ret	Ret							123
14	(United Kingdom) Will Stevens	2	5									Ret	2									76
15	(United Kingdom) Alex Walker (G)															6	9	10	Ret			41
16	(Australia) Geoff Uhrhane																	13	13			19
Guest drivers ineligible for points
	(Puerto Rico) Félix Serrallés	10	10					12	5			6	9	2	3			12	5	Ret	12	0
	(United Arab Emirates) Ed Jones											9	10					Ret	7	12	Ret	0
Pos	Driver	BHI		DON		THR		OUL		CRO		SNE		SIL		ROC		BHGP		SIL		Pts

Colour	Result
Gold	Winner
Silver	Second place
Bronze	Third place
Green	Points classification
Blue	Non-points classification
Blue	Non-classified finish (NC)
Purple	Retired, not classified (Ret)
Red	Did not qualify (DNQ)
Red	Did not pre-qualify (DNPQ)
Black	Disqualified (DSQ)
White	Did not start (DNS)
White	Withdrew (WD)
White	Race cancelled (C)
Blank	Did not practice (DNP)
Blank	Did not arrive (DNA)
Blank	Excluded (EX)

=== Entrants' Championship ===
Pos	Entrant	BHI		DON		THR		OUL		CRO		SNE		SIL		ROC		BHGP		SIL		Pts
1	Fortec Motorsports	1	1	1	2	1	1	1	1	3	1	3	1	1	1	1	1	1	1	1	1	1119
1	Fortec Motorsports	2	6	3	3	3	3	4	2	5	3	4	2	5	2	2	2	2	9	2	2	1119
2	Atech Reid GP	3	2	2	1	2	2	3	4	1	4	1	3	4	5	3	3	3	2	4	4	842
2	Atech Reid GP	11	8	11	9	8	8	5	Ret	2	6	2	11	7	7	4	4	11	4	9	7	842
3	Manor Competition	4	4	5	5	4	5	8	6	4	2	7	4	6	8	7	7	4	6	7	5	691
3	Manor Competition	7	7	6	6	10	4	9	7	9	Ret	8	5	8	9	9	8	8	8	8	8	691
4	Mark Burdett Motorsport	6	3	4	4	6	7	2	9	8	5	5	6	3	6	5	5	5	3	3	3	502
4	Mark Burdett Motorsport							7	Ret									6	11	5	6	502
5	Fortec Competition	2	5					12	5			6	9	2	3			12	5	12	12	48
5	Fortec Competition	10	10															Ret	7	Ret	Ret	48
6	Antel Motorsport	13	11	10	Ret																	30
Pos	Entrant	BHI		DON		THR		OUL		CRO		SNE		SIL		ROC		BHGP		SIL		Pts

== Formula Renault UK Finals Series ==
The 2011 Protyre Formula Renault UK Finals Series will be the 14th British Formula Renault Winter Series and the first season under the new name of the Formula Renault UK Finals Series. The series will commence at Snetterton on 5–6 November and end at Rockingham on 12 November, after six races at three rounds held in England.

=== Teams and drivers ===
2011 Finals Series Entry List
Team	No.	Driver name	Class
(Finland) Koiranen Motorsport	2	(Russia) Daniil Kvyat	
(Finland) Koiranen Motorsport	4	(Estonia) Hans Villemi	
(Finland) Koiranen Motorsport	5	(Sweden) John Bryant-Meisner	
(Finland) Koiranen Motorsport	6	(Estonia) Martin Rump	
(Finland) Koiranen Motorsport	7	(Germany) Stefan Wackerbauer	
(United Kingdom) Atech Reid GP	8	(Australia) Geoff Uhrhane	
(United Kingdom) Atech Reid GP	16	(United Kingdom) Dan Wells	
(Austria) Interwetten Racing	9	(United Kingdom) Melville McKee	
(United Kingdom) RPD Motorsports	10	(United Kingdom) Steve Durrant	B
(Netherlands) Van Amersfoort Racing	11	(Netherlands) Dennis van de Laar	
(Netherlands) Van Amersfoort Racing	12	(Brazil) Joao Sergio Camara	
(United Kingdom) Fortec Competition	14	(United Arab Emirates) Ed Jones	
(United Kingdom) Fortec Competition	24	(Puerto Rico) Félix Serrallés	
(United Kingdom) Fortec Competition	34	(Austria) Thomas Jäger	
(United Kingdom) Fortec Competition	44	(United Kingdom) Oliver Rowland	
(United Kingdom) Manor Competition	17	(Australia) Nick McBride	
(United Kingdom) Manor Competition	18	(United Kingdom) Hector Hurst	
(United Kingdom) Manor Competition	42	(United Kingdom) Jordan King	
(United Kingdom) Fortec Motorsports	19	(United Kingdom) Dan De Zille	
(United Kingdom) Fortec Motorsports	26	(United Kingdom) Archie Hamilton	B
(United Kingdom) Fortec Motorsports	29	(United Kingdom) Josh Hill	
(United Kingdom) Fortec Motorsports	39	(India) Shahaan Engineer	
(United Kingdom) Fortec Motorsports	41	(United Kingdom) Jake Dennis	
(United Kingdom) Mark Burdett Motorsport	21	(United Kingdom) Josh Webster	
(United Kingdom) Mark Burdett Motorsport	22	(Poland) Tomasz Krzeminski	
(United Kingdom) Hillspeed	25	(Spain) Víctor Jiménez	B
(United Kingdom) Hillspeed	31	(United Kingdom) Joe Kibbler	B
(United Kingdom) Hillspeed	33	(United Kingdom) Sean Walkinshaw	B
(United Kingdom) Antel Motorsport	28	(India) Chirag Marhotra	B
(United Kingdom) Antel Motorsport	55	(Russia) Ivan Taranov	B
(United Kingdom) MGR Motorsport	66	(United Kingdom) James Fletcher	B

Icon	Class
B	BARC Class
I	Invitation Class

=== Calendar ===
Round		Circuit	Date	Pole position	Fastest lap	Winning driver	Winning team
1	R1	Snetterton, Norfolk	5 November	(United Kingdom) Josh Hill	(United Kingdom) Oliver Rowland	(United Kingdom) Oliver Rowland	(United Kingdom) Fortec Competition
1	R2	Snetterton, Norfolk	5 November	(United Kingdom) Josh Hill	(Russia) Daniil Kvyat	(United Kingdom) Oliver Rowland	(United Kingdom) Fortec Competition
2	R3	Snetterton, Norfolk	6 November	(United Kingdom) Josh Hill	(United Kingdom) Oliver Rowland	(United Kingdom) Josh Hill	(United Kingdom) Fortec Motorsports
2	R4	Snetterton, Norfolk	6 November	(United Kingdom) Josh Hill	(United Kingdom) Josh Hill	(United Kingdom) Oliver Rowland	(United Kingdom) Fortec Competition
3	R5	Rockingham, Northamptonshire	12 November	(United Kingdom) Josh Hill	(United Kingdom) Oliver Rowland	(United Kingdom) Oliver Rowland	(United Kingdom) Fortec Competition
3	R6	Rockingham, Northamptonshire	12 November	(United Kingdom) Josh Hill	(United Kingdom) Josh Hill	(United Kingdom) Josh Hill	(United Kingdom) Fortec Motorsports

=== Championship standings ===
Pos	Driver	SNE		SNE		ROC		Points
UK Finals Cup
1	(United Kingdom) Oliver Rowland	1	1	2	1	1	2	190
2	(United Kingdom) Dan Wells	4	2	6	3	3	6	136
3	(Russia) Daniil Kvyat	2	4	5	Ret	2	10	111
4	(United Kingdom) Josh Webster	7	5	4	2	9	5	108
5	(United Kingdom) Josh Hill	9	Ret	1	14	Ret	1	87
6	(Austria) Thomas Jäger	5	Ret	13	6	13	3	79
7	(United Kingdom) Nick McBride	10	9	9	13	8	4	79
8	(Puerto Rico) Félix Serrallés	3	3	Ret	Ret	25	7	68
9	(Sweden) John Bryant-Meisner	Ret	12	14	4	7	8	68
10	(Estonia) Hans Villemi	18	11	11	5	11	11	63
11	(United Kingdom) Hector Hurst	14	10	22	8	10	9	60
12	(United Kingdom) Jordan King	11	7	3	Ret			51
13	(Australia) Geoff Uhrhane	6	Ret	7	Ret	12	Ret	43
14	(United Kingdom) Dan De Zille	12	17	Ret	9	6	Ret	43
15	(United Arab Emirates) Ed Jones	15	18	10	Ret	4	Ret	42
16	(Netherlands) Dennis van de Laar	21	13	15	7	17	15	42
17	(United Kingdom) Melville McKee	16	16	8	10	15	Ret	41
18	(India) Shahaan Engineer	13	14	12	12	14	Ret	40
19	(United Kingdom) Jake Dennis	17	8	Ret	Ret	5	Ret	38
20	(Germany) Stefan Wackerbauer	8	6	Ret	18	Ret	Ret	37
21	(Poland) Tomasz Krzeminski	20	15	Ret	11	16	Ret	22
22	(Brazil) Joao Sergio Camara	19	19	Ret	15	18	12	22
BARC Finals Cup
1	(Spain) Víctor Jiménez	23	21	18	19	20	17	156
2	(United Kingdom) Archie Hamilton	22	20	17	16	21	Ret	153
3	(United Kingdom) James Fletcher	Ret	Ret	16	17	19	13	132
4	(United Kingdom) Sean Walkinshaw	25	23	19	20	24	16	131
5	(India) Chirag Malhotra	26	24	20	21	Ret	18	109
6	(United Kingdom) Joe Kibbler	27	25	21	22	26	19	106
7	(Russia) Ivan Taranov	24	22	Ret	Ret	23	14	98
8	(United Kingdom) Steve Durrant					22	Ret	22
Pos	Driver	SNE		SNE		ROC		Pts

Colour	Result
Gold	Winner
Silver	Second place
Bronze	Third place
Green	Points classification
Blue	Non-points classification
Blue	Non-classified finish (NC)
Purple	Retired, not classified (Ret)
Red	Did not qualify (DNQ)
Red	Did not pre-qualify (DNPQ)
Black	Disqualified (DSQ)
White	Did not start (DNS)
White	Withdrew (WD)
White	Race cancelled (C)
Blank	Did not practice (DNP)
Blank	Did not arrive (DNA)
Blank	Excluded (EX)
