= Sean Walkinshaw =

British racing driver (born 1993)

- Nationality: (United Kingdom) British
- Born: Sean Nathan Thomas Walkinshaw; 3 November 1993 (age 33) Brussels, Belgium

Super Taikyu Series career
- Debut season: 2023
- Current team: Hitotsuyama Racing
- Categorisation: FIA Silver
- Car number: 21

Previous series
- 2022 2017-2021: Intercontinental GT Challenge; Super GT

Sean Nathan Thomas Walkinshaw (born 3 November 1993) is a British racing driver who competes in the Super Taikyu Series for Hitotsuyama Racing. He is the son of former Formula 1 team principal Tom Walkinshaw.

== Career ==
=== Super GT ===
Walkinshaw made his debut in Super GT in 2017 with Autobacs Racing Team Aguri alongside Shinichi Takagi. They clinched fourth in the standings with a win. They continued to race in the next season, finishing runners up with two wins, losing out to LEON Racing of Naoya Gamou, and Haruki Kurosawa. With ARTA changing their car to Honda NSX GT3, Walkinshaw got replaced by Honda Junior Nirei Fukuzumi.

In 2019, Walkinshaw moved to Team Thailand to race alongside Nattapong Horthongkum. Walkinshaw returned to the team, for the last three rounds of the 2020 season alongside Mathias Beche. Walkinshaw raced for the last time in Super GT for 2021 where he raced with Giuliano Alesi. During his time on Team Thailand, he did not score a single point.

=== Super Taikyu ===
In 2023, Walkinshaw returned to Japan, competing in Super Taikyu with Hitotsuyama Racing.

== Racing record ==
=== Racing career summary ===
| Season | Series | Team | Races | Wins | Poles | F/Laps | Podiums | Points | Position |
|---|---|---|---|---|---|---|---|---|---|
| 2011 | Formula Renault BARC Finals Cup | Hillspeed | 6 | 0 | 0 | 0 | 1 | 131 | 4th |
| 2011 | Formula Renault BARC | Hillspeed | 12 | 0 | 0 | 0 | 0 | 39 | 22nd |
| 2011 | Formula Renault 2.0 Northern European Cup | Hillspeed | 2 | 0 | 0 | 0 | 0 | 3 | 51st |
| 2012 | JK Racing Asia Series | US Formula Project | 2 | 0 | 0 | 0 | 0 | 0 | NC† |
| 2012 | Formula Renault BARC | MTECH Lite | 14 | 0 | 0 | 0 | 0 | 71 | 18th |
| 2012-13 | MRF Challenge Formula 2000 Championship | MRF Racing | 2 | 0 | 0 | 0 | 0 | 0 | 25th |
| 2013 | European F3 Open Championship | Team West-Tec F3 | 16 | 0 | 0 | 0 | 0 | 0 | 33rd |
| 2013 | European F3 Open Championship - Copa | Team West-Tec F3 | 16 | 0 | 0 | 0 | 2 | 19 | 9th |
| 2013 | British Formula 3 International Series - National Class | Team West-Tec | 3 | 0 | 0 | 0 | 0 | 20 | 9th |
| 2013 | Formula Renault 2.0 Northern European Cup | SL Formula | 2 | 0 | 0 | 0 | 0 | 5 | 45th |
| 2013-14 | MRF Challenge Formula 2000 Championship | MRF Racing | | | | | | | |
| 2014 | Euroformula Open Championship | Campos Racing | 16 | 0 | 0 | 0 | 0 | 53 | 10th |
| 2015 | GT Sprint Series | MRS GT-Racing | 8 | 0 | 0 | 1 | 1 | 31 | 14th |
| 2015 | GT Sprint Series | Always Evolving Motorsport | 6 | 0 | 0 | 2 | 0 | 31 | 14th |
| 2015 | Blancpain Endurance Series - Pro Cup | MRS GT-Racing | 5 | 0 | 0 | 0 | 0 | 18 | 15th |
| 2015-16 | MRF Challenge Formula 2000 Championship | MRF Racing | 10 | 0 | 0 | 0 | 0 | 35 | 12th |
| 2016 | GT Series Sprint Cup | Nissan GT Academy Team RJN | 10 | 0 | 0 | 0 | 0 | 0 | NC |
| 2016 | Blancpain GT Series Endurance Cup | Nissan GT Academy Team RJN | 5 | 0 | 0 | 0 | 0 | 0 | NC |
| 2016 | Italian GT Championship - SuperGT3 | Drive Technology Italia Srl | | | | | | | |
| 2017 | Super GT - GT300 | Autobacs Racing Team Aguri | 8 | 1 | 1 | 0 | 3 | 61 | 4th |
| 2017 | Blancpain GT Series Asia - GT3 | FIST - Team AAI | 2 | 0 | 0 | 0 | 0 | 0 | NC |
| 2018 | Super GT - GT300 | Autobacs Racing Team Aguri | 8 | 2 | 1 | 0 | 2 | 62 | **2nd** |
| 2018 | TCR UK Touring Car Championship | Sean Walkinshaw Racing | 4 | 0 | 0 | 0 | 1 | 76 | 14th |
| 2018 | Blancpain GT Series Endurance Cup | GT SPORT MOTUL Team RJN | 1 | 0 | 0 | 0 | 0 | 0 | NC |
| 2019 | Super GT - GT300 | arto Ping An Team Thailand | 8 | 0 | 0 | 0 | 0 | 0 | NC |
| 2019 | Blancpain GT Series Endurance Cup | Belgian Audi Club Team WRT | 1 | 0 | 0 | 0 | 0 | 0 | NC |
| 2020 | Super GT - GT300 | arto Ping An Team Thailand | 3 | 0 | 0 | 0 | 0 | 0 | NC |
| 2021 | Super GT - GT300 | arto Team Thailand | 8 | 0 | 0 | 0 | 0 | 0 | NC |
| 2022 | GT World Challenge Europe Endurance Cup | Madpanda Motorsport | 5 | 0 | 0 | 0 | 0 | 0 | NC |
| 2023 | Super Taikyu – ST-X | Hitotsuyama Racing | | | | | | ‡ | ‡ |
| 2024 | Super Taikyu – ST-X | Hitotsuyama Racing | | | | | | ‡ | ‡ |
| 2025 | Super Taikyu – ST-X | Hitotsuyama Racing | | | | | | *‡ | *‡ |
| 2026 | Super Taikyu - ST-3 | Hitotsuyama Racing | | | | | | | |
| 2026 | Super Taikyu - ST-X | R Zero Racing | | | | | | | |

=== Complete Formula Renault 2.0 NEC results ===
(key) (Races in bold indicate pole position) (Races in italics indicate fastest lap)

| Year | Entrant | 1 | 2 | 3 | 4 | 5 | 6 | 7 | 8 | 9 | 10 | 11 | 12 | 13 | 14 | 15 | 16 | 17 | 18 | 19 | 20 | DC | Points |
|---|---|---|---|---|---|---|---|---|---|---|---|---|---|---|---|---|---|---|---|---|---|---|---|
| 2011 | Hillspeed | HOC; 1 | HOC; 2 | HOC; 3 | SPA; 1 | SPA; 2 | NÜR; 1 | NÜR; 2 | ASS; 1 | ASS; 2 | ASS; 3 | OSC; 1 | OSC; 2 | ZAN; 1; 22 | ZAN; 2; 18 | MST; 1 | MST; 2 | MST; 3 | MNZ; 1 | MNZ; 2 | MNZ; 3 | 51st | 3 |
| 2013 | SL Formula | HOC; 1 | HOC; 2 | HOC; 3 | NÜR; 1 | NÜR; 2 | SIL; 1 | SIL; 2 | SPA; 1; 19 | SPA; 2; 18 | ASS; 1 | ASS; 2 | MST; 1 | MST; 2 | MST; 3 | ZAN; 1 | ZAN; 2 | ZAN; 3 | | | | 45th | 5 |

=== Complete Super GT results ===
(key) (Races in bold indicate pole position) (Races in italics indicate fastest lap)

| Year | Team | Class | 1 | 2 | 3 | 4 | 5 | 6 | 7 | 8 | DC | Pts | |
|---|---|---|---|---|---|---|---|---|---|---|---|---|---|
| 2017 | Autobacs Racing Team Aguri | BMW M6 GT3 | GT300 | OKA; 5 | FUJ; 17 | AUT; 3 | SUG; Ret | **FUJ**; 1 | SUZ; Ret | CHA; 4 | MOT; 2 | 4th | 61 |
| 2018 | Autobacs Racing Team Aguri | BMW M6 GT3 | GT300 | OKA; 6 | **FUJ**; 1 | SUZ; 20 | CHA; 11 | FUJ; 1 | SUG; 10 | AUT; 4 | MOT; 9 | **2nd** | **62** |
| 2019 | arto Ping An Team Thailand | Lexus RC F GT3 | GT300 | OKA; 18 | FUJ; 24 | SUZ; 16 | CHA; 17 | FUJ; 20 | AUT; 20 | SUG; 21 | MOT; 22 | NC | 0 |
| 2020 | arto Ping An Team Thailand | Lexus RC F GT3 | GT300 | FUJ | FUJ | SUZ | MOT | FUJ | SUZ; 19 | MOT; 23 | FUJ; 26 | NC | 0 |
| 2021 | arto Team Thailand | Lexus RC F GT3 | GT300 | OKA; 24 | FUJ; 22 | MOT; Ret | SUZ; 20 | SUG; 17 | AUT; Ret | MOT; 17 | FUJ; 20 | NC | 0 |
