= 2012–13 MRF Challenge Formula 2000 Championship =

Auto racing championship in India

2012–13 MRF Challenge

Seasons
- ← none 2013–14 →

The 2012-2013 MRF Challenge Formula 2000 Championship was the inaugural running of the MRF Challenge Formula 2000 Championship. The series consisted of 10 races, spread across 3 meetings began on 26 October 2012 at the Buddh International Circuit, supporting the 2012 Indian Grand Prix and ended on 10 February 2013.

== Drivers ==
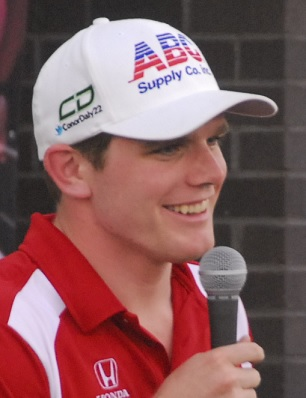
Conor Daly became the 2012-13 MRF Formula 2000 champion.

No.	Driver	Rounds
2	(India) Parth Ghorpade	2-3
3	(India) Parthiva Sureshwaren	All
4	(United Kingdom) Luciano Bacheta	All
5	(Australia) Dylan Young	1-2
6	(Lebanon) Noel Jammal	1-2
6	(Germany) Sebastian Balthasar	3
7	(United Kingdom) Alice Powell	All
8	(Japan) Yudai Jinkawa	All
9	(Japan) Shinya Michimi	3
11	(Italy) Vicky Piria	3
13	(India) Gaurav Gill	2
14	(United Kingdom) Matthew Mason	1
14	(United Kingdom) Rupert Svendsen-Cook	3
16	(Brazil) Henrique Baptista	1-2
18	(Spain) Carmen Jordá	3
19	(India) Ashwin Sundar	1
20	(Spain) Carmen Boix	1-2
22	(United States) Conor Daly	All
23	(United Kingdom) Jon Lancaster	All
24	(United Kingdom) Tom Gladdis	1-2
29	(Belgium) Sam Dejonghe	2-3
33	(United Kingdom) Sean Walkinshaw	1
35	(United Kingdom) Hector Hurst	1-2
42	(United Kingdom) Jordan King	All
55	(United Kingdom) Josh Hill	3
117	(Brazil) Gustavo Myasava	All

== Race calendar and results ==
All rounds were held in India.

Round		Circuit	Date	Pole position	Fastest lap	Winning driver
2012
1	R1	Buddh International Circuit, Noida	27 October	(United Kingdom) Jordan King	(United States) Conor Daly	(United States) Conor Daly
1	R2	Buddh International Circuit, Noida	28 October		(United Kingdom) Jordan King	(United Kingdom) Jordan King
2	R1	Buddh International Circuit, Noida	29 November	(United Kingdom) Jordan King	(United Kingdom) Jordan King	(United Kingdom) Jordan King
2	R2	Buddh International Circuit, Noida	30 November		(United Kingdom) Jordan King	(United Kingdom) Jordan King
2	R3	Buddh International Circuit, Noida	1 December		(United Kingdom) Alice Powell	(United States) Conor Daly
2	R4	Buddh International Circuit, Noida	2 December		(Belgium) Sam Dejonghe	(Japan) Yudai Jinkawa
2013
3	R1	Madras Motor Racing Track, Chennai	9 February	(United Kingdom) Jon Lancaster	(United Kingdom) Josh Hill	(United Kingdom) Josh Hill
3	R2	Madras Motor Racing Track, Chennai	9 February		(United States) Conor Daly	(United States) Conor Daly
3	R3	Madras Motor Racing Track, Chennai	10 February		(United Kingdom) Jordan King	(United Kingdom) Jordan King
3	R4	Madras Motor Racing Track, Chennai	10 February		(Japan) Yudai Jinkawa	(United States) Conor Daly

== Championship standings ==
Scoring system

Position	1st	2nd	3rd	4th	5th	6th	7th	8th	9th	10th
Points	25	18	15	12	10	8	6	4	2	1

Pos	Driver	BIC		BIC				MMRT				Points
1	(United States) Conor Daly	1	3	2	4	1	15	6	1	5	1	164
2	(United Kingdom) Jordan King	**2**	1	**1**	1			4	3	1	7	159
3	(United Kingdom) Luciano Bacheta	3	2	3	2	Ret	17	3	4	Ret	6	102
4	(United Kingdom) Jon Lancaster	5	Ret	4	Ret	Ret	8	**2**	5	2	2	91
5	(United Kingdom) Alice Powell	4	4	17	3	2	5	12	9	6	10	79
6	(Belgium) Sam Dejonghe			10	6	4	3	5	2	4	Ret	77
7	(United Kingdom) Josh Hill							1	6	3	3	64
8	(Japan) Yudai Jinkawa	13	7	5	Ret	5	1	15	10	Ret	9	55
9	(United Kingdom) Hector Hurst	9	6	6	5	3	4					55
10	(India) Parthiva Sureshwaren	7	10	9	11	7	6	8	12	7	Ret	33
11	(Lebanon) Noel Jammal	5	8	15	Ret	8	2					27
12	(Japan) Shinya Michimi							7	7	11	4	24
13	(United Kingdom) Tom Gladdis	6	9	7	Ret	Ret	9					18
14	(Italy) Vicky Piria							11	15	8	5	14
15	(Brazil) Gustavo Myasava	14	Ret	13	7	10	13	9	Ret	10	Ret	10
16	(India) Parth Ghorpade			8	13	12	7	Ret	11	Ret	DNS	10
17	(India) Gaurav Gill			Ret	9	6	16					10
18	(United Kingdom) Matthew Mason	11	5									10
19	(Germany) Sebastian Balthasar							10	8	Ret	8	9
20	(India) Ashwin Sundar	8	Ret									4
21	(Brazil) Henrique Baptista	Ret	13	12	8	Ret	12					4
22	(Australia) Dylan Young	15	12	11	10	9	11					3
23	(Spain) Carmen Jordá							13	14	9	Ret	2
24	(Spain) Carmen Boix	16	14	14	12	11	10					1
25	(United Kingdom) Sean Walkinshaw	12	11									0
26	(United Kingdom) Rupert Svendsen-Cook							15	13	Ret	Ret	0
Pos	Driver	BIC		BIC				MMRT				Points

Colour	Result
Gold	Winner
Silver	Second place
Bronze	Third place
Green	Points classification
Blue	Non-points classification
Blue	Non-classified finish (NC)
Purple	Retired, not classified (Ret)
Red	Did not qualify (DNQ)
Red	Did not pre-qualify (DNPQ)
Black	Disqualified (DSQ)
White	Did not start (DNS)
White	Withdrew (WD)
White	Race cancelled (C)
Blank	Did not practice (DNP)
Blank	Did not arrive (DNA)
Blank	Excluded (EX)

**Bold** – Pole for Race One
Italics – Fastest Lap
