= Jordan King =

British racing driver (born 1994)

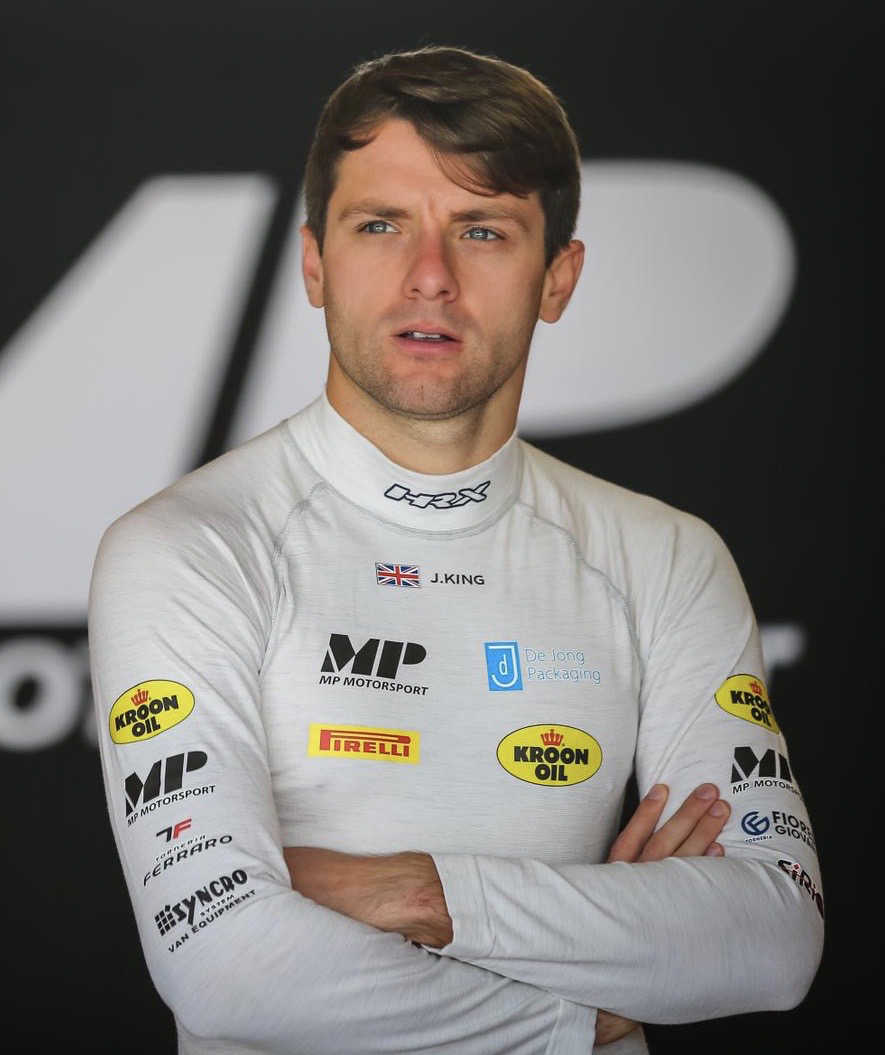
- King in 2019
- Nationality: (United Kingdom) British
- Born: 26 February 1994 (age 32) Warwick, Warwickshire, England
- Relatives: Justin King (father)

Formula E career
- Debut season: 2023–24
- Current team: Mahindra Formula E Team
- Categorisation: FIA Gold
- Car number: 21
- Starts: 2
- Wins: 0
- Podiums: 0
- Poles: 0
- Fastest laps: 0
- Best finish: 26th in 2023–24
- Finished last season: 26th (0 pts)

Previous series
- 2019–20 2018-2019 2017, 2019 2015-16 2013-14 2013 2012 2012 2011–12 2011 2011: FIA World Endurance Championship; IndyCar Series; FIA Formula 2 Championship; GP2 Series; European Formula 3 Championship; British Formula 3 Eurocup Formula Renault 2.0; Toyota Racing Series; Formula Renault 2.0 NEC; Formula Renault UK; FIA Formula Two Championship

Championship titles
- 2015 2013 2011: FIA Institute Young Driver of the Year; British Formula 3 MRF Formula 1600

Jordan King (born 26 February 1994 in Warwick) is a British racing driver. He is currently the reserve driver for the Mahindra Formula E Team, for whom he made his Formula E debut at the 2024 Berlin ePrix.

Previously, King has been a race winner in the GP2 Series and the LMP2 class of the WEC, as well as racing in the IndyCar Series. He is also the 2013 champion of the British F3 International Series.

== Personal life ==
King attended Repton School in Derbyshire on a C. B. Fry scholarship and later Princethorpe College in Warwickshire. King is the son of former Sainsbury's CEO Justin King.

King is also an avid fundraiser for Birmingham Children's Hospital, having raised over £8,500 in 2019 while cycling the North Coast 500. In 2020, he ran the 84-mile Hadrian's Wall Path to continue his fundraising efforts.

In 2024, King ran the London Marathon raising over £16,900 for Birmingham Children’s Hospital and completing the marathon in 2:58.

King also manages the career of 2024 Euro 4 Champion Akshay Bohra.

== Career ==
=== Formula Renault 2.0 UK ===
King's early racing career began in karting before he moved to open-wheel racing at the end of 2010. He began driving in Formula Renault UK, starting in the Formula Renault UK Winter Series before he began the main championship in 2011.

=== FIA Formula Two Championship ===
In 2009, aged only fifteen, King tested a Formula Two car. He drove four races in Formula Palmer Audi at the Silverstone round in 2010, managing to get a podium and impressing series boss Jonathan Palmer. In 2011, he has signed up for three rounds of the Formula Two championship, at Spa-Francorchamps, the Nürburgring and Brands Hatch during the Formula Renault UK summer break. King was the youngest driver to take part in the modern era of the series.

=== GP2 Series ===
In February 2015, it was confirmed King would move up to GP2, signing with Racing Engineering, alongside Alexander Rossi, for 2015, where he finished twelfth overall. He remained with the team for the following season, where he claimed two victories and finished seventh overall.

=== FIA Formula 2 Championship ===
==== 2017 ====
In 2017, King switched to MP Motorsport for a third season of the sport.

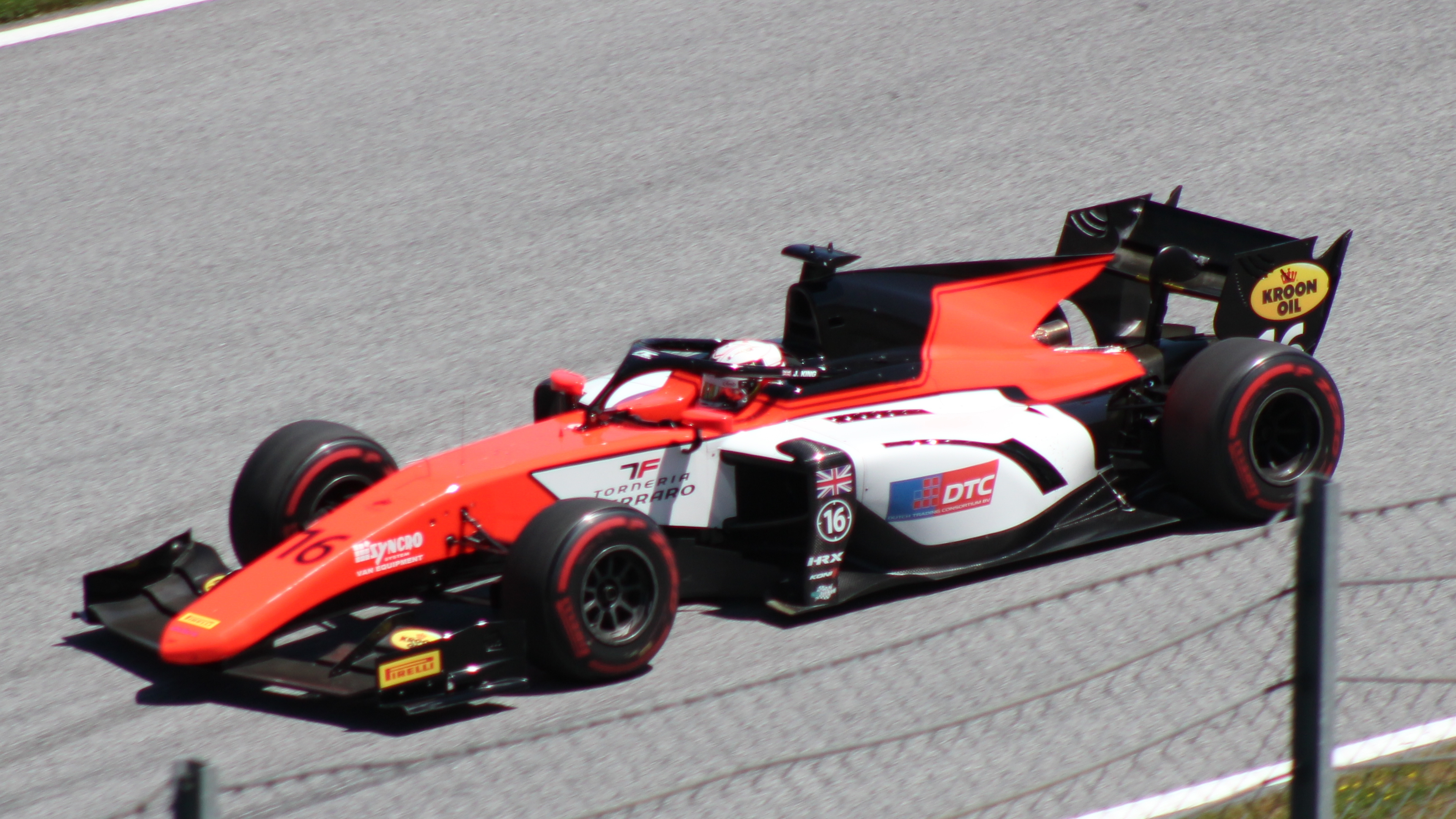
King at the 2019 Spielberg Formula 2 round with MP Motorsport

==== 2019 ====
For 2019, King returned with the same team partnered with Indian driver Mahaveer Raghunathan. King missed the Monaco round due to his participation in the 2019 Indianapolis 500, with Artem Markelov serving as his substitute. King scored two podium finishes during the season, claiming the third position in the feature race at Baku and second in the sprint race at Monza. He finished ninth in the standings.

King holds two F2 track records, both set in 2017, at Circuit de Spa-Francorchamps and Autodromo Nazionale di Monza.

== Formula One ==
King was signed as a development driver by the Manor Marussia team for the 2015 season, being retained by the squad, renamed Manor Racing, in 2016. He made his debut in a Formula One session when he drove for Manor during free practice at the 2016 United States Grand Prix.

Since 2020, King has been a development driver for the Alpine F1 Team.

== IndyCar Series ==
In 2018, King signed with Ed Carpenter Racing as a part-time driver in the No. 20 car, sharing driving duties with owner Ed Carpenter. Carpenter started the ovals, while King started the eleven road and street circuit races. In his IndyCar Series debut, the season opening Firestone Grand Prix of St. Petersburg, he set the track record in qualifying, made the Firestone Fast 6 and took the lead of the race on only the fifth lap. His second Fast 6 appearance came at the Indianapolis Motor Speedway during qualifications for the IndyCar Grand Prix. He also paced the field during the only international stop in 2018, the Honda Indy Toronto. King advanced out of the first round of qualifications in half of the possible races over the course of the season.

King returned to IndyCar racing in 2019 to make his Indianapolis 500 debut with Rahal Letterman Lanigan Racing. The 2019 Indianapolis 500 was his first-ever oval race. He successfully qualified his No. 42 on the first day, locking in the 26th starting position.

== FIA World Endurance Championship ==
King also made his debut in prototype racing in 2019. He signed with Jackie Chan DC Racing x Jota for the 1000 Miles of Sebring, the sixth round of the 2018-19 Super Season. King secured the LMP2 victory in his first endurance race and subsequently finished the season with the team. He competed in his first 24 Hours of Le Mans in June.

King has competed in two rounds of the 2019-20 Super Season with Team LNT Ginetta Cars in the LMP1 class.

== Formula E ==
King first tested Formula E machinery twice, firstly in 2016-17 with Mahindra Racing, and again in a private test with Dragon Racing in 2019. In February 2021, it was announced that King would be taking on a sim and development driver role at Mahindra. In April 2023, King would participate in the Berlin rookies' driver test with the team.

=== Mahindra Racing (2024) ===
King made his debut in Berlin with Mahindra, replacing Nyck de Vries, who missed the event due to a calendar clash with 6 Hours of Spa.

== Racing record ==
=== Career summary ===
Season	Series	Team	Races	Wins	Poles	F/Laps	Podiums	Points	Position
2010	Formula Palmer Audi	MotorSport Vision	4	0	1	0	1	20	23rd
2010	Formula Renault UK Winter Series	Manor Competition	6	0	0	0	0	43	15th
2011	Formula Renault UK	Manor Competition	20	0	1	1	1	265	8th
2011	MRF Formula 1600 India	Team Sidvin	8	4	1	6	6	?	**1st**
2011	FIA Formula Two Championship	MotorSport Vision	6	0	0	0	0	17	14th
2012	Formula Renault 2.0 NEC	Manor MP Motorsport	20	1	0	2	9	316	**2nd**
2012	Eurocup Formula Renault 2.0	Manor MP Motorsport	14	0	0	0	1	31	13th
2012	Toyota Racing Series	M2 Competition	14	1	1	1	4	591	5th
2012–13	MRF Challenge Formula 2000	MRF Racing	8	4	2	4	6	159	**2nd**
2013	FIA Formula 3 European Championship	Carlin	30	0	0	1	2	176	6th
2013	British Formula 3 Championship	Carlin	12	3	2	2	8	176	**1st**
2013	Masters of Formula 3	Carlin	1	0	0	0	0	N/A	5th
2014	FIA Formula 3 European Championship	Carlin	32	0	0	0	7	217	7th
2015	GP2 Series	Racing Engineering	22	0	0	1	1	60	12th
2015	Formula One	Manor Marussia F1 Team	Development Driver						
2016	GP2 Series	Racing Engineering	22	2	0	1	5	122	7th
2016	Formula One	Manor Racing MRT	Development Driver						
2017	FIA Formula 2 Championship	MP Motorsport	22	0	0	0	0	62	11th
2018	IndyCar Series	Ed Carpenter Racing	11	0	0	0	0	175	22nd
2018–19	FIA World Endurance Championship - LMP2	Jackie Chan DC Racing	3	1	0	0	1	40	11th
2019	FIA Formula 2 Championship	MP Motorsport	20	0	0	2	2	79	9th
2019	IndyCar Series	Rahal Letterman Lanigan Racing	1	0	0	0	0	12	36th
2019	24 Hours of Le Mans - LMP2	Jackie Chan DC Racing	1	0	0	0	0	N/A	DNF
2019–20	FIA World Endurance Championship	Team LNT	2	0	0	1	0	12	20th
2020–21	Formula E	Mahindra Racing	Reserve/development driver						
2021	Formula One	Alpine F1 Team	Simulator driver						
2021–22	Formula E	Mahindra Racing	Reserve/development driver						
2022–23	Formula E	Mahindra Racing	Reserve/development driver						
2023–24	Formula E	Mahindra Racing	2	0	0	0	0	0	26th
2024–25	Formula E	Mahindra Racing	Reserve/development driver						

=== Complete Formula Palmer Audi results ===
(key) (Races in bold indicate pole position) (Races in italics indicate fastest lap)

Year	1	2	3	4	5	6	7	8	9	10	11	12	13	14	15	16	17	18	19	20	Pos	Points
2010	BRH; 1	BRH; 2	BRH; 3	SNE; 1	SNE; 2	SNE; 3	SNE; 4	OUL; 1	OUL; 2	ROC; 1	ROC; 2	BRH; 1	BRH; 2	CRO; 1	CRO; 2	CRO; 3	**SIL**; **1** NC	SIL; 2 Ret	SIL; 3; 2	SIL; 4 Ret	23rd	20

=== Complete Formula Renault UK results ===
(key) (Races in bold indicate pole position) (Races in italics indicate fastest lap)

Year	Entrant	1	2	3	4	5	6	7	8	9	10	11	12	13	14	15	16	17	18	19	20	Pos	Points
2011	Manor Competition	BRI; 1; 8	BRI; 2; 9	DON; 1; 7	DON; 2; 8	THR; 1; 10	THR; 2; 10	OUL; 1 Ret	OUL; 2; 10	CRO; 1; 9	CRO; 2; 2	**SNE**; **1** Ret	SNE; 2; 8	SIL1; 1; 8	SIL1; 2; 9	ROC; 1; 9	ROC; 2; 7	BHGP; 1; 4	BHGP; 2; 12	SIL2; 1; 7	SIL2; 2; 8	8th	265

=== Complete Formula Renault 2.0 NEC results ===
(key) (Races in bold indicate pole position) (Races in italics indicate fastest lap)

Year	Entrant	1	2	3	4	5	6	7	8	9	10	11	12	13	14	15	16	17	18	19	20	DC	Points
2011	Manor MP Motorsport	HOC; 1	HOC; 2	HOC; 3	SPA; 1	SPA; 2	NÜR; 1	NÜR; 2	ASS; 1	ASS; 2	ASS; 3	OSC; 1; 8	OSC; 2; 6	ZAN; 1; 7	ZAN; 2; 5	MST; 1; 20	MST; 2; 3	MST; 3; 16	**MNZ**; **1**; 2	MNZ; 2; 3	MNZ; 3; 3	10th	148
2012	Manor MP Motorsport	HOC; 1; 2	HOC; 2; 5	HOC; 3; 5	NÜR; 1; 2	NÜR; 2; 5	OSC; 1; 2	OSC; 2; 2	OSC; 3 Ret	ASS; 1; 8	ASS; 2; 2	RBR; 1; 11	RBR; 2; 22	MST; 1; 2	MST; 2; 3	MST; 3; 3	ZAN; 1; 5	ZAN; 2; 15	ZAN; 3; 1	SPA; 1; 12	SPA; 2; 25	2nd	316

=== Complete FIA Formula Two Championship results ===
(key) (Races in bold indicate pole position) (Races in italics indicate fastest lap)

Year	1	2	3	4	5	6	7	8	9	10	11	12	13	14	15	16	Pos	Points
2011	SIL; 1	SIL; 2	MAG; 1	MAG; 2	SPA; 1; 17	SPA; 2; 8	NÜR; 1; 5	NÜR; 2; 9	BRH; 1 Ret	BRH; 2; 10	RBR; 1	RBR; 2	MNZ; 1	MNZ; 2	CAT; 1	CAT; 2	14th	17

=== Complete Eurocup Formula Renault 2.0 results ===
(key) (Races in bold indicate pole position) (Races in italics indicate fastest lap)

Year	Entrant	1	2	3	4	5	6	7	8	9	10	11	12	13	14	Pos	Points
2012	Manor MP Motorsport	ALC; 1 Ret	ALC; 2 Ret	SPA; 1; 7	SPA; 2; 12	NÜR; 1 Ret	NÜR; 2; 5	MSC; 1; 13	MSC; 2 Ret	HUN; 1; 3	HUN; 2; 13	LEC; 1; 20	LEC; 2 Ret	CAT; 1 Ret	CAT; 2; 25	13th	31

=== Complete British Formula Three Championship results ===
(key) (Races in bold indicate pole position) (Races in italics indicate fastest lap)

Year	Entrant	1	2	3	4	5	6	7	8	9	10	11	12	DC	Points
2013	Carlin	SIL; 1 Ret	SIL; 2; 6	SIL; 3; 2	SPA; 1; 2	SPA; 2; 1	SPA; 3; 3	BRH; 1; 2	BRH; 2; 4	BRH; 3; 2	**NÜR**; **1**; 1	NÜR; 2; 5	**NÜR**; **3**; 1	1st	176

=== Complete FIA Formula 3 European Championship results ===
(key)

Year	Entrant	Engine	1	2	3	4	5	6	7	8	9	10	11	12	13	14	15	16	17	18	19	20	21	22	23	24	25	26	27	28	29	30	31	32	33	DC	Points
2013	Carlin	Volkswagen	MNZ; 1; 7	MNZ; 2 Ret	MNZ; 3; 9	SIL; 1; 11	SIL; 2 Ret	SIL; 3; 6	HOC; 1; 11	HOC; 2; 9	HOC; 3; 5	BRH; 1; 7	BRH; 2; 13	BRH; 3; 11	RBR; 1; 3	RBR; 2; 6	RBR; 3; 5	NOR; 1; 17	NOR; 2; 9	NOR; 3; 9	NÜR; 1; 4	NÜR; 2; 4	NÜR; 3 Ret	ZAN; 1; 4	ZAN; 2; 4	ZAN; 3; 2	VAL; 1; 13	VAL; 2 Ret	VAL; 3; 5	HOC; 1; 6	HOC; 2; 8	HOC; 3; 9				6th	176
2014	Carlin	Volkswagen	SIL; 1; 3	SIL; 2; 6	SIL; 3; 9	HOC; 1; 3	HOC; 2; 9	HOC; 3; 7	PAU; 1; 5	PAU; 2; 18†	PAU; 3; 9	HUN; 1; 5	HUN; 2 Ret	HUN; 3 DNS	SPA; 1; 10	SPA; 2; 10	SPA; 3; 10	NOR; 1 Ret	NOR; 2; 2	NOR; 3; 3	MSC; 1; 2	MSC; 2; 5	MSC; 3 Ret	RBR; 1; 9	RBR; 2 Ret	RBR; 3; 7	NÜR; 1; 4	NÜR; 2; 6	NÜR; 3; 5	IMO; 1; 2	IMO; 2; 19	IMO; 3; 11	HOC; 1; 6	HOC; 2; 13	HOC; 3; 2	7th	217

=== Complete GP2/Formula 2 results ===
(key) (Races in bold indicate pole position) (Races in italics indicate fastest lap)

Year	Entrant	1	2	3	4	5	6	7	8	9	10	11	12	13	14	15	16	17	18	19	20	21	22	23	24	DC	Points
2015	Racing Engineering	BHR; FEA; 4	BHR; SPR; 9	CAT; FEA; 14	CAT; SPR; 11	MON; FEA; 9	MON; SPR; Ret	RBR; FEA; 12	RBR; SPR; 7	SIL; FEA; 22†	SIL; SPR; 10	HUN; FEA; 6	HUN; SPR; 12	SPA; FEA; 8	SPA; SPR; 2	MNZ; FEA; 8	MNZ; SPR; Ret	SOC; FEA; Ret	SOC; SPR; 15	BHR; FEA; 9	BHR; SPR; 6	YMC; FEA; 6	YMC; SPR; C			12th	60
2016	Racing Engineering	CAT; FEA; 7	CAT; SPR; 3	MON; FEA; Ret	MON; SPR; 16	BAK; FEA; 12†	BAK; SPR; 4	RBR; FEA; 8	RBR; SPR; 1	SIL; FEA; 8	SIL; SPR; 1	HUN; FEA; 8	HUN; SPR; 2	HOC; FEA; 15	HOC; SPR; 11	SPA; FEA; 2	SPA; SPR; 12	MNZ; FEA; 7	MNZ; SPR; 4	SEP; FEA; 5	SEP; SPR; 14	YMC; FEA; 13	YMC; SPR; 10			7th	122
2017	MP Motorsport	BHR; FEA; 4	BHR; SPR; 5	CAT; FEA; 9	CAT; SPR; 5	MON; FEA; 9	MON; SPR; 8	BAK; FEA; 6	BAK; SPR; DSQ	RBR; FEA; 9	RBR; SPR; 6	SIL; FEA; 7	SIL; SPR; Ret	HUN; FEA; 15	HUN; SPR; 11	SPA; FEA; Ret	SPA; SPR; 14	MNZ; FEA; 10	MNZ; SPR; 20	JER; FEA; 6	JER; SPR; Ret	YMC; FEA; 8	YMC; SPR; Ret			11th	62
2019	MP Motorsport	BHR; FEA; 17	BHR; SPR; 8	BAK; FEA; 3	BAK; SPR; Ret	CAT; FEA; 7	CAT; SPR; 7	MON; FEA	MON; SPR	LEC; FEA; 6	LEC; SPR; 11	RBR; FEA; 8	RBR; SPR; 7	SIL; FEA; 10	SIL; SPR; 9	HUN; FEA; 6	HUN; SPR; 4	SPA; FEA; C	SPA; SPR; C	MNZ; FEA; 6	MNZ; SPR; 2	SOC; FEA; 12	SOC; SPR; 9	YMC; FEA; 12	YMC; SPR; 9	9th	79

^{†} Driver did not finish the race, but was classified as he completed over 90% of the race distance.

=== Complete Formula One participations ===
(key) (Races in bold indicate pole position) (Races in italics indicates fastest lap)

Year	Entrant	Chassis	Engine	1	2	3	4	5	6	7	8	9	10	11	12	13	14	15	16	17	18	19	20	21	WDC	Points
2016	Manor Racing MRT	Manor MRT05	Mercedes PU106C Hybrid 1.6 V6 t	AUS	BHR	CHN	RUS	ESP	MON	CAN	EUR	AUT	GBR	HUN	GER	BEL	ITA	SIN	MAL	JPN	USA; TD	MEX	BRA	ABU; TD	–	–

=== American open-wheel racing results ===
(key) (Races in bold indicate pole position) (Races in italics indicate fastest lap)

==== IndyCar Series ====
Year	Team	No.	Chassis	Engine	1	2	3	4	5	6	7	8	9	10	11	12	13	14	15	16	17	Rank	Points	Ref
2018	Ed Carpenter Racing	20	Dallara DW12	Chevrolet	STP; 21	PHX	LBH; 18	ALA; 14	IMS; 24	INDY	DET; 16	DET; 18	TXS	ROA; 12	IOW	TOR; 11	MDO; 12	POC	GTW	POR; 15	SNM; 13	22nd	175	
2019	Rahal Letterman Lanigan Racing	42	Dallara DW12	Honda	STP	COA	ALA	LBH	IMS	INDY; 24	DET	DET	TXS	RDA	IOW	MDO	POC	GTW	POR	LAG		36th	12	

==== Indianapolis 500 ====
Year	Chassis	Engine	Start	Finish	Team
2019	Dallara	Honda	26	24	Rahal Letterman Lanigan Racing

=== Complete FIA World Endurance Championship results ===
(key) (Races in bold indicate pole position; races in italics indicate fastest lap)

Year	Entrant	Class	Chassis	Engine	1	2	3	4	5	6	7	8	Rank	Points
2018–19	Jackie Chan DC Racing	LMP2	Oreca 07	Gibson GK428 4.2 L V8	SPA	LMS	SIL	FUJ	SHA	SEB; 1	SPA; 6	LMS; Ret	11th	40
2019–20	Team LNT	LMP1	Ginetta G60-LT-P1	AER P60C 2.4 L Turbo V6	SIL	FUJ	SHA; 4	BHR; Ret	COA	SPA	LMS	BHR	20th	12

=== 24 Hours of Le Mans results ===
Year	Team	Co-Drivers	Car	Class	Laps	Pos.	Class Pos.
2019	(China) Jackie Chan DC Racing	(United States) Ricky Taylor (Denmark) David Heinemeier Hansson	Oreca 07-Gibson	LMP2	199	DNF	DNF

=== Complete Formula E results ===
(key) (Races in bold indicate pole position; races in italics indicate fastest lap)

Year	Team	Chassis	Powertrain	1	2	3	4	5	6	7	8	9	10	11	12	13	14	15	16	Pos	Points
2023–24	Mahindra Racing	Formula E Gen3	Mahindra M9Electro	MEX	DRH	DRH	SAP	TOK	MIS	MIS	MCO	BER; 12	BER; 18	SIC	SIC	POR	POR	LDN	LDN	26th	0

Sporting positions
Preceded by Jack Harvey	British Formula Three Champion; 2013	Succeeded by Martin Cao
