= Hector Hurst =

British racing driver and businessman

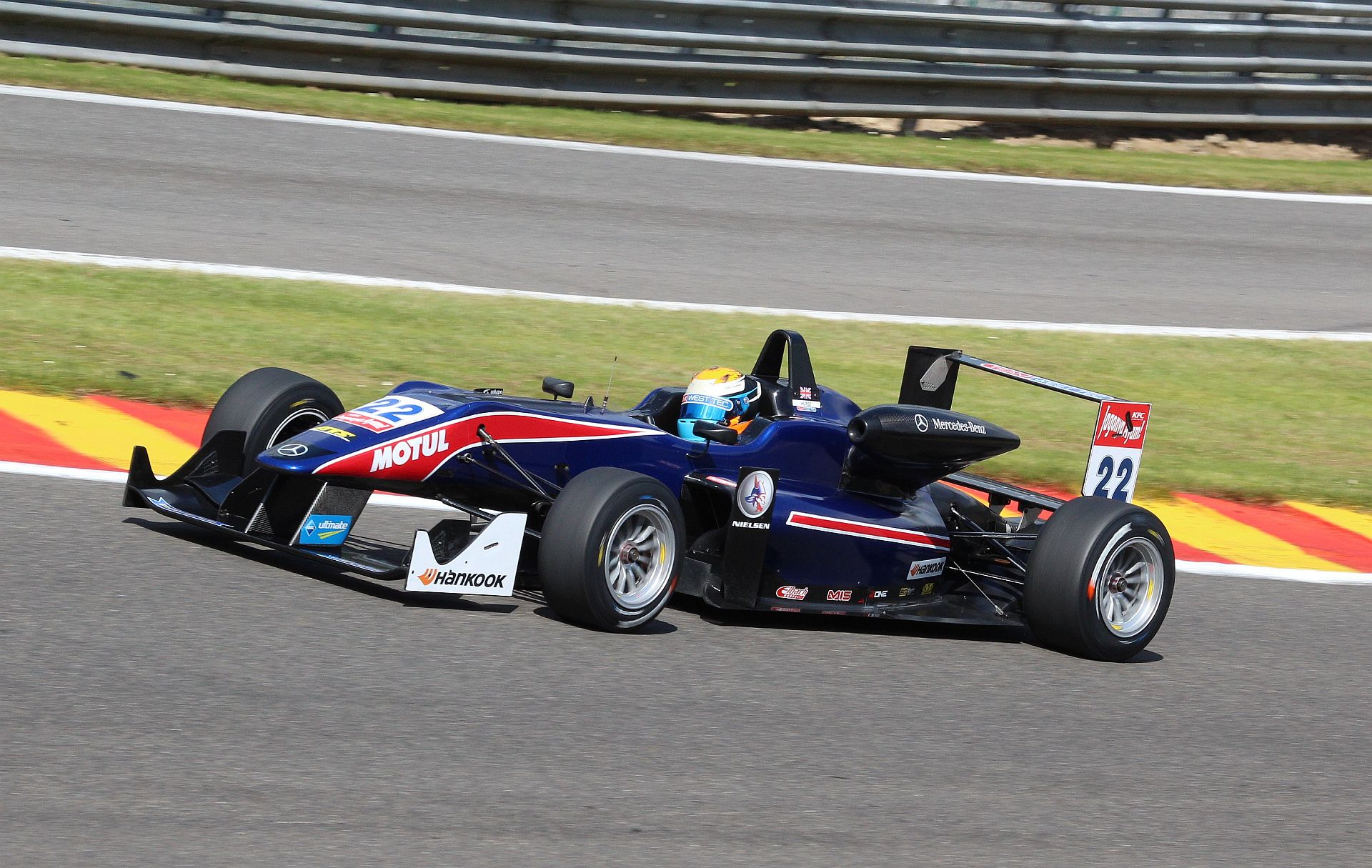
- Nationality: (United Kingdom) British
- Born: Hector James Hurst; 15 July 1992 (age 34) Lymington, Hampshire, England

FIA Formula 3 European Championship career
- Debut season: 2014
- Car number: 22
- Former teams: Team West-Tec
- Starts: 24
- Wins: 0
- Poles: 0
- Fastest laps: 0
- Best finish: 24th in 2014

Previous series
- 2014 2013 2012 2011 2011: FIA Formula Three European Championship; European F3 Open Championship; FIA Formula Two Championship; Formula Renault BARC; British Formula Renault FS

Hector James Hurst (born 15 July 1992) is a British former racing driver. Before his retirement from racing, he competed in high level single seater championships, including FIA Formula Two and the FIA Formula 3 European Championship.

== Racing record ==
=== Career summary ===
Season	Series	Team	Races	Wins	Poles	F/Laps	Podiums	Points	Position
2011	Formula Renault BARC	Scorpio Motorsport	12	0	0	0	0	116	13th
2011	Formula Renault UK Finals Series	Manor Competition	6	0	0	0	0	60	11th
2012	FIA Formula Two Championship	Motorsport Vision	16	0	0	0	0	27	10th
2012-13	MRF Challenge Formula 2000	MRF Racing	6	0	0	0	1	55	9th
2013	European F3 Open	EmiliodeVillota Motorsport	16	1	2	0	3	97	7th
2013	European F3 Open	Team West-Tec	16	1	2	0	3	97	7th
2014	FIA European Formula 3 Championship	Team West-Tec	24	0	0	0	0	3	24th

=== Complete FIA Formula Two Championship results ===
(key) (Races in bold indicate pole position) (Races in italics indicate fastest lap)

Year	1	2	3	4	5	6	7	8	9	10	11	12	13	14	15	16	Pos	Points
2012	SIL; 1; 7	SIL; 2; 10	ALG; 1; 9	ALG; 2; 7	NÜR; 1; 10	NÜR; 2; 11	SPA; 1; 9	SPA; 2; 9	BRH; 1; 7	BRH; 2; 12	LEC; 1; 9	LEC; 2 Ret	HUN; 1 Ret	HUN; 2; 14	MNZ; 1 Ret	MNZ; 2 Ret	10th	27
