= Alex Lynn =

British racing driver (born 1993)

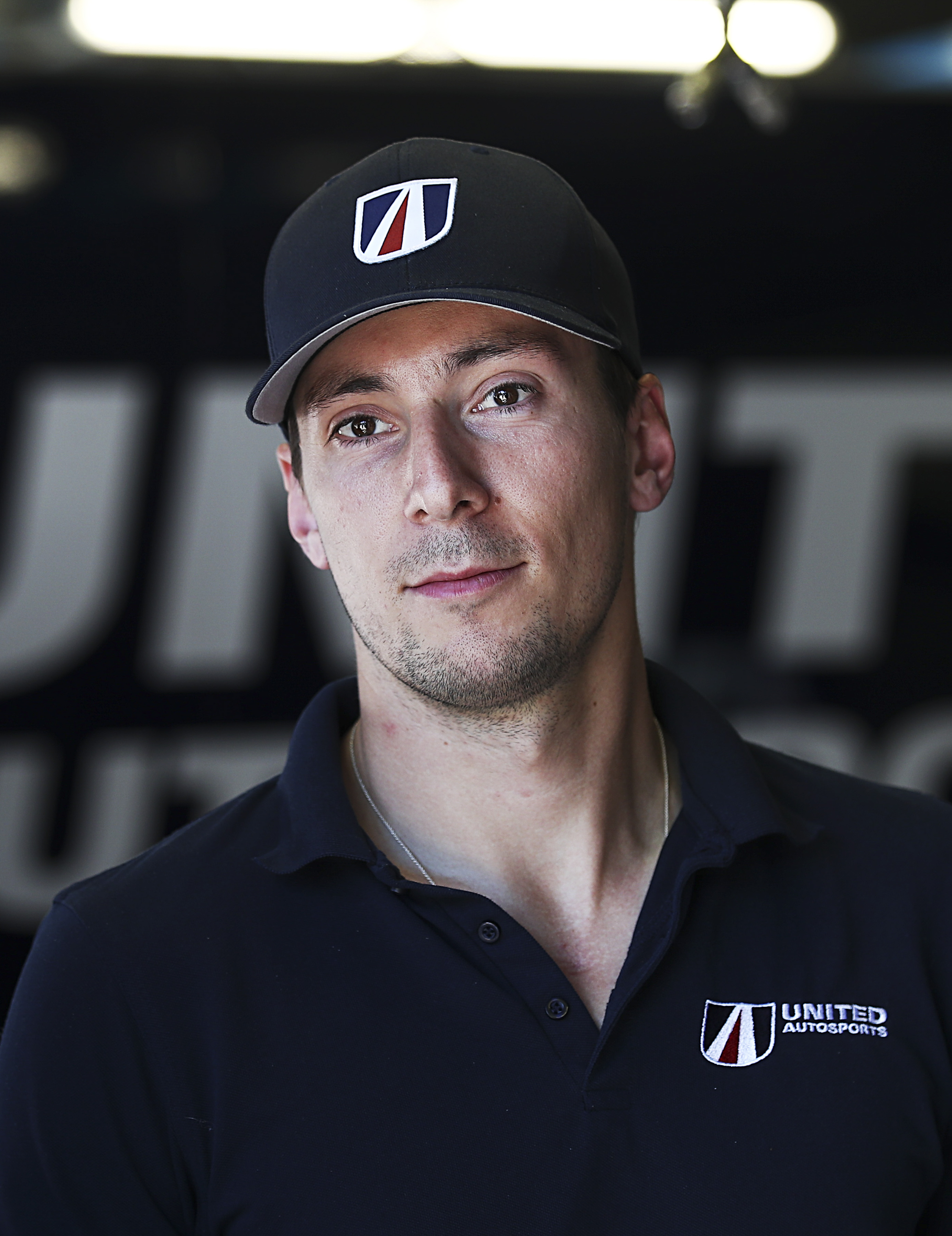
- Lynn during the 2022 6 Hours of Monza
- Nationality: (United Kingdom) British
- Born: Alexander George Lynn; 17 September 1993 (age 33) Great Dunmow, England

WEC career
- Current team: Cadillac Hertz Team Jota
- Categorisation: FIA Platinum
- Car number: 12
- Former teams: Manor Motorsport, G-Drive Racing, Aston Martin Racing, United Autosports
- Starts: 53
- Wins: 4
- Poles: 8
- Fastest laps: 3

Formula E career
- Debut season: 2016–17
- Car number: 94
- Former teams: Virgin Racing, Jaguar Racing, Mahindra Racing
- Starts: 42
- Championships: 0
- Wins: 1
- Podiums: 3
- Poles: 2
- Fastest laps: 0
- Best finish: 12th in 2020–21
- Finished last season: 12th (78 pts)

Previous series
- 2015 2014 2012–13 2012 2011 2011, 13 2010–11 2009–10: GP2 Series; GP3 Series; European F3; British Formula 3 Eurocup Formula Renault 2.0; Toyota Racing Series; Formula Renault UK; Formula Renault UK Winter Cup

Championship titles
- 2023 2014 2011 2010: European Le Mans Series; GP3 Series; Formula Renault UK; Formula Renault UK Winter Cup

Alexander George Lynn (born 17 September 1993) is a British racing driver who competes in the FIA World Endurance Championship for Cadillac Hertz Team Jota.

In single-seater racing, Lynn won the Macau Grand Prix in 2013 and the GP3 Series as a Red Bull junior in 2014. He simultaneously raced for DAMS in GP2 and tested for Williams in Formula One for two years. Lynn then entered Formula E, taking pole on debut for Virgin at the 2017 New York City ePrix. He won one race, for Mahindra at London in 2021.

In endurance racing, Lynn has been a factory driver for Aston Martin, Cadillac and McLaren. In IMSA, Lynn won the 12 Hours of Sebring for Cadillac in 2017 and 2022. In the FIA World Endurance Championship, Lynn set pole position at the 24 Hours of Le Mans in 2025 and won at Interlagos in 2025. He will join McLaren's new LMDh effort in 2027.

Beyond the top class, Lynn has won the 2020 24 Hours of Le Mans in LMGTE Pro for Aston Martin, and the 2023 European Le Mans Series in LMP2 for Algarve Pro Racing.

== Early career ==
Lynn is from Great Dunmow, Essex and as of 2020, lives in Parsons Green, London. He is a former pupil of Saint Nicholas School, Old Harlow, Essex.

=== Karting ===
Lynn began his racing career in karting at the age of eleven with Andy Cox Racing. In 2008, after four years in Mini Max and JICA classes, he switched to Ricky Flynn Motorsport for competing in KF2 category, finishing British KF2 championship on the sixth place in the series standings.

=== Formula Renault ===
In 2009, Lynn made his début in single-seaters taking part in the Formula Renault UK Winter Cup for Fortec Motorsport, finishing tenth in the standings. He finished the main Formula Renault UK Series in the same position, winning the Graduate Cup by scoring his first podium at the final race of the season at Brands Hatch.

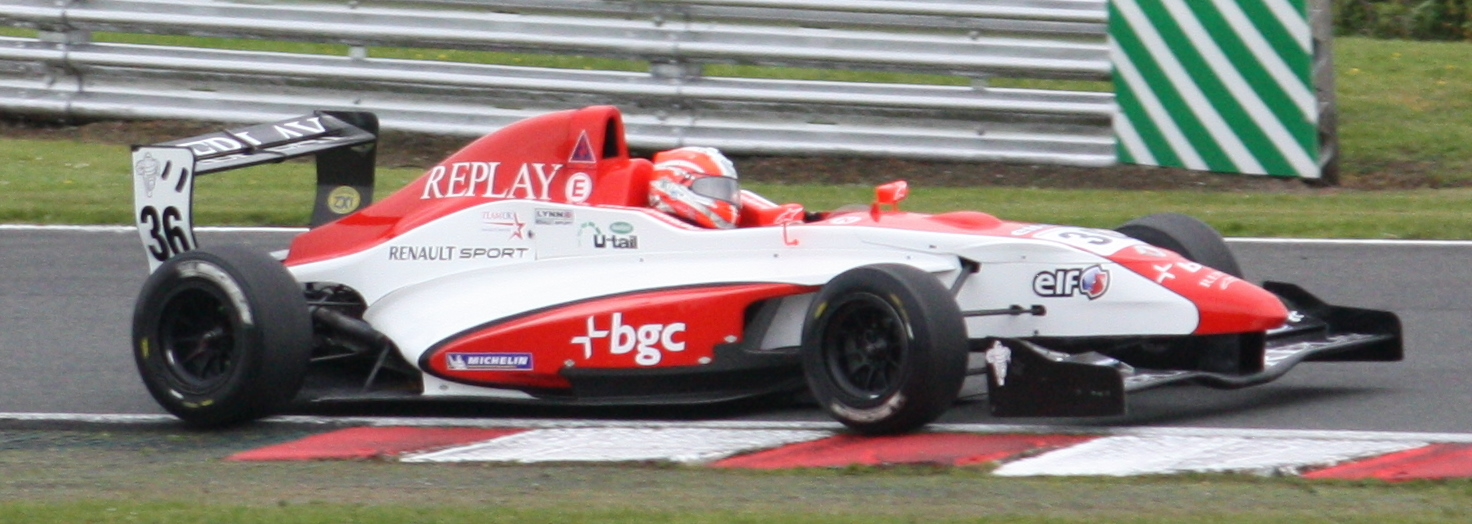
Lynn racing in Formula Renault.

Lynn continued his collaboration with Fortec for 2010 Formula Renault UK Winter Cup and the 2011 main series, becoming champion in both series, with three and twelve wins respectively. He also appeared in the Eurocup Formula Renault 2.0 at Hungaroring and Silverstone. His best result was second place from pole at Silverstone.

=== Toyota Racing Series ===
In the interval between 2010 Winter Cup and 2011 Formula Renault UK series he contested in Toyota Racing Series with Giles Motorsport, finishing ninth with a win in the first round of the series at Teretonga Park.

Lynn returned to New Zealand in January 2013 to contest the series again; this time with M2 Competition. four pole positions, three race wins, nine podiums and three fastest laps gave him second place overall and the highest placed international driver.

=== Formula Three ===
On 20 October 2011, it was announced that Lynn would represent Fortec Motorsports in 2012 for the fourth consecutive year in British Formula 3 Championship. In addition, he participated in selected Formula 3 Euro Series rounds. Lynn finished the 2012 British Formula 3 season in fourth place, with a race win at Silverstone and five podium places as well as two podiums in the Formula 3 Euro Series.

In November 2012, Lynn travelled to Macau to compete in the 59th SJM Macau Grand Prix. Lynn earned pole position for the qualification race, the first rookie to do so since 2006. In the race itself, Lynn finished on the podium in third position and the highest placed rookie driver overall.

On 15 November 2012, it was announced that Lynn would be moving to Prema Powerteam and racing in the FIA European F3 Championship for the 2013 season. Lynn achieved third overall in the championship and highest placed rookie driver, with three race wins, 14 podiums and five pole positions; including triple pole position at his home round at Brands Hatch.

In November 2013, Lynn returned to Macau to compete once again in the Star River Windsor Arch 60th Macau Grand Prix with Theodore Racing by Prema, a collaboration between SJM Holdings, Teddy Yip Jr's Theodore Racing and Prema Powerteam. Theodore Racing had last appeared at the Grand Prix in 1992 and was celebrating 30 years since they had won the event with Ayrton Senna at the wheel. Lynn won the qualification race to give him pole position for the main race and went on to dominate the main race from start to finish; becoming the first Briton to win the Grand Prix since 2007.

=== GP3 Series ===
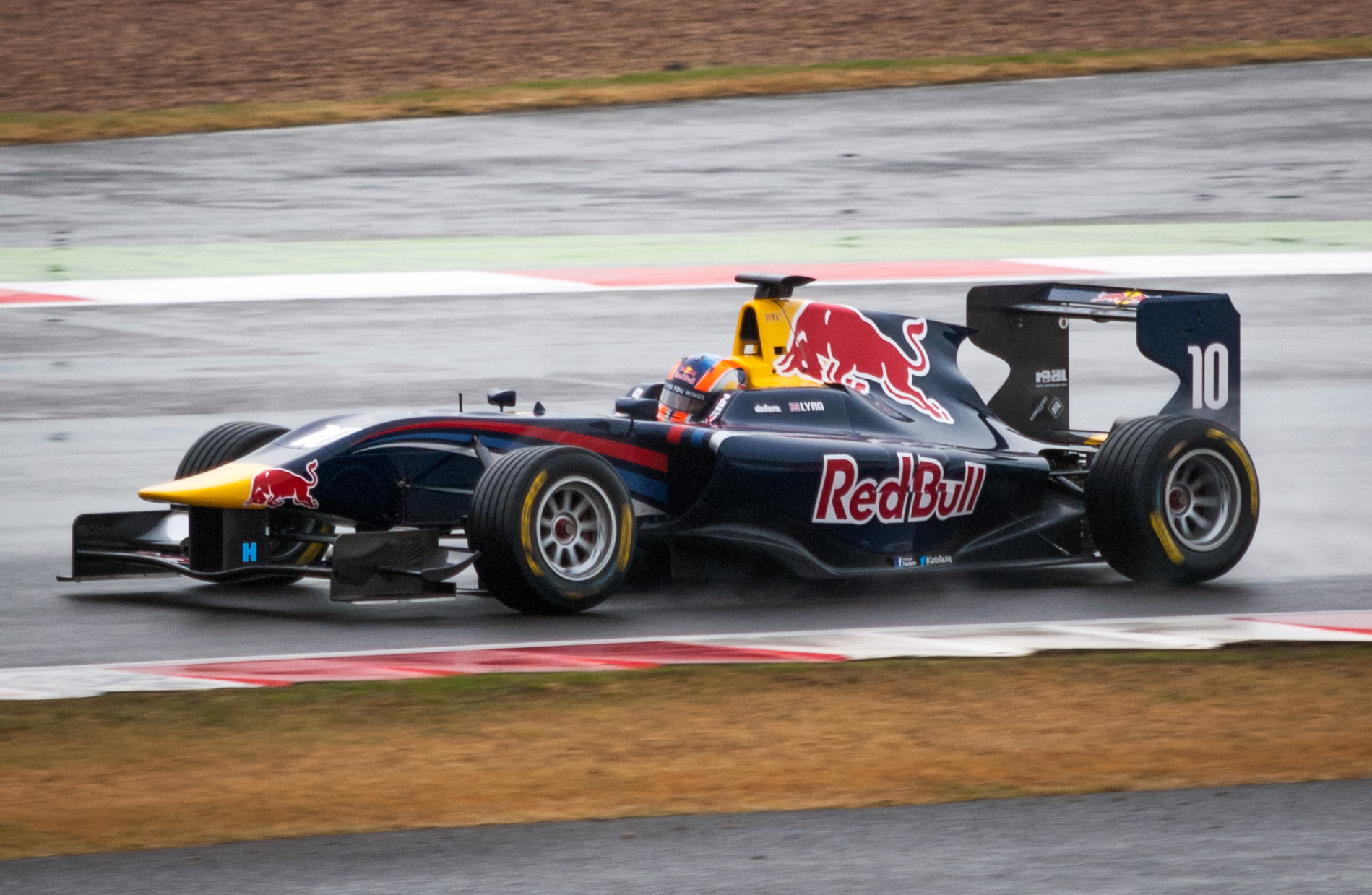
Lynn at Silverstone Circuit in 2014

Lynn competed in the GP3 Series in 2014 for Carlin Motorsport as a member of the Red Bull Junior Team programme. He won on his debut at the Circuit de Catalunya supporting the 2014 Spanish Grand Prix, starting from pole and setting the fastest race lap to take the maximum points from the race. In the sprint race he finished 18th, but still led the championship after its first round. Lynn won again at the Red Bull Ring in Austria, setting pole position before securing a comfortable win over his teammate, Emil Bernstorff. But again he was out of luck in the reverse grid race two, finishing 20th after picking up a lap-one puncture. Lynn was disappointed to miss out on a home win in the third round at Silverstone in the UK, but second in race one and a fighting sixth in race two helped him to maintain his championship lead. In round four at Hockenheim in Germany, Lynn consolidated that lead by finishing second and third in the two races. He then recorded two fourth-placed finishes at the Hungaroring to extend his title advantage to 31 points over Richie Stanaway heading into the summer break. In Belgium, he managed to score four championship points to take eighth place and the reverse grid pole for the following sprint race. He dominated the race, leading from start to finish. A similar situation happened in the next round at Monza in Italy, where Lynn finished in sixth place for the feature race and managed to get second in the sprint race due. Lynn clinched the title in the season-ending round in Abu Dhabi.

=== GP2 Series ===
==== 2015 ====
Having won the GP3 Series title in 2014, Lynn was rewarded with a day of testing with GP2 team ART Grand Prix. He followed this up with a day of testing with Carlin. In early January, Lynn, along with fellow Red Bull Junior Pierre Gasly, signed with DAMS in order to win the GP2 Series crown in 2015. He finished sixth in the championship, having scored two wins at Barcelona and the Hungaroring.

==== 2016 ====
Lynn remained with DAMS for the 2016 season, scoring two victories in the sprint races at Barcelona and Hockenheim. After finishing the year sixth in the standings again, he left at the end of the season.

=== Formula One ===
Following his win of the GP3 title, it was announced Lynn would partake in the post-season testing, driving for Lotus F1. On 28 January 2015, Lynn was confirmed as the new development driver for the Williams F1 team, thereby severing his ties with Red Bull.

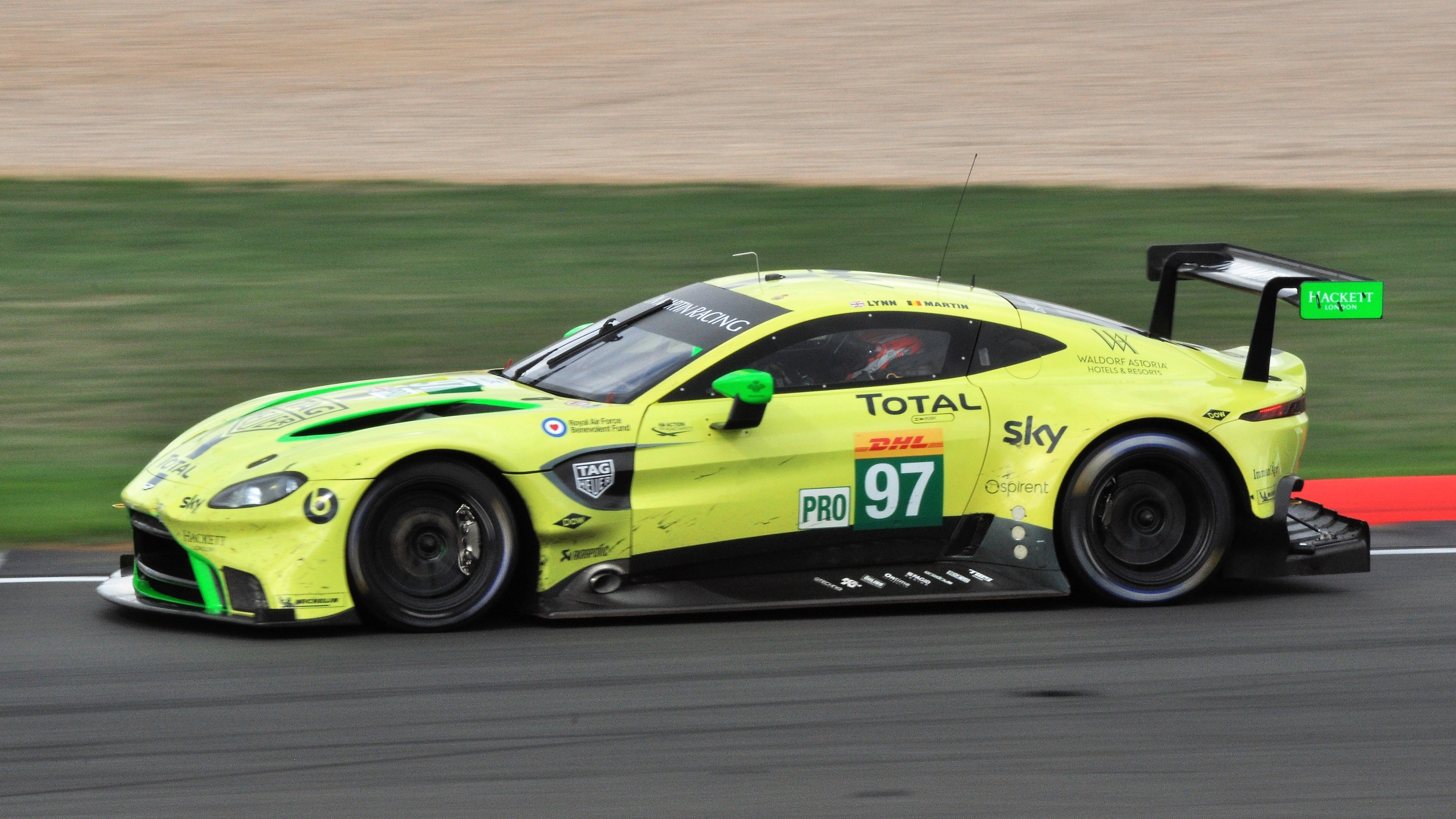
Lynn racing in the 2018 6 Hours of Silverstone.

== Formula E career ==
=== 2016–17 season ===
In August 2016, Lynn was confirmed as one of four drivers partaking in Jaguar's pre-season test at Donington Park. Lynn landed the role of reserve driver for DS Virgin Racing in January 2017, and made his racing debut in July at the New York ePrix, in place of José María López due to the latter's WEC commitments. He qualified on pole in his first race, but retired from both the New York races.

=== 2017–18 season ===
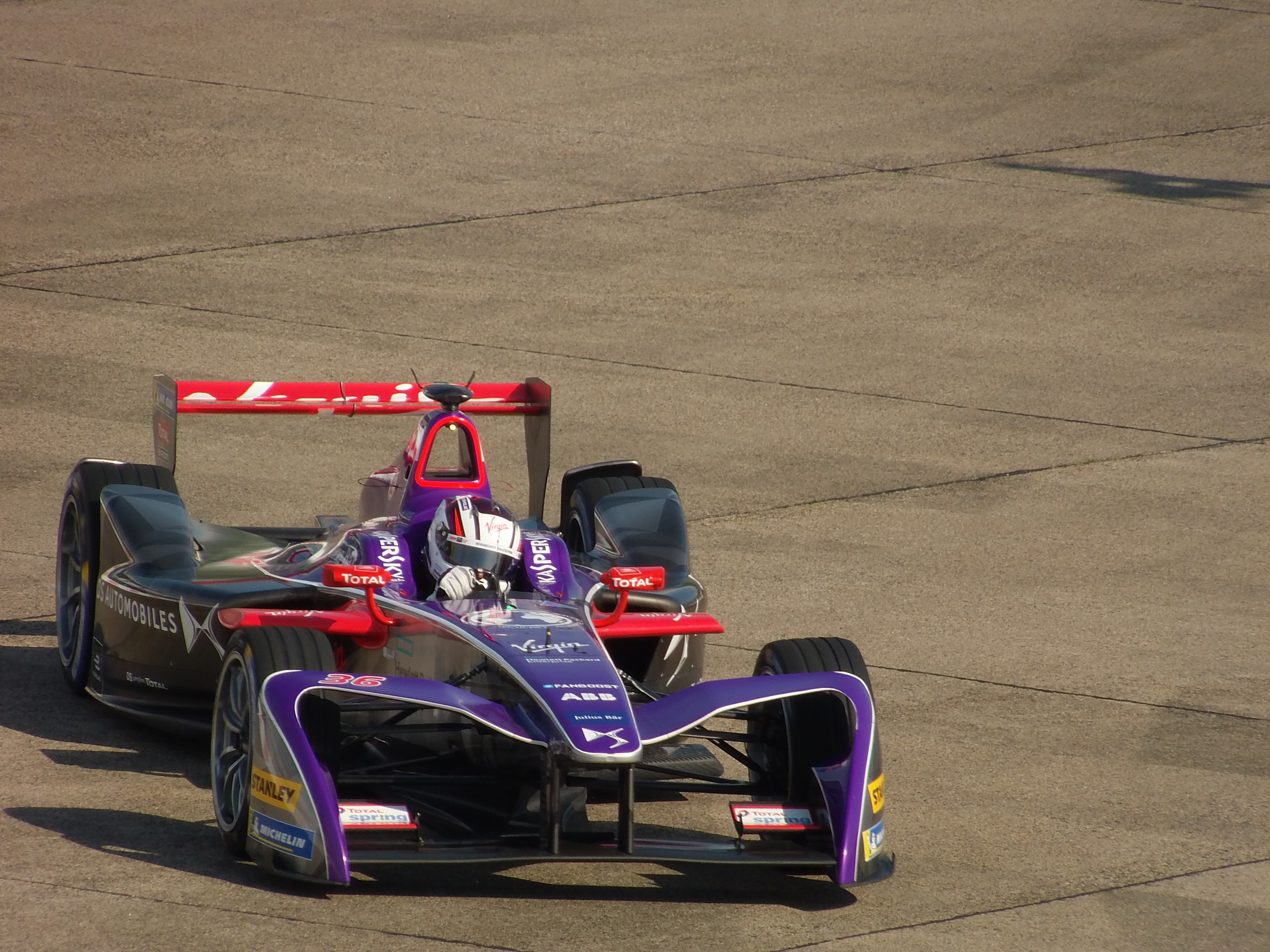
Lynn driving for DS Virgin Racing at the 2018 Berlin ePrix.

On 5 September 2017, it was confirmed that Lynn signed a multi-year deal to race full-time in Formula E for DS Virgin Racing starting in the 2017–18 Formula E season. Despite good qualifying performances in three of the season's first four races, he lost grid position in all of the aforementioned events, but still managed three successive points-scoring finishes. He finished the season with five point scoring results, 17 points, and 16th in the standings.

=== 2018–19 season ===
Following his departure from Virgin, it was announced on 28 March 2019 that Lynn would replace Nelson Piquet Jr. at Jaguar from the seventh round of the 2018–19 season onwards. He scored points twice from the seven races, finishing with ten points, and 18th in the standings.

=== 2019–20 season ===
Lynn left Jaguar, and became the test and reserve driver for Mahindra Racing for the 2018–19 season. Following Pascal Wehrlein leaving the team mid-season, Lynn once again drove the second half of the season, just like one year prior with Jaguar. He would perform better, finishing in the points three times, earning 16 points total, enough for 17th in the final standings.

=== 2020–21 season ===
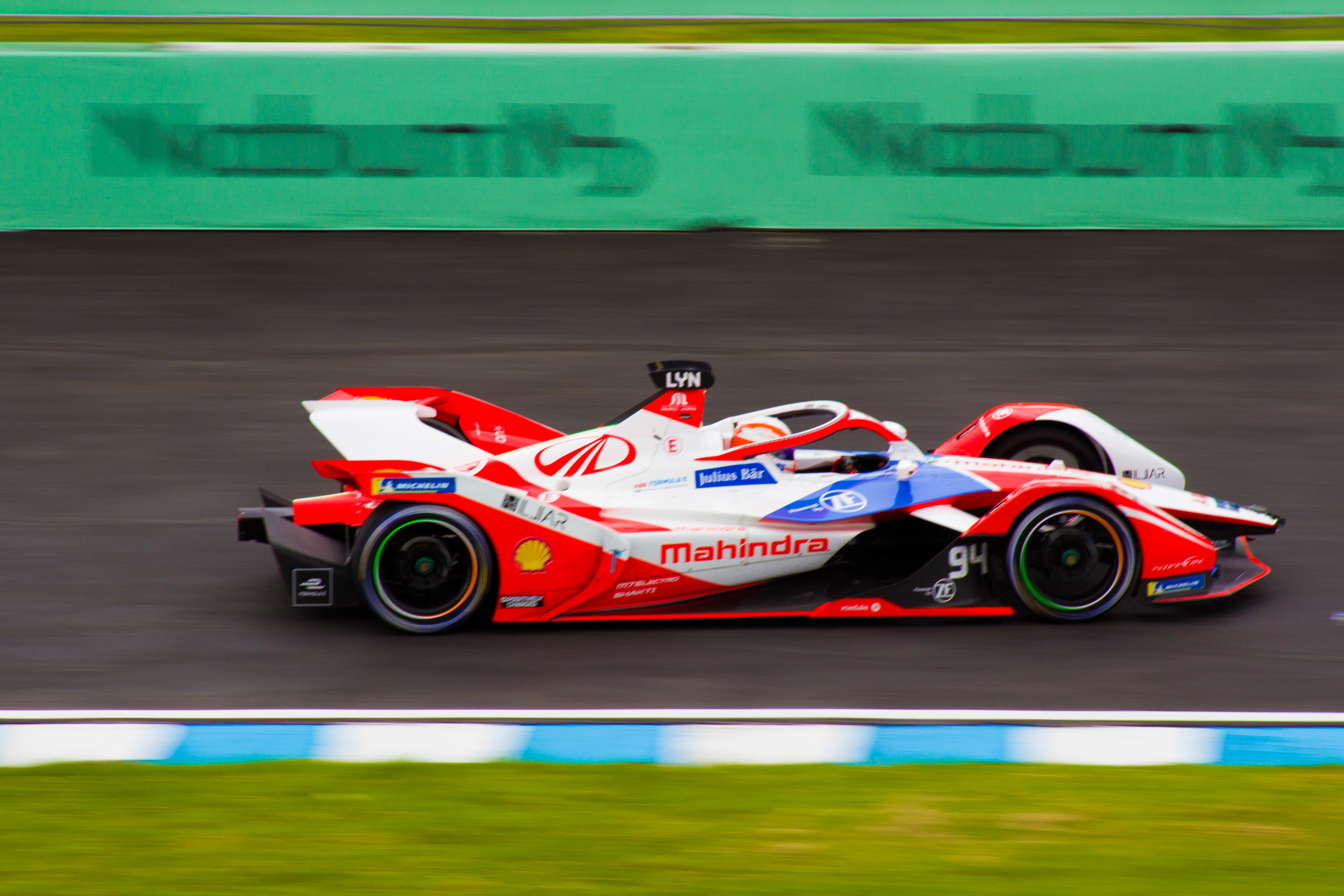
Lynn driving for Mahindra Racing at the 2021 Puebla ePrix.

Lynn was announced to partner Alexander Sims as the official driver line up of the Mahindra Racing Formula E team for the 2020–21 Formula E season. Lynn was taken to hospital after a crash in race 2 of the 2021 Diriyah ePrix, in which he launched over the rear wing of Mitch Evans' Jaguar, but wasn't seriously injured, and could race in all of the following races of the calendar. Lynn recorded his first podium in the 2021 Valencia ePrix, and then recorded another podium in the first race of the 2021 London ePrix, and won his first Formula E race at race 2 of his home ePrix in London. He finished the season with three podiums, 78 points, and 12th in the standings, just 21 points off the champion Nyck de Vries. Lynn was replaced by Oliver Rowland for the 2021–22 Formula E season, and left Formula E after being unable to secure a seat.

== Hypercar career ==
=== 2023: Move to Cadillac and overall Le Mans podium ===
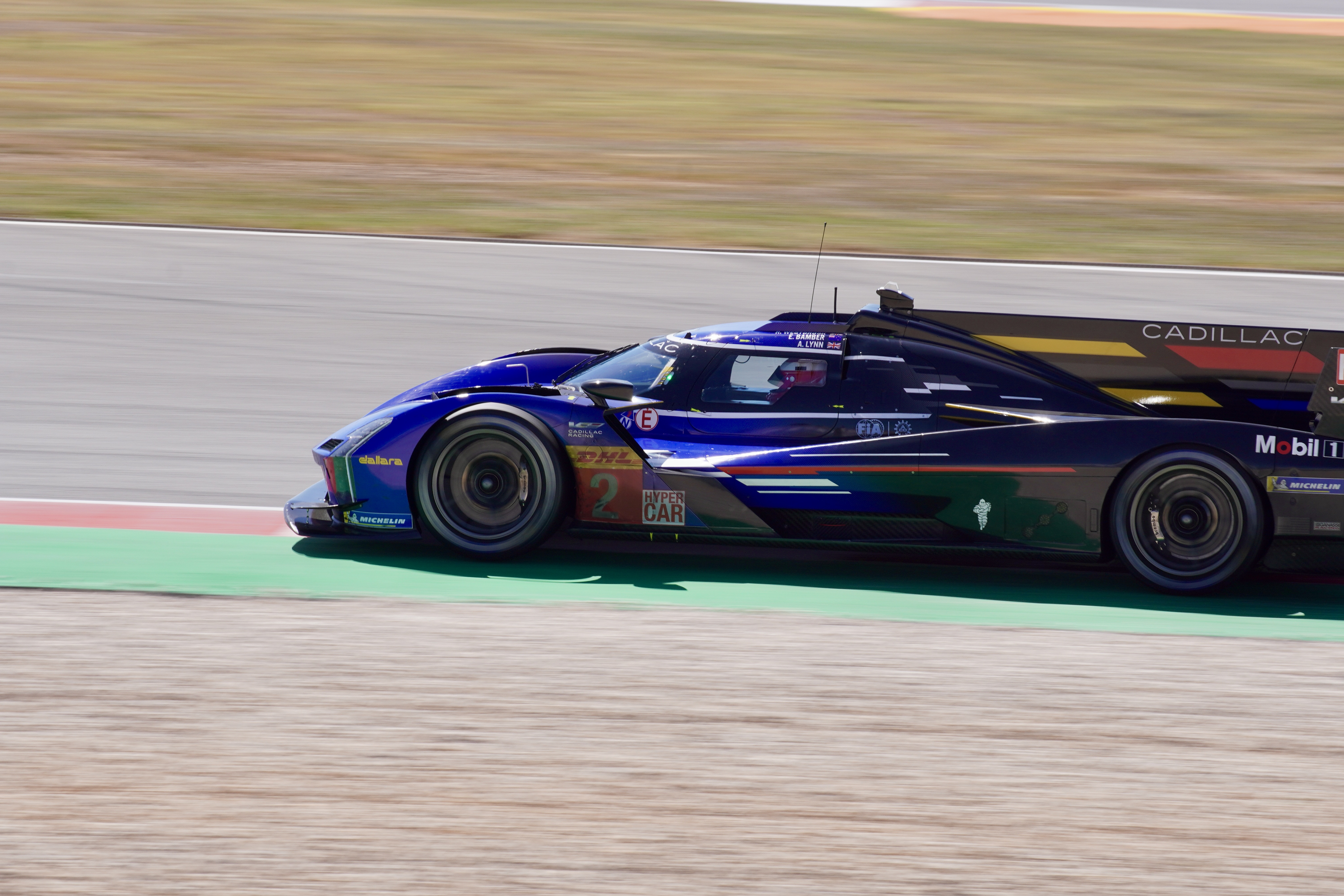
The #2 Cadillac V-Series.R driven by Lynn, Bamber and Westbrook at the 2023 6 Hours of Portimão

Lynn progressed to the Le Mans Hypercar category for the 2023 WEC season, driving a Cadillac V-Series.R alongside Earl Bamber and Richard Westbrook.

In January 2023, Lynn made his first appearance in the IMSA GTP category as the new class, and new LMDh cars, debuted at the 2023 Rolex 24 Hours of Daytona, alongside his to-be WEC teammates in the No. 02 Cadillac V-Series.R entered by Chip Ganassi Racing. Lynn qualified the car fifth at the Roar Before The 24, with the team going on to finish 4th in the race. Lynn completed over 8h 50m of driver time, the third most of any driver.

March saw Lynn's first appearance in the WEC's Hypercar class at the 1000 Miles of Sebring. The British driver was once again on qualifying duties for the No. 2 Cadillac, claiming fifth on the grid as the fastest of the new LMDh runners – only behind the factory Toyota and Ferrari entries. The race saw a similar result, with Lynn and the No. 2 crew locked in a race-long fight with the No. 6 Porsche Penske Motorsport Porsche 963, eventually the Cadillac team finished fourth overall, narrowly missing out on an overall podium by ten seconds to the recovering No. 50 Ferrari AF Corse 499P.

The second round of the season, the 6 Hours of Portimao, saw the Cadillac team score a second consecutive top-five finish despite struggling to have the overall pace of the other manufacturers. Qualifying in eighth on the grid in the hands of Westbrook, the No. 2 eventually finished fourth despite having to make an off-sequence pitstop early in the race. The drivers were notably better on tyres than their competitors, allowing them to gradually make their way up the field across the six hour race.

At the final race before Le Mans, the 6 Hours of Spa, the No. 2 Cadillac scored a third top five finish in Hypercar, surviving typically tricky conditions at the Belgian circuit. Bamber qualified the car in fourth, but spent the first part of the race fighting up the order after starting on wet tyres. Lynn took the wheel over two hours into the race, and be involved in a thrilling four-car fight for the final podium spot with both Ferraris and the No. 5 Porsche Penske Motorsport car. Lynn moved up to third place in the pitstop cycle before handing the car over to Westbrook with just over an hour to go.

Lynn scored his first overall podium at the 24 hours of Le Mans where the No. 2 Cadillac finished third – driving alongside WEC teammates Bamber and Westbrook. Lynn stated "I'm super happy taking Cadillac back to Le Mans and finishing on the podium."

To pay homage to Derek Bell, one of the most successful British sportscar drivers in history, Lynn wore a tribute helmet at Le Mans; carrying Bell's white, red and blue design.

Teammate Bamber took the car through to Hyperpole, qualifying sixth and the highest of the three Cadillacs entered in the Hypercar class. The No. 2 avoided drama in the opening two hours in mixed conditions, even leading the race overall, before Lynn took over and heavy, random rain showers scrambled the field. However, Lynn kept the car on track, and consistently on-pace with the front of the pack, keeping the car inside the top five into the night. Westbrook's stint saw some of the worst weather, but Lynn escaped unscathed from a spin at Mulsanne. Throughout the night the trio exchanged stints, with the No. 2 unable to match the pace of the No. 8 Toyota and No. 51 Ferrari but capable of establishing a gap to the closest competition. By the morning the No. 2 was locked-in to third place, ahead of the recovering sister No. 3 Cadillac, and looked poised for a surprise result should the battling No. 8 and No. 51 hit trouble. Lynn finished his final stint in the car with two and a half hours to go having completed 126 laps across the race. The No. 2 crossed the line a lap down on the winning No. 51 Ferrari, but with Cadillac's first overall podium at Le Mans secured.

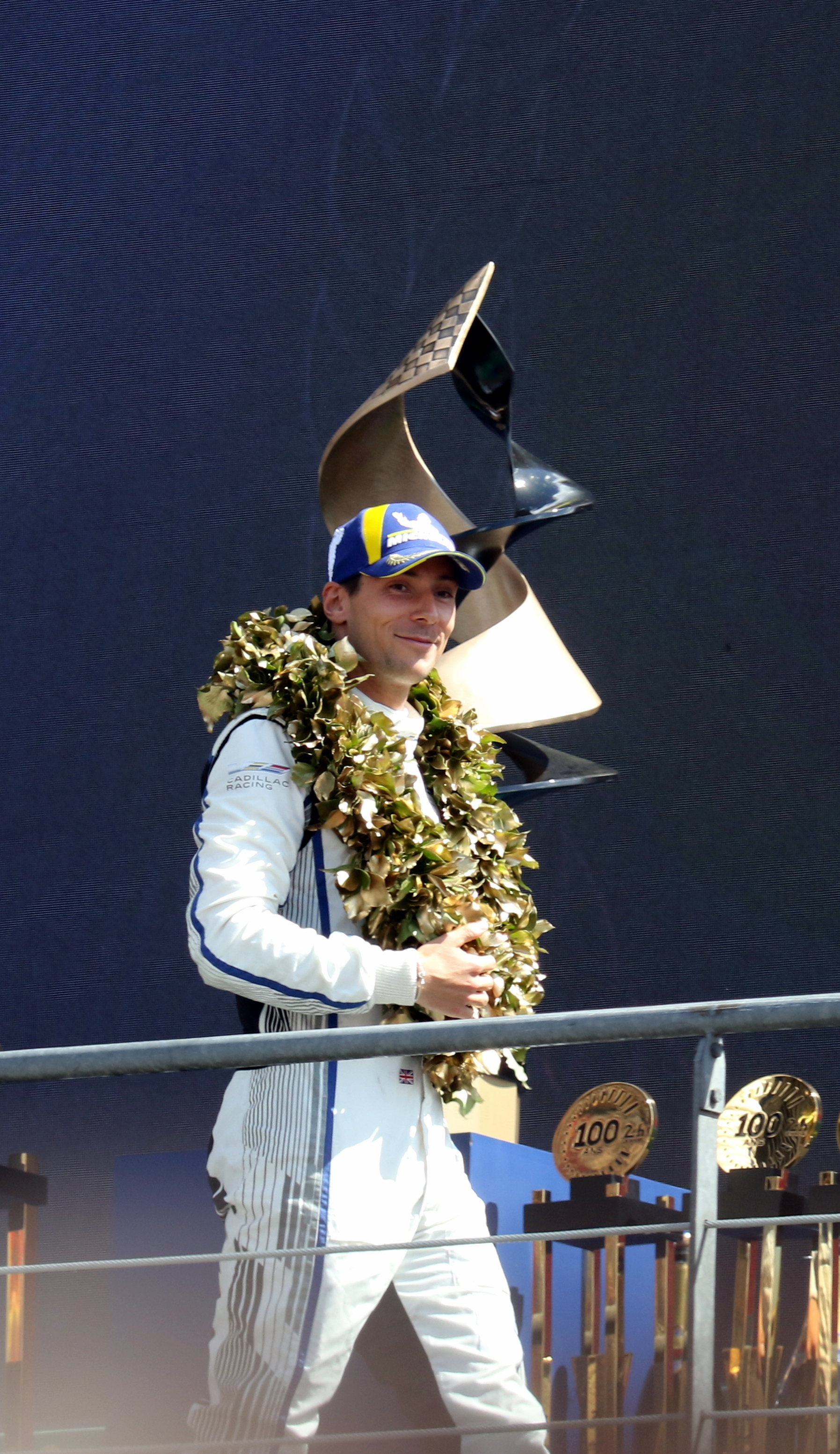
Lynn on the podium at the 2023 24 Hours of Le Mans.

A month later, the No. 2 finished tenth at the 6 Hours of Monza. Lynn qualified the car in fifth, the highest of the LMDh cars in Hypercar, only 0.362s behind pole, and ran in the podium positions early on after an alternative pit strategy vaulted the No. 2 into the leading group. However, the car faded later in the race after a series of minor issues for all three drivers.

At the penultimate round of the WEC season, the 6 Hours of Fuji, Lynn once again took on qualifying duties. In a damp session, Lynn qualified fifth on slick tyres, ahead of both factory Ferrari Hypercars. The No. 2 ran consistently in the top ten before a loose wheel for Bamber forced the team to spend time in the garage, dropping them down the order. Eventually the car finished tenth, scoring the final point.

Coming into the final round of the season, the 8 Hours of Bahrain, the Lynn, Bamber and Westbrook were fifth in the points standings with a 16-point advantage over the #6 Porsche Penske Motorsport driver trio. Lynn once again took on qualifying duties, and arguably had his best session of the season, qualifying third behind the two Toyotas – Lynn's time was the only non-Toyota within a second of the pole lap, and the fastest of the LMDh cars in the category. Bamber took the start, but a major lock-up at the first corner saw him make contact with the No. 7 Toyota, not only did the No. 2 Cadillac drop down the order, but Bamber also received a 90-second stop/go penalty for the incident – a time deficit to the field that the team never fully recovered with the race running without a safety car intervention, eventually finishing in eleventh.

Lynn finished the year fifth in the points standings with 72 points, and with the No. 2 Cadillac the highest scoring LMDh in the hotly contested Hypercar field.

=== 2024: Second season in the top class ===
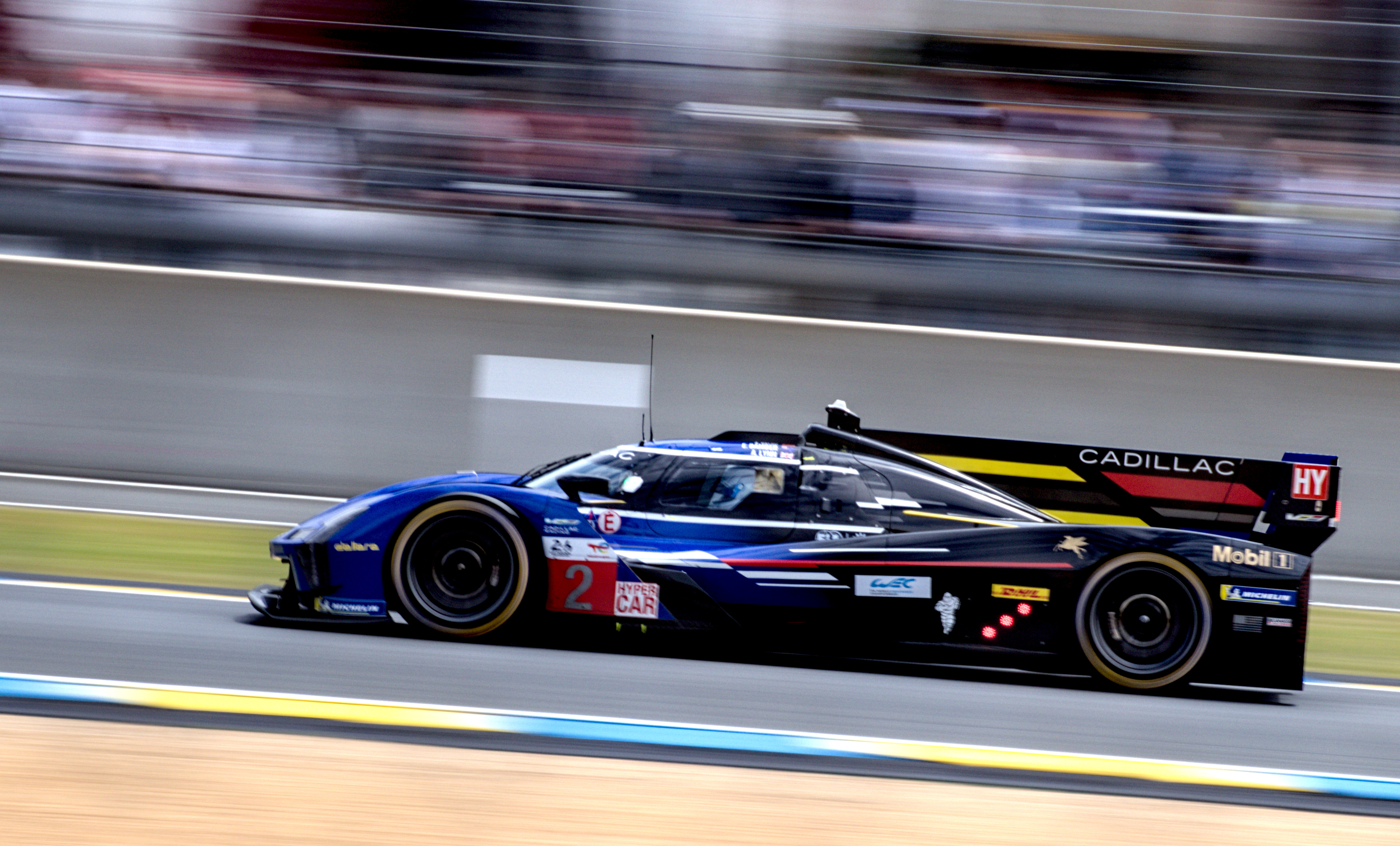
Lynn took seventh at the 2024 24 Hours of Le Mans.

Lynn was confirmed as part of Cadillac's sole WEC entry, the British driver returning to race the No. 2 car in the full 2024 season alongside 2023 teammate Bamber. The duo would be joined by one-off driver entries at the Qatar 1812 km, 24 Hours of Le Mans and 8 Hours of Bahrain, but would contest the six hour races on their own.

== Racing record ==
=== Karting career summary ===
Season	Series	Team	Position
2006	Kartmasters British Grand Prix — ICA Junior		12th
2006	Super 1 National Championship — ICA Junior		29th
2007	Kartmasters British Grand Prix — ICA Junior		21st
2007	Easykart International Grand Finals — 100cc	Easykart UK	DNF
2007	Super 1 National Championship — ICA Junior		16th
2008	Copa Campeones Trophy — KF2	Ricky Flynn Motorsport	DNF
2008	Silver Cup — KF2	Ricky Flynn Motorsport	5th
2008	Bridgestone Cup Europe — KF2		15th
2008	Trofeo delle Industrie — KF2	Ricky Flynn Motorsport	6th
2008	Super 1 National Championship — KF3		11th
2008	Andrea Margutti Trophy — KF3	Savani Competition Srl	17th
2009	Super 1 National Championship — KF2		6th
2009	Asia-Pacific Championship — KF2	Ricky Flynn Motorsport	19th
2009	South Garda Winter Cup — KF2	Ricky Flynn Motorsport	DNF
2009	WSK International Series — KF2	Ricky Flynn Motorsport	34th

=== Racing career summary ===
Season	Series	Team	Races	Wins	Poles	F/Laps	Podiums	Points	Position
2009	Formula Renault UK Winter Series	Fortec Motorsport	4	0	0	0	0	40	10th
2010	Formula Renault UK	Fortec Motorsport	20	0	0	0	1	210	10th
2010	Formula Renault UK Winter Series	Fortec Motorsport	6	3	1	1	3	40	**1st**
2011	Formula Renault UK	Fortec Motorsport	20	12	14	10	15	521	**1st**
2011	Eurocup Formula Renault 2.0	Fortec Motorsport	4	0	1	0	1	26	14th
2011	Toyota Racing Series	Giles Motorsport	12	1	0	1	3	514	9th
2012	British Formula 3 International Series	Fortec Motorsports	28	1	2	5	9	253	4th
2012	FIA Formula 3 European Championship	Fortec Motorsports	10	0	0	0	2	N/A	NC†
2012	Masters of Formula 3	Fortec Motorsports	1	0	0	0	0	N/A	7th
2012	Macau Grand Prix	Fortec Motorsports	1	0	1	0	1	N/A	**3rd**
2013	FIA Formula 3 European Championship	Prema Powerteam	30	3	5	4	14	339.5	**3rd**
2013	Masters of Formula 3	Prema Powerteam	1	0	0	0	1	N/A	**2nd**
2013	Macau Grand Prix	Theodore Racing by Prema	1	1	1	0	1	N/A	**1st**
2013	Toyota Racing Series	M2 Competition	15	3	4	3	9	803	**2nd**
2014	GP3 Series	Carlin	18	3	2	3	8	207	**1st**
2014	Formula One	Lotus F1 Team	Test driver						
2015	GP2 Series	DAMS	22	2	2	3	4	110	6th
2015	Formula One	Williams Martini Racing	Development driver						
2016	GP2 Series	DAMS	22	3	0	0	5	124	6th
2016	Formula One	Williams Martini Racing	Development driver						
2016	FIA World Endurance Championship – LMP2	Manor	3	0	1	2	0	4.5	30th
2016–17	Formula E	DS Virgin Racing	2	0	1	0	0	3	23rd
2016–17	Formula E	Panasonic Jaguar Racing	Test driver						
2017	FIA World Endurance Championship – LMP2	G-Drive Racing	5	1	3	0	1	54	15th
2017	24 Hours of Le Mans – LMP2	G-Drive Racing	1	0	1	0	0	N/A	DNF
2017	IMSA SportsCar Championship – Prototype	Wayne Taylor Racing	1	1	0	0	1	35	29th
2017	24 Hours of Nürburgring – SP9	BMW Team Schnitzer	1	0	0	0	0	N/A	DNF
2017–18	Formula E	DS Virgin Racing	12	0	0	0	0	17	16th
2018	24 Hours of Le Mans – LMGTE Pro	Aston Martin Racing	1	0	0	0	0	N/A	13th
2018	24 Hours of Nürburgring – SP8	AMR Performance Centre	1	0	0	0	0	N/A	5th
2018–19	FIA World Endurance Championship – LMGTE Pro	Aston Martin Racing	8	1	0	0	1	66	8th
2018–19	Formula E	Panasonic Jaguar Racing	7	0	0	0	0	10	18th
2019	Blancpain GT Series Endurance Cup	R-Motorsport	3	0	0	1	1	38	6th
2019	24 Hours of Le Mans – LMGTE Pro	Aston Martin Racing	1	0	0	0	0	N/A	12th
2019–20	FIA World Endurance Championship – LMGTE Pro	Aston Martin Racing	7	1	0	1	5	142	4th
2019–20	Formula E	Mahindra Racing	6	0	0	0	0	16	17th
2019–20	Formula E	Panasonic Jaguar Racing	Reserve driver						
2020	24 Hours of Le Mans – LMGTE Pro	Aston Martin Racing	1	1	0	1	1	N/A	**1st**
2020–21	Formula E	Mahindra Racing	15	1	0	0	3	78	12th
2022	IMSA SportsCar Championship – DPi	Cadillac Racing	10	1	0	1	4	3191	4th
2022	FIA World Endurance Championship – LMP2	United Autosports USA	5	0	0	0	1	75	7th
2022	24 Hours of Le Mans – LMP2	United Autosports USA	1	0	0	0	0	N/A	6th
2023	FIA World Endurance Championship – Hypercar	Cadillac Racing	7	0	0	0	1	72	5th
2023	IMSA SportsCar Championship – GTP	Cadillac Racing	1	0	0	0	0	306	21st
2023	24 Hours of Le Mans – Hypercar	Cadillac Racing	1	0	0	0	1	N/A	**3rd**
2023	European Le Mans Series – LMP2	Algarve Pro Racing	6	2	2	0	5	113	**1st**
2024	FIA World Endurance Championship – Hypercar	Cadillac Racing	8	0	1	0	0	26	20th
2024	24 Hours of Le Mans – Hypercar	Cadillac Racing	1	0	0	0	0	N/A	7th
2024	European Le Mans Series – LMP2	Algarve Pro Racing	6	0	0	1	2	50	5th
2024	IMSA SportsCar Championship – GTD	AWA	1	0	0	0	0	117	73rd
2024	Nürburgring Langstrecken-Serie – SP9	Falken Motorsports	1	0	0	0	0	0	NC†
2025	FIA World Endurance Championship – Hypercar	Cadillac Hertz Team Jota	8	1	3	0	1	93	5th
2025	24 Hours of Le Mans - Hypercar	Cadillac Hertz Team Jota	1	0	1	0	0	N/A	5th
2026	FIA World Endurance Championship - Hypercar	Cadillac Hertz Team Jota	2	0	0	0	0	8	22nd
2026	European Le Mans Series - LMP2	Algarve Pro Racing	1	0	0	0	0	8	17th

^{†} As Lynn was a guest driver, he was ineligible to score points.

=== Complete Formula Renault 2.0 UK Championship results ===
(key) (Races in bold indicate pole position; races in italics indicate fastest lap)

Year	Entrant	1	2	3	4	5	6	7	8	9	10	11	12	13	14	15	16	17	18	19	20	21	DC	Points
2010	Fortec Motorsport	THR; 1; 9	THR; 2; 9	ROC; 1; 14	ROC; 2; 13	BHGP; 1 C	BHGP; 2; 8	OUL; 1 Ret	OUL; 2; 9	CRO; 1; 10	CRO; 2; 16	SNE; 1; 11	SNE; 2; 11	SIL; 1; 6	SIL; 2; 12	SIL; 3; 16	KNO; 1; 12	KNO; 2; 6	SIL; 1; 10	SIL; 2; 18	BHI; 1; 8	BHI; 2; 3	10th	193
2011	Fortec Motorsport	**BHI**; **1**; 1	**BHI**; **2**; 1	**DON**; **1**; 1	DON; 2; 2	**THR**; **1**; 1	**THR**; **2**; 1	**OUL**; **1**; 1	**OUL**; **2**; 1	CRO; 1; 5	**CRO**; **2** DSQ	SNE; 1; 3	**SNE**; **2**; 1	**SIL**; **1**; 1	**SIL**; **2**; 1	ROC; 1; 10	**ROC**; **2**; 1	BHGP; 1; 2	BHGP; 2; 9	**SIL**; **1**; 1	**SIL**; **2**; 9		1st	521

=== Complete Eurocup Formula Renault 2.0 results ===
(key) (Races in bold indicate pole position; races in italics indicate fastest lap)

Year	Entrant	1	2	3	4	5	6	7	8	9	10	11	12	13	14	DC	Points
2011	Fortec Motorsport	ALC; 1	ALC; 2	SPA; 1	SPA; 2	NÜR; 1	NÜR; 2	HUN; 1	HUN; 2; 6	SIL; 1; 20	SIL; 2 Ret	**LEC**; **1**; 2	LEC; 2	CAT; 1	CAT; 2	14th	26

=== Complete Toyota Racing Series results ===
(key) (Races in bold indicate pole position; races in italics indicate fastest lap)

Year	Entrant	1	2	3	4	5	6	7	8	9	10	11	12	13	14	15	DC	Points
2011	Giles Motorsport	TER; 1; 4	TER; 2; 6	TER; 3; 1	TIM; 1; 2	TIM; 2; 3	TIM; 3; 10	HMP; 1; 4	HMP; 2; 4	HMP; 3 Ret	MAN; 1; 9	MAN; 2; 9	MAN; 3 Ret	TAU; 1	TAU; 2	TAU; 3	9th	514
2013	M2 Competition	TER; 1; 3	TER; 2; 3	TER; 3 Ret	TIM; 1; 7	TIM; 2; 6	TIM; 3; 1	**TAU**; **1**; 1	TAU; 2; 8	**TAU**; **3**; 1	HMP; 1; 2	HMP; 2; 5	HMP; 3; 2	**MAN**; **1**; 3	MAN; 2; 15	**MAN**; **3**; 2	2nd	803

=== Complete British Formula Three Championship results ===
(key) (Races in bold indicate pole position) (Races in italics indicate fastest lap)

Year	Entrant	Chassis	Engine	1	2	3	4	5	6	7	8	9	10	11	12	13	14	15	16	17	18	19	20	21	22	23	24	25	26	27	28	29	DC	Points
2012	Fortec Motorsport	Dallara F312	Mercedes HWA	OUL; 1; 5	OUL; 2 Ret	OUL; 3; 6	MNZ; 1; 5	MNZ; 2; 7	MNZ; 3; 3	PAU; 1; 3	PAU; 2; 7	ROC; 1; 2	ROC; 2; 7	ROC; 3; 2	BRH; 1; 3	BRH; 2; 8	BRH; 3; 4	NOR; 1; 19	NOR; 2; 9	NOR; 3; 9	SPA; 1; 6	SPA; 2 C	SPA; 3; 11	SNE; 1; 3	SNE; 2; 5	SNE; 3; 4	**SIL**; **1**; 4	SIL; 2; 6	**SIL**; **3**; 1	DON; 1; 3	DON; 2 Ret	DON; 3; 2	4th	253

=== Complete FIA Formula 3 European Championship results ===
(key) (Races in bold indicate pole position) (Races in italics indicate fastest lap)

Year	Entrant	Engine	1	2	3	4	5	6	7	8	9	10	11	12	13	14	15	16	17	18	19	20	21	22	23	24	25	26	27	28	29	30	DC	Points
2012	Fortec Motorsport	Mercedes	HOC; 1; 10	HOC; 2; 4	LEC; 1; 3	LEC; 2; 7	BRH; 1	BRH; 2	RBR; 1	RBR; 2	NOR; 1; 19	NOR; 2; 9	SPA; 1; 6	SPA; 2; 5	NÜR; 1	NÜR; 2	ZAN; 1	ZAN; 2	VAL; 1	VAL; 2	HOC; 1 Ret	HOC; 2; 3											NC†	0†
2013	Prema Powerteam	Mercedes	MNZ; 1; 8	MNZ; 2; 6	MNZ; 3; 3	SIL; 1; 2	SIL; 2; 6	**SIL**; **3**; 3	HOC; 1; 15	HOC; 2; 7	HOC; 3; 6	**BRH**; **1**; 1	**BRH**; **2**; 2	**BRH**; **3** Ret	RBR; 1; 7	RBR; 2; 12	RBR; 3; 8	NOR; 1; 3	NOR; 2; 1	NOR; 3; 3	NÜR; 1; 14	NÜR; 2; 7	NÜR; 3; 6	ZAN; 1; 3	ZAN; 2; 2	ZAN; 3; 3	VAL; 1; 3	**VAL**; **2**; 1	VAL; 3; 4	HOC; 1; 4	HOC; 2; 2	HOC; 3; 8	3rd	339.5

† – As Lynn was a guest driver, he was ineligible to score points.

=== Complete GP3 Series results ===
(key) (Races in bold indicate pole position) (Races in italics indicate fastest lap)

Year	Entrant	1	2	3	4	5	6	7	8	9	10	11	12	13	14	15	16	17	18	Pos	Points
2014	Carlin	**CAT**; **FEA**; 1	CAT; SPR; 18	**RBR**; **FEA**; 1	RBR; SPR; 20	SIL; FEA; 2	SIL; SPR; 6	HOC; FEA; 2	HOC; SPR; 3	HUN; FEA; 4	HUN; SPR; 4	SPA; FEA; 8	SPA; SPR; 1	MNZ; FEA; 6	MNZ; SPR; 2	SOC; FEA; 7	SOC; SPR; 5	YMC; FEA; 5	YMC; SPR; 2	1st	207

=== Complete GP2 Series results ===
(key) (Races in bold indicate pole position) (Races in italics indicate fastest lap)

Year	Entrant	1	2	3	4	5	6	7	8	9	10	11	12	13	14	15	16	17	18	19	20	21	22	DC	Points
2015	DAMS	BHR; FEA; 19	BHR; SPR; 15	CAT; FEA; 5	CAT; SPR; 1	MON; FEA; 13	MON; SPR; 11	RBR; FEA; 3	RBR; SPR; 20	SIL; FEA; 5	SIL; SPR; 6	**HUN**; **FEA**; 1	HUN; SPR; 9	SPA; FEA; 11	SPA; SPR; 8	MNZ; FEA; Ret	MNZ; SPR; 10	**SOC**; **FEA**; Ret	SOC; SPR; 10	BHR; FEA; 8	BHR; SPR; 3	YMC; FEA; 8	YMC; SPR; C	6th	110
2016	DAMS	CAT; FEA; 6	CAT; SPR; 1	MON; FEA; 4	MON; SPR; 5	BAK; FEA; Ret	BAK; SPR; 9	RBR; FEA; 11	RBR; SPR; 3	SIL; FEA; 16	SIL; SPR; 14	HUN; FEA; 12	HUN; SPR; Ret	HOC; FEA; 7	HOC; SPR; 1	SPA; FEA; 3	SPA; SPR; 10	MNZ; FEA; 12	MNZ; SPR; 5	SEP; FEA; 4	SEP; SPR; 12	YMC; FEA; 8	YMC; SPR; 1	6th	124

=== Complete FIA World Endurance Championship results ===
(key) (Races in bold indicate pole position; races in italics indicate fastest lap)

Year	Entrant	Class	Car	Engine	1	2	3	4	5	6	7	8	9	Rank	Points
2016	Manor	LMP2	Oreca 05	Nissan VK45DE 4.5 L V8	SIL	SPA	LMS	NÜR	MEX	COA	FUJ; 11	**SHA**; 9	BHR; 10	30th	4.5
2017	G-Drive Racing	LMP2	Oreca 07	Gibson GK428 4.2 L V8	**SIL**; 5	**SPA**; 1	**LMS**; Ret	NÜR	MEX; 4	COA; 8	FUJ	SHA	BHR	15th	54
2018–19	Aston Martin Racing	LMGTE Pro	Aston Martin Vantage AMR	Aston Martin M177 4.0 L Turbo V8	SPA; 6	LMS; 13	SIL; 4	FUJ; 9	SHA; 4	SEB; 8	SPA; 1	LMS; 14		8th	66
2019–20	Aston Martin Racing	LMGTE Pro	Aston Martin Vantage AMR	Aston Martin M177 4.0 L Turbo V8	SIL; 3	FUJ; 3	SHA; 4	BHR; 3	COA; 4	SPA; 3	LMS; 1	BHR		4th	142
2022	United Autosports USA	LMP2	Oreca 07	Gibson GK428 4.2 L V8	SEB	SPA; 6	LMS; 5	MNZ; 5	FUJ; 5	BHR; 2				7th	75
2023	Cadillac Racing	Hypercar	Cadillac V-LMDh	Cadillac LMC55R 5.5 L V8	SEB; 4	ALG; 4	SPA; 5	LMS; 3	MNZ; 10	FUJ; 10	BHR; 11			5th	72
2024	Cadillac Racing	Hypercar	Cadillac V-Series.R	Cadillac LMC55R 5.5 L V8	QAT; DSQ	IMO; 10	SPA; Ret	LMS; 7	SÃO; 13	COA; 4	**FUJ**; Ret	BHR; 6†		20th	26
2025	Cadillac Hertz Team Jota	Hypercar	Cadillac V-Series.R	Cadillac LMC55R 5.5 L V8	QAT; 8	IMO; 10	SPA; 5	**LMS**; 4	**SÃO**; 1	COA; 8	**FUJ**; 6	BHR; 6		5th	93
2026	Cadillac Hertz Team Jota	Hypercar	Cadillac V-Series.R	Cadillac LMC55R 5.5 L V8	IMO	SPA	LMS	SÃO	COA	FUJ	CAT; 6	MNZ; Ret		22nd	8

^{†} Lynn did not fulfil his mandated minimum drive time, meaning that he did not receive points for that event.

=== Complete IMSA SportsCar Championship results ===
Year	Entrant	No.	Class	Chassis	Engine	1	2	3	4	5	6	7	8	9	10	Rank	Points	Ref
2017	Wayne Taylor Racing	10	P	Cadillac DPi-V.R	Cadillac 6.2 L V8	DAY	SEB; 1	LBH	COA	DET	WGL	MOS	ELK	LGA	PET	29th	35	
2022	Cadillac Racing	02	DPi	Cadillac DPi-V.R	Cadillac 5.5 L V8	DAY; 6	SEB; 1	LBH; 2	LGA; 5	MDO; 4	DET; 3	WGL; 4	MOS; 4	ELK; 2	PET; 5	4th	3191	
2023	Cadillac Racing	02	GTP	Cadillac V-LMDh	Cadillac LMC55R 5. 5 L V8	DAY; 4	SEB	LBH	LGA	WGL	MOS	ELK	IMS	PET		21st	306	
2024	AWA	13	GTD	Chevrolet Corvette Z06 GT3.R	Chevrolet LT6 5.5 L V8	DAY; 21	SEB	LBH	LGA	WGL	MOS	ELK	VIR	IMS	PET	73rd	117	

=== Complete 24 Hours of Le Mans results ===
Year	Team	Co-Drivers	Car	Class	Laps	Pos.	Class Pos.
2017	(Russia) G-Drive Racing	(Russia) Roman Rusinov (France) Pierre Thiriet	Oreca 07-Gibson	LMP2	20	DNF	DNF
2018	(United Kingdom) Aston Martin Racing	(United Kingdom) Jonathan Adam (Belgium) Maxime Martin	Aston Martin Vantage AMR	GTE; Pro	327	37th	13th
2019	(United Kingdom) Aston Martin Racing	(United Kingdom) Jonathan Adam (Belgium) Maxime Martin	Aston Martin Vantage AMR	GTE; Pro	325	44th	12th
2020	(United Kingdom) Aston Martin Racing	(United Kingdom) Harry Tincknell (Belgium) Maxime Martin	Aston Martin Vantage AMR	GTE; Pro	346	20th	**1st**
2021	(United Kingdom) United Autosports	(United Kingdom) Wayne Boyd (United Kingdom) Paul di Resta	Oreca 07-Gibson	LMP2	361	9th	4th
2022	(United States) United Autosports USA	(United Kingdom) Oliver Jarvis (United States) Josh Pierson	Oreca 07-Gibson	LMP2	368	10th	6th
2023	(United States) Cadillac Racing	(New Zealand) Earl Bamber (United Kingdom) Richard Westbrook	Cadillac V-Series.R	Hypercar	341	**3rd**	**3rd**
2024	(United States) Cadillac Racing	(New Zealand) Earl Bamber (Spain) Álex Palou	Cadillac V-Series.R	Hypercar	311	7th	7th
2025	(United States) Cadillac Hertz Team Jota	(France) Norman Nato (United Kingdom) Will Stevens	Cadillac V-Series.R	Hypercar	387	4th	4th

=== Complete Formula E results ===
(key) (Races in bold indicate pole position; races in italics indicate fastest lap)

Year	Team	Chassis	Powertrain	1	2	3	4	5	6	7	8	9	10	11	12	13	14	15	Pos	Points
2016–17	DS Virgin Racing	Spark SRT01-e	DS Virgin DSV-02	HKG	MRK	BUE	MEX	MCO	PAR	BER	BER	**NYC**; Ret	NYC; Ret	MTL	MTL				23rd	3
2017–18	DS Virgin Racing	Spark SRT01-e	DS Virgin DSV-03	HKG; 8	HKG; 9	MRK; 9	SCL; Ret	MEX; 10	PDE; 6	RME; Ret	PAR; 14	BER; 16	ZUR; 16	NYC; Ret	NYC; 14				16th	17
2018–19	Panasonic Jaguar Racing	Spark SRT05e	Jaguar I-Type 3	ADR	MRK	SCL	MEX	HKG	SYX	RME; 12	PAR; Ret	MCO; 8	BER; Ret	BRN; 7	NYC; Ret	NYC; 16			18th	10
2019–20	Mahindra Racing	Spark SRT05e	Mahindra M6Electro	DIR	DIR	SCL	MEX	MRK	BER; 12	BER; 11	BER; 17	BER; 9	BER; 5	BER; 8					17th	16
2020–21	Mahindra Racing	Spark SRT05e	Mahindra M7Electro	DIR; Ret	DIR; Ret	RME; 8	RME; 17	VLC; DSQ	VLC; 3	MCO; 9	PUE; 10	PUE; 6	NYC; 11	NYC; 9	**LDN**; 3	LDN; 1	BER; 20	BER; 13	12th	78

=== Complete European Le Mans Series results ===
(key) (Races in bold indicate pole position; results in italics indicate fastest lap)

Year	Entrant	Class	Chassis	Engine	1	2	3	4	5	6	Rank	Points
2023	Algarve Pro Racing	LMP2	Oreca 07	Gibson GK428 4.2 L V8	CAT; 5	LEC; 1	ARA; 3	**SPA**; 1	**POR**; 2	ALG; 2	1st	113
2024	Algarve Pro Racing	LMP2	Oreca 07	Gibson GK428 4.2 L V8	CAT; 2	LEC; 7	IMO; 8	SPA; 14	MUG; 2	ALG; 8	5th	50
2026	Algarve Pro Racing	LMP2	Oreca 07	Gibson GK428 4.2 L V8	CAT	LEC	IMO	SPA	SIL	ALG; 6	17th	8

Sporting positions
Preceded by Tom Blomqvist	Formula Renault UK; Champion; 2011	Succeeded by None (Series ended)
Preceded by António Félix da Costa	Macau Grand Prix; Winner; 2013	Succeeded by Felix Rosenqvist
Preceded by Daniil Kvyat	GP3 Series; Champion; 2014	Succeeded by Esteban Ocon
Preceded by Louis Delétraz; Ferdinand Habsburg	European Le Mans Series; LMP2 Champion; 2023; With: Kyffin Simpson & James Allen	Succeeded by Louis Delétraz; Robert Kubica; Jonny Edgar
Awards and achievements
Preceded by Tom Blomqvist	Autosport Awards; British Club Driver of the Year; 2011	Succeeded by Scott Malvern
