= Rodda =

Rodda is an English and Cornish surname. It can be either a variant of Roda or Rhoda, or a West Cornwall variant of Rodd.

Notable people with the surname include:

- Adrian G. Rodda (1911–1997), New Zealand civil servant
- Albert S. Rodda (1912–2010), California State Senator
- Alby Rodda (1920–2002), Australian rules footballer
- Christine Rodda (born 1955), Australian paediatric endocrinologist and academic
- Emily Rodda (born 1948), pen name of Australian author Jennifer Rowe
- Kabrena Rodda, American chemist
- Leonard Rodda (1892–1970), Australian politician
- Matt Rodda (born 1966), British politician

== Other ==
- A. E. Rodda & Son, Cornish clotted cream makers
- Rodda Paint, a paint company in the US
- Rodda company arms heist, 1914 heist in Calcutta by Indian nationalists against the British
