= List of Formula 3 Euro Series drivers =

This is a list of Formula 3 Euro Series drivers, that is, a list of drivers who have made at least one race start in the Formula 3 Euro Series. Drivers of Trophy that held in 2006 are not included. This list is accurate up to the end of the 2012 season.

== By name ==
Key
Symbol	Meaning
~	Driver competed in the last Formula One race (the 2026 Japanese Grand Prix)
^	Driver has competed in Formula One but not the last race

Name	License	Seasons	Championship titles	Races (Starts)	Poles (Note: Reverse-grid pole positions not included.)	Wins	Podiums	Fastest Laps	Points
Simon Abadie	France	2003	0	20	0	0	0	0	19
Átila Abreu	Brazil	2005	0	20	0	0	0	0	12
Daniel Abt	Germany	2011	0	27	0	0	3	1	150
Sergey Afanasyev	Russia	2007	0	20 (18)	0	0	0	0	0
Cyndie Allemann	Switzerland	2007	0	20	0	0	0	0	0
Richard Antinucci	United States	2005–2006	0	28 (26)	0	2	5	0	41
Lucas Auer	Austria	2012	0	3	0	0	0	0	0
Bernhard Auinger	Austria	2003	0	20	0	0	0	0	15
Rob Austin	United Kingdom	2005	0	4	0	0	0	0	0
Philipp Baron	Austria	2003–2004	0	40 (38)	0	0	0	0	0
Jules Bianchi^	France	2008–2009	1 (2009)	40	8	11	19	9	161
Sam Bird	United Kingdom	2008–2009	0	38	1	0	6	2	63
Emil Bernstorff	United Kingdom	2012	0	24	0	0	1	0	91
Tom Blomqvist	United Kingdom	2012	0	24	0	0	2	0	157.5
Marco Bonanomi	Italy	2004–2005	0	40 (39)	0	0	1	0	21
Mirko Bortolotti	Italy	2009	0	2	0	0	1	0	0
Valtteri Bottas~	Finland	2009–2010	0	38	3	2	14	5	136
Niall Breen	Ireland	2008	0	16	0	0	1	0	8
Ryan Briscoe	Australia	2003	1 (2003)	20	4	8	10	5	110
Récardo Bruins Choi	South Korea	2006	0	2	0	0	0	0	0
Sébastien Buemi^	Switzerland	2006–2007	0	40	2	4	14	10	126
William Buller	United Kingdom	2012	0	24	1	2	7	1	182.5
Yelmer Buurman	Netherlands	2006–2007	0	24	0	0	3	0	41
Andrea Caldarelli	Italy	2009	0	20	0	0	1	1	11
César Campaniço	Portugal	2003	0	16	0	0	0	0	13
Daniel Campos-Hull	Spain	2008	0	20	0	0	0	0	0
Ruben Carrapatoso	Brazil	2004	0	8	0	0	0	0	0
Fabio Carbone	Brazil	2003, 2005	0	40	0	1	4	0	70
Adam Carroll	United Kingdom	2003	0	8	0	0	0	0	7
Johnny Cecotto Jr.	Venezuela	2009	0	12	0	0	0	0	0
Matteo Chinosi	Italy	2009	0	8	0	0	0	0	0
Yann Clairay	France	2007–2008	0	40	0	0	3	2	46
Dani Clos	Spain	2007–2008	0	40	0	0	2	1	29.5
Ben Clucas	United Kingdom	2005	0	2	0	0	0	0	0
Stefano Coletti	Monaco	2008–2009	0	36 (35)	0	1	2	2	25.5
Cheng Congfu	China	2008	0	16	0	0	0	0	0
Alon Day	Israel	2011	0	6	0	0	0	0	0
Pipo Derani	Brazil	2012	0	6	0	0	0	0	0
Michael Devaney	Ireland	2007	0	2	0	0	0	0	0
Lucas di Grassi^	Brazil	2003, 2005	0	24 (23)	2	1	6	1	73
Paul di Resta^	United Kingdom	2005–2006	1 (2006)	40	8	5	10	3	118
Tom Dillmann	France	2007–2009, 2011	0	42 (40)	0	0	5	0	31
Robert Doornbos^	Netherlands	2003	0	20	0	0	3	0	40
Loïc Duval	France	2004–2005	0	40 (39)	0	0	7	0	74
Philip Ellis	United Kingdom	2012	0	9	0	0	0	0	0
Peter Elkmann	Germany	2004, 2006, 2008	0	28	0	1	2	1	14
Maro Engel	Germany	2003	0	8	0	0	0	0	0
Pedro Enrique	Brazil	2009	0	20	0	0	0	0	0
Jimmy Eriksson	Sweden	2010	0	29	0	0	0	0	93
Pietro Fantin	Brazil	2012	0	3	0	0	0	0	0
António Félix da Costa	Portugal	2010	0	18	0	3	4	1	40
Gregory Franchi	Belgium	2004–2005	0	38 (37)	0	0	0	0	11
Dennis Furchheim	Germany	2004	0	4	0	0	0	0	5
Natacha Gachnang	Switzerland	2006	0	8 (7)	0	0	0	0	0
Víctor García	Spain	2009	0	2	0	0	0	0	0
Tiago Geronimi	Brazil	2009	0	20 (19)	0	0	0	0	2
Kuba Giermaziak	Poland	2011	0	18	0	0	0	0	27
Timo Glock^	Germany	2003	0	20	0	3	6	1	55
Spike Goddard	Australia	2012	0	6	0	0	0	0	0
Maximilian Götz	Germany	2004–2005, 2007–2008	0	46	0	0	1	0	19
Rodolfo González	Venezuela	2008	0	18	0	0	0	1	0.5
Jamie Green	United Kingdom	2003–2004	1 (2004)	28	5	7	15	8	145
Romain Grosjean^	France	2006–2007	1 (2007)	40	4	6	13	7	125
Esteban Guerrieri	Argentina	2005–2007	0	42 (41)	2	2	6	1	70
Esteban Gutiérrez^	Mexico	2009–2010	0	22	0	0	2	0	26
Lewis Hamilton~	United Kingdom	2004–2005	1 (2005)	40	14	16	22	12	240
Euan Hankey	United Kingdom	2007	0	10	0	0	0	0	0
Brendon Hartley^	New Zealand	2008–2009	0	24	0	1	1	0	15
Jack Harvey	United Kingdom	2012	0	3	0	0	0	0	0
Derek Hayes	United Kingdom	2004	0	2	0	0	0	0	0
Tobias Hegewald	Germany	2010	0	2	0	0	0	0	1
Michael Herck	Monaco	2006–2007	0	22 (21)	0	0	1	0	12
Jan Heylen	Belgium	2003	0	14 (13)	0	0	0	0	0
Katsuyuki Hiranaka	Japan	2003–2004	0	40	0	0	1	1	13
Kohei Hirate	Japan	2004–2006	0	44 (43)	0	1	6	3	79
Marco Holzer	Germany	2007	0	20	0	0	0	0	0
Thomas Holzer	Germany	2005	0	20	0	0	0	0	0
Carlos Huertas	Colombia	2011	0	3	0	0	0	0	0
Nico Hülkenberg~	Germany	2007–2008	1 (2008)	40	8	11	16	10	157
Fahmi Ilyas	Malaysia	2012	0	6	0	0	0	0	0
Jazeman Jaafar	Malaysia	2011–2012	0	15	0	1	0	3	0
James Jakes	United Kingdom	2006–2008	0	44	2	2	4	2	68
Erik Janiš	Czech Republic	2008	0	20	0	0	0	0	5
Stephen Jelley	United Kingdom	2005	0	2	0	0	0	0	0
Johan Jokinen	Denmark	2009	0	18 (17)	0	0	0	0	0
Daniel Juncadella	Spain	2010–2012	1 (2012)	69	10	10	27	13	555
Robert Kath	Germany	2004	0	12	0	0	0	0	0
Charlie Kimball	United States	2006, 2008	0	26	0	1	4	0	39
Tom Kimber-Smith	United Kingdom	2004	0	20	0	0	0	0	2
Michael Klein	Germany	2008	0	8	0	0	0	0	2
Christian Klien^	Austria	2003	0	20	6	3	8	3	89
Jens Klingmann	Germany	2008	0	20	0	0	0	0	0
Kamui Kobayashi^	Japan	2006–2007	0	40 (39)	1	1	10	1	93
Robert Kubica^	Poland	2003–2004	0	34	0	1	5	2	84
Julia Kuhn	Germany	2005–2006	0	12 (8)	0	0	0	0	0
Matias Laine	Finland	2010	0	18	0	0	0	0	3
Jon Lancaster	United Kingdom	2008	0	20 (19)	0	1	2	0	19
Nicolas Lapierre	France	2003–2004	0	40	3	3	8	2	118
Daniel la Rosa	Germany	2003–2004	0	40 (38)	0	0	1	0	16
Marcel Lasée	Germany	2003	0	8	0	0	0	0	3
Michael Lewis	United States	2012	0	24	0	1	4	1	127.5
Richard Lietz	Austria	2003	0	20	0	0	0	0	7
Alex Lynn	United Kingdom	2012	0	9	0	0	1	0	0
Kevin Magnussen^	Denmark	2010	0	2	0	1	1	1	8
James Manderson	Australia	2003	0	8	0	0	0	0	0
Franck Mailleux	France	2007–2008	0	40	0	2	5	4	65
Mika Mäki	Finland	2008–2010	0	46	0	3	9	3	89
Raffaele Marciello	Italy	2012	0	24	2	6	10	6	219.5
Alexandros Margaritis	Greece	2003–2004	0	40 (39)	2	0	1	0	41
Artem Markelov	Russia	2011	0	3	0	0	0	0	0
Nicolas Marroc	France	2010	0	18	0	0	2	0	10
Alexandre Marsoin	France	2009	0	4	0	0	0	0	0
Nick McBride	Australia	2012	0	3	0	0	0	0	0
Nigel Melker	Netherlands	2011	0	24	2	4	9	2	251
Roberto Merhi^	Spain	2009–2011	1 (2011)	65	8	12	27	10	504
Kevin Mirocha	Germany	2009	0	8 (6)	0	0	0	0	0
Nico Monien	Germany	2009	0	2	0	0	0	0	0
Christian Montanari	San Marino	2004	0	4	0	0	0	0	0
Paolo Montin	Italy	2005	0	2	0	0	0	0	0
Guillaume Moreau	France	2005–2006	0	40	0	1	5	0	79
Edoardo Mortara	Italy	2007–2010	1 (2010)	60	5	10	21	7	187.5
Dominick Muermans	Netherlands	2006	0	2	0	0	0	0	0
Sven Müller	Germany	2012	0	24	1	1	6	1	172
Carlos Muñoz	Colombia	2010–2011	0	45	0	0	3	0	123
Atte Mustonen	Finland	2009	0	12	0	0	0	0	4
Kazuki Nakajima^	Japan	2006	0	20 (19)	0	1	4	2	36
Felipe Nasr^	Brazil	2012	0	3 (2)	0	0	0	0	0
Hannes Neuhauser	Austria	2004–2005	0	40	0	0	0	0	9
Paolo Maria Nocera	Italy	2006	0	8	0	0	0	0	0
Alejandro Núñez	Spain	2004–2006	0	50	0	0	0	0	1
Oliver Oakes	United Kingdom	2008	0	2	0	0	0	0	0
Ronayne O'Mahony	Ireland	2006	0	20	0	0	0	0	0
Kazuya Oshima	Japan	2008	0	20	0	1	1	0	7
Duvashen Padayachee	Australia	2012	0	3	0	0	0	0	0
Nelson Panciatici	France	2008	0	2	0	0	0	0	0
Álvaro Parente	Portugal	2003	0	20 (19)	0	0	0	0	1
Michael Patrizi	Australia	2007	0	20	0	0	0	0	1
Franck Perera	France	2004–2005	0	40	0	0	7	0	115
Richard Philippe	France	2008	0	20	0	0	0	0	0
Edoardo Piscopo	Italy	2007	0	20	0	0	1	0	8
Jim Pla	France	2010	0	18 (17)	0	1	1	0	13
Olivier Pla	France	2003	0	20	3	0	8	0	74
Martin Plowman	United Kingdom	2008	0	14	0	0	0	0	0
Stefano Proetto	Italy	2003	0	16	0	0	0	0	0
Alexandre Prémat	France	2003–2004	0	40	7	4	11	5	138
Harold Primat	Switzerland	2003	0	20	0	0	0	0	0
Adrian Quaife-Hobbs	United Kingdom	2010	0	4	0	0	0	0	7
Gianmarco Raimondo	Canada	2011	0	27	0	0	1	0	66
César Ramos	Brazil	2009	0	16	0	0	0	0	0
Fernando Rees	Brazil	2004	0	2	0	0	0	0	0
Facu Regalia	Argentina	2011	0	3	0	0	0	0	0
Daniel Ricciardo^	Australia	2008	0	2	0	0	0	0	0
Stéphane Richelmi	Monaco	2008	0	6	0	0	0	0	0
Andrea Roda	Italy	2012	0	24	0	0	0	0	15
Nico Rosberg^	Germany	2003–2004	0	40 (39)	3	4	10	3	114
Felix Rosenqvist	Sweden	2011–2012	0	51	3	5	8	8	431.5
Jake Rosenzweig	United States	2009	0	20	0	0	1	0	6
James Rossiter	United Kingdom	2005	0	20	0	1	3	0	51
Filip Salaquarda	Czech Republic	2005–2007	0	60	0	0	0	0	3
Eric Salignon	France	2004	0	16	3	3	5	3	64
Tim Sandtler	Germany	2006–2007, 2009	0	44	0	0	0	0	9
Luís Sá Silva	Angola	2010, 2012	0	23 (20)	0	0	0	0	14
Carlos Sainz Jr.~	Spain	2011–2012	0	27	2	0	2	2	112
Kimiya Sato	Japan	2011	0	27	0	1	2	0	86
Harald Schlegelmilch	Latvia	2007	0	20	0	1	1	0	9
Félix Serrallés	Puerto Rico	2012	0	9	0	0	2	1	0
Basil Shaaban	Lebanon	2007–2009	0	60	0	0	1	0	6
Alexander Sims	United Kingdom	2009–2010	0	41	1	3	11	3	117
Marco Sørensen	Denmark	2011	0	3	0	1	1	1	0
Bruno Spengler	Canada	2003–2004	0	34	0	0	4	1	61
Roberto Streit	Brazil	2004, 2006	0	22	0	0	1	0	32
Jonathan Summerton	United States	2006–2007	0	26	0	1	3	0	32
Adrian Sutil^	Germany	2004–2005	0	38	3	2	11	3	103
Adrien Tambay	France	2009	0	16	0	0	0	0	0
Nick Tandy	United Kingdom	2009	0	12 (11)	0	0	0	0	0
Harry Tincknell	United Kingdom	2012	0	6	0	1	1	1	0
Gilles Tinguely	Switzerland	2003	0	6 (5)	0	0	0	0	0
Claudio Torre	Italy	2003	0	8	0	0	0	0	0
Koudai Tsukakoshi	Japan	2008	0	20	0	0	4	0	36
Geoff Uhrhane	Australia	2012	0	6	0	0	0	0	0
João Urbano	Portugal	2006	0	10	0	0	0	0	1
Hannes van Asseldonk	Netherlands	2012	0	6	0	0	1	1	0
Carlo van Dam	Netherlands	2007, 2009	0	8	0	0	0	0	0
Dennis van de Laar	Netherlands	2012	0	3	0	0	0	0	0
Giedo van der Garde^	Netherlands	2004–2006	0	60 (59)	3	1	8	1	108
Renger van der Zande	Netherlands	2007–2010	0	50	0	4	8	0	74
Laurens Vanthoor	Belgium	2010–2011	0	45	1	0	9	0	231
Nico Verdonck	Belgium	2005	0	4	0	0	0	0	0
Jean Karl Vernay	France	2007–2009	0	60	0	2	9	2	105
Frédéric Vervisch	Belgium	2008	0	2	0	0	0	0	0
Sebastian Vettel^	Germany	2005–2006	0	40	1	4	15	6	138
Hendrik Vieth	Germany	2003	0	2	0	0	0	0	0
Christian Vietoris	Germany	2008–2009	0	38 (37)	1	5	12	3	111
Toni Vilander	Finland	2004	0	4	0	0	0	0	0
Henkie Waldschmidt	Netherlands	2008–2009	0	40 (39)	0	0	0	1	13
James Walker	United Kingdom	2006	0	4	0	0	0	0	0
Danny Watts	United Kingdom	2005	0	2	0	0	0	0	0
Pascal Wehrlein^	Germany	2012	0	24	1	1	10	1	226
Robert Wickens	Canada	2008–2009	0	18	0	1	2	0	10.5
Markus Winkelhock^	Germany	2003	0	20	1	2	5	3	71
Marco Wittmann	Germany	2009–2011	0	65	5	1	10	7	367
Lucas Wolf	Germany	2012	0	24	0	0	1	0	36
Sakon Yamamoto^	Japan	2003	0	20	0	0	0	0	0
Christopher Zanella	Switzerland	2009–2010	0	28 (26)	0	0	1	0	13
Sandro Zeller	Switzerland	2010–2012	0	37	0	0	0	0	23
Andreas Zuber	Austria	2003–2004	0	40 (39)	0	0	0	0	2
Charles Zwolsman Jr.	Netherlands	2003–2004	0	40	0	0	1	0	16
Ross Zwolsman	Netherlands	2004–2005	0	10	0	0	0	0	2

== By license ==
License	Total Drivers	Champions	Championships	Nation's Cup	First driver(s)	Last driver(s)
Angola	1	0	0	0	Luís Sá Silva (2010)	Luís Sá Silva (2012)
Argentina	2	0	0	0	Esteban Guerrieri (2005)	Facu Regalia (2011)
Australia	8	1 (Briscoe)	1 (2003)	0	Ryan Briscoe, James Manderson (2003)	Spike Goddard, Nick McBride, Duvashen Padayachee, Geoff Uhrhane (2012)
Austria	7	0	0	0	Bernhard Auinger, Philipp Baron, Christian Klien, Richard Lietz, Andreas Zuber (2003)	Lucas Auer (2012)
Belgium	5	0	0	0	Jan Heylen (2003)	Laurens Vanthoor (2011)
Brazil	12	0	0	0	Fabio Carbone, Lucas di Grassi (2003)	Pipo Derani, Pietro Fantin, Felipe Nasr (2012)
Canada	3	0	0	0	Bruno Spengler (2003)	Gianmarco Raimondo (2011)
China	1	0	0	0	Cheng Congfu (2008)	Cheng Congfu (2008)
Colombia	2	0	0	0	Carlos Muñoz (2010)	Carlos Huertas, Carlos Muñoz (2011)
Czech Republic	2	0	0	0	Filip Salaquarda (2005)	Erik Janiš (2008)
Denmark	3	0	0	0	Johan Jokinen (2009)	Marco Sørensen (2011)
Finland	5	0	0	0	Toni Vilander (2004)	Valtteri Bottas, Matias Laine, Mika Mäki (2010)
France	20	2 (Bianchi, Grosjean)	2 (2007, 2009)	5 (2003–04, 2007–09)	Simon Abadie, Nicolas Lapierre, Olivier Pla, Alexandre Prémat (2003)	Tom Dillmann (2011)
Germany	29	1 (Hülkenberg)	1 (2008)	0	Maro Engel, Timo Glock, Daniel la Rosa, Marcel Lasée, Nico Rosberg, Markus Winkelhock (2003)	Sven Müller, Pascal Wehrlein, Lucas Wolf (2012)
Greece	1	0	0	0	Alexandros Margaritis (2003)	Alexandros Margaritis (2004)
Ireland	3	0	0	0	Ronayne O'Mahony (2006)	Niall Breen (2008)
Israel	1	0	0	0	Alon Day (2011)	Alon Day (2011)
Italy	12	1 (Mortara)	1 (2010)	1 (2010)	Stefano Proetto, Claudio Torre (2003)	Raffaele Marciello, Andrea Roda (2012)
Japan	8	0	0	1 (2006)	Katsuyuki Hiranaka, Sakon Yamamoto (2003)	Kimiya Sato (2011)
Latvia	1	0	0	0	Harald Schlegelmilch (2007)	Harald Schlegelmilch (2007)
Lebanon	1	0	0	0	Basil Shaaban (2007)	Basil Shaaban (2009)
Malaysia	2	0	0	0	Jazeman Jaafar (2011)	Fahmi Ilyas, Jazeman Jaafar (2012)
Mexico	1	0	0	0	Esteban Gutiérrez (2009)	Esteban Gutiérrez (2010)
Monaco	3	0	0	0	Michael Herck (2006)	Stefano Coletti (2009)
Netherlands	12	0	0	0	Robert Doornbos, Charles Zwolsman Jr. (2003)	Hannes van Asseldonk, Dennis van de Laar (2012)
New Zealand	1	0	0	0	Brendon Hartley (2008)	Brendon Hartley (2009)
Poland	2	0	0	0	Robert Kubica (2003)	Kuba Giermaziak (201)
Portugal	4	0	0	0	César Campaniço, Álvaro Parente (2003)	António Félix da Costa (2010)
Puerto Rico	1	0	0	0	Félix Serrallés (2012)	Félix Serrallés (2012)
Russia	2	0	0	0	Sergey Afanasyev (2007)	Artem Markelov (2011)
San Marino	1	0	0	0	Christian Montanari (2004)	Christian Montanari (2004)
South Korea	1	0	0	0	Récardo Bruins Choi (2006)	Récardo Bruins Choi (2006)
Spain	7	2 (Merhi, Daniel Juncadella)	2 (2011, 2012)	2 (2011, 2012)	Alejandro Núñez (2004)	Daniel Juncadella, Carlos Sainz Jr. (2012)
Sweden	2	0	0	0	Jimmy Eriksson (2010)	Felix Rosenqvist (2012)
Switzerland	7	0	0	0	Harold Primat, Gilles Tinguely (2003)	Sandro Zeller (2012)
United Kingdom	28	3 (Green, Hamilton, di Resta)	3 (2004, 2005, 2006)	1 (2004)	Adam Carroll, Jamie Green (2003)	Emil Bernstorff, Tom Blomqvist, William Buller, Philip Ellis, Jack Harvey, Alex Lynn, Alexander Sims (2012)
United States	5	0	0	0	Richard Antinucci (2005)	Michael Lewis (2012)
Venezuela	2	0	0	0	Rodolfo González (2008)	Johnny Cecotto Jr. (2009)
