= Roda (name) =

Roda may refer to the following people

Given name

- Roda Antar (born 1980), Sierra Leone-born Lebanese professional footballer
- Roda Ali Wais (born 1984), Djiboutian middle-distance runner

Surname

- Alexander Roda Roda (1872–1945), Austrian writer
- Andrea Roda (born 1990), Italian Formula 3 and Formula Renault 3.5 car racing driver
- Andy Roda, Danish-Filipino singer, songwriter, arranger, producer, instrumentalist, visual artist and occasional actor
- Davide Roda (born 1972), Italian auto racing driver
- Federico Martínez Roda (born 1950), Spanish professor of history at the Valencia Catholic University
- Manuel de Roda (1706–1782), Spanish statesman
- Maria Roda (1877–1958), Italian American anarchist-feminist activist, speaker and writer
- Raymond of Roda (died 1095), Spanish bishop of Roda from 1076 until his death
- Stéphane Roda (born 1973), French footballer
