= 2012 Formula 3 Euro Series =

The 2012 Formula 3 Euro Series season was the tenth and final championship year of the Formula 3 Euro Series.

== Drivers and teams ==
Competition numbers 30 and higher are single-race entrants and are ineligible to score championship points.

Team	No.	Driver	Rookie	Chassis (Note: All drivers competed in Dallara chassis; model listed.)	Engine	Rounds
(Italy) Prema Powerteam	1	(Spain) Daniel Juncadella		F312/005	Mercedes-Benz	All
(Italy) Prema Powerteam	2	(Germany) Sven Müller	R	F312/014	Mercedes-Benz	All
(Italy) Prema Powerteam	14	(United States) Michael Lewis		F312/015	Mercedes-Benz	All
(Italy) Prema Powerteam	15	(Italy) Raffaele Marciello		F312/030	Mercedes-Benz	All
(Germany) Mücke Motorsport	5	(Sweden) Felix Rosenqvist		F312/020	Mercedes-Benz	All
(Germany) Mücke Motorsport	6	(Germany) Pascal Wehrlein	R	F312/023	Mercedes-Benz	All
(Switzerland) Jo Zeller Racing	7	(Switzerland) Sandro Zeller		F308/044	Mercedes-Benz	All
(Switzerland) Jo Zeller Racing	8	(Italy) Andrea Roda		F312/044	Mercedes-Benz	All
(Germany) URD Rennsport	9	(Germany) Lucas Wolf	R	F312/011	Mercedes-Benz	All
(Germany) GU-Racing	10	(United Kingdom) Philip Ellis	R	F312/019	Mercedes-Benz	1, 3–4
(United Kingdom) Carlin	11	(United Kingdom) William Buller		F312/040	Volkswagen	All
(United Kingdom) Carlin	12	(Spain) Carlos Sainz Jr.		F312/004	Volkswagen	All
(United Kingdom) Carlin	30	(United Kingdom) Harry Tincknell		F312/010	Volkswagen	2, 4
(United Kingdom) Carlin	34	(Malaysia) Jazeman Jaafar		F312/002	Volkswagen	2–5
(United Kingdom) Carlin	39	(United Kingdom) Jack Harvey		F312/001	Volkswagen	4
(United Kingdom) Carlin	40	(Brazil) Pietro Fantin		F312/016	Volkswagen	4
(United Kingdom) Carlin	44	(Brazil) Felipe Nasr		F312/016	Volkswagen	8
(Germany) ma-con Motorsport	16	(United Kingdom) Tom Blomqvist		F312/045	Volkswagen	All
(Germany) ma-con Motorsport	17	(United Kingdom) Emil Bernstorff	R	F312/046	Volkswagen	All
(Portugal) Angola Racing Team	23	(Angola) Luís Sá Silva		F312/039	Mercedes-Benz	All
(United Kingdom) Fortec Motorsports	31	(Netherlands) Hannes van Asseldonk		F312/035	Mercedes-Benz	1, 4
(United Kingdom) Fortec Motorsports	32	(Puerto Rico) Félix Serrallés		F312/007	Mercedes-Benz	1, 4, 8
(United Kingdom) Fortec Motorsports	33	(United Kingdom) Alex Lynn		F312/036	Mercedes-Benz	1, 4, 8
(United Kingdom) Fortec Motorsports	38	(Brazil) Pipo Derani		F312/003	Mercedes-Benz	4, 8
(Finland) Double R Racing	35	(Australia) Geoff Uhrhane		F312/043	Mercedes-Benz	2, 4
(Finland) Double R Racing	36	(Malaysia) Fahmi Ilyas		F312/009	Mercedes-Benz	2, 4
(Finland) Double R Racing	37	(Australia) Duvashen Padayachee		F308/054	Mugen-Honda	4
(Finland) ThreeBond with T-Sport	41	(Australia) Nick McBride		F312/008	ThreeBond Nissan	4
(Finland) ThreeBond with T-Sport	42	(Australia) Richard Goddard		F308/025	Mugen-Honda	4–5
(Finland) ThreeBond with T-Sport	43	(United Kingdom) Alexander Sims		F312/008	ThreeBond Nissan	5
(Netherlands) Van Amersfoort Racing	50	(Austria) Lucas Auer		F312/051	Volkswagen	8
(Netherlands) Van Amersfoort Racing	51	(Netherlands) Dennis van de Laar		F312/052	Volkswagen	8

Icon	Legend
R	Rookie Cup

== Race calendar and results ==
- A provisional nine-round calendar was announced on 25 November 2011. On 2 April 2012, the calendar was reduced to eight events as series organisers decided to change the meeting due to be held at Lausitzring to Brands Hatch and drop another event, at Oschersleben. All eight rounds will be part of the revived ten-round FIA European Formula 3 Championship, and will also support Deutsche Tourenwagen Masters events.

Round		Circuit	Date	Pole position	Fastest lap	Winning driver	Winning team
1	R1	(Germany) Hockenheimring	28 April	(Spain) Carlos Sainz Jr.	(Spain) Daniel Juncadella	(Spain) Daniel Juncadella	(Italy) Prema Powerteam
1	R2	(Germany) Hockenheimring	28 April		(Italy) Raffaele Marciello	(Italy) Raffaele Marciello	(Italy) Prema Powerteam
1	R3	(Germany) Hockenheimring	29 April	(Spain) Carlos Sainz Jr.	(Spain) Carlos Sainz Jr.	(Spain) Daniel Juncadella	(Italy) Prema Powerteam
2	R1	(United Kingdom) Brands Hatch	19 May	(Spain) Daniel Juncadella	(Italy) Raffaele Marciello	(Italy) Raffaele Marciello	(Italy) Prema Powerteam
2	R2	(United Kingdom) Brands Hatch	19 May		(Germany) Sven Müller	(Malaysia) Jazeman Jaafar	(United Kingdom) Carlin
2	R3	(United Kingdom) Brands Hatch	20 May	(Spain) Daniel Juncadella	(Italy) Raffaele Marciello	(Italy) Raffaele Marciello	(Italy) Prema Powerteam
3	R1	(Austria) Red Bull Ring, Spielberg	2 June	(United Kingdom) William Buller	(Italy) Raffaele Marciello	(Italy) Raffaele Marciello	(Italy) Prema Powerteam
3	R2	(Austria) Red Bull Ring, Spielberg	2 June		(Italy) Raffaele Marciello	(United Kingdom) William Buller	(United Kingdom) Carlin
3	R3	(Austria) Red Bull Ring, Spielberg	3 June	(Sweden) Felix Rosenqvist	(Spain) Daniel Juncadella	(Spain) Daniel Juncadella	(Italy) Prema Powerteam
4	R1	(Germany) Norisring, Nuremberg	30 June	(Italy) Raffaele Marciello	(Italy) Raffaele Marciello	No winner (Note: Daniel Juncadella was disqualified from the first Norisring race after collisions with Pascal Wehrlein and Raffaele Marciello. As drivers were not promoted in the race results, no driver was officially recognised as having finished in first place.)	
4	R2	(Germany) Norisring, Nuremberg	30 June		(United Kingdom) William Buller	(United Kingdom) Harry Tincknell	(United Kingdom) Carlin
4	R3	(Germany) Norisring, Nuremberg	1 July	(Germany) Pascal Wehrlein	(Netherlands) Hannes van Asseldonk	(Italy) Raffaele Marciello	(Italy) Prema Powerteam
5	R1	(Germany) Nürburgring	18 August	(Spain) Daniel Juncadella	(Spain) Daniel Juncadella	(Spain) Daniel Juncadella	(Italy) Prema Powerteam
5	R2	(Germany) Nürburgring	18 August		(United Kingdom) Alexander Sims	(United Kingdom) Alexander Sims	(Finland) ThreeBond with T-Sport
5	R3	(Germany) Nürburgring	19 August	(Spain) Daniel Juncadella	(United Kingdom) Alexander Sims	(Germany) Pascal Wehrlein	(Germany) Mücke Motorsport
6	R1	(Netherlands) Circuit Park Zandvoort	25 August	(Germany) Sven Müller	(Sweden) Felix Rosenqvist	(Sweden) Felix Rosenqvist	(Germany) Mücke Motorsport
6	R2	(Netherlands) Circuit Park Zandvoort	25 August		(Spain) Daniel Juncadella	(United Kingdom) William Buller	(United Kingdom) Carlin
6	R3	(Netherlands) Circuit Park Zandvoort	26 August	(Germany) Sven Müller	(Spain) Daniel Juncadella	(Spain) Daniel Juncadella	(Italy) Prema Powerteam
7	R1	(Spain) Circuit Ricardo Tormo, Valencia	29 September	(Italy) Raffaele Marciello	(Spain) Daniel Juncadella	(Italy) Raffaele Marciello	(Italy) Prema Powerteam
7	R2	(Spain) Circuit Ricardo Tormo, Valencia	29 September		(United States) Michael Lewis	(United States) Michael Lewis	(Italy) Prema Powerteam
7	R3	(Spain) Circuit Ricardo Tormo, Valencia	30 September	(Spain) Daniel Juncadella	(Sweden) Felix Rosenqvist	(Sweden) Felix Rosenqvist	(Germany) Mücke Motorsport
8	R1	(Germany) Hockenheimring	20 October	(Sweden) Felix Rosenqvist	(Sweden) Felix Rosenqvist	(Sweden) Felix Rosenqvist	(Germany) Mücke Motorsport
8	R2	(Germany) Hockenheimring	20 October		(Puerto Rico) Félix Serrallés	(Germany) Sven Müller	(Italy) Prema Powerteam
8	R3	(Germany) Hockenheimring	21 October	(Sweden) Felix Rosenqvist	(Germany) Pascal Wehrlein	(Sweden) Felix Rosenqvist	(Germany) Mücke Motorsport

== Championship standings ==
The third race at the Norisring was red-flagged after half the race had been completed due to torrential rain. As a result, series organisers only awarded half points to each of the classified finishers eligible to score points. Similarly, half-points were awarded in the second race at Zandvoort, as only five laps were completed within the allotted time limit for racing.

=== Drivers' Championship ===
Pos	Driver	HOC (Germany)			BRH (United Kingdom)			RBR (Austria)			NOR (Germany)			NÜR (Germany)			ZAN (Netherlands)			VAL (Spain)			HOC (Germany)			Pts
1	(Spain) Daniel Juncadella	1	Ret	1	**2**	12	**8**	7	8	1	DSQ	11	2	**1**	8	**DSQ**	6	2	1	2	7	**2**	13	Ret	4	240
2	(Germany) Pascal Wehrlein	Ret	9	8	5	3	5	2	6	4	7	3	**Ret**	3	4	1	7	3	3	5	3	4	2	8	2	229
3	(Italy) Raffaele Marciello	6	1	17	1	7	1	1	9	8	**22**†	17	1	6	2	Ret	4	13	Ret	**1**	Ret	3	3	2	8	219.5
4	(Sweden) Felix Rosenqvist	3	3	3	7	5	Ret	9	Ret	**11**	6	4	14	4	3	Ret	1	6	4	13	8	1	**1**	9	**1**	212.5
5	(United Kingdom) William Buller	4	4	6	15	10	2	**8**	1	2	2	5	18	10	10	2	8	1	2	6	5	9	6	5	Ret	182.5
6	(Germany) Sven Müller	15	6	5	6	2	10	4	4	3	9	Ret	11	2	5	Ret	**2**	5	**Ret**	7	2	13	5	1	6	172
7	(United Kingdom) Tom Blomqvist	7	11	11	10	9	7	5	3	7	10	6	7	9	6	5	5	4	Ret	3	4	5	4	6	7	157.5
8	(United States) Michael Lewis	9	10	Ret	3	4	3	6	2	6	Ret	13	8	15	9	6	3	Ret	Ret	8	1	8	9	14	10	127
9	(Spain) Carlos Sainz Jr.	**2**	5	**2**	4	6	4	16†	7	5	Ret	25†	19	7	15	10	11	9	5	Ret	10	6	Ret	13	11	112
10	(United Kingdom) Emil Bernstorff	11	12	12	11	11	9	11	10	14	3	Ret	4	11	11	4	9	8	6	4	6	7	11	11	9	91
11	(Germany) Lucas Wolf	8	7	15	Ret	16	13	13	14	12	Ret	20	22	12	13	8	10	7	7	11	12	12	8	3	15	36
12	(Switzerland) Sandro Zeller	12	15	10	13	17	14	15	12	9	11	12	23	16	16	9	12	10	9	12	13	11	15	16	14	23
13	(Italy) Andrea Roda	Ret	16	14	14	15	11	10	11	Ret	16	19	13	13	14	Ret	13	11	8	9	9	10	12	18	13	15
14	(Angola) Luís Sá Silva	13	14	13	DNS	DNS	DNS	12	13	Ret	15	18	16	14	12	7	14†	12	Ret	10	11	14	Ret	17	12	14
15	(United Kingdom) Philip Ellis	14	17†	16				14	15	13	Ret	21	Ret													0
Guest drivers ineligible for points
	(Malaysia) Jazeman Jaafar				8	1	Ret	3	5	10	18	14	Ret	5	7	3										0
	(United Kingdom) Harry Tincknell				Ret	13	6				8	1	10													0
	(United Kingdom) Alexander Sims													8	1	12										0
	(Puerto Rico) Félix Serrallés	Ret	13	9							5	2	3										16†	19	5	0
	(Netherlands) Hannes van Asseldonk	5	2	7							20	10	5													0
	(United Kingdom) Alex Lynn	10	8	4							19	9	9										Ret	12	3	0
	(Brazil) Pietro Fantin										4	8	6													0
	(Austria) Lucas Auer																						7	4	Ret	0
	(Brazil) Pipo Derani										Ret	16	21										10	7	Ret	0
	(United Kingdom) Jack Harvey										14	7	Ret													0
	(Malaysia) Fahmi Ilyas				9	8	15†				Ret	Ret	12													0
	(Brazil) Felipe Nasr																						Ret	10	DNS	0
	(Australia) Spike Goddard										17	22	17	17	17	11										0
	(Australia) Geoff Uhrhane				12	14	12				12	15	Ret													0
	(Australia) Nick McBride										13	24	15													0
	(Netherlands) Dennis van de Laar																						14	15	16	0
	(Australia) Duvashen Padayachee										21	23	20													0
Pos	Driver	HOC (Germany)			BRH (United Kingdom)			RBR (Austria)			NOR (Germany)			NÜR (Germany)			ZAN (Netherlands)			VAL (Spain)			HOC (Germany)			Pts

Colour	Result
Gold	Winner
Silver	Second place
Bronze	Third place
Green	Points classification
Blue	Non-points classification
Blue	Non-classified finish (NC)
Purple	Retired, not classified (Ret)
Red	Did not qualify (DNQ)
Red	Did not pre-qualify (DNPQ)
Black	Disqualified (DSQ)
White	Did not start (DNS)
White	Withdrew (WD)
White	Race cancelled (C)
Blank	Did not practice (DNP)
Blank	Did not arrive (DNA)
Blank	Excluded (EX)

**Bold** – Pole
Italics – Fastest Lap

† — Drivers did not finish the race, but were classified as they completed over 90% of the race distance.

=== Teams' Championship ===
Pos	Team	HOC (Germany)			BRH (United Kingdom)			RBR (Austria)			NOR (Germany)			NÜR (Germany)			ZAN (Netherlands)			VAL (Spain)			HOC (Germany)			Pts
1	(Italy) Prema Powerteam	1	1	1	1	2	1	1	2	1	9	11	1	1	2	6	2	2	1	1	1	2	3	1	4	609.5
1	(Italy) Prema Powerteam	6	6	5	2	4	3	4	4	3	22	13	2	2	5	Ret	3	5	Ret	2	2	3	5	2	6	609.5
2	(Germany) Mücke Motorsport	3	2	3	5	3	5	2	6	4	6	3	14	3	3	1	1	3	3	5	3	1	1	8	1	441.5
2	(Germany) Mücke Motorsport	Ret	9	8	7	5	Ret	9	Ret	11	7	4	Ret	4	4	Ret	7	6	4	13	8	4	2	9	2	441.5
3	(United Kingdom) Carlin	2	4	2	4	6	2	8	1	2	2	5	18	7	10	2	8	1	2	6	5	6	6	5	11	294.5
3	(United Kingdom) Carlin	4	5	6	Ret	10	4	16	7	5	Ret	25	19	10	15	10	11	9	5	Ret	10	9	Ret	13	Ret	294.5
4	(Germany) ma-con Motorsport	7	11	11	10	9	7	5	3	7	3	6	4	9	6	4	5	4	6	3	4	5	4	6	7	248.5
4	(Germany) ma-con Motorsport	11	12	12	11	11	9	11	10	14	10	Ret	7	11	11	5	9	8	Ret	4	6	7	11	11	9	248.5
5	(Switzerland) Jo Zeller Racing	12	15	10	13	15	11	10	11	9	11	12	13	13	14	9	12	10	8	9	9	10	12	16	13	38
5	(Switzerland) Jo Zeller Racing	Ret	16	14	14	17	14	15	12	Ret	16	19	23	16	16	Ret	13	11	9	12	13	11	15	18	14	38
6	(Germany) URD Rennsport	8	7	15	Ret	16	13	13	14	12	Ret	20	22	12	13	8	10	7	7	11	12	12	8	3	15	36
7	(Portugal) Angola Racing Team	13	14	13	DNS	DNS	DNS	12	13	Ret	15	18	16	14	12	7	14	12	Ret	10	11	14	Ret	17	12	14
8	(Germany) GU-Racing	14	17	16				14	15	13	Ret	21	Ret													0
Guest teams ineligible for points
	(Finland) ThreeBond with T-Sport										13	22	15	8	1	11										0
	(Finland) ThreeBond with T-Sport										17	24	17	17	17	12										0
	(United Kingdom) Fortec Motorsports	5	2	4							5	2	3										10	7	3	0
	(United Kingdom) Fortec Motorsports	10	8	7							19	9	5										16	12	5	0
	(Netherlands) Van Amersfoort Racing																						7	4	16	0
	(Netherlands) Van Amersfoort Racing																						14	15	Ret	0
	(Finland) Double R Racing				9	8	12				12	15	12													0
	(Finland) Double R Racing				12	14	15				21	Ret	20													0
Pos	Team	HOC (Germany)			BRH (United Kingdom)			RBR (Austria)			NOR (Germany)			NÜR (Germany)			ZAN (Netherlands)			VAL (Spain)			HOC (Germany)			Pts

Colour	Result
Gold	Winner
Silver	Second place
Bronze	Third place
Green	Points classification
Blue	Non-points classification
Blue	Non-classified finish (NC)
Purple	Retired, not classified (Ret)
Red	Did not qualify (DNQ)
Red	Did not pre-qualify (DNPQ)
Black	Disqualified (DSQ)
White	Did not start (DNS)
White	Withdrew (WD)
White	Race cancelled (C)
Blank	Did not practice (DNP)
Blank	Did not arrive (DNA)
Blank	Excluded (EX)

**Bold** – Pole
Italics – Fastest Lap

=== Nations Cup ===
Pos	Nation	HOC (Germany)			BRH (United Kingdom)			RBR (Austria)			NOR (Germany)			NÜR (Germany)			ZAN (Netherlands)			VAL (Spain)			HOC (Germany)			Pts
1	Germany	8	6	5	5	2	5	2	4	3	7	3	11	2	4	1	2	3	3	5	2	4	2	1	2	423
1	Germany	15	7	8	6	3	10	4	6	4	9	Ret	Ret	3	5	8	7	5	7	7	3	12	5	3	6	423
2	Great Britain	4	4	6	10	9	2	5	1	2	2	5	4	9	6	2	5	1	2	3	4	5	4	5	7	383
2	Great Britain	7	11	11	11	10	7	8	3	7	3	6	7	10	10	4	8	4	6	4	6	7	6	6	9	383
3	Spain	1	5	1	2	6	4	7	7	1	Ret	11	2	1	8	10	6	2	1	2	7	2	13	13	4	352
3	Spain	2	Ret	2	4	15	8	16	8	5	DSQ	25	19	7	15	DSQ	11	9	5	Ret	10	6	Ret	Ret	11	352
4	Italy	6	1	14	1	7	1	1	9	8	16	17	1	6	2	Ret	4	11	8	1	9	3	3	2	8	234.5
4	Italy	Ret	16	17	14	15	11	10	11	Ret	22	19	13	13	14	Ret	13	13	Ret	9	Ret	10	12	18	13	234.5
5	Sweden	3	3	3	7	5	Ret	9	Ret	11	6	4	14	4	3	Ret	1	6	4	13	8	1	1	9	1	212.5
6	United States	9	10	Ret	3	4	3	6	2	6	Ret	13	8	15	9	6	3	Ret	Ret	8	1	8	9	14	10	127
7	Switzerland	12	15	10	13	17	14	15	12	9	11	12	23	16	16	9	12	10	9	12	13	11	15	16	14	23
8	Angola	13	14	13	DNS	DNS	DNS	12	13	Ret	15	21	16	14	12	7	14	12	Ret	10	11	14	Ret	17	12	14
Guest nations ineligible for points
	Malaysia				8	1	15	3	5	10	18	14	12	5	7	3										0
	Malaysia				9	8	Ret				Ret	Ret	Ret													0
	Puerto Rico	Ret	13	9							5	2	3										16	19	5	0
	Netherlands	5	2	7							20	10	5										14	15	16	0
	Brazil										4	8	6										10	7	Ret	0
	Brazil										Ret	16	21										Ret	10	DNS	0
	Austria																						7	4	Ret	0
	Australia				12	14	12				12	15	15	17	17	11										0
	Australia										13	22	17													0
Pos	Nation	HOC (Germany)			BRH (United Kingdom)			RBR (Austria)			NOR (Germany)			NÜR (Germany)			ZAN (Netherlands)			VAL (Spain)			HOC (Germany)			Pts

Colour	Result
Gold	Winner
Silver	Second place
Bronze	Third place
Green	Points classification
Blue	Non-points classification
Blue	Non-classified finish (NC)
Purple	Retired, not classified (Ret)
Red	Did not qualify (DNQ)
Red	Did not pre-qualify (DNPQ)
Black	Disqualified (DSQ)
White	Did not start (DNS)
White	Withdrew (WD)
White	Race cancelled (C)
Blank	Did not practice (DNP)
Blank	Did not arrive (DNA)
Blank	Excluded (EX)

**Bold** – Pole
Italics – Fastest Lap
