= Kabrena Rodda =

American chemist

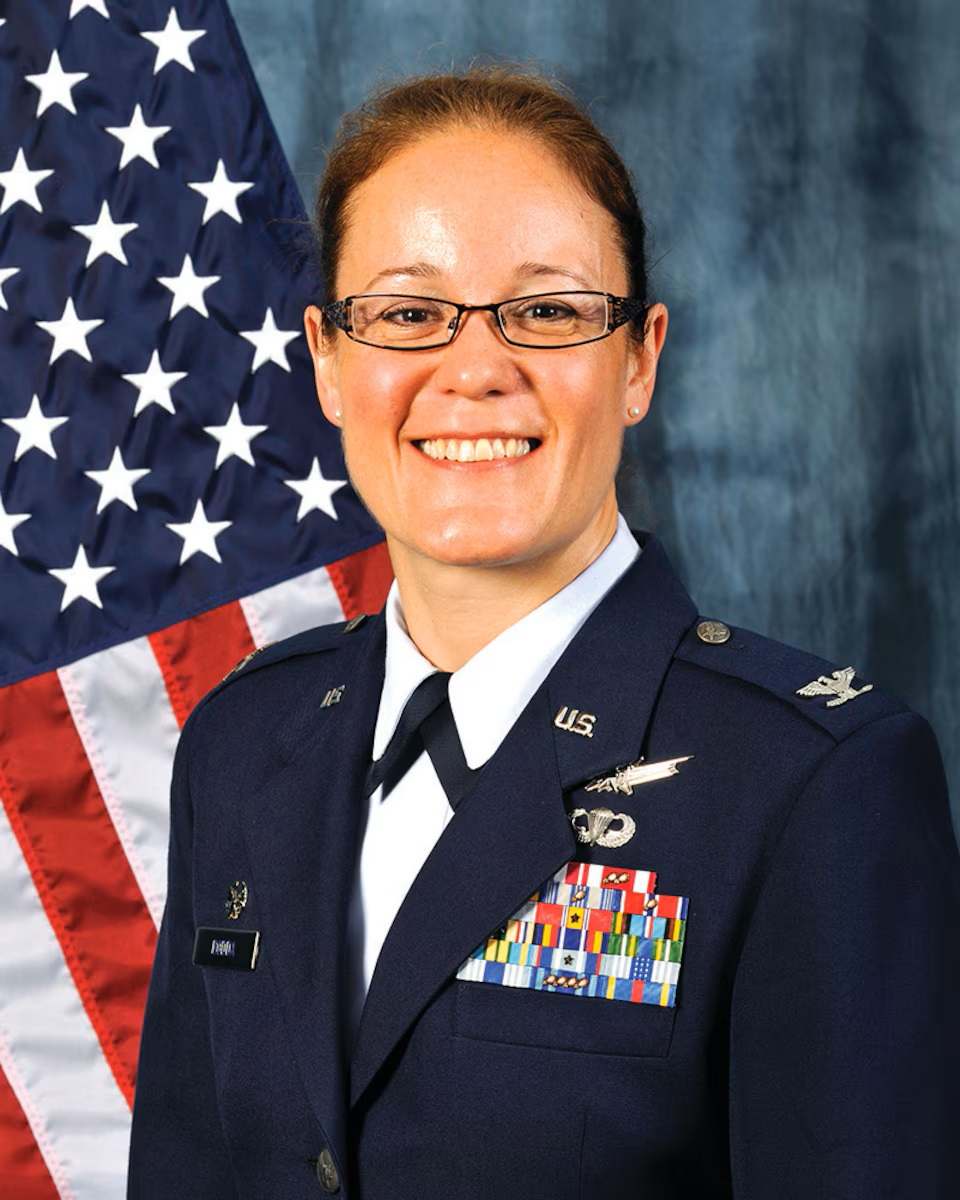
- Rodda in 2012, as the first woman to command the United States Air Force Academy Preparatory School
- Education: University of Washington; Monash University; United States Air Force Academy
- Scientific career
- Workplaces: United States Air Force; Pacific Northwest National Laboratory

Kabrena Rodda is an American chemist who is the Analytical Chemistry and Instrumentation Group Leader at the Pacific Northwest National Laboratory. She leads the PNNL strategy to tackle emerging chemical threats. She was elected Fellow of the American Chemical Society in 2024.

== Early life and education ==
Rodda chose to join the military during her high school studies. She entered the United States Air Force Academy, where she loved the hands-on aspect of an academy education -- particularly her experiences learning science through chemistry labs. One of her first military assignments was serving as a chemical weapons inspector, performing analytical lab studies to support the United Nations. She completed a master's degree at the University of Washington in analytical chemistry, studying the postmortem forensic toxicology of serotonergic drugs for her thesis. She returned to the Air Force Academy to teach chemistry, and then moved to Monash University for her doctoral studies in the field of forensic toxicology. She developed methods to screen postmortem human tissue for psychiatric medicines and commonly abused drugs, and then used those methods to study trends in human fatalities involving the studied drugs.

== Career ==
Rodda spent much of her career in the United States Air Force. Between completing her advanced degrees and teaching at the Air Force Academy, she performed duties in support of US weapons treaty monitoring and counter-weapons of mass destruction (Counter-WMD) activities.

During her time serving in the US Air Force, Rodda managed a $30 million nuclear nonproliferation program, and later served as a Senior Military Advisor on chemical issues at the National Counterproliferation Center. Retiring as a colonel, she also had the honor of serving as a commander at the Detachment, Squadron, and Group level. She worked with the United Nations Special Commission (UNSCOM) as a weapons inspector and laboratory chief in Iraq in the nineties, and has since led efforts to educate others on how to recognize and actionably respond to evolving chemical threats. Twenty years later, in partnership with the Organization for Prohibition of Chemical Weapons, Rodda led the writing team for the American Chemical Society policy statement Preventing the Reemergence of Chemical Weapons. Rodda worked on consequence management as part of the build up to the Sydney Olympics.

At National War College, Rodda studied national security strategy and wrote a policy paper on synthetic street drugs (then commonly referred to as "legal highs") in which she promoted influenza-like surveillance to get ahead of the public health threat they present, described the rising unexpected toxicities and deaths involving such drugs as the "new pandemic".

Rodda eventually joined Pacific Northwest National Laboratory, where she continued to work on chemical security, and the development of an ethical framework for chemistry research. She currently manages the Analytical Chemistry and Instrumentation program within PNNL's Nuclear, Chemical, and Biological Technologies Division and serves as PNNL’s Air Force and Space Force subsector manager, bridging the gap between fundamental scientific research and development and military operational needs.

== Awards and honors ==
- OPCW Director General's Medal
- 2017 Secretary of Energy Appreciation Award
- Secretary of the United States Air Force R&D Award
- 2022 Joined National Academies’ Committee on Chemical Threats
- 2024 Elected Fellow of the American Chemical Society

== Selected publications ==
- Kabrena E. Rodda; Olaf H. Drummer (December 2006). "The redistribution of selected psychiatric drugs in post-mortem cases". Forensic Science International. 164 (2–3): 235–239. doi:10.1016/j.forsciint.2006.02.013. ISSN 0379-0738. PMID 16554130. Wikidata Q57986652.
- "Ethics Education for Chemists". Nature Chemistry.
- "Tools and Incentives for Implementing Codes of Ethics to Help Prevent the Reemergence of Chemical Weapons". Journal of Chemical Education.
- "Chemical Issues in Context: The Role of Intent in Nonproliferation & Disarmament". ACS Symposium Series.
- "Brain Distribution of Selected Antipsychotics in Schizophrenia". Forensic Science International.
- "LC-MS Analysis of Psychiatric Drugs". Journal of Analytical Toxicology.
- "Postmortem Tissue Concentrations of Venlafaxine". Forensic Science International.
- "Postmortem Forensic Toxicology of Trazodone". Journal of Forensic Sciences.
- "Postmortem Forensic Toxicology of Selective Serotonin Reuptake Inhibitors:A Review of Pharmacology and Report of 168 Cases". Journal of Forensic Sciences.
- "Identification of Tramadol and its Metabolites in Blood from Drug-Related Deaths and Drug-Impaired Drives". Journal of Analytical Toxicology.
- "Preventing the Re-Emergence of Chemical Weapons". OPCW.
