= Tom Blomqvist =

British racing driver (born 1993)

- Blomqvist in 2022
- Nationality: (United Kingdom) British (Sweden) Swedish (New Zealand) New Zealander via to triple nationality
- Born: Tom Leonard Blomqvist; 30 November 1993 (age 32); Cambridge, Cambridgeshire, England

IndyCar Series career
- 8 races run over 2 years
- Best finish: 30th (2024)
- First race: 2023 Honda Indy Toronto (Exhibition Place)
- Last race: 2024 Indianapolis 500 (Indianapolis)
Wins	Podiums	Poles
0	0	0

Formula E career
- Debut season: 2017–18
- Car number: 88
- Former teams: MS&AD Andretti Formula E, Panasonic Jaguar Racing, NIO 333 FE Team
- Starts: 25
- Championships: 0
- Wins: 0
- Podiums: 0
- Poles: 0
- Fastest laps: 0
- Best finish: 20th in 2017–18

Deutsche Tourenwagen Masters career
- Debut season: 2015
- Categorisation: FIA Gold (until 2015); FIA Platinum (2016–)
- Car number: 31
- Former teams: BMW Team RBM
- Starts: 54
- Wins: 1
- Poles: 3
- Fastest laps: 3
- Best finish: 6th in 2016

Previous series
- 2012–2014 2012: European Formula 3 Championship; Formula 3 Euro Series

Championship titles
- 2022 2010: IMSA SportsCar Championship; Formula Renault UK

Tom Leonard Blomqvist (born 30 November 1993) is a British-born Swedish racing driver, who competes in the IMSA SportsCar Championship with Meyer Shank Racing as a factory driver for Acura. Blomqvist won the 2022 and 2023 24 Hours of Daytona with Meyer Shank and the 2018 24 Hours of Spa with BMW Motorsport. He is the son of 1984 Swedish World Rally Champion, Stig Blomqvist.

== Early career ==
=== Junior career ===
Blomqvist began his racing career in karting, in which he competed between 2003 and 2008, winning eight Championship titles in New Zealand. In 2009, at the age of fifteen, he left his home in New Zealand and moved to Europe to compete in the Formula Renault 2.0 Sweden. Blomqvist took five podium finishes and one victory from fourteen races, finishing third in the standings. He also finished third in the Formula Renault NEZ Championship. At the end of the season, having to first apply for special permission to race as he was still only fifteen years old, he competed in two of the four races of the Formula Renault UK Winter Series winning both of the races at the Rockingham Motor Speedway.

In 2010, Blomqvist competed in the full Formula Renault UK season racing for Fortec Motorsport, taking twelve podiums on his way to becoming the youngest ever champion in the series' history at the age of 16, beating the record set by Lewis Hamilton who won the Championship aged 18.

November 2010 saw Blomqvist compete in the iconic Macau Grand Prix. Driving for Eurointernational, he secured third place with fastest lap time in the Formula BMW Pacific race.

In December 2010, Blomqvist was a McLaren Autosport BRDC Award finalist as well as receiving the British Club Driver of the Year award. At the British Racing Drivers' Club awards, he received the Henry Surtees award for the most outstanding performance by a rising star.

On 30 November 2011, Blomqvist signed with MB Partners Ltd, owned by former F1 driver Mark Blundell. Blomqvist was again a McLaren Autosport BRDC Award finalist at the end of 2011.

In February 2012, Blomqvist joined the select group of young talent on the McLaren Driver Development Programme.

In the same month, Blomqvist was one of six finalists in a large selection process as Porsche looked for two new junior drivers who would also be contesting the Porsche Carrera Cup. Despite the accolade of being chosen as one of the drivers, Blomqvist elected to stay in single-seaters and a few weeks later, having been selected as a European F3 VW Factory Driver, he signed with ma-con motorsport to contest the F3 Euroseries.

=== Formula 3 (2010–2014) ===
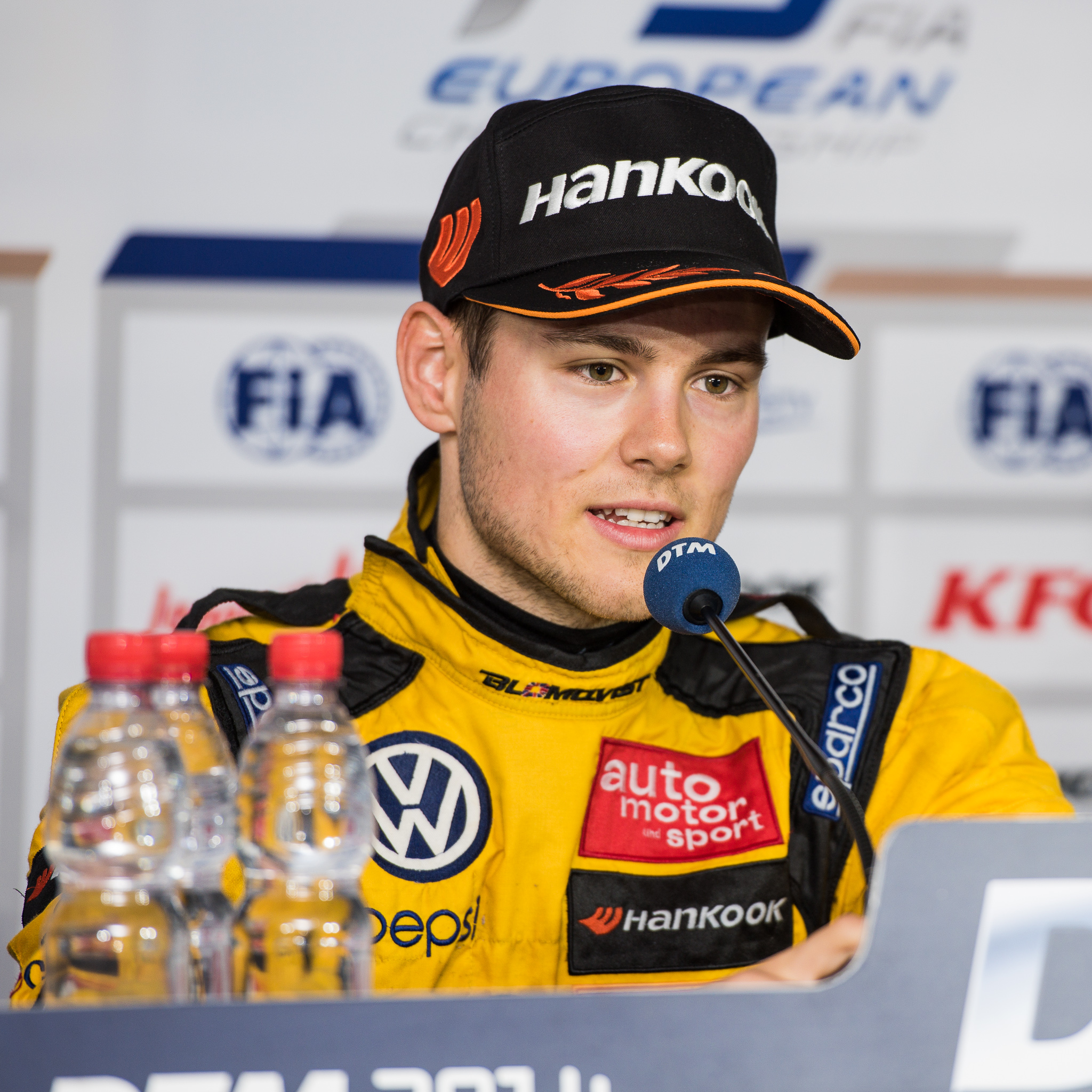
Blomqvist in 2014

Because of his outstanding success at Macau in 2010, 2011 saw Blomqvist competing in German F3 with Performance Racing. Despite competing against stronger teams, he was third in the Championship, when at the start of the race at EuroSpeedway Lausitz he was hit by another car and propelled into a wall, prematurely ending his season and breaking his back at the same time. It would require several months of recuperation before Blomqvist was fit to drive again.

Nonetheless, Eurointernational invited Blomqvist to compete in the 2012 German F3 Championship, fitting the races around his F3 Euroseries schedule. Despite competing in only five rounds due to his prior injury, Blomqvist was fifth in the Championship having achieved an impressive ten podiums, including five wins, and led by sixteen points for these rounds.

Blomqvist finished the season in seventh place for both the F3 Euroseries and the FIA European Formula 3 Championship, having competed with a team new to Formula 3. He entered the Macau F3 street circuit race in November 2012 where he and his team, Eurointernational, used a brand new car, but with no time to test beforehand, the results were disappointing.

At the end of 2012, Blomqvist was selected to join the Red Bull Junior Team and competed in the newly formed FIA European Formula 3 Championship this year — billed as "the most competitive young talent series on the planet" – where he joined his former team EuroInternational as their lone driver for the 2013 season. Despite the team being new to Formula 3, Blomqvist finished the season in seventh place and EuroInternational finished fifth in the Team Championship. Quite an achievement considering all their points were harvested by just one driver, Blomqvist, whereas the teams that finished ahead each had several drivers.

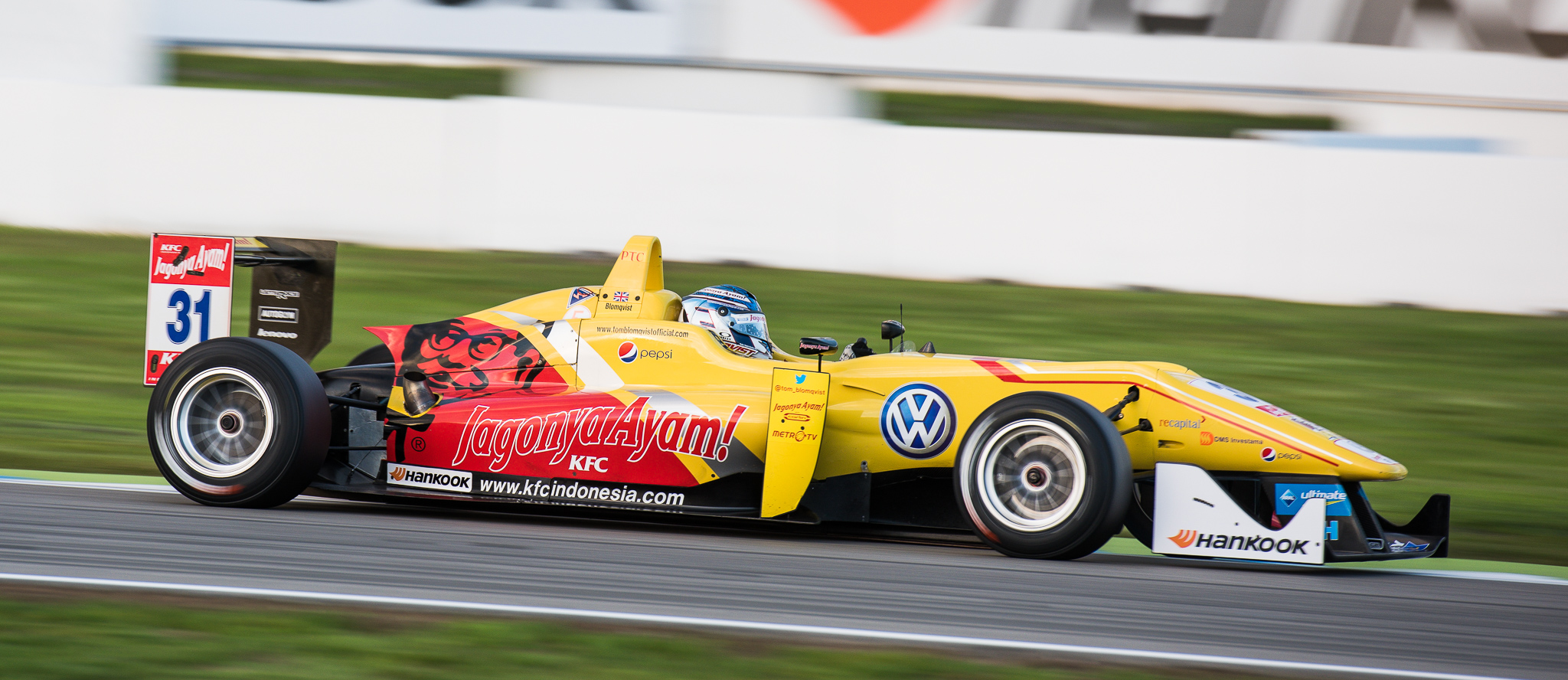
Blomqvist in F3 – Hockenheimring 2014

In November 2013, Blomqvist entered the Macau Grand Prix, this time driving for his former team, Fortec Motorsport. The Red Bull Junior driver was back on pace and looking at starting on pole. However, in the dying minutes of the session Blomqvist was unable to get another clear lap, losing pole position and ending up sixth. During the qualifying race, the unfamiliar starting procedure of the Fortec car caused him to stall at the start. While waiting to be restarted, a distracted Harry Tincknell, who had also momentarily stalled, drove straight into the back of him, ending Blomqvist's day and causing him to start at the back of the grid for the final race. Blomqvist then went on to have a great race the following day. He charged his way through the 28-car field, and when the checkered flag was shown fifteen laps later, Blomqvist came home in eighth place.

For 2014, Blomqvist again competed in the European Formula 3 Championship driving for Carlin, along with his teammates, Antonio Giovinazzi and Sean Gelael, driving under a new banner of Jagonya Ayam with Carlin in their Dallara-Volkswagens. Blomqvist finished second in the championship, despite incurring engine change penalties.

In November 2014, Blomqvist entered the Macau Grand Prix driving his Jagonya Ayam with Carlin car. Despite being one of the quickest drivers on the track in practice and qualifying, Blomqvist's luck ran out within the first lap of the Grand Prix. After making a great start from third, Blomqvist was challenging for the lead which he took after Lucas Auer made a mistake a few corners in. As Blomqvist took the corner, Esteban Ocon made an over optimistic move from behind, and the two collided. Although Ocon had damaged his suspension at San Francisco Bend, he managed to go on, but a powerless Blomqvist was driven into the barriers, ending his race. Due to the narrow track there was a multiple car pile-up behind, with Yu Kanamaru getting launched first over Jordan King and then Blomqvist, before landing on a wall at the side of the track. No one was hurt in the chaos, and after the race was restarted Felix Rosenqvist went on to become the 2014 winner.

== DTM (2015–2017) ==
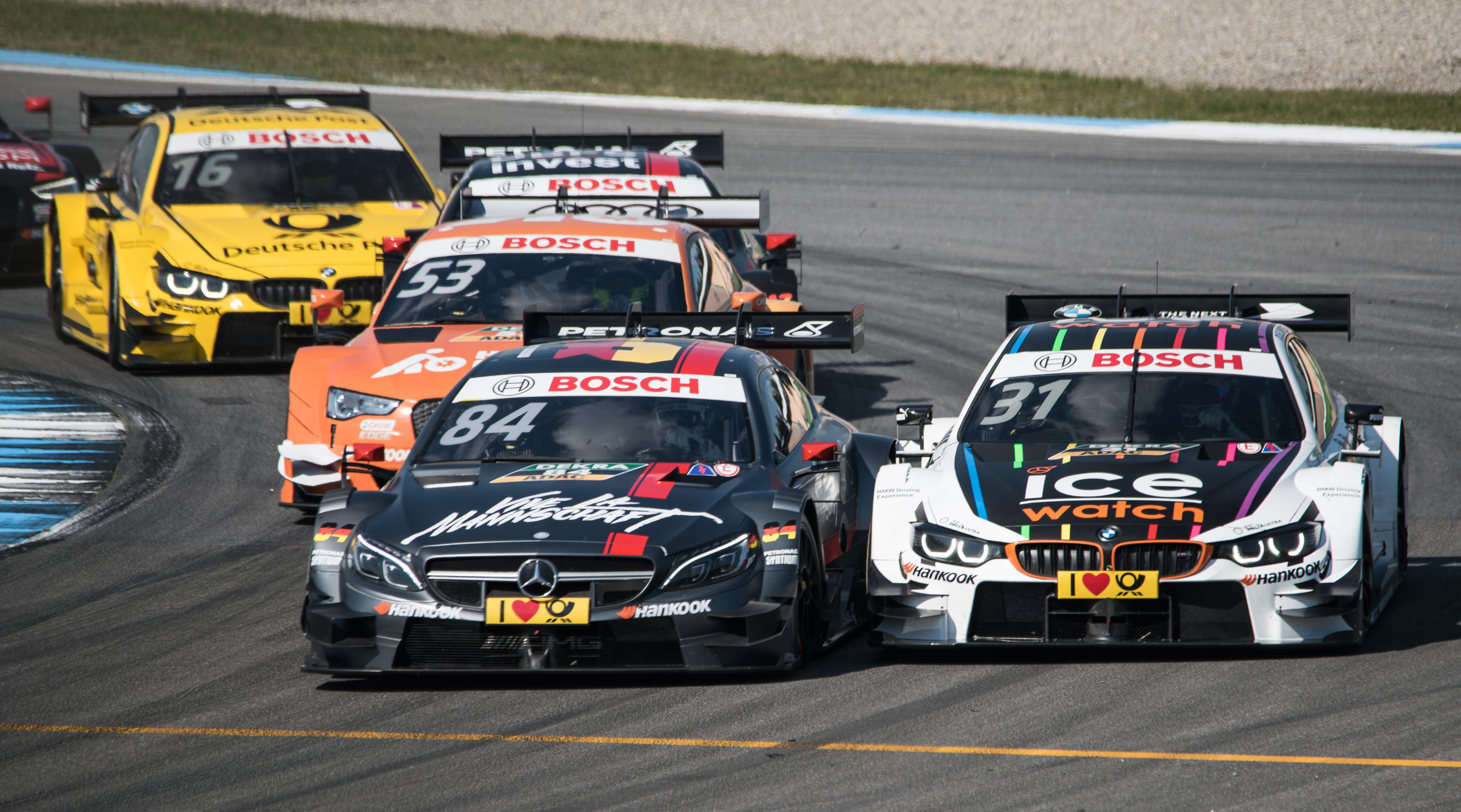
Blomqvist (right) battling Maximilian Götz at the Hockenheimring during the 2016 Deutsche Tourenwagen Masters season.

=== 2015 ===
On 2 February 2015, it was announced Blomqvist had secured a BMW DTM drive for multiple seasons, replacing the spot left vacant by the departure of Joey Hand. The announcement followed a selection test carried out by Blomqvist, Jack Harvey, Robin Frijns, Lucas Luhr, Richie Stanaway, Alex Lynn, Sam Bird and Alex Gurney at Jerez in December 2014. Blomqvist joined the RBM Team alongside Augusto Farfus and finished the season in a respectable fourteenth place, having made DTM history as the youngest BMW driver to win a race in his first season, at Oschersleben, and the second youngest race winner with any manufacturer.

=== 2016 ===
For the 2016 season, Blomqvist remained with the RBM Team but with a new teammate, Maxime Martin. He concluded a successful 2016 DTM season in point-scoring fashion at the series' finale in Hockenheim, ending the season in sixth position in the Drivers' Championship, the youngest driver in the top ten of the season's final standings.

=== 2017 ===
2017 saw Blomqvist remain with BMW and Team RBM, but in the newly formed Team RBR, with ex Formula One driver Timo Glock as his stablemate.

== Formula E (2017–2021) ==
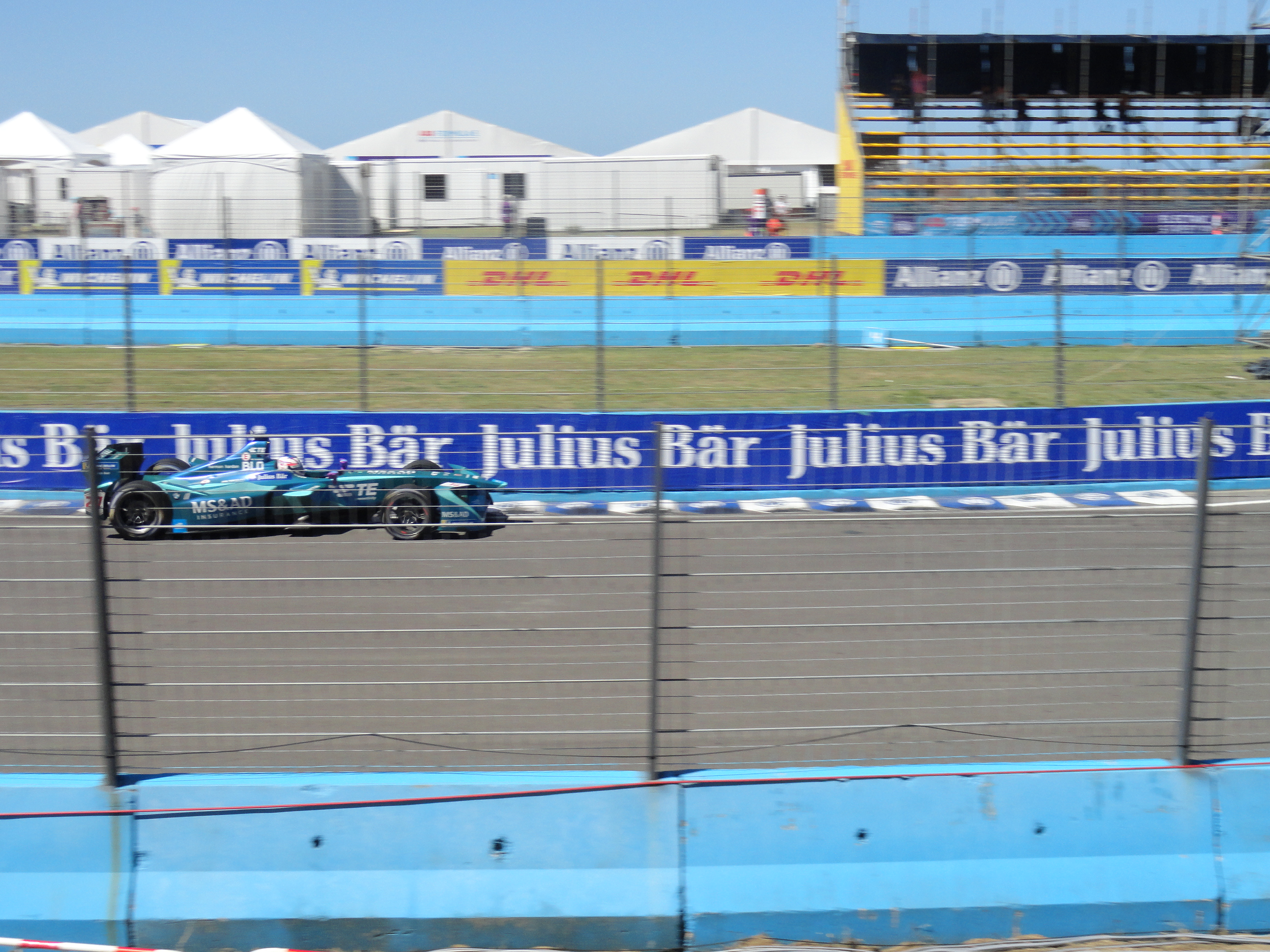
Blomqvist during qualifying for the 2018 Punta del Este ePrix.

=== 2017–18 season ===
Blomqvist participated in the 2017–18 Formula E season with the MS&AD Andretti Formula E team. This caused some confusion as he was confirmed by the official FIA entry list, rather than an announcement by the team. He made his debut at Marrakesh ePrix, replacing Kamui Kobayashi. His teammate was António Félix da Costa, who had raced in Formula E since the inaugural 2014–15 season (with Team Aguri for 2014–15). Despite a strong debut in Marrakesh, finishing in eighth position, his results were not considered good enough by the team & he was replaced with Stéphane Sarrazin for the final four races of the season. Blomqvist returned to the Formula E paddock for the 2019 Berlin ePrix, where he acted as a TV pundit, in place of the regular Dario Franchitti, who was attending the 2019 Indy 500.

=== 2019–20 season ===
Blomqvist returned to the race seat for the final two races of the 2019–20 season-ending 2020 Berlin ePrix, replacing Jaguar's James Calado, who had other commitments.

=== 2020–21 season ===
Blomqvist was then given a full-time seat at the NIO 333 FE Team for the 2020–21 Formula E World Championship, driving alongside fellow Briton Oliver Turvey. The car was one of the slowest on the grid, finishing in last place of the constructors, with Blomqvist accumulating six points, and Turvey with thirteen points.

For the 2021–22 season, Blomqvist opted to leave NIO and joined Envision Racing as a reserve driver.

== FIA World Endurance Championship (2018–present) ==
=== 2018 ===
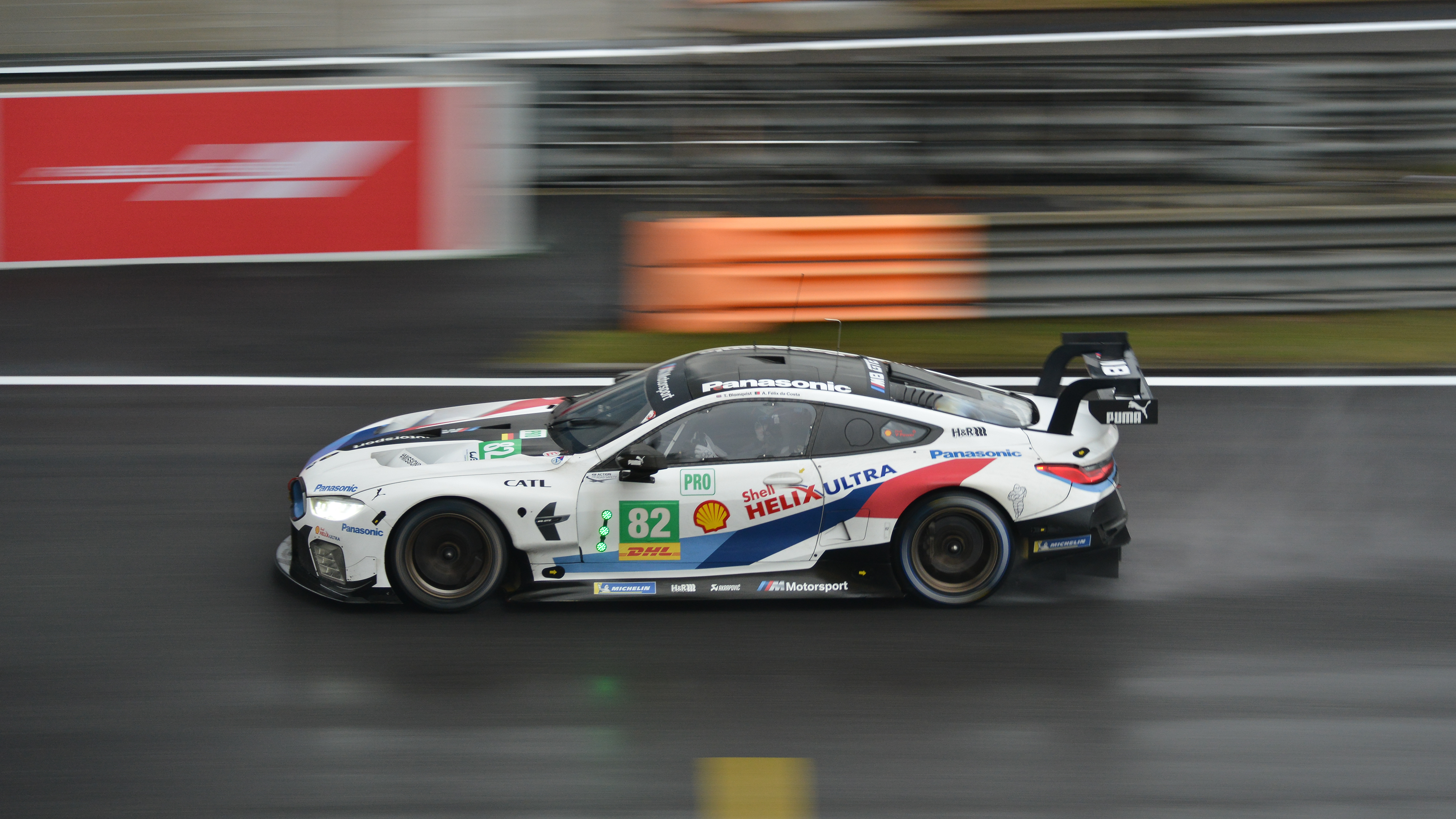
Blomqvist driving at the 2018 6 Hours of Shanghai.

In the 2018 Blancpain GT Series Endurance Cup, driving a BMW M6 GT3 for Team Walkenhorst Motorsport, Blomqvist, and teammates Philipp Eng and Christian Krognes won the 2018 24 Hours of Spa.

=== 2021 ===
During the 2021 FIA World Endurance Championship, Blomqvist, ex-teammate at Carlin in F3 Sean Gelael, and ex-Formula 1 driver Stoffel Vandoorne were driving an Oreca 07 for Jota Sport team, in the Le Mans Prototype2 class. They finished second in the class, collecting four podiums out of the five races, including a second place in the famous 24 Hours of Le Mans.

=== 2023 ===
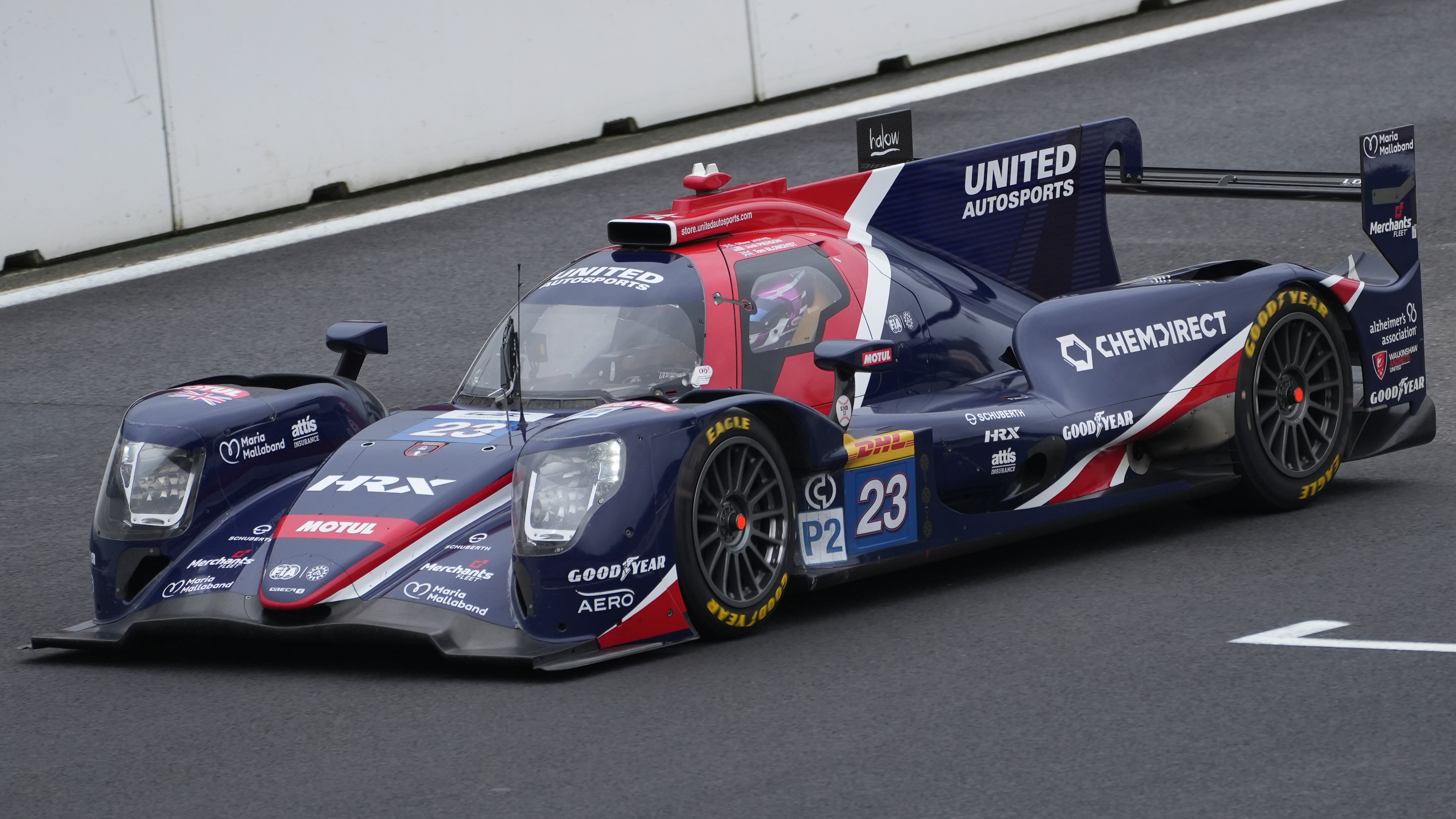
Blomqvist finished second in class at the 2023 6 Hours of Spa-Francorchamps.

Blomqvist would return to the 2023 FIA World Endurance Championship with United Autosports in the LMP2 category alongside Oliver Jarvis and Josh Pierson. He served as the replacement for Alex Lynn, who moved to the Hypercar class with Chip Ganassi Racing. Blomqvist stated that a large part of his decision to take the drive was the presence of Jarvis, with whom he won the DPi class title in the IMSA SportsCar Championship the previous year.

== IMSA (2019–present) ==
=== 2019 ===
Blomqvist made his debut in the 2018 IMSA SportsCar Championship at the wheel of a BMW M8 GTE, at Watkins Glen International, in a one-off race appearance, and finished in a respectable eighth in the GT Le Mans category. In 2019, he stuck around for a full season, driving the BMW of M8 GTE of Rahal Letterman Lanigan Racing once again. He scored solid points all throughout the season, with his best finish coming in the season's finale at the 2019 Petit Le Mans, a third place podium. He ended the year ninth in the GT Le Mans category, with 258 points.

=== 2022 ===
Following his Formula E campaign, Blomqvist was announced in November 2021, as one of the driver's for Meyer Shank Racing in the 2022 IMSA SportsCar Championship, driving the Acura ARX-05 along with teammate Oliver Jarvis. He started the season with a win at the Rolex 24 and won again that season at Road Atlanta. This would secure him and Jarvis the title that season.

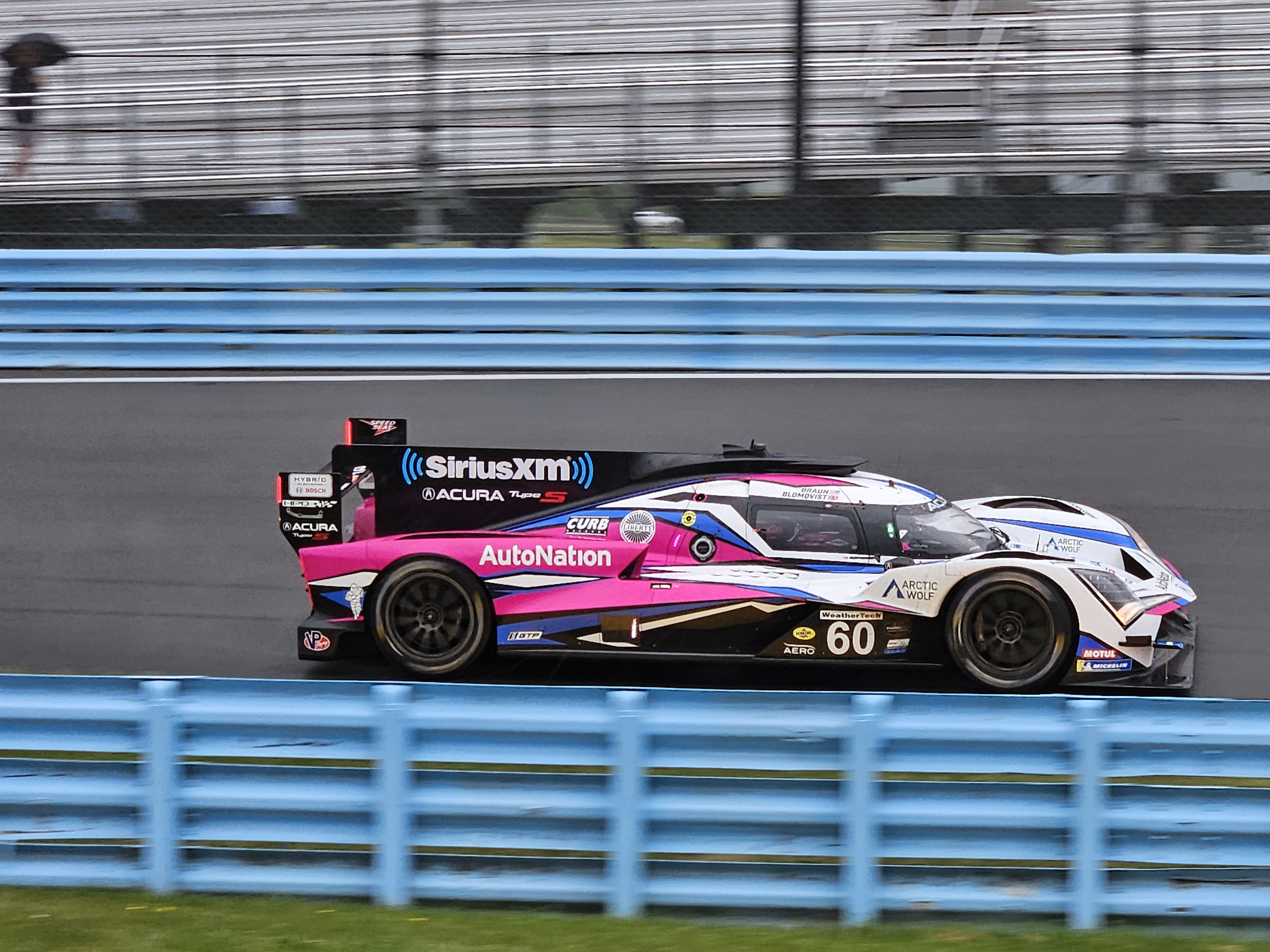
Blomqvist competing at Watkins Glen during the 2023 IMSA SportsCar Championship.

=== 2023 ===
For 2023, Blomqvist was retained by Meyer Shank Racing, this time driving the brand new Acura ARX-06 in the revived GTP class, being partnered by Colin Braun. Blomqvist and Meyer Shank started the season in the same way as 2022, winning the Rolex 24. The pair would also go on to win the Chevrolet Sports Car Grand Prix at Canadian Tire Motorsport Park in the 2023 season.

=== 2024 ===
Despite Meyer Shank's departure from IMSA for the 2024 IMSA SportsCar Championship and Blomqvist's becoming a full-time IndyCar driver, he signed on to compete in the Michelin Endurance Cup races in the No. 31 Whelen Engineering Action Express Racing Cadillac V-Series.R LMDh alongside Pipo Derani and Jack Aitken in 2024.

== IndyCar (2023–2024) ==
=== 2022 ===
Following his successful season in IMSA for Meyer Shank Racing, Blomqvist tested one of the team's cars in October 2022 in a private IndyCar driver evaluation test at Sebring. He was fastest out of the 5 participants.

=== 2023 ===
On 11 July 2023, Meyer Shank Racing announced Blomqvist would drive the No. 60 car at Toronto for Simon Pagenaud, who was not cleared to race following an accident at Mid-Ohio. In his first IndyCar race, Blomqvist qualified 20th out of 27 cars, but crashed out on the first lap as he was pushed into the wall by Ryan Hunter-Reay and Jack Harvey. On 11 August 2023, Meyer Shank Racing announced that Blomqvist will be a full-time driver on the Meyer Shank team for the 2024 IndyCar Series, with Hélio Castroneves moving to a part time role, including Castroneves's running in the 2024 Indianapolis 500.

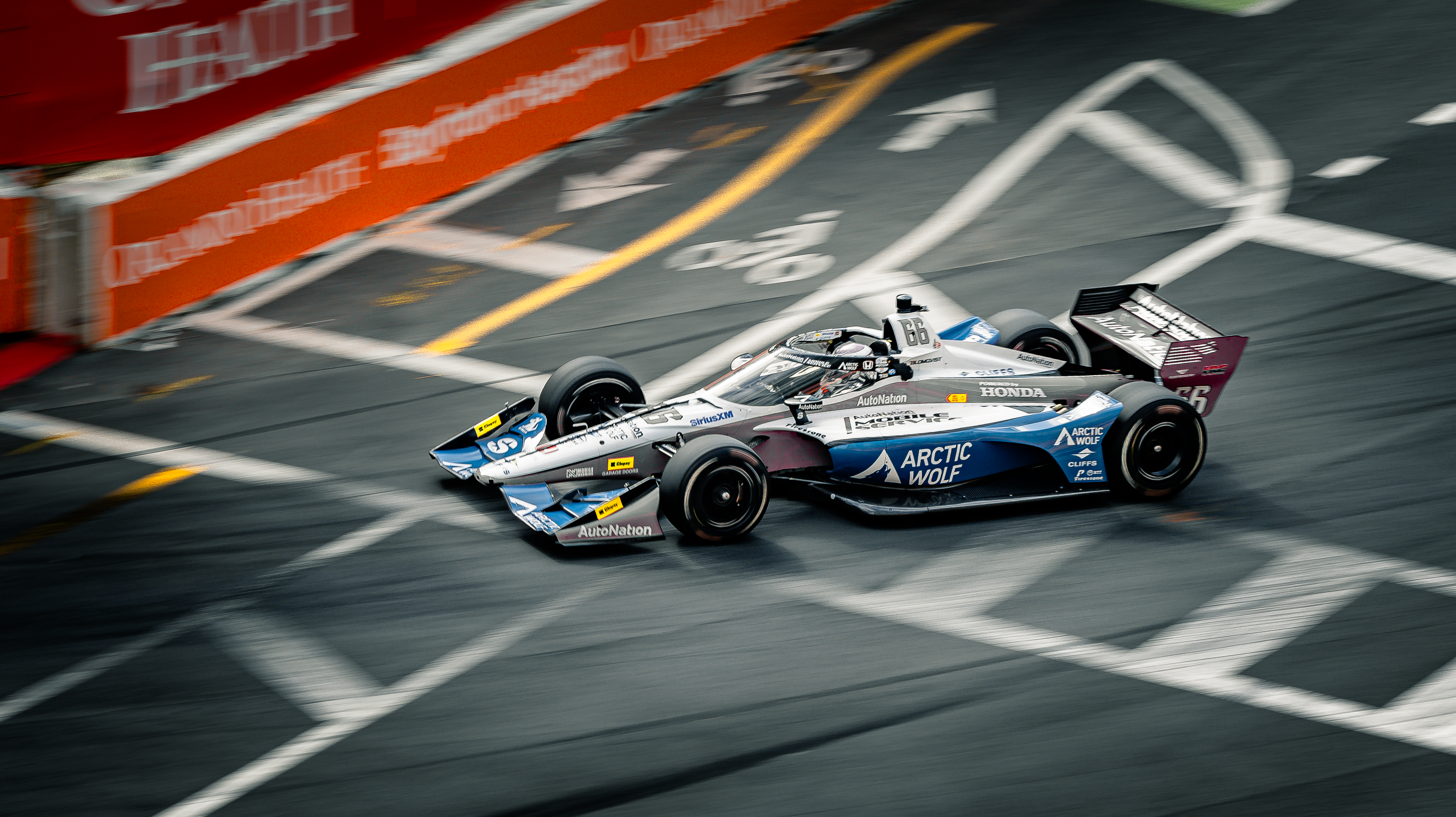
Blomqvist competing in the 2024 Firestone Grand Prix of St. Petersburg

=== 2024 ===
Blomqvist would start the 2024 IndyCar Series partnering Felix Rosenqvist. He scored two top-twenty finishes during the opening rounds, though his season would end after a lap one crash at the Indianapolis 500 involving himself, Marcus Ericsson, and Pietro Fittipaldi, which caused him to be replaced by Hélio Castroneves for the next two races. He was replaced by David Malukas for the rest of the season.

== Personal life ==
Blomqvist was born in the United Kingdom and lived there until his parents split up. After the breakup Blomqvist moved with his mother to New Zealand, where he spent most of his childhood. As his racing career progressed, Blomqvist made the decision to move to Europe, first to Sweden with his father, later to the United Kingdom to live with family friends. He has citizenships of New Zealand, United Kingdom and Sweden and races under the British flag, but considers himself a New Zealander. Blomqvist currently resides in Monaco.

== Racing record ==
=== Career summary ===
Season	Series	Team	Races	Wins	Poles	F/Laps	Podiums	Points	Position
2009	Formula Renault 2.0 Sweden	Trackstar Racing	14	1	0	0	5	66	**3rd**
2009	Formula Renault 2.0 NEZ	Trackstar Racing	6	0	0	0	2	78	**3rd**
2009	Formula Renault UK Winter Series	Fortec Motorsport	2	2	0	2	2	68	7th
2010	Formula Renault UK	Fortec Motorsport	20	3	4	7	12	465	**1st**
2010	Formula BMW Pacific	EuroInternational	1	0	0	1	1	0	NC†
2011	German Formula 3 Championship	Performance Racing	14	1	2	2	4	59	6th
2012	German Formula 3 Championship	EuroInternational	15	5	5	1	10	222	5th
2012	Formula 3 Euro Series	Ma-con Motorsport	24	0	0	0	2	157.5	7th
2012	FIA Formula 3 European Championship	Ma-con Motorsport	20	0	0	0	2	117	7th
2013	FIA Formula 3 European Championship	EuroInternational	30	0	0	0	3	151.5	7th
2014	FIA Formula 3 European Championship	Jagonya Ayam with Carlin	33	6	6	9	15	420	**2nd**
2015	Deutsche Tourenwagen Masters	BMW Team RBM	18	1	0	1	1	59	14th
2016	Deutsche Tourenwagen Masters	BMW Team RBM	18	0	1	1	4	113	6th
2016	Blancpain GT Series Endurance Cup	Rowe Racing	1	0	0	0	0	0	NC
2016	FIA World Endurance Championship – LMP2	Extreme Speed Motorsports	1	0	0	0	1	18	24th
2016	24 Hours of Nürburgring – SP9	Walkenhorst Motorsport	1	0	0	0	0	N/A	12th
2016–17	Asian Le Mans Series – GT	FIST-Team AAI	3	0	0	0	0	20	10th
2017	Deutsche Tourenwagen Masters	BMW Team RBM	18	0	2	1	0	25	17th
2017	Blancpain GT Series Sprint Cup	Rowe Racing	2	0	0	0	0	8	19th
2017	Blancpain GT Series Endurance Cup	Rowe Racing	3	0	0	0	0	5	31st
2017	Intercontinental GT Challenge	Rowe Racing	1	0	0	0	0	1	16th
2017	FIA GT World Cup	Rowe Racing	0	0	0	0	0	N/A	DNS
2017	24 Hours of Nürburgring – SP9	BMW Team Schnitzer	1	0	0	0	0	N/A	4th
2017–18	Formula E	MS&AD Andretti Formula E	6	0	0	0	0	4	20th
2018	Blancpain GT Series Endurance Cup	Rowe Racing	2	0	0	0	0	45	5th
2018	Blancpain GT Series Endurance Cup	Walkenhorst Motorsport	1	1	0	0	1	45	5th
2018	IMSA SportsCar Championship – GTLM	BMW Team RLL	1	0	0	0	0	23	23rd
2018	24 Hours of Nürburgring – SP9	Rowe Racing	1	0	0	0	0	N/A	DNF
2018–19	FIA World Endurance Championship – LMGTE Pro	BMW Team MTEK	3	0	0	1	1	29	17th
2019	IMSA SportsCar Championship – GTLM	BMW Team RLL	10	0	0	0	1	258	9th
2019	24 Hours of Nürburgring – SP9	Rowe Racing	1	0	0	0	0	N/A	DNF
2019–20	Formula E	Panasonic Jaguar Racing	2	0	0	0	0	0	26th
2020	GT World Challenge Europe Endurance Cup	HubAuto Corsa	1	0	0	0	0	33	10th
2020	GT World Challenge Europe Endurance Cup	AF Corse	1	1	0	0	1	33	10th
2020	Intercontinental GT Challenge	HubAuto Corsa	1	0	0	0	0	0	NC
2020	Porsche Carrera Cup Scandinavia	Mtech Competition	3	1	0	0	1	0	NC†
2020	24 Hours of Nürburgring – SP9	Rowe Racing	1	0	0	0	0	N/A	4th
2020–21	Formula E	NIO 333 FE Team	15	0	0	0	0	6	24th
2021	FIA World Endurance Championship – LMP2	Jota Sport	6	0	2	1	5	131	**2nd**
2021	Asian Le Mans Series – LMP2	Jota Sport	2	2	0	0	2	50	5th
2021	24 Hours of Le Mans – LMP2	Jota Sport	1	0	0	0	1	N/A	**2nd**
2021–22	Formula E	Envision Racing	Reserve driver						
2022	IMSA SportsCar Championship – DPi	Meyer Shank Racing with Curb-Agajanian	10	2	3	3	7	3432	**1st**
2022	FIA ETCR – eTouring Car World Cup	Cupra EKS	6	1	0	0	4	434	**3rd**
2023	IMSA SportsCar Championship – GTP	Meyer Shank Racing with Curb-Agajanian	9	3	2	1	5	2711	**3rd**
2023	FIA World Endurance Championship – LMP2	United Autosports	4	0	3	0	1	43	12th
2023	24 Hours of Le Mans – LMP2	United Autosports	1	0	0	0	0	N/A	8th
2023	IndyCar Series	Meyer Shank Racing	3	0	0	0	0	16	34th
2024	IndyCar Series	Meyer Shank Racing	6	0	0	0	0	46	30th
2024	IMSA SportsCar Championship – GTP	Whelen Cadillac Racing	5	0	3	1	1	1403	12th
2025	IMSA SportsCar Championship – GTP	Acura Meyer Shank Racing w/Curb-Agajanian	9	1	1	1	3	2602	7th
2025	IMSA SportsCar Championship - LMP2	United Autosports USA	1	0	0	0	1	352	42nd
2025	European Le Mans Series – LMP2	CLX – Pure Rxcing	5	0	0	0	0	15	13th
2026	IMSA SportsCar Championship – GTP	Acura Meyer Shank Racing w/Curb-Agajanian	9	0	2	0	0	2465	10th

^{†} As Blomqvist was a guest driver, he was ineligible to score points.

=== Complete Formula Renault UK results ===
(key) (Races in bold indicate pole position) (Races in italics indicate fastest lap)

Year	Entrant	1	2	3	4	5	6	7	8	9	10	11	12	13	14	15	16	17	18	19	20	21	Pos	Points
2010	Fortec Motorsport	THR; 1; 5	THR; 2; 5	ROC; 1; 7	ROC; 2; 6	BHGP; 1 C	BHGP; 2; 3	**OUL**; **1**; 2	**OUL**; **2**; 2	CRO; 1; 3	CRO; 2; 5	SNE; 1; 7	SNE; 2; 2	SIL1; 1; 13	SIL1; 2; 1	**SIL1**; **3**; 1	**KNO**; **1**; 1	KNO; 2; 5	SIL2; 1; 2	SIL2; 2; 2	BRI; 1; 3	BRI; 2; 2	1st	465

=== Complete Formula 3 Euro Series results ===
(key)

Year	Entrant	Engine	1	2	3	4	5	6	7	8	9	10	11	12	13	14	15	16	17	18	19	20	21	22	23	24	DC	Points
2012	Ma-con Motorsport	Volkswagen	HOC; 1; 7	HOC; 2; 11	HOC; 3; 11	BRH; 1; 10	BRH; 2; 9	BRH; 3; 7	RBR; 1; 5	RBR; 2; 3	RBR; 3; 7	NOR; 1; 10	NOR; 2; 6	NOR; 3; 7	NÜR; 1; 9	NÜR; 2; 6	NÜR; 3; 5	ZAN; 1; 5	ZAN; 2; 4	ZAN; 3 Ret	VAL; 1; 3	VAL; 2; 4	VAL; 3; 5	HOC; 1; 4	HOC; 2; 6	HOC; 3; 7	7th	157.5

=== Complete FIA Formula 3 European Championship results ===
(key)

Year	Entrant	Engine	1	2	3	4	5	6	7	8	9	10	11	12	13	14	15	16	17	18	19	20	21	22	23	24	25	26	27	28	29	30	31	32	33	DC	Points
2012	Ma-con Motorsport	Volkswagen	HOC; 1; 7	HOC; 2; 11	PAU; 1; 13	PAU; 2; 21	BRH; 1; 10	BRH; 2; 7	RBR; 1; 5	RBR; 2; 7	NOR; 1; 10	NOR; 2; 7	SPA; 1; 10	SPA; 2; 2	NÜR; 1; 9	NÜR; 2; 5	ZAN; 1; 5	ZAN; 2 Ret	VAL; 1; 3	VAL; 2; 5	HOC; 1; 4	HOC; 2; 7														7th	117
2013	EuroInternational	Mercedes	MNZ; 1; 13	MNZ; 2; 3	MNZ; 3; 10	SIL; 1; 10	SIL; 2; 5	SIL; 3; 14	HOC; 1; 3	HOC; 2; 3	HOC; 3; 8	BRH; 1; 6	BRH; 2; 6	BRH; 3; 5	RBR; 1; 17	RBR; 2; 8	RBR; 3 Ret	NOR; 1; 5	NOR; 2; 7	NOR; 3; 4	NÜR; 1; 13	NÜR; 2; 12	NÜR; 3; 22	ZAN; 1; 9	ZAN; 2; 8	ZAN; 3; 8	VAL; 1; 12	VAL; 2; 12	VAL; 3; 14	HOC; 1; 10	HOC; 2; 12	HOC; 3; 4				7th	151.5
2014	Jagonya Ayam with Carlin	Volkswagen	**SIL**; **1**; 1	SIL; 2; 4	SIL; 3; 6	HOC; 1; 4	HOC; 2; 5	HOC; 3 Ret	PAU; 1; 11	PAU; 2; 1	PAU; 3; 3	HUN; 1; 1	HUN; 2; 5	HUN; 3; 6	SPA; 1; 4	SPA; 2; 8	SPA; 3; 6	NOR; 1; 10	NOR; 2 Ret	NOR; 3 Ret	MSC; 1; 4	MSC; 2; 3	MSC; 3; 7	RBR; 1; 1	RBR; 2; 2	RBR; 3; 2	NÜR; 1; 5	**NÜR**; **2**; 2	**NÜR**; **3**; 2	IMO; 1; 3	**IMO**; **2**; 1	IMO; 3; 5	HOC; 1; 3	**HOC**; **2**; 1	**HOC**; **3**; 3	2nd	420

=== Complete Deutsche Tourenwagen Masters results ===
(key) (Races in bold indicate pole position) (Races in italics indicate fastest lap)

Year	Team	Car	1	2	3	4	5	6	7	8	9	10	11	12	13	14	15	16	17	18	Pos.	Points
2015	BMW Team RBM	BMW M4 DTM	HOC; 1 Ret	HOC; 2; 17	LAU; 1; 22	LAU; 2 Ret	NOR; 1 Ret	NOR; 2 DSQ	ZAN; 1; 7	ZAN; 2; 18	SPL; 1; 17	SPL; 2 Ret	MSC; 1; 8	MSC; 2; 12	OSC; 1; 7	OSC; 2; 1	NÜR; 1 Ret	NÜR; 2; 4	HOC; 1; 7	HOC; 2; 17	14th	59
2016	BMW Team RBM	BMW M4 DTM	HOC; 1; 13	HOC; 2; 6	SPL; 1; 2	SPL; 2; 6	LAU; 1; 22	LAU; 2; 11	NOR; 1; 15	**NOR**; **2**; 2	ZAN; 1; 16	ZAN; 2; 10	MSC; 1; 22	MSC; 2; 2	NÜR; 1; 2	NÜR; 2; 8	HUN; 1; 22	HUN; 2; 4	HOC; 1; 9	HOC; 2; 7	6th	113
2017	BMW Team RBM	BMW M4 DTM	HOC; 1; 16	HOC; 2; 12	LAU; 1; 17	LAU; 2; 17	HUN; 1; 15†	HUN; 2; 13	NOR; 1; 6	**NOR**; **2**; 9	MSC; 1 Ret	MSC; 2; 7	ZAN; 1 Ret	ZAN; 2; 13	NÜR; 1; 16	NÜR; 2; 10	SPL; 1; 16	SPL; 2; 13	HOC; 1; 15	**HOC**; **2** Ret	17th	25

^{†} Driver retired, but was classified as they completed 75% of the winner's race distance.

=== Complete FIA World Endurance Championship results ===
Year	Entrant	Class	Chassis	Engine	1	2	3	4	5	6	7	8	9	Rank	Points
2016	Extreme Speed Motorsports	LMP2	Ligier JS P2	Nissan VK45DE 4.5 L V8	SIL	SPA	LMS	NÜR	MEX	COA	FUJ	SHA; 2	BHR	24th	18
2018–19	BMW Team MTEK	LMGTE Pro	BMW M8 GTE	BMW S63 4.0 L Turbo V8	SPA; 5	LMS	SIL	FUJ; 2	SHA; 10	SEB	SPA	LMS		17th	29
2021	Jota Sport	LMP2	Oreca 07	Gibson GK428 4.2 L V8	SPA; 3	**ALG**; 2	MNZ; 5	LMS; 2	**BHR**; 2	BHR; 3				2nd	131
2023	United Autosports	LMP2	Oreca 07	Gibson GK428 4.2 L V8	**SEB**; Ret	ALG	**SPA**; 2	LMS; 6	MNZ	FUJ	**BHR**; 8			12th	43

=== Complete Blancpain GT Series Sprint Cup results ===
Year	Team	Car	Class	1	2	3	4	5	6	7	8	9	10	Pos.	Points
2017	Rowe Racing	BMW M6 GT3	Pro	MIS; QR; 16	MIS; CR; 6	BRH; QR	BRH; CR	ZOL; QR	ZOL; CR	HUN; QR	HUN; CR	NÜR; QR	NÜR; CR	19th	8

=== Complete Formula E results ===
(key) (Races in bold indicate pole position; races in italics indicate fastest lap)

Year	Team	Chassis	Powertrain	1	2	3	4	5	6	7	8	9	10	11	12	13	14	15	Pos	Points
2017–18	MS&AD Andretti Formula E	Spark SRT01-e	Andretti ATEC-03	HKG	HKG	MRK; 8	SCL; 11	MEX; 15	PDE; 16	RME; 15	PAR; Ret	BER	ZUR	NYC	NYC				20th	4
2019–20	Panasonic Jaguar Racing	Spark SRT05e	Jaguar I-Type 4	DIR	DIR	SCL	MEX	MRK	BER	BER	BER	BER	BER; 12	BER; 17					26th	0
2020–21	NIO 333 FE Team	Spark SRT05e	NIO 333 001	DIR; 18	DIR; 18	RME; 10	RME; 8	VLC; NC	VLC; 17	MCO; 14	PUE; 13	PUE; Ret	NYC; 16	NYC; 21	LDN; NC	LDN; 19	BER; NC	BER; 10	24th	6

=== Complete IMSA SportsCar Championship results ===
(key) (Races in bold indicate pole position; races in italics indicate fastest lap)

Year	Entrant	Class	Make	Engine	1	2	3	4	5	6	7	8	9	10	11	Rank	Points	Ref
2018	BMW Team RLL	GTLM	BMW M8 GTE	BMW S63 4.0 L Twin-turbo V8	DAY	SEB	LBH	MOH	WGL; 8	MOS	LIM	ELK	VIR	LGA	PET	23rd	23	
2019	BMW Team RLL	GTLM	BMW M8 GTE	BMW S63 4.0 L Twin-turbo V8	DAY	SEB; 7	LBH; 7	MOH; 4	WGL; 7	MOS; 4	LIM; 7	ELK; 5	VIR; 7	LGA; 5	PET; 3	9th	258	
2022	Meyer Shank Racing with Curb-Agajanian	DPi	Acura ARX-05	Acura AR35TT 3.5 L Turbo V6	DAY; 1	SEB; 5	LBH; 4	LGA; 2	MOH; 2	DET; 2	**WGL**; 2	**MOS**; 2	ELK; 4	**PET**; 1		1st	3432	
2023	Meyer Shank Racing with Curb-Agajanian	GTP	Acura ARX-06	Acura AR24e 2.4 L Turbo V6	**DAY**; 1	SEB; 6	LBH; 6	LGA; 6	WGL; 3	**MOS**; 1	ELK; 2	IMS; 6	PET; 1			3rd	2711	
2024	Whelen Engineering Racing	GTP	Cadillac V-Series.R	Cadillac LMC55R 5. 5 L V8	**DAY**; 2	**SEB**; 10	LBH	LGA	DET	WGL; 8	ELK	IMS; 9	**PET**; 5			12th	1403	
2025	Acura Meyer Shank Racing w/Curb-Agajanian	GTP	Acura ARX-06	Acura AR24e 2.4 L Turbo V6	DAY; 2	SEB; 10	LBH; 9	LGA; 11	DET; 6	WGL; 1		ELK; 7	IMS; 3	**PET**; 5		7th	2602	
2025	United Autosports USA	LMP2	Oreca 07	Gibson GK428 V8							MOS; 2					42nd	352	
2026	Acura Meyer Shank Racing w/Curb-Agajanian	GTP	Acura ARX-06	Acura AR24e 2.4 L Turbo V6	DAY; 9	SEB; 4	LBH; 7	LGA; 4	DET; 7	WGL; 10	ELK; 9	**IMS**; 5	**PET**; 6			10th	2465	

=== Complete 24 Hours of Le Mans results ===
Year	Team	Co-Drivers	Car	Class	Laps	Pos.	Class Pos.
2020	(Chinese Taipei) HubAuto Racing	(Chinese Taipei) Morris Chen (Brazil) Marcos Gomes	Ferrari 488 GTE Evo	GTE; Am	273	DNF	DNF
2021	(United Kingdom) Jota Sport	(Indonesia) Sean Gelael (Belgium) Stoffel Vandoorne	Oreca 07-Gibson	LMP2	363	7th	**2nd**
2023	(United Kingdom) United Autosports	(United Kingdom) Oliver Jarvis (United States) Josh Pierson	Oreca 07-Gibson	LMP2	323	18th	8th
2025	(Lithuania) CLX – Pure Rxcing	(Saint Kitts and Nevis) Alex Malykhin (France) Tristan Vautier	Oreca 07-Gibson	LMP2	358	32nd	14th

=== Complete 24 Hours of Daytona results ===
Year	Team	Co-Drivers	Car	Class	Laps	Pos.	Class Pos.
2022	(United States) Meyer Shank Racing with Curb-Agajanian	(United Kingdom) Oliver Jarvis (Brazil) Hélio Castroneves (France) Simon Pagenaud	Acura ARX-05	DPi	761	**1st**	**1st**
2023	(United States) Meyer Shank Racing with Curb-Agajanian	(United States) Colin Braun (Brazil) Hélio Castroneves (France) Simon Pagenaud	Acura ARX-06	GTP	783	**1st**	**1st**
2024	(United States) Whelen Engineering Racing	(Brazil) Pipo Derani (United Kingdom) Jack Aitken	Cadillac V-Series.R	GTP	791	**2nd**	**2nd**
2025	(United States) Acura Meyer Shank Racing with Curb-Agajanian	(United States) Colin Braun (New Zealand) Scott Dixon (Sweden) Felix Rosenqvist	Acura ARX-06	GTP	781	**2nd**	**2nd**

=== American open–wheel racing ===
(key) (Races in bold indicate pole position; races in italics indicate fastest lap)

==== IndyCar Series ====
Year	Team	No.	Chassis	Engine	1	2	3	4	5	6	7	8	9	10	11	12	13	14	15	16	17	18	Rank	Points	Ref
2023	Meyer Shank Racing	60	Dallara DW12	Honda	STP	TXS	LBH	ALA	IMS	INDY	DET	ROA	MOH	TOR; 25	IOW	IOW	NSH	IMS	GTW	POR; 24	LAG; 26		34th	16	
2024	Meyer Shank Racing	66	Dallara DW12	Honda	STP; 15	THE; DNQ	LBH; 22	ALA; 19	IMS; 23	INDY; 31	DET	ROA	LAG	MOH	IOW	IOW	TOR	GTW	POR	MIL	MIL	NSH	30th	46	

==== Indianapolis 500 ====
Year	Chassis	Engine	Start	Finish	Team
2024	Dallara	Honda	25	31	Meyer Shank Racing

=== Complete European Le Mans Series results ===
(key) (Races in bold indicate pole position; races in italics indicate fastest lap)

Year	Entrant	Class	Chassis	Engine	1	2	3	4	5	6	Rank	Points
2025	CLX – Pure Rxcing	LMP2	Oreca 07	Gibson GK428 4.2 L V8	CAT; 4	LEC; Ret	IMO; 10	SPA; 9	SIL; Ret	ALG	13th	15

== Notes ==
Sporting positions
Preceded by Dean Smith	Formula Renault UK; Champion; 2010	Succeeded by Alex Lynn
Preceded by Felipe Nasr; Pipo Derani	IMSA SportsCar Championship; Champion; 2022; With: Oliver Jarvis	Succeeded by Pipo Derani; Alexander Sims
Preceded by Filipe Albuquerque; Ricky Taylor; Alexander Rossi	Michelin Endurance Cup; Champion; 2022; With: Oliver Jarvis	Succeeded by Pipo Derani; Alexander Sims; Jack Aitken
